= Jakub Józef Orliński =

Polish operatic countertenor (born 1990)

- Orliński in 2026
- Born: 8 December 1990 (age 35); Warsaw, Poland
- Education: Chopin University of Music (MM); Juilliard School (GrDip)
- Occupation: Countertenor
- Years active: 2012–present
- Awards: Gramophone Classical Music Award (2019); International Opera Award (2021); International Classical Music Award (2022)
- Website: Official website

Jakub Józef Orliński (Polish pronunciation: [ˈjakup ˈjuzɛf ɔrˈlij̃skʲi]; born 8 December 1990) is a Polish countertenor and breakdancer. He has performed leading roles with many opera companies, including Metropolitan Opera, Royal Opera House, Warsaw Grand Theatre and Oper Frankfurt.

He is the recipient of numerous international awards including the Gramophone Classical Music Award (2019), International Opera Award (2021) and International Classical Music Award (2022).

== Life and career ==
=== Early life and education ===
Orliński was born in Warsaw to parents Jakub Orliński and Bogna Czechowska; both are graphic painters. He has a brother, Franciszek, who is a graphics artist, and two of his grandparents are architects. After singing in a choir as a child, a teenage Orliński joined a nine-member male vocal group and was chosen to sing countertenor parts in some Renaissance music. He also became a fan of The King's Singers, who inspired him to take his interest in the genre further.

He began his music career in the male choir Gregorianum led by Berenika Jozajtis, with which he performed both in Poland and abroad. He is a graduate of the Fryderyk Chopin University of Music. During his studies he participated in a number of performances organized by the Fryderyk Chopin University of Music and the Aleksander Zelwerowicz National Academy of Dramatic Art.

=== Professional musical career ===
Since 2012, Orliński has been a member of the Opera Academy of the Grand Theatre in Warsaw, and from 2015 to 2017 he studied at the Juilliard School with Edith Wiens. In Poland, he performed the roles of Cupid in Venus and Adonis by Blow and Narciso in Agrippina by Handel. During his stay in Germany, he performed the role of Ruggiero in Handel's Alcina in Aachen and Cottbus, and performed selected songs by Purcell at the Leipzig Opera.

He has performed in Carnegie Hall as well as Alice Tully Hall at the Lincoln Center for the Performing Arts in New York and met with positive critical reviews from The New York Times. His performances included Handel's Messiah in cooperation with Musica Sacra and Oratorio Society of New York. He also performed in Jonathan Dove's Flight with Juilliard Opera.

In 2017, he sang the role of Ottone in Handel's Agrippina with Carnegie Hall's La Serenissima: Music and Arts From the Venetian Republic. He took part in the Karlsruhe Handel Festival where he sang Vivaldi's Nisi Dominus and excerpts from Handel's Dixit Dominus. In the same year, he made his debut appearance at the Festival d'Aix-en-Provence in Cavalli's opera Erismena. His performance of Vivaldi's Vedrò con mio diletto from the opera Giustino received over 14 million views on YouTube by 2026. Television appearances of Orliński, including the "Concert de Paris" at the Eiffel Tower and "Rebâtir Notre Dame de Paris", both with the Orchestre National de France and Victoires de la musique classique awards concert accompanied by the Opéra National de Lyon, have been broadcast to millions of viewers worldwide.

He made his debut at the Frankfurt Opera in the 2017/18 season as the title character in Handel's Rinaldo. In 2019, having been invited to perform Eustazio for the Glyndebourne Opera's production in Rinaldo, he was asked two weeks into rehearsals to take over the title role.

Orliński's debut solo album, Anima Sacra, was released on the Erato label on 26 October 2018, with music by orchestra Il Pomo d'Oro conducted by Maxim Emelyanychev. It consists of Baroque arias by various composers from the Neapolitan School, including what is thought to be world premiere recordings of eight works.

In 2019, he won the O!Lśnienie cultural award presented by Onet and the city of Kraków in the category of classical music and jazz. In October, he won the Gramophone Classical Music Award in the category of Young Artist of the Year. In 2020, he received the Paszport Polityki Award presented by the Polityka yearly in the category of classical music.

A second album Facce d'amore, consisting of "a wide-ranging and well-chosen collection devoted to the many faces of love" from operas by Cavalli, Boretti, Bononcini, Scarlatti, Handel, Predieri, Matteis and Conti, prompted reviewer Brian Robins to commend the singer's "talents as a dramatic singer" and his stylish ornamentation, summing up his voice as "sweet-toned".

In September 2020, he received the Best Singer of the Year title in Berlin awarded by the readers of the Opernwelt magazine. He made his debut at the Metropolitan Opera, NYC, in December 2021 after having been chosen to play the role of Orpheus’s alter-ego in Matthew Aucoin’s opera Eurydice.

In 2021, he received a Grammy Award nomination in the Best Opera Recording category for his performance in Handel: Agrippina conducted by Maxim Emelyanychev (Il Pomo d'Oro). That year he also performed early music by Italian composers with Il Pomo d’Oro ensemble, conducted by Zefira Valova, at the Théâtre du Capitole in the southwestern French city of Toulouse.

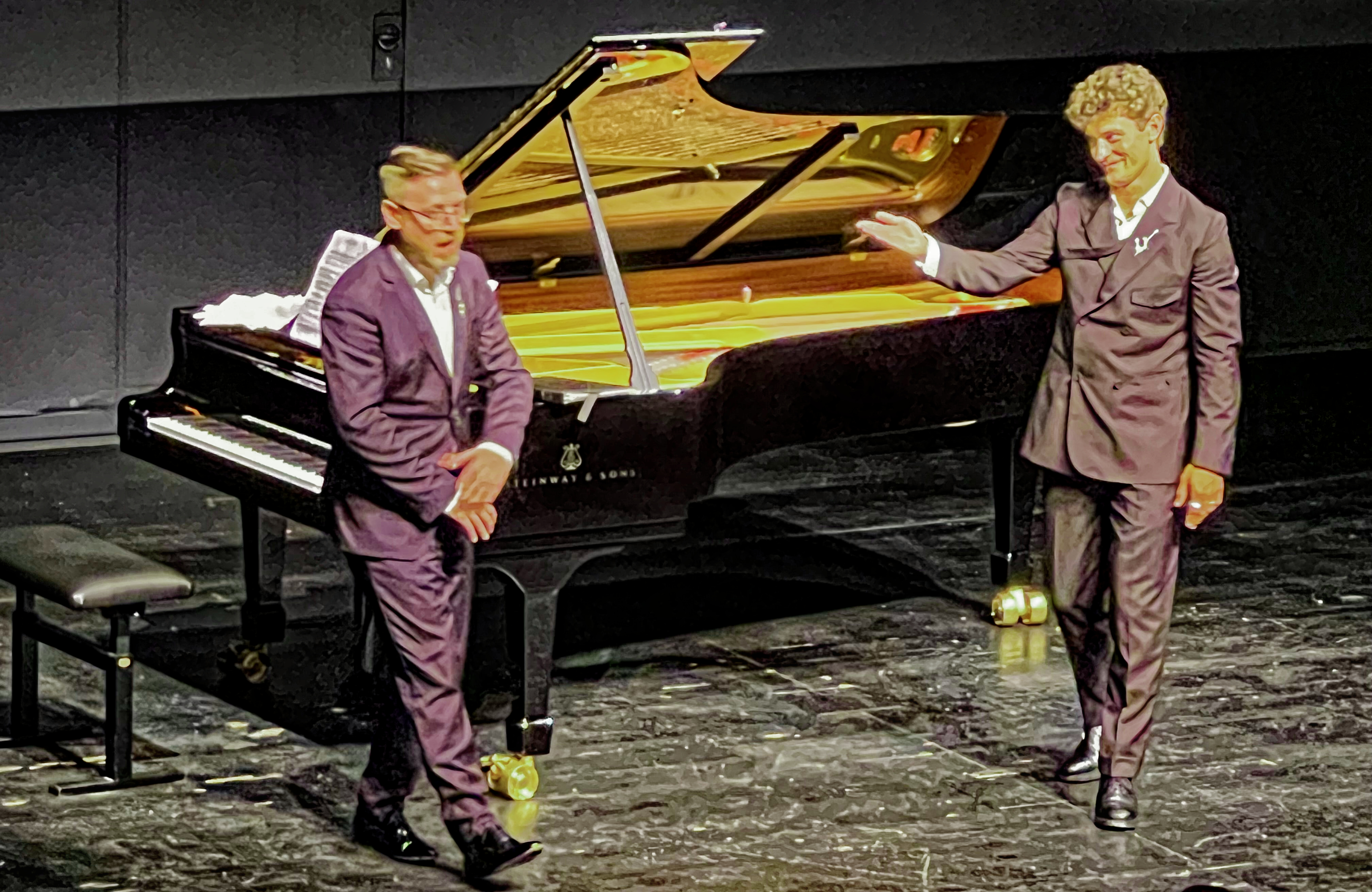
Orliński (right) performing in Munich, 2024

In January 2022, he debuted at London's Royal Opera House in the role of Didymus in Katie Mitchell's production of George Frideric Handel's oratorio Theodora. He added another Handel opera to his repertoire in 2023 when he appeared as Athamas and as Cupid in Semele in Munich.

Having taken the role of Gluck's Orfeo into his repertoire, he has sung in the opera in several venues; for the production by Matthew Ozawa at San Francisco Opera in November 2022, Orliński opened the opera dancing a break routine. One reviewer commented that he was "cast to perfection", and with soprano Meigul Zhang "sang and acted wonderfully, with piquant, youthful urgency". A complete recording of the original Vienna version of Orfeo ed Euridice conducted by Stefan Plewniak was released in 2024, where one reviewer noted the "touching simplicity [Orliński] brings to the role". March 2025 saw Orliński "smooth and rounded of tone and rising to every technical demand" as Ottone in Handel's Aggrippina at the Zurich Opernhaus.

In 2022, he received his second Grammy Award nomination in the Best Opera Recording category for his performance in Matthew Aucoin's Eurydice produced by the Metropolitan Opera Orchestra and conducted by Yannick Nézet-Séguin.

In 2023, he made a guest appearance in Kasia Nosowska's single Zimny (Cold) on her eighth studio album entitled Degrengolada.

On 26 July 2024, he performed at the Summer Olympics opening ceremony in Paris with an estimated global audience of a billion people. He sang Viens Hymen from Jean-Philippe Rameau's opera Les Indes galantes becoming the first artist from Poland to perform at an Olympic Games opening ceremony. In November 2024, he received the Coryphaeus Prize in the Personality of the Year category at the ceremony, which took place at the National Philharmonic Hall in Warsaw.

== Other ventures ==
Orliński is a champion break-dancer and is a member of the breakdancing collective Skill Fanatikz Crew. He is known to occasionally combine breakdancing with opera. He has also modelled for fashion brands such as Nike and Levi's. He participated in advertising campaigns for such brands as Samsung, BMW and Cropp. In 2019, he took part in a photo shoot at the Royal Baths Park in Warsaw and subsequently appeared on the cover of the first edition of Vogue Poland Man magazine. In 2022, he was the subject of an Arte documentary film Jakub Józef Orliński. Music for a While directed by Martin Mirabel.

== Awards ==
- 1st Prize at the Marcella Kochańska Sembrich Vocal Competition, New York, United States (2015)
- 2nd Prize at the IX International Stanisław Moniuszko Vocal Competition, Warsaw, Poland (2016)
- 1st Place Winner at the Lyndon Woodside Oratorio-Solo Competition, New York, United States (2016)
- Winner of the Grand Finals in the Metropolitan Opera National Council Auditions, New York, United States (2016)
- Opus Klassik Award in the Solo Vocal Recital (Opera) category for his performance in Anima Sacra, Germany (2019)
- Gramophone Classical Music Award, London, Great Britain (2019)
- Paszport Polityki in the Classical Music category, Poland (2020)
- International Opera Award for Best Recording (Solo Recital), London, Great Britain (2021)
- International Classical Music Award for his album Anima Aeterna, France (2022)
- Opus Klassik Award in the Audiovisual Music Production category for his performance in Vivaldi: Stabat Mater along with Jan Tomasz Adamus and Capella Cracoviensis, Germany (2022)
- Opus Klassik Award in the Male Singer of the Year category for his performance in Farewells, Germany (2023)
- BBC Music Magazine Award (Vocal Award) for his performance in Beyond, Great Britain (2024)
- Fryderyk Award in the Best Early and Baroque Music Album category for Beyond, Poland (2024)
- Coryphaeus Prize in the Personality of the Year Category, (Poland, 2024)
- Gloria Artis Gold Medal for Merit to Culture (2024, Poland)

== Discography ==
=== Albums ===
List of studio albums, with selected chart positions, sales, and certifications
Title	Album details	Peak chart positions										
Title	Album details	POL	BEL (WA)	BEL (WA) Class.	BEL (FL)	BEL (FL) Class.	SWI	FRA	FRA Class.	UK Class.	US Class.	US Trad. Class.
Anima Sacra	Released: 28 October 2018; Label: Erato/Warner Classics; Format: CD, LP, digital download, streaming	—	110	2	96	1	—	160	3	8	—	3
Facce d’amore	Released: 8 November 2019; Label: Erato/Warner Classics; Format: CD, LP, digital download, streaming	—	65	1	196	2	55	46	1	10	5	3
Anima æterna	Released: 8 October 2021; Label: Erato/Warner Classics; Format: LP, digital download, streaming	32	199	2	112	1	88	—	2	10	—	4
Vivaldi: Stabat mater	Released: 18 March 2022; Label: Erato/Warner Classics; Format: LP, digital download, streaming	34	119	1	—	8	96	—	1	19	—	—
Farewells	Released: 6 May 2022; Label: Erato/Warner Classics; Format: LP, digital download, streaming	39	—	—	—	—	—	—	9	40	—	—
Beyond	Released: 6 October 2023; Label: Erato/Warner Classics; Format: LP, digital download, streaming	42	199	1	—	3	—	—	5	13	—	—
#LetsBaRock	Released: 27 September 2024; Label: Erato/Warner Classics; Format: LP, digital download, streaming	19	—	2	—	9	—	—	6	35	—	—
If music... (with Michał Biel)	Released: 27 March 2026; Label: Erato/Warner Classics; Format: LP, CD, digital download, streaming	—	—	6	—	8	—	— (Note: If Music... did not enter the French Top Albums chart, but peaked at number 165 on the French Physical Albums chart.)	13	26	—	—

=== Video ===
- Eurydice, opera in 3 acts with music by Matthew Aucoin and an English-language libretto by Sarah Ruhl (Erin Morley as Eurydice, Joshua Hopkins as Orpheus, Jakub Józef Orliński as Orpheus's double, Barry Banks as Hades, Nathan Berg as Eurydice's father, conducted by Yannick Nézet-Séguin), streaming HD video of a live performance at the Metropolitan Opera on 4 December 2021

== See also ==
- Music of Poland
- Polish opera
- List of Poles
- Piotr Beczała
- Mariusz Kwiecień
