= Barry Banks (tenor) =

British opera singer

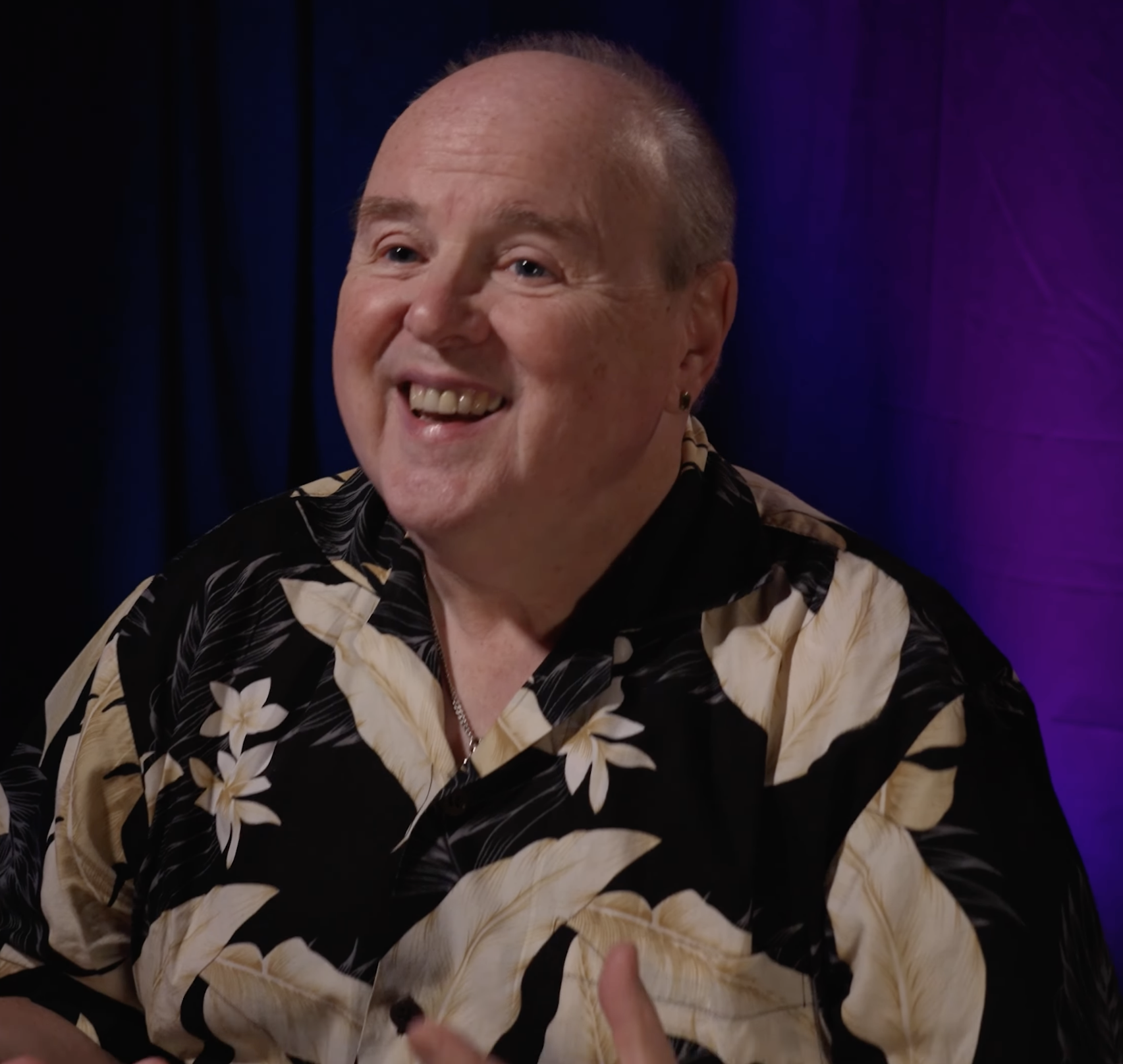
Banks in 2024

Barry Banks (born in Stoke-on-Trent) is a Grammy Nominated English/American lyric tenor who, after a long association with The Metropolitan Opera and English National Opera, has achieved acclaim as one of finest interpreters of the Italian bel canto repertoire.

== Early education ==
As a boy, Banks was the boy soprano soloist in his local family church. When he began high school, he started to play the trumpet. He became a member of the Staffordshire County Music School as a chorister in the Staffordshire County Youth Choir and became the principal cornet player of the Staffordshire County Youth Brass Band. He was a member of multiple brass bands, including The Northern Brass Ensemble and Greenway Moor Brass Band, and consequently learned the early musicianship for which his singing has become known. In 1979, he went on to study voice at the Royal Northern College of Music and in 1985 at the National Opera Studio in London. Whilst studying in Manchester, he was a regular member of the BBC Northern Singers.

== Career ==
His early career saw him honing his craft singing oratorio throughout Britain and Europe and performing with all the major British opera companies including English National Opera, Welsh National Opera, Opera North and Glyndebourne Festival Opera singing light lyric roles such as Almaviva in Il Barbiere di Siviglia, Iopas in Les Troyens, various Mozart roles, The Novice in Billy Budd and Nanki Poo in The Mikado. His first major break was going on to sing Almaviva at ENO whilst covering, and then performing the same role in two tours with WNO. He made his Royal Opera House, Covent Garden debut as Beppe in I Pagliacci. His major European break was whilst covering Tamino in Die Zauberflöte at Glyndebourne. After singing an orchestral stage rehearsal, the then GMD of Leipzig Opera booked him to sing Tamino in Leipzig and he became the first British singer to sing there in the post war era. This was immediately followed by singing the same role in Scottish Opera, La Monnaie in Brussels and the Salzburg Festival. In 1993 Banks made his US debut singing the title role in Bernstein's Candide at the Lyric Opera of Chicago and this was the start of a fruitful association with the major companies of the US that has seen Banks sing the roles of Rossini, Donizetti and Bellini, composers that have become synonymous with this artist, singing roles at The Metropolitan Opera, San Francisco Opera, Lyric Opera of Chicago, LA Opera, Houston Grand Opera, Santa Fe Opera, Opera Colorado in Denver, New York City Opera and orchestras throughout the States. Although primarily known for his bel canto interpretations, Banks has a diverse repertoire, singing the music of Bach, Britten, Handel, Mozart, Berg, Stravinsky (including one of his signature roles, that of Tom Rakewell in The Rake's Progress) Rimsky-Korsakov, Elgar and Gilbert and Sullivan to name but a few. Banks is a regular stage artist throughout Europe singing at houses including ROH, Paris Opera, Gran Teatre del Liceu, Barcelona, Bayerische Staatsoper, Berlin Staatsoper, Frankfurt Opera, Stuttgart Opera, Het Muziektheater, Amsterdam, Théâtre du Châtelet, Paris, La Monnaie, Brussels, Teatro Comunale di Bologna, Teatro alla Scala, Milan, and Teatro San Carlo in Naples.

Most recently, Banks' engagements include the Bayerische Staatsoper as Don Narciso (Il turco in Italia), Count Almaviva (Il barbiere di Siviglia) at The Metropolitan Opera where he was praised by his nuanced and agile singing and Lucia di Lammermoor for ENO. Other roles this season include Carlo in Armida in a new production at The Metropolitan Opera, Don Pasquale for ROH and the Metropolitan Opera, the title role in Mozart's Mitridate at the Bayerischer Staatsoper in Munich. and Semiramide in Napoli. Last season saw his debut at La Scala, Milan with a 10th Anniversary Concert as a memorial to the World Trade Center disaster and a performance of Benjamin Britten's A War Requiem. It also saw his role debut as Hoffmann for a new production of The Tales of Hoffmann for ENO and a new production of Semiramide for The Royal Danish Opera in Copenhagen. This season has included concerts of Britten's A War Requiem in Singapore, and his role debut of Duca di Mantua in Rigoletto, a role that he will be reprising for English National Opera later in the season, and Rossini's Otello in both Paris Théâtre des Champs-Élysées and The Salzburger Festspiele One of his most iconic roles is that of the Astrologer in Rimsky-Korsakov's Coq d'Or, available on DVD.

For the Metropolitan Opera roles include:

- Ernesto – Don Pasquale
- Ramiro – La Cenerentola
- Almaviva – Il Barbiere di Siviglia
- Lindoro – L'italiana in Algeri
- Fisherman – Le Rossignol
- Tonio – La fille du régiment
- Elvino – La Sonnambula
- Nemorino – L'elisir d'amore
- Carlo – Armida
- Gernando – Armida
- Shepherd – Oedipus Rex
- Italian Tenor – Der Rosenkavalier
- Italian Tenor – Capriccio
- Hades - Eurydice
- Flute - A Midsummer Night’s Dream
- Le Comte - Le Comte Ory

Barry Banks lives in New York City

== Discography ==
=== Audio ===
Banks has had a distinguished relationship with Chandos Records and has been a prolific recording artist for the label. CDs for this label include:

- ‘‘Barry Banks sings Bel Canto Arias‘‘ Barry Banks solo recital disc
- The Elixir of Love – Nemorino - Donizetti
- The Magic Flute – Tamino - Mozart
- Don Pasquale – Ernesto - Donizetti
- The Pearl Fishers – Nadir - Bizet
- Don Giovanni – Don Ottavio - Mozart
- The Italian Girl in Algiers – Lindoro - RossinI
- The Thieving Magpie – Giannetto - RossinI
- Paulus – Tenor - Mendelssohn
- Carmina Burana – Roasting Swan - Orff
- Falstaff – Fenton - Verdi

Other recordings include:

- Bianca e Falliero – Contareno – Rossini
- Trial by Jury – Defendant – Gilbert & Sullivan
- I Normanni a Parigi – Odone – Mercadante
- Falstaff – Fenton – Balfe
- La Calisto- Pane/Natura – Cavalli
- Paulus – Tenor Solo – Mendelsshon
- Grande Messe des Morts – Tenor Solo – Berlioz
- Symphony No. 8 - Tenor Solo - Mahler

Other recordings for Sony Classics, EMI, Philips, Telarc and Opera Rara

=== Video ===
- Eurydice, opera in 3 acts with music by Matthew Aucoin and an English-language libretto by Sarah Ruhl (Erin Morley as Eurydice, Joshua Hopkins as Orpheus, Jakub Józef Orliński as Orpheus's double, Barry Banks as Hades, Nathan Berg as Eurydice's father, conducted by Yannick Nézet-Séguin), streaming HD video of a live performance at the Metropolitan Opera on 4 December 2021

== Awards ==
- Peter Moores Scholar
- Grammy Nominee in the 2023 Grammy Awards for Best Opera Recording - The Metropolitan Opera
