= Erin Morley =

American operatic soprano (born 1980)

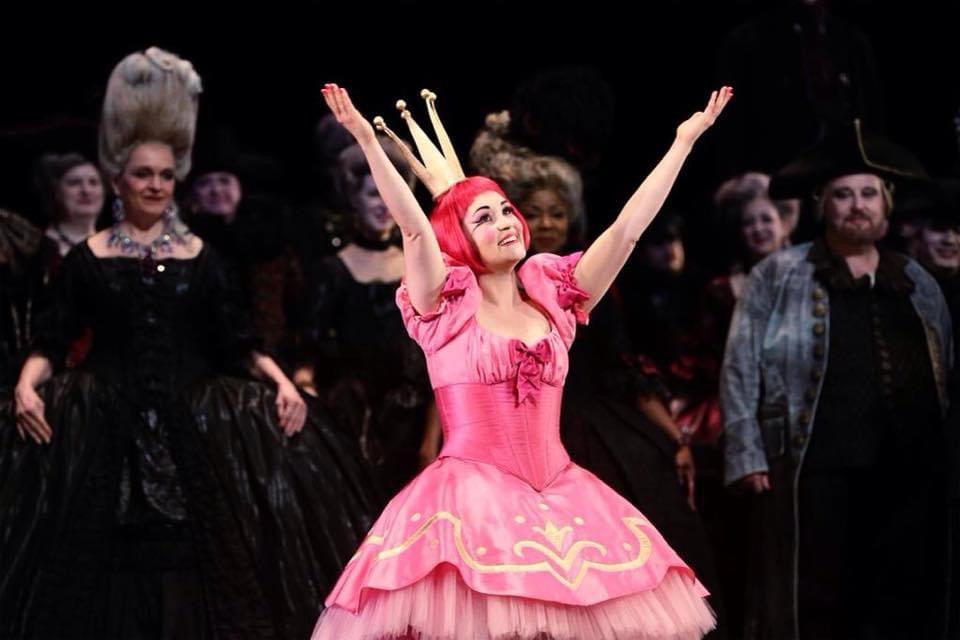
- Erin Morley as Olympia at the Metropolitan Opera, 2015

Background information
- Born: October 11, 1980 (age 46); Salt Lake City, Utah, U.S.
- Genres: Opera, classical
- Occupation: Singer (coloratura soprano)
- Years active: 2007–present
- Website: erinmorley.com

Erin Morley (born October 11, 1980) is an American operatic soprano.

== Early years ==
Morley was born in Salt Lake City, Utah to David Palmer, a former singer in the Tabernacle Choir, and Elizabeth Palmer, a current concertmaster of the Salt Lake Symphony. In grade school she studied piano with Solveig Lunde Madsen (a star pupil of Olga Samaroff), and then with Douglas Humpherys at the Eastman School of Music. Her first professional singing engagements were with the Utah Symphony with Joseph Silverstein and with the Tabernacle Choir on their worldwide broadcast Music & the Spoken Word under the baton of Craig Jessop.

Morley obtained her undergraduate voice degree from Eastman School of Music, her Master of Music voice degree from the Juilliard School, and her Artist Diploma from the Juilliard Opera Center. Morley also trained at the Lindemann Young Artist Development Program, the Opera Theatre of Saint Louis, the Ravinia Festival Steans Institute, and the Wolf Trap Opera Company.

== Career ==
Morley has performed at Carnegie Hall, The Metropolitan Opera, Opéra National de Paris, Royal Opera House, Bavarian State Opera, Vienna State Opera, Teatro alla Scala, Glyndebourne Festival Opera, Gran Teatre del Liceu, LA Opera, and Santa Fe Opera. Morley's debut at the Met was as First Madrigal in Manon Lescaut in 2008. She made her Teatro alla Scala debut in 2022 as Zerbinetta in Ariadne auf Naxos, and her Royal Opera House debut in 2023 as Gilda in Rigoletto. She also debuted at the BBC Proms that same year. She is recognized worldwide for her signature roles of Sophie in Der Rosenkavalier, Gilda in Rigoletto, Zerbinetta in Ariadne auf Naxos, and Olympia in Les Contes d'Hoffmann.

Morley's breakthrough career moment came when she stepped in at the last minute to sing Sophie in Der Rosenkavalier at the Metropolitan Opera during the 2013–2014 season, which was hailed as "a major success". She has since sung more than 100 performances at the Met and has been featured in seven "Live in HD" broadcasts. She has been described by The New York Times as a "limpid, fluid soprano", "silken clarity", and "needlepoint precision". In September 2018 she made her debut, while being 34 weeks pregnant, in Debussy's Le Martyre de saint Sébastien with the Deutsches Symphonie-Orchester Berlin.

Career highlights include Morgana in Handel's Alcina and Zerbinetta in Ariadne auf Naxos both at Teatro alla Scala, the title role in Matthew Aucoin's Eurydice and Sophie in Der Rosenkavalier both with The Metropolitan Opera, and Gilda in Rigoletto with Wiener Staatsoper and Bayerische Staatsoper. She performed as Queen Marguerite in Les Huguenots at Bard College (2009), Cunegonde in Candide at Los Angeles Opera (2018) and in concert at Carnegie Hall (2018) and with the Philadelphia Orchestra (2019). Her Zerbinetta at Teatro La Fenice (2024) for her debut at the theater was also their first time staging Ariadne auf Naxos.

On operatic and concert stages, Morley has collaborated with celebrated conductors worldwide, including Riccardo Muti, Christian Thielemann, Riccardo Chailly, Gustavo Dudamel, Yannick Nézet-Séguin, Andris Nelsons, Seiji Ozawa, James Levine, and Bernard Haitink. Highlights of her concert performances include Orff's Carmina Burana with the Orchestre de Paris and with the Boston Symphony Orchestra at Tanglewood, Poulenc's Gloria with Houston Symphony Orchestra, Brahms' Ein deutsches Requiem with Orchestra of St. Luke's at Carnegie Hall, Beethoven's Missa Solemnis with the Chicago Symphony Orchestra, and Mozart's Mass in C Minor with the Mostly Mozart Festival at Lincoln Center, among many others.

When the COVID-19 pandemic struck, Morley was set to sing the part of Sophie in Werther for the Met's music director, Yannick Nézet-Séguin.

== Personal life ==
Morley is married to John D. Morley, a Yale law professor, and they have three children. She is a member of the Church of Jesus Christ of Latter-day Saints.

== Awards and honors ==
In 2007, she received the Florence & Paul DeRosa Prize from the Juilliard Opera Center. She won 1st prize in the Jessie Kneisel Lieder Competition in 2002, 1st place in the Licia Albanese-Puccini Foundation Competition in 2006, 3rd place in London's Wigmore Hall International Song Competition in 2009, and received the Richard Tucker Career Grant in 2013. The Met Opera production of Der Rosenkavalier, featuring Morley as Sophie, was nominated for the 2019 Grammy Award for Best Opera Recording. She received the Beverly Sills Award in 2021. In 2022, she shared a Grammy Award for Best Choral Performance for her work as a soloist in Mahler's Symphony No. 8, as performed with the Los Angeles Philharmonic under the direction of Gustavo Dudamel and received a Grammy nomination for Eurydice (Metropolitan Opera) in 2022. In 2023, she was one of the recipients of the Opera News Awards. She was named ‘Chevalière dans l'Ordre des Arts et des Lettres’ by the French Minister of Culture in 2023, and the award was presented to her in Paris on February 5, 2024.

== Recordings ==
Morley's first solo album, Rose in Bloom, was released on April 19, 2024.

A recording of Handel's Alcina (Pentatone) featuring Morley's Morgana was released in February 2024. She also appears in a recording produced by Palazzetto Bru Zane of Meyerbeer's Robert le Diable released in 2021.

Morley stars in the title role of The Metropolitan Opera's premiere of Matthew Aucoin’s Eurydice with libretto by Sarah Ruhl captured in the live recording. Yannick Nézet-Séguin conducts, production by Mary Zimmerman. The cast includes Joshua Hopkins, Jakub Józef Orlinski, Barry Banks, and Nathan Berg. Recorded from a live Met radio broadcast (2021). The album was GRAMMY-nominated for Best Opera Recording 2023.

She is a soloist on the Grammy Award winning Deutsche Grammophon recording of Mahler's Symphony No. 8 in E-flat Major "Symphony of a Thousand" with the Los Angeles Philharmonic conducted by Gustavo Dudamel. Morley sings “a Princess Isabelle of true luxury” in a recording of Meyerbeer’s Robert Le Diable. John Osborn as Robert, with Nicolas Courjal, Amina Edris, and Nico Darminin. Marc Minkowski conducts this live performance recorded by Bru Zane (2021).

Morley stars in live recordings available with the Met Opera on Demand, including Dialogues des Carmélites (2013) and The Magic Flute. (2018)

Additional recording collaborations include Princess Mi in Franz Lehár’s Das Land des Lächelns with Christian Thielemann conducting the Staatskapelle Dresden for the 2019 Silvestergala, the Spanish lullaby A la Nanita Nana for the Christmas album Star of Wonder by Millennial Choirs & Orchestras (2020), and Sophie in Strauss’s Der Rosenkvalier with Sebastian Weigle conducting, production by Robert Carsen alongside Renée Fleming, Elīna Garanča, Günther Groissböck, Markus Brück, & Matthew Polenzani (2017).

Morley can be heard in excerpts from Handel’s Messiah with Tamara Mumford, Ben Bliss, and Tyler Simpson, the Mormon Tabernacle Choir and Orchestra at Temple Square. Starring Laura Osnes and Martin Jarvis (2016), and sings the role of Sylvie in this 2015 release of Gounod’s La Colombe on the Opera Rara label. Sir Mark Elder conducts the Hallé, and Javier Camarena, Laurent Naouri, and Michèle Losier round out the cast.

She sings the title role in Mozart’s La finta giardiniera with Emmanuel Haïm conducting, production by David Lescot. Also starring Enea Scala, Marie-Adeline Henry, Marie-Claude Chappuis, Nikolay Borchev, Maria Savastano, and Carlo Allemano. Opéra de Lille for the Erato label (2014).

== Video ==
- Les Contes d'Hoffmann - Vittorio Grigolo as the title role, Erin Morley as Olympia, Hibla Gerzmava as Antonia, Christine Rice as Giulietta, Thomas Hampson as the Four Villains and Kate Lindsey as Niklausse. Production by Bartlett Sher. Yves Abel conducts. Streaming HD video of a live performance at the Metropolitan Opera on 31 January 2015.
- Der Rosenkavalier - Renée Fleming as the Marschallin, Erin Morley as Sophie, Elīna Garanča as Octavian, Günther Groissböck as Baron Ochs and Markus Brück as Faninal. Production by Robert Carsen. Sebastian Weigle conducts. Streaming HD video of a live performance at the Metropolitan Opera on 13 May 2017.
- Dialogues des Carmélites - Isabel Leonard as Blanche de la Force, Erin Morley as Sister Constance, Adrianne Pieczonka as Madame Lidoine, Karen Cargill as Mother Marie, Karita Mattila as Madame de Croissy and David Portillo as Chevalier de la Force. Production by John Dexter. Yannick Nézet-Séguin conducts. Streaming HD video of a live performance at the Metropolitan Opera on 11 May 2019.
- Eurydice - Erin Morley as Eurydice, Joshua Hopkins as Orpheus, Jakub Józef Orliński as Orpheus's double, Barry Banks as Hades, Nathan Berg as Eurydice's father, conducted by Yannick Nézet-Séguin. Streaming HD video of a live performance at the Metropolitan Opera on 4 December 2021.
- Der Rosenkavalier - Lise Davidsen as the Marschallin, Erin Morley as Sophie, Samantha Hankey as Octavian, Günther Groissböck as Baron Ochs and Brian Mulligan as Faninal. Production by Robert Carsen. Simone Young conducts. Streaming HD video of a live performance at the Metropolitan Opera on 15 April 2023.
- Don Giovanni - Peter Mattei in the title role, Adam Plachetka as Leporello, Federica Lombardi as Donna Anna, Ana María Martínez as Donna Elvira, Ying Fang as Zerlina, and Ben Bliss as Don Ottavio. Production by Ivo van Hov. Nathalie Stutzman conducts. Erin Morley as the host. Streaming HD video of a live performance at the Metropolitan Opera on 20 May 2023.
- Die Zauberflöte - Lawrence Brownlee as Tamino, Erin Morley as Pamina, Thomas Oliemans as Papageno, Stephen Milling as Sarastro and Kathryn Lewek as the Queen of the Night. Production by Simon McBurney. Nathalie Stutzmann conducts. Streaming HD video of a live performance at the Metropolitan Opera on 23 June 2023.
