= Eurydice (Ruhl play) =

Play by Sarah Ruhl

- Nick Hern Books Cover Art
- Original language: English
- Written by: Sarah Ruhl
- Characters: Eurydice; Orpheus; Eurydice’s Father; Loud Stone; Little Stone; Big Stone; Lord of the Underworld
- Subject: Orpheus and Eurydice
- Genre: Dramatic comedy
- Setting: Underworld

Premiere
- Date: August 29, 2003
- Place: Madison Repertory Theatre, Madison, Wisconsin

Eurydice is a 2003 play by Sarah Ruhl which retells the myth of Orpheus from the perspective of Eurydice, his wife. The story focuses on Eurydice's choice to return to Earth with Orpheus or to stay in the underworld with her father (a character created by Ruhl). Ruhl made several changes to the original myth's story-line. The most noticeable of these changes was that in the myth Orpheus succumbs to his desires and looks back at Eurydice, while in Ruhl's version Eurydice calls out to Orpheus (causing him to look back) perhaps in part because of her fear of reentering the world of the living and perhaps as a result of her desire to remain in the land of the dead with her father. Ruhl's script has been explicitly written so as to be a playground for the designer of the sets.

The play was adapted by Ruhl for the libretto of an opera by the same name, with music composed by Matthew Aucoin, and directed by Mary Zimmerman. Eurydice premiered in Los Angeles in February 2020 and at the Metropolitan Opera on November 23, 2021. Its opening at the Met was postponed because of the COVID-19 pandemic.

== Productions ==
The play had its world premiere at Madison Repertory Theatre, Madison, Wisconsin, in September 2003. The play next was produced at Berkeley Repertory Theatre, California, in October to November 14, 2004. Directed by Les Waters, Associate Artistic Director, the cast featured Maria Dizzia as Eurydice and Daniel Talbott as Orpheus. It next was presented at Yale Repertory Theatre, New Haven, Connecticut, in September 2006 to October 14, again directed by Les Waters, with Maria Dizzia (Eurydice) and Joseph Parks (Orpheus).

The play opened Off-Broadway at Second Stage Theater, running from June 18 to August 26, 2007. Directed once more by Les Waters, the cast featured Maria Dizzia as Eurydice, Joseph Parks as Orpheus, and Charles Shaw Robinson as Eurydice's Father. The play received several award nominations, including the 2008 Drama League Award, Distinguished Production of a Play, and the 2008 Drama Desk Award, Outstanding Set Design of a Play, (Scott Bradley). Charles Isherwood, reviewing for The New York Times, called it a "weird and wonderful new play." Eighteen years later, a second Off-Broadway production was staged at the Signature Theatre's Romulus Linney Courtyard Theatre, running from May 13 to June 27, 2025. This revived production was again directed by Les Waters and featured Maya Hawke as Eurydice, Brian d'Arcy James as Eurydice's Father, and Caleb Eberhardt as Orpheus.

The play has been produced by hundreds of high schools and universities.

=== US productions ===
It has been staged at: Alliance Theatre in Atlanta, March–April 2008; the Wilma Theater (Philadelphia), May 2008 (with original live music by Toby Twining); ACT Theatre in Seattle, September–October 2008; in October/November 2008 at the Milwaukee Repertory Theater; at the Round House Theatre in Bethesda, Maryland in 2009; in Theatre Ink's 2010–2011 season; by the Custom Made Theatre Co. in San Francisco in 2013; at the Douglas Morrisson Theatre, Hayward, California, in May/June 2013; at American Players Theatre (Spring Green, Wisconsin) under the direction of Tyne Rafaeli in June to October 2016; at elite summer camp Stagedoor Manor, Loch Sheldrake, New York, in July 2019; at the Durham Studio Theater, University of California at Berkeley, March 16–19, 2023.; at the Lang Performing Arts Center, by The Swarthmore College Department of Theater, Swarthmore College, March 31-April 2, 2023; at the Nelda K. Balch Playhouse, Kalamazoo College, February 27-March 2, 2025; at Bainbridge Performing Arts on Bainbridge Island, Washington, March 7–23, 2025 with an original score by Andrew Joslyn; staging at the Nebraska Repertory Theatre between October 2-12, 2025.; at A Public Fit Theatre Company, Las Vegas, Nevada, February 6-March 2, 2026; at Western Illinois University, Macomb, Illinois, April 2-5, 2026.

=== London ===
The play was presented in London at the Young Vic Theatre in May 2010, after a tour starting at the Drum Theatre, Plymouth, on February 25, 2010, and finally playing at the Young Vic's Maria Studio, starting in previews April 29. The play was directed by Bijan Sheibani with a cast that featured Osi Okerafor and Ony Uhiara.

== Plot ==
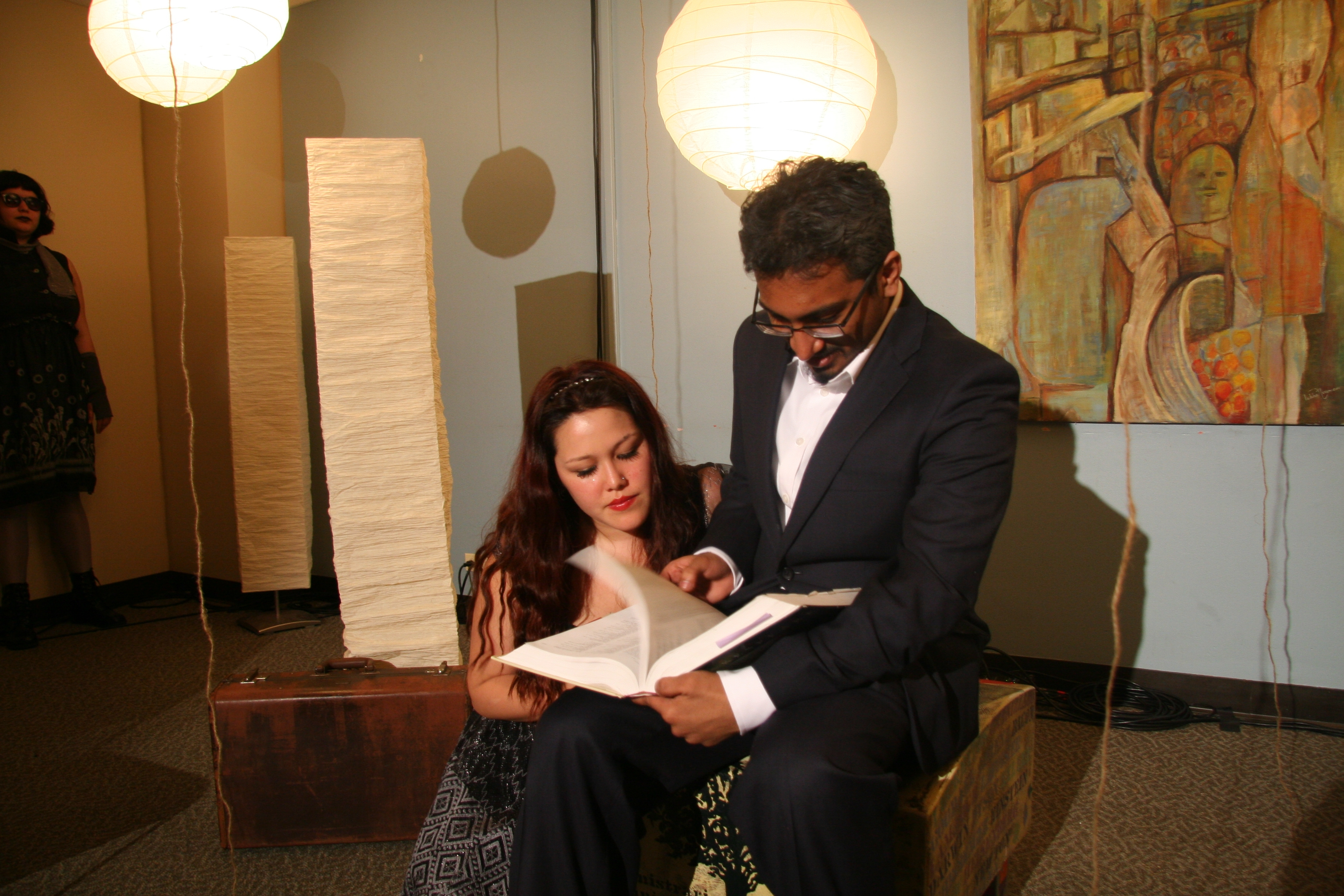
Eurydice's father reads to her from King Lear in a Shimer College production of Eurydice.

The play consists of three movements, divided into numerous scenes: 7 in the first movement, 20 in the second movement, and 3 in the third movement.

The play begins with Eurydice and Orpheus, two young lovers, who are about to get married. In the underworld, Eurydice's dead father has managed to preserve his memory and his ability to read and write, and tries to send her letters. During the wedding, Eurydice goes outside to get a drink of water and she meets a man (the "Nasty Interesting Man") who tells her he has a letter from her father. Eurydice decides to go to his apartment to retrieve the letter, but as she leaves his apartment after resisting the man's attempts to seduce her, she trips and falls to her death on the stairs.

At the beginning of the second movement, there is no set change, but "the movement to the underworld is marked by the entrance of stones": Little Stone, Big Stone, and Loud Stone, who serve as a chorus.

Eurydice enters the underworld through an elevator, inside of which it is raining. Upon arrival, she meets her father, who tries to reteach Eurydice about her past since she has lost her memory after being dipped in the river Lethe. The Stones try unsuccessfully to stop them, because the dead are not allowed to remember their past or speak in human language. Rooms are also not allowed in the underworld, but Eurydice's father creates one for her out of pieces of string. He gradually re-teaches her human language and her past. While the father is away at work, the lord of the underworld enters as a child riding a tricycle and attempts to seduce Eurydice, but fails.

Meanwhile, in the land of the living, Orpheus writes a letter to Eurydice, which her father delivers and reads to her. Orpheus also sends her a copy of the Complete Works of Shakespeare by attaching it to a piece of string, and Eurydice's father reads to her from King Lear. Orpheus sends another letter, and then resolves to go to the underworld himself to find her.

In the third movement, Orpheus arrives at the gates of the underworld, singing a song so powerful it makes the Stones weep. The lord of the underworld tells him that he may take Eurydice back, but only if he does not turn around to look at her. Eurydice is then faced with the decision to either stay with her father or go back with her husband. At her father's insistence, she follows Orpheus. But as she catches up to him, she calls out his name, and he turns to look at her, causing her to die a second death. Meanwhile, her father has decided that he wants to forget everything, and dips himself in the river again. When Eurydice returns, her father is lying silent on the ground, having lost all of his language and memory forever.

As Eurydice mourns her father, the lord of the underworld returns, having grown from a child to superhuman height. He orders her to be his bride. Eurydice pens a letter to Orpheus and his next wife, then immerses herself in the river and lies down in forgetfulness. Finally, Orpheus too enters from the elevator, having truly died this time. He finds Eurydice's letter to him, but because he has been dipped in the river, he cannot read it.

== Opera ==
Ruhl adapted the play into the libretto for an opera, Eurydice by Matthew Aucoin, which premiered at the Los Angeles Opera on February 1, 2020.

== Awards and nominations ==
=== 2007 Off-Broadway premiere ===
Year	Award	Category	Work	Result	Ref.
2008	Drama Desk Award	Outstanding Set Design	Scott Bradley	Nominated	
2008	Drama League Award	Outstanding Production of a Play		Nominated	

=== 2026 Off-Broadway revival ===
Year	Award	Category	Work	Result	Ref.
2026	Outer Critics Circle Award	Outstanding Featured Performer in an Off-Broadway Play	Brian D'Arcy James	Pending	
2026	Lucille Lortel Award	Outstanding Sound Design	Bray Poor	Pending	
