= Eurydice (Aucoin) =

Opera by Matthew Aucoin

- Opera by Matthew Aucoin
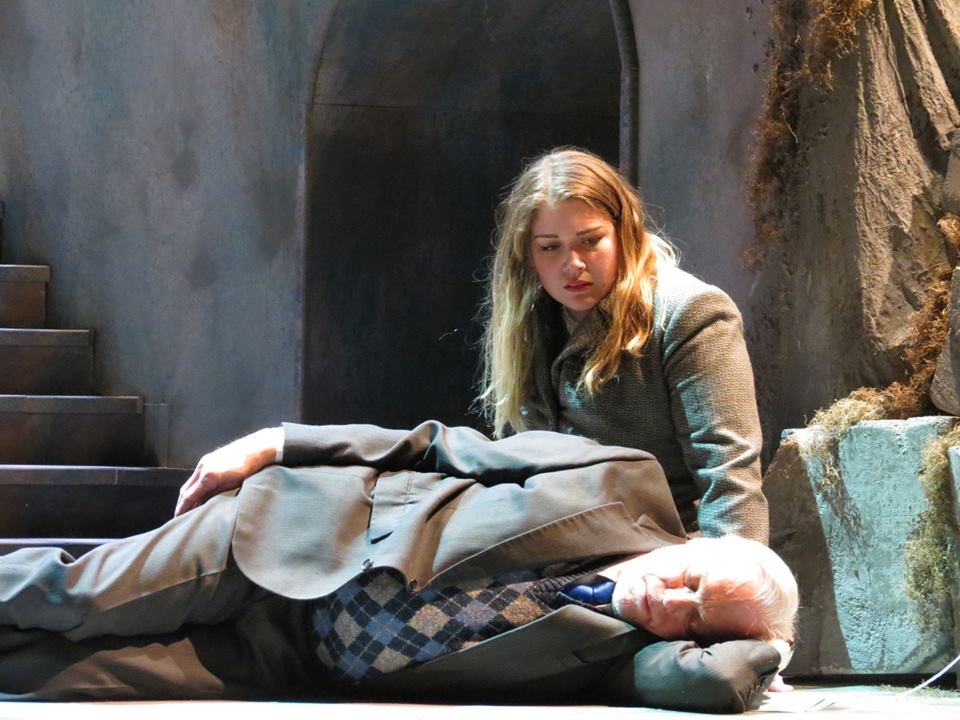
- Eurydice with her father in the underworld (from a 2016 production of Ruhl's play)
- Librettist: Sarah Ruhl
- Language: English
- Based on: Eurydice by Sarah Ruhl
- Premiere: February 1, 2020; Los Angeles Opera

Eurydice is an opera composed by Matthew Aucoin with a libretto by Sarah Ruhl based on her 2003 play of the same name, a retelling of the legend of Orpheus and Eurydice. It had its premiere at the Los Angeles Opera on February 1, 2020, with Aucoin conducting. It had its Metropolitan Opera premiere on November 23, 2021.

== Composition history ==
The work was co-commissioned and co-produced by the Metropolitan Opera, and was mostly written while Aucoin was serving as the Los Angeles Opera's artist in residence. The Los Angeles Times noted that this production, "the world's newest major opera", is on the same subject as the world's oldest surviving opera, Jacopo Peri's Euridice, which premiered 420 years earlier in 1600.

== Roles ==
Role	Voice type	Premiere cast, February 1, 2020 (Conductor: Matthew Aucoin)
Eurydice	soprano	Danielle de Niese
Orpheus	baritone	Joshua Hopkins
Orpheus's Double	countertenor	John Holiday
Eurydice's Father	baritone	Rod Gilfry
Hades	tenor	Barry Banks
Little Stone	soprano	Stacey Tappan
Big Stone	mezzo-soprano	Raehann Bryce-Davis
Loud Stone	tenor	Kevin Ray

== Synopsis ==
This opera retells the legend of Orpheus and Eurydice from Eurydice's point of view. Ruhl explained that "in the myth, we never hear from Eurydice – she is always a cipher. I'm interested in her voice, a voice that hasn't been heard before."

=== Act 1 ===
Orpheus, a musician, and Eurydice are playing on the beach. Orpheus proposes to Eurydice and she accepts. Her deceased father is seen in the underworld, writing a letter to her and wondering how to get it delivered. At her wedding, Eurydice steps outside and expresses a wish to see more interesting people. A mysterious "interesting man" appears and invites her to his apartment. After giving her champagne, he shows her the letter from her father. She tries to grab it but trips and falls down a long flight of stairs to her death in the underworld.

=== Act 2 ===
The three Stones, a kind of Greek chorus, explain that Eurydice has crossed the river of forgetfulness (which is portrayed as a rainshower in the elevator descending to the underworld), and now has no memory and no power of language. Her father greets her, but she does not know who he is. In the land of the living, Orpheus mourns Eurydice's death and writes her a letter, but does not know how to get it to her; he decides he might give it to a worm. It flutters down to the underworld, where her father reads it to her. The name of Orpheus helps her to regain her memory and recognize her father. Orpheus then lowers the collected works of Shakespeare on a string, and her father reads it to her, helping her to relearn language. Orpheus resolves to go to the underworld and bring Eurydice back. He sings outside the gate and rouses Hades, the lord of the underworld, who was the "interesting man" she met just before her death.

=== Act 3 ===
Orpheus tells Hades that he is determined to take Eurydice back to the land of the living. Hades explains that she can follow him, but he must not look back to see if she is there; if he does she will be lost to him forever. Eurydice is fearful and does not want to leave her father, but he insists she must return with her husband. Afraid that she is being tricked and that it not really Orpheus she is following, she calls out his name. He turns around and she is pulled back to the underworld.

Meanwhile, her father, desolate at losing her, dips himself in the river of forgetfulness. Eurydice, returning after her second death, finds that her father now has no memory or power of speech. Hades declares that he will take Eurydice as his bride. She writes a letter to Orpheus, lays it on the ground, and steps into the river of forgetfulness. Orpheus arrives and sees her, but then the shower robs him of his memory. He finds the letter she wrote him, but does not know how to read it.

== Performance history ==
The critical reaction to the opera's Los Angeles premiere was varied. Mark Swed of the Los Angeles Times said the opera is "ambitious, confident, often impressive, mostly engaging, instrumentally colorful and splendidly singable. At its best, it is gratifying grand opera." Anthony Tommasini of The New York Times suggested that Aucoin may have been too deferential to Ruhl's play, so that "the musical language of Eurydice is at times curiously tame." He added that "the opera's boldest stroke" is the creation of a double for Orpheus, so that the main character is portrayed as an "everyday guy" who has a gift for music, with a godlike dimension signified by his double. Jim Farber wrote in the Orange County Register that the production was "a triumph – musically, visually and vocally." Matthew Richard Martinez, writing for Bachtrack, noted that the creators (composer Aucoin, librettist Ruhl, and director Zimmerman) are all recipients of the MacArthur "Genius" grant and said that "Given the brilliance of the piece's music, its moving and unique take on the Orpheus and Eurydice myth, and its deft execution, three 'geniuses' make for one captivating opera."

Eurydice was given its Metropolitan Opera premiere on November 23, 2021. The cast included Erin Morley as Eurydice, Joshua Hopkins as Orpheus, Jakub Józef Orliński as Orpheus's double, Barry Banks as Hades, and Nathan Berg as Eurydice's father; the conductor was the company's music director, Yannick Nézet-Séguin, and the stage director was Mary Zimmerman. The performance was broadcast live by the Metropolitan Opera Radio via the Met's Sirius XM channel. Zachary Woolfe, who reviewed the performance for The New York Times, praised Ruhl's libretto, but felt that Aucoin's music and scoring overwhelmed the story. Still, he thought it was a "a clearer, stronger work" than Aucoin's previous opera, Crossing (2015), and noted that "the dancing at Orpheus and Eurydice's wedding, a hint of pop music glimpsed through ominous shadows, is a little jewel." The Met performed the opera a total of seven times that season. The fourth performance, on December 4, was videocast live as part of the Metropolitan Opera Live in HD series and also broadcast on the Metropolitan Opera Radio network and SiriusXM. An HD video recording of that performance is available for streaming at Met Opera on Demand. The final performance of the opera that season (December 16) was also broadcast on Sirius XM.

== See also ==
List of Orphean operas
