= Harvard College Opera =

Opera group at Harvard University

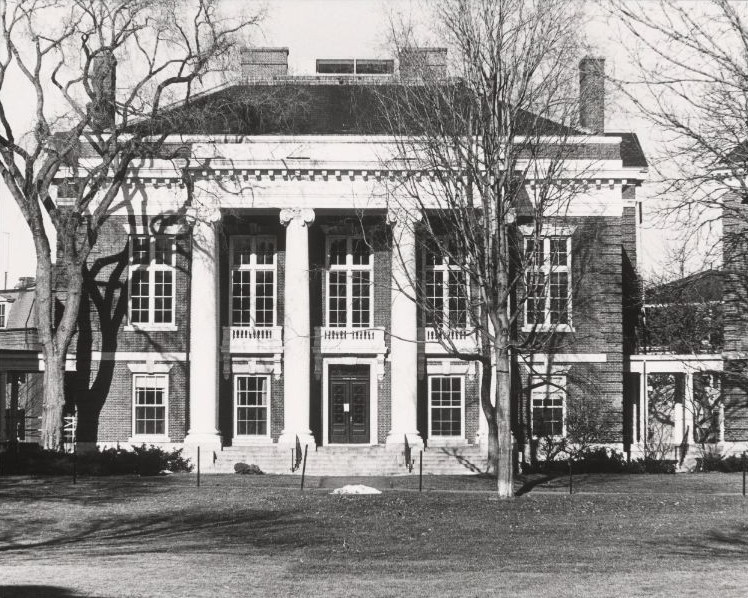
Agassiz House, whose theatre has been the venue for HCO's productions since 2014

Harvard College Opera (HCO), formally the Harvard College Opera Society, is a collegiate opera company composed of undergraduates at Harvard College and based in Cambridge, Massachusetts. Founded in 1992 at Dunster House as the Dunster House Opera Society, the organization aims to expand undergraduate access to opera at Harvard.

HCO presents a variety of performances, including annual staged operas at the Agassiz Theatre and recitals. Prior to the 2014 season, the company performed its annual operas in Dunster House.

== Membership ==
Harvard College Opera is governed by a Board of Operators composed of approximately twenty students. The Board of Operators selects a shortlist of operas for the music and stage directors, also selected by the Board, to decide from for each production. In keeping with the company's mission of providing opportunities to undergraduates, the music and stage directors are always students at Harvard College.

The annual operas produced by HCO involve around 80 undergraduates in the cast, staff, and orchestra. To provide opera performance opportunities to students of a liberal arts institution, the cast is generally entirely composed of Harvard undergraduates, though the company has occasionally featured undergraduates at the Boston Conservatory and New England Conservatory, students at the Harvard graduate schools, and recent graduates of Harvard College.

== Past productions ==
- Cendrillon (2025)
- Falstaff (2024)
- The Merry Widow (2023)
- Le Nozze di Figaro (2022)
- Die Zauberflöte (2020)
- Cendrillon (2019)
- Die Fledermaus (2018)
- Le Nozze di Figaro (2017)
- The Rake's Progress (2016)
- Hansel and Gretel (2015)
- Così fan tutte (2014)
- Cendrillon (2013)
- The Marriage of Figaro (2012)
- Die Fledermaus (2011)
- Albert Herring (2010)
- The Rake's Progress (2009)
- Cosi fan tutte (2008)
- The Marriage of Figaro (2007)
- Dialogues of the Carmelites (2006)
- Candide (2005)
- Cosi fan tutte (2004)
- La Cenerentola (2003)
- The Marriage of Figaro (2002)
- The Bartered Bride (2001)
- The Magic Flute (2000)
- Candide (1999)
- Don Giovanni (1998)
- The Tales of Hoffmann (1997)
- The Marriage of Figaro (1996)
- Gianni Schicchi and La rondine (1995)
- Die Fledermaus (1994)
- Carmen (1993)

== Notable alumni ==
Past members of the company include composers Benjamin P. Wenzelberg, Matthew Aucoin and Joel Derfner, baritone Davóne Tines, mathematician and chessmaster Noam Elkies, and businesswoman Randi Zuckerberg.
