= John D. Morley =

American legal scholar

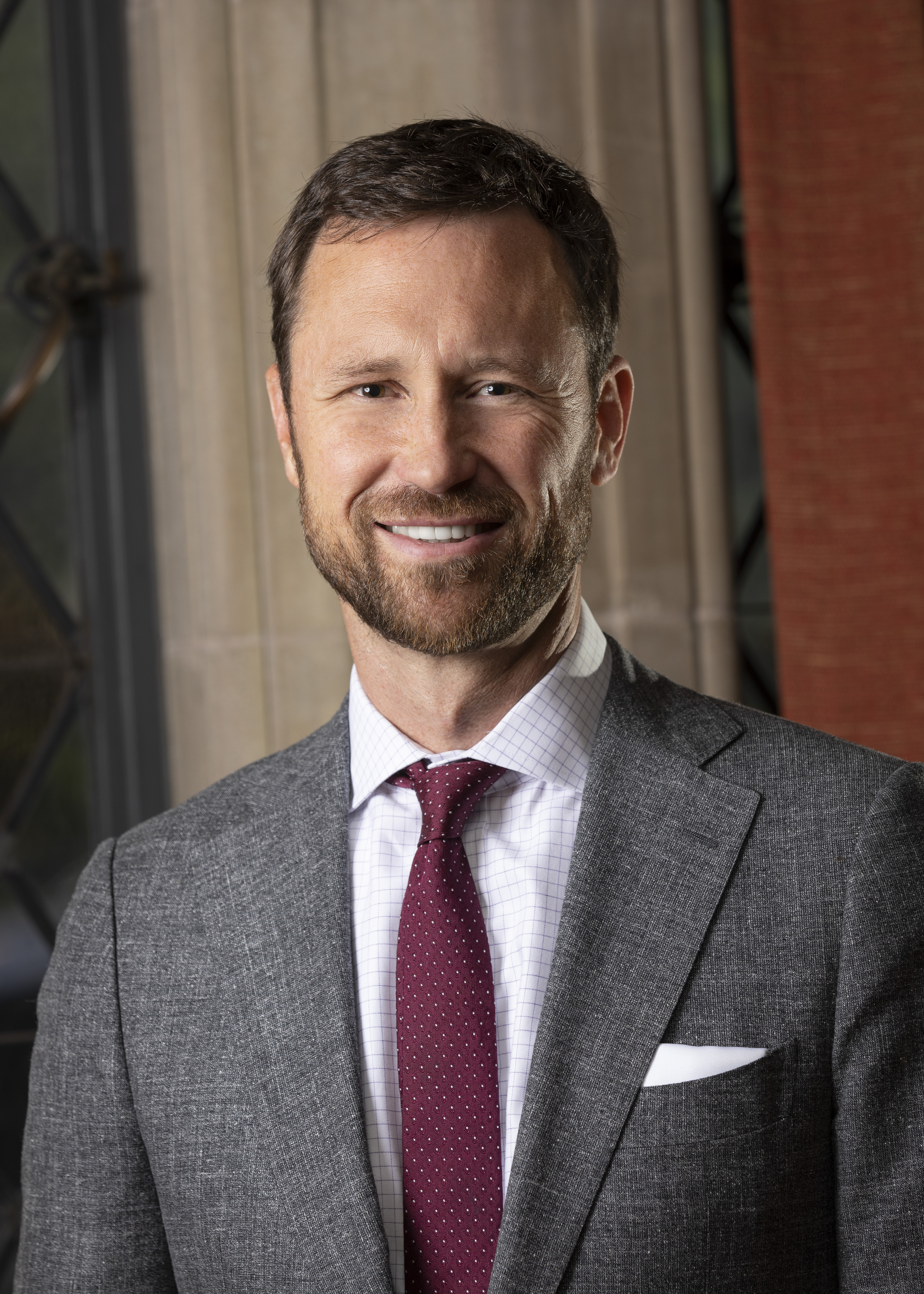

John Dirk Morley (born 1979) is an American legal scholar. He is the Augustus E. Lines Professor of Testamentary Law at Yale Law School, where he also serves as Faculty Director of the Chae Initiative in Private Sector Leadership.

Morley is noted for his research on the law and economics of organization and has written extensively on the structure and regulation of investment funds, trusts, law firms, marriages, estates, and other organizations.

== Life and career ==
Morley studied economics and political science at the University of Utah, graduating in 2003 and attending Yale Law School thereafter. At Yale, he was the essays editor of The Yale Law Journal. He graduated with a J.D in 2006.

After law school, Morley worked as an associate in the corporate and securities practice group at Covington & Burling. He then returned to Yale to be the executive director of the Yale Law School Center for the Study of Corporate Law, a post he held from 2007 to 2010. From 2010 to 2013, Morley was an associate professor at the University of Virginia School of Law. He joined the Yale Law School faculty as an associate professor of law in 2013. He was promoted to a full professorship in 2016 and to the Augustus E. Lines professorship in 2024. He has taught classes on investment funds; securities regulation; organizational theory; business organizations; wills, trusts, and estates; and the business of law firms.

Morley is married to opera singer Erin Morley.

== Scholarship ==
Morley's research broadly engages the law and economics of organization and the law of trusts and estates. He is one of the nation's leading academic experts on the regulation and structure of investment funds. He has also written about a variety of unusual kinds of organizations, including law firms, business trusts, early modern business firms, marriages, donative trusts, and special-purpose acquisition companies. In 2013, he published The Separation of Funds and Managers, an influential paper in the Yale Law Journal, which argues that the defining characteristic of investment fund is not the assets that they hold, but their peculiar patterns of organization. Another of his papers, authored in 2016, demonstrates the historical significance of the common law trust as a competitor of the corporation as a form of business organization. More recently, his work has considered the organizational conditions that make law firms prone to sudden and swift collapse.

== Advocacy and practice ==
Morley is an active legal practitioner, expert witness, legal consultant, and policy advocate. From 2014 to 2017, he served as a reporter for the Uniform Directed Trust Act, drafting a statute on the division of trustee powers that has since been enacted in 16 states.

In 2021, he combined with professor Robert J. Jackson Jr. to file a series of lawsuits against the sponsors of several special purpose acquisition companies (SPACs). Morley and Jackson alleged that certain SPACs were operating as illegal investment companies under the Investment Company Act of 1940. In 2024, the SEC issued regulatory guidance largely agreeing with Morley and Jackson's view and warning SPACs against the regulatory challenges Morley and Jackson identified.

From 2022 to 2024, Morley served as the chair of the Global Corporate Governance Colloquium. In 2024, he became one of the principal architects of the Anthropic Long-Term Benefit Trust, a governance structure at Anthropic.

Morley speaks and writes on Law360 and is a frequent podcast guest.
