= Piano Concerto (Aucoin) =

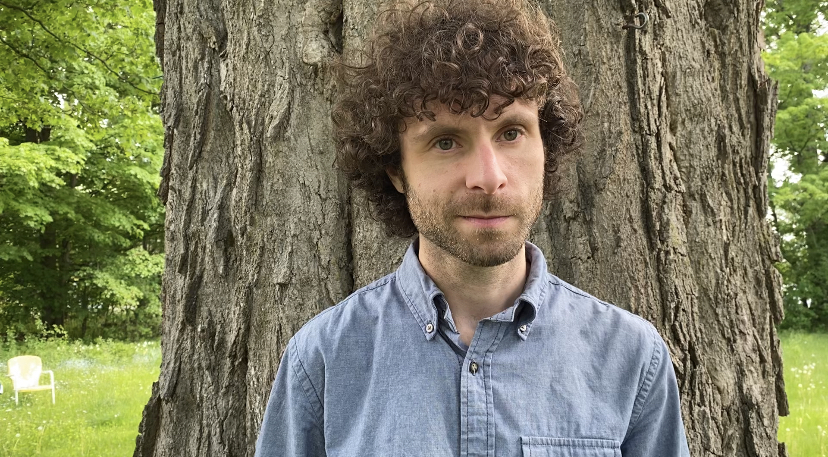
Matthew Aucoin in 2021

The Concerto for Piano and Orchestra is a piano concerto written by the American composer Matthew Aucoin. The work was commissioned by the Gilmore International Keyboard Festival. Its world premiere was performed by the pianist Conor Hanick and the Alabama Symphony Orchestra under the direction of Carlos Izcaray at the Alys Robinson Stephens Performing Arts Center on October 7, 2016.

== Composition ==
The concerto has a duration of approximately 38 minutes in performance and is cast in three numbered movements.

=== Instrumentation ===
The work is scored for solo piano and an orchestra consisting of two flutes (2nd doubling piccolo), two oboes (2nd doubling English horn), two clarinets, bass clarinet, two bassoons, four horns, two trumpets, trombone, bass trombone, tuba, timpani, three percussionists, and strings.

== Reception ==
The piano concerto has been praised by music critics. Reviewing a performance by Hanick and the Boston Modern Orchestra Project conducted by Gil Rose, Zoë Madonna of The Boston Globe wrote, "It began with ominous drumrolls, evoking a procession of the condemned. The solo piano, played with a deft touch and cool sparkle by Conor Hanick, made a mad dash for freedom, spurred on by the orchestra. Octave doublings gave the sound a primeval urgency. The second movement rested on a relaxed pulsing rhythm in the piano; if you breathed along, you'd calm down, until whistling winds and thudding drums signaled a slide from contentment to resurging anxiety, glockenspiel joining the piano in insistent alarm. The perpetual motion of the first movement returned in the brief finale, the soloist fighting a tidal surge in counter motion with the orchestra."
