= The Clean House =

2004 play written by Sarah Ruhl

- Samuel French Cover Art
- Original language: English
- Written by: Sarah Ruhl
- Characters: Matilde; Lane; Virginia; Charles; Ana
- Subject: Loss, love, change and redemption
- Genre: Romantic comedy
- Setting: Connecticut

Premiere
- Date: September 2004
- Place: Yale Repertory Theatre, New Haven, CT

The Clean House is a play by Sarah Ruhl, which premiered in 2004 at Yale Repertory Theatre, was produced Off-Broadway at Lincoln Center Theater in 2006, and has since been produced in many theaters. The play is a whimsical romantic comedy centered on Matilde, a Brazilian cleaning woman who would rather be a comedian. The play was a finalist for the 2005 Pulitzer Prize for Drama.

== Plot summary ==
Three characters address the audience. Matilde comes out first, telling an elaborate joke in Portuguese, without translation. Next Lane, a doctor in her 50s, explains that Matilde, her Brazilian maid, is depressed and has been failing to clean her house and so she had her medicated. She is followed by Virginia, Lane's older sister, a housewife, who argues that people who do not clean their own homes are insane. Matilde finally comes back to tell the audience, this time in English, about how her parents, both wonderful comedians, recently died. Not knowing what to do with herself, Matilde came to America to clean this house.

Lane and Matilde are still trying to work out their situation, especially since Lane feels uncomfortable having to order Matilde around and Matilde does not seem to be cleaning. While Lane is at work, Virginia comes to visit Matilde, having heard about her depression. Matilde explains that she doesn't like to clean and Virginia offers to clean the house for her every day before Lane comes home from the hospital.

Matilde and Virginia discover panties in Lane's laundry that look too sexy for her and begin suspecting her husband Charles, also a doctor, is cheating on her. Their suspicions are confirmed when Lane tells them that Charles has left her for an older woman named Ana, a patient of his who had breast cancer and is now recovering from a mastectomy. Lane deduces that Virginia has been cleaning the house instead of Matilde. Lane fires Matilde. Right before Matilde's departure, she sees Lane's imagined idea of Charles and his lover. She tries to tell Lane a joke, but as it is in Portuguese, Lane can't understand it. She tries to laugh, but just ends up crying. Virginia then enters to tell the two that Charles and Ana are at the door. The act ends with Charles calling to Lane from offstage.

The second act begins with Ana, a free-spirited Argentine, and Charles, who are the same actors who have been playing Matilde's parents during act 1. Charles performs surgery on Ana and then they act out the scene where they meet for the first time and fall in love in a matter of moments. The play then deposits the characters back to where act 1 ended, as Ana and Charles are let into the house awkwardly. Ana and Matilde bond immediately. Charles tells Lane that Ana is his Bashert (soul mate) and that, according to Jewish law (although neither he nor Lane is Jewish), this means that their marriage is dissolved. Lane doesn't know how to react, though she is clearly upset and bitter about the turn of events. Ana, after learning Matilde was just fired by Lane, offers for Matilde to come and clean their house. Lane, taking her aggression out on Ana, argues that she relies on Matilde and couldn't bear to part with her. Matilde, now being fought over by the two women, decides to split her time between both of their houses. Charles, Ana, and Matilde leave to go apple picking.

Matilde and Ana converse in Portuguese and Spanish on Ana's balcony, eating apples and throwing them into the 'sea,' which also happens to be Lane's living room. Meanwhile, back at Lane's house, she and her sister fight, with Lane taking out her frustration over the situation on Virginia's obsessive cleaning.

Ana and Charles fight over her going back to the hospital. Charles wants her to fight her cancer more aggressively, with Ana refusing to subject herself to more hospitals. Matilde watches as the two react to Ana's illness in their separate ways. While standing alone on Ana's balcony, Matilde discovers her 'perfect joke' and realizes that it did not kill her after all.

Soon, Matilde arrives back at Lane's home with news that Ana's cancer has come back and that she refuses to go to a hospital. She tells them that Charles, frantic for his lover's health, has gone to Alaska to cut down a Yew tree, which supposedly has healing powers. Matilde manages to convince Lane to visit Ana in a medical capacity. While at Ana's home, Lane examines Ana with an air of coldness before breaking down and yelling at her for making Charles love her in a way he never loved Lane. The two women share a moment, and Lane manages to forgive Ana.

Lane allows Ana to move in with her while Charles is away. As time passes, Charles sends a telegram, telling Ana that he has found a tree, but cannot get it onto a plane. He asks her to wait as he learns to fly a plane himself. Ana's condition, however, quickly worsens, and unwilling to have cancer beat her, she asks Matilde to kill her with a joke. Matilde reluctantly agrees. The next morning, she tells Ana her perfect joke. As Matilde whispers in Ana's ear, beautiful music plays over the audience and Ana laughs until she dies in Matilde's arms. Matilde sobs, and upon hearing the noise, Lane and Virginia come back into the room. Virginia says a prayer over the body. It is here that Charles returns with his tree. Lane meets him at the door, where she lets him know what happened and forgives him. He hands her the tree as he goes to approach the body.

Matilde ends the play imagining her mother laughing as she gave birth to her. Ana and Charles transform back into her parents and there is a moment of completion between the three of them. Matilde has come full circle with her parents, from death back to birth, finding finality and closure in the moment.

The last line of the play is Matilde's as she tells the audience: "I think heaven is a sea of untranslatable jokes, except everyone is laughing."

== Production history ==
The Clean House had its world premiere at the Yale Repertory Theatre, Connecticut, from September 17 to October 9, 2004, directed by Bill Rauch.

The play has been produced in many regional theaters, such as at South Coast Repertory in its West Coast premiere from January 29, 2005 to February 27; the Goodman Theatre from April to June 2006; the Woolly Mammoth Theatre Company, Washington, D.C. from July 11 to August 14, 2005; the Barksdale Theatre in Richmond,Virginia (2008); and the Portland Stage Company, Portland, Oregon (2009).

The play premiered Off-Broadway at Lincoln Center's Mitzi E. Newhouse Theater on October 29, 2006 in a limited run to January 28, 2007. Directed by Bill Rauch, the cast featured Blair Brown (Lane), Jill Clayburgh (Virginia), John Dossett (Charles/Mathilde's father), Concetta Tomei (Ana/Mathilde's mother), and Vanessa Aspillaga (Mathilde).

The play was produced at the Crucible Theatre, Sheffield, England in April 2006, (European Premiere) and at Northampton's Royal & Derngate theatres in February 2008 and then on a UK tour. The Sheffield production featured Patricia Hodge (Lane) and Eleanor Bron (Ana/Mathilde's mother). It was directed by Samuel West. Both actors revived these roles for Northampton and UK tour, directed by John Dove.

It was produced at California Repertory Company (2015) in Long Beach, California. The director, Joanne Gordon, noted that Ruhl "...presents a female perspective with wit, with humor, with subtlety, and the element which I enjoy so much about her work... it possess that kind of Latin magic - realism."

Other international productions include: The Fairfax Studio in Melbourne, Australia (2006) The Marlowe Theatre in Canterbury (2008); the Espace Libre theatre (Montreal) in French (2008); Circa Theatre, Wellington, New Zealand (2009).

The Theatre Sarnia production won the Western Ontario Drama League (WODL) Festival as Best Production. This allowed them to compete at the provincial level, where they won "Outstanding Festival Production" at the Theatre Ontario Festival (2015).

== Critical response ==
The Clean House has received positive reviews from some critics. David Rooney, the Variety reviewer wrote: "This funny, tender play has screwy poetry and penetrating wisdom, oddball humor, deadpan soap, operatic arias, fantasy, spirituality and a soaring sense of romance. Most of all, it has tremendous compassion [...] It’s her skill at weaving together the jagged edges of conflicting lives— finding common ground between neurotic sisters, rivals for the same man or just people with discordant attitudes to life— that makes Ruhl’s play as rewarding humanistically as it is theatrically."

Charles Isherwood of The New York Times wrote that the play is "[...] a gorgeous production that fully taps its tart humor, theatrical audacity and emotional richness [...] Sociology is just one small thread in the multihued tapestry of “The Clean House,” a play that keeps revealing surprising insights, whimsical images and layers of rich feeling as it goes along."

Peter Marks, reviewing the 2005 Woolly Mammoth Theatre (Washington, DC) production, wrote: "As with most original voices, it takes a while to tune into Ruhl's wavelength. Once connected, though, you commune warmly with her funny and compassionate sense of life's metamorphosing rewards and punishments." Other publications, such as The Village Voice and The New Yorker were more critical, writing about the play's style and its treatment of Matilde. Hilton Als, in The New Yorker, wrote of the "lazy romanticism about the proletariat, for whom she seems to have no real feeling at all." At the end of 2006, Entertainment Weekly magazine named the New York production one of the top ten theatrical attractions of the year.

== Awards and nominations ==
The play was a finalist for the 2005 Pulitzer Prize for Drama.

The Clean House won the 2004 Susan Smith Blackburn Prize, awarded annually to the best English-language play written by a woman.
