= Dead Man's Cell Phone =

Play by Sarah Ruh

- Written by: Sarah Ruhl
- Characters: Jean; Gordon; Mrs. Gottlieb; Hermia; Dwight; The Other Woman; The Stranger
- Original language: English
- Genre: Dramatic comedy

Premiere
- Date premiered: June 4, 2007
- Place premiered: Woolly Mammoth Theatre Company, Washington, D.C.

Dead Man's Cell Phone is a play by Sarah Ruhl. It explores the paradox of modern technology's ability to both unite and isolate people in the digital age. The play was awarded a Helen Hayes Award for Outstanding New Play.

== Productions ==
The play premiered at the Woolly Mammoth Theatre Company, Washington, D.C., on June 4, 2007, running to July 1, 2007, and was directed by Rebecca Bayla Taichman. This world premiere production was nominated for seven Helen Hayes Awards, including a nomination for Polly Noonan who originated the role of Jean. Also featured were Woolly Mammoth ensemble members including Sarah Marshall, Naomi Jacobson, Rick Foucheux, Bruce Nelson, and Jennifer Mendenhall. The set was designed by Neil Patel.

The play premiered Off-Broadway at Playwrights Horizons on March 4, 2008, and closed on March 30, 2008. It starred Mary Louise Parker (as "Jean") and Kathleen Chalfant (as "Mrs. Gottlieb") and was directed by Anne Bogart. Bill Camp was set to star as Gordon, before having to withdraw due to other work commitments, before being replaced by T. Ryder Smith.

The play had its UK premiere in June 2011 at The Arches (Glasgow). The production was directed by Stasi Schaeffer.

== Plot ==
Act 1

Jean is sitting quietly at a cafe when she becomes increasingly frustrated at the endlessly ringing cellphone on the table next to her. Its owner won't answer it and Jean soon realizes it is because he's dead. In her panic, she begins answering the persistent phone calls, including one from the dead man's mother, and finds out the man's name is Gordon. She sits with him until the ambulance arrives.

Jean attends Gordon's funeral and listens to a eulogy delivered by his rather blunt mother, Mrs. Gottlieb. During the funeral, Jean receives a call from a mysterious woman who asks to meet her. When Jean meets the woman, the woman confesses she was Gordon's mistress and wants to know his last words. In an effort to appease the woman, Jean lies and says Gordon's last words were declarations of love for his mistress. Gordon's cellphone rings and Jean answers. It is Gordon's mother inviting her over to talk.

Mrs. Gottlieb welcomes Jean into her home and begins asking several intrusive and bizarre questions. Jean tries to deflect and ends up pretending she's one of Gordon's co-workers. This alarms Mrs. Gottlieb for a moment. When Mrs. Gottlieb begins to get emotional, Jean tries to placate her with another lie about how Gordon called her the day he died because he wanted to talk to her. This wins Jean an invitation back to Mrs. Gottlieb's home that evening for dinner. Jean leaves to grab a few items from the cafe. When Dwight, Gordon's brother, and Hermia, Gordon's widow arrive for dinner, Jean presents them with the cafe items, claiming they are gifts from Gordon. The gift to Mrs. Gottlieb doesn't go over so well and she storms away. When Dwight attempts to serve Jean some roast, she confesses she's a vegetarian and Dwight finds them some caramel popcorn to eat instead. They begin to bond over stories of Gordon and their shared love of stationery. Dwight works at a stationery store and offers to take Jean there.

Jean and Dwight sit in the closet of the stationery store, feeling the paper. Dwight asks to braid Jean's hair and she agrees. While he braids, Jean talks about how she never owned a cellphone before and marvels at its ability to both bring people together and push them apart. Dwight demonstrates obvious disdain for his late brother but tears up when talking about him. Jean asks to see the braid and she and Dwight begin to kiss. Gordon enters the stage and opens his mouth to speak, but the lights go out before he can.

Act 2

Gordon speaks directly to the audience - outlining what happened the day he died. He expresses his disgust with the current state of the world and confesses he sells organs on the black market for a living. The day he died, he decided he wanted to go to the cafe for a lobster bisque only to find out Jean had ordered the last one, so he gets lentil instead. As he sits watching Jean eat her soup, he begins to suffer a heart attack and tries to think of whom to call. Not satisfied with calling anyone he knows, he dies while watching Jean eat the soup that was supposed to be his. He says she looked like an angel and he was glad she got the last bite. Then he dies.

Jean and Dwight hold each other after having sex in the closet of the stationery store. Dwight tells her he's been thinking about the letter "Z" and that it should be their code word if they are ever separated and want to find each other. He confesses that he loves her just as Gordon's cellphone rings. Jean answers it and tells the person on the other end that Gordon is dead. Dwight becomes increasingly frustrated as Jean ignores his pleas for her to hang up. When Jean finally hangs up Dwight tries to forbid her from using the phone anymore. Jean becomes angry and refuses. When the phone rings again she answers to hear Hermia who is calling because she's drunk at a bar and needs a ride home.

At the bar, Jean asks Hermia if she'd like to talk about Gordon. Hermia says yes but then begins to divulge extremely intimate details about her and Gordon's sex life to a visibly uncomfortable Jean. Hermia confesses she would often pretend to be someone else when she and Gordon had sex, specifically Gordon's mistresses. She accuses Jean of having an affair with Gordon which Jean denies. Hermia begins to break down. Overwhelmed with pity, Jean tells Hermia that Gordon wrote drafts of a letter to her on the day he died. She begins to improvise a love letter which she recites to Hermia. Hermia, now feeling much better, thanks Jean and then lets slip that Gordon sold organs for a living. Jean is appalled. The cellphone rings and Jean answers. A woman on the other end tells her there's a kidney for sale in South Africa and that she'll meet her in the airport of Johannesburg before hanging up. Jean tells Hermia she's going to South Africa to make up for Gordon's mistakes before rushing out. Hermia calls after her, "Do you own a gun?".

Jean arrives at the Johannesburg airport, only to be confronted by Gordon's mistress, now called The Stranger. The Stranger demands Jean give her the cellphone since it has all of Gordon's business contacts on it. When Jean refuses, they struggle and Jean ends up being smacked on the head by the Stranger. When Jean awakens, she's back in the cafe with Gordon sitting next to her - only now he can speak. He tells her she's in his "pipeline" because, after you die, you go straight to the person you love most. Jean tells Gordon she loved him because she didn't know him and, now that she does, she is horrified to be stuck with him for eternity. Jean says she's suddenly very lonely and Gordon points out that she can listen to cellphone conversations from the afterlife. Jean hears a bit of her first cellphone conversation with Mrs. Gottlieb and tells Gordon his mother truly loved him most. Gordon suddenly disappears into his mother's pipeline. Jean, left by herself, tries to call Dwight on the cellphone only for it to fail to turn on. In her frustration she yells "Z!" and wakes up back in the airport in Johannesburg with Dwight waiting for her.

Dwight brings Jean back to Mrs. Gottlieb's house and Mrs. Gottlieb tells Jean that Gordon's mistress made off with the cellphone and has taken over Gordon's organ business. Also, Hermia has left to join the Ice Capades. When Mrs. Gottlieb begins to tear up at the thought of everyone moving on but her, Jean tells Mrs. Gottlieb that she's seen Gordon in hell and that he's waiting for her in her pipeline. Overjoyed, Mrs. Gottlieb runs into the bonfire in the backyard so that she can be with Gordon. Jean is horrified but Dwight is happy his mother and his brother are together again. Jean and Dwight promise to love each other so they can be in each other's pipeline and Dwight offers to show Jean his new printing press saying, "Now, we kiss. And the lights go out."

=== Characters ===
- Gordon, a dead man
- Jean, a woman
- The Other Woman/The Stranger
- Hermia, Gordon's widow
- Mrs. Gottlieb, Gordon's mother
- Dwight, Gordon's brother

== Critical response ==
Robert Hurwitt, in reviewing a production in 2009 in San Francisco, wrote: "After one of her better plays, you exit the theater to enter a Ruhl world of ordinary people living extraordinary lives and small coincidences opening into quirky metaphysical conundrums.... Ruhl's gifts of probing humor, vivid imagination and poignant humanity are as alive here as in the luminous 'Eurydice' that Berkeley Rep took to off-Broadway and 'In the Next Room (or the Vibrator Play)'."
