= Davóne Tines =

American opera singer (born 1986)

- Born: December 20, 1986 (age 39); Portsmouth, Virginia, U.S.
- Education: Harvard University; Juilliard School
- Occupation: Operatic bass-baritone

Davóne Tines (born December 20, 1986) is an American operatic bass-baritone, known for creating roles in new works and for his collaborations with director Peter Sellars.

== Education ==
Tines was born December 20, 1986, in Portsmouth, Virginia. Raised in Orlean, Virginia, Tines sang with the First Providence Baptist Church choir there, played violin, and attended Fauquier High School in Warrenton, Virginia. from 2001 to 2005. He earned a bachelor's degree in sociology at Harvard University. Following undergraduate studies, Tines was an intern at the American Repertory Theatre, in Cambridge, Massachusetts. He then worked as production manager for the opera program at George Mason University, where he took voice lessons. He sang in the choir at the Basilica of the National Shrine of the Immaculate Conception. From 2011 to 2013, he studied voice for a master's degree as a student of Cynthia Hoffmann at the Juilliard School.

== Career ==
Tines came to international attention starring opposite Philippe Jaroussky in the Dutch National Opera premiere of Kaija Saariaho's opera Only the Sound Remains. He originated leading roles in the world premieres of operas including Matthew Aucoin's Crossing, John Adams' Girls of the Golden West, and Terence Blanchard's Fire Shut Up in My Bones. He co-created and starred in The Black Clown, a dramatic work adapted from the poem of the same name by Langston Hughes. In 2020, he created and co-composed VIGIL, a music video about Breonna Taylor that premiered on the Lincoln Center website and received its orchestral premiere by the Louisville Orchestra. In July 2025, Tine performed the role of Singer Oedipus in New York City's Little Island Amphitheater production of Bob Telson's and Lee Breuer's Gospel at Colonus.

In 2024, Tines released his debut solo album, Robeson, with his band, The Truth. The album is a tribute to bass-baritone and actor Paul Robeson.

In 2025, Tines began serving as artist in residence at the Barbican Centre. His first residency concert celebrated the work of fellow Black gay musician Julius Eastman, whose work he helped to revive with fellow members of the American Modern Opera Company.

== Honors ==
Tines received the 2018 Lincoln Center Emerging Artist Award and was named a 2019 Time Next Generation Leader. In 2020, he received a Sphinx Medal of Excellence and was a National Education Association Human & Civil Rights Awards Honoree. In 2024 Tines was awarded the Chanel Next Prize for his work as "a singer, creator and curator working in theatre and opera".

== Sponsorship ==
In 2020, Tines was featured in a TV spot for The Coca-Cola Company, titled 'Unbreakable', alongside Olympic gold medalist Simone Manuel.

== Personal life ==
Tines is openly gay. In 2024, he had the name of fellow bass-baritone Paul Robeson tattooed on his arm.
