= Crossing (opera) =

Opera by Matthew Aucoin

- Librettist: Matthew Aucoin
- Language: English
- Based on: Memoranda During the War by Walt Whitman
- Premiere: May 29, 2015; American Repertory Theater

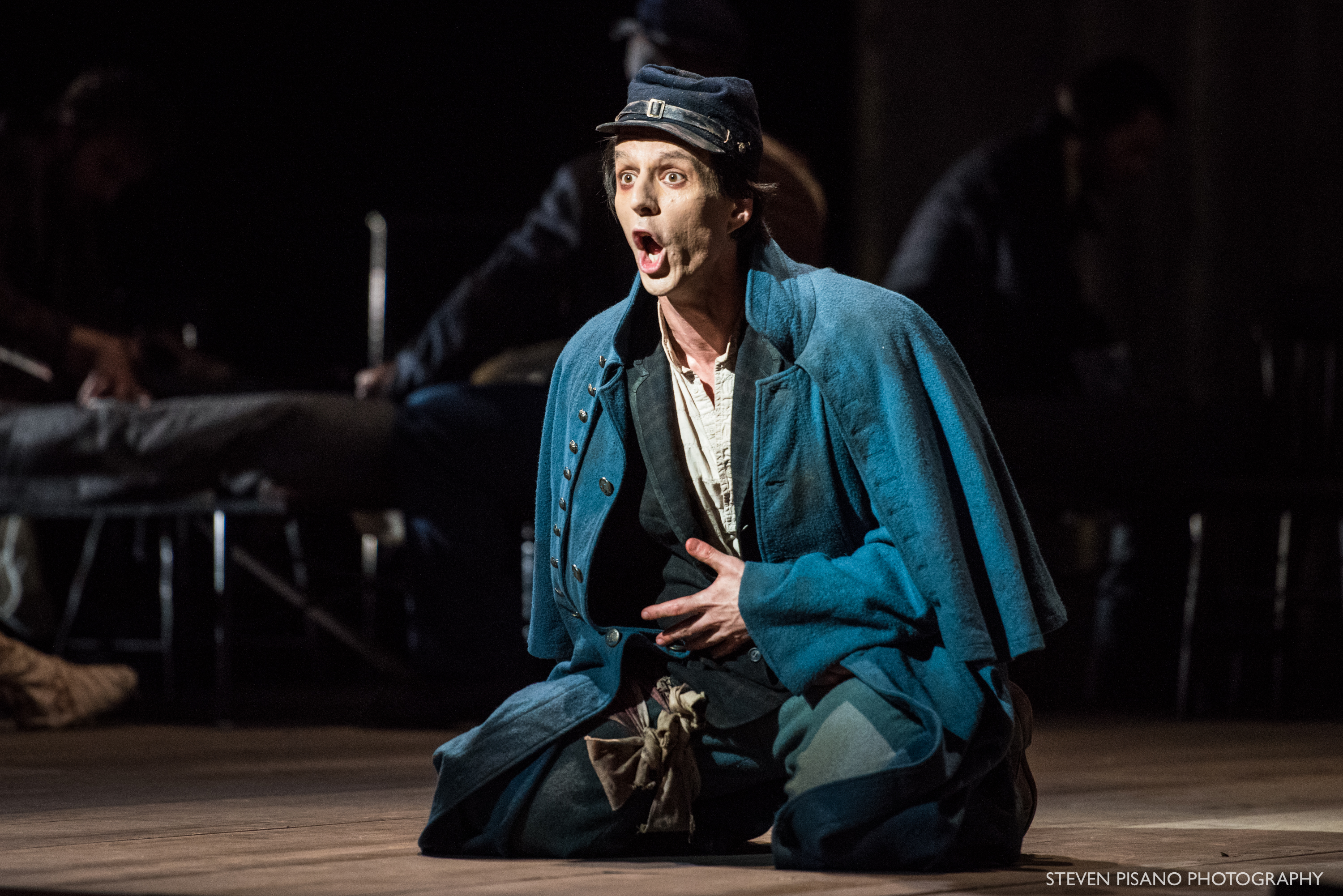
Dress rehearsal of Matthew Aucoin's Crossing at Brooklyn Academy of Music, 2016

Crossing is a two-act opera composed by Matthew Aucoin. Based on Walt Whitman's Memoranda During the War (1875), it offers a fictionalized account of Whitman's time as a nurse during the American Civil War.

== Performance history ==
Crossing premiered at the American Repertory Theater on May 29, 2015. Aucoin conducted the Boston-based chamber orchestra A Far Cry, Diane Paulus directed. Crossing had its New York premiere on October 3, 2017, at the Brooklyn Academy of Music Next Wave Festival. It was subsequently performed in concert form by the Los Angeles Opera on May 25, 2018, as a part of their Off Grand Series.

== Roles ==
Roles, voice types, premiere cast
Role	Voice type	Premiere cast, May 29, 2015 Conductor: Matthew Aucoin
Walt Whitman	baritone	Rod Gilfry
John Wormley	tenor	Alexander Lewis
Freddie Stowers	bass-baritone	Davóne Tines
Messenger	soprano	Jennifer Zetlan

== Synopsis ==
The opera opens with Whitman volunteering as a nurse at a Union hospital. John Wormley, a wounded soldier, appears at the hospital claiming to be a Union soldier and Whitman tends to his wounds. In the midst of Whitman's ministrations, the two become sexually intimate, and Whitman composes a letter on behalf of Wormley. Unbeknownst to Whitman, Wormley is in fact a Confederate soldier, and the letter will alert the Confederacy to the hospital's location so that they can destroy it. Wormley subsequently confronts Whitman, accusing him of perversion and questioning his motives. A messenger arrives to announce the war's end, and the shell-shocked soldiers react with muted enthusiasm.

== Reception ==
Anthony Tommasini of the New York Times called the work "taut" and "inspired", praising the performers, direction and score. Tommasini reserved particular praise for Aucoin's vocal writing and orchestration. Mark Swed of the Los Angeles Times termed the work "troublingly perceptive", while calling it "a young man’s work in both its impressive over-insistence and just plain over-insistence". Vulture's Justin Davidson called the work "dramatically static" and criticized its pacing. WBUR's Lloyd Schwartz criticized the work as "high-minded" and "inflated", though he praised the orchestration as "dazzling".

Several critics noted the influence of other composers on the score, including Benjamin Britten, John Adams, Philip Glass and Thomas Adès.
