= Eurydice =

Wife of Orpheus in Greek mythology

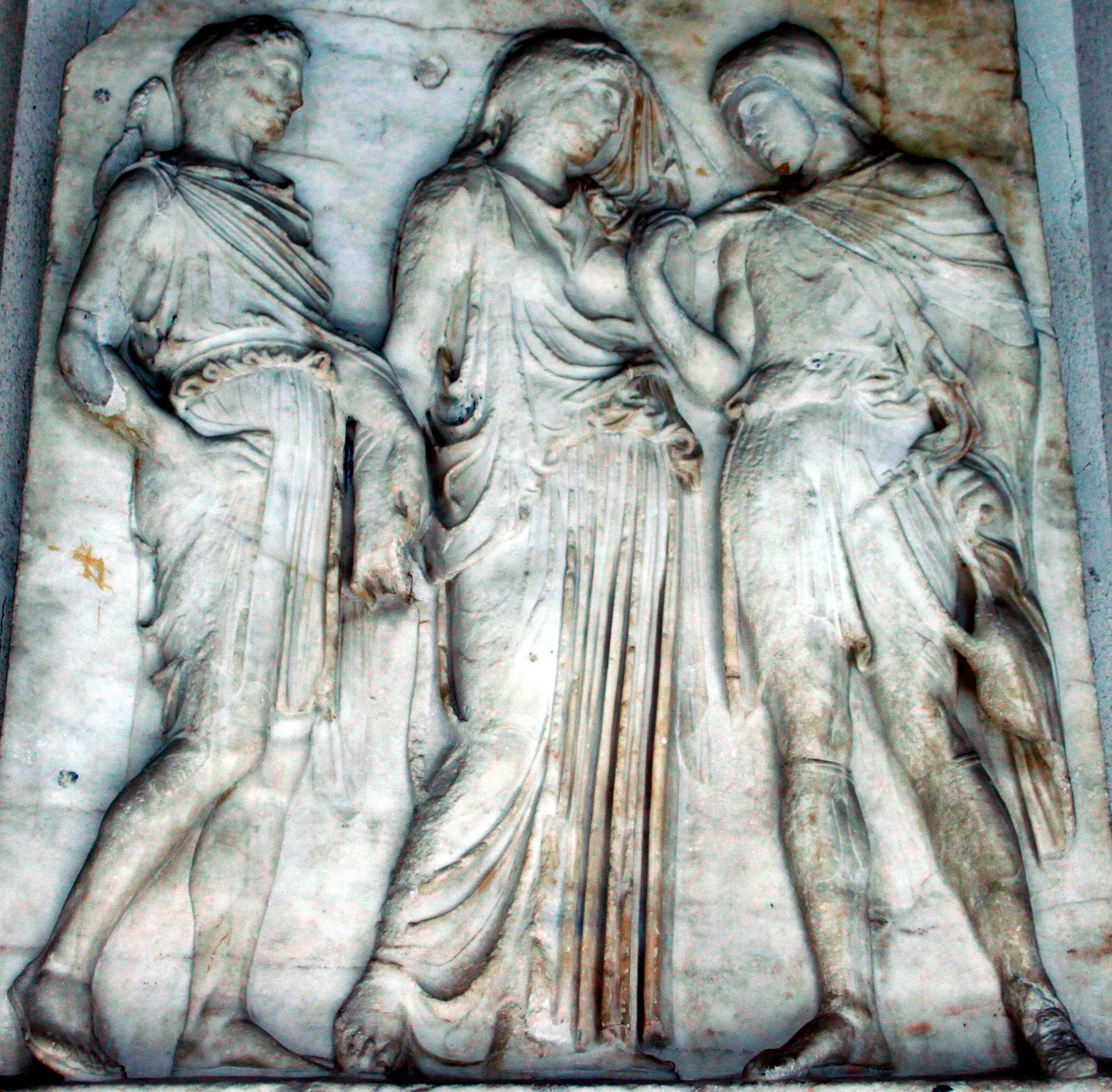
Eurydice with Orpheus and Hermes, 1st-century Roman marble relief in the Archaeological Museum of Naples, Italy.

Eurydice (/jʊəˈrɪdɪsiː/; Ancient Greek: Εὐρυδίκη 'wide justice', classical pronunciation: [eu̯.ry.dí.kɛː]) was a character in Greek mythology and the wife of Orpheus, whom Orpheus tried to bring back from the dead with his enchanting music.

== Etymology ==
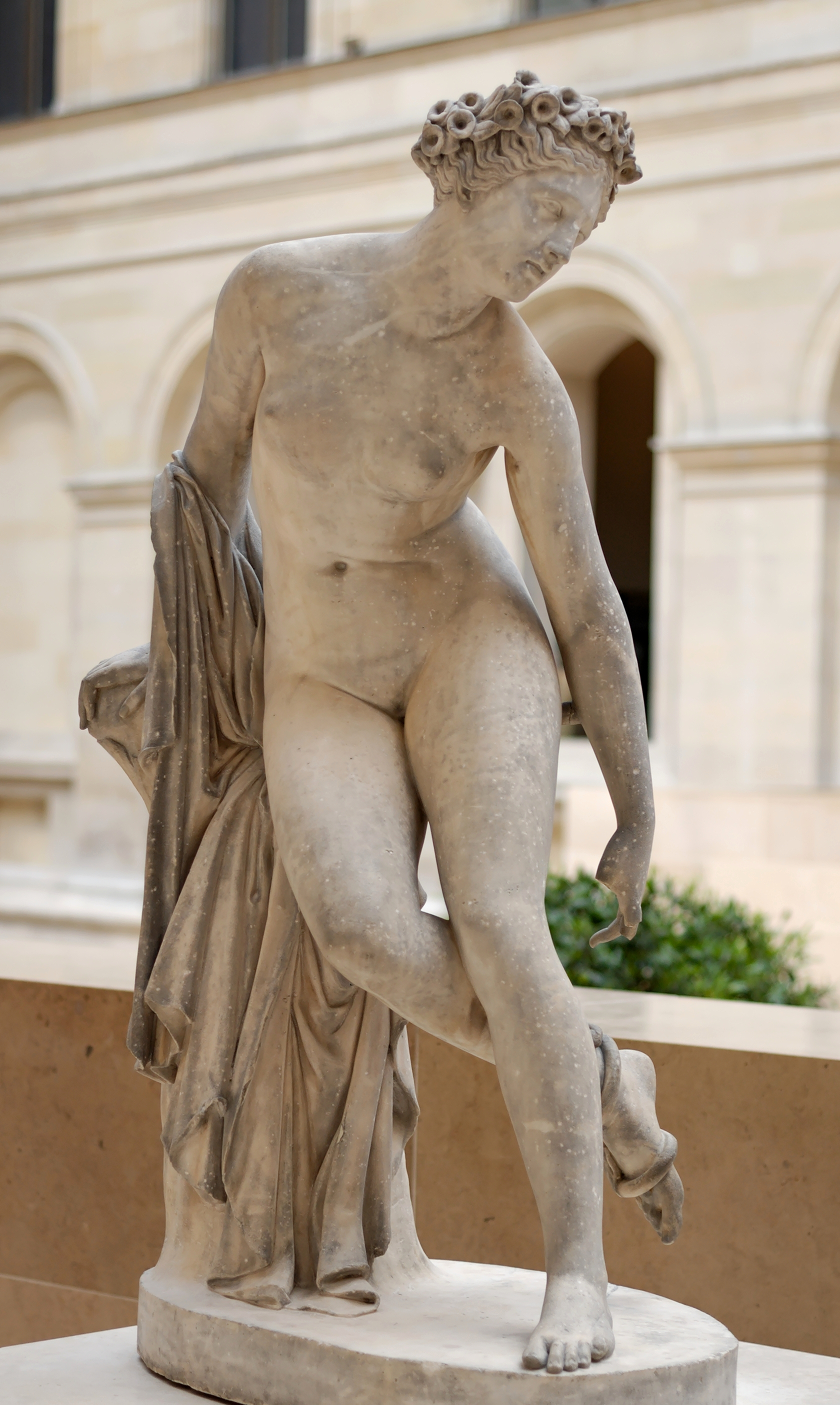
Charles-François Lebœuf, Dying Eurydice (1822), marble

Several meanings for the name Eurydice have been proposed such as "true judgment" or "profound judgment" from the Greek: eur dike. Fulgentius, a mythographer of the late 5th to early 6th century AD, gave the latter etymological meaning. Adriana Cavarero, in the book Relating Narratives: Storytelling and Selfhood, wrote that "the etymology of Eurydice seems rather to indicate, in the term eurus, a vastness of space or power, which, joining to dike [and thus deiknumi, to show], designates her as 'the one who judges with breadth' or, perhaps, 'she who shows herself amply.'"

== Mythology ==
=== Marriage to Orpheus, death and afterlife ===
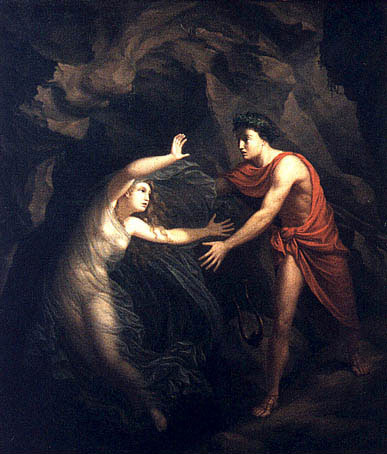
Christian Gottlieb Kratzenstein Stub, Orpheus and Eurydice, 1806, Ny Carlsberg Glyptotek, Copenhagen

Eurydice was the wife of musician Orpheus, who loved her dearly; on their wedding day, he played joyful songs as his bride danced through the meadow. One day, Aristaeus saw and pursued Eurydice, who stepped on a viper, was bitten, and died thereafter. Distraught, Orpheus played and sang so mournfully that all the nymphs and deities wept and told him to travel to the Underworld to retrieve her, which he gladly did. After his music softened the hearts of Hades and Persephone, his singing so sweet that even the Erinyes wept, he was allowed to take her back to the world of the living. In another version, Orpheus played his lyre to put Cerberus, the guardian of Hades, to sleep, after which Eurydice was allowed to return with Orpheus to the world of the living. Either way, the condition was attached that he must walk in front of her and not look back until both had reached the upper world. Soon, he began to doubt that she was there, suspecting that Hades had deceived him. Just as he reached the portals of Hades and daylight, he turned around to gaze on her face, and because Eurydice had not yet crossed the threshold, she vanished back into the Underworld. When Orpheus was later killed by the Maenads at the orders of Dionysus, his soul ended up in the Underworld, where he was reunited with Eurydice.

The story in this form belongs to the time of Virgil, who first introduces the name of Aristaeus and the tragic outcome. Other ancient sources, however, speak of Orpheus's visit to the underworld in a more negative light; according to Phaedrus in Plato's Symposium, the infernal deities only "presented an apparition" of Eurydice to him. Plato's representation of Orpheus is that of a coward; instead of choosing to die to be with the one he loved, he mocked the deities by trying to go to Hades to get her back alive. Since his love was not "true"—meaning he was not willing to die for it—he was punished by the deities, first by giving him only the apparition of his former wife in the underworld and then by being killed by women.

The story of Eurydice may be a late addition to the Orpheus myths. In particular, the name Eurudike ('she whose justice extends widely') recalls cult-titles attached to Persephone. The myth may have been derived from another Orpheus legend in which he travels to Tartarus and charms the goddess Hecate.

Eurydice's story has many strong universal cultural parallels, from the Japanese myth of Izanagi and Izanami, the Mayan myth of Itzamna and Ixchel, and the Indian myth of Savitri and Satyavan. While often compared to the Akkadian/Sumerian myth of Inanna's descent to the underworld, that tale is actually a parallel for Persephone's kidnapping by Hades because both "Inanna's Descent" and Persephone's kidnapping are cultural explanations for the changing seasons. The biblical story of Lot's wife, who was turned into a pillar of salt because she looked back at the town she was fleeing, is "often compared to the story of Orpheus and his wife Eurydice."

== Cultural depictions ==
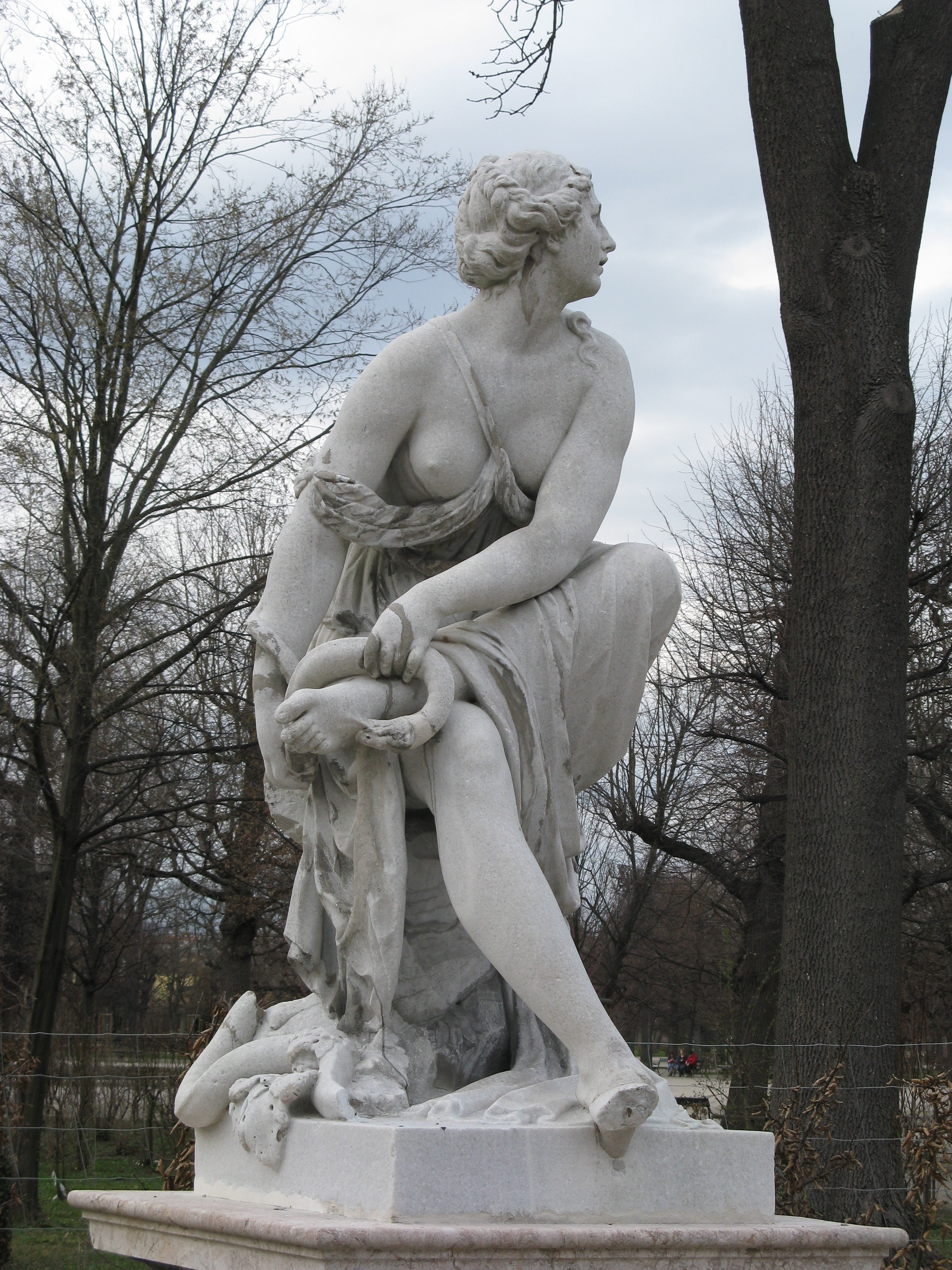
Statue of Eurydice at Schönbrunn Palace; note the snake biting her foot

The story of Orpheus and Eurydice has been depicted in a number of works by artists, including Titian, Peter Paul Rubens, Nicolas Poussin, and Corot. More recently, the story has been depicted by Bracha Ettinger, whose series, Eurydice, was exhibited in the Pompidou Centre (Face à l'Histoire, 1996); the Stedelijk Museum, Amsterdam (Kabinet, 1997), and The Royal Museum of Fine Arts, Antwerp (Gorge(l), 2007). The story has inspired ample writings in the fields of ethics, aesthetics, art, and feminist theory. In the game Hades (2020), the aftermath of the tale of Orpheus and Eurydice is told throughout a playthrough of the game.

=== Film and literature ===
- Sir Orfeo, a Middle English Romance poem from the late 13th or early 14th century, inspired by the Orpheus and Eurydice tale.
- Orpheus and Eurydice, a Middle Scots poem by Robert Henryson.
- "Orpheus. Eurydice. Hermes." (1904), a poem retelling the journey from the underworld by Rainer Maria Rilke
- "Eurydice" (1917), a feminist retelling of the myth from the perspective of Eurydice, written by modernist poet H.D.
- Orphée (1950), directed by Jean Cocteau
- Orfeu Negro (1959), an adaptation of the classic myth filmed in Brazil by Marcel Camus
- Saint Seiya (1985): in the Hades Chapter of Saint Seiya, the Silver Saint Lyra Orpheus pleads with Hades to resurrect his beloved Eurydice. Moved by Orpheus’ divine music, Hades grants his wish under one strict condition: neither of them may look back until they have fully crossed into the world of the living. As they reach the very edge between the Underworld and the surface, Orpheus—overwhelmed with emotion—breaks the rule and looks back to check on Eurydice. Instantly, she is turned into a half-stone figure, trapped once again in the Underworld and unable to return. Stricken by guilt and love, Orpheus chooses to remain with her in the Underworld. It is later revealed that this entire event was a scheme devised by Pandora, Hades' most trusted servant. Her goal was to ensure Orpheus stayed in the Underworld, stripping him of his allegiance to Athena’s Saints Army and bending him to Hades’ will.
- "Eurydice" (1999), a poem that retells the traditional myth through a feminist lens by British poet Carol Ann Duffy in her book The World's Wife
- Portrait of a Lady on Fire (2019) written and directed by Céline Sciamma uses the myth of Orpheus and Eurydice as an allegory for the relationship depicted in the film, and proposes an alternate explanation for why Orpheus turned to look
- Kaos (2024) is a modern-day adaptation of Greek mythology. Eurydice ("Riddy") no longer loves her husband Orpheus. She is killed and is unable to journey through the Underworld because Orpheus took the traditional coin intended to pay her passage. With Dionysus' help, Orpheus travels to the Underworld and despite her reluctance, Riddy returns to the living world with him to fulfil her role in the downfall of Zeus. The series was cancelled by Netflix after one season.

=== Operas and stage productions ===
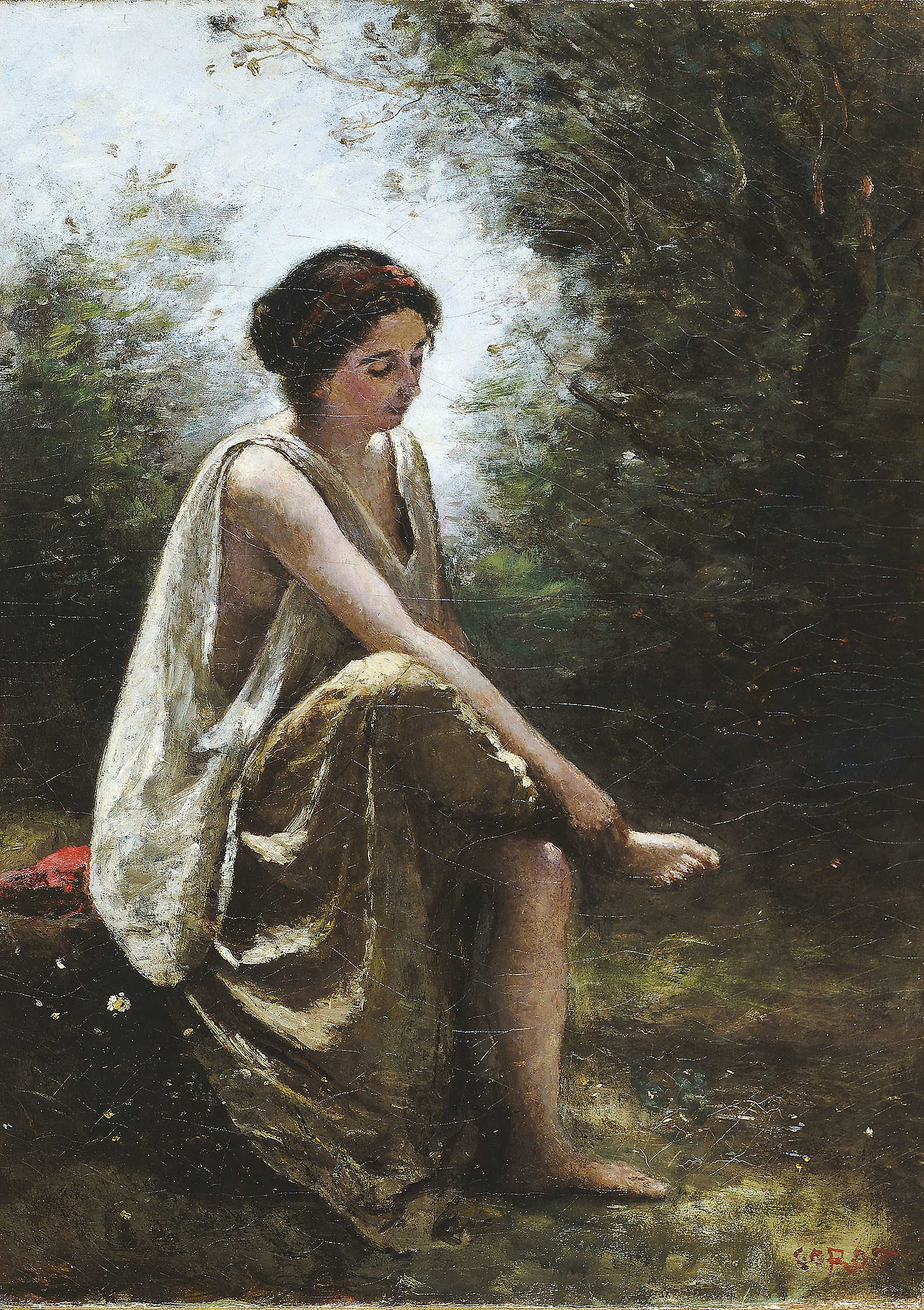
Jean-Baptiste-Camille Corot, Wounded Eurydice, 1868/70, Art Institute of Chicago, Chicago.

The myth has been retold in operas by Jacopo Peri, Monteverdi, Charpentier, Gluck, Yevstigney Fomin, Harrison Birtwistle, and Matthew Aucoin.

- Euridice (1600), an opera by Jacopo Peri, the first genuine opera whose music survives to this day
- Orfeo ed Euridice, an opera by Christoph Willibald Gluck
- L'Orfeo (1607), by Claudio Monteverdi, widely regarded as the first operatic masterwork
- La Descente d'Orphée aux enfers H.488 (1686), opera by Marc-Antoine Charpentier
- Orphée descendant aux enfers H.471 (1683), cantata by Marc-Antoine Charpentier
- Le Retour d’Euridice aux enfers (1717) by Charles Piroye
- Orfeo ed Euridice (1996), a new production of Gluck's opera by choreographer Mark Morris and the Handel and Haydn Society conducted by Christopher Hogwood.
- Eurydice (2003), a play by Sarah Ruhl, later made into an opera by Matthew Aucoin in 2020.
- Orpheus and Eurydice: A Myth Underground (2011), a theatre production written by Molly Davies with music by James Johnston, Nick Cave and the Bad Seeds for the National Youth Theatre at the Old Vic Tunnels, directed by James Dacre
- Hadestown (2010), an ensemble album by Anaïs Mitchell, featuring Mitchell as Eurydice, Justin Vernon as Orpheus and Ani DiFranco among others, retelling the myth as a 'folk opera' in a post-apocalyptic Depression era America. The album inspired a Broadway musical of the same name, which opened in 2019 and went on to win 8 Tony awards. Featuring Eva Noblezada as Eurydice and Reeve Carney as Orpheus

=== Science and geography ===
- Eurydice Peninsula in Antarctica is named after Eurydice.
- A species of Australian lizard, Ctenotus eurydice, is named after Eurydice.
- A species of snake native to Papua New Guinea, Gerrhopilus eurydice, is named after Eurydice.
- An asteroid 75 Eurydike is named after Eurydice.

=== Video games ===
- In Hades, a rogue-like game developed by Supergiant Games, Eurydice is a character who resides in Asphodel. Her appearance is that of an oak nymph, and she has an afro composed of tree branches. The player, Zagreus, is given the option of reuniting Eurydice and Orpheus after meeting them both.

== Additional sources ==
=== Primary sources ===
- Ovid, Metamorphoses 10
- The Library 1.3.2
- Pausanias, Description of Greece 9.30
- Virgil, Georgics 4.453
- Plato, Symposium

=== Secondary sources ===
- Buci-Glucksmann, Christine. 2000. "Eurydice and her Doubles: Painting after Auschwitz." In Artworking 1985-1999. Amsterdam: Ludion. ISBN 90-5544-283-6.
- Butler, Judith. [2001] 2004. "Bracha's Eurydice." Theory, Culture & Society 21(1).
  - Originally in de Zegher, Catherine, and B. Massumi, eds. 2001. Bracha Lichtenberg Ettinger: Eurydice Series, Drawing Papers 24. NY: Drawing Center.
- Duffy, Carol Ann. 1999. "Eurydice." In The World's Wife. ISBN 978-0-330-37222-0.
- Ettinger, Bracha L., and Emmanuel Levinas. [1997] 2006. "Qui Dirait Eurydice? What Would Eurydice say?: Brache Lichtenberg Ettinger in Conversation with Emmanuel Levinas." Philosophical Studies 2.
- Glowaka, Dorota. 2007. "Lyotard and Eurydice." In Gender after Lyotard, edited by M. Grebowicz. NY: Suny Press. ISBN 978-0-7914-6956-9
- Graves, Robert, The Greek Myths, Harmondsworth, London, England, Penguin Books, 1960. ISBN 978-0143106715
- Graves, Robert, The Greek Myths: The Complete and Definitive Edition. Penguin Books Limited. 2017. ISBN 978-0-241-98338-6, 024198338X
- Pollock, Griselda. 2009. "Orphée et Eurydice: le temps/l'éspace/le regard traumatique." In Guerre et paix des sexes, edited by J. Kristeva, et al. Hachette.
- —— "Abandoned at the Mouth of Hell." In Looking Back to the Future. G&B Arts. ISBN 90-5701-132-8.
- Rosand, Ellen. "Opera: III. Early opera, 1600–90." Grove Music Online, edited by L. Macy.
- Whenham, John. 1986. Claudio Monteverdi, Orfeo. Cambridge University Press. ISBN 0-521-28477-5
