= Sarah Ruhl =

American writer (born 1974)

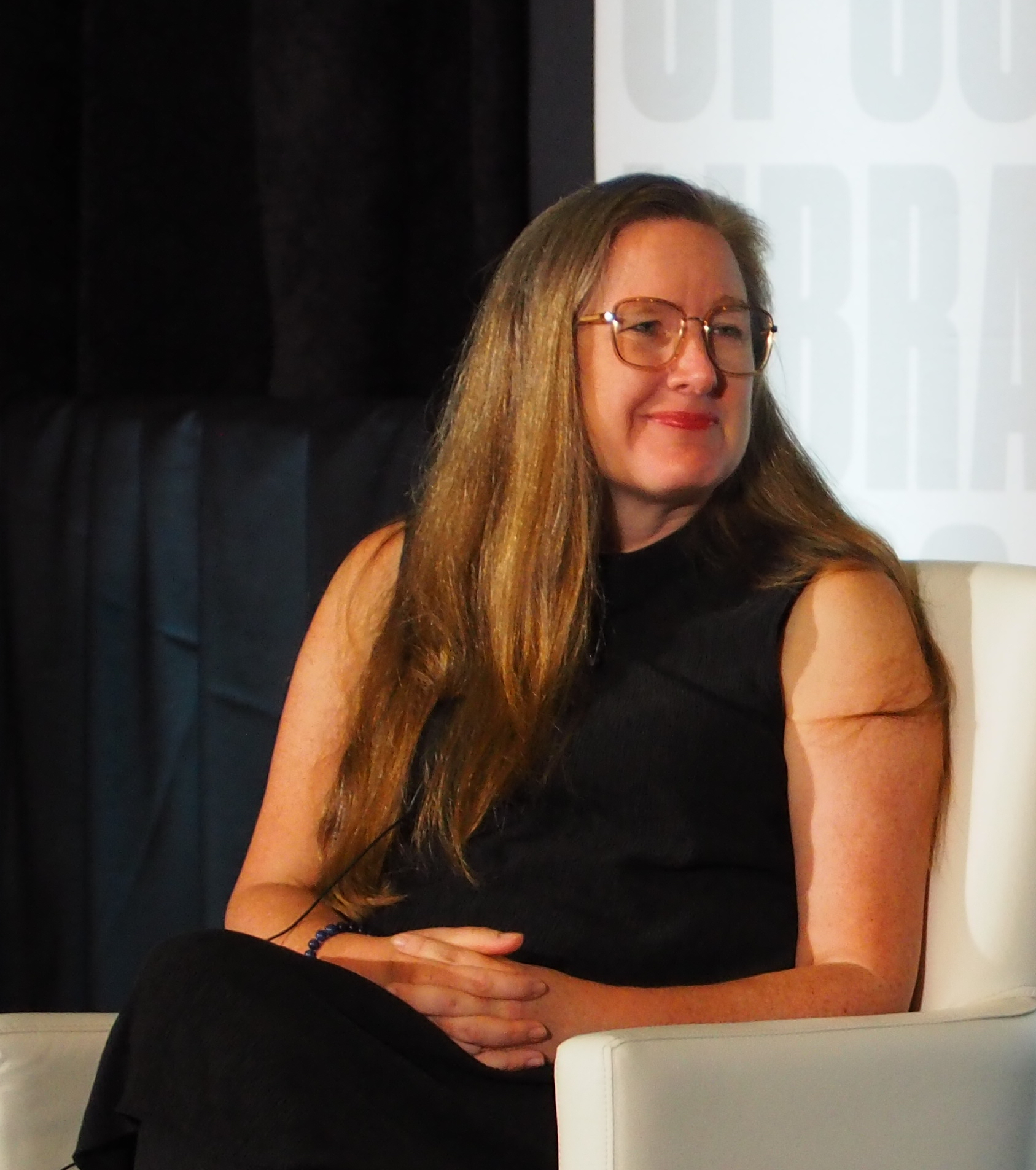
- Ruhl at the 2022 National Book Festival
- Born: January 24, 1974 (age 52); Wilmette, Illinois, U.S.
- Education: Brown University (BA, MFA)
- Occupations: Playwright; poet; essayist; professor
- Spouse: Tony Charuvastra (m. 2005)
- Children: 3
- Writing career
- Notable works: Melancholy Play (2001); Eurydice (2003); The Clean House (2004); Dead Man's Cell Phone (2007); In the Next Room (or the Vibrator Play) (2009)
- Notable awards: Whiting Award (2003): Susan Smith Blackburn Prize (2004); MacArthur Fellowship (2006); PEN/Laura Pels Theater Award (2008)
- Website: sarahruhlplaywright.com

Sarah Ruhl (born January 24, 1974) is an American playwright, poet, professor, and essayist. Among her most popular plays are Melancholy Play (2001), Eurydice (2003), The Clean House (2004), Dead Man's Cell Phone (2007), and In the Next Room (or the Vibrator Play) (2009). These works and others have been produced on and off Broadway and the West End.

Ruhl has been the recipient of a MacArthur Fellowship, the Susan Smith Blackburn Prize, a Whiting Award, and the PEN/Laura Pels Theater Award. She has twice been a finalist for the Pulitzer Prize for Drama (2005, 2010) and has been nominated for Tony Award for Best Play (2010). In 2020, she adapted her play Eurydice into the libretto for Matthew Aucoin's opera of the same name at the Metropolitan Opera. Eurydice was nominated for Best Opera Recording at the 2023 Grammy Awards.

In 2018, Milkweed Editions published Letters from Max: A Book of Friendship, which Ruhl co-authored with the late Max Ritvo. Ruhl subsequently adapted the book into a 2023 stage play, which was named a New York Times Critic's Pick. Her memoir Smile was published by Simon & Schuster, and was listed as one of Time Magazine's "100 Must-Read Books of 2021." She is currently the Premiere Writer-in-Residence at Signature Theatre Company. Since 2015, Ruhl has served on the playwriting faculty of the Yale School of Drama.

== Life ==
Ruhl was born in Wilmette, Illinois. Her mother, Kathleen Ruhl, studied theater at Smith College, earned a Ph.D. in Language, Literacy, and Rhetoric from the University of Illinois, and became an English teacher, as well as an actor and a theatre director. Her father, Patrick Ruhl, became a marketer of toys. Her older sister, Kate, is a psychiatrist.

Beginning in the fourth grade, Ruhl received dramatic training at the Piven Theatre Workshop, in Evanston, Illinois. Piven later produced her Melancholy Play in 2015. Ruhl attended Interlochen Arts Camp for several summers in her youth.

When Ruhl was twenty, in August 1994, her father died of cancer after fighting the disease for two years, which had a profound impact on her and her art. Ruhl had intended to become a poet, but after she studied under Paula Vogel at Brown University, she was persuaded to switch to playwriting. Her first play was The Dog Play, written in 1995 for one of Vogel's classes. She graduated from Brown University with a Bachelor of Arts in English (1997), with her undergraduate work including a year spent at Pembroke College, Oxford. She worked a variety of jobs for the next two years, including teaching art in public schools, before returning to Brown for her Master of Fine Arts in Playwriting (2001).

Sarah Ruhl currently teaches at the David Geffen School of Drama at Yale University and lives in Brooklyn with her family.

== Career ==
Orlando, an adaptation of the novel by Virginia Woolf, was commissioned by the Piven Theatre Workshop and premiered in Evanston, Illinois, in May 1998 featuring Justine Scarpa as Orlando. Director Joyce Piven later helmed the show again in March 2003 at The Actors' Gang, Hollywood, California, with Polly Noonan taking on the title role. The play was produced off-Broadway by the Classic Stage Company in 2010. In 2015, Orlando premiered for the Sydney Theatre Company at the Sydney Opera House with Jacqueline McKenzie playing the lead.

The Lady with the Lap Dog and Anna Around the Neck were commissioned and produced by the Piven Theatre Workshop in 2001. The two plays are Ruhl's stage adaptions of Anton Chekov short stories.

Late: A Cowboy Song was produced by Clubbed Thumb (New York City) in 2003.

The Cornerstone Theater Company (Los Angeles) commissioned Ruhl for a play about young people living in Los Angeles. Cornerstone presented the play, Demeter in the City, at REDCAT in June 2006. The play is based on the myth of Demeter and Persephone.

The Oldest Boy premiered in November 2014 at the Lincoln Center's Mitzi E. Newhouse Theater. The play was directed by Rebecca Taichman and starred Celia Keenan-Bolger and James Yaegashi.

Her play Scenes from Court Life, or The Whipping Boy and His Prince premiered at Yale Repertory Theatre on October 1, 2016, in previews, opened officially on October 6, and ran to October 22. The play, directed by Mark Wing-Davey, involves "privilege and politics in both 17th century Britain and current day America." The play was presented by the graduate acting class at the New York University Tisch School of the Arts in November 2015.

Her play How to Transcend a Happy Marriage premiered off-Broadway at Lincoln Center's Mitzi E. Newhouse Theater on February 23, 2017, in previews, and officially on March 20, 2017, directed by Rebecca Taichman. The cast featured Lena Hall, Marisa Tomei, Brian Hutchison, David McElwee, Naian González Norvind, Omar Metwally, Austin Smith, and Robin Weigert. The play, which takes place in New Jersey, is about two married couples.

For Peter Pan on her 70th birthday had its debut at Berkeley Repertory Theatre in May 2016 and then at the Shattered Globe Theatre at Theater Wit in Chicago in May 2017, starring Ruhl's mother Kathleen Ruhl. The play premiered off-Broadway at Playwrights Horizons on August 18, 2017 (previews), directed by Les Waters and starring Kathleen Chalfant and Lisa Emery.

Becky Nurse of Salem premiered at Berkeley Repertory Theatre on December 19, 2019, directed by Anne Kauffman and featuring Pamela Reed as the title character.

Ruhl is an active member of New Dramatists, a development space for new playwrights that is in partnership with the NYU Tisch Graduate Acting Program.

=== The Clean House ===
Ruhl gained widespread recognition for her play The Clean House (2004). The play centers married doctors who employ a Brazilian housekeeper who is trying to come up with the perfect joke. The husband then falls in love with one of his cancer patients and trouble ensues. It won the Susan Smith Blackburn Prize in 2004 and was a Pulitzer Prize finalist in 2005.

=== Eurydice ===
Eurydice (2004) was produced off-Broadway at the Second Stage Theater in June to July 2007. Prior to that it had been staged at Yale Rep (2006), Berkeley Rep (2004), Georgetown University, and Circle X Theatre. She wrote Eurydice in honor of her father, who died in 1994 of cancer. The play explores the use and understanding of language, an interest which she shared with her father:

Each Saturday, from the time Ruhl was five, Patrick took his daughters to the Walker Brothers Original Pancake House for breakfast and taught them a new word, along with its etymology. (The language lesson and some of Patrick's words—"ostracize," "peripatetic," "defunct"—are memorialized in the 2003 Eurydice, a retelling of the Orpheus myth from his inamorata's point of view, in which the dead Father, reunited with his daughter, tries to re-teach her lost vocabulary.)

Eurydice is Ruhl's version of the Orpheus and Eurydice legend. Talking stones serve as a Greek chorus. The play explores relationships, love, communication, the permeability between the worls of the living and dead, and the true meaning of life and the afterlife.

In 2020, Ruhl adapted the play as a libretto for a new opera composed by Matthew Aucoin. It premiered at the Los Angeles Opera on February 1, 2020, and at the Metropolitan Opera on November 23, 2021.

=== Passion Play ===
Ruhl's Passion Play cycle premiered at the Arena Stage, Washington, D.C., in 2005, directed by Molly Smith. It was next produced by the Goodman Theatre (Chicago) and Yale Rep (New Haven). Ruhl began writing Passion Play at age 21, while studying with Paula Vogel at Brown University. She did not finish the play until eight years later, after Wendy C. Goldberg and Molly Smith commissioned the third act. Passion Play made its New York City premiere in Spring 2010 in a production by the Epic Theatre Ensemble at the Irondale Center in Brooklyn. Each part of the trilogy depicts the staging of a Passion Play at a different place and during a different historical period: Elizabethan England, Nazi Germany, and the United States from the time of the Vietnam War until the present.

=== Dead Man's Cell Phone ===
Dead Man's Cell Phone (2007) premiered off-Broadway at Playwrights Horizons in 2008 starring Mary-Louise Parker. Its world premiere was at the Woolly Mammoth Theatre Company in 2007. It was subsequently produced by the Steppenwolf Theatre in 2008 and at the Oregon Shakespeare Festival in 2009. The play received a UK premiere at The Arches (Glasgow) in June 2011. The play explores technology and the disconnect people are experiencing in the digital age.

=== In the Next Room ===
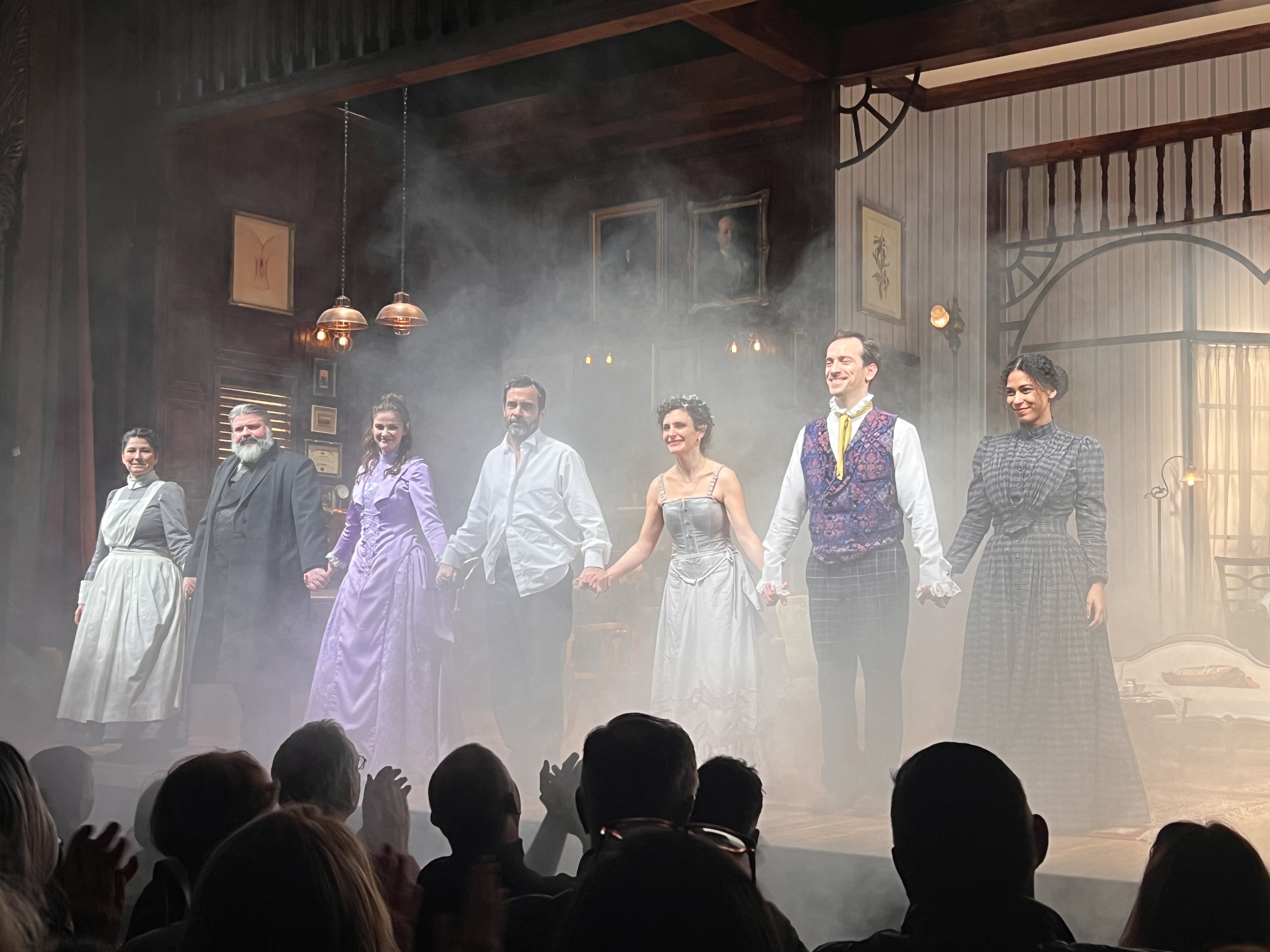
In the Next Room (or The Vibrator Play) at Vretania Theatre in Athens, Greece, 2025.

In the Next Room (or The Vibrator Play) premiered at Berkeley Rep in February 2009. The play opened on Broadway at the Lyceum Theatre with previews starting on October 22, 2009, and an official opening in November 2009. This marked Ruhl's Broadway debut. The play explores the history of the vibrator, developed as a treatment for hysteria. In the Next Room was a finalist for the 2010 Pulitzer Prize for Drama and was nominated for the 2010 Tony Awards for Best Play, Best Featured Actress in a Play, and Best Costume Design in a Play.

The play then moved to Sydney, Australia, and premiered for the Sydney Theatre Company with Jacqueline McKenzie in the title role. The production was directed by Pamela Rabe.

== Themes and style ==
In September 2006, Ruhl received a MacArthur Fellowship. The announcement of that award stated that she creates "vivid and adventurous theatrical works that poignantly juxtapose the mundane aspects of daily life with mythic themes of love and war."

John Lahr, in The New Yorker, wrote of Ruhl:

[If] Ruhl's demeanor is unassuming, her plays are bold. Her nonlinear form of realism—full of astonishments, surprises, and mysteries—is low on exposition and psychology. "I try to interpret how people subjectively experience life," she has said. "Everyone has a great, horrible opera inside him. I feel that my plays, in a way, are very old-fashioned. They're pre-Freudian in the sense that the Greeks and Shakespeare worked with similar assumptions. Catharsis isn't a wound being excavated from childhood."

In a discussion with Paula Vogel for BOMB Magazine, Ruhl described the psychology of her plays as "putting things up against Freud [...] it's a more medieval sensibility of the humors, melancholia, black bile, and transformation." Rather than "connect the dots psychologically in a linear way," Ruhl prefers to create emotional psychological states through transformation of the performance space.

== Personal life ==
In 2005, Ruhl married child psychiatrist Tony Charuvastra. He taught a course at NYU on marriage and divorce and sometimes included In the Next Room on his syllabus. Ruhl and Charuvastra have three children: Anna, William, and Hope.

Because of Bell's palsy, contracted after she gave birth to the twins, one side of her face is paralyzed. She wrote about her experience in her book Smile: The Story of a Face, a nonfiction memoir.

== Honors ==
In 2006, Ruhl received a MacArthur Foundation Fellowship.

Ruhl was awarded the Steinberg Distinguished Playwright Award for 2016. The Steinberg committee said: "Her work sparks conversation in audiences of all ages with its emotionally vivid language [...] Sarah Ruhl is unique. She fills her intelligent and highly theatrical plays with striking oddities and playful humor. Sarah is a prolific playwright of great distinction.

Ruhl was awarded the Residency 1 program by the Signature Theatre Company in 2019.

She has also received the following awards and nominations:

- 2003 Whiting Award
- 2004 Susan Smith Blackburn Prize for The Clean House
- 2005 Pulitzer Prize, finalist for The Clean House
- 2008 Helen Hayes Award for Dead Man's Cell Phone
- 2008 PEN/Laura Pels Theater Award
- 2010 Lilly Award
- 2010 Tony Award for Best Play, nomination for In the Next Room (or The Vibrator Play)
- 2010 Pulitzer Prize, finalist for In the Next Room (or The Vibrator Play)
- 2016 Samuel French Award for Sustained Excellence in American Theatre

== Works ==
=== Original Plays ===
- Dog Play (reading)
- Snowless
- Melancholy Play (2001)
- Virtual Meditations#1 (2002)
- Passion Play (2003)
- Eurydice (2003)
- Late: A Cowboy Song (2003)
- The Clean House (2004)
- Demeter in the City (2006)
- Dead Man's Cell Phone (2007)
- In the Next Room (or The Vibrator Play) (2009)
- Stage Kiss (2011)
- Two Conversations Overheard on Airplanes (short) (2013)
- The Oldest Boy (2014)
- Scenes from Court Life, or The Whipping Boy and His Prince (2016)
- How to Transcend a Happy Marriage (2017)
- For Peter Pan on her 70th Birthday (2017)
- Becky Nurse of Salem (2019)
- Letters From Max (2023)
- An Uplifting High School Graduation Speech (short) (2026)
- Faydra (2027)

=== Musicals ===
- Melancholy Play: A Chamber Musical (book writer and lyricist; composer Todd Almond) (2015)
- Wonder: The Musical (book writer; composers and lyricists Ian Axel and Chad King) (2025)
- The Interestings: The Musical (co-book writer with Meg Wolitzer; composer and lyricist Sara Bareilles) (2027)

=== Operas ===
- Eurydice (libretto; composer Matthew Aucoin) (2019)

=== Adaptations ===
- Lady with the Lap Dog, and Anna around the Neck (adapted from Anton Chekhov) (2001)
- Orlando (adapted from Virginia Woolf) (2003)
- Three Sisters (adapted from Anton Chekhov) (2011)
- Dear Elizabeth (adapted from Words in Air: The Complete Correspondence Between Robert Lowell and Elizabeth Bishop) (2012)

=== Films ===
- The Glorias (co-writer of screenplay) (2025)

=== Other works ===
- 100 Essays I Don't Have Time to Write on Umbrellas and Sword Fights, Parades and Dogs, Fire Alarms, Children, and Theater, Farber and Farber (2014)
- Letters from Max: A Book of Friendship (co-authored with Max Ritvo), Milkweed Editions (2018)
- 44 Poems for You, Copper Canyon Press (2020)
- Love Poems in Quarantine, Copper Canyon Press (2022)
- Smile: The Story of a Face, Simon & Schuster (2021)
- Lessons From My Teachers: From Preschool to the Present, Marysue Rucci Books (2025)
- The Dream I'll Dream Tonight, Simon & Schuster Books for Young Readers (2025)
