= Matthew Aucoin =

American composer (born 1990)

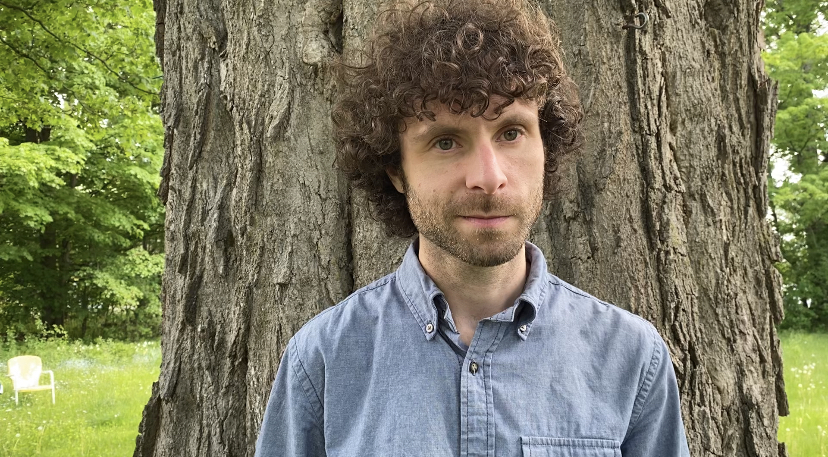
- Aucoin in 2021
- Born: April 4, 1990 (age 36)

Matthew Aucoin (born April 4, 1990) is a Visiting Professor of Composition and Conducting at Boston University. Aucoin has been commissioned by the Metropolitan Opera, Carnegie Hall, Lyric Opera of Chicago, the American Repertory Theater, the Peabody Essex Museum, Harvard University, and NPR's This American Life. He was appointed as Los Angeles Opera's first-ever Artist-in-Residence in 2016. He is a 2018 MacArthur Fellow.

== Biography ==
Aucoin was born and raised in the Boston area. While attending Medfield High School, he was the keyboardist in an indie rock band, Elephantom. He attended Harvard College, where he studied poetry, graduating summa cum laude in 2012. His mentors at Harvard included Jorie Graham and Helen Vendler. As an undergraduate, Aucoin conducted productions of Die Fledermaus and Le Nozze di Figaro with the Dunster House Opera Society, now known as Harvard College Opera.

Aucoin then received a graduate diploma from The Juilliard School, where he studied with composer Robert Beaser. Concurrently, he served as an assistant conductor at the Metropolitan Opera. Between 2013 and 2015, Aucoin was the Solti Conducting Apprentice at the Chicago Symphony Orchestra, where he studied with Riccardo Muti. In 2013, he was commissioned by the American Repertory Theater for the opera Crossing, based on Walt Whitman's Civil War diaries, and by Lyric Opera of Chicago for the children's opera Second Nature. Both operas premiered in 2015.

In 2015 and 2016, a number of Aucoin's chamber and orchestral works had their premieres, including Evidence at the Los Angeles Chamber Orchestra; his Piano Concerto, featuring pianist Conor Hanick and the Alabama Symphony; the song cycle Merrill Songs, premiered by tenor Paul Appleby at Carnegie Hall with the composer at the piano; and the violin sonata Its Own Accord, premiered by violinist Keir GoGwilt.

In 2016, Aucoin was appointed Artist-in-Residence at Los Angeles Opera. Between 2016 and 2020, he conducted several productions in Los Angeles, including Verdi's Rigoletto, Philip Glass's Akhnaten, and his own operas Crossing and Eurydice.

Co-written with librettist Sarah Ruhl, Eurydice was co-commissioned by The Metropolitan Opera and the Los Angeles Opera. It had its world premiere in Los Angeles in February 2020, conducted by the composer and starring Danielle de Niese. Eurydice had its Met premiere in November 2021, conducted by Yannick Nézet-Séguin and starring Erin Morley.

In 2017, Aucoin co-founded the American Modern Opera Company (AMOC) with the director Zack Winokur. He has also written instrumental music for such artists and ensembles as The Philadelphia Orchestra, the pianist Kirill Gerstein, the Brentano Quartet, the Philharmonia Baroque Orchestra, tenor Paul Appleby, countertenor Anthony Roth Costanzo, Zurich's Tonhalle Orchestra, and Chanticleer. He has appeared as a conductor with the Los Angeles Opera, the Santa Fe Opera, the Los Angeles Chamber Orchestra, the San Diego Symphony, and many other ensembles.

As a writer, Aucoin is a frequent contributor of musical criticism and other writings to The New York Review of Books, among other publications. His book The Impossible Art was published in 2021 by Farrar, Straus & Giroux.

== List of works ==
=== Opera ===
- Crossing (2015)
- Second Nature (2015)
- Eurydice (2020)

=== Orchestral ===
- This Same Light (2013)
- Evidence (2016)
- Concerto for Piano and Orchestra (2016)
- Exodos for Tony, for tenor and chamber orchestra (2021)
- The No One’s Rose, for four singers, three instrumentalists, and Baroque orchestra (2021)
- Eurydice Suite (2021)
- Music For New Bodies (2025)

=== Chamber music ===
- Poem for Violin, solo violin (with projected text) (2012)
- Three Whitman Songs, for baritone and piano (2013)
- Piano Trio (2014)
- The Orphic Moment, dramatic cantata for countertenor, solo violin, and chamber ensemble (2014)
- Celan Fragments, violin and piano (2014)
- Three Études for solo piano (2014)
- Dual, duet for cello and bass (2015)
- This Earth, for voice (countertenor or mezzo-soprano) and piano (2015)
- Merrill Songs, for tenor and piano (2015)
- This Earth, arranged for voice and quintet (flute, clarinet, violin, cello, piano) (2016)
- revolve, for solo violin (2016)
- “Finery Forge," for two pianos (2016)
- Its Own Accord, for violin and piano (2017)
- Treating Shadows as Solid Things, for a cappella choir (2017)
- Soft Power, for string quartet (2018)
- From a Desert, for solo cello (2018)
- With Care, for two violins (2018)
- String Quartet (2019)
- Revelations of Divine Love, Chapter 3, for baritone and piano (2020)
- Gallup (Na’nízhoozhí), for two singers and quintet (2021)
- Two Arias from Eurydice, for soprano and chamber ensemble (2021)
- The tracks have vanished, for solo piano (2022)
