= Opera in Venezuela =

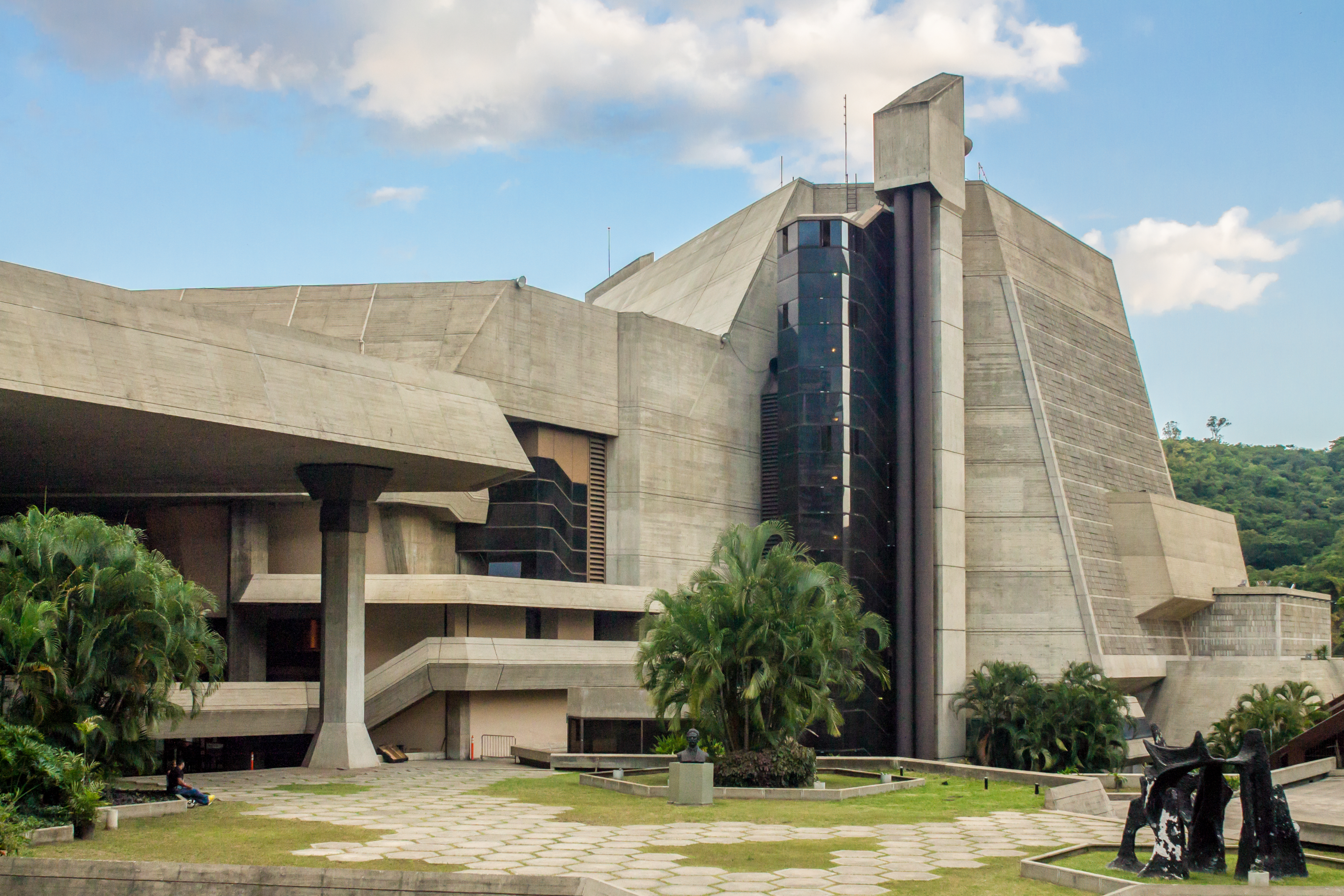
Teresa Carreño Cultural Complex, where Venezuelan operas are typically performed today

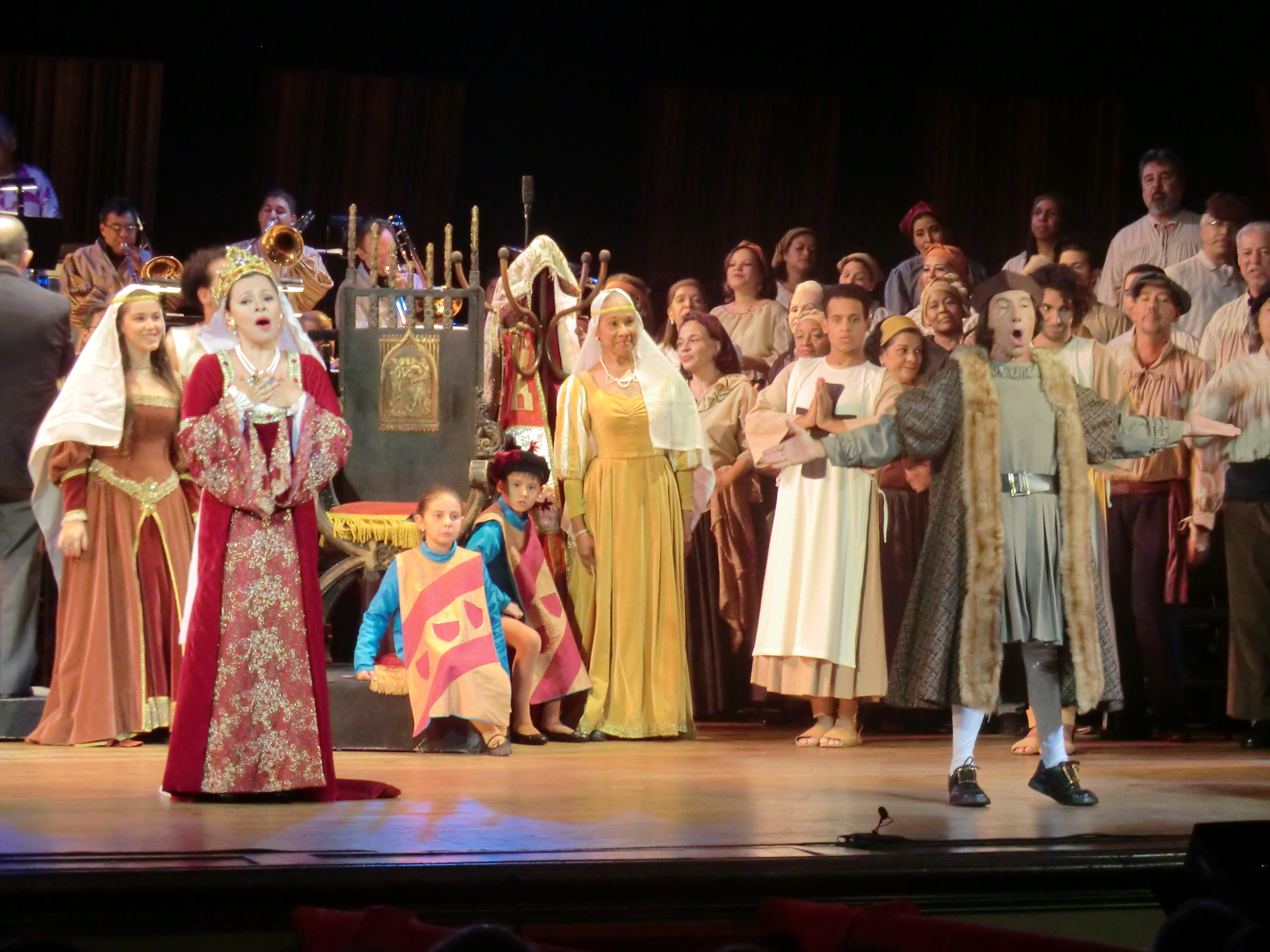
Opera buffa Los Martirios de Colón in the Municipal Theatre of Caracas, 2013

In Venezuela, since the opening of the Teatro Caracas and, earlier, the Teatro Maderero (then called Teatro de la Zarzuela), there has been a great lyrical tradition ranging from serious opera to operetta, zarzuela, and Spanish musical reviews.

== History ==
The first Venezuelan opera was El maestro Rufo Zapatero an opera buffa composed in 1848 by José María Osorio. Virginia by José Ángel Montero (sometimes incorrectly called the first Venezuelan opera) debuted in 1877, under the auspices of Antonio Guzmán Blanco. Another major early Venezuelan opera composer was Reynaldo Hahn, who was greatly influenced by his teacher Jules Massenet. He greatly expanded the genre of French operetta, of which Ciboulette was his most famous work; he also composed operas as Le Merchand de Venise.

Before the foregoing had occurred, José María Osorio had composed early zarzuelas. The first Venezuelan zarzuela to debut, however, was José Ángel Montero's Los alemanes en Italia, in the 1860s. Montero also debuted the zarzuelas El Cumpleaños de Leonor, El Charlatán Mudo, La Modista, and many others. Another major zarzuela composer was Pedro Elías Gutiérrez, who used Venezuelan rhythms. His most important work was perhaps Alma Llanera, with lyrics by Rafael Bolívar Coronado.

In the 20th century, Caracas had a rich cultural tradition. Teatro Maderero, Teatro Caracas, and the more modern Teatro Nacional and Teatro Municipal competed for the public's attention. The Teatro Maderero and Teatro Caracas, after the construction of the latter two, played a secondary role and were nearly always used for popular musical acts, such as reviews and fandango. The Teatro Nacional was the theater for the country's finest zarzuela, while the Municipal typically staged Italian, German and French works, which were more serious. Today Venezuelan operas are typically held in the Teatro Teresa Carreño.

Contemporary Venezuelan opera composers include María Luisa Escobar, whose works include Kanaime, Orquídeas Azules, and Princesa Girasol. Other important composers are Hector Pellegatti (author of the verismo opera El Negro Miguel with lyrics by Pedro Blanco Vilariño), Alexis Rago (author of El Páramo, Miranda, and Froilán el Infausto), Eric Colon (author of El Caballero de Ledesma), Federico Ruíz (author of the famous opera buffa Los martirios de Colón, with a libretto by Aquiles Nazoa).

Other recent premieres include the opera Gertrudis by Gerardo Gerulewicz, with a libretto by Xiomara Moreno, which premiered in concert and in full stage production in Caracas, Venezuela.

Venezuelan-American composer Sylvia Constantinidis who has written music and libretto for several lyrical works: two dramatic contemporary operas, Araminta and Afrodita; one experimental short opera, Aurora; and three children operas, Lincoln, Ponce de Leon, and The First ThanksGiving. Some scenes from Araminta were premiered in concert in England 2017. Afrodita was premiered in concert in England 2015 and in Miami, USA, also in 2015. Aurora, the experimental short opera, was premiered in England in 2011. The three children operas: Lincoln, Ponce de Leon, and The First ThanksGiving, were all premiered in Florida, USA, in 2001, 2002, and 2003. For these three children operas Constantinidis received the Educator of Note Award 2003 by the Ethel and W. George Kennedy Family Foundation, and the Young Patronesses of the Opera, the Florida Grand Opera. In 2024 Ángel Hernández Lovera premiered the ópera Alice conducted by Elisa Vega.

== Venezuelan lyric singers ==
The sopranos Fedora Alemán, Cecilia Nuñez, Flor García, Aurra Cipriani, Reyna Calanche, Leila Mastrocola, Hilda Breer, Beatriz Michelena, Carmen Hurtado, Inés Salazar, Margot Pares-Reyna, Rosita del Castillo, Rosa Savoini, Alba Simara, Sara Catarine, Thays Vergara and Lola Linares, mezzo-sopranos Morella Muñoz, Nancy Fabiola Herrera, Teresa Carreño, Mariela Valladares, and Aida Navarro, contralto Isabel Palacios, the tenors Fernando Michelena, Alfredo Sadel, Carlos Almenar Otero, Aquiles Machado, Nico Castel, Rubén Domínguez, Ruben Malnez, Idwer Alvarez, Manuel Pérez, David Hidalgo, Eduardo Melgar, Edgar Bastidas, Sergio Duran, Julio Felce, Gregory Pino, Víctor López, Ugo Corsetti, Francisco Morales and Blas Martínez, baritones Ramón Iriarte, Francisco Salazar, William Alvarado, Sergio Daniele, Gaspar Colón Moleiro and Cayito Aponte, Jorge Páez and bass Daniel Bendahan, Claudio Muskus, Pedro Liendo, Julio César Mármol, Samuel Jones, Yunis Sujur and Carlos Maury.

== Venezuelan conductors ==
Gustavo Dudamel, Reynaldo Hahn, Gonzalo Castellanos Yumar, Carlos Mendoza, Eric Colon, Alexis Rago, Atanasio Bello Montero, Ángel Sauce, Eduardo Rahn, Havid Sanchez, Primo Casale, Angelo Pagliucca, Isabel Palacios, Elisa Vega, Alfredo Rugeles, Eduardo Marturet, Carlos Riazuelo, Cesar Ivan Lara, Rafael Payare, Rodolfo Saglimbeni, Teresa Carreño, Diego Matheuz, Felipe Izcaray.

== See also ==
- Opera in Latin America
