= María Guinand =

Venezuelan choral conductor

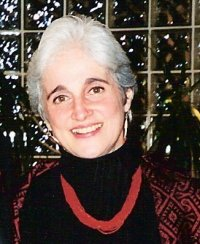

Maria Guinand (born 1953 in Caracas, Federal District, Venezuela) is an internationally renowned choral conductor.

María Guinand received her bachelor's and master's degrees in music from the University of Bristol, England, in 1976 and 1982, respectively. Guinand then earned a Choral Conductor Diploma from the Youth Orchestra Academy in Caracas in 1980.

Her leadership positions have included being the dean of the Jose Angel Lamas Music School and of the Simón Bolívar University in Caracas where she is a professor of music. In Venezuela, she conducts the Cantoría Alberto Grau, the Orfeón Universitario Simón Bolívar, and the Schola Cantorum de Venezuela. Guinand served as the conductor of the Festivalensemble Choir for The European Music Festival from 2001 to 2004. She has served on the executive committee of the International Music Council of UNESCO, and as vice president for Latin America and first vice-president in the International Federation for Choral Music. She was the principal organizer of the Americas Cantat III held in Caracas in 2000.

Guinand is widely known from her association with La Pasión según San Marcos (St. Mark Passion) composed by Osvaldo Golijov. The piece was commissioned by Helmuth Rilling to commemorate the 250th anniversary of the death of J.S. Bach. It was premiered at the 2000 European Music Festival with the Schola Cantorum de Caracas (now of Venezuela) and the Orquesta La Pasión. Infused with the rhythms of both the popular and classical music of Latin America, La Pasión is a singular work and has been performed around the world under Guinand's direction.

In 1996, Guinand conducted the world premiere of Golijov's Oceana Cantata for Vocalist, Boy Soprano, Chorus, and Orchestra, as part of the Oregon Bach Festival held in Eugene, Oregon, US. She has edited a series of Latin American choral pieces available from Earthsongs.

Hänssler released a recording of the Golijov Pasión in 2001, and a new recording by Deutsche Grammophon is forthcoming. Her recording of Golijov's Pasión según San Marcos was nominated in the 44th Annual Grammy Awards (2002) in the Best Choral Performance category, and in the 3rd Annual Latin Grammy Awards (2002) in the Best Classical Album category.

In 2006, Guinand worked with John Adams and Peter Sellars as choir master in the world premiere of A Flowering Tree in Vienna, Austria and in its 2007 recording with the London Symphony Orchestra for Nonesuch Records.

== Childhood and youth ==
María Guinand was born in Caracas on 3 June 1953. She started her musical studies at seven years old receiving piano lessons with Alberto Grau and Cristina Vidal Pereira, as well as beginning her formal studies at the Juan Manuel Olivares School of Music in Caracas under the tutelage of Angel Sauce and Gonzalo Castellanos. She also studied history and aesthetic of music at the same school under Eduardo Plaza Alfonzo, counterpoint in the Juan José Landaeta School of Music under Primo Casale and choral conducting at the Choral School for the Youth Orchestras Conservatoire under Alberto Grau. In 1972, she founded and conducted her first choir: Coral Colegio San José de Tarbes, which she conducted for two years before leaving to England to start her Bachelor in Music at Bristol University.

== Beginning of her professional career ==
Guinand attended Bristol University between 1973 and 1976 where she earned her Bachelor of Arts degree in music; there she focused on history and composition as well as orchestral and choral conducting, piano and voice. After graduation, she came back to Venezuela and started an intense activity becoming a teacher for music theory and solfeggio at the José Lorenzo Llamozas School of Music as well as sub-director of the Schola Cantorum de Caracas. The same year, 1976, she founded the Cantoría Alberto Grau, a choir subscribed to the Fundación Schola Cantorum de Caracas, a non-profit organization dedicated to the promotion of choral music in Venezuela, and founded the Cantoría Universitaria Simón Bolívar, a choir born within the Universidad Simón Bolívar campus in Caracas and also founded the Coral Banco Latino for the homonymous bank institution.

During the 1970s, she was also a teacher of musical analysis and choral conducting at the Conservatory for the National Youth Orchestras that would later be known as FESNOJIV (El Sistema), teacher of history of music at the José Ángel Lamas School of Music and also became a professor of music at the Universidad Simón Bolívar. She toured with the Cantoría Alberto Grau to Curaçao and Aruba and to Guayaquil (Ecuador) with the Cantoría Universitaria Simón Bolívar. She released her first recording called Retablo Navideño Vol I and Vol II with the Cantoría Alberto Grau, a portrait of Christmas music.

In 1980, she obtained her degree in choral conducting from the Conservatory of Music of the National Youth Orchestras (Venezuela) and in 1981 her Master in Music degree from the Bristol University (England) under the tutelage of Alberto Grau and Whyndham Thomas, respectively. During this decade she became Coordinator of Choral Activities for the Fundación Schola Cantorum de Caracas, Member of the International Federation for Choral Music, Advisor for the Institute for Musical Studies University (Caracas); Associated Director and Coordinator for the Choral Symphonic Performances of the Simón Bolívar Symphony Orchestra. In 1983, she became Principal Director of the Schola Cantorum de Caracas and of the Orfeón Universitario Simón Bolívar.

During the 1980s she toured extensively with her choirs, participating in the Fifth Festival Choruses of the World (US), VIII Europa Cantat (Belgium), XIII Día Internacional del Canto Coral (Spain), IX Musique-en-Morvan (France), Aberdeen International Youth Festival (Scotland), IX Europa Cantat (France), XI Choralies A Choeur Joie (France), 1st World Choral Symposium (Austria), Festival de Música Religiosa"(Colombia).

In 1989, María Guinand conducted the Cantoría Alberto Grau as they participated in the III International Choral Competition in Neuchâtel, Switzerland where they won the First Prize in the Women Voices Category and the Grand Jury Prize Novum Castellum; they then departed to participate in the XXXVIII International Choral Competition Guido D’Arezzo, winning four prizes including First Prize in the Vocal Ensemble and Soloists category and First Prize in the Popular Choral Music category.

== World recognition ==
As coordinator of the choral symphonic performances of the Simón Bolívar Symphony Orchestra, during the 1990s, María Guinand prepared the choirs for many performances in Venezuela and abroad for renowned conductors such as: Eduardo Mata, Alberto Grau, Simon Rattle, Helmuth Rilling, Claudio Abbado, Edmon Colomer, Krzysztof Penderecki and Gustavo Dudamel among others.

In 1992, she founded two important projects for the promotion of academic music in Venezuela: the Academia Bach de Venezuela, Venezuela's chapter of the Internationale Bachakademie Stuttgart, and the Academia Nacional de Canto Gregoriano and the Coral Fundación Empresas Polar. During these years, she was invited as a lecturer, guest conductor or to dictate workshops in many choral festival around the world such as: Festival Musique-en-Morvan (France), II World Choral Symposium (Sweden), Oregon Bach Festival (US), Palomar College Choir (US), Dale Warland Singers (US) and III Choral World Symposium (Canada). She became director of the Simón Bolívar Conservatory of Music, director of the Academic Programme for the National Youth Orchestras System of Venezuela (FESNOJV), the world-renowned music program in Venezuela named as El Sistema, and director of the José Ángel Lamas School of Music. During this decade she also became president of the Fundación Movimiento Coral Cantemos.

In 1996, she was invited by the Oregon Bach Festival and Helmuth Rilling to conduct the World Premiere of "Oceana", a cantata by Osvaldo Golijov. Also this year, two important projects for the musical education in Venezuela: the Musical Center for the Children Orchestras in Montalbán, Caracas as part of the El Sistema and her promoted project for the Master in Music degree in the Universidad Simón Bolívar, where she became a professor, coordinator of the Master in Music and Member of the Superior Council. She also became a member of the board of directors of the Teatro Teresa Carreño and of the Fundación Cultural Chacao. She continued touring extensively and publishing a number of recording during these years.

In 1997, she was awarded the Kulturpreis by the Inter Nationes Foundation (now known as Goethe-Institut Inter Nationes) from Germany and toured as conductor, lecturer and teacher to ACDA National Convention (US), Des Moines International Children's Choral Festival (US), Festival Internacional de Tunja (Colombia) and the XVIII International Course on Gregorian Chant (Italy). In following years she conducted as guest conductor the New Hampshire College Choir (US), Sacramento Master Singers (US), Musica del Mendrisiotto (Switzerland), World Youth Choir (Belgium, Germany and Sweden), Oklahoma State University Choir (US) and the ACDA Convention Youth Honor Choir (US). She lectured at the IV World Symposium for Choral Music (Netherlands) and was artist-in-residence at the Des Moines Children's Festival (US).

In 2000 she was awarded the Robert Edler Prize for Choral Music in Germany, she then was invited to conduct the world première of the La Pasión según San Marcos (St. Mark Passion) by Osvaldo Golijov at the European Musikfest Stuttgart, Germany. In this year, she also conducted the Orfeón Universitario Simón Bolívar during the First Choral Olympic Games held in Linz, Austria, where they won three gold medals. She was the president of the America Cantat II Festival held in Caracas during 2000 and artistic director of the Summer Session of the World Youth Choir also held in Caracas in 2001. During these years, she was guest conductor of the Taipei National Concert Choir (Taiwan, Taipei), the Festivalensemble Choir European Musikfest (Germany); Minnesota Chorale (US), Singapore Youth Choir (Singapore), Choir RTVE (Spain), Vox Aurea (Spain) and Radio Chor (Belgium); jury member of the International Choral Competition in Maasmechelen, Belgium, International Choral Competition (Tolosa, Spain) and National Choral Competition (Japan); she also became a member of the Artistic Committee for the 6th World Choral Symposium and a member of the board for the UNESCO International Music Council.

She was first vice-president of the International Federation for Choral Music during 2002–2005. She conducted the "Pasión según San Marcos" by Osvaldo Golijov in the US, Australia, Italy, the Netherlands, England, Portugal, and Venezuela and prepared the choir for the World Premiere of the opera "A Flowering Tree" by John Adams (composer), held in Vienna in 2006 and then performed again at the Barbican Centre in London in 2007.

Between 2003 and 2008, she was Guest Conductor of the Festivalensemble Choir Europeanmusikfest, (Stuttgart, Germany); Youth Choral Academy, Oregon Bach Festival (Eugene, Oregon, US), Women's Choral Festival, Alliance for Understanding (Salt Lake City, US), Repertory Singers (Edmonton, Canada); Jury Member CBC Choral Competition (Toronto, Canada); Guest Conductor New Zealand Chamber Choir (Auckland, New Zealand); Radio Choir (Louvain, Belgium), University of Miami (US), Festival 500 (Newfoundland, Canada); Director Concerts Andean Youth Choir (Bolivia, Ecuador); Guest Conductor Repertory Singers (Edmonton, Canada), Berkshire Choral Festival (US); Guest Conductor Vocalessence (Minneapolis, US); Member of the Artistic Committee 8th World Choral Symposium; Guest Conductor University Voices Festival (Toronto, Canada); University of Oregon Choirs (Eugene, Oregon, US), Workshops and Masterclasses at the ACDA Convention (Grand Rapids, US), University of Oregon (Eugene, Oregon, USA); Liederkranz (Oregon, US), Gottemburg Musik Academy (Sweden), Pollyfollia Festival (Normandie, France), 8th World Choral Symposium (Copenhaguen, Denmark).

In 2009, she was awarded the Helmuth Rilling Prize by the Internationale Bachakademie Stuttgart (Germany). She conducted the "Pasión según San Marcos" by Osvaldo Golijov in the Canary Islands Festival (Spain) and participated with the Cantoría Alberto Grau in the ACDA National Convention (Oklahoma, US); She also was invited to conduct the Coro Nacional de España as part of the I Ciclo de Música Coral at the Auditorio Nacional de Música (Madrid, Spain).

More recently, she was selected to conduct the 2021 ACDA National HS SATB Choir in Dallas, Texas.

== Discography ==
Guinand has participated in numerous recordings being credited in different ways as follows:

- Credited as conductor in:
  - Cantoría Alberto Grau. CD recorded in 1990 by Cantoría Alberto Grau. Published by Ediciones Fundación Schola Cantorum de Caracas. Caracas, Venezuela.
  - Misa de Réquiem (Juan Bautista Plaza)/Missa São Sebastião (Heitor Villa-Lobos). CD recorded by Cantoría Alberto Grau. Published in 1992 by Ediciones Fundación Schola Cantorum de Caracas. Caracas, Venezuela.
  - Alberto Grau. Composiciones Corales. Recorded by Orfeón Universitario Simón Bolívar, Schola Cantorum de Caracas, Cantoría Alberto Grau. Published in 1993 by Ediciones Fundación Schola Cantorum de Caracas. Caracas, Venezuela.
  - Cantemus. CD recorded in 1994 by Cantoría Alberto Grau. Published by Ediciones Fundación Schola Cantorum de Caracas. Caracas, Venezuela.
  - Nees/Grau. CD recorded in 1996 by Schola Cantorum de Caracas, Cantoría Alberto Grau and Orfeón Universitario Simón Bolívar. Published by Ediciones de la Fundación Schola Cantorum de Caracas. Caracas, Venezuela.
  - Música en Argos. XV Aniversario. CD recorded in 1997 by various artists including a track by Cantoría Alberto Grau. Published by Universidad Simón Bolívar.
  - La Pasión según San Marcos (Osvaldo Golijov). CD recorded in 2000 by Schola Cantorum de Caracas, Cantoría Alberto Grau, Orquesta La Pasión and soloists. Published in 2001 by Hänssler Classic. Germany.
  - Aguinaldos Tradicionales. Recorded by Schola Cantorum de Caracas and Cantoría Alberto Grau. Published in 1998 by Ediciones Fundación Schola Cantorum de Caracas. Caracas, Venezuela.
- Credited as choir master/choir coordinator in:
  - Atlàntida (Manuel de Falla-Ernesto Halffter). CD recorded in 1992 by Joven Orquesta Nacional de España with Choruses and Soloists. Edmon Colomer, Conductor. Published by Valois-Auvidis, France.
  - La Cantata Criolla (Antonio Estévez)/Chôros No. 10 (Heitor Villa-Lobos). CD recorded by Simón Bolívar Symphony Orchestra of Venezuela with Choruses and Soloists. Eduardo Mata, Conductor. Published in 1992 by Dorian Discovery. New York, USA.
  - La Vida Breve (Manuel de Falla). CD recorded by the Simón Bolívar Symphony Orchestra of Venezuela with Choruses and Soloists. Eduardo Mata, Conductor. Published in 1994 by Dorian Recordings. New York, USA.
  - Carmina Burana (Carl Orff). CD recorded in 1995 by Orquesta Sinfónica Gran Mariscal de Ayacucho with Choruses and Soloists. Alberto Grau, Conductor. Published by Universidad Simón Bolívar. Caracas, Venezuela.
  - Todo Beethoven. CD recorded by Orquesta Sinfónica Gran Mariscal de Ayacucho with Choruses and Soloists. Rodolfo Saglimbeni, Conductor. Published in 1995 by Contraloría General de la República. Caracas, Venezuela.
  - Todo Vivaldi. CD recorded by Orquesta de Cámara de Venezuela, Orquesta Jóvenes Arcos de Venezuela with Choruses and Soloists. Igor Lanz, Conductor. Published in 1996 by Contraloría General de la República. Caracas, Venezuela.
- Credited as choir director and artistic director in:
  - A Flowering Tree (John Adams). CD recorded in 2007 by the London Symphony Orchestra, Schola Cantorum de Venezuela and soloists. John Adams, Conductor. Published by Nonesuch Records.
- Credited as conductor and musical director in:
  - Canto al Nuevo Mundo. CD recorded in 1997 by Orfeón Universitario Simón Bolívar. Published by Equinoccio: Ediciones de la Universidad Simón Bolívar. Caracas, Venezuela.
  - Canto Gregoriano. CD recorded in 1997 by Cantoría Alberto Grau. Published by Ediciones Fundación Schola Cantorum de Caracas. Caracas, Venezuela.
  - XXX Aniversario Orfeón Universitario Simón Bolívar 1970–2000. Enhanced CD recorded in 2000 by Orfeón Universitario Simón Bolívar. Published by Universidad Simón Bolívar. Caracas, Venezuela.
- Credited as conductor, producer and recording supervisor in:
  - Inicios. CD recorded in 1997 by Coral Fundación Polar. Published by Fundación Polar. Caracas, Venezuela.
- Credited as conductor and producer in:
  - Latinoameicana XX. Recorded by Cantoría Alberto Grau. Published in 1997 by Fundación Schola Cantorum de Caracas. Caracas, Venezuela.
  - Música de Latinoamérica. María Guinand, Editor. CD recorded by various choral societies and conductors. Published in 1998 by Earthsongs. Oregon, USA.
- Credited as conductor, repertoire selection, music and art coordination, lyric writing and translations in:
  - Antología de Obras Corales Alberto Grau. Volume I. Voces Mixtas. CD recorded by various choral societies and conductors. Published in 2007 by Ediciones de la Fundación Schola Cantorum de Venezuela. Caracas, Venezuela.
  - Antología de Obras Corales Alberto Grau. Volume II. Voces Femeninas. CD recorded by various choral societies and conductors. Published in 2007 by Ediciones de la Fundación Schola Cantorum de Venezuela. Caracas, Venezuela.
  - Antología de Obras Corales Alberto Grau. Volume IV. Arreglos, Versiones Corales y Composiciones sobre Temas Populares. CD recorded by various choral societies and conductors. Published in 2007 by Ediciones de la Fundación Schola Cantorum de Venezuela. Caracas, Venezuela.
  - Latinoamericana XXI. CD recorded by Cantoría Alberto Grau and Schola Cantorum de Venezuela. Published in 2007 by Ediciones de la Fundación Schola Cantorum de Venezuela. Caracas, Venezuela.
- Credited as repertoire selection, music and art coordination, lyric writing and translations in:
  - Antología de Obras Corales Alberto Grau. Volume III. Música para Niños. CD recorded by various choral societies and conductors. Published in 2007 by Ediciones de la Fundación Schola Cantorum de Venezuela. Caracas, Venezuela.
- Credited as repertoire selection and general coordinator in:
  - Schola Cantorum de Caracas. Antología Uno. CD Recorded by Schola Cantorum de Caracas. Alberto Grau, Conductor. Published in 1997 by Ediciones de la Fundación Schola Cantorum de Caracas. Caracas, Venezuela.
  - Schola Cantorum de Caracas. Antología Dos. CD Recorded by Schola Cantorum de Caracas. Alberto Grau, Conductor. Published in 1997 by Ediciones de la Fundación Schola Cantorum de Caracas. Caracas, Venezuela.
- Credited as conductor, repertoire selection and general coordinator in:
  - Cantoría Alberto Grau. Antología Veinte Años. CD recorded by Cantoría Alberto Grau. Published in 1997 by Ediciones de la Fundación Schola Cantorum de Caracas. Caracas, Venezuela.
- Credited as general coordinator in:
  - Música Coral Latinoamericana. CD Recorded by Schola Cantorum de Caracas. Alberto Grau, Conductor. Published in 1997 by Ediciones de la Fundación Schola Cantorum de Caracas. Caracas, Venezuela.
  - Requiem Alemán (Johannes Brahms). CD recorded in 1997 by various choral societies. Alberto Grau, Conductor. Published by Ediciones de la Fundación Schola Cantorum de Caracas. Caracas, Venezuela.
- Credited as conductor, art director and script writer in:
  - Movimiento Coral Venezolano. Una Retrospectiva. Recorded by various choirs and conductors. Published in 1999 by Movimiento Coral Cantemos and Fundación Schola Cantorum de Caracas. Caracas, Venezuela.

== Awards and nominations ==
- 1989 Neuchâtel International Festival Choral (Switzerland): won First prize Female Voices Choir Category (Conducting Cantoría Alberto Grau)
- 1989 Neuchâtel International Festival Choral (Switzerland): won Grand Jury Prize "Novum Castellum" (Conducting Cantoría Alberto Grau)
- 1989 XXXVII Concorso Polifonico Internazionale "Guido d’Arezzo" (Italia): won First Prize 16th century Chamber Music Category (Conducting Cantoría Alberto Grau)
- 1989 XXXVII Concorso Polifonico Internazionale "Guido d’Arezzo" (Italia): won First Prize Folk Music Category (Conducting Cantoría Alberto Grau)
- 1989 XXXVII Concorso Polifonico Internazionale "Guido d’Arezzo" (Italia): won Third Prize 16th century Sacred Music Category (Conducting Cantoría Alberto Grau)
- 1989 XXXVII Concorso Polifonico Internazionale "Guido d’Arezzo" (Italia): won Third Prize 19th and 20th century Music Category (Conducting Cantoría Alberto Grau)
- 1989 Orden Andrés Bello in its First Class. Medal of Honor granted by the Ministry of Education of Venezuela
- 1992 Orden Diego de Losada. Medal of Honor granted by the Governor of Caracas, Venezuela
- 1997 won Inter Nationes Foundation Kulturpreis (Germany) for life achievements
- 2000 won Robert Edler Preis für Chormusik (Germany) for life achievements
- 2000 1st Choir Olympics Linz (Austria): won gold medal in Category 7 "Mixed Chamber Choirs" (Conducting Orfeón Universitario Simón Bolívar)
- 2000 1st Choir Olympics Linz (Austria): won gold medal in Category 20 "Contemporary Music" (Conducting Orfeón Universitario Simón Bolívar)
- 2000 1st Choir Olympics Linz (Austria): won gold medal in Category 27 "Folklore with Instrumental Accompaniment" (Conducting Orfeón Universitario Simón Bolívar)
- 2002 3rd Annual Latin Grammy Awards (US): nominated in the Best Classical Album Category for her recording of Osvaldo Golijov's "La Pasión según San Marcos".
- 2002 44th Annual Grammy Awards (US): nominated in the Best Choral Performance Category for her recording of Osvaldo Golijov's "La Pasión según San Marcos".
- 2003 Helpmann Awards (Australia): nominated in the Best Classical Concert Presentation Category for her presentation of Osvaldo Golijov's "La Pasión según San Marcos" in the Sydney Opera House during the Sydney Festival.
- 2009 Helmuth-Rilling-Preis (Germany): Won this prize in its first edition. It was granted by the Internationale Bachakademie Stuttgart for life achievements in music.
