= Schola Cantorum de Venezuela =

Schola Cantorum de Venezuela (SCV; formerly known as Schola Cantorum de Caracas) is one of the most important choral societies belonging to the growing choral movement in Venezuela. The SCV began in 1967. Its founding members included composer Alberto Grau, a Venezuelan composer and conductor born in 1937 in Barcelona, Spain; and Venezuelan composer Ana Rugeles among others. Currently, the choir is conducted by María Guinand (chief conductor) and Ana María Raga (associate conductor), with the assistance of young conductors Pablo Morales Daal and Victor Leonardo Gonzalez. Schola Cantorum de Venezuela works under the sponsorship of the Fundación Schola Cantorum de Venezuela, a Non-Profit Organization that oversees several other choirs such as: Cantoría Alberto Grau, Pequeños Cantores de la Schola and Schola Juvenil. Together they provide a complete system to promote and develop choral music in Venezuela.

To date, SCV has a repertoire of more than 50 major symphonic-choral works and has performed under the batons of highly acclaimed conductors such as Sir Simon Rattle, Claudio Abbado, Gustavo Dudamel, Krzysztof Penderecki, Helmuth Rilling, Robert Spano, John Adams and Edmon Colomer among others. In 1996, SCV performed the world premiere of Oceana by Osvaldo Golijov under the direction of María Guinand in the Oregon Bach Festival. In 2000, at the Europäisches Musikfest Stuttgart, SCV premiered "La Pasión según San Marcos" by Osvaldo Golijov under the direction of María Guinand. The recording of this concert received two Grammy nominations in 2002. In 2006, SCV was invited to the New Crowned Hope Festival in Vienna to premiere the opera A Flowering Tree, composed and conducted by acclaimed American John Adams. Produced by Peter Sellars, a second edition of the work was performed at the Barbican Centre in London in 2007. New recordings for La pasión según San Marcos and A Flowering Tree have been recorded and were released in 2008 by Deutsche Grammophon and Nonesuch labels, respectively.

== Recordings ==
SCV has recorded numerous LPs, Audio tapes and CDs as follows:

- Aguinaldos venezolanos. Volumen 1 (LP, 1969).
- Villancicos y canciones profanas del renacimiento español (LP, 1971).
- Aguinaldos y villancicos. Volumen 2 (LP, 1974).
- Obras del XXII Concurso Guido D'Arezzo (LP, 1974).
- Antología del madrigal venezolano. Volumen 1 (LP, 1975).
- Antología del madrigal venezolano. Volumen 2 (LP, 1975).
- Tomás Luis de Victoria y otros autores (LP, 1982).
- Antología O Magnum Mysterium (Audio Tape, 1984).
- Schola Cantorum en concierto. Volumen 1 (Audio Tape, 1985).
- Schola Cantorum en concierto. Volumen 2 (Audio Tape, 1985).
- Scholatinoamericana (Audio Tape, 1985).
- Concierto de Navidad (Audio Tape, 1985).
- Cantata Criolla de Antonio Estévez - Chôros No. 10 de Heitor Villa-Lobos, Conductor: Eduardo Mata, Orquesta Sinfónica Simón Bolívar, CD, Dorian Recordings [DIS-80101], 1992. Grammophone UK Review:
  It's all very exciting, and the performers include an excellent baritone, a rather tight-voiced tenor and a good chorus... the performance is infinitely superior too, both orchestrally and chorally
- Composiciones Corales de Alberto Grau, Conductors: Alberto Grau y María Guinand, CD, Fundación Schola Cantorum de Caracas, 1992. [Tracks performed by: 1. La Doncella, 2. Dies Irae, 3. Pater Noster].
- La vida breve de Manuel de Falla, Conductor: Eduardo Mata, Orquesta Sinfónica Simón Bolívar, CD, Dorian Recordings [DOR-90192], 1994.
- Carmina Burana de Carl Orff, Conductor: Alberto Grau. Orquesta Sinfónica Gran Mariscal de Ayacucho, CD, Universidad Simón Bolívar, 1995.
- Todo Beethoven, Sinfonía No. 9 in re minor, Op. 125 (Choral) by Ludwig van Beethoven, Conductor: Rodolfo Saglimbeni, Orquesta Sinfónica Gran Mariscal de Ayacucho, CD, Contraloría General de la República, 1995.
- Todo Vivaldi, Gloria RV589 by Antonio Vivaldi, Conductor Igor Lanz, Orquesta de Cámara de Venezuela, Orquesta Jóvenes Arcos de Venezuela, CD, Contraloría General de la República, 1996.
- Nees/Grau, Composiciones corales de Vic Nees y Alberto Grau, CD, Fundación Schola Cantorum de Caracas, 1996. [Tracks performed by SCV: 7. Magnificat (Vic Nees), 8. Dies Irae (Alberto Grau), 9. Pater Noster (Alberto Grau)].
- Requiem Alemán de Johannes Brahms, Conductor: Alberto Grau, Orquesta Sinfónica Simón Bolívar, CD, Fundación Schola Cantorum de Caracas, 1997.
- Antología 30 años, Volumen Uno. Música venezolana y latinoamericana, Conductor: Alberto Grau, CD, Fundación Schola Cantorum de Caracas, 1997.
- Antología 30 años. Volumen Dos. Música polifónica universal, Conductor: Alberto Grau, CD, Fundación Schola Cantorum de Caracas, 1997.
- Música coral latinoamericana del siglo XX, Conductor: Alberto Grau, CD, Fundación Schola Cantorum de Caracas, 1997.
- Música de Latinoamérica, collection of Latin American works published by earthsongs, produced by María Guinand, CD, earthsongs, 1998. [Tracks performed by SCV: 1. Mata del ánima sola (Antonio Estévez), 3. Salmo 150 (Ernani Aguiar), 4. Canciones de Cuna (Alberto Grau), 5. Te quiero (Alberto Favero), 6. Miué rendeira (Carlos Alberto Pinto Fonseca), 7. Salseo (Oscar Galián), 9. Alma Llanera (Pedro Elías Gutiérrez)].
- Aguinaldos tradicionales, Conductor: Alberto Grau, CD, Fundación Schola Cantorum de Caracas, 1998. [Tracks performed by SCV: 1. Niño lindo, 2. Cantemos alegres, 3. Niño venturoso, 4. El gallo, 5. La sirena, 6. Al llegar aquí, 7. Alegres cantemos].
- Movimiento Coral Venezolano, Una retrospectiva, Anthology collection of several Venezuelan choruses, CD, Fundación Schola Cantorum de Caracas, 1999. [Tracks performed by SCV: 8. Laetitia (Vicente Emilio Sojo), 9. Al mar anochecido (Gonzalo Castellanos), 11. Pescador de almas (Modesta Bor), 12. Fulía de Cumaná (folklore)].
- La pasión según San Marcos de Osvaldo Golijov, Conductor: María Guinand, Orquesta La Pasión, CD, Hänssler Classic [CD 98.404], 2001. Grammophone UK Review:
  Maria Guinand obtains a spirited response from the forces that Golijov has assembled‚ notably the sensuously expressive singing of Samia Ibrahim and the incisive contribution of the Schola Cantorum of Caracas.
- Latinoamericana XXI, CD, Fundación Schola Cantorum de Venezuela, 2007.
- Antología de obras corales de Alberto Grau. Volumen 1: Voces mixtas, CD, Fundación Schola Cantorum de Venezuela, 2007.
- Antología de obras corales de Alberto Grau. Volumen 2: Voces femeninas, CD, Fundación Schola Cantorum de Venezuela, 2007.
- Antología de obras corales de Alberto Grau. Volumen 3: Música para niños, CD, Fundación Schola Cantorum de Venezuela, 2007.
- Antología de obras corales de Alberto Grau. Volumen 4: Arreglos, versiones corales y composiciones sobre temas populares, CD, Fundación Schola Cantorum de Venezuela, 2007.
