= Virginia (Montero) =

- Opera by José Ángel Montero
- Librettist: Domenico Bancalari
- Language: Italian
- Premiere: 26 April 1873; Teatro Caracas

Virginia (1873) is an opera in four acts with music by Venezuelan composer José Ángel Montero and libretto, in Italian, by Domenico Bancalari. It is believed to be the first opera ever composed in Venezuela, and was first performed in the Teatro Caracas on April 26, 1873. The plot of the opera deals with despotic power and social injustice.

In 1969, the opera was revived in the Teatro Municipal de Caracas with the soprano Fedora Alemán in the title role. Later it was recorded, and revived again in July 2003, in a setting by the Compañía Nacional de Ópera Alfredo Sadel and the Teresa Carreño Cultural Complex, with Elizabeth Almenar, Cayito Aponte and Amelia Salazar in the principal roles.

== 1969 recording ==
- Virginia: Fedora Alemán
- Claudio: Ramón Iriarte
- Icilio: Blas Martínez
- Marcos: Alfredo Izquierdo
- Virginio: Danilo Van der Hahn
- Emilia: Yolanda Correa
- Chorus of the Escuela Nacional de Ópera
- Orquesta Sinfónica de Venezuela
- Conductor: Primo Casale
- Fundación Vicente Emilio Sojo, Número de catálogo: CD20101 // CD20102

=== Sources ===
- José Ángel Montero y su ópera Virginia (José Ángel Montero and his opera Virginia) (in Spanish), Felipe Sangiorgi. Analysis, synopsis and libretto.

== See also ==
- Venezuelan culture
