= Jessica Rivera =

American singer

Jessica Rivera (born 1974) is an American soprano of Peruvian-American ancestry.

== Life and career ==
Rivera is a 1996 graduate of Pepperdine University, and earned her Master of Music degree in 1998 from the University of Southern California's Flora L. Thornton School of Music. In the summer of 2001 she attended the Music Academy of the West summer conservatory program. Rivera's early work included singing in the chorus of Los Angeles Opera (LA Opera).

Rivera has become particularly known for her performances of the music of contemporary composers, such as John Adams and Osvaldo Golijov. At LA Opera, she sang the role of Anastasia in the 2003 world premiere of Deborah Drattell's opera Nicholas and Alexandra. Her Santa Fe Opera debut in 2005 was as Nuria in the revised edition of Golijov's Ainadamar. She sang on the subsequent Deutsche Grammophon recording of the opera.

Rivera has sung the European premiere of Kitty Oppenheimer in Doctor Atomic after Adams had rewritten and expanded the role from mezzo-soprano to soprano voice. She continued the role at Lyric Opera of Chicago, in 2007 and was the understudy for the 2008 production at the Metropolitan Opera. She has sung several parts and roles in John Adams' works, including the soprano part in El Niño, and the role of Kumudha in A Flowering Tree in the Peter Sellars production at the New Crowned Hope Festival in Vienna. In 2012 Rivera has sung the solo role in the world premiere of Gabriela Lena Frank's Holy Sisters with the San Francisco Girls Chorus and the Berkeley Symphony under the baton of Edwin Outwater. She is currently a professor of Voice at Miami University.
