= Kelley O'Connor =

American opera singer

Kelley O'Connor is an American singer. She earned her Bachelor of Music degree from Thornton School of Music at the University of Southern California and her master's degree in Music from the University of California, Los Angeles.

O'Connor has sung the music of several contemporary composers, including Osvaldo Golijov, Peter Lieberson and Steven Stucky. She sang the role of Federico García Lorca in the original version of Golijov's opera Ainadamar at the Tanglewood Festival in 2003, and subsequently in the revised version produced at Santa Fe Opera in 2005. O'Connor sang the role of García Lorca on the Deutsche Grammophon recording of Ainadamar, which won a Grammy award.
