= Ainadamar =

2003 opera by Osvaldo Golijov

- Opera by Osvaldo Golijov
- Translation: Fountain of Tears
- Librettist: David Henry Hwang
- Language: Spanish
- Based on: Federico García Lorca and Margarita Xirgu
- Premiere: August 10, 2003; Tanglewood

Ainadamar (from the Arabic عين الدمع 'Fountain of Tears' (Note: A natural spring near Granada)) is an "opera in three images" by Argentinian composer Osvaldo Golijov to a libretto by American playwright David Henry Hwang translated from English into Spanish by Golijov. In a series of flashbacks, it tells the story of the famous Spanish poet and playwright Federico García Lorca and his muse, the actress Margarita Xirgu, their opposition to the Falange, accusations of homosexuality against the playwright, and events leading to his execution by the Falange. Lorca is a breeches role sung by a mezzo-soprano. The opera was first performed at Tanglewood on 10 August 2003, substantially revised for a performance in Los Angeles on 29 February 2004 and adjusted further for its premiere at Santa Fe Opera on 30 July 2005, after which it was recorded.

== Background ==
Ainadamar has features of both an opera and a passion play, as it examines the powerful symbolic role Lorca has embodied after his death, especially among other artists. Lorca becomes a martyr in the name of freedom of artistic expression. The connections with the Baroque passion musical concept also occur structurally, as the work evolves as a series of arias, recurring choruses and dance genres. The symbolic aspect was emphasized visually by Peter Sellars in his staging for Santa Fe Opera.

Ainadamar also connects with previous operatic traditions, as in the casting of Lorca as a trouser role, in a manner parallel to other impetuous youths of opera, such as Cherubino (The Marriage of Figaro) or Octavian (Der Rosenkavalier). These characteristics have allowed Ainadamar to begin a successful performance run as a non-staged or semi-staged concert work.

== Plot ==
Xirgu prepares to go onstage at the Solís Theatre in Montevideo. She has spent her career portraying Mariana Pineda in Lorca's play of the same name. Xirgu fled to Uruguay in the unrest before the Spanish Civil War. Lorca refused to leave and was assassinated by the Falange in 1936. Like his muse Pineda, Lorca died young. Xirgu has been playing Pineda on stage for almost forty years.

Xirgu tells her student Nuria of her friendship with Lorca. The poet emerges from the past to sing of the pure love Pineda represented to him even as a child, when he would see her statue in Granada. Xirgu blames herself for Lorca's fate, since she could not convince the young man to abandon Spain. In Xirgu's memories, she dreams of freedom in Cuba, but Lorca insists that he must witness suffering and memorialize the dead. Falangist officer Ruiz Alonso arrests Lorca, accusing him of conspiracy. Lorca is taken to the Fountain of Tears alongside a teacher and a bullfighter. After the Falangist guard José Tripaldi takes their confessions, the three prisoners are shot.

In the present, an exhausted Xirgu insists she must tell Pineda's story one more time. A vision of Lorca interrupts her. He thanks her for immortalising his spirit on stage and in the hearts of her students as she dies.

== Performance history ==
It received its Chicago premiere at the Ravinia Festival on 14 June 2006, and was staged by Opera Boston in November 2007. Adelaide Festival under the artistic direction of Brett Sheehy presented a production directed by Graeme Murphy in March 2008 and Cincinnati Opera presented the opera on 9 and 11 July 2009.

Presentations in major conservatories have included the Indiana University Jacobs School of Music under Carmen Helena Téllez (2007), the Curtis Institute of Music under Corrado Rovaris (2008), and the University of Rochester Eastman School of Music under Octavio Cardenas (2025). A concert version was scheduled for Carnegie Hall with the Orchestra of St. Luke's in December 2008, with Upshaw and O'Connor. The opera was performed in 2010 at the Teatro Argentino in La Plata, with countertenor Franco Fagioli as Federico Garcia Lorca and Marisu Pavon as Margarita Xirgu.

Performances of the opera took place on June 25 and 27, 2011 at the Alhambra Nasrid palace in Granada during the 60th edition of International Music and Dance Festival of Granada. Granada was the cornerstone of Lorca's life and death. This consisted in a brand new production by the festivals of Granada, Santander and Oviedo under Luis de Tavira and conductor Corrado Rovaris. The Teatro Real in Madrid staged the Peter Sellars production in 2012, starring Nuria Espert and Jessica Rivera in the role of Xirgu and Kelley O'Connor in the role of Lorca. A production by Quantum Theatre in Pittsburgh, PA, with musical direction by Andres Cladera and stage direction by Karla Boos, opened in October 2012.

The opera had its first UK production in 2022, a production led by Scottish Opera, with performances in Edinburgh and Glasgow. In a review, Rowena Smith of the Guardian called Golijov's music "a celebration of the feminine" but criticized the "unnecessary imposition" of imagery relating to crucifixion. In 2023, the Detroit Opera included the opera in their 2022/2023 programming. Pacific Opera Victoria included Ainadamar in their 2023/2024 season. In the Metropolitan Opera’s 2024-2025 season, Ainadamar had its debut run from October 15th to November 9th. This was Golijov’s first time appearing at the Met.

== Roles ==
The performers listed are those on the 2006 Deutsche Grammophon recording.

Margarita Xirgu, an actress	soprano	Dawn Upshaw
Federico García Lorca	mezzo-soprano	Kelley O'Connor
Nuria, a favorite student of Margarita	soprano	Jessica Rivera
Ruiz Alonso, a Falangist officer	Flamenco vocalist	Jesús Montoya
José Tripaldi, a Falangist guard	baritone	Eduardo Chama
Maestro, a teacher	tenor	Sean Mayer
Torero, a bullfighter	tenor	Robb Asklof

== Recordings ==
- 2006: The first recording was released by Deutsche Grammophon on 9 May 2006. It immediately reached the top of the classical music Billboard charts. It was recorded by the artists for whom it was written, including Dawn Upshaw as Xirgu, Kelley O'Connor as Lorca, Jessica Rivera as Nuria, and conducted by Robert Spano with the Atlanta Symphony Orchestra and women of the Atlanta Symphony Orchestra Chorus. Both the recording and the opera met immediate critical acclaim. The recording won two Grammy Awards: Best Opera Recording of 2006, and Best Classical Contemporary Composition. Like much of Golijov's work, the opera heavily incorporates Arab and Jewish idioms, as well as Spanish flamenco sounds — in fact, there is a flamenco guitar section incorporated into the orchestra.
- 2024: Metropolitan Opera Orchestra and Chorus, conducted by Miguel Harth-Bedoya. Angel Blue as Margarita Xirgu, Elena Villalón as Nuria, Daniela Mack as Federico Garcia Lorca, Alfredo Tejada as Ramón Ruiz Alonso. Production: Deborah Colker. Recorded live, 22 October 2024, Metropolitan Opera House. Streaming audio, Met Opera on Demand.
