= Alfredo Rugeles =

American and Venezuelan composer and conductor (born 1949)

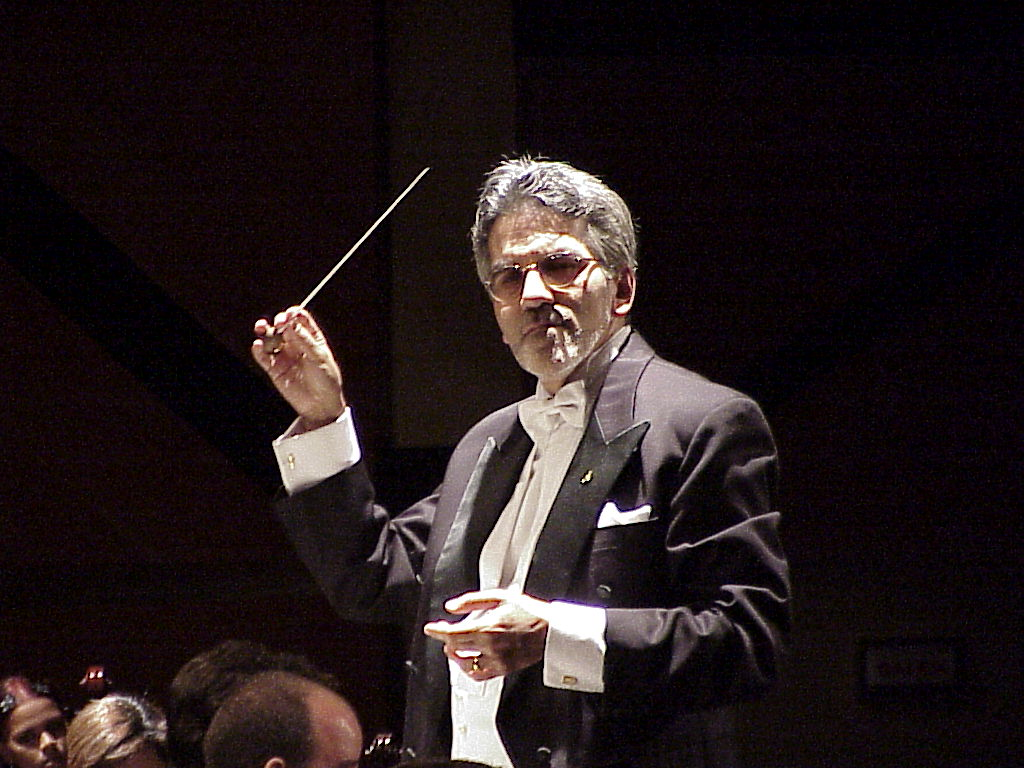
- Rugeles in 2012
- Born: Alfredo Rugeles Asuaje; December 13, 1949 (age 76); Washington, D.C., U.S.
- Citizenship: United States; Venezuela
- Education: Simón Bolívar University
- Occupations: Composer; conductor; orchestrator; teacher
- Years active: 1968–present

Alfredo Rugeles Asuaje (born 13 December 1949) is an American and Venezuelan composer and conductor. He is the artistic director of the Simón Bolívar Symphony Orchestra and has devoted much of his career to promoting contemporary Latin American music. Since 1991, he has been the artistic director of the Latin American Music Festival in Caracas.

== Career ==
Rugeles was born in Washington, D.C., where his parents were serving in the diplomatic corps. Between 1958 and 1976, he studied music theory and solfège, harmony, music history and aesthetics, piano, guitar, singing, choral conducting, and composition at the Juan Manuel Olivares School of Music in Caracas. During this period, his teachers included Adda Elena de Sauce, Juan Bautista Plaza, Luis Felipe Ramón y Rivera, Ángel Sauce, Eduardo Plaza, Gerty Haas, Guiomar Narváez, Mariela Valladares, Antonio Lauro, Flaminia de Sola, Carmen Teresa de Hurtado, Fedora Alemán, Alberto Grau, and Yannis Ioannidis, where he obtained in 1977, his degree as a performing singing teacher (Fedora Alemán Chair).

At the same time, from 1971 to 1972, he studied orchestral, choral and chamber conducting with professors Gonzalo Castellanos, Antonio Estévez, Abraham Abreu, Modesta Bor, Eric Colón and José Clemente Laya, among others. In 1976, he received a diploma in choral conducting from the Alberto Grau Chair at the Schola Cantorum Foundation in Caracas-CONAC.

From 1968 to 1976, he was deputy director, tenor and guitarist of La Schola Cantorum de Caracas.

Rugeles studied composition from 1970 to 1976, focusing on 20th-century composition techniques, with Greek-Venezuelan maestro Yannis Ioannidis at the Juan Manuel Olivares School of Music in Caracas. In 1975 and 1976, he attended the Latin American contemporary music courses held in Uruguay and Argentina for the first time as a participant, returning in 1982 as a teacher.

In 1976, he moved to Germany with a scholarship from the National Council for Culture (CONAC) and studied composition and live electronics with Günther Becker, conducting with Wolfgang Trommer, and piano with Christian de Bruyn at the Robert Schumann Institute in Düsseldorf, Germany (Staatliche Hochschule für Musik Rheinland), where he obtained diplomas in composition in 1979 and conducting in 1981.

In 1977 and 1978, he participated in international conducting courses taught by Sergiu Celibidache in Trier, Germany, and in the international conducting course with Michel Tabachnik in Hilversum, Holland, in 1979. He also participated in the conducting course with Franco Ferrara in Rome, Italy, in 1981. In 1978 and 1980, he was a member of the composition workshop during the summer courses of new music in Darmstadt, as a scholarship holder and conductor.

He was associate conductor of the Caracas Municipal Symphony Orchestra between 1982 and 1984. In 1984, he was appointed artistic director of the orchestra, a position he held until 1987.

From 1987 to 1990, he was musical director of the Teresa Carreño Theatre. Between 1987 and 1997, he was responsible for teaching contemporary composition, and until 2009 he held the chair of orchestral conducting techniques at the University Institute of Musical Studies (IUDEM).

In December 1990, he was appointed Director of the Simón Bolívar Latin American Symphony Circuit by the Inter-American Music Council (CIDEM) of the Organisation of American States. In this position, he is responsible for the organisation and artistic direction of the Latin American Music Festival. In November 1993, during the World Music Days held in Mexico, he was elected Member of the Executive Committee of the International Society for Contemporary Music (ISCM). In 1995, at the General Assembly in Essen, Germany, he was re-elected to his position.

In 1996, he participated as a guest professor invited by the Postgraduate Studies Commission of the Faculty of Humanities and Education of the Central University of Venezuela in the Master's Degree in Latin American Musicology with the course: Musical Thought in Latin America in the 20th Century. In July 2001, he won the position of Professor of Orchestral Conducting in the Master's Degree in Music at the Simón Bolívar University, where he teaches.

Since 1991, he has been the Artistic Director of the Simón Bolívar Symphony Orchestra.

== Catalogue of works ==
- Pequeña Suite for solo piano. 1972–73
- Mutaciones for Nonet or String Orchestra. 1974
- Polución for String Quartet, Viola, Cello and Piano. 1975
- La Guitarra For mixed a cappella choir, with poetry by Manuel Felipe Rugeles. 1976
- Canto a la Paz For mixed a cappella choir, with poetry by Manuel Felipe Rugeles. 1976
- Inventio for solo clarinet. 1976
- Inventio, version for solo cello. 1983–2003
- Puntos y Líneas for Instrumental Ensemble of 15 Soloists. 1977
- Thingsphonia Electroacoustic Music. 1978
- Somosnueve for Grupo de Cámara. 1978/79
- Camino entre lo sutil e inerrante for Orchestra. 1979
- El Ocaso del Héroe for Reciter, Mixed Choir and Chamber Orchestra, with poetry by Manuel Felipe Rugeles. 1982
- Tanguitis for solo piano. 1984
- Sinfonola for Chamber Orchestra. 1988
- Hace veinte años (Tribute to The Beatles). 1988
- Oración para clamar por los oprimidos. 1989
- Lady Aoi. Incidental electronic music composed for Yukio Mishima play. 1990
- Juglares del Video. 1991
- Hiroshima. 1993
- 27 de Febrero. 1993
- Judenatru. 1996
- Tanguitis. Version for flute and guitar. 1998
- Hablan las Estrellas. 2000
- Sal-Cita. For solo piano. 2003

== Awards and nominations ==
- 1979: National Composition Award for his work “Somosnueve“
- 1985: Municipal Music Award for his work “Taguitis“
- 2013: Chevalier des Arts et des Lettres Order from the French government.

== See also ==
- Music of Venezuela
- Classical music
- Simón Bolívar University
- Venezuela Symphony Orchestra
- List of Venezuelan Americans
