= Eric Owens (bass-baritone) =

American operatic bass-baritone (born 1970)

Eric Owens (born July 11, 1970) is an American operatic bass-baritone. He has performed both in new works and reinterpreted classic repertoire. In 1996 he won the Metropolitan Opera National Council Auditions.

== Life and career ==
Born in Philadelphia, Owens began studying the piano at the age of 6 at the Settlement Music School. In junior high school his interest shifted to the oboe and he began studying the oboe at the Settlement Music School with English-horn player Louis Rosenblatt of the Philadelphia Orchestra. He later continued his oboe studies with Laura Ahlbeck, a second oboe in the Metropolitan Opera orchestra, while attending Central High School in Philadelphia. During his senior year at Central High, he entered the pre-college program at Temple University's Boyer College of Music and Dance where he began studying singing seriously with George Massey. He matriculated to Temple as a Freshman in 1989 and earned a Bachelor of Music in Vocal Performance from the school in 1993. He then entered the graduate voice program at the Curtis Institute in Philadelphia where he became a pupil of voice teacher Armen Boyajian.

After graduating with a master's degree from Curtis, Owens joined the young artist program at the Houston Grand Opera where he made his debut as Ramfis in Aida. Since then his career has taken him to many of the most important opera houses in the world, including the San Francisco Opera (debut as Lodovico in Otello), the Royal Opera, Covent Garden (debut as Oroveso in Norma), the Los Angeles Opera (debut as Ferrando in Il Trovatore), and the Metropolitan Opera (debut as General Leslie Groves in Doctor Atomic). He has also sung parts in several world premieres, including creating the title roles of General Leslie Groves in the world premiere of John Adams' Doctor Atomic at the San Francisco Opera in 2005; Grendel in Elliot Goldenthal’s opera of the same name in the world premiere at the Los Angeles Opera in 2006; and later the same year as the Storyteller in the world premiere of Adams' A Flowering Tree at Peter Sellars’ New Crowned Hope Festival in Vienna. A Flowering Tree recorded with the London Symphony Orchestra on the Nonesuch label is available on CD.

In September 2010 Owens played Alberich in the Met's new production of Wagner’s Ring Cycle. He is featured in the CD "Great Strauss Scenes," released on July 27, 2010. Owens sang the role of Porgy in Gershwin's Porgy and Bess with Lyric Opera of Chicago in the 2014-2015 season.

== Awards ==
- 2012 Grammy Award: Best Opera Recording, for Deutsche Grammophon's Wagner: Der Ring des Nibelungen
- 2011 Grammy Award: Best Opera Recording, for Adams: Doctor Atomic
- 2003 Marian Anderson Award,
- First prize in the Plácido Domingo Operalia Competition
