= Ramón Iriarte =

Venezuelan-Canadian opera singer (born 1930)

Ramón Iriarte (born July 25, 1930, in Paris, France) is a Venezuelan-born Canadian baritone opera singer.

His father Segundo Iriarte was Venezuelan and his mother Felisa Estivalez was Basque-Spanish. Due to World War II and the political situation in France the life for children was not easy, his mother feared his younger brother was starting to get mentally ill from the constant air-raid sirens. In 1939, when Iriarte was nine his family emigrated to Venezuela seeking a better future and peace from WWII.

== Operatic training and career ==
Several years later, Iriarte started his singing lessons with Carmen Teresa Machado followed by Irene Eberstein as teachers. We also know that Mr. Primo Casale and Mme. Nina de Iwanek were in charge of his music repertoire. His career began in 1957 in La Escuela Nacional de Opera of Venezuela (preceding the creation in 1966 of the Instituto Nacional de Cultura y Bellas Artes – INCIBA). There, he sang roles in the operas Rigoletto, Un ballo in maschera, and many others. The big jump in his career happened two years later when he got the main role as Count Luna in Il trovatore, by Giuseppe Verdi. After a great performance and success many doors opened to him in the opera world. As Claudio in Montero's Virginia, and roles in L'amico Fritz, Carmen, Aida, Pagliacci, Madama Butterfly, and Bastien und Bastienne had become part of Iriarte's wide music repertoire full of success. One of the main places where Iriarte got to show his talent in a national way was in the Teatro Municipal de Caracas.

In 1967 was the first time he performed internationally in New York City where he gained fame and reputation. His baritone's life kept blooming as the years passed.

For over twenty–five years he dedicated his life to opera and proudly is part of the Venezuelan heritage. Singing international operas, he also was protagonist in the National Opera creations of the time like Caroline Lloyd's opera based on the novela Doña Bárbara 1967.

== Retirement from opera ==
Few years after, Iriarte decided to take time off from the opera scene and recorded some folkloric music and made few musical television shows. As the years went by, pursuing happiness with his family he became a bank manager to be able to spend and dedicate more time to them.

In the mid-1990s Ramon Iriarte left Venezuela with his family, wife and three children to live in Canada, where he occasionally sings.

== Recordings ==
- José Ángel Montero's opera Virginia, LPs (Caracas, 1969) Fondacion Vicente Emilio Sojo, National Opera Company, conducted Primo Casale
- L'amico Fritz LP with Alfredo Sadel as Fritz
