= Nico Castel =

American opera singer and diction coach

Nico Castel, in the 1970s

Nico Castel (born Naftali Chaim Castel Kalinhoff; August 1, 1931 – May 31, 2015) was a Portuguese-born comprimario tenor and language and diction coach, as well as a prolific translator of libretti and writer of books on singing diction. Although Castel performed throughout Europe, North America and South America, he was best known for his nearly 800 performances at The Metropolitan Opera in New York City, where he also served as staff diction coach for three decades.

Castel was raised in Venezuela by multilingual parents and a German nanny and attended a French school in Caracas. He moved to the US at the age of 16 to sing and study romance languages at Temple University. In the early 1950s, he served in the United States Army as a translator in Germany. In 1958 he made his debut in Verdi's Falstaff. In 1965, he sang the first of many roles with the New York City Opera. He made his Metropolitan Opera debut in 1970, where he continued to perform until 1997. He was its staff diction coach from 1979 to 2009. Castel had over 200 operatic roles in his repertoire, sang in opera houses in North and South America, Europe and Israel, and appears on various opera recordings.

On the concert stage, Castel often included Jewish music in his programs, and he served as a cantor at synagogues; he wrote a Ladino songbook. He also wrote A Singer’s Manual of Spanish Lyric Diction and translated a series of opera librettos, adding phonetic pronunciations that are used by singers and teachers throughout North America and Europe. He taught at The Juilliard School, Mannes School of Music, Boston University and other universities and conservatories around the world. He and his wife founded and operated the New York Opera Studio, which trained young singers, and he annually presented the Nico Castel International Master Singer Competition.

== Early life and career ==
Castel was born in Lisbon, Portugal, the "scion of a multigenerational dynasty of Sephardic rabbis" with roots in 15th century Castile. He was raised in Venezuela by multilingual parents and a German nanny and attended a French school in Caracas. After some vocal study in Caracas and then the University of Mainz in Germany, Castel moved to New York City at the age of 16 to pursue a singing career and to study romance languages at Temple University in Philadelphia. In the early 1950s, he served in the United States Army as a translator in Germany.

In 1958, he became the first winner of the "Joy in Singing" award, which launched his career with a recital at The Town Hall in New York City. He began calling himself "Nico Castel" early in his singing career. In June 1958 he made his debut with Santa Fe Opera as Fenton in Verdi's Falstaff. The following month he portrayed Joseph in the world premiere of Carlisle Floyd's Wuthering Heights in Santa Fe. In 1965, he first performed with the New York City Opera as Jacob Glock in The Flaming Angel and performing with that company in numerous roles thereafter. With the Metropolitan Opera in 1970, he debuted as Don Basilio in Mozart's The Marriage of Figaro.

== Opera and coaching career ==
Over the next 27 years at the Met, he gave nearly 800 performances and later served for three decades, until his retirement in 2009, as its staff diction coach. Castel had over 200 operatic roles in his repertoire. His singing career took him around the world to work with such companies as Palacio de Bellas Artes, Mexico City; Finnish National Opera, Helsinki; New Israeli Opera, Tel Aviv; Opera Metropolitana, Caracas; Teatro Nacional de São Carlos, Lisbon; Spoleto Festival, Spoleto, Italy; Maggio Musicale Fiorentino, Florence; Semper Oper, Dresden; and in the United States, the Opera Company of Philadelphia, Seattle Opera, San Francisco Opera, Chicago Lyric Opera, Ravinia Festival, San Antonio Grand Opera Festival, New Orleans Opera, Baltimore Opera, Miami Opera, Santa Fe Opera, Central City Opera, and St. Louis Opera, among others. On the concert stage, he often included Jewish music in his programs, and he served as a cantor at Scarsdale Synagogue in Westchester County, New York, and Progressive Synagogue in Brooklyn, New York. The New York Times commented: "Reviewers over the years praised Mr. Castel’s rich dramatic characterizations, his sensitive musicianship and, not surprisingly, his impeccable diction."

A polyglot, Castel spoke Portuguese, Ladino, German, French, Spanish, Italian and English with native or near-native fluency. He was an internationally known language and diction coach, writing the book A Singer’s Manual of Spanish Lyric Diction and translating an extensive annotated series of librettos of French, German and Italian operas, adding the pronunciation of every word in the operas' original languages using the International Phonetic Alphabet. These libretti "are used by singers, teachers and conservatories throughout North America and Europe." He was a member of the faculties of The Juilliard School of Music and Mannes School of Music in New York and Boston University, and was a lecturer, teacher and master class leader at other universities and conservatories around the world. His language and diction classes are taught at Juilliard, Eastman School of Music, Indiana University, New York University, Metropolitan Opera, New York City Opera, Chicago Opera, Pittsburgh Opera, the Opera NUOVA Vocal Intensive Program in Edmonton, Alberta, and American Institute of Musical Studies in Graz, Austria. He and his third wife, Carol Cates Castel, a voice teacher and stage director, taught on the faculty of the Spoleto Vocal Arts Symposium in Spoleto, Italy. They also founded and operated the New York Opera Studio, which trained young singers. Castel annually presented the Nico Castel International Master Singer Competition, which accepted competitors up to age 40.

Among Castel's recordings are Manon (with Beverly Sills, 1970) and The Tales of Hoffmann (with Sills and Norman Treigle, 1972), both conducted by Julius Rudel, and a live performance from the Metropolitan Opera of Ariadne auf Naxos (1988, with Jessye Norman, Tatiana Troyanos, and Kathleen Battle, conducted by James Levine; issued on DVD).

== Personal life ==
Castel's first wife was Carol Bayard and his second was Nancy Benfield. Both marriages ended in divorce. He died at the age of 83 in New York City, where he lived with his wife, Carol Cates Castel. He had one child (with his second wife), Sasha Castel, who lives in Canberra, Australia.

== Publications ==
- Complete Opera Libretti Translation Series, Marcie Stapp, ed. (Leyerle Publications, Geneseo, New York)
- The Nico Castel Ladino Song Book (Tara Publications, Cedarhust, New York)
- A Singer's Manual of Spanish Lyric Diction (Excalibur Press, New York)
