= Thomas G. Glenn =

Canadian opera singer

Thomas Grant Glenn is a Canadian opera singer.

== Education ==
Glenn grew up playing piano and singing, but turned to voice when he saw others were better at him at piano. He had been leaning toward a career in jazz until he was asked to sing Johann Sebastian Bach’s St. Matthew Passion by Douglas E. Bush, a professor at Brigham Young University.

Glenn holds a Bachelor of Music from Brigham Young University, a Master of Music Performance from University of Michigan with Doctoral Studies at Florida State University (all but dissertation). He is an alumnus of the Music Academy of the West summer conservatory.

== Professional career ==
Glenn has sung with:

- Atlanta Symphony
- Berkeley Symphony
- China National Symphony Orchestra
- The Cleveland Orchestra
- Colorado Symphony Orchestra
- The English National Opera
- Festival Opera
- The Lyric Opera of Chicago
- Marin Symphony, CA
- The Metropolitan Opera
- National Arts Centre Orchestra of Canada
- Netherlands Opera
- New Hampshire Symphony Orchestra
- San Francisco Opera
- San Francisco Symphony
- Santa Rosa Symphony
- Seattle Symphony
- West Edge Opera, Berkeley, CA

Glenn has received recognitions such as:

- Adler Fellowship at San Francisco Opera
- Concours International de Chant de Canari, France
- 2011 Grammy Award, Best Opera Recording as part of the ensemble cast of John Adams's Doctor Atomic (a 2005 recording of the Metropolitan Opera conducted by Alan Gilbert and released by Sony Classical)
- semifinalist in the Montserrat Caballé Competition

He has expressed a particular love for the works of Mozart.

While touring, Glenn uses "Skype ... to help the children with their homework and to be with my family for family prayer and family dinner."
