= Kristine Jepson =

American opera singer (1962–2017)

Background information
- Born: July 28, 1962
- Origin: Onawa, Iowa
- Died: April 21, 2017 (aged 54)
- Genres: Opera
- Occupation: Mezzo-soprano

Kristine Kay Jepson (28 July 1962 – 21 April 2017) was an American mezzo-soprano.

Jepson was one of four children born to Magnus Jepson and Dorothy Jepson, and the only daughter among the siblings. She grew up in Onawa, Iowa, and graduated from West Monona High School. She took her university degree in music at Morningside College, where her teachers included Harlan Buss. Jepson later studied music at Indiana University School of Music, with a focus on opera, and earned a Master of Arts degree.

Jepson made her role debut at New York City Opera in September 1998. At the Metropolitan Opera, she sang the role of Ascanio in the company's première production of Berlioz's Benvenuto Cellini. She sang in the first performance of Franz Liszt's oratorio St. Stanislaus in May 2003, with the Cincinnati May Festival.

Jepson premièred the role of Kitty Oppenheimer in the first performances of John Adams's Doctor Atomic at the San Francisco Opera in October 2005. Her other work in contemporary opera included performances in Jake Heggie's Dead Man Walking, as Sister Helen Prejean, at San Francisco Opera and at the Theater an der Wien.

Jepson died of cancer on 21 April 2017, age 54.

== Album appearances ==
- John Williams Trumpet Concerto Featuring Arturo Sandoval – A Long Way; Ronald Feldman, conductor (Denouement Records)
- Liszt: St. Stanislaus conducted by James Conlon
- A Night at the Opera conducted by Charles Rosekrans
- Bel Canto, with Renee Fleming; Patrick Summers, conductor (Decca)
- Berlioz: Benvenuto Cellini (live performance; James Levine, conductor)
