= Doctor Atomic =

Opera by John Adams

- Opera by John Adams
- Metropolitan Opera poster, 2008
- Librettist: Peter Sellars
- Language: English
- Premiere: 1 October 2005; San Francisco Opera

Doctor Atomic is an opera by the contemporary American composer John Adams, with a libretto by Peter Sellars. It premiered at the San Francisco Opera on October 1, 2005. The work focuses on how leading figures at Los Alamos dealt with the great stress and anxiety of preparing for the test of the first atomic bomb, the "Trinity" test.

In 2007, a documentary was made by Jon H. Else about the creation of the opera and collaboration between Adams and Sellars, titled Wonders Are Many.

== Composition history ==
The first act takes place about a month before the bomb is to be tested, and the second act is set in the early morning of July 16, 1945 (the day of the test). During the second act, time is shown slowing down for the characters and then snapping back to the clock. The opera ends in the final, prolonged moment before the bomb is detonated.

Although the original commission for the opera suggested that U.S. physicist J. Robert Oppenheimer, the "father of the atomic bomb", be fashioned as a 20th-century Doctor Faustus, Adams and Sellars deliberately worked to avoid this characterization. Alice Goodman worked for two years with Adams on the project before leaving. She objected to the characterization of Edward Teller, as dictated by the original commission.

The work centers on key players in the Manhattan Project, especially Robert Oppenheimer and General Leslie Groves. It also features Kitty Oppenheimer, Robert's wife. Sellars adapted the libretto from primary historical sources.

Doctor Atomic is similar in style to previous Adams operas Nixon in China and The Death of Klinghoffer, both of which explored the characters and personalities of figures who were involved in historical incidents, rather than a re-enactment of the events themselves.

=== Libretto ===
Sellars adapted much of the text for the opera from declassified U.S. government documents and communications among the scientists, government officials, and military personnel who were involved in the project. He also included poetry by Charles Baudelaire and Muriel Rukeyser, the Holy Sonnets of John Donne, quotes from the Bhagavad Gita, and a traditional Tewa native song.

==== Opening chorus ====
Marvin Cohen, professor of physics at UC Berkeley and president of the American Physical Society at the time, criticized some parts of the libretto for not being strictly scientifically correct. In particular he took issue with the original opening lines, which were excerpted from the 1945 Smyth Report:

"Matter can be neither created nor destroyed but only altered in form.
Energy can be neither created nor destroyed but only altered in form."

Following Cohen's criticism, Adams rewrote the opening chorus, which now reads:

We believed that
"Matter can be neither
created nor destroyed
but only altered in form."
We believed that
"Energy can be neither
created nor destroyed
but only altered in form."
But now we know that
energy may become matter,
and now we know that
matter may become energy
and thus be altered in form.

==== Conclusion of act 1 ====
The aria, sung by Oppenheimer, uses text from Donne's "Holy Sonnet XIV":

Batter my heart, three person'd God; For you
As yet but knock, breathe, knock, breathe, knock, breathe
Shine, and seek to mend;
Batter my heart, three person'd God;
That I may rise, and stand, o'erthrow me, and bend
Your force, to break, blow, break, blow, break, blow
burn and make me new.

I, like an usurpt town, to another due,
Labor to admit you, but Oh, to no end,
Reason your viceroy in me, me should defend,
But is captiv'd, and proves weak or untrue,
Yet dearly I love you, and would be lov'd fain,
But am betroth'd unto your enemy,
Divorce me, untie, or break that knot again,
Take me to you, imprison me, for I
Except you enthrall me, never shall be free,
Nor ever chaste, except you ravish me.

==== Act 2, scene 3 chorus ====
This was borrowed from the Bhagavad Gita (translated into English by Swami Prabhavananda and Christopher Isherwood) and reads:

At the sight of this, your Shape stupendous,
Full of mouths and eyes, feet, thighs and bellies,
Terrible with fangs, O master,
All the worlds are fear-struck, even just as I am.

When I see you, Vishnu, omnipresent,
Shouldering the sky, in hues of rainbow,
With your mouths agape and flame-eyes staring—
All my peace is gone; my heart is troubled.

==== Act 2, traditional Tewa song ====
This act is peppered with a repeated refrain from Pasqualita, the Oppenheimers' Tewa Native American housemaid. The text comes from a traditional Tewa song, and subsequent reiterations repeat the text with the direction changed to west, east, and south:

In the north the cloud-flower blossoms
And now the lightning flashes
And now the thunder clashes
And now the rain comes down! A-a-aha, a-a-aha, my little one.

== Performance history ==
=== Subsequent productions ===
In June 2007 this production made its European première at De Nederlandse Opera in Amsterdam. It then opened in December 2007 at the Lyric Opera of Chicago, again directed by Sellars, with Finley and Owens reprising their roles. Adams and Sellars made "some significant changes" to the opera and production in response to feedback from the San Francisco, Amsterdam, and Chicago productions.

A new production of the opera, directed by the film director Penny Woolcock and conducted by Alan Gilbert, was performed at the Metropolitan Opera in New York in October 2008 and was part of the Metropolitan Opera Live in HD series on November 8, 2008. The assistant conductor for this production was also Donato Cabrera. The HD video of the production was later televised nationally on PBS as well, in the Great Performances at the Met series in December 2008. On January 17, 2009, the Met production of the opera was heard on NPR as part of the Saturday afternoon Metropolitan Opera radio broadcasts. Penny Woolcock's production was restaged by the English National Opera in London, February 25 to March 20, 2009, with Gerald Finley reprising his portrayal of the lead. The 2008 Met production was streamed online without charge on June 23 and December 8, 2020. In July 2023 the opera was performed in an abandoned train warehouse in Utrecht as part of a science and music festival. The performance has the support of both the composer and the librettist.

== Roles ==
Roles, voice types, premiere cast
Role	Voice type	Premiere cast, October 1, 2005 Conductor: Donald Runnicles
J. Robert Oppenheimer	baritone	Gerald Finley
Kitty Oppenheimer	mezzo-soprano or soprano	Kristine Jepson
Gen. Leslie Groves	bass	Eric Owens
Edward Teller	dramatic baritone	Richard Paul Fink
Robert R. Wilson	tenor	Thomas G. Glenn
Frank Hubbard (Note: Hubbard's first name is also given as "Jack" in some sources.)	baritone	James Maddalena
Captain James Nolan	tenor	Jay Hunter Morris
Pasqualita	mezzo-soprano or contralto	Beth Clayton

Adams had written the role of Kitty Oppenheimer for the mezzo-soprano Lorraine Hunt Lieberson. However, she was unable to commit to the project due to her health (she died soon after the work premiered). The work was sung in the world premiere by mezzo Kristine Jepson. For the second major production, at De Nederlandse Opera, Adams reworked the role for a soprano, Jessica Rivera. For the Metropolitan Opera Premiere, the role was again sung by a mezzo, Sasha Cooke.

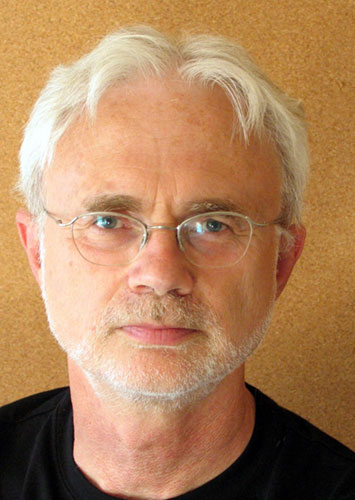
John Adams

== Doctor Atomic Symphony ==
In 2007, Adams adapted the opera into the Doctor Atomic Symphony. Music was taken from the overture, various interludes and orchestral settings were made of arias like Oppenheimer's signature "Batter My Heart". The work was first premiered by the BBC Symphony Orchestra and conducted by the composer on August 21, 2007, at a BBC Proms concert. Originally composed in four movements and lasting 45 minutes, the symphony was revised by Adams to just three movements (played without a break) and 25 minutes' length. This version was first premiered by St. Louis Symphony conducted by David Robertson at Carnegie Hall in February 16, 2008. It is recorded in 2008 by the St. Louis Symphony, conducted by David Robertson and released by Nonesuch Records on July 20, 2009. Adams has cited Sibelius's Seventh Symphony as a model for the ultimate form of the Doctor Atomic Symphony.

== Recordings ==
- 2008: DVD widescreen DTS sound; or Blu-ray widescreen Dolby True HD sound with Gerald Finley as J. Robert Oppenheimer; conductor: Lawrence Renes; Netherlands Philharmonic Orchestra and Chorus; Studio: Opus Arte
- 2008 HD video: Production by Penny Woolcock, conducted by Alan Gilbert, with Gerald Finley as J. Robert Oppenheimer, Sasha Cooke as Kitty Oppenheimer, Richard Paul Fink as Edward Teller, and Thomas Glenn as Robert Wilson. Recorded live on 8 November 2008 at the Metropolitan Opera House, New York City.
- 2012: Grammy Award for Best Opera Recording-winning audio recording with Gilbert, Finley, Cooke, Fink, Glenn, Metropolitan Opera, 2008 Sony
- 2018: Grammy Award for Best Opera Recording-nominated official audio recording with Gerald Finley, Julia Bullock, Jennifer Johnston, Brindley Sherratt, Andrew Staples, Marcus Farnsworth, Aubrey Allicock, BBC Singers, BBC Symphony Orchestra, John Adams, 2018 Nonesuch Records

== See also ==
- Copenhagen, a play by Michael Frayn about a 1941 meeting of Niels Bohr and Werner Heisenberg in Copenhagen
- Oppenheimer, film directed by Christopher Nolan and released in July 2023
