= A Flowering Tree =

Opera composed by John Adams

- Opera by John Adams
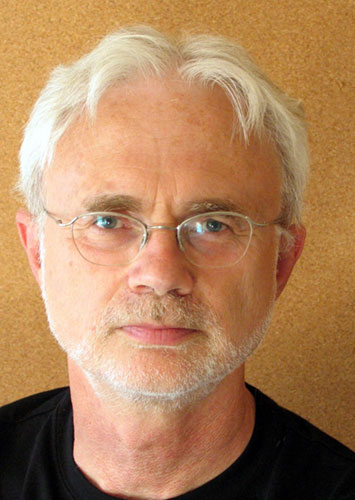
- Composer John Adams, 2008
- Librettist: John Adams; Peter Sellars
- Language: English
- Based on: Indian folk tale "A Flowering Tree: A Woman's Tale"
- Premiere: 14 November 2006; MuseumsQuartier Halle E, Vienna

A Flowering Tree is an opera in two acts composed by John Adams with a libretto by Adams and Peter Sellars, and commissioned by the New Crowned Hope Festival in Vienna, the San Francisco Symphony, the Barbican Centre in London, the Lincoln Center in New York City, and the Berliner Philharmoniker.

The story is based on an ancient Indian folk tale of the same title with translations by Attipat Krishnaswami Ramanujan. The opera resembles Mozart's The Magic Flute in some ways; both operas adapt folk tales, in this case one from southern India, "describing a young couple undergoing rituals and trials to discover the transfiguring power of love." This parallel was intended by the composer as the opera was commissioned to celebrate the 250th anniversary of Mozart's birth. It is set for a small cast of three singers (baritone for the narrator, tenor for the prince, and lyric soprano for Kumudha), a large chorus (SATB), and three dancers.

== Performance history ==
The opera premiered on 14 November 2006 in the MuseumsQuartier Halle E in Vienna with Eric Owens as the narrator, Russell Thomas as the prince, Jessica Rivera as Kumudha, Orquesta Joven Camerata de Venezuela and the Schola Cantorum de Venezuela all under the direction of John Adams in a production of Peter Sellars co-commissioned by New Crowned Hope.

In February 2015, James Darrah directed a new production of A Flowering Tree for Opera Omaha conducted by Christopher Rountree.

== Synopsis ==
Kumudha, a beautiful young woman who comes from an impoverished family, is worried about her old and suffering mother. Kumudha discovers that she has the magical ability to transform herself into a flowering tree. With the help of her sisters, Kumudha turns herself into a tree with the intent that her sisters gather and sell the flowers from her branches. Her sisters gather the flowers off the tree and Kumudha returns to her human form. They sell the flowers in the local marketplace and return to their mother who receives the money with no explanation from her daughters.

Kumudha and her sisters decide to once again sell flowers and she transforms into a tree yet again. The transformation is witnessed by a young Prince who is concealed in a nearby tree. He is at once infatuated and disturbed by Kumudha's magic and beauty. He resolves to marry Kumudha and upon returning to the palace convinces his father, the king, to order Kumudha to be brought to the palace so that he can marry her.

Following their wedding, the prince becomes silent and sullen and, to the distress of Kumudha, the couple spends several nights without speaking or touching each other. The silence is finally broken when the prince reveals he knows about Kumudha's magic and demands that she transform for him. Ashamed, Kumudha resists but eventually gives in.

Meanwhile, out of jealousy the prince's sister has spied on Kumudha and the prince witnessing her transformation. When the prince leaves the next day she taunts Kumudha and commands her to transform for her wealthy young friends. Reluctantly, Kumudha agrees. In the midst of the ritual however, the princess and her friends lose interest and leave. By breaking the magical ritual Kumudha is stuck in an in-between state where she is not entirely tree or entirely human.

Now a hideous creature, Kumudha crawls into a gutter, where she is found by a wandering band of minstrels.

Upon returning to the court, the prince discovers his wife is missing. When he does not find her, he assumes that his arrogance has driven her away. Feeling guilt and remorse, the prince decides to become a wandering beggar and mute in order to punish himself.

After several years pass, the prince stumbles into the palace courtyard of a distant city where his sister is now a queen. He is haggard and almost unrecognizable, but the Queen recognizes her brother and brings him into the palace where she bathes and feeds him. The prince, however, will not speak to her and is despondent.

In the town marketplace, several of the queen's maids see the minstrel troupe and hear the beautiful singing of a freakish thing with neither hands nor feet. They bring this strange and misshapen torso to the palace and suggest that its beautiful singing might revive the prince. Not knowing that this is Kumudha, the Queen orders her to be bathed and covered with scented oils and brought to the prince's bed.

Alone, Kumudha and the prince recognize one another. They are both overcome with grief and then with joy. He takes two pitchers of water and performs the old ceremony. Kumudha returns to her human form.

== Orchestration ==
The score calls for piccolo, two flutes, two oboes (one doubling English horn), two recorders (soprano and alto, doubling percussion), two clarinets, bass clarinet, two bassoons (one doubling contrabassoon), four horns, two trumpets, three trombones, timpani, two percussion, harp, celesta and strings.

== Recordings ==
- A Flowering Tree with the London Symphony Orchestra, the Schola Cantorum de Venezuela and conducted by the composer John Adams. Also with Eric Owens as the narrator, Russell Thomas as the prince, and Jessica Rivera as Kumudha. Recorded in 2007 and released in 2008 on Nonesuch Records.
