= Ana Rugeles =

Venezuelan composer (1914–2012)

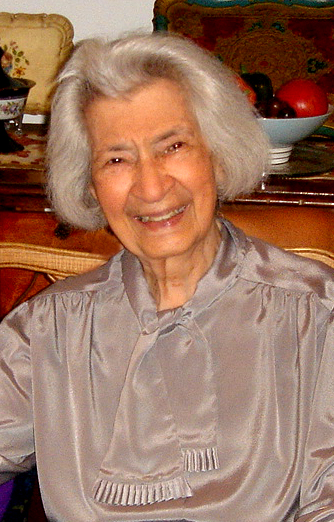
Image of Ana Mercedes

Ana Mercedes Asuaje de Rugeles (8 August 1914 – 21 April 2012) was a Venezuelan composer and music educator. She produced programs for the National Radio of Venezuela and was a founding member of the Little Mavare Orchestra, the Schola Cantorum de Venezuela and the Venezuelan Association of Authors and Composers.

== Career ==
Rugeles was born in Barquisimeto, Venezuela. She studied music at the Jose Angel Lamas Music School in Caracas; the Catholic University of America in Washington, D.C.; and in Buenos Aires, Geneva, Switzerland, and Paris. Her teachers included Jacobo Ficher, Franco Medina, Ascanio Negretti, and Vicente Emilio Sojo. She married Manuel Felipe Rugeles, a poet and Venezuelan diplomat, and they had a son, the conductor Alfredo Rugeles.

During the 1950s, Rugeles accompanied her husband to diplomatic postings in Argentina, the United States, and Venezuela. She was a teacher and the director of the Juan Olivares Music School from 1953 to 1975, and from 1953 to 1964 also produced radio programs for the National Radio of Venezuela. She was the academic director of the Simon Bolivar Venezuelan Youth Symphony Orchestra from 1978 to 1986.

== Awards ==
Rugeles’ awards included:

- 1946 Second Prize in the Venezuelan Romantic Style Song Contest, Ministry of Communications for the song “Plenitude”
- 1955 First Prize in the II Venezuelan Music Contest for the song “Woodpecker”
- 1993 National Council of Culture’s (CONAC) Musical Teaching Award.

Rugeles composed many songs based on texts by her husband Manuel Felipe Rugeles, as well as on texts by Alicia Alamo Bartolome and Regulo Burelli Rivas. Her music was included in anthologies, recorded by Discomoda, and published by the Schola Cantorum of Venezuela. Her works include:

== Chamber ==
- Serenata Barguisimenta (two woodwind quintets and piano)

== Piano ==
- Beatriz
- Maria Carolina
- Maria Celeste
- Pequena Suite Infantil

== Voice ==
- “Alma no me digas nada” (composed for soprano Fedora Aleman)
- La Tortuguita (for women’s choir; text by Manuel Felipe Rugeles; arranged by Irina Capriles)
- “Plenitude”
- “Woodpecker”
