= La Pasión según San Marcos =

Composition by Argentinian composer Osvaldo Golijov

St. Mark Passion
- Passion by Osvaldo Golijov
- Period: Contemporary classical music
- Composed: 2000
- Performed: 5 September 2000: Liederhalle, Stuttgart
- Published: 2006
- Publisher: Boosey & Hawkes
- Duration: 87 minutes
- Movements: 34
- Scoring: Orchestra, chorus, and soloists

La Pasión según San Marcos (St. Mark Passion) is a contemporary classical composition by Argentinian composer Osvaldo Golijov. It was finished in 2000 and is amongst Golijov's most well known compositions. It is famous for combining several Latin and African musical styles.

== Composition ==
The work was commissioned by Helmuth Rilling, from the Internationale Bachakademie Stuttgart in 1996 to commemorate the 250th anniversary of Johann Sebastian Bach. It was initially conceived to pay homage to Bach's St Matthew Passion, as part of a project called Passion 2000, in which Wolfgang Rihm, Sofia Gubaidulina, and Tan Dun also took part. All of the composers were asked to write their own version of the Passion, as long as they used the text.

At first, Golijov refused to take part in the project, because the Passion was meant to be a Christian composition, while Golijov himself was Jewish. Even though the composition was commissioned in 1996, Golijov didn’t start on it until two years later, while he studied the New Testament and the Catholic tradition. When Golijov presented the composition in rehearsals, Rilling himself asked him if "it was a Passion", for he was very surprised about the result.

The premiere took place in Stuttgart's Liederhalle on September 5, 2000. For that performance, María Guinand conducted the Orquesta La Pasión and the Schola Cantorum de Venezuela, Luciana Souza and Reynaldo Fernández had the role of Afro-Cuban vocalist, while Samia Ibrahim played the soprano. It was greeted with a 25-minute standing ovation. The US premiere took place in Symphony Hall, Boston, and had the same performers except for the Boston Symphony Orchestra under the baton of Robert Spano.

It was dedicated to María Guinand and the Schola Cantorum de Venezuela, and was published by Boosey & Hawkes in 2006.

== Structure ==
The composition is in two parts and takes approximately 87 minutes to perform. It is divided into 34 movements, even though movements 11 and 12 are blended together as one movement. The complete movement list is as follows:

- Part I
1. Visión: Bautismo en la cruz (Vision: Baptism on the Cross)
2. Danza del pescador pescado (Dance of the Ensnared Fisherman)
3. Primer anuncio (First Announcement)
4. Segundo anuncio (Second Announcement)
5. Tercer anuncio: En fiesta no (Third Announcement: Not on the Feast Day)
6. Dos días (Two Days)
7. Unción en Betania (The Anointment in Bethany)
8. ¿Por qué? (Why?)
9. Oración Lucumí (Aria con grillos) (Lukumi Prayer (Aria with Crickets))
10. El primer día (The First Day)
11. Judas
12. El cordero pascual (The Paschal Lamb)
13. Quisiera yo renegar (Aria de Judas) (I Wish to Forswear (Aria of Judas))
14. Eucaristía (The Eucharist)
15. Demos gracias al Señor (We Give Thanks to the Lord)
16. En el Monte de los Olivos (On the Mount of Olives)
17. Cara a cara (Face to Face)
18. En Getsemaní (In Gethsemane)
19. Agonía (Aria de Jesús) (Agony (Aria of Jesus))
20. Arresto (The Arrest)
21. Danza de la sábana blanca (Dance of the White Sheet)
- Part II
22. Ante Caifás (Before Caiaphas)
23. Soy yo (Confesión) (I am (Confession))
24. Escarnio y negación (Scorn and Denial)
25. Desgarro de la túnica (Tearing of the Garment)
26. Lúa descolorida (Aria de las lágrimas de Pedro) (Colorless Moon (Aria of Peter's Tears)
27. Amanecer: Ante Pilato (Morning: Before Pilate)
28. Silencio (Silence)
29. Sentencia (Sentence)
30. Comparsa al Gólgotha (Parade: To Golgotha)
31. Danza de la sábana púrpura – Manto sagrado (Dance of the Holy Purple Robe)
32. Crucifixión (Crucifixion)
33. Muerte (Death)
34. Kaddish

Like Bernstein's Mass, this composition is primarily meant to be performed on stage. It is scored for a choir of minimum 54 voices, out of which 8 must be soloists as well; a very large percussion section, which should consist of a berimbau, caxixi, bongos, guataca, okónkolo, maracas, congas, shekere, itótele, bombo legüero, bass drum, timpani, bell, guiro, gua gua, cuica, quinto, surdo cortador, surdo resposta, surdo marcaçao, repnique, chimes, wind chimes, tamtam, tambourine, sea shells, spring drum, iyà, and cymbal; the rest of the Orquesta La Pasión, consisting of a guitar, a tres, an accordion, a piano, a cajón, a contrabass, and sound effects; finally, a last section which should consist of two trumpets in C, two trombones, 12 violins, 12 cellos, and 4 basses. A dancer is also required for performance, especially in instrumental sections.

All movements are joined by an attacca, except for movements 2 to 3, and 26 to 27. The score also has frequent stage indications for performers and a guide on how the sound system should be set up. The texts are extracted from Mark's Gospel, the Kaddish, Lamentations of Jeremiah, Psalms 113–119, and texts by Galician author Rosalía de Castro.

== Critical reception ==
Even though the audience was shocked for the innovative character of the composition, it was very well received by public and critics, with a 25-minute standing ovation in the premiere. The New York Times and The Boston Globe called it "a work of genius". The latter also added that "the Pasión will stand as the first indisputably great composition of the 21st century." Alex Ross, from The New Yorker, said about the piece: "It drops like a bomb on the belief that classical music is an exclusively European art."

== Arrangements ==
- In 2010, Gonzalo Grau, 2011 recipient of the European Composers’ Prize of the city of Berlin and close friend of Golijov, composed an arrangement suite in six movements for two pianos and orchestra, entitled Nazareno. It was commissioned by Katia Labèque, Marielle Labèque and the Orchestre de Paris and sponsored by the Orquesta de Castilla y León.

== Recordings ==
Only two recordings of the Passion have been released to date:

- A 2001 recording by Hänssler performed by María Guinand, Orquesta La Pasión, and Schola Cantorum de Venezuela.
- A 2010 recording by Deutsche Grammophon, performed by Biella Da Costa, Jessica Rivera, Reynaldo González-Fernández, María Guinand, Orquesta La Pasión, and Schola Cantorum de Venezuela.
