= Lotty Ipinza =

- Born: Lotty Ipinza Rincón; 9 April 1953 (age 73); Valencia, Venezuela
- Occupations: Singer and author

Lotty Ipinza Rincón (born 9 April 1953, Valencia, Venezuela) is a poet and lyric singer.

== Career ==
She studied music at the Juan José Landaeta Music School (in Caracas), the National Conservatory of the National University (in Bogotá), the Tchaikovsky Conservatory (in Moscow) and the Santa Cecilia Conservatory (in Rome). In Paris, she frequented the Institute of Recherche and Coordination Acoustique/Musique IRCAM. She studied in a self-taught way Philosophy and Literature.

She inaugurated Teatro Teresa Carreño of Caracas with opera Aída, of Verdi. She has performed concerts and recitals in Europe and America. She has sung opera, oratorios, lieder, Latin American songs and contemporary music, especially from Kurt Weill. She directs her singing school with multidisciplinary and avant-garde concepts.

Her style has a soprano voice of dark color.

In 1990 she founded with the Venezuelan soprano Fedora Alemán in Caracas the Taller de Técnica Vocal Fedora Alemán, initially aimed at aspiring lyric singers, with limited economic resources and currently to stimulate the participation of those young people attracted by the singing of which is currently manager.

She has published aphorisms in the magazine Imagen, poetry in the Literary Paper of the newspaper El Nacional and participated in the First World Poetry Festival 2004 and in the VIII World Festival of Poetry 2011 in Caracas. She has also participated in poetic recitals.
