= Internationale Bachakademie Stuttgart =

German foundation

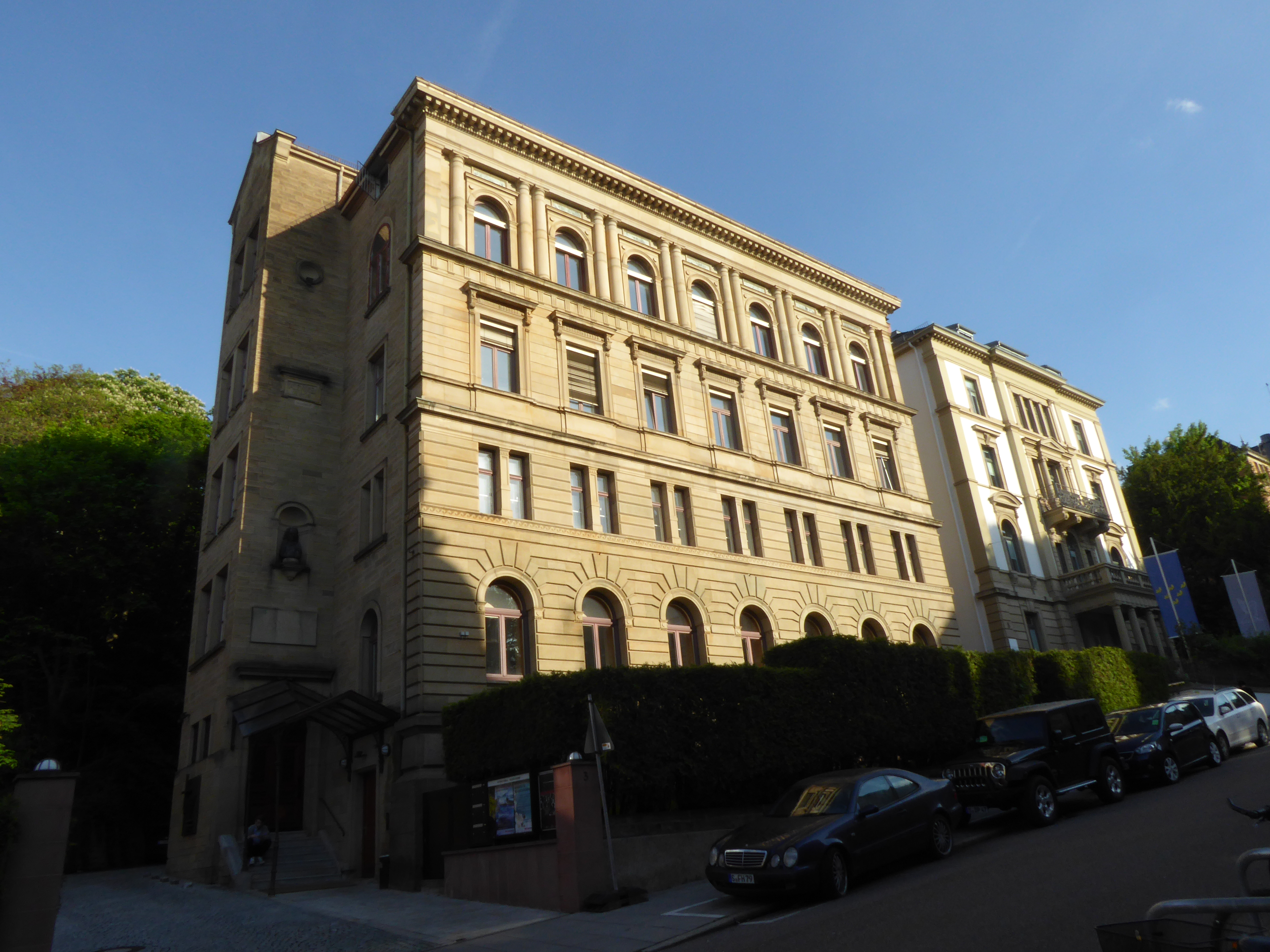
- Formation: 1981; 45 years ago
- Founder: Helmuth Rilling
- Founded at: Stuttgart
- Type: Foundation
- Key people: Helmuth Rilling; Hans-Christoph Rademann (from 2013)
- Affiliations: Gächinger Kantorei; Bach-Collegium Stuttgart
- Website: www.bachakademie.de

Internationale Bachakademie Stuttgart is a foundation in Stuttgart, founded by Helmuth Rilling in 1981 to foster international concerts and workshops, namely Musikfest Stuttgart, dedicated especially to the music of Johann Sebastian Bach in relation to present day composition. Its director has been Hans-Christoph Rademann from 1 June 2013.

== Musikfest Stuttgart ==
The foundation has organized several concert series including the annual "Musikfest Stuttgart" (until 2008 "Europäisches Musikfest Stuttgart").

== Ensembles ==
It has supported the ensembles Gächinger Kantorei, Bach-Collegium Stuttgart and the annual Festivalensemble Stuttgart and has conducted master classes and lecture recitals.

== International collaboration ==
Bachakademie Stuttgart has collaborated with the Oregon Bach Festival and other Bach Academies in Caracas, Buenos Aires, Tokyo, Osaka, Sendai, Budapest, Cluj-Napoca, Kraków, Krasnoyarsk, Moscow, Prague, Riga, Tallinn, Athens, and also with the Israel Philharmonic Orchestra.

In 1994 the Internationale Bachakademie Stuttgart received the "UNESCO Music Prize" of the International Music Council.

== Commissions ==
It has commissioned compositions such as the Requiem of Reconciliation in 1995, in 2000 works for the "Passion 2000" project by Sofia Gubaidulina (Johannes-Passion), Tan Dun (Water Passion After St. Matthew), Osvaldo Golijov (La Pasión según San Marcos - The Passion according to St. Mark), and Wolfgang Rihm, or in 2009 Messiah by Sven-David Sandström, premiered at the Oregon Bach Festival and also performed at the Rheingau Musik Festival and the Berliner Philharmonie.

== Recordings ==
In an "Edition Bachakademie“ all works of Bach were published for the Bach Year 2000 on 172 CDs in the Hänssler Classic label of Hänssler Verlag, then in 2010 for Rilling's 75th birthday as a Bach iPod.
