= Diction coach =

Teacher who trains performers

A diction coach or diction instructor is a professional specialized in teaching proper pronunciation and articulation of spoken language and sung lyrics. They focus on voice modulation, accent reduction, clarity, and effective verbal expression. The primary goal of a diction teacher is to enhance an individual's verbal communication, ensuring that their voice is clear, understandable, and suitable for specific contexts.

== Qualifications and roles ==
Diction teachers are typically qualified professionals with a background in linguistics, phonetics, and also acting or singing. They possess skills in understanding language structure and phonology, along with a solid knowledge of voice control techniques and breathing exercises.

The training of a diction teacher often includes specific courses on applied phonetics, prosody, and speech analysis. Many also have practical experience in drama, public speaking, or vocal performance, providing a practical and applied perspective.

== Role and responsibilities ==
Diction instructors help students overcome challenges related to pronunciation and language articulation. Lessons may range from specific pronunciation exercises to techniques for controlling breathing and vocal tone.

Additionally, diction teachers may work with students on other aspects of verbal communication, such as stress management, posture, and the appropriate use of language in specific contexts, such as singing, public presentations or job interviews.

The diction teacher plays a strong role in shaping and refining an individual's voice, contributing to more effective communication and confident verbal presence.

== Practical applications ==
Diction teachers are sought after in various contexts, including universities, drama and music schools, opera and theatre companies, corporate training institutes, and communication studios. They provide support to those looking to improve their voice and verbal communication to achieve greater effectiveness in their professional and personal lives.

== See also ==
- Dialect coach
- Acting coach
