= Manuel Felipe Rugeles =

Venezuelan politician and writer (1903–1959)

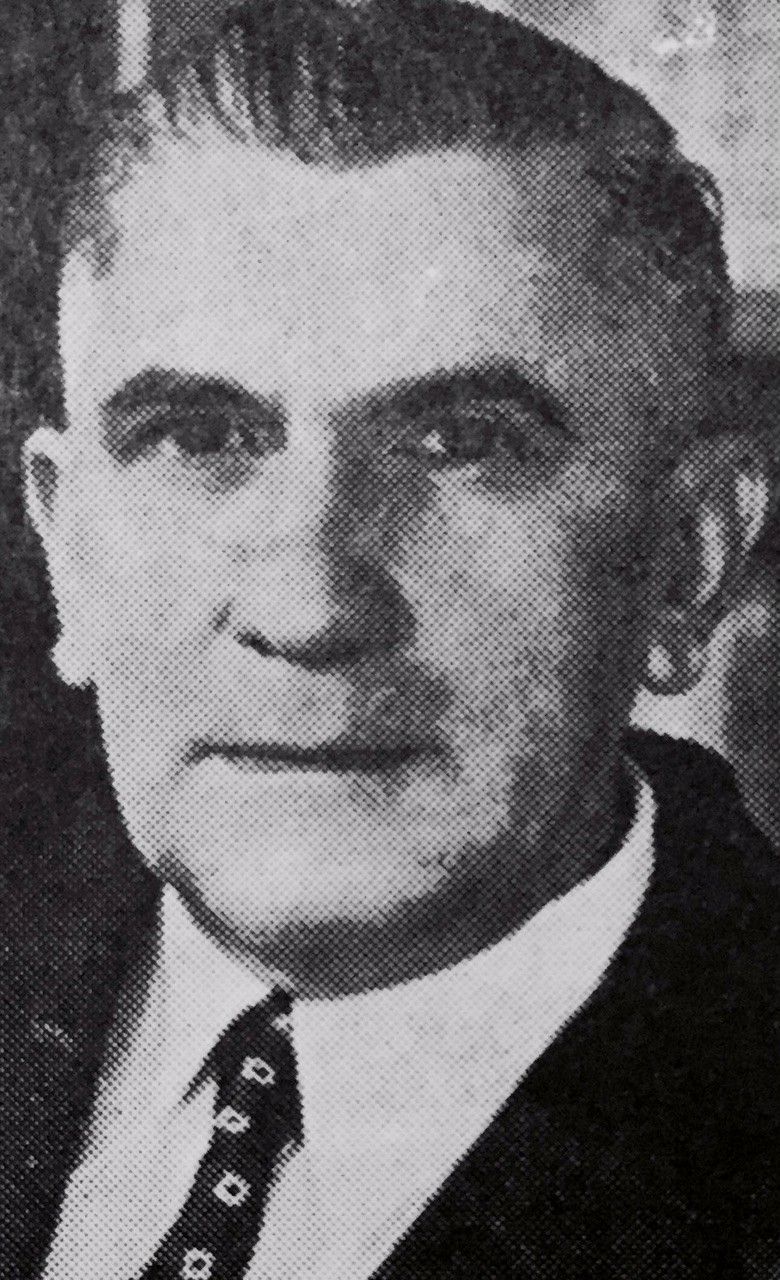
Manuel Felipe Rugeles

Manuel Felipe Rugeles was a poet, journalist and Venezuelan politician who was born in San Cristóbal, Venezuela in 1903 and died in Caracas in 1959

== Life and career ==
As a poet he belonged to the so-called Generation of 1918. As a result of criticisms made to the regime of General Juan Vicente Gomez, he was imprisoned in the castle San Carlos of Zulia and later exiled to Colombia in 1929.

In 1936, after the death of Gomez, Rugeles returned to Venezuela. He married the Venezuelan composer Ana Mercedes Asuaje de Rugeles and they had one son, the conductor Alfredo Rugeles.

Manuel Rugeles served as Secretary of the Venezuelan delegation before the Organization of American States (O.A.S.) in Washington (1948) and was cultural advisor of the Embassy of Venezuela in Buenos Aires. In 1953 he was director of Culture and Arts of the Ministry of Education and director of the National Magazine of Culture (1953–1957). During the last years of his life he founded and directed a children's magazine, Pico-Pico. His book of poems ¡Canta Piruelo! is consecrated as one of the best in Venezuelan children's literature. He won the National Prize for Literature in 1955.

== Bibliography ==
- Cántaro (1937)
- Oración para clamar por los oprimidos (1939)
- La errante melodía (1942)
- Aldea en la niebla (1944)
- Puerta de cielo (1945)
- Luz de tu presencia (1947)
- Canto an Iberoamérica (1947
- Copias (1947)
- ¡Canta pirulero! (1950)
- Cantos de sur y norte (1954), received the National Literature Prize
- Dorada estación (1961)

== See also ==
- Political prisoners in Venezuela
