= Primo Casale =

Venezuelan conductor, composer, and violinist

Primo Casale (1904 verrua po–1981 caracas) was an Italian-born Venezuelan conductor, composer, and violinist.

Casale was born in Lombardy, Italy. He was first a violinist at La Scala and participated in recitals for Radio Audizioni Italiane. He came to Venezuela in 1948 and became one of the foremost teachers of composition in the country at the Conservatorio Nacional de Música Juan José Landaeta. His students include composer Alfredo del Monaco, winner of the Tomás Luis de Victoria Ibero-American Prize, and the internationally active conductors Maria Guinand and Carmen Helena Téllez. He also developed in Venezuela an intense activity as conductor, a career that had begun in Milan with a chamber orchestra that he himself had founded and which traveled through Italy and Germany. Casale was a broadcaster and promoter of the opera in Venezuela. In 1949 he founded the choir of the Caracas opera. This group, which played for several years without any financial support, made its debut with Elisir d' Amore on May 29, 1950. In 1969, on initiative of Rhazés Hernández López, performed the opera Virginia by José Ángel Montero. Hernández López commissioned to Primo Casale the revision of the original manuscripts and its reorquestación, since some parts had gone astray. The direction of the orchestra was also in the hands of Casale. Despite his notable preference for the vocal genre, Casale also composed chamber and symphonic music. Among his most representative works:

- La Perla, for voice and piano
- La Domenica, for voice and piano.
- 1ª Sonata, for violin and piano.
- Il Canto del Creposcolo, for piano, celeste, violin I and II, viola, cello, contrabass;
- Cuentos del Abuelo, for a quintet of metals;
- Sonata in Do, for cello and piano.
- Tres Movimientos Corales, for four-voice choir;
- Motteto per 4 voci virili.
- Ninna Nanna, for orchestra.
- Cinque, for wood quintet ( National Composition Award, 1955).
- Sonata for violin and piano ( National Composition Prize, 1957).
- Sonata Concertante, for violin, viola, cello and piano (National Prize for Composition, 1964).
- Cuatro Invenciones, for orchestra.
