= Cayito Aponte =

Venezuelan humorist

Rafael José Aponte Álvarez
- Born: 22 April 1938; La Victoria, Aragua, Venezuela
- Died: 17 August 2018 (aged 80); Caracas, Venezuela
- Other name: Cayito Aponte
- Occupations: Humorist, actor, and singer.
- Years active: 1961 – 2018

Rafael José Aponte Álvarez; 22 April 1938 – 17 August 2018), better known as Cayito Aponte, was a Venezuelan humorist, opera singer, and actor. He was best known for his roles in films such as Operación chocolate (1984), Aventurera (1988), and 100 años de perdón (1998). He also appeared in television series such as Por todo lo alto (2006) and Piel salvaje (2016). He was a founding member of the comedy show Radio Rochela, where he stood out for his imitations of famous personalities.

== Biography ==
Aponte was born in La Victoria, Aragua, Venezuela on 22 April 1938. He started to make imitations of important personalities since he was seven years old. He was a founder member of the Orfeón de Arquitectura of the Central University of Venezuela.

He died on 17 August 2018 from cancer in Caracas, Venezuela; he was 80 years old.

== Career ==
He made one of his first appearances in a film called Abierto, noche y día in 1981. Some of his notable films, series, and soap operas include Operación chocolate (1984), Brigada central II: La guerra blanca (1992), 100 años de perdón (1998), and Nena, saludáme al Diego (2013). He was a participant of the television series called Radio Rochela, knowing that this was a comedy show. He was known for his imitations of celebrities and politicians, such as Carlos Andrés Pérez, Arturo Uslar Pietri, Cantinflas, and Renny Ottolina.
