= José Ángel Montero =

Background information
- Born: October 2, 1832; Caracas, Venezuela
- Died: August 24, 1881 (aged 48) Caracas, Venezuela
- Genres: Opera, zarzuela, waltzes, polkas, contradanzas
- Occupations: musician, opera composer

José Ángel Montero (born Caracas October 2, 1832 - died Caracas August 24, 1881) was a Venezuelan opera composer, a contemporary of the Brazilian Carlos Gomes. As maestro di capilla at the cathedral of Caracas he wrote religious music; he also composed a number of zarzuelas and, in 1873, the opera Virginia, to an Italian-language libretto.

== Works ==
- Doña Inés or la Política en el Hogar, 1862.
- La modista (zarzuela in two acts, 1864).
- Fabio o Estela or el casamiento por Dote, 1865.
- La curiosidad de las Mujeres or El Huésped enamorado, 1865.
- Los Alemanes en Italia, 1866.
- Colegialas con colegialas (zarzuela in two acts), 1868.
- La Castañera, 1868.
- El Charlatán Mudo, 1873.
- Diamira, 1873.
- Virginia, 1873.
- Tragedia Lírica, 1873.
- Atrás or el Centinela.
- Un baile en Caracas or el Cumpleaños de Leonor (zarzuela in one act), 1865.
- La ardilla (zarzuela in one act).
- La inocente Serranilla (zarzuela in one act).
- La gallina Ciega (Overture zarzuela)

== See also ==
- Venezuelan music
- Virginia
