= Fedora Alemán =

Venezuelan singer

Background information
- Born: 11 October 1912; Caracas, Federal District, Venezuela
- Died: 6 February 2018 (aged 105) Caracas, Venezuela
- Genres: Opera; Latin American folk and art song; Spanish art song; 20th century lyric recital
- Occupation: Singer (Lyric coloratura soprano)
- Years active: 1932-1989
- Label: RCA Victor

Fedora Alemán (11 October 1912 – 6 February 2018) was a Venezuelan operatic lyric coloratura soprano.

One of Venezuela's most celebrated singers, she performed in recitals touring in concert halls and made recordings throughout Latin America, the US, Middle East and Europe, performing traditional opera roles and Latin American folk and art song and Spanish art song.

== Early life, education and family ==
Alemán was born in Caracas, Venezuela and began to play the piano when she was six. Her vocal talents were recognized from an early age, especially when she reached her teens. She studied at the Escuela de Música y Declamación in Caracas before training in New York under Fausto Cleva and, in particular, Alfredo Hollander in Caracas.

In her early twenties, Alemán married the American cellist Mario Di Polo whom she met in New York when she was 22. They remained married until he died in 1975. The couple had three children: Reinaldo, a scientific researcher; Mario, a violinist, and Frank, a trumpeter.

== Career ==
Aleman sang her first opera in 1932 Pergolesi's intermezzo La serva padrona (The Maid Turned Mistress) and made her first recordings, on the RCA Victor label in New York while her first public performance was in 1936 at the Teatro Municipal of Caracas.

She went on to perform leading roles in Verdi's Rigoletto and La Traviata.

From 1950, her concert tours reached North America, Brazil and Europe. She performed in the United States, in Rio de Janeiro, and in 1951 in the Caribbean. In 1954, she participated in the Primar Festival de Música Latinoamericana de Caracas (First Caracas Festival of Latin American Music), with Bachianas Brasileñas by Heitor Villa-Lobos. In 1956, she sang Lucy from the opera of Gian Carlo Menotti: The Telephone, or L'Amour à trois. In 1961, she travelled to France and Italy where she undertook further voice training. The following year she performed at the Grand Théâtre in Bordeaux.

After appearances in Nice and Paris, she traveled in 1964 to Israel, where she appeared in Jerusalem and Tel Aviv. The following year, she sang the world premiere of Cuatro canciones sefardíes by Joaquín Rodrigo at the Ateneo de Madrid and in the auditorium of the Universidad Complutense de Madrid. In 1971, she received the first prize in the Certosa Festival in Italy. In 1974, she was elected Woman of the Year in Venezuela. In 1977 she received the National Music Award , and in 1992 the Andrés Bello award. The Simón Bolívar University called her "a pioneer of lyrical singing in Venezuela". She was a music teacher from 2006, with a doctorate honoris causa.

Celebrated Venezuelan and foreign composers have created works for Alemán. These include Por los caminos de Zorca y Petrea by Blanca Estrella de Méscoli, La renuncia by Antonio Estévez, Vuelas al fin by Moisés Moleiro, Canción a Fedora by José Reina, Giraluna lejana by Inocente Carreño, Alma no me digas nada by Ana Rugeles and Pájaro del agua by Joaquín Rodrigo.

After retiring from the stage in 1989, together with the Venezuelan soprano Lotty Ipinza, she founded the Taller de Técnica Vocal Fedora Alemán in Caracas, initially aimed at aspiring singers with limited resources and currently to stimulate the participation of young people attracted to singing.

Critic Ana Mercedes Asuaje de Rugeles (1914–2012) commented:

Today, the majesty of Fedora in her autumnal beauty is like a huge shrine safeguarding invaluable treasures, acquired during the irreversible course of a lifetime. Her presence shines out around her, whether singing or silent, she will always be Fedora, the unparalleled Fedora.

Fedora Alemán and her husband Mario di Polo were breeders of thoroughbred horses and owners of Stud Miami with racers such as Otelo, Marfé (composed with the name of Mario her husband and Fedora), Sicilia, Miss Val and also the champion El Griego. Mario Di Polo became a racehorse trainer since he applied in 1954 at the El Paraíso Racecourse and continued at the La Rinconada Hypodrome until his death in 1975.

Fedora Alemán died on February 6, 2018, of natural causes, in Caracas, Venezeaula at the age of 105.

== Recognition and awards ==
Alemán was named Mujer de Venezuela (Woman of Venezuela) in 1974. She has also received the Orden de la Ciudad de Caracas (Order of the City of Caracas), the Orden Andrés Bello and the Orden Río Branco. A music hall in the National Center for Social Action for Music of Caracas bears her name. The Fedora Alemán medal is awarded for lyrical excellence in the Venezuelan National Singing Contest.
