= Peter Sellars =

American theatre director (born 1957)

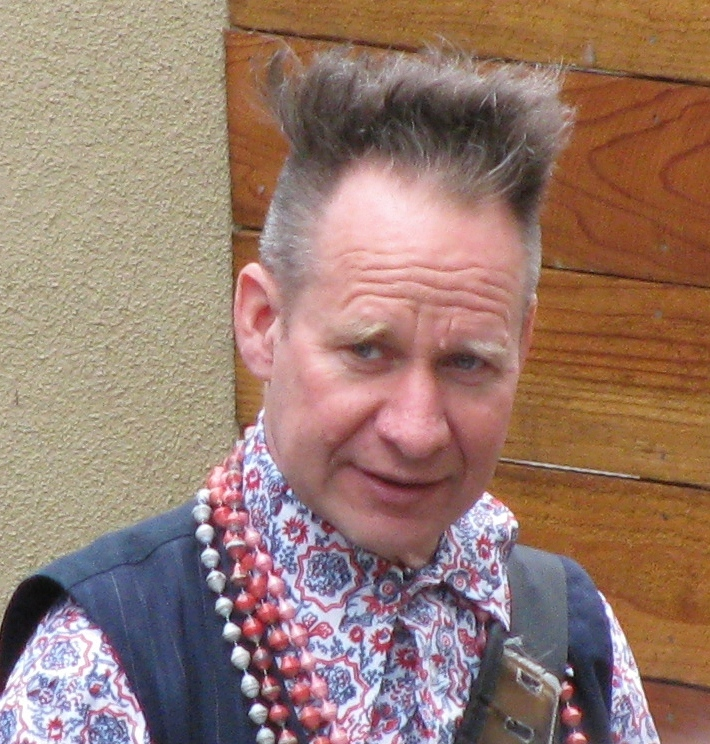
- Born: September 27, 1957 (age 69); Pittsburgh, Pennsylvania, US
- Education: Harvard University
- Occupations: Theatre director, professor

Peter Sellars (born September 27, 1957) is an American theatre director, noted for his unique stagings of classical and contemporary operas and plays. Sellars is a professor at the University of California, Los Angeles (UCLA), where he teaches Art as Social Action and Art as Moral Action. He has been described as a key figure of theatre and opera for the last 50 years.

== Biography ==
=== Early life ===
Sellars was born in Pittsburgh, Pennsylvania, United States, and attended Phillips Academy in Andover, Massachusetts. He attended Harvard University. Sellars's college productions included Shakespeare's Antony and Cleopatra in the swimming pool of Harvard's Adams House, a three-hour pastiche of Wagner's Ring Cycle incorporating live actors and various puppet characters, and a subsequent techno-industrial production of King Lear, which included a Lincoln Continental on stage with music by Robert Rutman's U.S. Steel Cello Ensemble. In his senior year, Sellars staged a production of Nikolai Gogol's The Inspector-General at the American Repertory Theatre in Cambridge. Sellars graduated from Harvard in 1980 with an A.B. magna cum laude and was elected to Phi Beta Kappa.

=== Career ===
In the summer of 1980, Sellars staged a production in New Hampshire of Don Giovanni, with the cast costumed and presented to resemble a blaxploitation film, as part of the Monadnock Music Festival in Manchester, New Hampshire. Opera News described it as "an act of artistic vandalism". In the winter of 1980, Sellars's production of George Frideric Handel's Orlando, again at the American Repertory Theatre, was set in outer space. Later, Sellars studied theatre and related arts in Japan, China, and India.

In 1981, Sellars worked on a project with Andy Warhol and Lewis Allen that would create a traveling stage show with a life-sized animatronic robot in the exact image of Warhol. The Andy Warhol Robot would then be able to read Warhol's diaries as a theatrical production. In 1963, Warhol had told an interviewer, "Everybody should be a machine". Sellars planned to show the Andy Warhol Robot at the Kennedy Center and American National Theater and Academy.

Sellars served as director of the Boston Shakespeare Company for the 1983–1984 season. His productions included Pericles, Prince of Tyre and a staging of The Lighthouse, with music by British composer Peter Maxwell Davies. In 1983 he received a MacArthur Fellowship.

Sellars was the original director of the 1983 Broadway musical My One and Only, a revival of the George & Ira Gershwin show Funny Face. However, Sellars and librettist Timothy Mayer clashed with the star, Tommy Tune, who eventually took over as the director. As Sellars told The New York Times, it was a struggle "between the forces of Brecht and the forces of The Pajama Game." In the same year, Sellars, alongside Elaine Spatz‑Rabinowitz, produced the performance installation Sudden Difficulties for the Institute of Contemporary Art, Boston. The same artists also collaborated on a production of Handel's Giulio Cesare in 1985.

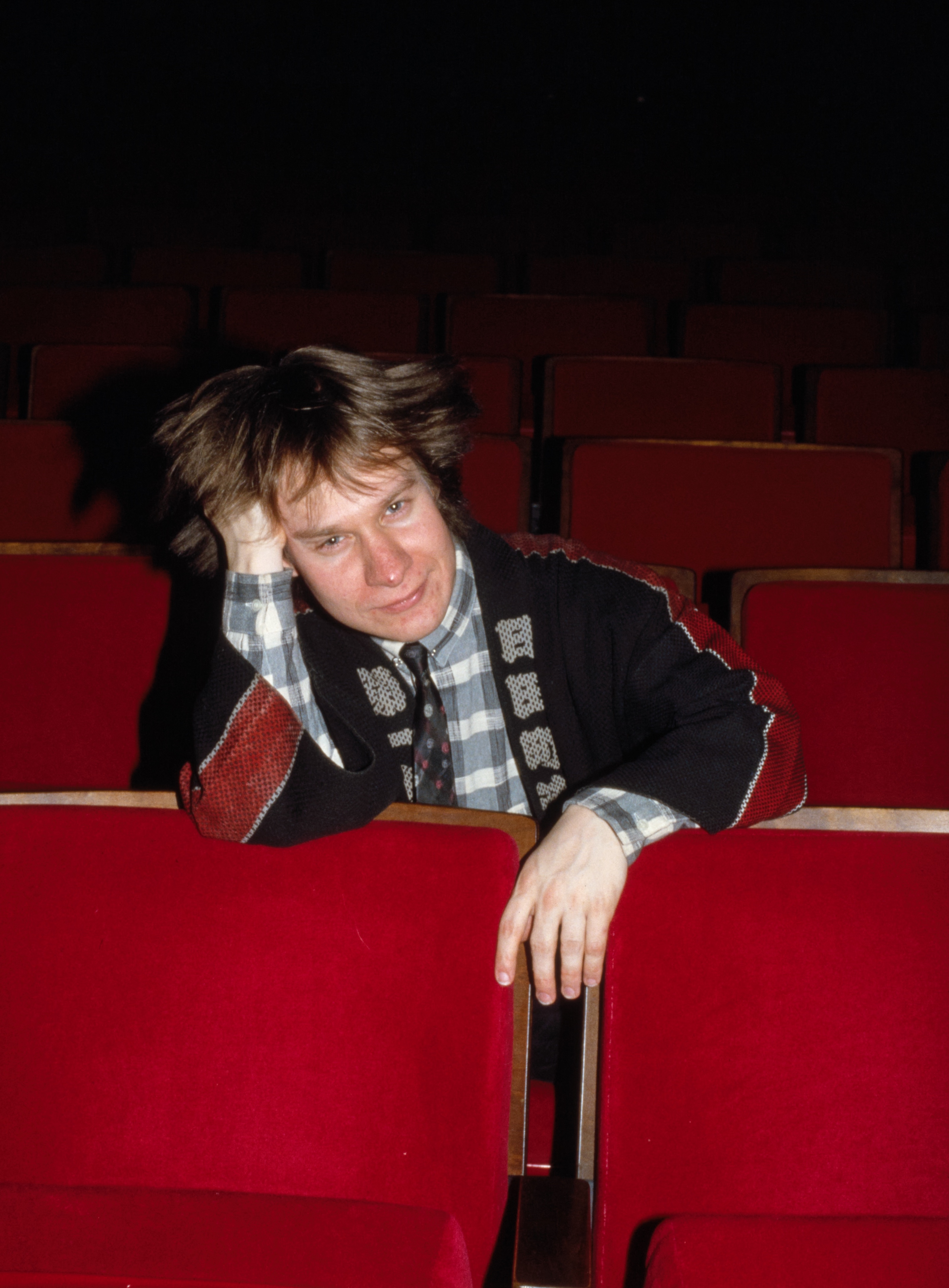
Peter Sellars in the mid-1980s

In 1984, Sellars was named director and manager of the American National Theater at the Kennedy Center in Washington, D.C., at the age of 26; he held this post until 1986. During his time in Washington, Sellars staged a production of The Count of Monte Cristo, in a version by James O'Neill, featuring Richard Thomas, Patti LuPone, and Zakes Mokae. The production had a set design by George Tsypin, with costumes by Dunya Ramicova, and lighting by James F. Ingalls. He also directed productions of Idiot's Delight by Robert Sherwood, and Sophocles's Ajax, as adapted by Robert Auletta.

Sellars was artistic director of the 1990 and 1993 Los Angeles Festivals. Sellars produced the three operas by Mozart with libretti by da Ponte, Così fan tutte (set in a diner on Cape Cod), The Marriage of Figaro (set in a luxury apartment in New York City's Trump Tower), and Don Giovanni (set in New York City's Spanish Harlem, cast and costumed as a blaxploitation movie), in collaboration with Emmanuel Music and its artistic director, Craig Smith. The productions were recorded in Austria by ORF in 1989, subsequently televised by PBS, and later revived at the MC93 Bobigny in Paris and the Gran Teatre del Liceu in Barcelona.

Sellars directed one feature film, The Cabinet of Dr. Ramirez, a silent color film starring Joan Cusack, Peter Gallagher, Ron Vawter, and Mikhail Baryshnikov. He apprenticed with Jean-Luc Godard and co-wrote Godard's 1987 film of the Shakespeare play King Lear, in which he also appeared as William Shakespeare Junior the Fifth.

The Salzburg and Glyndebourne Festivals invited Sellars to produce operas, including Olivier Messiaen's Saint François d'Assise, Paul Hindemith's Mathis der Maler, György Ligeti's Le Grand Macabre, John Adams's and Alice Goodman's Nixon in China and The Death of Klinghoffer, and Kaija Saariaho's L'amour de loin.

Sellars also staged Handel's opera Giulio Cesare and oratorio Theodora, and Stravinsky's A Soldier's Tale, with the Los Angeles Philharmonic conducted by Esa-Pekka Salonen, in addition to I Was Looking at the Ceiling and Then I Saw the Sky and The Peony Pavilion. He directed a production of The Persians at the Edinburgh Festival in 1993, which presented the play as a response to the Gulf War of 1990–91.

In the 1980s, Sellars appeared as an actor in two television series, Miami Vice (1985) as Dr. O’Hara, and The Equalizer in the 1988 episode "Last Call" as Woody, a hacker who helps Robert McCall gather intelligence.

=== Later career ===
Sellars was the librettist for the opera Doctor Atomic composed by John Adams.

In August 2006, he directed a staged performance of Wolfgang Amadeus Mozart's unfinished opera Zaide as part of the Mostly Mozart Festival at Lincoln Center in New York. In late 2006, Sellars organized the New Crowned Hope Festival in Vienna, Austria as artistic director (the festival was part of Vienna Mozart Year 2006). He directed the premieres of Kaija Saariaho's oratorio La Passion de Simone and Adams's opera A Flowering Tree, also in Vienna.

On April 29, 2007, Sellars delivered the "State of Cinema" address at the 50th San Francisco International Film Festival. He introduced the screenings of Mahamat-Saleh Haroun's Dry Season (Daratt) and Garin Nugroho's Opera Jawa, two of the New Crowned Hope films. The festival also screened Jon H. Else's documentary Wonders Are Many, which features an account of Adams's and Sellars's creation of the first San Francisco production of Doctor Atomic. An extensive commentary by Sellars is included in the 2007 DVD of Grigori Kozintsev's King Lear by Facets Video.

Preceding a performance of John Adams's Doctor Atomic at the Lyric Opera of Chicago, Sellars spoke of the horrors of was by decrying the bombing of Tokyo ("a city of wood and paper") by American forces, ignoring Imperial Japan's attack on Pearl Harbor, The Rape of Nanking, the conscription of Korean women as "comfort girls" for the Imperial armed forces, conducting the Bataan Death March, and the wanton execution of prisoners of war.

In early 2009, Sellars co-curated a contemporary art exhibition of work by Ethiopian artist Elias Simé at the Santa Monica Museum of Art, a kunsthalle in Santa Monica, California. His Othello, starring Philip Seymour Hoffman as Iago, was produced in the Fall 2009 season at New York City's Public Theater.

In 2011, Sellars directed a production of John Adams's opera Nixon in China for New York's Metropolitan Opera. In summer 2011 he directed the opera Griselda at the Santa Fe Opera in Santa Fe, New Mexico. Sellars wrote the libretto for Adams's opera Girls of the Golden West.

In the early 2010s, Sellars directed the staging of the Bach St. Matthew Passion and St. John Passion with the Berlin Philharmonic and Rundfunkchor, in collaboration with Sir Simon Rattle and Simon Halsey.

In 2019, Sellars gave the keynote address at the Salzburg Festival. It coincided with his staging of Mozart's Idomeneo, conducted by Teodor Currentzis. Sellars is a professor at the University of California Los Angeles. In 2021, Sellars donated his archive to the Getty Research Institute.

== Reception ==
Sellars was criticized for straying too far from composers' intentions in 1997 by György Ligeti.

In 1998, Sellars was awarded the Erasmus Prize for "combining in his original creations the European and American cultural traditions". In 2001, he was awarded the Harvard Arts Medal. In 2005, Sellars was awarded The Dorothy and Lillian Gish Prize, given annually to "a man or woman who has made an outstanding contribution to the beauty of the world and to mankind's enjoyment and understanding of life." In 2014, alongside Chuck Berry, Sellars was awarded the Polar Music Prize.

The German soprano Elisabeth Schwarzkopf said of Sellars, "I have seen what he has done, and it is criminal. As my husband used to say, so far no one has dared go into the Louvre Museum to spray graffiti on the Mona Lisa, but some opera directors are spraying graffiti over masterpieces."

Sellars's long-time collaborator John Adams has called him an "intensely serious and sophisticated artist with the moral zeal of an abolitionist."

The Palestinian-American academic, literary critic and political activist Edward Said described Sellars as an "extraordinarily gifted man". In a 1989 review of Sellars's productions of Don Giovanni, Così fan tutte and The Marriage of Figaro, Said wrote that the "turns that Sellars rings on Mozart's courtly operas make you wonder why wooden delicacy and affectations of authenticity have satisfied us for so long. We learn through Sellars that they never did satisfy us, not just because their silly conventions leave Mozart untouched but also because they protect the laziness and incompetence of most opera companies." In 1996, Said characterized Sellars's Covent Garden staging of Hindemith's Mathis der Maler as "compelling and brilliant in conception" and "deliberately uncompromising in its appeal to a late-twentieth-century audience".
