= Osvaldo Golijov =

Argentine composer (born 1960)

- Born: Osvaldo Noé Golijov; December 5, 1960 (age 65); La Plata, Argentina
- Education: Rubin Academy of Music; University of Pennsylvania (PhD)
- Occupation: Composer
- Spouse(s): Silvia Golijov (divorced); Neri Oxman (divorced); Leah Hager Cohen (m. 2023)
- Children: 3
- Awards: MacArthur Fellowship (2003)
- Website: osvaldogolijov.com

Osvaldo Noé Golijov (Spanish pronunciation: [ɡoli'xof]; born December 5, 1960) is an Argentine composer of classical music and music professor known for his vocal and orchestral work.

== Biography ==
Osvaldo Golijov was born and raised in La Plata, Argentina, to a Jewish family that immigrated to Argentina from Romania and USSR. His mother was a piano teacher, and his father was a physician. He studied piano in La Plata and studied composition with Gerardo Gandini.

In 1983, Golijov emigrated to Israel, where he studied with Mark Kopytman at the Rubin Academy of Music in Jerusalem. Three years later, he studied with George Crumb at the University of Pennsylvania, where he earned his Doctor of Philosophy degree. In 1991, Golijov joined the faculty of the College of the Holy Cross in Worcester, Massachusetts, where he was named Loyola Professor of Music in 2007. During the 2012-2013 concert season, he occupied the Richard and Barbara Debs Composer's Chair at Carnegie Hall.

As of 2016, Golijov lives in Brookline, Massachusetts.

Golijov is married to author Leah Hager Cohen. He was previously married to architect and designer Neri Oxman, and he has three children with his first wife, Silvia, who is a Special Education teacher.

== Music career ==
Golijov grew up listening to chamber music, Jewish liturgical and klezmer music, and the nuevo tango of Ástor Piazzolla. His Dreams and Prayers of Isaac the Blind was inspired by the writings and teachings of Rabbi Yitzhak Saggi Nehor.

In 1996, his work Oceana was premiered at the Oregon Bach Festival. He composed La Pasión según San Marcos for the Passion 2000 project in commemoration of the 250th anniversary of the death of Johann Sebastian Bach. In 2010, he composed Sidereus for a consortium of 35 American orchestras, to commemorate Galileo.

Golijov had a long working relationship with soprano Dawn Upshaw, who he called his muse. She premiered some of his works, often written specifically for her. These included Three Songs for Soprano and Orchestra and his popular opera, Ainadamar, which premiered at Tanglewood in 2003.

Starting in 2000, Golijov composed movie soundtracks for documentaries and other films, including The Man Who Cried, Youth Without Youth, Tetro and Twixt. He also composed and arranged chamber music, including for the Kronos Quartet (Nuevo) and the St. Lawrence String Quartet.

Golijov's song cycle "Falling Out of Time" was inspired by a novel by Israeli author David Grossman.

Golijov composed the soundtrack to Francis Ford Coppola's "Megalopolis" which he subsequently developed into a symphonic work premiered by the Chicago Symphony Orchestra on November 8, 2024. Coppola was present at the world premier of this work.

== Controversies ==
In 2010, the Los Angeles Philharmonic removed the premiere of a song cycle by Golijov from its recital series, after the work was not delivered on time. A violin concerto, commissioned by the orchestra, was not delivered after several missed deadlines between 2011 and 2013. And a commission by the Metropolitan Opera for the 2018-2019 season was cancelled in 2016. Golijov later revealed that he was suffering from depression during this period.

Tom Manoff, a composer and critic, and Brian McWhorter, a trumpeter, alleged that Golijov's Sidereus was largely copied from Michael Ward-Bergeman's composition Barbeich. Alex Ross of The New Yorker reviewed both scores and wrote, "To put it bluntly, 'Sidereus' is 'Barbeich' with additional material attached." Ross added that Ward-Bergeman knew of and did not object to Golijov's borrowings, having written, "Osvaldo and I came to an agreement regarding the use of 'Barbeich' for 'Sidereus.' The terms were clearly understood, and we were both happy to agree. Osvaldo and I have been friends and collaborators for years. I don’t have anything else to say about the matter." A consortium of 35 orchestras had paid Golijov $75,000, supplemented by a $50,000 grant from the League of American Orchestras, to write a 20-minute work. The work that Golijov produced was only 9 minutes long. Golijov had used that same musical material in his 2009 composition Radio.

Golijov responded to these questions by explaining that he composed the original musical material jointly with Ward-Bergeman for a film score which in the end did not include the material, and that he used it by agreement with Ward-Bergeman, who did not comment publicly on the matter. Golijov cited Monteverdi, Schubert and Mahler as other composers who used existing musical material to create new music.

== Notable compositions ==
=== Opera ===
- Ainadamar (2003), One act opera, libretto by David Henry Hwang

=== Orchestral & concertante works ===
- Last Round (1996) for string orchestra
- Tenebrae (2002) for string orchestra (also version for string quartet)
- Rose of the Winds (2007) for ensemble and orchestra
- Youth Without Youth Suite (2007/2011) for chamber orchestra
- ZZ's Dream (2008) for chamber orchestra (also version for piano)
- Sidereus (2010)
- Phoenix (2010)
- Megalopolis Suite (2024)

=== Concertante ===
- The Dreams and Prayers of Isaac the Blind (1994) for clarinet and string orchestra
- Azul (2006), Concerto for cello, obbligato group and orchestra
- Sign of the Leviathan (2015) for horn and string orchestra
- The Given Note (2024), Concerto for violin and chamber orchestra

=== Chamber music ===
- Yiddishbbuk (1992) for string quartet
- The Dreams and Prayers of Isaac the Blind (1994) for klezmer clarinet and string quartet
- Fish Tale (1998) for flute and guitar
- Mariel (1999) for cello and marimba (also version for cello and orchestra)
- Lullaby and Doina (2001) for flute or soprano, clarinet and string quartet
- Tekyah (2005) for chamber ensemble
- Air to Air (2006) for ensemble
- Radio (2009) for hyperaccordion, laptop and string quartet
- Qohelet (2011) for string quartet
- Um Dia Bom (2021) for string quartet
- Ever Yours (2022) for string nonet (also version for string quartet and string orchestra)
- Tintype (2024) for string quintet

=== Solo instrument ===
- Omaramor (1991) for solo cello
- Levante (2004) for piano
- Wasserfluth (2016) for piano
- The Last Moho Brachatus (2022) for solo cello

=== Vocal music ===
- There Is Wind and There Are Ashes in the Wind (1991) for clarinet, piano and narrator
- Sarajevo (1993) for voice and ensemble
- Oceana (1996), Cantata for soloists, chorus and orchestra
- La Pasión según San Marcos (St. Mark's Passion) (2000) for soloists, chorus and orchestra
- Tenebrae (2002) for soprano, clarinet and string quartet
- Three Songs for Soprano and Orchestra (2002) (also version for soprano and string orchestra)
- Ayre (2004) for soprano and chamber ensemble
- Drag Down the Sky (2016) for baritone and string quartet
- Falling Out of Time (2019) for three singers and amplified ensemble
- Laika (2024) for voice and chamber ensemble

=== Arrangements ===
- She Was Here (2008), an orchestration of four songs by Schubert
- Se Me Hizo Facil (2013) by Agustín Lara, arranged for string quartet
- Two Bagatelles (2016) by Beethoven, arranged for two violins

== Awards and recognition ==
Awards

- Guggenheim Fellowship (1995)
- MacArthur Fellowship (2003)
- Musical America Composer of the Year (2006)
- Grammy Awards x2 (2007): Ainadamar, Best Opera Recording and Best Classical Contemporary Composition
- Vilcek Prize in Music (2008)

Appointments

- Merkin Hall (New York), composer-in-residence (1998)
- Los Angeles Philharmonic Music Alive Series, composer-in-residence (2001)
- Ravinia Festival, composer-in-residence (2002)
- Spoleto Festival USA, composer-in-residence (2002, 2011)
- Ojai Music Festival, composer-in-residence (2006)
- Mostly Mozart Festival, composer-in-residence (2007)
- Chicago Symphony Orchestra, composer-in-residence (2007–2010)
- Holland Festival, composer-in-residence (2008)
- Carnegie Hall, Debs Composer Chair (2012–13)

== Selected discography ==
Film soundtracks

- The Man Who Cried soundtrack (Sony Classical/SME SK 61870)
- Youth Without Youth soundtrack (Deutsche Grammophon/Universal Classics, 2007)
- Tetro soundtrack (Deutsche Grammophon/Universal Classics, 2009)
- Twixt soundtrack
- Megalopolis soundtrack

Voice, chamber music and orchestral

- Yiddishbbuk (EMI Classics 7243 5 57356 2 1) – nominated for a 2003 Grammy for Best Chamber Music Performance
- Oceana (Deutsche Grammophon/Universal Classics, 2007)
- Ayre (Deutsche Grammophon/Universal Classics 477 5414)—nominated for a 2006 Grammy for Best Classical Contemporary Composition
- Ainadamar (Dawn Upshaw, Robert Spano, Atlanta Symphony Orchestra) (Deutsche Grammophon/Universal Classics)—won two 2007 Grammy Awards for recording and for composition
- La Pasión según San Marcos The Passion according to St. Mark (live & studio) (Deutsche Grammophon/Universal Classics 479 0346)
- The Dreams and Prayers of Isaac the Blind performed by the Kronos Quartet (Nonesuch/Elektra 79444)
- Voices of Light, Lúa Descolorida sung by soprano Dawn Upshaw (Nonesuch/Elektra 79812)
- Night Prayers, K'vakarat on recording of the Kronos Quartet (Nonesuch/Elektra 79346)
- Caravan arrangements for the Kronos Quartet (Nonesuch/Elektra 79490)
