= Grammy Award for Best Opera Recording =

Award for opera productions

- Awarded for: quality classical opera productions and recordings
- Country: United States
- Presented by: National Academy of Recording Arts and Sciences
- First award: 1961
- Currently held by: Esa-Pekka Salonen (conductor); Fleur Barron, Axelle Fanyo, Nicholas Phan & Christopher Purves (soloists); Jason O'Connell (producer) – Saariaho: Adriana Mater (2025)
- Website: grammy.com

The Grammy Award for Best Opera Recording has been awarded since the 3rd Annual Grammy Awards in 1961. The award was originally titled Best Classical Opera Production. The current title has been used since the 4th Annual Grammy Awards in 1962.

Prior to 1961 the awards for operatic and choral performances were combined in a single award for Best Classical Performance, Operatic or Choral. This award was given at the 1st Annual Grammy Awards and 2nd Annual Grammy Awards.

According to the list of nominees for the 2026 Grammy season, the award goes to the conductor, album producer(s) and principal soloists, and also to the composer and librettist (if applicable) of a world premiere opera recording only.

Years reflect the year in which the Grammy Awards were presented, for works released in the previous year.

Note: Performers and artists who did not receive a nomination and/or an award (such as orchestras, choruses, composers, librettists etc.) are listed between brackets.

== Recipients ==
Year^{[I]}	Recipient(s)	Work	Performing ensembles / orchestras / choirs (did not receive an award)	Nominees	Ref.
1961	Erich Leinsdorf (conductor), Birgit Nilsson, Giorgio Tozzi, Jussi Björling, Renata Tebaldi	Puccini: Turandot	Rome Opera Orchestra	Tullio Serafin – Verdi: La traviata (Rome Opera Chorus and Rome Opera Orchestra); Herbert von Karajan – Verdi: Aida (Vienna Philharmonic); Erich Leinsdorf – Verdi: Macbeth (Rome Opera Chorus and Rome Opera Orchestra); Tullio Serafin – Puccini: La bohème (L'Accademia di Santa Cecila Chorus and L'Accademia di Santa Cecilia Orchestra); Georges Prêtre – Poulenc-Cocteau: La Voix humaine (Paris Opéra-Comique Chorus and Theatre Orchestra of Paris); Josef Krips – Mozart: Don Giovanni (Vienna Philharmonic); Benjamin Britten – Britten: Peter Grimes (Royal Opera House Orchestra); Tullio Serafin – Boito: Mefistofele (L'Accademia di Santa Cecila Chorus and L'Accademia di Santa Cecilia Orchestra)	
1962	Gabriele Santini (conductor), Victoria de los Ángeles, Jussi Björling, Miriam Pirazzini, Mario Sereni	Puccini: Madama Butterfly	Rome Opera Orchestra	Antal Doráti – Wagner: The Flying Dutchman (Royal Opera House Orchestra); Karl Böhm – R. Strauss: Elektra (Dresden State Opera Chorus and Dresden State Opera Orchestra); Carlo Maria Giulini – Mozart: The Marriage of Figaro (Philharmonia Chorus and Philadelphia Orchestra); John Pritchard – Donizetti: Lucia Di Lammermoor (L'Accademia Di Santa Cecila Chorus and L'Accademia Di Santa Cecilia Orchestra)	
1963	Georg Solti (conductor), Robert Merrill, Leontyne Price, Giorgio Tozzi, Jon Vickers	Verdi: Aida	Rome Opera House Orchestra	Erich Leinsdorf – Wagner: Die Walkuere (London Symphony Orchestra); Georg Solti – R. Strauss: Salome (Vienna Philharmonic); Erich Leinsdorf – Puccini: La Boheme (Rome Opera Chorus and Rome Opera Orchestra); Pierre Dervaux – Bizet: The Pearl Fishers (Chorus of the Theatre National de LÓpera Comique and Orchestra of the Theatre National de LÓpera Comique); Otto Klemperer – Beethoven: Fidelio (Philharmonia Chorus and Philharmonia Orchestra)	
1964	Erich Leinsdorf (conductor), Rosalind Elias, Leontyne Price, Richard Tucker	Puccini: Madama Butterfly	RCA Italiana Opera Orchestra	Georg Solti – Wagner: Siegfried (Vienna Philharmonic); Herbert von Karajan – Puccini: Tosca (Vienna Philharmonic); André Cluytens – Mussorgsky: Boris Godounov (Sofia National Opera Chorus and Paris Conservatoire Orchestra); Eugen Jochum – Mozart: Cosi Fan Tutte (Rias Chamber Chorus and Berlin Philharmonic); Eugene Ormandy – Bartók: Bluebeard's Castle (Philadelphia Orchestra)	
1965	Herbert von Karajan (conductor) Franco Corelli, Mirella Freni, Robert Merrill, Leontyne Price	Bizet: Carmen	Vienna Philharmonic	Rudolf Kempe – Wagner: Lohengrin (Vienna State Opera Chorus and Vienna Philharmonic); Georg Solti – Verdi: Falstaff (RCA Italiana Opera Chorus and Orchestra); Rudolf Kempe – Smetana: The Bartered Bride (Bamberg Symphony); Thomas Schippers – Puccini: La Boheme (Orchestra of The Opera House-Rome and Chorus of the Opera House-Rome); Alexander Melik-Pachaev – Mussorgsky: Boris Godounov (Bolshoi Theatre Chorus and Bolshoi Theatre Orchestra)	
1966	Karl Böhm (conductor), Dietrich Fischer-Dieskau, Evelyn Lear, Fritz Wunderlich	Berg: Wozzeck	German Opera Orchestra and Chorus	Georg Solti – Wagner: Gotterdammerung (Vienna Philharmonic); Fausto Cleva – Verdi: Luisa Miller (RCA Italiana Opera Chorus and Orchestra); Thomas Schippers – Verdi: La Forza Del Destino (RCA Italiana Opera Chorus and Orchestra); Richard Bonynge – Bellini: Norma (London Symphony Chorus and London Symphony Orchestra)	
1967	Georg Solti (conductor), Régine Crespin, Hans Hotter, James King, Christa Ludwig, Birgit Nilsson	Wagner: Die Walküre	Vienna Philharmonic	Erich Leinsdorf – Wagner: Lohengrin (Boston Symphony Orchestra); Francesco Molinari-Pradelli – Puccini: Turandot (Rome Opera Chorus and Rome Opera Orchestra); Aaron Copland – Copland: The Tender Land (Choral Arts Society and New York Philharmonic); Istvan Kertesz – Bartók: Bluebeard's Castle (London Symphony Orchestra)	
1968	Thomas Z. Shepard (producer), Pierre Boulez (conductor), Walter Berry, Ingeborg Lasser, Isabel Strauss, Fritz Uhl	Berg: Wozzeck	Paris National Opera Orchestra and Chorus	Karl Böhm, conductor; Otto Gerdes & Hans Hirsch, producers – Wagner: Tristan and Isolde "Live" (Bayreuth Festival Chorus and Bayreuth Festival Orchestra); Herbert von Karajan, conductor; Otto Gerdes, producer – Wagner: Die Walkure (Berlin Philharmonic); Leonard Bernstein, conductor; Erik Smith, producer – Verdi: Falstaff (Vienna Philharmonic Chorus and Vienna Philharmonic); John Barbirolli, conductor; R. Kinloch Anderson, producer – Puccini: Madama Butterfly (Rome Opera Chorus and Rome Opera Orchestra); Francesco Molinari-Pradelli, conductor; Richard Mohr, producer – Puccini: La rondine (RCA Italiana Opera Chorus and Orchestra); Julius Rudel, conductor; Peter Dellheim, producer – Handel: Julius Caesar (New York City Opera Chorus Orchestra)	
1969	Richard Mohr (producer), Erich Leinsdorf (conductor), Ezio Flagello, Sherrill Milnes, Leontyne Price, Judith Raskin, George Shirley, Tatiana Troyanos	Mozart: Così fan tutte	New Philharmonia Orchestra	Herbert Von Karajan, conductor; Otto Gerdes, producer – Wagner: Das Rheingold (Berlin Philharmonic); Georg Solti, conductor; John Culshaw, producer – R. Strauss: Elektra (Vienna Philharmonic); Julius Rudel, conductor; Thomas Z. Shepard, producer – Ginastera: Bomarzo (Washington Opera Society); Karl Böhm, conductor; Hans Hirsch, producer – Berg: Lulu (Orchestra of the German Opera-Berlin)	
1970	Otto Gerdes (producer); Herbert von Karajan (conductor); Helga Dernesch, Gerhard Stolze, Jess Thomas	Wagner: Siegfried	Berlin Philharmonic	John Barbirolli, conductor; R. Kinloch Anderson, producer – Verdi: Otello (New Philharmonia Chorus and New Philharmonia Orchestra); Lorin Maazel, conductor; John Mordler, producer – Verdi: La Traviata (Deutsche Opera Berlin Chorus and Orchestra); Erich Leinsdorf, conductor; Richard Mohr, producer – Strauss: Salome (London Symphony Orchestra); Rudolf Kempe, conductor; R. Kinloch Anderson & Eberhard Geiler, producers – Strauss: Ariadne Auf Naxos (Dresden State Opera Orchestra); Karl Böhm, conductor; Gustav Rudolf Sellner, producer – Mozart: The Marriage of Figaro (Chorus and Orchestra of the German Opera); Raymond Leppard, conductor; Michael Bremner, producer – Cavalli: L'Ormindo (Glyndebourne Festival Opera Chorus)	
1971	Erik Smith (producer); Colin Davis (conductor)	Berlioz: Les Troyens	Royal Opera House Orchestra and Chorus	Herbert von Karajan, conductor; Otto Gerdes, producer – Wagner: Götterdämmerung (Deutsch Opera Chorus and Berlin Philharmonic); Zubin Mehta, conductor; Richard Mohr, producer – Verdi: Il trovatore (Ambrosian Opera Chorus and New Philharmonia Orchestra); Georg Solti, conductor; Christopher Raeburn, producer – R. Strauss: Der Rosenkavalier (Vienna Philharmonic); Pierre Boulez, conductor; Paul Myers, producer – Debussy: Pelléas et Mélisande (Royal Opera House Chorus and Orchestra)	
1972	Richard Mohr (producer); Erich Leinsdorf (conductor); Grace Bumbry, Plácido Domingo, Sherrill Milnes, Leontyne Price, Ruggero Raimondi	Verdi: Aida	John Aldis Choir and London Symphony Orchestra	Pierre Boulez, conductor; Hans Hirsch, producer – Wagner: Parsifal (Bayreuth Festival Chorus and Orchestra); Herbert von Karajan, conductor; R. Kinloch Anderson & Diether Gerhardt Worm, producers – Wagner: Die Meistersinger Von Nurnberg (Dresden State Opera Chorus, Leipzig Radio Chorus and Dresden State Opera Orchestra); Carlo Maria Giulini, conductor; Christopher Bishop, producer – Verdi: Don Carlo (Ambrosian Opera Chorus and Royal Opera House Orchestra – Covent Garden); Colin Davis, conductor; Erik Smith, producer – Tippett: The Midsummer Marriage (Royal Opera House Orchestra – Covent Garden); Erich Leinsdorf, conductor; Richard Mohr, producer – Puccini: Il Tabarro (John Choir Alldis and New Philharmonia Orchestra); Georg Solti, conductor; Christopher Raeburn, producer – Mozart: The Magic Flute (Vienna Philharmonic); Julius Rudel, conductor; Michael Williamson, producer – Massenet: Manon (Ambrosian Opera Chorus and New Philharmonia Orchestra)	
1973	Erik Smith (producer); Colin Davis (conductor)	Berlioz: Benvenuto Cellini	BBC Symphony Orchestra	Wilhelm Furtwängler, conductor; J. D. Bicknell & Radiotelevisione Italiana, producers – Wagner: The Ring of the Nibelung (RAI Chorus and Rome Symphony Orchestra); Georg Solti, conductor; Raymond Minshull, producer – Wagner: Tannhauser (Vienna Philharmonic); Leonard Bernstein, conductor; John Culshaw, producer – Strauss: Der Rosenkavalier (Vienna State Opera Chorus and Vienna Philharmonic); Herbert von Karajan, conductor; Raymond Minshull, producer – Mussorgsky: Boris Godunov (Vienna Boys Choir, Vienna State Opera Chorus and Vienna Philharmonic); Benjamin Britten, conductor; David Harvey, producer – Britten: Owen Wingrave (English Chamber Orchestra)	
1974	Tom Mowrey (producer); Leonard Bernstein (conductor), Marilyn Horne, Tom Krause, Adriana Maliponte, James McCracken	Bizet: Carmen	Metropolitan Opera Orchestra and Chorus	Herbert von Karajan, conductor; Michel Glotz, producer – Wagner: Tristan Und Isolde (Berlin Philharmonic); Georg Solti, conductor; Raymond Minshull, producer – Wagner: Parsifal (Vienna Boys Choir & Vienna State Opera Chorus and Vienna Philharmonic); Karl Böhm, conductor; Wolfgang Lohse, producer – Wagner: Der Ring Des Nibelungen (Bayreuth Festival Orchestra); Zubin Mehta, conductor; Raymond Minshull, producer – Puccini: Turandot (John Choir Alldis & Wandsworth School Choir and London Philharmonic); Meredith Davies, conductor; Christopher Bishop, producer – Delius: A Village Romeo and Juliet (John Choir Alldis and Royal Philharmonic Orchestra)	
1975	Richard Mohr (producer); Georg Solti (conductor), Judith Blegen, Montserrat Caballé, Plácido Domingo, Sherrill Milnes, Ruggero Raimondi	Puccini: La bohème	London Philharmonic Orchestra	Carlos Kleiber, conductor; Ellen Hickmann, producer – Weber: Der Freischutz (Leipzig Radio Chorus; Dresden State Orchestra); James Levine, conductor; Richard Mohr, producer – Verdi: I Vespri Siciliani (John Choir Alldis and New Philharmonia Orchestra); Rafael Kubelík, conductor; Rudolph Werner, producer – Pfitzner: Palestrina (Bavarian Radio Chorus and Bavarian Radio Orchestra); Colin Davis, conductor; Erik Smith, producer – Mozart: Don Giovanni (Royal Opera House Chorus and Orchestra of Covent Garden); Georg Solti, conductor; Christopher Raeburn, producer – Mozart: Cosi Fan Tutte (London Philharmonic); Kurt Eichhorn, conductor; Fritz Ganss & Theodor Holzinger, producers – Humperdinck: Hansel and Gretel (Bavarian Radio Orchestra)	
1976	Erik Smith (producer); Colin Davis (conductor), Richard Van Allan, Janet Baker, Montserrat Caballé, Ileana Cotrubaș, Wladimiro Ganzarolli, Nicolai Gedda	Mozart: Così fan tutte	Royal Opera House Orchestra	Meredith Davies, conductor; Christopher Bishop, producer – Vaughan Williams: Sir John in Love (John Choir Alldis and New Philharmonia Orchestra); Michael Gielen, conductor; Abkauf von Orf, producer – Schoenberg: Moses Und Aron (Austrian Radio Chorus and Austrian Radio Orchestra); Thomas Schippers, conductor; John Mordler, producer – Rossini: The Siege of Corinth (Ambrosian Opera Chorus and London Symphony Orchestra); James Levine, conductor; Christopher Bishop, producer – Rossini: The Barber of Seville (John Choir Alldis and London Symphony Orchestra); Erich Leinsdorf, conductor; Charles Gerhardt, producer – Korngold: Die Tote Stadt (Bavarian Radio Chorus and Munich Radio Orchestra); Antal Doráti, conductor; James Mallinson, producer – Dallapiccola; Il Prigioniero (University of Maryland Chorus and Washington D.C. National Symphony Orchestra)	
1977	Michael Woolcock (producer); Lorin Maazel (conductor), Leona Mitchell, Willard White	Gershwin: Porgy and Bess	Cleveland Orchestra	Claudio Abbado, conductor; Rainer Brock, producer – Verdi: Macbeth (La Scala Opera Chorus and La Scala Opera Orchestra); Pierre Boulez, conductor; Paul Myers, producer – Schoenberg: Moses Und Aaron (BBC Symphony Singers & Orpheus Boys Choir and BBC Symphony Orchestra); Lorin Maazel, conductor; Christopher Bishop, producer – Massenet: Thais (John Choir Alldis and New Philharmonia Orchestra); Gunther Schuller, conductor; Tom Mowrey, producer – Joplin: Treemonisha (Original Cast Chorus and Orchestra); Georg Solti, conductor; Christopher Raeburn, producer – Bizet: Carmen (London Philharmonic)	
1978	Thomas Z. Shepard (producer); John DeMain (conductor), Donnie Ray Albert, Carol Brice, Clamma Dale	Gershwin: Porgy and Bess	Houston Grand Opera Orchestra	Stanley Silverman, conductor; Larry Morton, producer – Weill: Three Penny Opera (New York Shakespeare Festival Orchestra); Georg Solti, conductor; Raymond Minshull, producer – Wagner: The Flying Dutchman (Chicago Symphony Chorus and Chicago Symphony Orchestra); Eugen Jochum, conductor; Gunther Breest, producer – Wagner: Die Meistersinger Von Nurnberg (Deutsche Oper Berlin Chorus and Orchestra); Colin Davis, conductor; Erik Smith, producer – Puccini: Tosca (Royal Opera House Chorus and Orchestra of Covent Garden); Jerzy Semkow, conductor; David Mottley, producer – Mussorgsky: Boris Godunov (Polish National Radio Symphony Chorus and Polish National Radio Symphony Orchestra); Charles Mackerras, conductor; James Mallinson, producer – Janácek: Katya Kabanova (Vienna Philharmonic); Antal Doráti, conductor; Erik Smith, producer – Haydn: Orlando Paladino (Orchestre de Chambre de Lausanne)	
1979	George Sponhaltz, John Coveney (producers); Julius Rudel (conductor), Beverly Sills, Alan Titus	Lehár: The Merry Widow	New York City Opera Orchestra	Carlos Kleiber, conductor; Hans Hirsch, producer – Verdi: La Traviata (Bavarian State Opera Chorus and Orchestra); Gennady Rozhdestvensky, conductor; Severin Pazukhin, producer – Shostakovich: The Nose (Moscow Chamber Opera Chorus and Orchestra); Zubin Mehta, conductor; Gunther Breest, producer – Puccini: La Fanciulla del West (Royal Opera House Chorus and Orchestra); John Frandsen, conductor; Peter Willemoes, producer – Nielsen: Maskarade (Danish Radio Symphony Chorus and Orchestra); Colin Davis, conductor; Erik Smith, producer – Mozart: La Clemenza Di Tito (Royal Opera House Chorus and Orchestra); Julius Rudel, conductor; Christopher Bishop, producer – Charpentier: Louise (Chorus and Orchestra of Paris Opera); Herbert von Karajan, conductor; Michel Glotz, producer – R. Strauss: Salome (Berlin Philharmonic)	
1980	Vittorio Negri (producer); Colin Davis (conductor), Heather Harper, Jonathan Summers, Jon Vickers	Britten: Peter Grimes	Royal Opera House Orchestra	Julius Rudel, conductor; John Fraser, producer – Verdi: Rigoletto (Ambrosian Opera Chorus; Philharmonia Orchestra); James Levine, conductor; Richard Mohr, producer – Verdi: Otello (National Philharmonic Orchestra); Mstislav Rostropovich, conductor; Suvi Raj Grubb, producer – Shostakovich: Lady Macbeth of Mtsensk (Ambrosian Opera Chorus; London Philharmonic); Rafael Kubelík, conductor; Friedrich Welz & John Willan, producers – Hindemith: Mathis Der Maler (Bavarian Radio Chorus; Bavarian Radio Orchestra)	
1981	Gunther Breest, Michael Horwath (producers), Pierre Boulez (conductor), Toni Blankenheim, Franz Mazura, Hanna Schwarz, Yvonne Minton, Teresa Stratas	Berg: Lulu	Orchestre de l'Opéra de Paris	Julius Rudel, conductor; Eric Salzman, producer – Weill: Silverlake (New York City Opera Chorus and Orchestra); James Levine, conductor; John Mordler, producer – Puccini: La Boheme (Ambrosian Opera Chorus; National Philharmonic Orchestra); Herbert von Karajan, conductor; Michel Glotz, producer – Debussy: Pelleas Et Melisande (Berlin Philharmonic); Georg Solti, conductor; Christopher Raeburn, producer – Bartók: Bluebeard's Castle (London Philharmonic)	
1982	James Mallinson (producer), Charles Mackerras (conductor), Jiri Zahradnicek, Ivo Žídek, Václav Zítek (soloists)	Janáček: From the House of the Dead	Vienna Philharmonic	Peter Hofmann, Kurt Moll, Siegmund Nimsgern, José van Dam, Dunja Vejzović, Victor von Halem, soloists; Herbert von Karajan, conductor; Gunther Breest, producer – Wagner: Parsifal (Deutsche Oper Berlin Chorus; Berlin Philharmonic); Kathleen Battle, Marilyn Horne, Ernesto Palacio, Samuel Ramey, soloists; Claudio Scimone, conductor; Michel Garcin, producer – Rossini: L'italiana In Algeri (Prague Chorus; I Solisti Veneti); Plácido Domingo, Tito Gobbi, Leo Nucci, Renata Scotto, soloists; Lorin Maazel, conductor; Paul Myers, producer – Puccini: Le Villi (Ambrosian Opera Chorus; National Philharmonic); Richard Stilwell and Frederica von Stade, soloists; Raymond Leppard, conductor; David Mottley, producer – Monteverdi: Il Ritorno D'ulisse In Patria (Glyndebourne Festival Opera Chorus; London Philharmonic); Walter Berry, Ruth Hesse, Siegfried Jerusalem, Éva Marton, soloists; Marek Jankowsky, conductor; George Korngold, producer – Korngold: Violanta (Bavarian Radio Chorus; Munich Radio Orchestra); Anja Silja, Eberhard Waechter, soloists; Christoph von Dohnanyi, conductor; Michael Haas & Christopher Raeburn, producers – Berg: Wozzeck (Vienna State Opera Chorus; Vienna Philharmonic)	
1983	Andrew Kazdin (producer), Pierre Boulez (conductor), Jeannine Altmeyer, Hermann Becht, Peter Hofmann, Siegfried Jerusalem, Gwyneth Jones, Manfred Jung, Donald McIntyre, Matti Salminen, Ortrun Wenkel, Heinz Zednik (soloists)	Wagner: Der Ring des Nibelungen	Bayreuth Festival Orchestra	Siegfried Jerusalem, Gwendolyn Killebrew, Siegmund Nimsgern, Lucia Popp, Hermann Prey, soloists; Heinz Wallberg, conductor; George Korngold, producer – Weinberger: Schwanda, The Bagpiper (Bavarian Radio Chorus; Munich Radio Orchestra); Piero de Palma, Plácido Domingo, Barbara Hendricks, Gottfried Hornik, Ruggero Raimondi, Katia Ricciarelli, soloists; Herbert von Karajan, conductor; Gunther Breest & Michel Glotz, producers – Puccini: Turandot (Vienna Boys Choir & Vienna State Opera Chorus; Vienna Philharmonic); Renato Bruson, Plácido Domingo, Renata Scotto, soloists; James Levine, conductor; John Willan, producer – Puccini: Tosca (Philharmonia Orchestra); Dalibor Jedlicka, Charles Mackerras, Lucia Popp, Eva Randova, soloists; James Mallinson, producer – Janácek: The Cunning Little Vixen (Vienna Philharmonic); Philippe Huttenlocher, Jessye Norman, Alain Vanzo, soloists; Charles Dutoit, conductor; Michel Garcin, producer – Faure: Penelope (Orchestre Philharmonique)	
1984	Jay David Saks, Max Wilcox (producers), James Levine (conductor), Plácido Domingo, Cornell MacNeil, Teresa Stratas; Christopher Raeburn (producer), Georg Solti (conductor), Thomas Allen, Kurt Moll, Lucia Popp, Samuel Ramey, Kiri Te Kanawa & Frederica von Stade	Verdi: La traviata; Mozart: Le nozze di Figaro	Metropolitan Opera Orchestra; London Philharmonic	Hildegard Behrens, Leonard Bernstein, Brigitte Fassbaender, Peter Hofmann, Carlos Kleiber, René Kollo, Yvonne Minton, Kurt Moll, Margaret Price, Hans Sotin & Bernd Weikl; Hans Hirsch, John McClure & Erik Smith, producers – Wagner: Tristan Und Isolde (Bavarian Radio Symphony Chorus; Bavarian Radio Symphony Orchestra); Brenda Boozer, Renato Bruson, Carlo Maria Giulini, Dalmacio Gonzalez, Barbara Hendricks, Leo Nucci, Katia Ricciarelli & Lucia Valentini Terrani; Gunther Breest & Renate Kupfer, producers – Verdi: Falstaff (Los Angeles Master Chorale; Los Angeles Philharmonic Orchestra); Claudio Abbado, Plácido Domingo, Nicolai Ghiaurov, Leo Nucci, Elena Obraztsova, Ruggero Raimondi & Katia Ricciarelli; Rainer Brock, producer – Verdi: Aida (La Scala Opera Chorus; La Scala Opera Orchestra)	
1985	Michel Glotz (producer), Lorin Maazel (conductor), Julia Migenes-Johnson, Plácido Domingo, Ruggero Raimondi, Faith Esham	Bizet: Carmen	Choeurs Et Maitrise De Radio France; Orchestre National de France	Renato Bruson, Plácido Domingo, Mirella Freni, Nicolai Ghiaurov & Riccardo Muti; John Mordler, producer – Verdi: Ernani (La Scala Theatre Chorus; La Scala Theatre Orchestra); Thomas Allen, Maria Ewing, Elizabeth Gale, Bernard Haitink, Keith Lewis, John Rawnsley, Richard Van Allan & Carol Vaness; John Fraser & Dimitri Kavrakos, producers – Mozart: Don Giovanni (Glyndebourne Chorus; London Philharmonic); Peter Dvorský, Charles Mackerras, Wieslav Ochman, Eva Randova & Elisabeth Söderström; James Mallinson, producer – Janácek: Jenufa (Vienna Philharmonic); Colin Davis, Helen Donath, Heather Harper & Robert Tear; Erik Smith, producer – Britten: The Turn of the Screw (Royal Opera House Orchestra – Covent Garden)	
1986	James Mallinson (producer), Georg Solti (conductor), Philip Langridge, Franz Mazura	Schoenberg: Moses und Aron	Chicago Symphony Orchestra and Chorus	Peter Hofmann, Kurt Moll, José van Dam, Dunja Vejzović & Herbert von Karajan; Michel Glotz, producer – Wagner: Der Fliegende Hollander (The Flying Dutchman) (Vienna State Opera Chorus; Berlin Philharmonic); Riccardo Chailly, Stafford Dean, John Dobson, Philip Langridge, Cathryn Pope, Samuel Ramey & Sarah Walker; Andrew Cornall, producer – Stravinsky: The Rake's Progress (London Sinfonietta Chorus; London Sinfonietta Orchestra); Renato Bruson, Plácido Domingo, Mirella Freni, Robert Gambill, Kurt Rydl & Giuseppe Sinopoli; Wolfgang Stengel, producer – Puccini: Manon Lescaut (Royal Opera House Chorus Of Covent Garden; Philharmonia Orchestra); Florindo Andreolli, Plácido Domingo, Juan Pons, Georges Prêtre, Alberto Rinaldi & Teresa Stratas; Rudolph Werner, producer – Leoncavallo: Pagliacci (Milano Teatro Alla Scala Chorus; Milano Teatro Alla Scala Orchestra)	
1987	Elizabeth Ostrow (producer), John Mauceri (conductor), James Billings, Joyce Castle, Maris Clement, David Eisler, Jack Harrold, John Lankston, Erie Mills, Scott Reeve	Bernstein: Candide	New York City Opera Orchestra	Kathleen Battle, Renato Bruson, Christa Ludwig, Luciano Pavarotti, Margaret Price & Georg Solti; Christopher Raeburn, producer – Verdi: Un Ballo In Maschera (The Masked Ball) (National Philharmonic Orchestra); Justino Díaz, Plácido Domingo, Lorin Maazel & Katia Ricciarelli; David Groves & James Mallinson, producers – Verdi: Otello (La Scala Opera Chorus; La Scala Opera Orchestra); Claudio Abbado, Plácido Domingo, Nicolai Ghiaurov, Leo Nucci, Ruggero Raimondi, Katia Ricciarelli & Lucia Valentini Terrani; Rainer Brock, producer – Verdi: Don Carlos (La Scala Opera Chorus; La Scala Opera Orchestra); Aldo Baldin, Agnes Baltsa, Barbara Hendricks, Robert Lloyd, Neville Marriner, Felicity Palmer, Lucia Popp, Ruggero Raimondi & José van Dam; Erik Smith, producer – Mozart: The Marriage of Figaro (Academy of St. Martin-In-The-Fields)	
1988	Cord Garben (producer), James Levine (conductor), Agnes Baltsa, Kathleen Battle, Gary Lakes, Hermann Prey, Anna Tomowa-Sintow	R. Strauss: Ariadne auf Naxos	Vienna Philharmonic	Antonio Barasorda, Riccardo Chailly, Veriano Luchetti, Leo Nucci, Samuel Ramey & Shirley Verrett; Andrew Cornall, producer – Verdi: Macbeth (Bologna Coro del Teatro Comunale; Bologna Orchestra del Teatro Comunale); Thomas Allen, Kathleen Battle, Jorma Hynninen, Ann Murray, Riccardo Muti, Margaret Price & Kurt Rydl; James Mallinson, producer – Mozart: The Marriage of Figaro (Vienna Philharmonic Chorus; Vienna Philharmonic); Kathleen Battle, Edita Gruberova, Georg Solti, Martti Talvela, Gosta Winbergh & Heinz Zednik; Christopher Raeburn, producer – Mozart: The Abduction from The Seraglio (Vienna Philharmonic Chorus; Vienna Philharmonic); Agnes Baltsa, Kathleen Battle, Paata Burchuladze, Ferruccio Furlanetto, Alexander Malta, Samuel Ramey, Anna Tomowa-Sintow, Herbert von Karajan & Gosta Winbergh; Michel Glotz & Werner Mayer, producers – Mozart: Don Giovanni (Berlin Philharmonic Chorus; Berlin Philharmonic)	
1989	Christopher Raeburn (producer), Georg Solti (conductor), Plácido Domingo, Dietrich Fischer-Dieskau, Siegmund Nimsgern, Jessye Norman, Eva Randova, Hans Sotin	Wagner: Lohengrin	Vienna State Opera Orchestra	Leonard Bernstein, Barbara Daniels, Jerry Hadley, Thomas Hampson & Angelina Reaux; Hans Weber, producer – Puccini: La Boheme (Chorus of Santa Cecilia; Orchestra of Santa Cecilia); Agnes Baltsa, Edita Gruberova, Leo Nucci, Luciano Pavarotti, Lucia Popp & John Pritchard; Christopher Raeburn, producer – Mozart: Idomeneo (Vienna Philharmonic Chorus; Vienna Philharmonic); Leonard Bernstein, John Brandstetter, Peter Kazaras, Jean Kraft, Chester Ludgin, Beverly Morgan & Wendy White; Hans Weber, producer – Bernstein/Wadsworth: A Quiet Place (Austrian Radio Symphony Orchestra); Richard Bonynge, Montserrat Caballé, Luciano Pavarotti, Samuel Ramey & Joan Sutherland; Andrew Cornall, producer – Bellini: Norma (Welsh National Opera Chorus; Welsh National Opera Orchestra); Edo De Waart, John Duykers, Thomas Hammons, James Maddalena, Carolann Page & Sanford Sylvan; Wilhelm Hellweg, producer – Adams: Nixon in China (Orchestra Of St. Luke's)	
1990	Cord Garben (producer), James Levine (conductor), Hildegard Behrens, Gary Lakes, Christa Ludwig, Kurt Moll, James Morris, Jessye Norman, Marilyn Mims	Wagner: Die Walküre	Metropolitan Opera Orchestra	Thomas Allen, Paata Burchuladze, Mirella Freni, Rosemarie Lang, James Levine, Neil Shicoff & Anne Sofie von Otter; Cord Garben, producer – Tchaikovsky: Eugen Onegin (Dresden State Orchestra); Hildegard Behrens, Jorma Hynninen, Christa Ludwig, Seiji Ozawa, Nadine Secunde & Ragnar Ulfung; Wilhelm Hellweg, producer – R. Strauss: Elektra (Tanglewood Chorus; Boston Symphony Orchestra); Gregg Baker, Harolyn Blackwell, Cynthia Clarey, Damon Evans, Cynthia Haymon, Bruce Hubbard, Simon Rattle & Willard White; David R. Murray, producer – Gershwin: Porgy and Bess (London Philharmonic); Claudio Abbado, Hildegard Behrens, Franz Grundheber, Aage Haugland, Philip Langridge, Walter Raffeiner & Heinz Zednik; Christopher Alder & Werner Mayer, producers – Berg: Wozzeck (Vienna Philharmonic)	
1991	Cord Garben (producer), James Levine (conductor), Siegfried Jerusalem, Christa Ludwig, Kurt Moll, James Morris, Jan Hendrik Rootering, Ekkehard Wlaschiha, Heinz Zednik	Wagner: Das Rheingold	Metropolitan Opera Orchestra	Mario Adorf, Helga Dernesch, René Kollo, Ute Lemper, John Mauceri & Milua; Michael Haas, producer – Weill: The Threepenny Opera (Berlin RIAS Sinfonietta); Ernesto Gavazzi, Riccardo Muti, Samuel Ramey, Neil Shicoff, Cheryl Studer, Giorgio Surian & Giorgio Zancanaro; David Groves, producer – Verdi: Attila (Milano Teatro Alla Scala Chorus; Milano Teatro Alla Scala Orchestra); Gabriel Bacquier, Jules Bastin, Catherine Dubosc, Georges Gautier, Kent Nagano & Jean-Luc Viala; Arend Prohmann, producer – Prokofiev: The Love For Three Oranges (Lyon Opera Chorus; Orchestra De Lyon); Nicolai Gedda, Paul Plishka, Ruggero Raimondi, Kenneth Riegel, Mstislav Rostropovich, Romauld Tesarowicz & Galina Vichnievskaia; Michel Garcin, producer – Mussorgsky: Boris Godunov (National Symphony Orchestra)	
1992	Cord Garben (producer), James Levine (conductor), Hildegard Behrens, Reiner Goldberg, Matti Salminen, Hanna Schwarz, Cheryl Studer, Bernd Weikl, Ekkehard Wlaschiha	Wagner: Götterdämmerung	Metropolitan Opera Orchestra	Marjana Lipovšek, Éva Marton, Wolfgang Sawallisch, Cheryl Studer, Bernd Weikl & Hermann Winkler; Wilhelm Meister, producer – Strauss: Elektra (Bavarian Radio Chorus; Bavarian Radio Orchestra); Claudio Abbado, Robert Gambill, Thomas Hampson, Robert Holl, Karita Mattila, Laszlo Polgar, Josef Protschka & Cheryl Studer; Christopher Alder, producer – Schubert: Fierrabras (Chamber Orchestra of Europe); Claudio Abbado, Vladimir Atlantov, Paata Burchuladze, Aage Haugland, Anatoly Kotcherga, Marjana Lipovšek & Vladimir Popov; Christopher Alder, producer – Mussorgsky: Khovanshchina (Vienna State Opera Orchestra); John Eliot Gardiner, Hillevi Martinpelto, Sylvia McNair, Nigel Robson, Anthony Rolf-Johnson & Anne Sofie von Otter; Karl-August Naegler, producer – Mozart: Idomeneo (English Baroque Soloists); Collette Alliot-Lugaz, Gilles Cachemaille, Claudine Carlson, Charles Dutoit, Francois Golfier, Didier Henry & Pierre Thau; Raymond Minshull, producer – Debussy Pelleas Et Melisande (Montreal Symphony Orchestra)	
1993	Christopher Raeburn, Stephen Trainor, Morten Winding (producers), Georg Solti (conductor), Hildegard Behrens, José van Dam, Plácido Domingo, Sumi Jo, Reinhild Runkel, Júlia Várady	R. Strauss: Die Frau ohne Schatten	Vienna Philharmonic	Kathleen Battle, Hildegard Behrens, Reiner Goldberg, James Levine, Kurt Moll, James Morris, Birgitta Svenden, Ekkehard Wlaschiha & Heinz Zednik; Cord Garben, producer – Wagner: Siegfried (Metropolitan Opera Orchestra); Vladimir Atlantov, Katherine Ciesinski, Maureen Forrester, Mirella Freni, Dmitri Hvorostovsky, Sergei Leiferkus & Seiji Ozawa; Jay David Saks, producer – Tchaikovsky: Pique Dame (The Queen of Spades) (Boston Symphony Orchestra); Thomas Allen, Gwyne Howell, Diana Montague, Simon Rattle, Robert Tear & Lillian Watson; David Murray, producer – Janácek: The Cunning Little Vixen (Royal Opera House Orchestra – Covent Garden); Bernards Fink, Rene Jacobs, Oliver Lallouette, Jennifer Larmore, Derek Lee Ragin, Marianne Rorholm, Barbara Schlick, Dominique Visse & Furio Zanasi; Thomas Gallia & Klaus L. Neuman, producers – Handel: Giulio Cesare (Concerto Koln)	
1994	Steven Paul (producer), John Nelson (conductor), John Aler, Kathleen Battle, Michael Chance, Mark S. Doss, Marilyn Horne, Neil Mackie, Sylvia McNair, Samuel Ramey	Handel: Semele	Ambrosian Opera Chorus and the English Chamber Orchestra	Olga Borodina, Vassily Gerelo, Alxandr Gergalov, Valery Gergiev, Gegam Gregoriam, Yuri Marusin, Nikolay Okhotnikov & Yelena Prokina; Erik Smith, producer – Prokofiev: War and Peace (Kirov Opera Chorus and Orchestra St. Petersburg); Thomas Allen, Sylvie Brunet, Riccardo Muti, Giorgio Surian, Carol Vaness & Gosta Winbergh; David Mottley, producer – Gluck: Iphigenie En Tauride (La Scala Theatre Chorus (Coro Del Teatro Alla Scala); La Scala Theatre Orchestra (Orch. Del Teatro Alla Scala)); John Mark Ainsley, Josephine Barstow, Della Jones, Yvonne Kenny, Philip Langridge, Charles Mackerras, Everett Opie, John Shirley-Quirk, Jonathan Summers, Bryn Terfel, Richard Van Allan & Willard White; Andrew Cornall & Morten Winding, producers – Britten: Gloriana (Welsh National Opera Chorus; Welsh National Opera Orchestra); Stephanie Friedman, Thomas Hammons, James Maddalena, Sheila Nadler, Kent Nagano & Sanford Sylvan; John McClure, producer – Adams: The Death of Klinghoffer (Orchestre of Opera de Lyon)	
1995	Martin Sauer (producer), Kent Nagano (conductor), Kenn Chester, Jerry Hadley, Samuel Ramey, Cheryl Studer	Floyd: Susannah	Orchestre of Opéra de Lyon and Chorus	Ben Heppner, Cornelia Kallisch, Siegfried Lorenz, Kurt Moll, Wolfgang Sawallisch, Cheryl Studer, Deon Van Der Walt & Bernd Weikl; Wilhelm Meister, producer – Wagner: Die Meistersinger Von Nurnberg (Bavarian State Opera Chorus; Bavarian State Opera Orchestra); Myung-Whun Chung, Maria Ewing, Aage Haugland, Anatoly Kotcherga, Philip Langridge, Sergei Larin, Kurt Moll, Elena Zaremba & Heinz Zednik; Lennart Dehn, producer – Shostakovich: Lady Macbeth of Mtsensk (Choeurs De L'Opera Bastille; Orchestre de L'Opera Bastille); Jennifer Larmore, Frank Lopardo, Ion Marin, Samuel Ramey & Cheryl Studer; Arend Prohmann, producer – Rossini: Semiramide (Ambrosian Opera Chorus; London Symphony Orchestra); Gunter Appenheimer, Stefan Dahlberg, Mechthild Gessendorf, Wolfgang Holzmair, Philippe Huttenlocher, Michael Kraus, Susan Mentzer, Thomas Mohr, Kent Nagano, Ernst Theo Richter, Anne-Marie Rodde, Mark Schafer, Franz-Josef Selig, Gabriele Sima & Falk Struckmann; Arend Prohmann & Martin Sauer, producers – Busoni: Arlecchino and Turandot (Orchestre of Opera De Lyon)	
1996	Raymond Minshull (producer), Charles Dutoit (conductor), Gary Lakes, Françoise Pollet, Gino Quilico, Deborah Voigt	Berlioz: Les Troyens	L'Orchestra Symphonie Montreal and Chorus	Anna Maria di Micco, Sumi Jo, Lucretia Lendi, Stanford Olsen, Ewa Podles, Pietro Spagnoli & Alberto Zedda; Gunter Appenheimer, producer – Rossini: Tancredi (Capella Brugensis Chorus; Collegium Instrumentale Brugense); Cecilia Bartoli, Barbara Bonney, Gilles Cachemaille, Uwe Heilmann, Christopher Hogwood, Della Jones & Diana Montague; Christopher Sayers, Morten Winding & Michael Woolcock, producers – Mozart: La Clemenza Di Tito (Academy of Ancient Music Chorus; Academy of Ancient Music); Julian Clarkson, Ildebrando D'Arcangelo, John Eliot Gardiner, Rodney Gilfry, Eirian James, Charlotte Margiono, Luba Orgonasova, Christoph Pregardien & Andrea Silvestrelli; Karl-August Naegler, producer – Mozart: Don Giovanni (Monteverdi Chorus; English Baroque Soloists); Olga Borodina, Nikolai Gassiev, Valery Gergiev, Galina Gorchakova, Gegam Gregoriam & Mikhail Kit; Anna Barry, producer – Borodin: Prince Igor (Kirov Opera Chorus and Orchestra St. Petersburg)	
1997	Brian Couzens (producer), Richard Hickox (conductor), Philip Langridge, Alan Opie, Janice Watson	Britten: Peter Grimes	London Symphony Chorus and the City of London Sinfonia	Gilles Cachemaille, Nikolaus Harnoncourt, Wolfgang Holzmair, Kurt Moll, Luba Orgonasova, Matti Salminen, Christine Schafer & Endrik Wottrich; Helmet Muhle, producer – Weber: Der Freischutz (Berlin Philharmonic); Henriette Bonde-Hansen, Inger Dam-Jensen, Thomas Dausgaard, Gert Henning-Jensen, Johannes Mannov, Inga Nielsen, Guido Paevatalu, Johan Reuter & Marianne Rorholm; Claus Due, producer – Kunzen: Holger Danske (Danish National Radio Symphony Chorus; Danish National Radio Symphony Orchestra); Alison Hagley, Jennifer Larmore, Donald Runnicles & Dawn Upshaw; James Mallinson, producer – Gluck: Orphee et Eurydice (San Francisco Opera Chorus and Orchestra); Phyllis Bryn-Julson, Howard Haskin, Jorma Hynninen & Esa-Pekka Salonen; David Mottley, producer – Dallapiccola: Il Prigioniero (Eric Chamber Chorus Ericson & Swedish Radio Symphony Chorus and Orchestra)	
1998	Michael Woolcock (producer), Georg Solti (conductor), José van Dam, Ben Heppner, Herbert Lippert, Karita Mattila, Alan Opie, René Pape, Iris Vermillion	Wagner: Die Meistersinger von Nürnberg	Chicago Symphony Orchestra	William Christie, Lorraine Hunt, Eirian James, Laurent Naouri, Mark Padmore & Anna-Maria Panzarella; Martin Sauer, producer – Rameau: Hippolyte et Aricie (Les Arts Florissants Chorus; Les Arts Florissants Orchestra); Renee Fleming, Ann Murray, Michele Pertusi, Georg Solti & Bryn Terfel; Michael Woolcock, producer – Mozart: Don Giovanni (London Voices; London Philharmonic); Gennady Bezzubenkov, Larissa Diadkova, Valery Gergiev, Galina Gorchakova, Anna Netrebko & Vladimir Ognovienko; Stan Taal, producer – Glinka: Ruslan and Lyudmila (Kirov Opera Chorus and Orchestra St. Petersburg); Matthias Gorne, Wolfgang Holzmair, Michael Kraus, Hellen Kwon, Endrik Wottrich & Lothar Zagrosek; Morten Winding & Michael Woolcock, producers – Braunfels: Die Vogel (Rundfunkchor Berlin; Deutsches Symphony Orchestra Berlin)	
1999	Pierre Boulez (conductor), Jessye Norman, László Polgár	Bartók: Bluebeard's Castle	Chicago Symphony Orchestra	Sergei Alexashkin, Larissa Diadkova, Valery Gergiev & Nikolai Putilin; Stan Taal, producer – Tchaikovsky: Mazeppa (Kirov Opera Chorus and Orchestra St. Petersburg); Paul Agnew, William Christie, Sarah Connolly, Sophie Daneman & Thierry Felix; Jean-Pierre Loisil, producer – Rameau: Les Fetes D'Hebe (Les Arts Florissants Chorus; Les Arts Florissants Orchestra); Larissa Diadkova, Nikolai Gassiev & Valery Gergiev; Stan Taal, producer – Prokofiev: Betrothal in a Monastery (Kirov Opera Chorus and Orchestra St. Petersburg); Horacio Ferrer, Jairo, Gidon Kremer & Julia Zenko; Helmut Muhle, producer – Piazzolla: Maria de Buenos Aires (Buenos Aires Coral Lirico)	
2000	Nicholas Parker (producer), John Eliot Gardiner (conductor), Ian Bostridge, Anne Sofie von Otter, Bryn Terfel, Deborah York	Stravinsky: The Rake's Progress	Monteverdi Choir and London Symphony Orchestra	Henriette Bonde-Hansen, Aage Haugland, Gert-Henning Jensen, Kurt Ravn, Susanne Resmark, Ulf Schirmer & Bo Skovhus; Chris Hazell, producer – Nielsen: Maskarade (Danish National Radio Chorus); Kent Nagano, Dawn Upshaw & José Van Dam; Sid McLauchlan, producer – Messiaen: Saint François D'Assise (Arnold Schoenberg Chorus; Hallé Orchestra); Laura Claycomb, Sibylle Ehlert, Charlotte Hellekant, Derek Lee Ragin, Esa-Pekka Salonen & Jard van Nes; Ulrich Schneider, producer – Ligeti: Le Grand Macabre (London Sinfonietta Voices; Philharmonia Orchestra); Renée Fleming, Ben Heppner & Charles Mackerras; Michael Haas, producer – Dvorák: Rusalka (Kuhn Mixed Chorus; Czech Philharmonic Orchestra); Thomas Adès, Valdine Anderson, Roger Bryson, Jill Gomez & Niall Morris; Chris de Souza, producer – Adès: Powder Her Face (Almeida Ensemble)	
2001	Martin Sauer (producer), Jean Chatauret (engineer), Kent Nagano (conductor), Kim Begley, Dietrich Fischer-Dieskau, Dietrich Henschel, Markus Hollop, Eva Jenis, Torsten Kerl	Busoni: Doktor Faust	Orchestre de l'Opera Nationale de Lyon	John Mark Ainsley, Véronique Gens & Laurent Naouri; Marc Minkowski, conductor; Michel Gache & Arend Prohmann, producers – Rameau: Dardanus (Les Musiciens du Louvre); Lyudmila Filatova, Viktor Lutsiuk, Tatiana Pavlovskaya & Olga Savova; Valery Gergiev, conductor; Stan Taal, producer – Prokofiev: Semyon Kotko (Kirov Orchestra); Simon Keenlyside, Philip Langridge & John Tomlinson; Richard Hickox, conductor; Brian Couzens, producer – Britten: Billy Budd (London Symphony Orchestra); Angela Denoke & Bo Skovhus; Ingo Metzmacher, conductor; John Fraser, producer – Berg: Wozzeck (Hamburg Philharmonic State Orchestra)	
2002	James Mallinson (producer), Simon Rhodes (engineer), Colin Davis (conductor), Michelle DeYoung, Ben Heppner, Petra Lang, Peter Mattei, Stephen Milling, Sara Mingardo, Kenneth Tarver	Berlioz: Les Troyens	London Symphony Orchestra	Natalie Dessay, Albert Dohmen, Ben Heppner, Deborah Voigt & Anne Sofie von Otter; Giuseppe Sinopoli, conductor; Sid McLauchlan, producer – Strauss: Ariadne Auf Naxos (Staatskapelle Dresden); Anne Margrethe Dahl, Poul Elming, Hanne Fischer, Aage Haugland, Susanne Resmark & Marianne Rorholm; Michael Schonwandt, conductor; Henrik Sleiborg, producer – Ruders: Handmaid's Tale (Royal Danish Orchestra); Roberto Alagna & Angela Gheorghiu; Antonio Pappano, conductor; David Groves, producer – Massenet: Manon (Orch. Sym. de la Monnaie); Jaroslav Brezina, Ivan Kusnjer, Peter Straka & Eva Urbanová; Sir Charles Mackerras, conductor; Petr Vít, producer – Janácek: Sárka (Czech Philharmonic Orchestra)	
2003	Christoph Classen (producer), Eberhard Sengpiel, Tobias Lehmann (engineers), Daniel Barenboim (conductor), Jane Eaglen, Thomas Hampson, Waltraud Meier, René Pape, Peter Seiffert	Wagner: Tannhäuser	Chor der Deutschen Staatsoper Berlin and the Staatskapelle Berlin	Ian Bostridge, Barbara Frittoli, Anthony Rolfe Johnson, Lorraine Hunt Lieberson & Lisa Milne; Sir Charles Mackerras, conductor; John Fraser, producer – Mozart: Idomeneo (Scottish Chamber Orchestra); Richard Croft, David Daniels, Lynne Dawson, Gidon Saks & Anne Sofie von Otter; Marc Minkowski, conductor; Michel Gache & Arend Prohmann, producers – Handel: Hercules (Chorus des Musiciens du Louvre); Paul Groves & Anne Sofie von Otter; Sir John Eliot Gardiner, conductor; Martha de Francisco, producer – Gluck: Alceste (Monteverdi Choir; English Baroque Soloists); Ian Bostridge & Joan Rodgers; Daniel Harding, conductor; John Fraser, producer – Britten: The Turn of the Screw (Mahler Chamber Orchestra)	
2004	Wolfram Graul (producer), Bernard Haitink (conductor), Jerry Hadley, Karita Mattila, Eva Randová, Anja Silja, Jorma Silvasti	Janáček: Jenůfa	Orchestra of the Royal Opera House and Chorus	George Manahan, conductor; Thomas Z. Shepard, producer; Jerry Hadley, Jeffrey Lentz, Victoria Livengood, James Morris & Mel Ulrich, soloists – Thomas: Desire Under The Elms (London Symphony Orchestra); William Christie, conductor; Arnaud Moral, producer; Nathan Berg, Gaëlle Méchaly, Mark Padmore & Anna-Maria Panzarella, soloists – Rameau: Zoroastre (Les Arts Florissants); Simone Young, conductor; Harald Steger, producer; Soile Isokoski, Alastair Miles, Regina Schörg, Neil Shicoff & Zoran Todorovic, soloists – Halévy: La Juive (Chor der Wiener Staatsoper; Orchester der Wiener Staatsoper); Peter Eötvös, conductor; Dietmar Wolf, producer; Péter Fried & Cornelia Kallisch, soloists – Bartók: Bluebeard's Castle, Op. 11 (Radio-Sinfonieorchester, Stuttgart)	
2005	Martin Sauer (producer), René Jacobs (conductor), Patrizia Ciofi, Véronique Gens, Simon Keenlyside, Angelika Kirchschlager, Lorenzo Regazzo	Mozart: Le nozze di Figaro	Concerto Köln	René Jacobs, conductor; Martin Sauer, producer; Dorothea Röschmann & Lawrence Zazzo, soloists – Scarlatti, A.: Griselda (Akademie für Alte Musik Berlin); Emmanuelle Haïm; Daniel Zalay, producer; Ian Bostridge & Susan Graham, soloists – Purcell: Dido and Aeneas (European Voices; Le Concert D'Astrée); Antoni Ros Marbá, conductor; Antoni Parera Fons, producer; Antonio Comas, Enric Martínez-Castignani, Marisa Martins, Isabel Monar & Stefano Palatchi, soloists – Montsalvatge: El Gato con Botas (Orquestra Simfònica Del Gran Teatre Del Liceu); Emmanuelle Haïm; Daniel Zalay, producer; Ian Bostridge, Patrizia Ciofi & Natalie Dessay, soloists – Monteverdi: L'Orféo (European Voices; Le Concert D'Astrée)	
2006	Sir Colin Davis (conductor); Carlos Alvarez, Bülent Bezdüz, Marina Domashenko, Jane Henschel, Ana Ibarra, Maria Josè Moreno, Michele Pertusi; James Mallinson (producer)	Verdi: Falstaff	London Symphony Chorus; London Symphony Orchestra	Fabio Biondi, conductor; Nicolas Bartholomeé, producer; Patrizia Ciofi, Ildebrando D'Arcangelo, David Daniels, Elina Garanca, Vivica Genaux & Marijana Mijanovic, soloists – Vivaldi: Bajazet (Europa Galante); Semyon Bychkov, conductor; Michael Haas, producer; Johan Botha, Renée Fleming, Anna Larsson, Michael Schade & Kwanchul Youn, soloists – Strauss, R.: Daphne (West German Radio Symphony Orchestra (Köln)); Paul O'Dette & Stephen Stubbs, conductors; Renate Wolter-Seevers, producer; Barbara Borden, Karina Gauvin, Ellen Hargis, Jan Kobow, Julian Podger, Marek Rzepka, James Taylor & Matthew White, soloists – Conradi: Ariadne (Boston Early Music Festival Chorus; Boston Early Music Festival Orchestra); Richard Hickox, conductor; Brian Couzens, producer; Michael Chance, Philip Langridge & Alan Opie, soloists – Britten: Death in Venice (BBC Singers; City of London Sinfonia)	
2007	Robert Spano (conductor); Kelley O'Connor, Jessica Rivera, Dawn Upshaw; Valérie Gross and Sid McLauchlan (producers)	Golijov: Ainadamar: Fountain Of Tears	Women Of The Atlanta Symphony Orchestra Chorus; Atlanta Symphony Orchestra	Carlo Rizzi, conductor; Rainer Maillard, producer; Thomas Hampson, Anna Netrebko & Rolando Villazón, soloists – Verdi: La Traviata (Konzertvereinigung Wiener Staatsopernchor; Wiener Philharmoniker); Charles Mackerras, conductor; Brian Couzens, producer; Yvette Bonner, Paul Charles Clarke, Neal Davies, Susan Gritton, Kit Hesketh-Harvey, Yvonne Howard, Robin Leggate, Diana Montague, Geoffrey Moses, Timothy Robinson & Peter Rose, soloists – Smetana: The Bartered Bride (The Royal Opera Chorus; Philharmonia Orchestra); René Jacobs, conductor; Martin Sauer, producer; Marie-Claude Chappuis, Bernarda Fink, Sergio Foresti, Sunhae Im, Mark Padmore & Alexandrina Pendatchanska, soloists – Mozart: La Clemenza Di Tito (RIAS Kammerchor; Freiburger Barockorchester); Stewart Robertson, conductor; Blanton Alspaugh, producer; Brian Anderson, Dorothy Byrne, Beth Clayton, Kristopher Irmiter, Brandon Jovanovich, James Maddalena, Michael Todd Simpson & Caroline Worra, soloists – Bennett: The Mines of Sulphur (Glimmerglass Opera Orchestra)	
2008	Sir Charles Mackerras (conductor); Brian Couzens (producer); Jane Henschel, Jennifer Larmore, Rebecca Evans (soloists); Ralph Couzens, engineer,	Humperdinck: Hansel and Gretel	New London Children's Choir; Philharmonia Orchestra	Zubin Mehta, conductor; Andreas Caemmerer & Felix Gargerle, producers; Piotr Beczala, Paolo Gavanelli & Anja Harteros, soloists – Verdi: La Traviata (Choir of the Bavarian State Opera; Bavarian State Orchestra); Paul O'Dette & Stephen Stubbs, conductors; Renate Wolter-Seevers, producer; Howard Crook, Ellen Hargis, Laura Pudwell & Harry van der Kamp, soloists – Lully: Thésée (Boston Early Music Festival Chorus and Orchestra); Mark Elder, conductor; Patric Schmid, producer; Carmelo Corrado Caruso, Giuseppe Filianoti, Vesselina Kasarova, Simon Keenlyside & Alastair Miles, soloists – Donizetti: Dom Sébastien, Roi De Portugal (The Royal Opera Chorus; The Orchestra of The Royal Opera House, Covent Garden); José de Eusebio, conductor; Michael Haas, producer; Enrique Baquerizo, Carlos Chausson, Plácido Domingo, Jane Henschel & Carol Vaness, soloists – Albéniz: Pepita Jiménez (Orquesta y Coro de la Comunidad De Madrid)	
2009	James Conlon (conductor); Anthony Dean Griffey, Patti LuPone, Audra McDonald; Fred Vogler (producer); Donnie Ray Albert, John Easterlin, Steven Humes, Mel Ulrich, Robert Wörle	Weill: Rise and Fall of the City of Mahagonny	Los Angeles Opera Orchestra; Los Angeles Opera Chorus	Valery Gergiev, conductor; Jay David Saks, producer; Renée Fleming, Dmitri Hvorostovsky & Ramon Vargas – Tchaikovsky: Eugene Onegin (The Metropolitan Opera Chorus; The Metropolitan Opera Orchestra); Rinaldo Alessandrini, conductor; Jean-Pierre Loisil, producer; Sara Mingardo, Monica Piccinini, Anna Simboli & Furio Zanasi, soloists – Monteverdi: L'Orfeo (Concerto Italiano); Paul O'Dette & Stephen Stubbs, conductors; Renate Wolter-Seevers, producer; Colin Balzer, Karina Gauvin, Carolyn Sampson & Aaron Sheehan, soloists – Lully: Psyché (Boston Early Music Festival Chorus and Orchestra); Tan Dun, conductor; Jay David Saks, producer; Michelle DeYoung, Plácido Domingo, Elizabeth Futral, Paul Groves, Wu Hsing-Kuo & Hao Jiang Tian, soloists – Tan Dun: The First Emperor (The Metropolitan Opera Chorus; The Metropolitan Opera Orchestra)	
2010	Daniel Harding (conductor); Ian Bostridge, Neal Davies, Nathan Gunn, Jonathan Lemalu, Matthew Rose, Gidon Saks, Andrew Kennedy, Daniel Teadt, Andrew Tortise, Rodrick Williams, John Fraser (producer)	Britten: Billy Budd	London Symphony Orchestra; Gentlemen of The London Symphony Chorus	Tan Dun, conductor; Ferenc van Damme, producer; Stephen Bryant, Sarah Castle, Nancy Lundy, Stephen Richardson, Charles Workman & Jun Zhang, soloists – Tan Dun: Marco Polo (Cappella Amsterdam; Netherlands Chamber Orchestra); Valery Gergiev, conductor; James Mallinson, producer; Andrei Popov, Sergei Semishkur & Vladislav Sulimsky, soloists – Shostakovich: The Nose (Chorus of the Mariinsky Theatre; Orchestra of the Mariinsky Theatre); Sara Jobin, conductor; Blanton Alspaugh, producer; Anne-Carolyn Bird, Lisa Hopkins, Joshua Jeremiah, Museop Kim, Jeremy Little, Rodell Rosel, Steven Sanders & Faith Sherman, soloists – Musto, John: Volpone (Wolf Trap Opera Company); Ingo Metzmacher, conductor; Ferenc van Damme, producer; Armand Arapian, Hubert Delamboye, Rod Gilfry, Henk Neven, Tom Randle & Camilla Tilling, soloists – Messiaen: Saint François D'Assise (Chorus of De Nederlandse Opera; The Hague Philharmonic)	
2011	Kent Nagano (conductor); Daniel Belcher, Ekaterina Lekhina, Marie-Ange Todorovitch; Martin Sauer, producer	Saariaho: L'Amour de loin	Deutsches Symphonie-Orchester Berlin; Rundfunkchor Berlin	David Lloyd-Jones, conductor; Brian Pidgeon, producer; Neal Davies, Geraldine McGreevy, James Rutherford, Toby Spence & Janice Watson, soloists – Sullivan: Ivanhoe (Adrian Partington Singers; BBC National Orchestra of Wales); Valery Gergiev, conductor; James Mallinson, producer; Evgeny Akimov, Sergei Aleksashkin & Kristina Kapustinskaya, soloists – Shchedrin: The Enchanted Wanderer (Chorus and Orchestra of the Mariinsky Theatre); Matthew Dirst, conductor; Keith Weber, producer; Jamie Barton & Ava Pine, soloists – Hasse: Marc' Antonio E Cleopatra (Ars Lyrica Houston); Antonio Pappano, conductor; David Groves, producer; Agneta Eichenholz, Jennifer Larmore, Klaus Florian Vogt & Michael Volle, soloists – Berg: Lulu (Orchestra of the Royal Opera House)	
2012	Alan Gilbert, conductor; Jay David Saks, producer; Meredith Arwady, Sasha Cooke, Richard Paul Fink, Gerald Finley, Thomas Glenn & Eric Owens, soloists	Adams: Doctor Atomic	Metropolitan Opera Chorus; Metropolitan Opera Orchestra	Fabio Biondi, conductor; Daniel Zalay, producer; Romina Basso, Patrizia Ciofi, Diana Damrau, Joyce DiDonato, Vivica Genaux, Philippe Jaroussky, Topi Lehtipuu & Rolando Villazón, soloists – Vivaldi: Ercole Sul Termodonte (Coro Da Camera Santa Cecilia Di Borgo San Lorenzo; Europa Galante); Antonio Pappano, conductor; James Whitbourn, producer; Joseph Calleja, Renée Fleming & Thomas Hampson, soloists – Verdi: La Traviata (Royal Opera Chorus; Nick Gold Orchestra Baobab); Hannu Lintu, conductor; Seppo Siirala, producer; Jaakko Kortekangas, Hannu Niemelä, Johanna Rusanen-Kartano & Mati Turi, soloists – Rautavaara: Kaivos (Kaivos Chorus; Tampere Philharmonic Orchestra); Mark Elder, conductor; James Whitbourn, producer; John Mark Ainsley, Phillip Ens, Jacques Imbrailo, Darren Jeffery, Iain Paterson & Matthew Rose, soloists (Glyndebourne Chorus; London Philharmonic Orchestra)	
2013	James Levine and Fabio Luisi (conductors), Hans-Peter König, Jay Hunter Morris, Bryn Terfel, Deborah Voigt (soloists), Jay David Saks (producer)	Wagner: Der Ring des Nibelungen	The Metropolitan Opera Chorus; The Metropolitan Opera Orchestra	Michael Boder (conductor), Paul Groves, Ashley Holland, Julia Juon, Patricia Petibon (soloists), Johannes Müller (producer) – Berg: Lulu (Symphony Orchestra Of The Gran Teatre Del Liceu); René Jacobs (conductor), Marcos Fink, Sunhae In, Bejun Mehta, Alexandrina Pendatchanska, Jennifer Rivera (soloists) – Handel: Agrippina (Akademie für Alte Musik Berlin); Vladimir Jurowski (conductor), Topi Lehtipuu, Miah Persson, Matthew Rose (soloists), Jean Chatauret (producer) – Stravinsky: The Rake's Progress (Glyndebourne Chorus; London Philharmonic Orchestra); Jordi Savall (conductor), Delphine Galou, Paolo Lopez, Roberta Mameli, Raffaela Milanesi, Furio Zanasi – Vivaldi: Teuzzone (Le Concert des Nations)	
2014	Thomas Adès (conductor); Simon Keenlyside, Isabel Leonard, Audrey Luna, William Burden, Alan Oke (soloists); Jay David Saks (producer)	Adès: The Tempest	The Metropolitan Opera Chorus; The Metropolitan Opera Orchestra	Oliver Knussen (conductor); Ian Bostridge, Peter Coleman-Wright, Susan Gritton, Angelika Kirchschlager (soloists); John Fraser (producer) – Britten: The Rape of Lucretia (Aldeburgh Festival Ensemble); Tönu Kaljuste (conductor); Anna Eimarsson and Johannes Weisser (soloists); Morten Lindberg (producer) – Kleiberg: David and Bathsheba (Trondheim Symphony Orchestra Vocal Ensemble; Trondheim Symphony Orchestra); Diego Fasolis (conductor); Valer Barna-Sabadus, Daniel Behle, Max Emanuel Cenčić, Franco Fagioli, Philippe Jaroussky (soloists); Ulrich Russcher (producer) – Vinci: Artaserse (Coro Della Radiotelevisione Svizzera, Lugano; Concerto Köln); Christian Thielemann (conductor); Katarina Dalayman, Albert Dohmen, Stephen Gould, Eric Halfvarson, Linda Watson (soloists); Ohmar Eichinger (producer) – Wagner: Der Ring des Nibelungen (Chor Der Wiener Staatsoper; Orchester Der Wiener Staatsoper)	
2015	Paul O'Dette and Stephen Stubbs (conductors); Aaron Sheehan (soloist); Siegbert Ernst, (engineer/mixer)	Charpentier: La descente d'Orphée aux enfers	Boston Early Music Festival Vocal Ensemble and Chamber Ensemble	Kenneth Kiesler (conductor); Dan Kempson, Jennifer Lane, Tamara Mumford, Julianna Di Giacomo, and Brenda Rae (soloists); Tim Handley (producer) – Milhaud: L'Orestie d'Eschyle (UMS Choral Union, University Of Michigan Chamber Choir, University Of Michigan Orpheus Singers & University Of Michigan University Choir; University Of Michigan Percussion Ensemble & University Of Michigan Symphony Orchestra); William Christie (conductor); Sarah Connolly, Stéphane Degout, Christiane Karg, Ed Lyon and Katherine Watson (soloists); Sébastien Chonion (producer) – Rameau: Hippolyte et Aricie (The Glyndebourne Chorus; Orchestra of The Age of Enlightenment); Sylvain Cambreling (conductor); Andreas Conrad and Franz Grundheber (soloists); Reinhard Oechsler (producer) – Schoenberg: Moses und Aron (EuropaChorAkademie; SWR Sinfonieorchester Baden-Baden und Freiburg); Christian Thielemann (conductor); Evelyn Herlitzius, Waltraud Meier, René Pape and Anne Schwanewilms (soloists); Magdalene Herbst (producer) – Strauss: Elektra (Sächsischer Staatsopernchor Dresden; Staatskapelle Dresden)	
2016	Seiji Ozawa (conductor); Isabel Leonard (soloist); Dominic Fyfe (producer); Jonathan Stokes (engineer)	Ravel: L'enfant et les sortilèges; Shéhérazade	SKF Matsumoto Children's Chorus & SKF Matsumoto Chorus; Saito Kinen Orchestra	Donald Runnicles (conductor), Will Hartmann, Michaela Kaune & Jennifer Larmore (soloists), Magdalena Herbst (producer) – Janácek: Jenufa (Chorus and Orchestra of the Deutsche Oper Berlin]); Martin Pearlman (conductor), Fernando Guimarães & Jennifer Riviera (soloists), Thomas C. Moore (producer) – Monteverdi: Il ritorno d'Ulisse in patria (Boston Baroque); Yannick Nézet-Séguin (conductor), Diana Damrau, Paul Schweinester & Rolando Villazón (soloists), Sid McLauchlan (producer) – Mozart: Die Entführung aus dem Serail (Chamber Orchestra of Europe); Paul O'Dette & Stephen Stubbs (conductors), Karina Gauvin & Philippe Jaroussky (soloists), Renate Wolter-Seevers (producer) – Steffani: Niobe, regina di Tebe (Boston Early Music Festival Orchestra)	
2017	James Conlon (conductor); Joshua Guerrero, Christopher Maltman, Lucas Meachem, Patricia Racette, Lucy Schaufer, & Guanqun Yu (soloists); Blanton Alspaugh (producer); Mark Donahue, Fred Vogler & David L Williams (engineers)	Corigliano: The Ghosts of Versailles	Los Angeles Opera Orchestra and Chorus	Giovanni Antonini (conductor); Cecilia Bartoli, Philippe Jaroussky, Andreas Scholl & Anne Sofie von Otter (soloists); Samuel Theis (producer) – Handel: Giulio Cesare (Il Giardino Armonico); Miguel Harth-Bedoya (conductor); Emily Fons, Nathan Gunn, Isabel Leonard & Jay Hunter Morris (soloists); Elizabeth Ostrow (producer) – Higdon: Cold Mountain (Santa Fe Opera Apprentice Program For Singers; The Santa Fe Opera Orchestra); Yannick Nézet-Séguin (conductor); Thomas Hampson, Christiane Karg, Luca Pisaroni & Sonya Yoncheva (soloists); Daniel Zalay (producer) – Mozart: Le nozze di Figaro (Vocalensemble Rastatt; Chamber Orchestra of Europe); Antonio Pappano (conductor); Georgia Jarman, Mariusz Kwiecień & Saimir Pirgu (soloists); Jonathan Allen (producer) – Szymanowski: Król Roger (Royal Opera Chorus; Orchestra Of The Royal Opera House)	
2018	Hans Graf (conductor); Anne Schwanewilms & Roman Trekel (soloists); Hans Graf & Brad Sayles (producers); Brad Sayles (engineer)	Berg: Wozzeck	Houston Symphony; Chorus of Students And Alumni, Shepherd School of Music, Rice University & Houston Grand Opera Children's Chorus	Lothar Koenigs (conductor); Daniel Brenna, Marlis Petersen & Johan Reuter (soloists); Jay David Saks, producer – Berg: Lulu (The Metropolitan Opera Orchestra); Gianandrea Noseda (conductor); Diana Damrau, Mariusz Kwiecień, Matthew Polenzani & Nicolas Testé (soloists); Jay David Saks, producer – Bizet: Les pêcheurs de perles (The Metropolitan Opera Orchestra; The Metropolitan Opera Chorus); George Petrou (conductor); Max Emanuel Cenčić & Lauren Snouffer (soloists); Jacob Händel, producer – Handel: Ottone (Il Pomo D'Oro); Valery Gergiev (conductor); Vladimir Feliauer, Aida Garifullina & Kira Loginova (soloists); Ilya Petrov, producer – Rimsky-Korsakov: The Golden Cockerel (Mariinsky Orchestra; Mariinsky Chorus)	
2019	Michael Christie (conductor); Sasha Cooke, Jessica E. Jones, Edward Parks, Garrett Sorenson & Wei Wu (soloists); Elizabeth Ostrow (producer); Mark Donahue & Dirk Sobotka (engineers); Mark Donahue (mixer)	Bates: The (R)evolution of Steve Jobs	Santa Fe Opera Orchestra	John Adams (conductor); Aubrey Allicock, Julia Bullock, Gerald Finley & Brindley Sherratt (soloists); Friedeman Engelbracht (producer) – Adams: Doctor Atomic (BBC Symphony Orchestra; BBC Singers); Christophe Rousset (conductor); Edwin Crossley-Mercer, Emiliano Gonzalez Toro & Judith van Wanroij (soloists); Maximilien Ciup (producer) – Lully: Alceste (Les Talens Lyriques; Chœur de chambre de Namur); Sebastian Weigle (conductor); Renée Fleming, Elīna Garanča, Günther Groissböck & Erin Morley (soloists); David Frost (producer) – R. Strauss: Der Rosenkavalier (Metropolitan Opera Orchestra; Metropolitan Opera Chorus); Constantine Orbelian (conductor); Francesco Demuro, Dmitri Hvorostovsky & Nadine Sierra (soloists); Vilius Keras & Aleksandra Keriene (producers) – Verdi: Rigoletto (Kaunas City Symphony; Men of the Kaunas State Choir)	
2020	Gil Rose (conductor and producer); John Brancy, Andrew Craig Brown, Gabriel Preisser, Krista River & Edwin Vega (soloists); Joel Gordon & Antonio Oliart (engineers/mixers)	Picker: Fantastic Mr. Fox	Boston Modern Orchestra Project; Boston Children's Chorus	George Benjamin (conductor); Stéphane Degout, Barbara Hannigan, Peter Hoare & Gyula Orendt (soloists); James Whitbourn (producer) – Benjamin: Lessons in Love & Violence (Orchestra of the Royal Opera House); Marc Albrecht (conductor); Christopher Maltman & Eva-Maria Westbroek (soloists); Francois Roussillion (producer) – Berg: Wozzeck (Netherlands Philharmonic Orchestra; Chorus of Dutch National Opera); Paul O'Dette & Stephen Stubbs (conductors); Jesse Blumberg, Teresa Wakim & Virginia Warnken (soloists); Renate Wolter-Seevers (producer) – Charpentier: Les Arts Florissants; Les Plaisirs de Versailles (Boston Early Music Festival Chamber Ensemble; Boston Early Music Festival Vocal Ensemble); Christian Thielemann (conductor); Piotr Beczała, Anja Harteros, Tomasz Konieczny, Waltraud Meier & Georg Zeppenfeld (soloists); Eckhardt Glauche (producer) – Wagner: Lohengrin (Festspielorchester Bayreuth; Festspielchor Bayreuth)	
2021	David Robertson (conductor); Angel Blue & Eric Owens (soloists); David Frost (producer); John Kerswell (engineer/mixer)	Gershwin: Porgy and Bess	The Metropolitan Opera Orchestra; The Metropolitan Opera Chorus	Gil Rose (conductor/producer); Heather Buck & Steven Powell (soloists) – Dello Joio: The Trial at Rouen (Boston Modern Opera Project; Odyssey Opera Chorus); William Boggs (conductor); Keith Phares & Kate Royal (soloists); Blanton Alspaugh (producer) – Floyd: Prince of Players (Milwaukee Symphony Orchestra; Florentine Opera Chorus); Maxim Emelyanychev (conductor); Elsa Benoit, Joyce DiDonato, Franco Fagioli, Jakub Józef Orliński & Luca Pisaroni (soloists); Daniel Zalay (producer) – Handel: Agrippina (Il Pomo d'Oro); Donald Runnicles (conductor); David Butt Philip & Elena Tsallagova (soloists); Peter Ghirardini & Erwin Stürzer (producers) – Zemlinsky: Der Zwerg (Deutsche Opera Berlin Chorus and Orchestra)	
2022	Karen Kamensek (conductor); J’Nai Bridges, Anthony Roth Costanzo, Zachary James & Dísella Lárusdóttir (soloists); David Frost (producer)	Glass: Akhnaten	The Metropolitan Opera Orchestra, The Metropolitan Opera Chorus	Susanna Mälkki (conductor); Mika Kares & Szilvia Vöröss (soloists); Robert Suff (producer) – Bartók: Bluebeard's Castle (Helsinki Philharmonic Orchestra); Simon Rattle (conductor); Sophia Burgos, Lucy Crowe, Gerald Finley, Peter Hoare, Anna Lapkovskaja, Paulina Malefane, Jan Martinik & Hanno Müller-Brachmann (soloists); Andrew Cornall (producer) – Janácek: Cunning Little Vixen (London Symphony Orchestra, London Symphony Chorus & LSO Discovery Voices); Corrado Rovaris (conductor); Jonathan McCullough (soloist); James Darrah, David T. Little, Lewis Pesacov & John Toia (producers) – Little: Soldier Songs (The Opera Philadelphia Orchestra); Yannick Nézet-Séguin (conductor); Karen Cargill, Isabel Leonard, Karita Mattila, Erin Morley & Adrianne Pieczonka (soloists); David Frost (producer) – Poulenc: Dialogues des Carmélites	
2023	Yannick Nézet-Séguin (conductor); Angel Blue, Will Liverman, Latonia Moore and Walter Russell III (soloists); David Frost (producer)	Blanchard: Fire Shut Up In My Bones	The Metropolitan Opera Orchestra, The Metropolitan Opera Chorus	Yannick Nézet-Séguin (conductor); Barry Banks, Nathan Berg, Joshua Hopkins, Erin Morley & Jakub Józef Orliński (soloists); David Frost (producer) - Aucoin: Eurydice (The Metropolitan Opera Orchestra, The Metropolitan Opera Chorus); Gil Rose (conductor/producer); Joshua Conyers, Ronnita Miller, Whitney Morrison, Victor Robertson & Davóne Tines (soloists) - Davis: X - The Life and Times of Malcolm X (The Boston Modern Orchestra Project; The Odyssey Opera Chorus)	
2024	Yannick Nézet-Séguin (conductor); Ryan Speedo Green, Latonia Moore & Eric Owens (soloists); David Frost (producer)	Blanchard: Champion	The Metropolitan Opera Orchestra; The Metropolitan Opera Chorus	Gil Rose (conductor/producer); Anthony Roth Costanzo, Kathryn Henry, Jarrett Ott & David Portillo (soloists) - Corigliano: The Lord of Cries; Timur (soloist); Andrew McKenna Lee & David T. Little (producers) - Little: Black Lodge	
2025	Esa-Pekka Salonen (conductor); Fleur Barron, Axelle Fanyo, Nicholas Phan & Christopher Purves (soloists); Jason O'Connell (producer)	Saariaho: Adriana Mater	San Francisco Symphony; San Francisco Symphony Chorus; Timo Kurkikangas	John Adams (conductor); Paul Appleby, Julia Bullock, Hye Jung Lee, Daniela Mack, Elliot Madore, Ryan McKinny & Davóne Tines (soloists); Dmitriyi Lipay (producer) - Adams: Girls of the Golden West (Los Angeles Philharmonic; Los Angeles Master Chorale); Yannick Nézet-Seguin (conductor); Mario Chang, Michael Chioldi, Greer Grimsley, Nancy Fabiola Herrera, Mattia Olivieri, Ailyn Pérez & Gabriella Reye (soloists); David Frost (producer) - Catán: Florencia en el Amazonas (The Metropolitan Opera Orchestra; The Metropolitan Opera Chorus); Gerard Schwarz (conductor); Tristan Hallett, Kelly Kaduce & Edward Parks (soloists); Blanton Alspaugh (producer) - Moravec: The Shining (Kansas City Symphony; Lyric Opera of Kansas City Chorus); Yannick Nézet-Seguin (conductor); Joyce DiDonato, Renée Fleming & Kelli O'Hara (soloists); David Frost (producer) - Puts: The Hours (The Metropolitan Opera Orchestra; The Metropolitan Opera Chorus)	
2026	Kwamé Ryan (conductor); Jamie Burton, J'Nai Bridges & Janai Brugger (soloists); Blanton Alspaugh (producer)	Heggie: Intelligence	Houston Grand Opera; Gene Scheer	Carolyn Kuan (conductor); Hannah Cho, Alex DeSocio, Nina Yoshida Nelsen & Brian Vu (soloists); Adam Abeshouse, Silas Brown & Doron Schachter (producers) - Huang Ruo: An American Soldier (American Composers Orchestra; David Henry Hwang); Alan Pierson (conductor); Miriam Khalil, Marc Kudisch, David Adam Moore, Omar Najmi, Naomi Louisa O’Connell & Karim Sulayman (soloists); Mary Kouyoumdjian (producer) - Kouyoumdjian: Adoration (Silvana Quartet; The Choir of Trinity Wall Street); Elaine Kelly (conductor); Oisín Ó Dálaigh, John Molloy & Naomi Louisa O’Connell (soloists); Alex Dowling & Emma O'Halloran (producers) - O'Halloran: Trade & Mary Motorhead (Irish National Opera Orchestra; Mark O'Halloran); Yannick Nézet-Séguin (conductor); Ben Bliss, Emily D’Angelo, Greer Grimsley & Kyle Miller (soloists); David Frost (producer) - Tesori: Grounded (Metropolitan Opera Orchestra, Metropolitan Opera Chorus; George Brant)	
2027	Winner TBA on 7 February 2027			Gianandrea Noseda (conductor); J'Nai Bridges, Susan Graham, Thomas Hampson, Nicole Heaston & Matthew Polenzani (soloists); Blanton Alspaugh (producer) - Barber: Vanessa (National Symphony Orchestra, University of Maryland Concert Choir); Yannick Nézet-Séguin (conductor), Patrick Carfizzi, Craig Colclough, Andrzej Filónczyk, Miles Mykannen, Edward Nelson, Sun-Ly Pierce & Lauren Snouffer (soloists); David Frost (producer) - Bates: The Amazing Adventures of Kavalier & Clay (Metropolitan Opera Orchestra, Metropolitan Opera Chorus, Gene Scheer); Anthony Parnther (conductor); Lacey Jo Benter, Cedric Berry, Ashley Faatoalia, Orson Van Gay, Bernard Holcomb, William Powel III & Justin Ryan (soloists); Greg Curtis, Anthony Davis & Anthony Parnther (producers) - Davis: The Central Park Five (Long Beach Opera, Richard Wesley); Alan Pierson (conductor); Karim Sulayman, Gavin Chuck, Andrew McKenna Lee & David T. Little (producers) - Little: What Belongs to You (Alarm Will Sound); Patrick Summers (conductor); Ryan McKinny & Lauren Snouffer (soloists); Blanton Alspaugh (producer) - Mazzoli: Breaking the Waves (Houston Grand Opera Orchestra, Houston Grand Opera Chorus, Royce Vavrek)	
