= Donnie Ray Albert =

American operatic baritone (born 1950)

Donnie Ray Albert (born January 10, 1950) is an American operatic baritone who has had an active international career since 1976.

== Life and career ==
Born in Baton Rouge, Louisiana, Albert graduated from McKinley Senior High School in 1968. He earned a Bachelor of Music degree from Louisiana State University in 1972. He went on to earn a Master of Music degree from Southern Methodist University where he studied with Thomas Hayward.

Albert made his professional opera debut in May 1975 at the Houston Grand Opera in Scott Joplin's Treemonisha. The following year he returned to that house to sing the role of Jake Wallace in Giacomo Puccini's La Fanciulla del West and portray Porgy to the Bess of Clamma Dale in a highly lauded production of George Gershwin's Porgy and Bess. The production was transported to Broadway in New York City where it ran for a total of 122 performances from September 25, 1976 to January 9, 1977. The production's recording won a Grammy Award for Best Opera Recording. In 1978 he made his debuts at the New York City Opera and the Washington National Opera, and in 1979 he gave his first performance at the Lyric Opera of Chicago.

During the 1980s Albert was highly active with regional opera companies in the United States; with his performance credits including appearances with the Baltimore Opera, Cincinnati Opera, Dallas Opera, Fort Worth Opera, New Orleans Opera, Portland Opera, and Tulsa Opera among others. From 1981-1983 he made several appearances at the Vancouver Opera. In 1982 he made his debut at the Opera Company of Boston and sang at the Palacio de Bellas Artes in Mexico City. In 1984 he sang for the first time at the San Francisco Opera, and that same year sang Porgy for his debut at the Teatro Comunale Florence. He performed for the first time with the Canadian Opera Company in 1986. In 1987 he made his debut at the Michigan Opera Theatre and in 1989 he made his first appearance at the Florentine Opera; both in the role of Porgy. In 1988 he embarked on a major tour of Porgy and Bess in Europe.

In 1996 Albert sang the title role in Richard Wagner's The Flying Dutchman at the Cologne Opera. At La Scala, he has performed the roles of Hidraot in Christoph Willibald Gluck's Armide, and the title role in Verdi's Nabucco. Other roles he has performed on stage include Varlaam in Boris Godunov, Basilio in Rossini's The Barber of Seville, Count Monterone in Verdi's Rigoletto, Don Carlo in Verdi's Ernani, Don Fernando in Beethoven's Fidelio, Escamillo in Georges Bizet's Carmen, Ferrando in Verdi's Il trovatore, Iago in Verdi's Otello, Jack Rance in Giacomo Puccini's La fanciulla del West, Jochanaan in Richard Strauss' Salome, Nourabad in Bizet's Les pêcheurs de perles, Timur in Puccini's Turandot, Valentin in Charles Gounod's Faust, and the title role in Verdi's Nabucco, Trinity Moses in Weill's Rise and Fall of the City of Mahagonny, and the title role in Louis Gruenberg's The Emperor Jones.

Albert has also had an active career as a concert singer. He has sung in concerts with the Chicago Symphony Orchestra, the Los Angeles Philharmonic, the Minnesota Orchestra, the St. Paul Chamber Orchestra, and the New York Philharmonic among others.
