= New Philharmonia Orchestra =

New Philharmonia may refer to:

- the 1964-1977 incarnation of the Philharmonia Orchestra
- the New Philharmonia Orchestra of Massachusetts
