= Karajan: Beethoven Symphonies (1963) =

Beethoven Symphonies (1963)

Studio album by Herbert von Karajan
- Released: 1963
- Recorded: December 1961 – November 1962
- Genre: Classical
- Length: 332:05
- Label: Deutsche Grammophon

Karajan: Beethoven Symphonies (1963) is a set of studio recordings made in 1961 and 1962 by the Berlin Philharmonic conducted by Herbert von Karajan. It is the second of four cycles of Beethoven's nine symphonies that Karajan conducted, and the first of three for the German record label Deutsche Grammophon.

The complete set was first released in 1963 in Europe. As a result, the cycle of symphonies is now generally known as the 1963 cycle. This distinguishes it from a 1977 cycle of nine Beethoven symphonies made by the same combination of orchestra and conductor for the label Deutsche Grammophon and from a subsequent cycle issued using the then-prevailing 16-bit digital recording technology, also for Deutsche Grammophon, in 1984. A fourth audio-visual cycle, issued originally on LaserDisc by Sony Classical, was completed not long before Karajan's death in 1989.

== Background ==
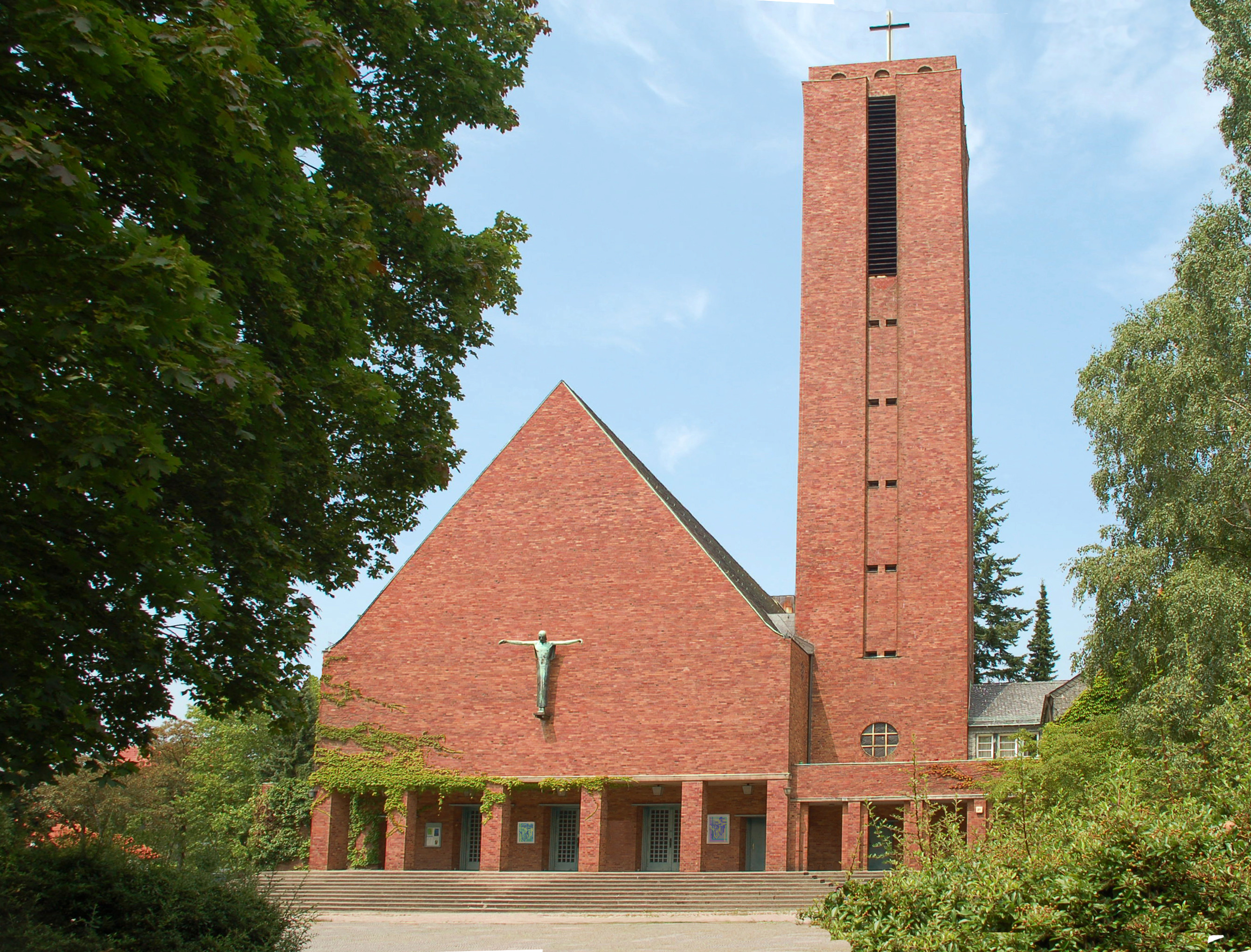
Jesus-Christus-Kirche, Berlin Dahlem

The 1963 complete cycle of Beethoven symphonies remains available in the vinyl, CD and digital download formats. The eight-LP set on release in 1963 in the U.S. retailed for $47.98, when a weekly average salary was $114. A limited edition eight-LP box set of 2000 copies on 180-gram vinyl was released in 2016 retailing for $166.

The cycle is usually now presented across five CDs. It is available in 24-bit/96 kHz high definition sound on six hybrid Super Audio CDs or one Blu-ray audio disc, the latter two also containing a rehearsal session for the ninth symphony. The 1962 cycle has been cited for the particular commitment and driven energy of the playing by the orchestra, which was considered to mark high new standards among European orchestras. Critics cited the interpretation of Karajan as a benchmark in this repertoire.

Recording technology in the genre of orchestral and concerto repertoire had also seen numerous advances in the preceding years, with the advent of tape from the mid-1950s as the medium for recorded music, which facilitated better fidelity and easier editing, together with advances in microphone technology and superior playback technology.

Richard Osborne, music critic and biographer to Herbert von Karajan, cites "astronomical" recording costs in the venture, with a figure of 1.5 million Deutsche Mark expended to make the recordings. Estimates at the time indicate a requirement to sell 100,000 LP boxed sets to recoup the costs. The head of a rival classical music recording company, EMI, suggested that Deutsche Grammophon was "heading for a colossal financial catastrophe".

The executive producer of the set was Deutsche Grammophon's head of artists and repertoire, Elsa Maria Schiller. Each recording in the cycle was engineered by Günter Hermanns, with production by Otto Gerdes (Nos. 1, 2, 8) and Otto Ernst Wohlert (Nos. 3–7, 9). The Jesus-Christus-Kirche in Berlin Dahlem was often used by this label for its studio recordings of this orchestra and conductor during the 1960s until the 1980s.

A figure of one million complete sets sold in the first ten years has been claimed.
