= New Philharmonia =

New Philharmonia may refer to:

- Philharmonia Orchestra in London, known as the New Philharmonia Orchestra from 1964 to 1977
- New Philharmonia Orchestra of Massachusetts
