= Hanne Fischer =

Danish operatic mezzo-soprano

Hanne Fischer (born 3 March 1966 in Copenhagen) is a Danish operatic mezzo-soprano. In 1993 she made her professional opera debut at the Royal Danish Theatre as Cherubino in Wolfgang Amadeus Mozart's The Marriage of Figaro. From 1993 to 1997 she was a member of the Kiel Opera House, and since 1997 she has been a member of the Royal Danish Theatre. She has appeared as a guest artist with numerous theatres, including the Berlin State Opera, the Hamburg State Opera, Theater Bonn, and the Théâtre des Champs-Élysées. Along with her fellow performers, she was nominated for the Grammy Award for Best Opera Recording for her performance in Poul Ruders's The Handmaid's Tale at the 44th Annual Grammy Awards in 2002.
