= Valerie Gross =

German record producer

- Occupation: Record producer
- Notable work: Osvaldo Golijov's Ainadamar

Valerie Gross is a German record producer of classical music. Gross won the 2006 Grammy Award in the category of Best Opera Recording for Osvaldo Golijov's 2006 album Ainadamar.
