= RCA Victor Symphony Orchestra =

The RCA Victor Symphony Orchestra, sometimes also known as the Victor Symphony Orchestra, the RCA Victor Salon Orchestra, the RCA Victor Orchestra or the RCA Orchestra, was an American studio orchestra founded in 1940 by the RCA Victor record label for the purposes of making recordings. The Victor Talking Machine Company had employed a studio orchestra since the days of acoustical recording early in the 20th century. In the 1920s, Victor established the Victor Salon Orchestra based at the company's headquarters in Camden, New Jersey. This group consisted of musicians primarily from nearby Philadelphia and New York City and was created by longtime Victor staff conductor and arranger Nathaniel Shilkret. The name was later used for free-lance orchestras, mainly in New York City, assembled as needed to make recordings for RCA Victor through the early 1960s. Its players were recruited primarily from the New York Philharmonic, the Metropolitan Opera, the NBC Symphony Orchestra, and other major New York ensembles. The RCA Victor Orchestra recorded with several notable conductors including Leonard Bernstein, Kirill Kondrashin, Josef Krips, Dimitri Mitropoulos, Fritz Reiner, William Steinberg and Leopold Stokowski. A number of these recordings received Grammy Awards. The orchestra was disbanded in the early 1960s when RCA Victor began moving much of its Red Seal recording activity to Europe and established the RCA Italiana Orchestra at its studios in Rome.
