= Mark S. Doss =

American opera singer (born 1957)

- Born: July 2, 1957 (age 69) Cleveland, Ohio, United States
- Occupation: Bass-Baritone
- Education: East Technical High School
- Genres: Opera, Concert and Recital
- Notable awards: Grammy Award for Best Opera Recording

Website
- marksdoss.com

Mark Steven Doss (born July 2, 1957, in Cleveland, Ohio) is a Grammy Award-winning African-American bass-baritone, specializing in opera, concert and recital. He has performed major roles with many international opera companies, including Milan's La Scala, Vienna State Opera, Lyric Opera of Chicago, San Francisco Opera, the Royal Opera House Covent Garden, Deutsche Staatsoper Berlin, Brussels' La Monnaie, Canadian Opera Company, and Oper Frankfurt. He divides his time between Toronto, Ontario and Erie, Pennsylvania.

== Early life and education ==
Mark S. Doss was born on July 2, 1957, in Cleveland, Ohio. He attended Cleveland's East Technical High School, where in addition to avid participation in varsity sports he took drama and chorus, and performed in a school production of Godspell. Following high school, and a summer work-study program dedicated to training in the performing arts, he pursued a lifelong ambition to become a Catholic priest, enrolling in the formation program (seminary) at Saint Joseph's College in Rensselaer, Indiana.

While at Saint Joseph's, Doss continued to take music courses and performed in recitals and musical theatre productions. After two years, he left the seminary and became a secular student at the college, graduating with a BA in music and sociology.

After graduating from Saint Joseph's, Doss entered the master's degree program at Indiana University's School of Music (1980–83), studying voice with Walter Cassel and Nicola Rossi-Lemeni. Doss's first operatic performance was in the role of Khan Konchak in the Indiana University Musical Theatre's production of Borodin's Prince Igor. He performed a total of six roles at Indiana University, including that of Mephistopheles in Faust, which he has reprised on several occasions throughout his professional career.

== Career ==
Following an apprenticeship with the Santa Fe Opera in 1983, where he worked with Nico Castel, Thomas Stuart, Martin Katz, and John Fiore, he then became an ensemble member of Chicago's Lyric Opera Center for American Artists. After a two-year stint in Chicago, Doss commenced his professional career in January 1986 as a member of the Metropolitan Opera in New York City.

Since then, Doss has performed at many leading international opera companies, including Lyric Opera of Chicago, the Canadian Opera Company, San Francisco Opera, Brussels' Théâtre de la Monnaie, Deutsche Opera Berlin, Royal Opera House, Covent Garden, Teatro La Fenice, Teatro del Maggio Musicale Fiorentino, Oper Frankfurt, New York City Opera, Deutsche Staatsoper Berlin and Teatro alla Scala.

His roles have included the Title Role in Boito's Mefistofele, Escamillo in Carmen, Mephistopheles in Faust, Zaccaria in Nabucco, Leporello in Don Giovanni, Raimondo in Lucia di Lammermoor, the High Priest in Samson et Dalila, Jaroslav Prus in The Makropulos Case, Jochanaan in Salome, Amonasro in Aida, Mustafa in L’Italiana in Algeri, Thoas in Iphigénie en Tauride, Alidoro in La Cenerentola (Cinderella), Argante in Rinaldo, Scarpia in Tosca, among others. In the course of his career, Doss has performed with operatic artists such as Plácido Domingo, Renée Fleming and Denyce Graves.

Doss made his debut at Milan's La Scala in 2004 in the role of Escamillo in Carmen. Since then, he has been a regular performer at La Scala, most recently in the role Amonasro in the opera's production of Verdi's Aida on July 6, 2009. In 2009, Doss performed the roles of Mephistopheles in Gounod's Faust with Opera Tampa, Amonasro in Verdi's Aida at La Scala and in Tel Aviv (with La Scala on Tour), Jochanaan in Strauss' Salome with the Deutsche Staatsoper Berlin, and Premysl in Janáček's Šárka with La Fenice in Venice.

His 2010 engagements included a tour of Italian opera houses (many being debuts) as Jochanaan in Salome with Florence's Maggio Musicale Fiorentino, the Arena di Verona as Escamillo in Carmen, Balstrode in Peter Grimes with the Teatro Regio di Torino, Jochanaan at Bologna's Teatro Comunale, and Escamillo at the Teatro Municipale di Salerno. Doss had also been contracted for a return performance with the Canadian Opera Company in the fall of 2011.

== Personal life ==
Doss originally began college with aspirations to the Catholic priesthood.

== Awards ==
Doss is the recipient of Planet Africa's 2011 Entertainment Award for his many achievements as a positive role model for youths. In 1993, Doss received a Grammy Award, (Best Opera Recording category) for his performance on the Deutsche Grammophon recording of Handel's Semele, conducted by John Nelson. In 1986 he won First Prize in the International Verdi Competition in Busseto, Italy, as well as being a Metropolitan Opera Finalist Winner that same year. In 1987 he received The National Institute for Music Theatre's George London Opera Prize.

== Teaching ==
Between 1995 and 1997, Doss held the position of associate professor of Voice at Michigan State University in East Lansing, Michigan. He left the post in 1997 to avoid conflicts with his performance schedule. Doss continues to give occasional vocal master classes and to work with apprentice artists engaged with professional opera companies.

== DVDs ==
- Aida (2004, Opus Arte) with La Monnaie (Brussels)
- Salome (2007, Rai Trade) with Teatro alla Scala

== Recordings ==
- Bel Canto Arias, Kathleen Battle (1993, Deutsche Grammophon)
- Semele (1993, Deutsche Grammophon) with Kathleen Battle as Semele, conducted by John Nelson
- Amistad (1998, New World Records), with Lyric Opera of Chicago
- Florencia en el Amazonas (2001, Albany Records), with Houston Grand Opera, conducted by Patrick Summers
- Mefistofele (2004, hr-musik.de), with Oper Frankfurt

== Televised productions ==
- Eugene Onegin (1985 VC #0981) with Lyric Opera of Chicago
- X: The Life and Times (1986 PBS /NET, Guggenheim Museum)
- Rasputin (1988, PBS /NET, Guggenheim Museum)
- Rigoletto ("Live from Lincoln Center", Air Date: 21 September 1988—Season 13, Episode 4) with New York City Opera
- The Magic Flute ("Live from Lincoln Center", Air Date: 14 October 1987—Season 12, Episode 5) with New York City Opera
- L'italiana in Algeri (2000, Radiotelevisione Italiana—RAIDUE) with Teatro Regio Torino
