= Richard Mohr =

American record producer

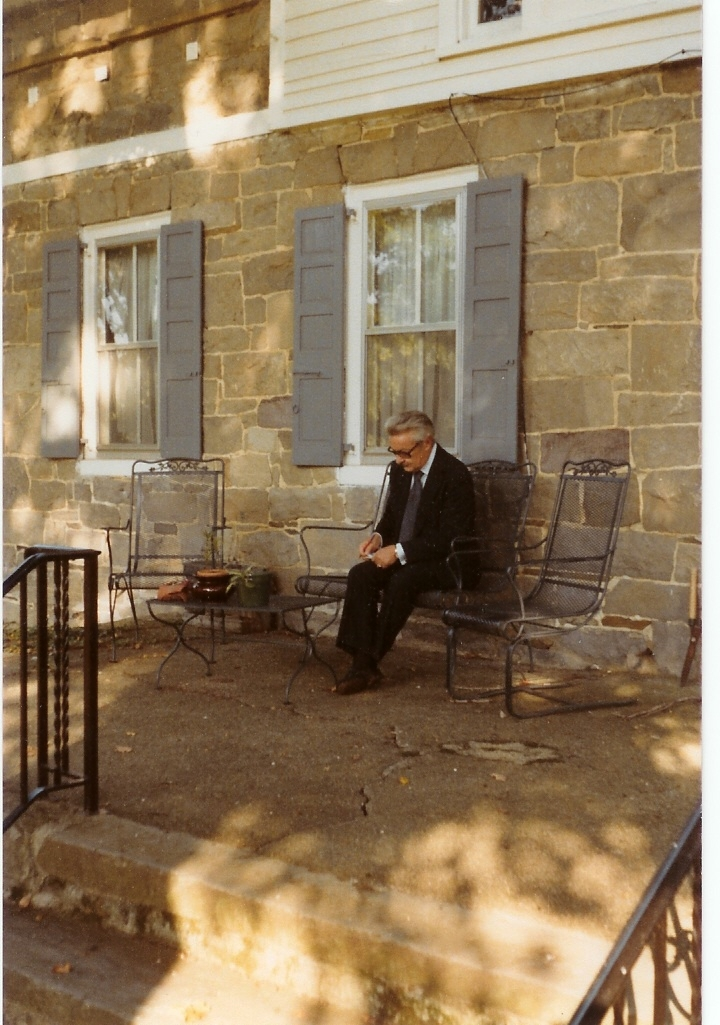
Richard Mohr at home in Blairstown, New Jersey

Richard Mohr (June 13, 1919 – November 23, 2002) was one of RCA Victor’s most prominent producers of classical and operatic music recordings from 1943 through 1977. His producing credits included recording the casts of the world premieres of Samuel Barber's Vanessa and Gian Carlo Menotti's Amahl and the Night Visitors, as well as the first LP recordings of Ernani, Luisa Miller and Lucrezia Borgia and three versions each of Rigoletto, Aida, La Traviata and Il Trovatore. Mohr was born in Springfield, Ohio, and died in West Milford, New Jersey

== Work ==
Mohr's orchestral repertory began with the last of the historical performances of Arturo Toscanini and the NBC Symphony Orchestra and continued over the years with such conductors as Leopold Stokowski, Pierre Monteux, Charles Munch, Fritz Reiner, Arthur Fiedler, Erich Leinsdorf, Tullio Serafin, Jean Morel, Georges Prêtre, Zubin Mehta, James Levine, Georg Solti, Fausto Cleva and Nello Santi, conducting some of the world's most prestigious orchestras, such as The Chicago Symphony Orchestra, The Boston Symphony Orchestra, The Philadelphia Orchestra, The London Philharmonic Orchestra, the New Philharmonia Orchestra, and the London Symphony Orchestra.

The recorded legacy he left behind contains more than 80 complete opera recordings, including the landmark, La Bohème with Victoria de los Angeles and Jussi Bjoerling, conducted by Thomas Beecham. Other operas featured many of the glorious voices of the era including Leontyne Price, Montserrat Caballé, Martina Arroyo, Fiorenza Cossotto, Ruggero Raimondi, Leonard Warren, Risë Stevens, Licia Albanese, Robert Merrill, Roberta Peters, Zinka Milanov, Jan Peerce, Richard Tucker, Fernando Corena, Nan Merriman, Renata Scotto, Rosalind Elias, Shirley Verrett, Anna Moffo, Plácido Domingo, Sherrill Milnes, Carlo Bergonzi, Alfredo Kraus, Giorgio Tozzi, Ezio Flagello, Gabriel Bacquier, Nicolai Gedda, Giuseppe di Stefano, Cesare Valletti, Judith Blegen and Mirella Freni.

== Critics ==
Writing of Mohr, Martin Bernheimer, former music critic of the Los Angeles Times, said: "He had a great eye and ear for talent and for putting important people together for projects that had lasting value to the music lover. He was an enabler with great imagination and great taste. My impression was he got (the artists) to behave like pussycats."

== Awards ==
His body of work earned him five Grammy Awards for Best Opera Recording of the year and at least twenty-five Grammy nominations. He is also widely known for his appearances on the Met Opera Quiz broadcasts as a panelist and later as producer of the Saturday Metropolitan Opera radio broadcast intermission features.
