= Christopher Sayers =

English cricketer

Personal information
- Full name: Christopher Allan Sayers
- Born: 19 December 1978 (age 47); Harrow, London, England
- Batting: Right-handed
- Bowling: Right-arm medium-fast

Domestic team information
- Years: Team
- 1999–2001: Cambridge University
- 2001: Cambridge UCCE

Career statistics
| Competition | First-class |
|---|---|
| Matches | 14 |
| Runs scored | 122 |
| Batting average | 10.16 |
| 100s/50s | –/– |
| Top score | 46 |
| Balls bowled | 498 |
| Wickets | 2 |
| Bowling average | 178.50 |
| 5 wickets in innings | – |
| 10 wickets in match | – |
| Best bowling | 2/21 |
| Catches/stumpings | 8/– |
- Source: Cricinfo, 2 September 2020

Christopher Allan Sayers (born 19 December 1978) is an English former first-class cricketer.

Sayers was born at Harrow in December 1978 and was educated at Millfield, before going up to Trinity Hall, Cambridge. While studying at Cambridge played first-class cricket for Cambridge University, making his debut in 1999 against Nottinghamshire at Trent Bridge. He played first-class cricket for Cambridge University until 2001, making eleven appearances. Playing as an all-rounder, he scored 103 runs in his eleven matches at an average of 11.44, with a high score of 46. He had little success with his right-arm medium-fast bowling, taking just 2 wickets from 83 overs bowled which conceded 357 runs. In 2001, Sayers also played three first-class matches for the then newly formed Cambridge UCCE side, appearing in their inaugural first-class match against Kent. (Note: Cambridge UCCE differed from Cambridge University Cricket Club in that it was open to students at Anglia Ruskin University, whereas Cambridge University Cricket Club is exclusively for students of the constituent colleges of the University of Cambridge.)
