= Christopher Raeburn (producer) =

English record producer

Christopher Raeburn (31 July 1928 in London – 18 February 2009 in Ivinghoe, Buckinghamshire) was an English record producer of international renown.

== Life and career ==
Raeburn was educated at Charterhouse School and Oxford where his contemporaries included Robert Layton, Peter Branscombe and Andrew Porter. Turning down a commission during his National Service, Raeburn was posted to Palestine as a clerk with the Royal Signals. While serving at Tel Litwinsky, he witnessed a terrorist attack on the base's cinema. Always interested in the theatre, he visited many plays, operas and concerts during his posting. On demobbing in 1948, Raeburn travelled across Egypt to Tripoli, returning to England by ship.

At Oxford Raeburn had taken part in drama work, and started his career as a “jack-of-all-trades” at the first Mermaid Theatre in St John's Wood, London, in 1951, including the production of Dido and Aeneas with Kirsten Flagstad and Arda Mandikian. He took a position with Decca Records in 1954. He took a leave of absence from Decca for a Leverhulme Scholarship to do research on Der Schauspieldirektor and other stage works by Mozart in Vienna, and while there became close friends with Haydn scholar H. C. Robbins Landon. He was a Vienna reviewer for Opera magazine (sometimes using a nom de plume) during his time in that city.

Raeburn rejoined Decca Records in 1957 where his first assignment was a recording of arias sung by Virginia Zeani. He worked for Decca for over five decades specialising in producing albums of classical music, and in particular opera. He was on the production team for the first studio recording of Richard Wagner's Ring Cycle with the conductor Georg Solti. His work involved collaborations with internationally renowned artists and several of his recordings won Grammy Awards.

Raeburn worked with Vladimir Ashkenazy and András Schiff, and produced Hans Hotter's last lieder recitals. His last recording was made with Cecilia Bartoli, whom he had signed with Decca in 1986, for her 2007 Decca tribute CD of music associated with Maria Malibran.

Raeburn stated that he always strove to achieve a 'theatrical' atmosphere in the opera recordings that he produced. However, by 1996 he reflected that sometimes there was the concern that people were moving just for the sake of it and that too many stage noises were being added. "Nowadays I want singers to stay centre-stage throughout an aria, not move about. There's no point in starting them half-left and moving them half-right merely to show you can do that. You should use movement for recitative and action but not for arias." In relation to live recording he explained that, "however many performances of a run you record, artists tend to tire at the same places in each. Then you have to have patch sessions, but then it's no longer strictly a live recording". For this reason he preferred optimum studio conditions.

Raeburn's recognitions included the Franz Schalk Gold Medal from the Vienna Philharmonic Orchestra in 1988, the Midem Lifetime Achievement, and Gramophone magazine's Special Achievement Award for his "unswerving honesty, integrity and expertise".

Raeburn took speaking parts (under the pseudonym Omar Godknow) in the audio recordings of Giuditta, Die Fledermaus and Il segreto di Susanna which he produced.

He was twice married and divorced; the godparents of his three daughters were Leontyne Price, Tom Krause and Marilyn Horne.

== See also ==
- Mozart: Le nozze di Figaro (Herbert von Karajan recording)
- Mozart: Le nozze di Figaro (Georg Solti recording)
