= Clamma Dale =

American operatic soprano

- Born: Clamma Churita Dale; 1948 (age 77–78); Chester, Pennsylvania, U.S.
- Education: Juilliard School (BM, MM)
- Spouse: Terry Shirk (m. 1981; died 1987)

Clamma Churita Dale (born 1948) is an American operatic soprano. She portrayed "Bess" in the highly successful 1976 Houston Grand Opera production of Porgy and Bess. The show was transferred from Houston to Broadway and Dale was awarded a 1977 Drama Desk Award for Best Actress in a musical and received a Tony Award nomination. She won a Grammy award in 1978 for Best Opera Recording of the Porgy & Bess soundtrack.

== Early life and education ==
Dale was born and raised in Chester, Pennsylvania. Her father was a jazz musician and she received much of her early musical training from him, playing the clarinet, cello, saxophone, piano, and guitar during her youth as well as singing in the school choir. She studied music at the Settlement Music School earned a bachelor's degree in music from the Juilliard School in 1970. She earned her master's degree from the Juilliard School in 1975.

== Career ==
After graduating from school, Dale worked as a first grade music teacher in Brooklyn until her singing career began to take off.

Dale made her professional opera debut on February 20, 1973 as St. Teresa I in Virgil Thomson's Four Saints in Three Acts at the Vivian Beaumont Theater in a production mounted by the Metropolitan Opera. In 1974 she portrayed Bess for the first time at the Los Angeles Civic Light Opera. In 1975 she won the Walter W. Naumburg Foundation's music competition which led to her New York City recital debut at Town Hall in May 1976. She returned to the NYCO several times in the late 1970s to portray such roles as the Countess in The Marriage of Figaro, and Nedda in Leoncavallo's Pagliacci. In 1975 she signed a three-year contract with the New York City Opera (NYCO) and made her NYCO debut in October 1975 as Antonia in Jacques Offenbach's Les Contes d'Hoffmann. She returned to the NYCO several times in the late 1970s to portray such roles as the Countess in The Marriage of Figaro, and Nedda in Leoncavallo's Pagliacci.

Dale first drew wide acclaim in 1976 for her portrayal of "Bess" in Porgy and Bess with the Houston Grand Opera, a production which went on to a highly successful run at first the Uris Theatre and then the Mark Hellinger Theatre on Broadway in 1976 and 1977. She won the 1977 Drama Desk Award for Outstanding Actress in a musical and a Tony nomination. She won an In 1977 she performed as a soloist with the New York Philharmonic in the premiere of Leonard Bernstein's Songfest in Washington D.C. In 1978, she won a Grammy Award for best Opera Performance for the Porgy & Bess soundtrack.

In 1980, she sang at a gala concert celebrating the 35th anniversary of the United Nations. Later that year, she sang the roles of Giulietta and Antonia in Les Contes d'Hoffmann for her debut at the Opéra national du Rhin, Nedda for her debut with the Opera Company of Philadelphia, and both the title role in Aida and Leonora in Il Trovatore at the opera house in Bogotá, Colombia.

In 1983, Dale made her first appearance at the Opéra National de Paris as Fata Morgana in The Love for Three Oranges. She spent the next several years working in various opera houses in Paris, singing roles like Liu in Puccini's Turandot, Musetta in Puccini's La bohème, Pamina in The Magic Flute, and the one-woman tour de force of the bloodthirsty title character in Erzsebet, an opera by Charles Chaynes.

In 1986, she appeared at the Opéra de Nancy et de Lorraine (now the Opéra national de Lorraine). In 1988 she sang Bess for her debut at the Theater des Westens in Berlin. The following year she portrayed Liu at the Deutsche Oper Berlin. She has given many recitals including two resulting from winning the Walter W. Naumburg voice competition. She gave recitals at Alice Tully Hall and Carnegie Hall among other places. She appeared at the White House in a Gershwin evening on February 12, 1978, with pianist Neil Stannard. In 1991, she sang the world premiere of John Duffy's Time for Remembrance with the Honolulu Symphony for the commemoration of the 50th anniversary of the attack on Pearl Harbor.

== Personal life ==
Dale married Terry Shirk in 1981. He died suddenly of a heart attack in 1987.

== Recordings ==
- Porgy and Bess with the Houston Grand Opera, 1990 RCA Victor.
- Virgil Thomson's Four Saints in Three Acts, 1992 Nonesuch.
- Voice Of Bernstein, 2005 Deutsche Grammophon.
