= Peter Hoare (tenor) =

British tenor (born 1961)

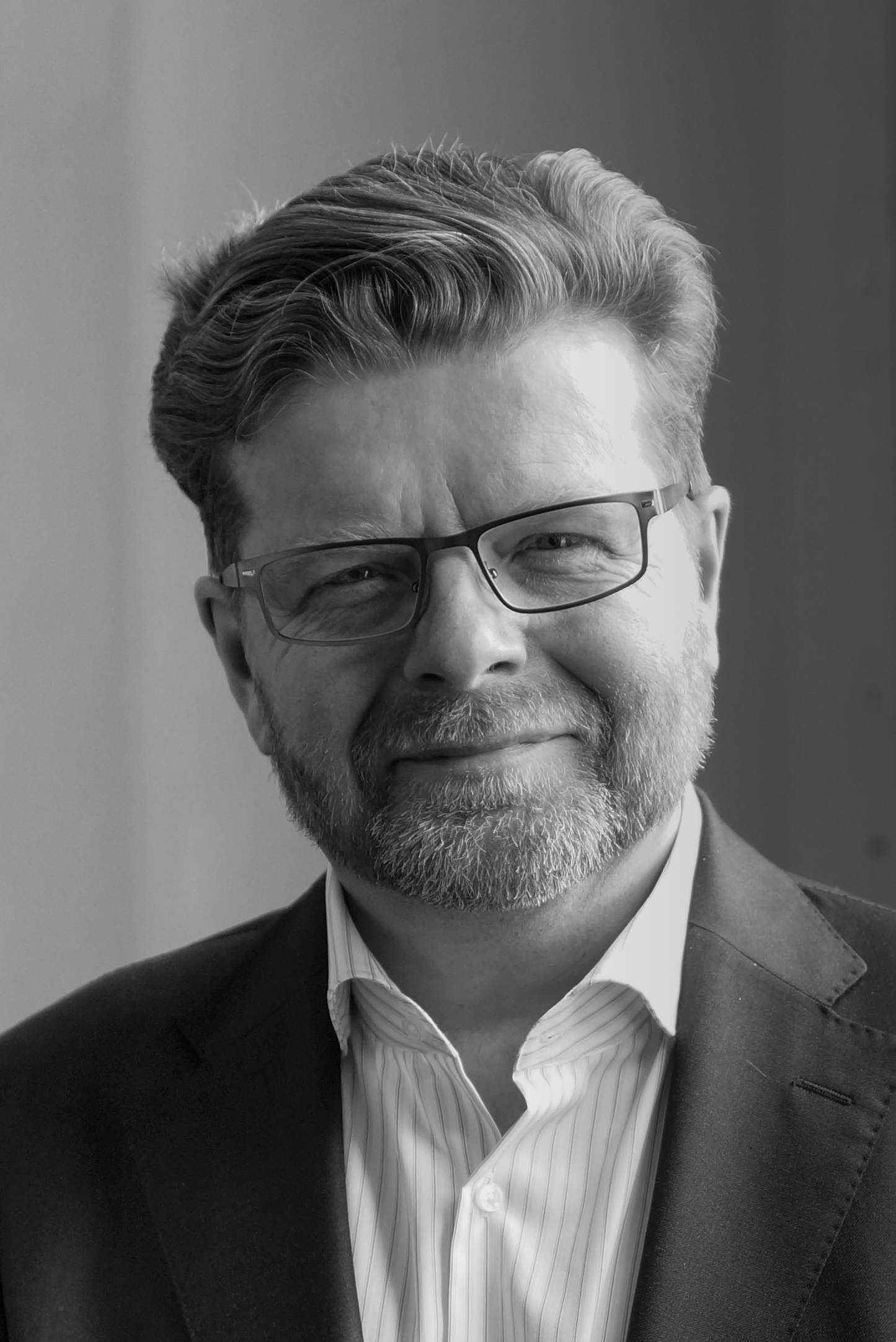
- Hoare in 2018
- Born: 17 October 1961 (age 64); Bradford, West Yorkshire, England
- Education: Huddersfield School of Music; Goldsmiths, University of London
- Occupations: Tenor; music educator
- Years active: 1986–present
- Musical career
- Genres: Opera

Peter Hoare (born 17 October 1961 in Bradford, England) is a British tenor, best known for his opera stage performances.

== Career ==
Peter Hoare learned music initially as a percussionist, gaining a place at the Huddersfield School of Music in 1979 and then Goldsmiths, London, in 1982. After graduating from Goldsmiths in 1983, he taught percussion for Bedfordshire County Council and was Head of Performing Arts at Harrow College of Higher Education in 1986/87, and playing professionally with The Hallé and the Manchester Camerata. By then, singing was beginning to take over his musical interests, and he soon joined the Welsh National Opera.

Although he has performed many operas from the classical canon, he has made his name with his performances of 20th-century and contemporary opera. His Metropolitan Opera debut was in Janáček's From the House of the Dead; he also played the Captain in the Met's Wozzeck, and he took the lead role in Schreker's opera Die Gezeichneten at the Komische Oper Berlin. He played Michel in Martinů's opera Julietta for the English National Opera (ENO); his roles in Britten's Peter Grimes and Billy Budd include both Bob Boles (La Scala) and Captain Vere, for the Norwegian National Opera and Ballet (the opera's Norwegian premiere). He roled as the talk-show host Larry King in the premiere of Mark-Anthony Turnage's Anna Nicole, and created the part of Mortimer in George Benjamin's Lessons in Love and Violence, both for the Royal Opera House. For the ENO, he sang Sharikov in Alexander Raskatov's A Dog's Heart.

As part of World War I commemorations, Hoare premiered Torsten Rasch's A Foreign Field, based on English and German war poetry.

== Recordings ==
Hoare has recorded several operas, including Lessons in Love and Violence, Káťa Kabanová, and James MacMillan's The Sacrifice. He has also recorded Vaughan Williams's Fantasia on Christmas Carols and Delius's A Song of the High Hills.
