= Kurt Rydl =

Austrian operatic bass (born 1947)

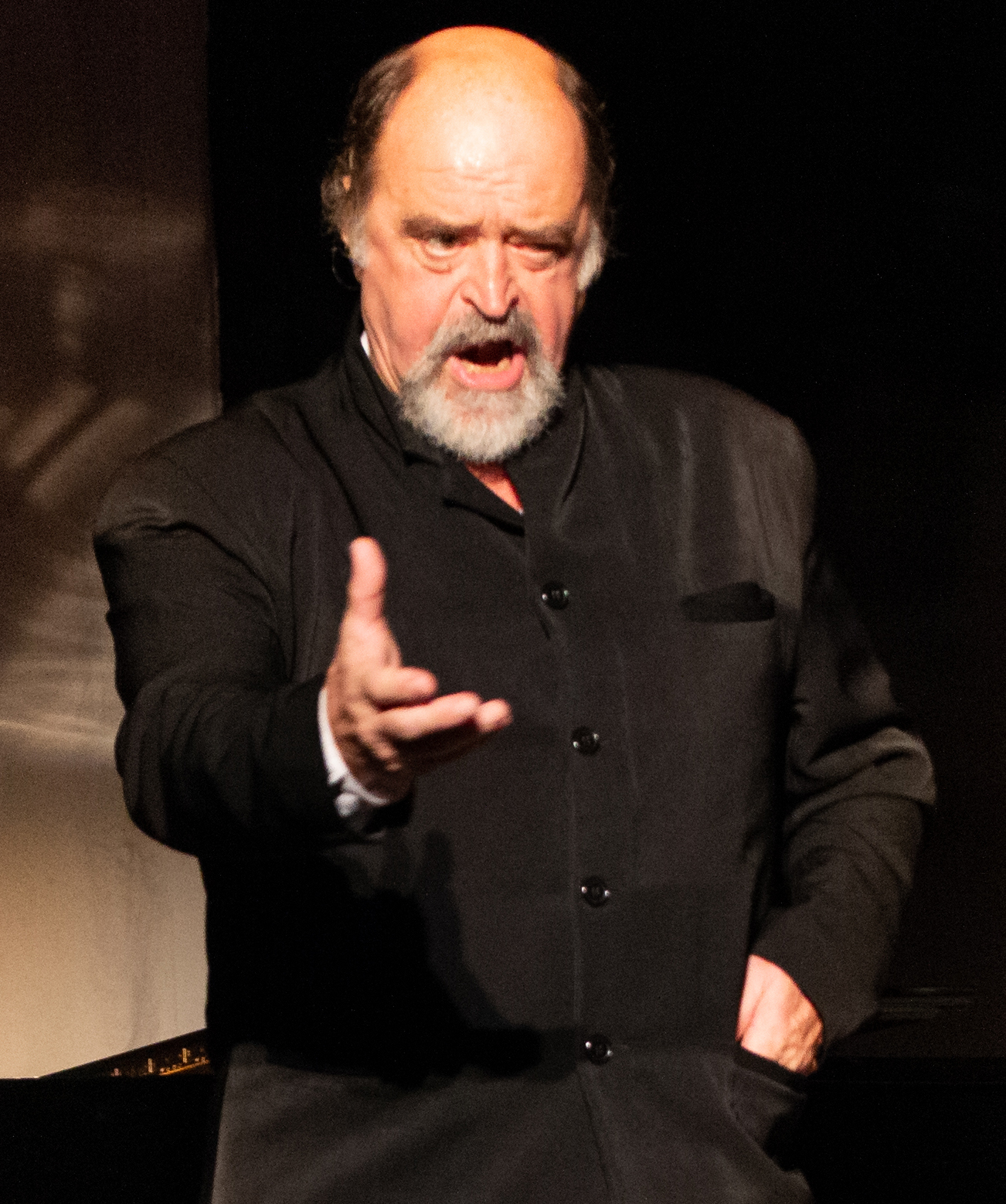
Kurt Rydl, 2019

Kurt Rydl (born October 8, 1947) is an Austrian operatic bass (basso profondo).

== Biography ==
Rydl studied at the Vienna Academy of Music and the Moscow Conservatory. He has won many prizes at several competitions. Rydl is a guest on many major festivals, including in Bayreuth, Schwetzingen, Salzburg, Bregenz, Florence, Verona, Munich and Glyndebourne. His opera repertoire includes more than 80 roles in German, Italian, French, Russian and Czech works, most notably his bass coloratura role as Osmin in Mozart's Die Entführung aus dem Serail. His concert repertoire ranges from Mozart to Penderecki, and from Beethoven to Mahler.

He debuted in 1976 at the Vienna State Opera as Ferrando (Il trovatore). From there he went on to sing Colline (La bohème), Pimen (Boris Godunov), Grand Inquisitor (Don Carlo), Commendatore (Don Giovanni), Osmin (Die Entführung aus dem Serail), Rocco (Fidelio), Daland (The Flying Dutchman), Roger (Jérusalem), King Henry (Lohengrin), Raimondo (Lucia di Lammermoor), Geronte (Manon Lescaut), Talbot (Maria Stuarda), Veit Pogner (Die Meistersinger von Nürnberg), Bartolo (The Barber of Seville), Titurel and Gurnemanz (Parsifal), Sparafucile (Rigoletto), Fasolt (Das Rheingold), Hunding (Die Walküre), Fafner (Siegfried), Hagen (Götterdämmerung), Ochs (Der Rosenkavalier) Morosus (Die schweigsame Frau), Landgraf (Tannhäuser), Claggart (Billy Budd) and Sarastro (The Magic Flute).

Rydl studied in the U.S. as an exchange student and is fluent in English.

In 1996 he was named Austrian Kammersänger, and in 1999 he became an honorary member of the Vienna State Opera. Rydl received the Austrian Cross of Honour for Science and Art, 1st class in 2001.

In 2016 he was awarded the Grand Prix de la Culture in Vienna on the occasion of his 40th anniversary with the Vienna State Opera.
