= David Daniels (conductor) =

American conductor (1933–2020)

- Born: December 20, 1933; Penn Yan, New York
- Died: April 24, 2020 (aged 86); Rochester Hills, Michigan
- Occupation: Conductor
- Notable work: Daniels' Orchestral Music

David Wilder Daniels (December 20, 1933 – April 24, 2020) was an American conductor and author.

== Education ==
His education includes a preparatory department diploma from the Eastman School of Music, an AB degree from Oberlin College, an MA (musicology) from Boston University, and an MFA (organ) and a PhD (orchestral literature and conducting) from the University of Iowa. He spent two summers studying at Tanglewood, and another two with Richard Lert at the Institute for Orchestral Studies.

== Conducting career ==
Daniels was Music Director of the Warren Symphony Orchestra (Michigan) from its inception in 1974 until his retirement in 2010. He was Professor Emeritus at Oakland University, where he taught for 28 years, six of them as chair of the Department of Music, Theatre and Dance. He retired from Oakland University in 1997, and to honor him the orchestra named the annual young artists concert the "David Daniels Young Artists Concert."

Daniels also conducted opera in Boston for a dozen years, where his performances were five times named “Best Opera of the Year” by the Boston Globe. Other guest conducting includes the Detroit Symphony Orchestra, the Detroit Symphony Civic Orchestra, Michigan Opera Theatre, Ann Arbor Ballet Theatre, Detroit Chamber Winds & Strings, Meadow Brook Festival Orchestra, and the Orquesta Sinfonia de Maracaibo, Venezuela.

He has taught at various colleges and universities, including the University of Redlands and Knox College, and was music librarian of the Berkshire Athenaeum in Pittsfield, Massachusetts.

== Achievements ==
David Daniels is the author of Daniels' Orchestral Music (1st-5th ed. 1972-2015, Rowman & Littlefield), a reference book for orchestra professionals. A second book, with coauthor John Yaffé, is Arias, Ensembles, & Choruses: An Excerpt-Finder for Orchestras (2012). Daniels also was a series editor for Rowman & Littlefield (2009-2015).

In 2016, he was given a Lifetime Achievement Award by the College Orchestra Directors Association (CODA).
