= Brian Couzens =

British music executive (1933–2015)

Brian William Couzens (17 January 1933 – 17 April 2015) was a British music industry executive, recording engineer, and producer. He founded Chandos Records in 1979.

== Biography ==
Born in Southend-on-Sea, Couzens was the son of Vera and William Couzens. His father worked for the Ford Motor Company in engine research, and his grandfather was a department store owner. He taught himself the trombone as a youth, performed in dance bands, and did his national service in the Royal Air Force band.

Couzens arranged music for EMI and the BBC, including work for the latter's programme Friday Night is Music Night. His skills at arrangements came to the attention of Ron Goodwin, who hired Couzens to arrange one of his own film scores. The two subsequently collaborated on cinema scores over a period of about 10 years and over 30 films on scores, including such films as 633 Squadron (1964), Those Magnificent Men in Their Flying Machines (1965) and Where Eagles Dare (1968). Some of his light music compositions, such as Exotica and Holiday Highway as performed by the Stuttgart Studio Orchestra, became staples of the BBC's Test Card transmission music repertoire.

During this period, Couzens had founded his publishing house Chandos, which had a particular focus on music for brass bands. With newly gained experience from his film work, he expanded Chandos into an engineering and recording firm, with a mobile studio. As a freelance producer, he engineered recordings for labels such as RCA, recruiting his son Ralph into the business when the latter was age 16. In 1979, after the termination of his contract with RCA, Couzens formed Chandos Records as an independent record label, with his son as engineer and Janet Osbourne as designer. Chandos had hoped to distribute their recordings through EMI, but this arrangement did not come to fruition, which forced Couzens father and son to sell their records directly themselves across the UK. He made Chandos one of the earliest independent record labels to use digital recording technology in the early 1980s. In 2004, Couzens transferred day-to-day production duties to Ralph Couzens, and took the titles of chairman and senior producer for the label.

Couzens received an honorary doctorate from the University of East Anglia in 2007, and a 'Special Achievement' honour from Gramophone in 2010.

Couzens was married twice. His first marriage, to Isle Hauguth in 1956, lasted until her death in 2005, and produced four children, Ralph, Mark, Philip, and Isabella. His second marriage was to Deborah Frogel, in 2006. His four children and his second wife survive him.
