= Gary Lakes =

American operatic heldentenor (1950–2025)

- Born: September 26, 1950; Woodward, Oklahoma, U.S.
- Died: November 11, 2025 (aged 75); Pittsburgh, Pennsylvania, U.S.
- Education: Southern Methodist University
- Occupation: Operatic heldentenor
- Years active: 1981–1999

Gary Lakes (September 26, 1950 – November 11, 2025) was an American operatic heldentenor.

== Life and career ==
Lakes was born in Woodward, Oklahoma, and raised in Irving, Texas. He was a high school football defensive tackle but switched his career aspirations to singing after a cracked vertebra derailed any hope for a football career. He was a fellow of the Music Academy of the West, which he attended in 1977. After attending Southern Methodist University, where he studied with Thomas Hayward, he made his professional debut with the Seattle Opera in the role of Froh in 1981 in Wagner's Das Rheingold. He debuted with the Metropolitan Opera on February 4, 1986, as the High Priest in Mozart's Idomeneo and soon after sang the ensemble role of Walther von der Vogelweide in Wagner's Tannhäuser. In 1987, he sang the role of Siegmund in Wagner's Die Walküre with the Met. He sang the role of Siegmund on both the Met's DVD and CD of Die Walküre opposite Jessye Norman as Sieglinde with James Levine conducting. Other roles he sang at the Met include Don José in Bizet's Carmen, Samson in Saint-Saëns' Samson et Dalila, the Emperor in Strauss' Die Frau ohne Schatten, Erik in Wagner's Der fliegende Holländer, Grigory in Mussorgsky's Boris Godunov, Florestan in Beethoven's Fidelio, the title role in Wagner's Parsifal, Laca in Janáček's Jenůfa, Aeneas in Berlioz' Les Troyens and Jimmy Mahoney in Weill's Rise and Fall of the City of Mahagonny.

Other Wagner roles he sang at various opera houses include Tristan in Tristan und Isolde, Siegfried in Götterdämmerung and the title roles in Tannhäuser and Lohengrin. Other roles included Admete in Gluck's Alceste, Herod in Strauss' Salome, the title role in Berlioz' La damnation de Faust and concert performances of Beethoven's Ninth Symphony and Gustav Mahler's Lied von der Erde. Besides Siegmund, he recorded the roles of Bacchus in Strauss' Ariadne auf Naxos and Aeneas in Les Troyens, and also albums of Irish songs and ballads (in English). He appeared on The Tonight Show with Jay Leno on January 14, 1993.

Lakes died in Pittsburgh, Pennsylvania, on November 11, 2025, at the age of 75.
