= John Willan =

English cricketer (1799–1869)

John James Willan (1799 – 15 September 1869) was an English amateur cricketer who played from 1819 to 1830. He was mainly associated with Hampshire and with Marylebone Cricket Club (MCC), of which he was a member. He made 13 known appearances in important matches.

Willan was educated at Eton before being admitted to St John's College, Cambridge in 1817. Although he apparently only kept two terms at the university, he played for Cambridge University Cricket Club in its inaugural important match in 1819.

== Bibliography ==
- Haygarth, Arthur (1996) [1862]. Scores & Biographies, Volume 1 (1744–1826). Kennington: Frederick Lillywhite. ISBN 978-19-00592-23-9.
- Haygarth, Arthur (1997) [1862]. Scores & Biographies, Volume 2 (1827–1840). Kennington: Frederick Lillywhite. ISBN 978-19-00592-23-9.
