= Johannes Mannov =

Danish baritone singer and clinical audiologist (born 1960)

Johannes Mannov (born Copenhagen, Denmark) is a Danish baritone singer.

== Personal ==
Mannov is a former opera singer, now working as a clinical audiologist in the Copenhagen metropolitan area. Mannov is the son of Børge Christian Mannov, who was a PR consultant and founder of Mannov Consult, and Else Mannov. He is been married to Adrienne Mannov(née Sharp) with whom he has two children, Emil and Ella.

He studied singing with Aldo Baldin and Hans Hotter in Germany. From 2020 to 2023 he studied audiology at the University of Southern Denmark, earning a BA degree in audiology in June 2023.

He currently lives and works in Copenhagen.

=== Singing ===
Mannov has performed internationally, including at the Royal Opera, London at Covent Garden and The Megaron Opera in Athens.

=== Teaching ===
Mannov was a guest professor at the UdK in Berlin. He also taught voice at the Danish National Academy of Music and from 2010 - 2020 had a professorship at the Hochschule für Musik in Nürnberg, Germany.

== Discography ==
1. Holger Danske (opera composed by F.L.Ae. Kunzen), on Dacapo records.
1. Die Tageszeiten (Cantata by Georg Philipp Telemann) on Deutsche Harmonia Mundi
