= Otto Gerdes =

German producer and conductor (1920–1989)

Otto Gerdes (born 20 January 1920 in Cologne; died 15 June 1989) was a German conductor and record producer.

He studied music at the Hochschule für Musik Köln, including conducting with Hermann Abendroth. He conducted opera in Berlin, Dresden, Koblenz, Leipzig, and Munich. He also conducted the radio orchestras of Baden-Baden and Cologne and led concerts with the Sächsische Staatskapelle Dresden. In 1956 he became a record producer for Deutsche Grammophon and in 1963 the label's artistic director. His conducting for that label began when he filled in for an ailing conductor, recording excerpts from the opera Eugene Onegin.

He was dismissed at Deutsche Grammophon in the mid-1960s. The incident that led to his dismissal was recounted in Richard Osborne's 1998 biography of Herbert von Karajan. Gerdes, fresh from a conducting assignment, addressed Karajan as one conductor to another with a "Herr Kollege" (my dear colleague).

Gerdes conducted several works for record including the Prelude to Act 1 of Wagner's Die Meistersinger, a complete Tannhäuser (Dresden version) as well as Wagner's rarely recorded Symphony in C major. He also conducted a recording of the Brahms 4th Symphony.

Included in Gerdes's awards as a producer is a Grammy Award for Best Opera Recording for Wagner's Siegfried conducted by Karajan with the Berlin Philharmonic (1969).
