= Johan Reuter =

Danish baritone and opera singer (born 1969)

Johan Reuter (born 1969) is a Danish baritone and opera singer.

== Life and work ==
Reuter was born in Copenhagen. He studied at the Royal Danish Academy of Music and at the Royal Danish Opera Academy. He has been a member of the ensemble at the Royal Danish Opera since 1996.

His principal appearances at the Royal Danish Opera are the Mozart roles Leporello and Don Giovanni in Don Giovanni, Figaro in Le nozze di Figaro, Papageno in Die Zauberflöte and Guglielmo in Così fan tutte, the Verdi roles Posa in Don Carlo and the title roles in Macbeth and Simon Boccanegra, Alex Bloch in Frandsen's I-K-O-N™, Mandryka in Strauss' Arabella, Henrik in Carl Nielsen's Maskarade, the title role in Philip Glass’ Orphée, Wotan in Wagner's Das Rheingold, Tomsky in Tchaikovsky's Pique dame, Olivier in Strauss’ Capriccio, Struensee in Holten's The Visit of the Royal Physician, Escamillo in Bizet's Carmen, Dr. Needlemeier in Sawer's Skin Deep and the title role in Mussorgsky's Boris Godunov.

Reuter has appeared at the Wagner Festival in Bayreuth, the Salzburg Festival, Wiener Staatsoper, Theater an der Wien, Deutsche Oper in Berlin, Covent Garden in London, Opéra national de Paris (Bastille) in Paris and the operas of Lisbon, Madrid, Zurich, Hamburg, Frankfurt, Essen, and Stuttgart. At these stages he has performed roles such as the title role in Berg's Wozzeck, the title role in Wagner's Der fliegende Holländer, Orest in Strauss' Elektra, Nick Shadow in Stravinsky's The Rake’s Progress, Jochanaan in Strauss' Salome, Barak in Strauss’ Die Frau ohne Schatten, Theseus in Birtwistle's The Minotaur, Der Wanderer in Wagner's Siegfried. He also sang the role of Theseus in Harrison Birtwistle's opera The Minotaur

Reuter has performed at festivals and in concert halls across Europe, including the Bregenz Festival, Maggio Musicale in Florence and the BBC Proms in London, Concertgebouw in Amsterdam, Berliner Philharmonie, and Palais des Beaux Arts in Brussels.

Scheduled are debuts at Gran Teatre de Liceu in Barcelona, Bayerische Staatsoper in Munich and the Metropolitan in New York.

Reuter has released a host of CDs, including recordings of Kunzen's Holger Danske, Carl Nielsen's Maskarade, Schubert's Winterreise (in Danish), Rare Verdi with rare Verdi arias, and a CD with lieder by Richard Strauss, Nielsen and Børresen. He furthermore appears on a number of DVDs, including The Copenhagen Ring, Bo Holten's The Visit of the Royal Physician, Mozart's Zaïde and Birtwistle's The Minotaur.

Reuter was awarded the Order of the Dannebrog in 2005.

.
