= Ľuba Orgonášová =

Slovak operatic soprano (born 1961)

Ľubica "Ľuba" Orgonášová ( [ˈʎuba ˈorgonaːʃovaː] born 22 January 1961) is a Slovak operatic soprano, who is particularly known for her interpretation of Mozart roles.

Born in Bratislava, Slovakia to economist and secretary parents who love music and were supportive of her talents, Orgonasova studied voice and piano at the Music Conservatory and Music Academy. She sang as a soloist at the State Opera in Banská Bystrica before moving to Germany in 1983 to become a member of the Hagen Opera House, where she remained until 1988.

The outstanding quality of her voice was quickly recognised and she was soon engaged in operas and concerts all over Europe. She made her debut at the Vienna Volksoper in 1988, singing Donna Anna and in 1992 at the Vienna State Opera singing Konstanze and Pamina, roles she repeated at the festivals of Aix-en-Provence and Salzburg. She sang Konstanze for her debut at the Opéra de Paris, a role she also recorded to great acclaim with John Eliot Gardiner. Her debut role at the Royal Opera House in London, was Aspasia. Other notable Mozart roles include Giunia, Fiordiligi, Ilia. She also won considerable acclaim in George Frideric Handel's operas such as Alcina and Rinaldo.

Her wide repertory also embraced Marzelline, Agathe, Amina, Lucia, Luisa, Gilda, Violetta, Mimi, Liù, Marguerite, Micaela, Antonia, etc., in all of which one can appreciate her voice and her coloratura technique.

Orgonášová can be heard in several important recordings, notably an early recital Favorite Soprano Arias, a complete La bohème and a La sonnambula recorded live at the Concertgebouw under Alberto Zedda, all with Naxos Records. She also recorded Der Freischütz with the Berlin Philharmonic under Nikolaus Harnoncourt and versions for Archiv Produktion of Mozart's Die Entführung aus dem Serail and Don Giovanni. Her version of Verdi's Requiem with John Eliot Gardiner was the first recorded with period instruments. She has also made important recordings of Britten's War Requiem with Gardiner, Beethoven's Missa Solemnis with both Colin Davis and David Zinman and Schubert masses with Harnoncourt. She recorded the role of Armida in Handel's Rinaldo with Christopher Hogwood and Cecilia Bartoli. Early in her career she recorded Pamina for Erato under Armin Jordan. Her recording of Rossini's Stabat Mater with the Vienna Philharmonic and Myung-whun Chung is considered the finest ever. She enjoys reading and walking in the calm woods surrounding her home near Zurich, Switzerland. In the past few years she has focused mostly on recitals rather than operatic performances.

She sang the aria, "Chi il bel sogno di Doretta?", from La rondine by Giacomo Puccini, over the closing credits of in "Irregular Around the Margins," the fifty-seventh episode of the HBO original series The Sopranos.

== Sources ==
- Grove Music Online, John Allison, Oxford University Press, 2008.
- Favorite Soprano Arias, Keith Anderson, Naxos Records, 1991.
- Ľubica Orgonášová: Plakať nie je môj štýl, Alena Horváthová-Čisáriková, Slovenka 04.11.2010.
