= RCA Italiana Orchestra =

The RCA Italiana Orchestra was an Italian studio orchestra formed by the American record label RCA Victor during the early 1960s. The orchestra was formed as a replacement for the RCA Victor Symphony Orchestra when RCA moved most of its Red Seal recording sessions to Europe for reasons of economy. The orchestra was largely made up of members from the Rome Opera House orchestra and was available for RCA Victor recording sessions only during the opera's off-season. This arrangement enabled RCA Victor to have an orchestra available for recordings without the expense of maintaining a full-time ensemble. A number of the orchestra's recordings were nominated for or received Grammy Awards.
