= Henriette Bonde-Hansen =

Danish operatic soprano (born 1963)

Henriette Bonde-Hansen (born 1963) is a Danish operatic soprano who made her début at Den Jyske Opera in Aarhus in 1993. She has performed at opera houses throughout Europe as well as in Canada and South America.

== Biography ==
Born on 3 September 1963 in Rudme near Ringe on the island of Funen, Bonde-Hansen studied at the Royal Danish Academy of Music in Copenhagen. She in 1993 from the Opera Academy (Operaakademiet). She made her début the same year as Adèle in Die Fledermaus. Key performances include roles in The Marriage of Figaro and Don Giovanni at the Royal Danish Theatre. She has also played Marzelline in Fidelio, Gilda in Rigoletto and Juliette in Roméo et Juliette.

Her concert repertoire includes Brahms' Ein Deutsches Requiem, Liszt's Christus and Debussy's Pelleäs et Melisande. In the 2015-16 season, she performed as a soloist with the Danish Radio Symphony Orchestra.

In 2014, Bonde-Hansen was awarded the Reumert prize for singer of the year.

She is married to the Cuban tenor Reinaldo Marcias.
