= New Philharmonia Orchestra of Massachusetts =

Orchestra based in Newton, Massachusetts, U.S.

- Orchestra
- Founded: 1995; 31 years ago
- Location: Newton, Massachusetts, U.S.
- Concert hall: First Baptist Church in Newton; Mission Church
- Website: www.newphil.org

The New Philharmonia Orchestra of Massachusetts, or the New Phil for short, is a 75-member mostly non-professional regional orchestra based in Newton, Massachusetts, U.S. It was founded in 1995. The New Phil performs in at the First Baptist Church in Newton, and on occasion at Mission Church in Boston's Roxbury neighborhood, as well as other locations in the region.

== History ==
The founding music director of the orchestra was Ronald Knudsen, a violinist in the Boston Symphony Orchestra since 1965 and occasional guest conductor of the Boston Pops Orchestra. After Knudsen's death in March 2015, Francisco Noya stepped in to conduct the final concert of the 2014–2015 season, served as principal conductor and musical advisor for the 2015–2016 season, and was appointed as the orchestra's second music director in 2016. Noya is the resident conductor of the Rhode Island Philharmonic Orchestra and music director of the Berklee Contemporary Symphony Orchestra — and, like Knudsen, has often guest-conducted the Boston Pops.

The orchestra's inaugural season featured a guest conducting appearance by Keith Lockhart, conductor of the Boston Pops. Its fifteenth season was launched on July 1, 2009, with a concert in Boston's Symphony Hall, featuring French music for organ and orchestra, with James David Christie (organist of the Boston Symphony) as soloist. The concert marked the opening night of the New England convention of the American Guild of Organists. On September 14, 2018, the orchestra presented a sold-out concert at Symphony Hall featuring the Indigo Girls.

== Programs ==
The orchestra's programs include a mix of familiar and unfamiliar classical repertoire (including collaborations with local choruses), as well as new music, including commissions. In 2005, the New Philharmonia participated in the Made in America' commission from noted American composer Joan Tower, and premiered a number of other pieces by local composers. The 2009-2010 season included the Boston-area premiere of blue cathedral by Jennifer Higdon. The 2005-2006 concert series included a performance of Mahler's second symphony, and the 2015-2016 concluded with a performance of Beethoven's Choral Fantasy.

The motto of the orchestra is Music for All. In that spirit, the orchestra conducts active outreach programs in the Boston public schools and has strong links to other local school systems and civic organizations. The 2007-2008 season concluded with a benefit concert at the Kennedy Library attended by the mayor of Boston, Thomas Menino, honoring the orchestra's partnership with John Hancock financial services. Under this partnership, members of the orchestra have been offering supplemental music education programs in the Oliver H. Perry elementary school in South Boston.

The New Philharmonia Orchestra is a member of the American Symphony Orchestra League and the New England Orchestra Consortium.

== Notable soloists ==
Eminent soloists who have performed with the orchestra include:

- the flutist Eugenia Zukerman
- violinists James Oliver Buswell IV and Stefan Jackiw
- cellist Matt Haimovitz
- pianists Randall Hodgkinson and Benjamin Pasternack.

There are as many soloists drawn from the ranks of the Boston Symphony, including:

- Ann Hobson Pilot
- Doriot Anthony Dwyer
- Tatiana Dimitriades
- Edwin Barker
- Haldan Martinson
- Daniel Katzen
- Sato Knudsen
- Keisuke Wakao
