= 57th Annual Grammy Awards =

2015 US music awards ceremony

- Official poster
- Date: February 8, 2015
- Location: Staples Center, Los Angeles, California, U.S.
- Hosted by: LL Cool J

Highlights
- Most awards: Sam Smith (4)
- Most nominations: Beyoncé, Sam Smith, Pharrell Williams (6 each)
- Website: http://www.grammy.com/

Television/radio coverage
- Network: CBS
- Viewership: 25.3 million viewers

The 57th Annual Grammy Awards were held on February 8, 2015, at the Staples Center in Los Angeles, California. The show was broadcast live by CBS at 5:00 p.m. PST (UTC−8). Rapper LL Cool J hosted the show for the fourth consecutive time.

The Grammy nominations were open for recordings released between October 1, 2013, and September 30, 2014. Breaking from tradition of a prime-time concert approach, the Grammy nominees were announced during an all-day event on December 5, 2014, starting with initial announcements on the CBS This Morning telecast, followed by updates made through The Grammys' official Twitter account.

Sam Smith won four awards, including Best New Artist, Record of the Year, Song of the Year for "Stay with Me" and Best Pop Vocal Album for In the Lonely Hour. Beck's album Morning Phase was named Album of the Year. This prompted Kanye West, who later said he thought Beyoncé should have won, to jokingly leap onstage to interrupt Beck in a re-enactment of his 2009 MTV VMA scandal, but West left the stage without saying anything. Both Pharrell Williams and Beyoncé took three honors; with her wins, Beyoncé became the second-most-honored female musician in Grammy history following Alison Krauss. Lifetime Achievement awards were given to the Bee Gees, George Harrison, Pierre Boulez, Buddy Guy, and Flaco Jiménez.

In all, 83 Grammy Awards were presented, one more than in 2014.

The show aired simultaneously on Fox8 in Australia, Sky TV in New Zealand, and on Channel O in South Africa.

== Pre-telecast ceremony ==
Not all Grammys were presented during the live telecast. As in previous years, most awards were handed out during the so-called pre-telecast ceremony, held at the Nokia Theater next to the Staples Center, which takes place during the afternoon before the main show. From 2015 on, this ceremony has been known as the Premiere Ceremony. Approximately 70 Grammys were presented at this ceremony, consisting of the "minor" categories.

== Performers ==
Artist(s)	Song(s)
AC/DC	"Rock or Bust" "Highway to Hell"
Ariana Grande	"Just a Little Bit of Your Heart"
Tom Jones; Jessie J	"You've Lost That Lovin' Feelin'"
Miranda Lambert	"Little Red Wagon"
Kanye West	"Only One"
Madonna	"Living for Love"
Ed Sheeran; John Mayer	"Thinking Out Loud"
Jeff Lynne's ELO	"Evil Woman" "Mr. Blue Sky"
Adam Levine; Gwen Stefani	"My Heart Is Open"
Hozier; Annie Lennox	"Take Me to Church" "I Put a Spell on You"
Pharrell Williams; Lang Lang; Hans Zimmer	"Happy"
Katy Perry	"By the Grace of God"
Imagine Dragons	"Shots" (live commercial from Las Vegas)
Tony Bennett; Lady Gaga	"Cheek to Cheek"
Usher	Tribute to Stevie Wonder "If It's Magic"
Eric Church	"Give Me Back My Hometown"
Brandy Clark; Dwight Yoakam	"Hold My Hand"
Rihanna; Kanye West; Paul McCartney	"FourFiveSeconds"
Sam Smith; Mary J. Blige	"Stay with Me"
Juanes	"Juntos (Together)"
Sia	"Chandelier"
Beck; Chris Martin	"Heart Is a Drum"
Beyoncé	"Take My Hand, Precious Lord"
John Legend; Common	"Glory"

During the ceremony, United States President Barack Obama delivered a pre-recorded message in which he spoke about domestic violence against women. His message was followed by a plea from domestic violence advocate Brooke Axtell and singer Katy Perry performing her ballad "By the Grace of God" as a dedication to the victims of the crime.

== Presenters ==
- Taylor Swift – presented Best New Artist, introducing Sam Smith and Mary J. Blige
- Anna Kendrick – introduced Ariana Grande
- Jessie J and Tom Jones – presented Best Pop Solo Performance
- Dierks Bentley – introduced Miranda Lambert
- Pentatonix and Barry Gibb – presented Best Pop Vocal Album
- Miley Cyrus and Nicki Minaj – introduced Madonna
- Josh Duhamel, Julian Edelman, and Malcolm Butler – presented Best Rock Album
- Smokey Robinson and Nile Rodgers – presented Best R&B Performance
- James Corden – introduced Ed Sheeran and John Mayer
- Ryan Seacrest – introduced Adam Levine and Gwen Stefani
- Meghan Trainor and Nick Jonas – presented Best Country Album
- The Weeknd – introduced Pharrell Williams and Lang Lang
- Katharine McPhee – introduced Lady Gaga and Tony Bennett
- Keith Urban – introduced Eric Church
- Gina Rodriguez – introduced Juanes
- Prince – presented Album of the Year
- Shia LaBeouf – introduced Sia
- Enrique Iglesias – presented Song of the Year
- Dave Grohl – introduced Beck and Chris Martin
- Jamie Foxx and Stevie Wonder - presented Record of the Year
- Gwyneth Paltrow – introduced Beyoncé

== Winners and nominees ==
The eligibility period for the 57th Annual Grammy Awards was October 1, 2013, to September 30, 2014. The nominees were announced on December 5, 2014. The Album of the Year nominees were announced during A Very Grammy Christmas, which was broadcast on the same day.

=== General ===
Record of the Year

- "Stay with Me" (Darkchild Version) – Sam Smith
  - Steve Fitzmaurice, Rodney Jerkins and Jimmy Napes, producers; Steve Fitzmaurice, Jimmy Napes and Steve Price, engineers/mixers; Tom Coyne, mastering engineer
- "Fancy" – Iggy Azalea featuring Charli XCX
  - The Arcade and The Invisible Men, producers; Anthony Kilhofler and Eric Weaver, engineers/mixers; Miles Showell, mastering engineer
- "Chandelier" – Sia
  - Greg Kurstin and Jesse Shatkin, producers; Greg Kurstin, Manny Marroquin and Jesse Shatkin, engineers/mixers; Emily Lazar, mastering engineer
- "Shake It Off" – Taylor Swift
  - Max Martin and Shellback, producers; Serban Ghenea, John Hanes, Sam Holland and Michael Ilbert, engineers/mixers; Tom Coyne, mastering engineer
- "All About That Bass" – Meghan Trainor
  - Kevin Kadish, producer; Kevin Kadish, engineer/mixer; Dave Kutch, mastering engineer

Album of the Year

- Morning Phase – Beck
  - Beck Hansen, producer; Tom Elmhirst, David Greenbaum, Florian Lagatta, Cole Marsden Greif-Neill, Robbie Nelson, Darrell Thorp, Cassidy Turbin and Joe Visciano, engineers/mixers; Bob Ludwig, mastering engineer
- In the Lonely Hour – Sam Smith
  - Steve Fitzmaurice, Komi, Howard Lawrence, Zane Lowe, Mojam, Jimmy Napes, Naughty Boy, Fraser T Smith, Two Inch Punch and Eg White, producers; Michael Angelo, Graham Archer, Steve Fitzmaurice, Simon Hale, Darren Heelis, James Murray, Jimmy Napes, Mustafa Omer, Dan Parry, Steve Price and Eg White, engineers/mixers; Tom Coyne and Stuart Hawkes, mastering engineers
- Beyoncé – Beyoncé
  - Chimamanda Ngozi Adichie, Drake, Jay Z and Frank Ocean, featured artists; Ammo, Boots, Noel "Detail" Fisher, Jerome Harmon, Hit-Boy, Beyoncé Knowles, Terius "The Dream" Nash, Caroline Polachek, Rey Reel, Noah "40" Shebib, Ryan Tedder, Timbaland, Justin Timberlake, Key Wane and Pharrell Williams, producers; Boots, Noel Cadastre, Noel "Gadget" Campbell, Rob Cohen, Andrew Coleman, Chris Godbey, Justin Hergett, James Krausse, Mike Larson, Jonathan Lee, Tony Maserati, Ann Mincieli, Caroline Polachek, Andrew Scheps, Bart Schoudel, Noah "40" Shebib, Ryan Tedder, Stuart White and Jordan "DJ Swivel" Young, engineers/mixers; Tom Coyne, James Krausse and Aya Merrill, mastering engineers
- x – Ed Sheeran
  - Jeff Bhasker, Benny Blanco, Jake Gosling, Johnny McDaid, Rick Rubin and Pharrell Williams, producers; Andrew Coleman, Jake Gosling, Matty Green, William Hicks, Tyler Sam Johnson, Jason Lader, Johnny McDaid, Chris Scafani, Mark Stent and Geoff Swan, engineers/mixers; Stuart Hawkes, mastering engineer
- G I R L – Pharrell Williams
  - Alicia Keys and Justin Timberlake, featured artists; Pharrell Williams, producer; Leslie Brathwaite, Adrian Breakspear, Andrew Coleman, Jimmy Douglas, Hart Gunther, Mick Guzauski, Florian Lagatta, Mike Larson, Stephanie McNally, Alan Meyerson, Ann Mincieli and Kenta Yonesaka, engineers/mixers; Bob Ludwig, mastering engineer

Song of the Year

- "Stay with Me" (Darkchild Version)^{1}
  - James Napier, William Phillips and Sam Smith, songwriters (Sam Smith)
- "All About That Bass"
  - Kevin Kadish and Meghan Trainor, songwriters (Meghan Trainor)
- "Chandelier"
  - Sia Furler and Jesse Shatkin, songwriters (Sia)
- "Shake It Off"
  - Max Martin, Shellback and Taylor Swift, songwriters (Taylor Swift)
- "Take Me to Church"
  - Andrew Hozier-Byrne, songwriter (Hozier)

Best New Artist

- Sam Smith
- Iggy Azalea
- Bastille
- Brandy Clark
- HAIM

=== Pop ===
Best Pop Solo Performance

- "Happy (Live)" – Pharrell Williams
- "All of Me (Live)" – John Legend
- "Stay With Me (Darkchild Version)" – Sam Smith
- "Chandelier" – Sia
- "Shake It Off" – Taylor Swift

Best Pop Duo/Group Performance

- "Say Something" – A Great Big World and Christina Aguilera
- "Fancy" – Iggy Azalea featuring Charli XCX
- "A Sky Full of Stars" – Coldplay
- "Bang Bang" – Jessie J, Ariana Grande, and Nicki Minaj
- "Dark Horse" – Katy Perry featuring Juicy J

Best Pop Vocal Album

- In the Lonely Hour – Sam Smith
- Ghost Stories – Coldplay
- Bangerz – Miley Cyrus
- My Everything – Ariana Grande
- Prism – Katy Perry
- x – Ed Sheeran

Best Traditional Pop Vocal Album

- Cheek to Cheek – Tony Bennett and Lady Gaga
- Nostalgia – Annie Lennox
- Night Songs – Barry Manilow
- Sending You a Little Christmas – Johnny Mathis
- Partners – Barbra Streisand

=== Dance/Electronic ===
Best Dance Recording

- "Rather Be" – Clean Bandit featuring Jess Glynne
  - Grace Chatto and Jack Patterson, producers; Wez Clarke and Jack Patterson, mixers
- "Never Say Never" – Basement Jaxx featuring ETML
  - Basement Jaxx, producers; Basement Jaxx, mixers
- "F For You" – Disclosure featuring Mary J. Blige
  - Disclosure, producer; Disclosure, mixer
- "I Got U" – Duke Dumont featuring Jax Jones
  - Duke Dumont and Jax Jones, producers; Tommy Forrest, mixer
- "Faded" – Zhu
  - Zhu, producer; Zhu, mixer

Best Dance/Electronic Album

- Syro – Aphex Twin
- while(1<2) – deadmau5
- Nabuma Rubberband – Little Dragon
- Do It Again – Röyksopp and Robyn
- Damage Control – Mat Zo

=== Contemporary Instrumental ===
Best Contemporary Instrumental Album

- Bass & Mandolin – Chris Thile and Edgar Meyer
- Wild Heart – Mindi Abair
- Slam Dunk – Gerald Albright
- Nathan East – Nathan East
- Jazz Funk Soul – Jeff Lorber, Chuck Loeb and Everette Harp

=== Rock ===
Best Rock Performance

- "Lazaretto" – Jack White
- "Gimme Something Good" – Ryan Adams
- "Do I Wanna Know?" – Arctic Monkeys
- "Blue Moon" – Beck
- "Fever" – The Black Keys

Best Metal Performance

- "The Last in Line" – Tenacious D
- "Neon Knights" – Anthrax
- "High Road" – Mastodon
- "Heartbreaker" – Motörhead
- "The Negative One" – Slipknot

Best Rock Song

- "Ain't It Fun"
  - Hayley Williams and Taylor York, songwriters (Paramore)
- "Blue Moon"
  - Beck Hansen, songwriter (Beck)
- "Fever"
  - Dan Auerbach, Patrick Carney and Brian Burton, songwriters (The Black Keys)
- "Gimme Something Good"
  - Ryan Adams, songwriter (Ryan Adams)
- "Lazaretto"
  - Jack White, songwriter (Jack White)

Best Rock Album

- Morning Phase – Beck
- Ryan Adams – Ryan Adams
- Turn Blue – The Black Keys
- Hypnotic Eye – Tom Petty and the Heartbreakers
- Songs of Innocence – U2

=== Alternative ===
Best Alternative Music Album

- St. Vincent – St. Vincent
- This Is All Yours – alt-J
- Reflektor – Arcade Fire
- Melophobia – Cage the Elephant
- Lazaretto – Jack White

=== R&B ===
Best R&B Performance

- "Drunk in Love" – Beyoncé featuring Jay Z
- "New Flame" – Chris Brown featuring Usher and Rick Ross
- "It's Your World" – Jennifer Hudson featuring R. Kelly
- "Like This" – Ledisi
- "Good Kisser" – Usher

Best Traditional R&B Performance

- "Jesus Children" – Robert Glasper Experiment featuring Lalah Hathaway and Malcolm Jamal Warner
- "As" – Marsha Ambrosius and Anthony Hamilton
- "I.R.S" – Angie Fisher
- "Nobody" – Kem
- "Hold Up Wait a Minute (Woo Woo)" – Antonique Smith

Best R&B Song

- "Drunk in Love"
  - Shawn Carter, Rasool Diaz, Noel Fisher, Jerome Harmon, Beyoncé Knowles, Timothy Mosely, Andre Eric Proctor and Brian Soko, songwriters (Beyoncé featuring Jay Z)
- "Good Kisser"
  - Ronald "Flip" Colson, Warren "Oak" Felder, Usher Raymond IV, Jameel Roberts, Terry "Tru" Sneed and Andrew "Pop" Wansel, songwriters (Usher)
- "New Flame"
  - Eric Bellinger, Chris Brown, James Chambers, Malissa Hunter, Justin Booth Johnson, Mark Pitts, Usher Raymond IV, William Roberts, Maurice "Verse" Simmonds and Keith Thomas, songwriters (Chris Brown featuring Usher and Rick Ross)
- "Options (Wolfjames Version)"
  - Dominic Gordon, Brandon Hesson and Jamaica "Kahn-Cept" Smith, songwriters (Luke James)
- "The Worst"
  - Jhené Aiko Chilombo, Mac Robinson and Brian Warfield, songwriter (Jhené Aiko)

Best Urban Contemporary Album

- G I R L – Pharrell Williams
- Sail Out – Jhené Aiko
- Beyoncé – Beyoncé
- X – Chris Brown
- Mali is... – Mali Music

Best R&B Album

- Love, Marriage & Divorce – Toni Braxton and Babyface
- Islander – Bernhoft
- Lift Your Spirit – Aloe Blacc
- Black Radio 2 – Robert Glasper Experiment
- Give The People What They Want – Sharon Jones and The Dap-Kings

=== Rap ===
Best Rap Performance

- "i" – Kendrick Lamar
- "3005" – Childish Gambino
- "0 to 100 / The Catch Up" – Drake
- "Rap God" – Eminem
- "All I Need Is You" – Lecrae

Best Rap/Sung Collaboration

- "The Monster" – Eminem featuring Rihanna
- "Blak Majik" – Common featuring Jhené Aiko
- "Tuesday" – ILoveMakonnen featuring Drake
- "Studio" – Schoolboy Q featuring BJ the Chicago Kid
- "Bound 2" – Kanye West featuring Charlie Wilson

Best Rap Song

- "i"
  - Kendrick Duckworth and Columbus Smith III, songwriters (Kendrick Lamar)
- "Anaconda"
  - Ernest Clark, Jamal Jones, Onika Maraj, Marcos Palacios and Jonathan Solone-Myvett, Anthony Ray songwriters (Nicki Minaj)
- "Bound 2"
  - Mike Dean, Malik Jones, Che Pope, Elon Rutberg, Sakiya Sandifer, John Stephens, Kanye West, Charlie Wilson and Cydel Young, songwriters (Kanye West featuring Charlie Wilson)
- "We Dem Boyz"
  - Noel Fisher and Cameron Thomaz, songwriters (Wiz Khalifa)
- "0 to 100 / The Catch Up"
  - A. Feeney, Aubrey Graham, Anderson Hernandez, P. Jefferies, Matthew Samuels and Noah Shebib, songwriters (Drake)

Best Rap Album

- The Marshall Mathers LP 2 – Eminem
- The New Classic – Iggy Azalea
- Because the Internet – Childish Gambino
- Nobody's Smiling – Common
- Oxymoron – ScHoolboy Q
- Blacc Hollywood – Wiz Khalifa

=== Country ===
Best Country Solo Performance

- "Something in the Water" – Carrie Underwood
- "Give Me Back My Hometown" – Eric Church
- "Invisible" – Hunter Hayes
- "Automatic" – Miranda Lambert
- "Cop Car" – Keith Urban

Best Country Duo/Group Performance

- "Gentle on My Mind" – The Band Perry
- "Somethin' Bad" – Miranda Lambert with Carrie Underwood
- "Day Drinking" – Little Big Town
- "Meanwhile Back at Mama's – Tim McGraw featuring Faith Hill
- "Raise 'Em Up" – Keith Urban featuring Eric Church

Best Country Song

- "I'm Not Gonna Miss You"
  - Glen Campbell and Julian Raymond, songwriters (Glen Campbell)
- "American Kids"
  - Rodney Clawson, Luke Laird and Shane McAnally, songwriters (Kenny Chesney)
- "Automatic"
  - Nicolle Galyon, Natalie Hemby and Miranda Lambert, songwriters (Miranda Lambert)
- "Give Me Back My Hometown"
  - Eric Church and Luke Laird, songwriters (Eric Church)
- "Meanwhile Back at Mama's"
  - Tom Douglas, Jaren Johnston and Jeffrey Steele, songwriters (Tim McGraw featuring Faith Hill)

Best Country Album

- Platinum – Miranda Lambert
- Riser – Dierks Bentley
- The Outsiders – Eric Church
- 12 Stories – Brandy Clark
- The Way I'm Livin' – Lee Ann Womack

=== New Age ===
Best New Age Album

- Winds of Samsara – Ricky Kej and Wouter Kellerman
- Bhakti – Paul Avgerinos
- Ritual – Peter Kater and R. Carlos Nakai
- Symphony Live in Istanbul – Kitaro
- In Love and Longing – Silvia Nakkach and David Darling

=== Jazz ===
Best Improvised Jazz Solo

- "Fingerprints" – Chick Corea, soloist
- "The Eye of the Hurricane" – Kenny Barron, soloist
- "You and the Night and the Music" – Fred Hersch, soloist
- "Recorda Me" – Joe Lovano, soloist
- "Sleeping Giant" – Brad Mehldau, soloist

Best Jazz Vocal Album

- Beautiful Life – Dianne Reeves
- Map to the Treasure: Reimagining Laura Nyro – Billy Childs and various artists
- I Wanna Be Evil – René Marie
- Live in NYC – Gretchen Parlato
- Paris Sessions – Tierney Sutton

Best Jazz Instrumental Album

- Trilogy – Chick Corea Trio
- Landmarks – Brian Blade and the Fellowship Band
- Floating – Fred Hersch Trio
- Enjoy the View – Bobby Hutcherson, David Sanborn, Joey DeFrancesco featuring Billy Hart
- All Rise: A Joyful Elegy for Fats Waller – Jason Moran

Best Large Jazz Ensemble Album

- Life in the Bubble – Gordon Goodwin's Big Phat Band
- The L.A. Treasures Project – Clayton-Hamilton Jazz Orchestra
- Quiet Pride: The Elizabeth Catlett Project – Rufus Reid
- Live: I Hear the Sound – Archie Shepp Attica Blues Orchestra
- OverTime: Music of Bob Brookmeyer – Vanguard Jazz Orchestra

Best Latin Jazz Album

- The Offense of the Drum – Arturo O'Farrill and the Afro Latin Jazz Orchestra
- The Latin Side of Joe Henderson – Conrad Herwig featuring Joe Lovano
- The Pedrito Martinez Group – Pedrito Martinez Group
- Second Half – Emilio Solla y la Inestable de Brooklyn
- New Throned King – Yosvany Terry

=== Gospel/Contemporary Christian ===
Best Gospel Performance/Song

- "No Greater Love" – Smokie Norful
  - Aaron W. Lindsey, Smokie Norful, songwriters
- "Help" – Erica Campbell featuring Lecrae
  - Erica Campbell, Warryn Campbell, Hasben Jones, Harold Lilly, Lecrae Moore, Aaron Sledge, songwriters
- "Sunday A.M. (Live)" – Karen Clark Sheard
  - Rudy Currence, Donald Lawrence, songwriters
- "I Believe" – Mali Music
  - Kortney J. Pollard, songwriter
- "Love on the Radio" – The Walls Group
- "In the Raw" – Tehrah
  - Kirk Franklin, songwriter

Best Contemporary Christian Music Performance/Song

- "Messengers" – Lecrae featuring For King & Country
  - Torrance Esmond, Ran Jackson, Ricky Jackson, Kenneth Chris Mackey, Lecrae Moore, Joseph Prielozny, Joel Smallbone, Luke Smallbone, songwriters
- "Write Your Story" – Francesca Battistelli
  - Francesca Battistelli, David Arthur Garcia, Ben Glover, songwriters
- "Come as You Are" – Crowder
  - David Crowder, Ben Glover and Matt Maher, songwriters
- "Shake" – MercyMe
  - Nathan Cochran, David Arthur Garcia, Ben Glover, Barry Graul, Bart Millard, Soli Olds, Mike Scheuchzer, Robby Shaffer, songwriters
- "Multiplied" – Needtobreathe
  - Bear Rinehart, Bo Rinehart, songwriters

Best Gospel Album

- Help – Erica Campbell
- Amazing (Live) – Ricky Dillard and New G
- Withholding Nothing (Live) – William McDowell
- Forever Yours – Smokie Norful
- Vintage Worship – Anita Wilson

Best Contemporary Christian Music Album

- Run Wild. Live Free. Love Strong. – For King & Country
- If We're Honest – Francesca Battistelli
- Hurricane – Natalie Grant
- Welcome to the New – MercyMe
- Royal Tailor – Royal Tailor

Best Roots Gospel Album

- Shine for All the People – Mike Farris
- Forever Changed – T. Graham Brown
- Hymns – Gaither Vocal Band
- A Cappella – The Martins
- His Way of Loving Me – Tim Menzies

=== Latin ===
Best Latin Pop Album

- Tangos – Rubén Blades
- Elypse – Camila
- Raíz – Lila Downs, Niña Pastori and Soledad
- Loco de Amor – Juanes
- Gracias Por Estar Aquí – Marco Antonio Solís

Best Latin Rock Urban or Alternative Album

- Multi Viral – Calle 13
- Behind The Machine (Detrás De La Máquina) – ChocQuibTown
- Bailar en la Cueva – Jorge Drexler
- Agua Maldita – Molotov
- Vengo – Ana Tijoux

Best Regional Mexican Music Album (Including Tejano)

- Mano A Mano – Tangos A La Manera De Vicente Fernández – Vicente Fernández
- Lastima Que Sean Ajenas – Pepe Aguilar
- Voz Y Guitarra – Ixya Herrera
- 15 Aniversario – Mariachi Divas de Cindy Shea
- Alegría Del Mariachi – Mariachi Los Arrieros Del Valle

Best Tropical Latin Album

- Más + Corazón Profundo – Carlos Vives
- 50 Aniversario – El Gran Combo de Puerto Rico
- First Class To Havana – Aymée Nuviola
- Live – Palo!
- El Asunto – Totó La Momposina

=== Americana Music ===
Best American Roots Performance

- "A Feather's Not a Bird" – Rosanne Cash
- "Statesboro Blues" – Gregg Allman and Taj Mahal
- "And When I Die" – Billy Childs featuring Alison Krauss and Jerry Douglas
- "The Old Me Better" – Keb' Mo' featuring the California Feet Warmers
- "Destination" – Nickel Creek

Best American Roots Song

- "A Feather's Not a Bird" – Rosanne Cash and John Leventhal, songwriters (Rosanne Cash)
- "Just So Much" – Jesse Winchester, songwriter (Jesse Winchester)
- "The New York Trains" – Woody Guthrie and Del McCoury, songwriters (Del McCoury Band)
- "Pretty Little One" – Edie Brickell and Steve Martin, songwriters (Steve Martin and the Steep Canyon Rangers featuring Edie Brickell)
- "Terms of My Surrender" – John Hiatt, songwriter (John Hiatt)

Best Americana Album

- The River & the Thread – Rosanne Cash
- Terms of My Surrender – John Hiatt
- BluesAmericana – Keb' Mo'
- A Dotted Line – Nickel Creek
- Metamodern Sounds in Country Music – Sturgill Simpson

Best Bluegrass Album

- The Earls of Leicester – The Earls of Leicester
- Noam Pikelny Plays Kenny Baker Plays Bill Monroe – Noam Pikelny
- Cold Spell – Frank Solivan and Dirty Kitchen
- Into My Own – Bryan Sutton
- Only Me – Rhonda Vincent

Best Blues Album

- Step Back – Johnny Winter
- Common Ground: Dave Alvin & Phil Alvin Play and Sing the Songs of Big Bill Broonzy – Dave Alvin and Phil Alvin
- Promise of a Brand New Day – Ruthie Foster
- Juke Joint Chapel – Charlie Musselwhite
- Decisions – Bobby Rush with Blinddog Smokin'

Best Folk Album

- Remedy – Old Crow Medicine Show
- Three Bells – Mike Auldridge, Jerry Douglas, Rob Ickes
- Follow the Music – Alice Gerrard
- The Nocturne Diaries – Eliza Gilkyson
- A Reasonable Amount of Trouble – Jesse Winchester

Best Regional Music Album

- The Legacy – Jo-El Sonnier
- Light the Stars – Bonsoir, Catin
- Hanu 'A'ala – Kamaka Kukona
- Love's Lies – Magnolia Sisters
- Ceremony – Joe Tohonnie Jr.

=== Reggae ===
Best Reggae Album

- Fly Rasta – Ziggy Marley
- Back on the Controls – Lee "Scratch" Perry
- Full Frequency – Sean Paul
- Out of Many, One Music – Shaggy
- Reggae Power – Sly and Robbie and Spicy Chocolate
- Amid the Noise and the Haste – SOJA

=== World Music ===
Best World Music Album

- Eve – Angélique Kidjo
- Toumani & Sidiki – Toumani Diabaté and Sidiki Diabaté
- Our World in Song – Wu Man, Luis Conte and Daniel Ho
- Magic – Sérgio Mendes
- Traces of You – Anoushka Shankar

=== Children's ===
Best Children's Album

- I Am Malala: How One Girl Stood Up For Education And Changed The World (Malala Yousafzai) – Neela Vaswani
- Appetite For Construction – The Pop Ups
- Just Say Hi! – Brady Rymer and the Little Band That Could
- The Perfect Quirk – Secret Agent 23 Skidoo
- Through The Woods – The Okee Dokee Brothers

=== Spoken Word ===
Best Spoken Word Album (Includes Poetry, Audio Books and Story Telling)

- Diary of a Mad Diva – Joan Rivers
- Actors Anonymous – James Franco
- A Call to Action – Jimmy Carter
- Carsick: John Waters Hitchhikes Across America – John Waters
- A Fighting Chance – Elizabeth Warren
- We Will Survive: True Stories of Encouragement, Inspiration, and the Power of Song – Gloria Gaynor

=== Comedy ===
Best Comedy Album

- Mandatory Fun – "Weird Al" Yankovic
- Obsessed – Jim Gaffigan
- Oh My God – Louis C.K.
- Tragedy Plus Comedy Equals Time – Patton Oswalt
- We Are Miracles – Sarah Silverman

=== Musical Show ===
Best Musical Theater Album

- Beautiful: The Carole King Musical – Jessie Mueller, principal soloist; Jason Howland, Steve Sidwell and Billy Jay Stein, producers (Carole King, composer and lyricist) (original Broadway cast)
- Aladdin – James Monroe Iglehart, Adam Jacobs and Courtney Reed, principal soloists; Frank Filipetti, Michael Kosarin, Alan Menken and Chris Montan, producers (Alan Menken, composer; Howard Ashman, Chad Beguelin and Tim Rice, lyricists) (original Broadway cast)
- A Gentleman's Guide to Love and Murder – Jefferson Mays and Bryce Pinkham, principal soloists; Kurt Deutsch and Joel Moss, producers; Robert L. Freedman, lyricist; Steven Lutvak, composer and lyricist (original Broadway cast)
- Hedwig and the Angry Inch – Lena Hall and Neil Patrick Harris, principal soloists; Justin Craig, Tim O'Heir and Stephen Trask, producers (Stephen Trask, composer and lyricist) (original Broadway cast)
- West Side Story – Cheyenne Jackson and Alexandra Silber, principal soloists; Jack Vad, producer (Leonard Bernstein, composer; Stephen Sondheim, lyricist) (Cheyenne Jackson and Alexandra Silber with the San Francisco Symphony)

=== Music for Visual Media ===
Best Compilation Soundtrack for Visual Media

- Frozen – various artists
- American Hustle – various artists
- Get on Up: The James Brown Story – James Brown
- Guardians of the Galaxy: Awesome Mix Vol. 1 – various artists
- The Wolf of Wall Street – various artists

Best Score Soundtrack for Visual Media

- The Grand Budapest Hotel: Original Soundtrack – Alexandre Desplat, composer
- Frozen – Christophe Beck, composer
- Gone Girl: Soundtrack from the Motion Picture – Trent Reznor and Atticus Ross, composers
- Gravity: Original Motion Picture Soundtrack – Steven Price, composer
- Saving Mr. Banks – Thomas Newman, composer

Best Song Written for Visual Media

- "Let It Go" (from Frozen) – Kristen Anderson-Lopez and Robert Lopez, songwriters (Idina Menzel)
- "Everything Is Awesome" (from The Lego Movie) – Joshua Bartholomew, Lisa Harriton, Shawn Patterson, Andy Samberg, Akiva Schaffer and Jorma Taccone, songwriters (Tegan and Sara featuring the Lonely Island)
- "I See Fire" (from The Hobbit: The Desolation of Smaug) – Ed Sheeran, songwriter (Ed Sheeran)
- "I'm Not Gonna Miss You" (from Glen Campbell: I'll Be Me) – Glen Campbell and Julian Raymond, songwriters (Glen Campbell)
- "The Moon Song" (from Her) – Spike Jonze and Karen O, songwriters (Scarlett Johansson and Joaquin Phoenix)

=== Composing/Arranging ===
Best Instrumental Composition

- "The Book Thief"
  - John Williams, composer (John Williams)
- "Last Train To Sanity"
  - Stanley Clarke, composer (The Stanley Clarke Band)
- "Life in the Bubble"
  - Gordon Goodwin, composer (Gordon Goodwin's Big Phat Band)
- "Recognition"
  - Rufus Reid, composer (Rufus Reid)
- "Tarnation"
  - Edgar Meyer and Chris Thile, composers (Chris Thile and Edgar Meyer)

Best Arrangement, Instrumental or a Cappella

- "Daft Punk"
  - Ben Bram, Mitch Grassi, Scott Hoying, Avi Kaplan, Kirstie Maldonado and Kevin Olusola, arrangers (Pentatonix)
- "Beautiful Dreamer"
  - Pete McGuinness, arranger (The Pete McGuinness Jazz Orchestra)
- "Get Smart"
  - Gordon Goodwin, arranger (Gordon Goodwin's Big Phat Band)
- "Guantanamera"
  - Alfredo Rodríguez, arranger (Alfredo Rodríguez)
- "Moon River"
  - Chris Walden, arranger (Amy Dickson)

Best Arrangement, Instruments And Vocals

- "New York Tendaberry"
  - Billy Childs, arranger (Billy Childs Featuring Renée Fleming and Yo-Yo Ma)
- "All My Tomorrows"
  - Jeremy Fox, arranger (Jeremy Fox featuring Kate McGarry)
- "Goodnight America"
  - Vince Mendoza, arranger (Mary Chapin Carpenter)
- "Party Rockers"
  - Gordon Goodwin, arranger (Gordon Goodwin's Big Phat Band)
- "What Are You Doing The Rest of Your Life?"
  - Pete McGuinness, arranger (The Pete McGuinness Jazz Orchestra)

=== Crafts ===
Best Recording Package

- Lightning Bolt
  - Jeff Ament, Don Pendleton, Joe Spix and Jerome Turner, art directors (Pearl Jam)
- Formosa Medicine Show
  - David Chen and Andrew Wong, art directors (The Muddy Basin Ramblers)
- Indie Cindy
  - Vaughan Oliver, art director (Pixies)
- LP1
  - FKA Twigs and Phil Lee, art directors (FKA twigs)
- Whispers
  - Sarah Larnach, art director (Passenger)

Best Boxed or Special Limited Edition Package

- The Rise and Fall of Paramount Records, Volume One (1917–27)
  - Susan Archie, Dean Blackwood and Jack White, art directors (various artists)
- Cities of Darkscorch
  - Leland Meiners and Ken Shipley, art directors (various artists)
- A Letter Home (vinyl box set)
  - Gary Burden and Jenice Heo, art directors (Neil Young)
- Sparks (deluxe album box set)
  - Andy Carne, art director (Imogen Heap)
- Spring 1990 (The Other One)
  - Jessica Dessner, Lisa Glines, Doran Tyson and Steve Vance, art directors (Grateful Dead)

Best Album Notes

- Offering: Live at Temple University
  - Ashley Kahn, album notes writer (John Coltrane)
- Happy: The 1920 Rainbo Orchestra Sides
  - David Sager, album notes writer (Isham Jones Rainbo Orchestra)
- I'm Just Like You: Sly's Stone Flower 1969–70
  - Alec Palao, album notes writer (Various Artists)
- The Other Side Of Bakersfield: 1950s & 60s Boppers and Rockers from 'Nashville West
  - Scott B. Bomar, album notes writer (Various Artists)
- Purple Snow: Forecasting the Minneapolis Sound
  - Jon Kirby, album notes writer (Various Artists)
- The Rise & Fall Of Paramount Records, Volume One (1917–27)
  - Scott Blackwood, album notes writer (Various Artists)

=== Historical ===
Best Historical Album

- The Garden Spot Programs, 1950
  - Colin Escott and Cheryl Pawelski, compilation producers; Michael Graves, mastering engineer (Hank Williams)
- Black Europe: The Sounds And Images Of Black People In Europe Pre-1927
  - Jeffrey Green, Ranier E. Lotz and Howard Rye, compilation producers; Christian Zwarg, mastering engineer (Various Artists)
- Happy: The 1920 Rainbo Orchestra Sides
  - Meagan Hennessey and Richard Martin, compilation producers; Richard Martin, mastering engineer (Isham Jones Rainbo Orchestra)
- Longing for the Past: The 78 RPM Era In Southeast Asia
  - Steven Lance Ledbetter and David Murray, compilation producers; Michael Graves, mastering engineer (Various Artists)
- There's A Dream I've Been Saving: Lee Hazlewood Industries 1966 – 1971 (Deluxe Edition)
  - Hunter Lea, Patrick McCarthy and Matt Sullivan, compilation producers; John Baldwin, mastering engineer (Various Artists)

=== Production ===
Best Engineered Album, Non-Classical

- Morning Phase
  - Tom Elmhirst, David Greenbaum, Florian Lagatta, Cole Marsden, Greif Neill, Robbie Nelson, Darrell Thorp, Cassidy Turbin and Joe Visciano, engineers; Bob Ludwig, mastering engineer (Beck)
- Bass & Mandolin
  - Richard King and Dave Sinko, engineers; Robert C. Ludwig, mastering engineer (Chris Thile and Edgar Meyer)
- Bluesamericana
  - Ross Hogarth and Casey Wasner, engineers; Richard Dodd, mastering engineer (Keb' Mo')
- The Way I'm Livin'
  - Chuck Ainlay, engineer; Gavin Lurssen, mastering engineer (Lee Ann Womack)
- What's Left Is Forever
  - Tchad Blake, Oyvind Jakobsen, Jo Ranheim, Itai Shapiro and David Way, engineers; Bernie Grundman, mastering engineer (Thomas Dybdahl)

Producer of the Year, Non-Classical

- Max Martin
  - "Bang Bang" (Jessie J, Ariana Grande and Nicki Minaj)
  - "Break Free" (Ariana Grande Featuring Zedd)
  - "Dark Horse" (Katy Perry Featuring Juicy J)
  - "Problem" (Ariana Grande Featuring Iggy Azalea)
  - "Shake It Off" (Taylor Swift)
  - "Unconditionally" (Katy Perry)
- Paul Epworth
  - "Pendulum" (FKA Twigs)
  - "Queenie Eye" (Paul McCartney)
  - "Road" (Paul McCartney)
  - "Save Us" (Paul McCartney)
- John Hill
  - "All You Never Say" (Birdy)
  - "Burning Gold" (Christina Perri)
  - "Can't Remember to Forget You" (Shakira Featuring Rihanna)
  - "Goldmine" (Kimbra)
  - "Guts Over Fear" (Eminem Featuring Sia)
  - Strange Desire (Bleachers)
  - Voices (Phantogram)
  - "Water Fountain" (Tune-Yards)
- Jay Joyce
  - About Last Night (Sleeper Agent)
  - It Goes Like This (Thomas Rhett)
  - Melophobia (Cage the Elephant)
  - Montibello Memories (Matrimony)
  - Mountains of Sorrow, Rivers of Song (Amos Lee)
  - The Outsiders (Eric Church)
- Greg Kurstin
  - "Beating Heart" (Ellie Goulding)
  - "Chandelier" (Sia)
  - "Double Rainbow" (Katy Perry)
  - "Gunshot" (Lykke Li)
  - "Money Power Glory" (Lana Del Rey)
  - 1000 Forms of Fear (Sia)
  - Sheezus (Lily Allen)
  - Wrapped in Red (Kelly Clarkson)

Best Remixed Recording, Non-Classical

- "All of Me" (Tiësto's Birthday Treatment Remix)
  - Tijs Michiel Verwest, remixer (John Legend)
- "Falling Out" (Ming Remix)
  - Aaron Albano, remixer (Crossfingers Featuring Danny Losito)
- "Pompeii" (Audien Remix)
  - Nathaniel Rathbun, remixer (Bastille)
- "The Rising" (Eddie Amador Remix)
  - Eddie Amador, remixer (Five Knives)
- "Smile" (Kaskade Edit)
  - Ryan Raddon, remixer (Galantis)
- "Waves" (Robin Schulz Remix)
  - Robin Schulz, remixer (Mr Probz)

=== Production, Surround Sound ===
Best Surround Sound Album

- Beyoncé
  - Elliot Scheiner, surround mix engineer; Bob Ludwig, surround mastering engineer; Beyoncé Knowles, surround producer (Beyoncé)
- Beppe: Remote Galaxy
  - Morten Lindberg, surround mix engineer; Morten Lindberg, surround mastering engineer; Morten Lindberg, surround producer (Vladimir Ashkenazy and Philharmonia Orchestra)
- Chamberland: The Berlin Remixes
  - David Miles Huber, surround mix engineer; David Miles Huber, surround mastering engineer; David Miles Huber, surround producer (David Miles Huber)
- The Division Bell (20th Anniversary Deluxe Box Set)
  - Damon Iddins and Andy Jackson, surround mix engineers; Damon Iddins and Andy Jackson, surround mastering engineers (Pink Floyd)
- Epics Of Love
  - Hans-Jörg Maucksch, surround mix engineer; Hans-Jörg Maucksch, surround mastering engineer; Günter Pauler, surround producer (Song Zuying, Yu Long and China Philharmonic Orchestra)
- Mahler: Symphony No. 2 'Resurrection
  - Michael Bishop, surround mix engineer; Michael Bishop, surround mastering engineer; Elaine Martone, surround producer (Benjamin Zander and Philharmonia Orchestra)

=== Production, Classical ===
Best Engineered Album, Classical

- Vaughan Williams: Dona Nobis Pacem; Symphony No. 4; The Lark Ascending
  - Michael Bishop, engineer; Michael Bishop, mastering engineer (Robert Spano, Norman Mackenzie, Atlanta Symphony Orchestra and Chorus)
- Adams, John: City Noir
  - Richard King, engineer; Wolfgang Schiefermair, mastering engineer (David Robertson and St. Louis Symphony)
- Adams, John Luther: Become Ocean
  - Dmitriy Lipay and Nathaniel Reichman, engineers; Nathaniel Reichman, mastering engineer (Ludovic Morlot and Seattle Symphony)
- Dutilleux: Symphony No. 1; Tout Un Monde Lointain; The Shadows Of Time
  - Dmitriy Lipay, engineer; Dmitriy Lipay, mastering engineer (Ludovic Morlot and Seattle Symphony)
- Riccardo Muti Conducts Mason Bates and Anna Clyne
  - David Frost and Christopher Willis, engineers; Tim Martyn, mastering engineer (Riccardo Muti and Chicago Symphony Orchestra)

Producer of the Year, Classical

- Judith Sherman
  - Beethoven: Cello and Piano Complete (Fischer Duo)
  - Brahms By Heart (Chiara String Quartet)
  - Composing America (Lark Quartet)
  - Divergence (Plattform K + K Vienna)
  - The Good Song (Thomas Meglioranza)
  - Mozart and Brahms: Clarinet Quintets (Anthony McGill and Pacifica Quartet)
  - Snapshot (American Brass Quintet)
  - Two X Four (Jaime Laredo, Jennifer Koh, Vinay Parameswaran and Curtis 20/21 Ensemble)
  - Wagner Without Words (Llŷr Williams)
- Morten Lindberg
  - Beppe: Remote Galaxy (Vladimir Ashkenazy and Philharmonia Orchestra)
  - Dyrud: Out Of Darkness (Vivianne Sydnes and Nidaros Cathedral Choir)
  - Ja, Vi Elsker (Tone Bianca Sparre Dahl, Ingar Bergby, Staff Band Of The Norwegian Armed Forces and Schola Cantorum)
  - Symphonies Of Wind Instruments (Ingar Bergby & Royal Norwegian Navy Band)
- Dmitriy Lipay
  - Adams, John Luther: Become Ocean (Ludovic Morlot and Seattle Symphony)
  - Dutilleux: Symphony No. 1; Tout Un Monde Lointain; The Shadows of Time (Ludovic Morlot and Seattle Symphony)
  - Fauré: Masques Et Bergamasques; Pelléas Et Mélisande; Dolly (Ludovic Morlot, Seattle Symphony Chorale and Seattle Symphony)
  - Hindemith: Nobilissima Visione; Five Pieces For String Orchestra (Gerard Schwarz and Seattle Symphony)
  - Ives: Symphony No. 2; Carter: Instances; Gershwin: An American In Paris (Ludovic Morlot and Seattle Symphony)
  - Ravel: Orchestral Works; Saint-Saëns: Organ Symphony (Ludovic Morlot and Seattle Symphony)
- Elaine Martone
  - Hallowed Ground (Louis Langrée, Maya Angelou, Nathan Wyatt and Cincinnati Symphony Orchestra)
  - Mahler: Symphony No. 2 'Resurrection (Benjamin Zander, Stefan Bevier, Philharmonia Chorus and Orchestra)
  - Sibelius: Symphonies Nos. 6 and 7; Tapiola (Robert Spano and Atlanta Symphony Orchestra)
  - Vaughan Williams: Dona Nobis Pacem; Symphony No. 4; The Lark Ascending (Robert Spano, Norman Mackenzie, Atlanta Symphony Orchestra and Chorus)
- David Starobin
  - All The Things You Are (Leon Fleisher)
  - Complete Crumb Edition, Vol. 16 (Ann Crumb, Patrick Mason, James Freeman and Orchestra 2001)
  - Game of Attrition – Arlene Sierra, Vol. 2 (Jac Van Steen and BBC National Orchestra of Wales)
  - Haydn, Beethoven and Schubert (Gilbert Kalish)
  - Mozart: Piano Concertos, No. 12, K. 414 and No. 23, K. 488 (Marianna Shirinyan, Scott Yoo and Odense Symphony Orchestra)
  - Music Of Peter Lieberson, Vol. 3 (Scott Yoo, Roberto Diaz, Steven Beck and Odense Symphony Orchestra)
  - Rochberg, Chihara and Rorem (Jerome Lowenthal)
  - Tchaikovsky: The Tempest, Op. 18 and Piano Concerto No. 1, Op. 23 (Joyce Yang, Alexander Lazarev and Odense Symphony Orchestra)

=== Classical ===
Best Orchestral Performance

- Adams, John: City Noir
  - David Robertson, (St. Louis Symphony)
- Dutilleux: Symphony No. 1; Tout un monde lointain...; The Shadows of Time
  - Ludovic Morlot, conductor (Seattle Symphony)
- Dvořák: Symphony No. 8; Janacek: Symphonic Suite From Jenůfa
  - Manfred Honeck, conductor (Pittsburgh Symphony Orchestra)
- Schumann: Symphonien 1–4
  - Simon Rattle, conductor (Berliner Philharmoniker)
- Sibelius: Symphonies Nos. 6 and 7; Tapiola
  - Robert Spano, conductor (Atlanta Symphony Orchestra)

Best Opera Recording

- Charpentier: La descente d'Orphée aux enfers
  - Paul O'Dette and Stephen Stubbs, conductors; Aaron Sheehan; Renate Wolter-Seevers, producer (Boston Early Music Festival Chamber Ensemble; Boston Early Music Festival Vocal Ensemble)
- Milhaud: L'Orestie d'Eschyle
  - Kenneth Kiesler, conductor; Dan Kempson, Jennifer Lane, Tamara Mumford and Brenda Rae; Tim Handley, producer (University of Michigan Percussion Ensemble and University of Michigan Symphony Orchestra; University of Michigan Chamber Choir, University of Michigan Orpheus Singers, University of Michigan University Choir and UMS Choral Union)
- Rameau: Hippolyte et Aricie
  - William Christie, conductor; Sarah Connolly, Stéphane Degout, Christiane Karg, Ed Lyon and Katherine Watson; Sébastien Chonion, producer (Orchestra of the Age of Enlightenment; The Glyndebourne Chorus)
- Schönberg: Moses und Aron
  - Sylvain Cambreling, conductor; Andreas Conrad and Franz Grundheber; Reinhard Oechsler, producer (SWR Sinfonieorchester Baden-Baden und Freiburg; EuropaChorAkademie)
- Strauss: Elektra
  - Christian Thielemann, conductor; Evelyn Herlitzius, Waltraud Meier, René Pape and Anne Schwanewilms; Magdalena Herbst, producer (Staatskapelle Dresden; Sächsischer Staatsopernchor Dresden)

Best Choral Performance

Performers who are not eligible for an award (such as orchestras, soloists or choirs) are mentioned in parentheses

- The Sacred Spirit of Russia
  - Craig Hella Johnson, conductor (Conspirare)
- Bach: Matthäus-Passion
  - René Jacobs, conductor (Werner Güra and Johannes Weisser; Akademie Für Alte Musik Berlin; Rias Kammerchor and Staats-Und Domchor Berlin)
- Dyrud: Out of Darkness
  - Vivianne Sydnes, conductor (Erlend Aagaard Nilsen and Geir Morten Øien; Sarah Head and Lars Sitter; Nidaros Cathedral Choir)
- Holst: First Choral Symphony; The Mystic Trumpeter
  - Andrew Davis; Stephen Jackson, chorus master (Susan Gritton; BBC Symphony Orchestra; BBC Symphony Chorus)
- Mozart: Requiem Mass in D minor
  - John Butt, conductor (Matthew Brook, Rowan Hellier, Thomas Hobbs and Joanne Lunn; Dunedin Consort)

Best Chamber Music/Small Ensemble Performance

- In 27 Pieces – The Hilary Hahn Encores
  - Hilary Hahn and Cory Smythe
- Dreams and Prayers
  - David Krakauer and A Far Cry
- Martinů: Cello Sonatas Nos. 1–3
  - Steven Isserlis and Olli Mustonen
- Partch: Castor and Pollux
  - Partch
- Sing Thee Nowell
  - New York Polyphony

Best Classical Instrumental Solo

- Play
  - Jason Vieaux
- All The Things You Are
  - Leon Fleisher
- The Carnegie Recital
  - Daniil Trifonov
- Dutilleux: Tout un monde lointain...
  - Xavier Phillips; Ludovic Morlot, conductor (Seattle Symphony)
- Toccatas
  - Jory Vinikour

Best Classical Solo Vocal Album

- Douce France
  - Anne Sofie Von Otter; Bengt Forsberg, accompanist (Carl Bagge, Margareta Bengston, Mats Bergström, Per Ekdahl, Bengan Janson, Olle Linder and Antoine Tamestit)
- Porpora: Arias
  - Philippe Jaroussky; Andrea Marcon, conductor (Cecilia Bartoli; Venice Baroque Orchestra)
- Schubert: Die Schöne Müllerin
  - Florian Boesch; Malcolm Martineau, accompanist
- Stella Di Napoli
  - Joyce DiDonato; Riccardo Minasi, conductor (Chœur De L'Opéra National De Lyon; Orchestre De L'Opéra National De Lyon)
- Virtuoso Rossini Arias
  - Lawrence Brownlee; Constantine Orbelian, conductor (Kaunas City Symphony Orchestra)

Best Classical Compendium

- Partch: Plectra and Percussion Dances
  - Partch; John Schneider, producer
- Britten To America
  - Jeffrey Skidmore, conductor; Colin Matthews, producer
- Mieczysław Weinberg
  - Giedrė Dirvanauskaitė, Daniil Grishin, Gidon Kremer and Daniil Trifonov; Manfred Eicher, producer
- Mike Marshall and The Turtle Island Quartet
  - Mike Marshall (musician) and Turtle Island Quartet; Mike Marshall, producer
- The Solent – Fifty Years of Music By Ralph Vaughan Williams
  - Paul Daniel, conductor; Andrew Walton, producer

Best Contemporary Classical Composition

- Adams, John Luther: Become Ocean
  - John Luther Adams, composer (Ludovic Morlot and Seattle Symphony)
- Clyne, Anna: Prince of Clouds
  - Anna Clyne, composer (Jaime Laredo, Jennifer Koh, Vinay Parameswaran and Curtis 20/21 Ensemble)
- Crumb, George: Voices From The Heartland
  - George Crumb, composer (Ann Crumb, Patrick Mason, James Freeman and Orchestra 2001)
- Paulus, Stephen: Concerto for Two Trumpets and Band
  - Stephen Paulus, composer (Eric Berlin, Richard Kelley, James Patrick Miller and UMASS Wind Ensemble)
- Sierra, Roberto: Sinfonía No. 4
  - Roberto Sierra, composer (Giancarlo Guerrero and Nashville Symphony)

=== Music Video/Film ===
Best Music Video

- "Happy" – Pharrell Williams
  - We Are From LA, video director; Kathleen Heffernan, Solal Micenmacher, Jett Steiger and Cedric Troadec, video producers
- "We Exist" – Arcade Fire
  - David Wilson, video director; Sue Yeon Ahn and Jason Baum, video producers
- "Turn Down for What" – DJ Snake and Lil Jon
  - Daniel Kwan and Daniel Scheinert, video directors; Judy Craig, Jonathan Wang, Candice Ouaknine and Bryan Younce, video producers
- "Chandelier" – Sia
  - Sia Furler and Daniel Askill, video directors; Jennifer Heath and Jack Hogan, video producers
- "The Golden Age" – Woodkid featuring Max Richter
  - Yoann Lemoine, video director; Kathleen Heffernan, Roman Pichon Herrera, Christine Miller and Annabel Rosier, video producers

Best Music Film

- 20 Feet from Stardom – Darlene Love, Merry Clayton, Lisa Fischer and Judith Hill
  - Morgan Neville, video director; Gil Friesen and Caitrin Rogers, video producers
- On The Run Tour: Beyoncé and Jay-Z (TV Program)
  - Jonas Åkerlund, video director; Ed Burke, Svana Gisla and Dan Parise, video producers
- Ghost Stories – Coldplay
  - Paul Dugdale, video director; Jim Parsons, video producer
- "Metallica Through the Never" – Metallica
  - Nimród Antal, video director; Adam Ellison and Charlotte Huggins, video producers
- The Truth About Love Tour: Live from Melbourne – Pink
  - Larn Poland, video director; Roger Davies, video producer

== Special Merit Awards ==
=== MusiCares Person of the Year ===
- Bob Dylan

=== Lifetime Achievement Award ===
- Bee Gees
- Pierre Boulez
- Buddy Guy
- George Harrison
- Maria Cordero
- Flaco Jiménez
- The Louvin Brothers
- Wayne Shorter

=== Trustees Award ===
- Barry Mann and Cynthia Weil
- Richard Perry
- George Wein

=== Technical Grammy Award ===
- Raymond Kurzweil

=== Music Educator Award ===
- Jared Cassedy (of Windham High School in Windham, New Hampshire)

== Grammy Hall of Fame inductions ==
Title	Artist	Record label	Year of release	Genre	Format
Autobahn	Kraftwerk	Vertigo	1974	Krautrock	Album
"Big Girls Don't Cry"	The Four Seasons	Vee-Jay	1962	Rock	Single
Blood on the Tracks	Bob Dylan	Columbia	1975	Folk Rock	Album
The Bridge	Sonny Rollins	Bluebird	1962	Jazz	Album
Calypso	Harry Belafonte	RCA Victor	1956	Mento	Album
"Dancing Queen"	ABBA	Polar	1976	Europop	Single
Harvest	Neil Young	Reprise	1972	Rock	Album
"Honky Tonkin'"	Hank Williams	MGM	1948	Country	Single
"I Fought the Law"	The Bobby Fuller Four	Mustang	1965	Garage Rock	Single
"Jitterbug Waltz"	Fats Waller & his Rhythm Band	Bluebird	1942	Jazz	Single
John Prine	John Prine	Atlantic	1971	Folk	Album
"Le Freak"	Chic	Atlantic	1978	Disco	Single
Never Mind the Bollocks, Here's the Sex Pistols	Sex Pistols	Virgin	1977	Punk Rock	Album
Nick of Time	Bonnie Raitt	Capitol	1989	Rock	Album
"Rescue Me"	Fontella Bass	Chess	1965	Soul	Single
"San Antonio Rose"	Bob Wills & his Texas Playboys	Vocalion	1939	Western Swing	Single
"School's Out"	Alice Cooper & his Band	Warner Bros.	1972	Rock	Single
The Shape of Jazz to Come	Ornette Coleman	Atlantic	1959	Avant-Garde Jazz	Album
"Sixty Minute Man"	Billy Ward and his Dominoes	Federal	1951	R&B	Single
Songs of Leonard Cohen	Leonard Cohen	Columbia	1967	Contemporary Folk	Album
Stand!	Sly and the Family Stone	Epic	1969	Funk	Album
Stardust	Willie Nelson	Columbia	1978	Pop	Album
"Swing Low, Sweet Chariot"	Fisk Jubilee Singers	Victor	1909	Negro Spiritual	Single
"Swing Low, Sweet Chariot"	Paul Robeson	His Master's Voice	1926	Gospel	Single
"Tell It Like It Is"	Aaron Neville	Par-Lo Records	1966	R&B	Single
"Try a Little Tenderness"	Otis Redding	Atco	1966	Soul	Single
"Walk On the Wild Side"	Lou Reed	RCA	1972	Glam Rock	Single

== In Memoriam ==
- Joe Cocker
- Andraé Crouch
- Pete Seeger
- Jack Bruce
- Johnny Winter
- Bobby Keys
- Ian McLagan
- Tommy Ramone
- Jimmy Ruffin
- Wayne Henderson
- Joe Sample
- Bobby Womack
- Don Covay
- Jesse Winchester
- Robin Williams
- Little Jimmy Dickens
- Jimmy C. Newman
- George Hamilton IV
- Bob Montgomery
- Horace Silver
- Charlie Haden
- Buddy DeFranco
- Paul Horn
- Big Bank Hank
- Frankie Knuckles
- Steven "Asap Yams" Rodriguez
- Casey Kasem
- Gerry Goffin
- Bob Crewe
- Paul Revere
- Bob Casale
- Kim Fowley
- Paco de Lucía
- Gustavo Cerati
- Cheo Feliciano
- Lorin Maazel
- Stephen Paulus
- Ann Ruckert
- Mike Nichols
- Ruby Dee
- Ted Bergmann
- Cosimo Matassa
- Gary Haber
- David Anderle
- Peter Grosslight
- Peter Shukat
- Rod McKuen
- Dallas Taylor
- Tim Hauser
- Maya Angelou

== Multiple nominations and awards ==
The following received multiple nominations:

Six:

- Beyoncé
- Sam Smith
- Pharrell Williams

Five:

- Bob Ludwig

Four:

- Iggy Azalea
- Beck
- Eric Church
- Tom Coyne
- Drake
- Gordon Goodwin
- Jay-Z
- Miranda Lambert
- Sia
- Usher
- Jack White

Three:

- Ryan Adams
- Jhené Aiko
- The Black Keys
- Chris Brown
- Rosanne Cash
- Billy Childs
- Coldplay
- Tehrah
- Andrew Coleman
- Detail
- Eminem
- Ben Glover
- Florian Lagatta
- Lecrae
- Dmitriy Lipay
- Max Martin
- Rick Ross
- Ed Sheeran
- Taylor Swift

Two:

- Arcade Fire
- Francesca Battistelli
- Michael Bishop
- Glen Campbell
- Charli XCX
- Brandy Clark
- Common
- Chick Corea
- Jerry Douglas
- Tom Elmhirst
- Steve Fitzmaurice
- For King & Country
- Childish Gambino
- Ariana Grande
- Michael Graves
- David Greenbaum
- Cole M. Greif-Neill
- Stuart Hawkes
- Fred Hersch
- John Hiatt
- J-Roc
- Keb' Mo'
- Kevin Kadish
- Wiz Khalifa
- Richard King
- Greg Kurstin
- Luke Laird
- Kendrick Lamar
- Mike Larson
- Howard Lawrence
- John Legend
- Morten Lindberg
- Kristen Anderson-Lopez
- Robert Lopez
- Joe Lovano
- Mali Music
- Elaine Martone
- Pete McGuinness
- MercyMe
- Edgar Meyer
- Ann Mincieli
- Nicki Minaj
- Ludovic Morlot
- Jimmy Napes
- Robbie Nelson
- Nickel Creek
- Smokie Norful
- Partch
- Katy Perry
- Tom Petty
- Steve Price
- Julian Raymond
- Rufus Reid
- Robert Glasper Experiment
- Schoolboy Q
- Jesse Shatkin
- Noah "40" Shebib
- Shellback
- Chris Thile
- Darrell Thorp
- Timbaland
- Justin Timberlake
- Meghan Trainor
- Daniil Trifonov
- Cassidy Turbin
- Carrie Underwood
- Keith Urban
- Joe Visciano
- Kanye West
- Charlie Wilson
- Jesse Winchester

The following received multiple awards:

Four:

- Sam Smith

Three:

- Beyoncé
- Rosanne Cash
- Bob Ludwig
- Pharrell Williams

Two:

- Beck
- Chick Corea
- Tom Elmhirst
- Eminem
- For King & Country
- David Greenbaum
- Cole M. Greif-Neill
- Jay-Z
- Florian Lagatta
- Kendrick Lamar
- Kristen Anderson-Lopez
- Robert Lopez
- Jimmy Napes
- Robbie Nelson
- Darrell Thorp
- Cassidy Turbin
- Joe Visciano
- Jack White

== Changes ==
As usual, had a number of small changes in the voting and awarding process:

- New categories

The Best American Roots Performance is a new category in the American Roots genre field. It was presented to the creators of the best performance in this genre field, which includes traditional Northern American (or regional roots) musical styles such as cajun, zydeco, polka and others. Another new category is the Best Roots Gospel Album in the Gospel genre field, for gospel albums in the aforementioned musical styles, including traditional southern Gospel music.

- Changes in the Gospel categories

The Gospel genre field was redefined to make a clearer distinction between the traditional gospel music and the style known as Contemporary Christian Music (CCM). As mentioned above, the Best Roots Gospel Album category is new. The categories in the Gospel field will now be known as Best Gospel Performance/Song, Best Contemporary Christian Music Performance/Song, Best Gospel Album, Best Contemporary Christian Music Album and Best Roots Gospel Album.

- Samples allowed

For the first time, the use of samples and/or interpolations of other works in a new track was permitted in the various songwriters categories. Until now, samples were only allowed in the Best Rap Song category, but these are now also eligible in the Song of the Year, Best Rock Song, Best R&B Song, Best Country Song, Best Gospel Performance/Song, Best Contemporary Christian Music Performance/Song, Best American Roots Song and Best Song Written For Visual Media categories.

- A few minor name changes.

== See also ==
- 21st Screen Actors Guild Awards
- 35th Golden Raspberry Awards
- 87th Academy Awards
- 67th Primetime Emmy Awards
- 68th British Academy Film Awards
- 69th Tony Awards
- 72nd Golden Globe Awards

== Notes ==
1. Tom Petty and Jeff Lynne, writers of the song "I Won't Back Down" (1989) and credited co-writers of "Stay with Me", were given special award certificates by the National Academy of Recording Arts and Sciences in place of a Grammy Award for Song of the Year.
