= Julianna Di Giacomo =

American operatic soprano (born 1975)

Julianna Di Giacomo (born 1975) is an American operatic soprano who has had an active international singing career since 1999. She has performed leading roles with several major opera houses, including La Scala in Milan, the Metropolitan Opera in New York City, the Opéra-Comique in Paris, and the Teatro Real in Madrid. On the concert stage she has appeared with several notable orchestras, including the Gothenburg Symphony Orchestra, the Los Angeles Philharmonic, the New York Philharmonic, the Opera Orchestra of New York, and the Vienna Philharmonic.

== Life and career ==
Raised in Santa Monica, California, Di Giacomo was first introduced to opera by her tennis coach when she was a teenager. She fell in love with the art form and pursued studies in vocal performance at the University of California, Los Angeles. After graduating from UCLA, she entered the Merola Opera Program at the San Francisco Opera (SFO). She made her professional opera debut in 1999 with the Western Opera Theater, the SFO's touring company, as Donna Anna in a national tour of Wolfgang Amadeus Mozart's Don Giovanni.

In 2004 Di Giacomo joined the Young Artist Program at the Santa Fe Opera. Her first career break came in 2006 when she replaced an indisposed Pamela Armstrong as Fiordiligi in Mozart's Così fan tutte at the New York City Opera. She returned to the NYCO the following year in a much lauded portrayal of Elvira in Don Giovanni. She also received positive reviews in 2007 for her performance of Fiora in L'amore dei tre re with the Opera Orchestra of New York at Carnegie Hall and for her portrayal of Leonora in Giuseppe Verdi's Il trovatore at the Caramoor International Music Festival.

Di Giacomo made her debut at the Metropolitan Opera in November 2007 at Clotilde in Bellini's Norma with Dolora Zajick as Adalgisa and Hasmik Papian as Norma. In 2008 she made her debut with Opera Grand Rapids as Countess Almaviva in The Marriage of Figaro. In 2009 she made her first appearance at La Scala as Lucrezia Contarini in I due Foscari conducted by Stefano Ranzani.

In 2010 Di Giacomo returned to the Met as Lina in Stiffelio and Leonora in Il trovatore in 2010. In December 2010 she performed the world premiere of Thomas Pasatieri's Bel Canto Songs for the George London Foundation Recital Series at the Morgan Library. In 2011 he returned to the Caramoor Festival to perform Mathilde in Rossini's Guillaume Tell and portrayed Madame Lidoine in Dialogues of the Carmelites at the Pittsburgh Opera.

In 2012 Di Giacomo made her first appearance with the Los Angeles Opera as Donna Anna to Ildebrando D'Arcangelo's Don Giovanni under conductor Plácido Domingo. That same year she made her debut at the Teatro dell'Opera di Roma in the title role of Bellini's Norma and sang the title role in Giacomo Puccini's Suor Angelica at the Teatro Real in Madrid. In 2013 she made her debut at the Opéra-Comique as Rozenn in Édouard Lalo's Le roi d'Ys.

In 2014 Di Giacomo made her debut with the New York Philharmonic as the soprano soloist in Beethoven's Symphony No. 9, a work she had performed a year earlier with the Vienna Philharmonic. Also in 2014, she made her debut at the San Francisco Opera as Amelia in Un ballo in maschera, appeared at the Hollywood Bowl as Nedda in Pagliacci with the Los Angeles Philharmonic, and portrayed Desdemona in Otello at the Teatro Massimo.

In May 2015 Di Giacomo portrayed the title role in Verdi's Luisa Miller at the Teatro di San Carlo. In June 2015 she portrayed Leonora for her debut with the Cincinnati Opera. In October/November 2015 she is scheduled to sing Desdemona in Verdi's Otello at the Teatro de la Maestranza.

In March/April 2016 she sang the role of Leonora in a semi-staged performance with the San Antonio Opera and the San Antonio Symphony.

Other opera companies Di Giacomo has performed with during her career include the Arizona Opera, the Municipal Theatre of Santiago, the Opéra national de Montpellier, and the Teatro Petruzzelli.

== Discography ==
- Mahler: Symphony No. 8, Simón Bolívar Symphony Orchestra and Los Angeles Philharmonic, Gustavo Dudamel conducting
- Milhaud: L'Orestie d'Eschyle, University of Michigan Symphony, University Choir, Orpheus Singers; Kenneth Kiesler conducting; Dan Kempson, Jennifer Lane, Tamara Mumford, Julianna Di Giacomo, and Brenda Rae
- Verdi: Messa da Requiem, Los Angeles Philharmonic, Gustavo Dudamel conducting; Ildebrando D'Arcangelo, bass; Vittorio Grigolo, tenor; Michelle DeYoung, mezzo-soprano; Julianna Di Giacomo, soprano (C Major DVD & Blu-ray)
