= Call to action =

Call to action or variant thereof, may refer

- Call to Action, a US group advocating change in the doctrine of the Catholic Church
- Call to action (marketing), a key element of many styles of persuasion, also used on the Web
- Call to action (political), a call to activists to participate in a direct action or similar political activity
- "Call to Action" (Supergirl), an episode of Supergirl
- "Call to Action" (Star Wars Rebels)
- A Call to Action: Women, Religion, Violence, and Power (2014 book), book by Jimmy Carter
- Global Leadership Awards — 2005: "A Call to Action", the 2005 edition of the Global Leadership Awards - "A Call to Action"
- Knight Commission — Second report: A Call to Action, 2001 report issued on college athletics in the U.S.A.
- Stan Bush: Call to Action, record from the 1997 Transformers soundtrack album "Till All Are One"

== See also ==
- Call For Action, the name of several consumer helplines
- Call For Action, consumer protection (United States)
