= Darren Tighe =

American college basketball coach

Current position
- Title: Head coach
- Team: Mary
- Conference: NSIC
- Record: 6–23 (.207)

Coaching career (HC unless noted)
- 2007–11: Bethany Lutheran (assistant)
- 2011–12: JWP HS
- 2012–14: Redwood Valley HS (assistant)
- 2014–17: Ridgewater
- 2017–22: Mayville State
- 2023–25: Dakota State
- 2025–present: Mary

Head coaching record
- Overall: 175–129 (.576)

Accomplishments and honors

Championships
- 3 NSAA tournament (2018–2020); NSAA regular season (2021)

Awards
- NSAA Coach of the Year (2021)

Darren Tighe is an American college basketball coach, currently the head men's basketball coach at the University of Mary.

== Early life ==
Tighe received his bachelor's degree in English studies and his master's degree in teaching from Minnesota State University, Mankato.

== Coaching career ==
=== Early coaching career ===
His first coaching job was as an assistant at Bethany Lutheran College from 2007 until 2011. He then spent time coaching at the high school ranks, first as the head coach at Janesville-Waldorf-Pemberton High School for one year, then as an assistant at Redwood Valley High School.

=== Ridgewater ===
In 2014, Tighe was named the head coach at Ridgewater College in Willmar and Hutchinson, Minnesota. In his three seasons at Ridgewater, he led the Warriors to a 48–34 record. During the 2015–16 season, the Warriors won the MCAC Region 13 Consolation Championship.

=== Mayville State ===
Tighe was then hired as the head coach at Mayville State University in Mayville, North Dakota. In his 6 seasons at Mayville State, the Comets achieved an overall record of 76–30. In his first three seasons, the Comets won three straight NSAA tournament championships. The Comets also won the NSAA regular season championship during the 2020–21 season. Following the 2020–21 season, Tighe would be announced as the North Star Athletic Association Coach of the Year. On October 31, 2022, Tighe resigned effective immediately just two games into the 2022–23 season.

=== Dakota State ===
In 2023, Tighe was hired as the head coach at Dakota State University in Madison, South Dakota. He spent two seasons with the Trojans, compiling an overall record of 29–30 (10–17 in the NSAA).

=== Mary ===
On April 8, 2025 it was announced that Tighe would be the next head coach at the University of Mary in Bismarck, North Dakota.

== Head coaching record ==
Record table
Season	Team	Overall	Conference	Standing	Postseason
Ridgewater Warriors (Minnesota College Athletic Conference) (2014–2017)
2014–15	Ridgewater JC	9–18			
2015–16	Ridgewater JC	22–8			
2016–17	Ridgewater JC	17–8			
Ridgewater JC:		48–34 (.585)			
Mavylle State Comets (North Star Athletic Association) (2017–2022)
2017–18	Mayville State	18–11	8–8	T–4th	NAIA DII first round
2018–19	Mayville State	20–9	9–5	T–3rd	NAIA DII first round
2019–20	Mayville State	24–5	11–3	2nd	postseason cancelled
2020–21	Mayville State	14–5	10–3	1st	
2021–22	Mayville State	16–10	8–6	T–3rd	
2022–23	Mayville State	0–2			
Mayville State:		92–42 (.687)	46–25 (.648)		
Dakota State Trojans (North Star Athletic Association) (2023–2025)
2023–24	Dakota State	17–13	6–6	T–3rd	
2024–25	Dakota State	12–17	4–11	6th	
Dakota State:		29–30 (.492)	10–17 (.370)		
Mary Marauders (Northern Sun Intercollegiate Conference) (2025–present)
2025–26	Mary	5–23	3–19	16th / 8th (North)	
2026–27	Mary	1–0	0–0		
Mary:		6–23 (.207)	3–19 (.136)		
Total:		175–129 (.576)			
National champion Postseason invitational champion Conference regular season champion Conference regular season and conference tournament champion Division regular season champion Division regular season and conference tournament champion Conference tournament champion
