= Wave (Beck song) =

Promotional single by Beck

from the album Morning Phase
- Genre: Symphonic rock, ambient
- Length: 3:40
- Label: Capitol
- Songwriter(s): Beck Hansen
- Producer(s): Beck Hansen

"Wave" is a song written, produced and performed by Beck, issued as the first promotional single from his twelfth studio album Morning Phase. Although not released as an official single, the song peaked at number 28 on the Billboard rock chart.

== Critical reception ==
The song has received mixed to positive reviews from critics. Kitty Empire of The Observer complimented the song's string arrangement combined with Beck's vocals. Evan Sawdey of PopMatters and Ryan Dombal of Pitchfork both compared the song to Radiohead's "Pyramid Song", with the former comparing "Wave" positively and the latter comparing it negatively. The song also includes similarities to Björk's song "Hunter".

== Live performances ==
Beck performed the song live for the first time on November 24, 2013 in Los Angeles, backed by the Los Angeles Philharmonic. The song was performed in promotion of Song Reader, his book of sheet music released the previous year, although the song does not actually appear in that book. On March 1, 2014, Beck performed the song on Saturday Night Live.

== Chart positions ==
Chart (2014)	Peak position
US Rock Songs (Billboard)	28
