= Waking Light =

Single by Beck

from the album Morning Phase
- Released: February 4, 2014
- Genre: Folk rock
- Length: 5:01
- Label: Capitol
- Songwriter: Beck Hansen
- Producer: Beck Hansen

Beck singles chronology
"Blue Moon" (2014)	"Waking Light" (2014)	"Say Goodbye" (2014)

Music video
- "Waking Light" on YouTube

"Waking Light" is a song written, produced and performed by American musician Beck. It is the closing track on his twelfth studio album Morning Phase and was issued as the album's second single. The song peaked at number 43 on the Billboard rock chart in 2014.

== Critical reception ==
The song has received positive reviews. Many critics complimented the song's psychedelic style; Marc Hogan of Spin referred to it as "richly orchestrated psych-pop, while Tom Breihan of Stereogum further added that the song was "soulful [and] twinkling" and concluded that it was a "stunning song". Chelsea Conte of Paste called the song "beautifully dreamy".

== Live performances ==
Beck performed "Waking Light" live for the first time (along with "Say Goodbye") on The Tonight Show Starring Jimmy Fallon on March 12, 2014. On October 28, he performed the song on Conan.

== Charts ==
Chart (2014)	Peak position
US Rock Songs (Billboard)	43
