= Morning Phase =

Studio album by Beck
- Released: February 21, 2014
- Recorded: 2012–2013
- Studios: Ocean Way (Hollywood); Ocean Way (Nashville); Blackbird (Nashville); Gang (Paris); RAK (London); Capitol (Hollywood); Sunset Sound (Hollywood); The Library (Los Angeles)
- Genre: Folk rock
- Length: 47:01
- Labels: Capitol; Fonograf
- Producer: Beck Hansen

Beck chronology
Modern Guilt (2008)	Morning Phase (2014)	Colors (2017)

Singles from Morning Phase
- 1. "Blue Moon" Released: January 20, 2014; 2. "Waking Light" Released: February 4, 2014; 3. "Say Goodbye" Released: May 5, 2014; 4. "Heart Is a Drum" Released: July 28, 2014

Morning Phase is the twelfth studio album by American singer Beck. The album was released in February 2014 by his new label, Capitol Records. According to a press release, Morning Phase is a "companion piece" to Beck's 2002 album Sea Change. Almost every credited musician who recorded parts for Sea Change returned to record for Morning Phase, with the sole exception being Sea Change producer Nigel Godrich.

Upon release, the album received critical acclaim and was nominated for five awards at the 57th Annual Grammy Awards, winning three: Album of the Year, Best Engineered Album, Non-Classical and Best Rock Album. Beck performed the album's song "Heart Is a Drum" with Chris Martin at the ceremony.

== Background ==
Beck's previous album, Modern Guilt, was released in 2008, and was the final album released under his Interscope Records contract. In the interim between album releases, Beck worked on a wide variety of projects, including new studio material, most of which went unreleased for several years. In October 2012, bassist and frequent collaborator Justin Meldal-Johnsen commented: "I would estimate that there are currently about three or four albums' worth of material floating around," and Beck himself said that "I wasn't sure if I was going to put out a record – or if I should put out a record. It felt like I was standing still, while everything else was in such flux."

In 2012 and 2013, Beck began to perform live with more regularity than in the years immediately following the Modern Guilt tour. This period also saw new original material. The "I Just Started Hating Some People Today/Blue Randy" single was released in 2012, and he self-released the "Defriended", "I Won't Be Long", and "Gimme" singles in 2013. All three of these songs were standalone releases as 12-inch singles on his own FONOGRAF label. "I Won't Be Long" and "Gimme" were allegedly from an unfinished project from 2009, described as being similar to Odelay. According to Beck, the remaining songs from this project may see a similar release method.

In June 2013, Beck announced the expected release of two new albums for 2014, with one of the two being an "acoustic" album. The press release for the "acoustic" album (along with the news of his contract with Capitol Records) arrived in October 2013, announcing the title as Morning Phase and giving a February 2014 release window. The other still-unfinished album would be planned for a later release. In comparing the production of Morning Phase with his previous album, Beck stated that prior to recording Modern Guilt in 2008, he had suffered a serious spinal injury, and that the recording process for Modern Guilt was like "doing it with both hands tied behind your back. It hurt to sing. I'm whispering through half of those vocals." On the other hand, Beck said that Morning Phase was a much more satisfying experience: "Some of the songs on the new record – I get to shout and yell. I'm like, 'Thank you!' I had a lot of ideas and things I'd been wanting to do. This last year and a half, I feel like I can really do them."

== Recording ==
In 2005, Beck began recording material in Nashville for a new album, but it remained incomplete for several years. It was not until 2012 that he returned to continue the project, this time recording at Third Man Records (which, incidentally had not existed at the time of his previous sessions). Two songs from these new sessions, "I Just Started Hating Some People Today" and "Blue Randy", were released that year as a non-album single on Third Man's Blue Series. Other songs, like "Blackbird Chain", "Country Down", and "Waking Light", were reserved for what would become Morning Phase. In the beginning of 2013, he recorded a great deal of the album in his hometown of Los Angeles in three days, with familiar studio and touring musicians Justin Meldal-Johnsen, Joey Waronker, Roger Joseph Manning, Jr., and Smokey Hormel. The next six months, Beck worked with this material for an album release. His father David Campbell contributed orchestral arrangements for the album, as he had done previously for Sea Change and most of Beck's other albums.

== Promotion ==
On January 20, 2014, the album's first single, "Blue Moon", was released. Beck released the second single from the album, "Waking Light", on February 4, 2014. "Say Goodbye" was released as the third single in the United Kingdom on May 5, 2014. "Heart Is a Drum" was released to United States adult album alternative radio on July 28, 2014, as the fourth single.

== Reception ==
=== Critical ===
Professional ratings
Aggregate scores
Source	Rating
AnyDecentMusic?	7.9/10
Metacritic	81/100
Review scores
Source	Rating
AllMusic	3.5/5 stars
The A.V. Club	B+
The Daily Telegraph	4/5 stars
Entertainment Weekly	A−
The Guardian	4/5 stars
The Independent	4/5 stars
NME	8/10
Pitchfork	6.8/10
Rolling Stone	4.5/5 stars
Spin	8/10

Prior to its release, Morning Phase was placed at number two on Stereogum's list of most anticipated albums of 2014.

Upon its release, the album received acclaim from music critics. At Metacritic, which assigns a normalized rating out of 100 to reviews from mainstream critics, the album received an average score of 81 (based on 46 reviews), indicating "universal acclaim".

At Mojo, James McNair stated that "Morning Phase isn't an album that obsequiously courts your approval [...] it just does." Andy Gill of The Independent wrote that the album is "a deeply satisfying journey, the sadness tempered by the warmth and beauty of the settings, and the gentle determination of the resolution. Accordingly, it's a much better album than Sea Change, just as immersive, but wiser and less indulgently wallowing." According to Reef Younis of Clash magazine, Morning Phase has a "slight, melancholic tone", and "there's an awful lot to love." CraveOnline's Iann Robinson rated the album 9/10, calling it a "proud successor to Sea Change" and "downtempo stroke of genius", and noted that it was some of Beck's best work in years.

=== Commercial ===
Morning Phase debuted at number three on the Billboard 200 albums chart, selling more than 87,000 in its first week, and becoming Beck's second highest charting album in the United States, after Guero (2005). The album also reached top 10 positions in the UK, Canada, Denmark, Switzerland, the Netherlands, Australia and New Zealand.

== Track listing ==
All tracks are written by Beck Hansen.

No.	Title	Length
1.	"Cycle"	0:39
2.	"Morning"	5:19
3.	"Heart Is a Drum"	4:31
4.	"Say Goodbye"	3:29
5.	"Blue Moon"	4:02
6.	"Unforgiven"	4:34
7.	"Wave"	3:40
8.	"Don't Let It Go"	3:09
9.	"Blackbird Chain"	4:26
10.	"Phase"	1:07
11.	"Turn Away"	3:05
12.	"Country Down"	4:00
13.	"Waking Light"	5:00
Total length:		47:01

== Personnel ==
Musicians

- Beck Hansen – vocals, acoustic guitar (tracks 2–5, 8–9, 11–12), keyboards (2), piano (3, 5–6, 13), sound collage (track 3), tambourine (track 4), electric bass (5, 11), ukulele and charango (5), electric guitar (9, 13), celeste (9), dulcimer (11), harmonica (12), synthesizers, organ and glockenspiel (track 13)
- Joey Waronker – drums (tracks 2–3, 5, 8, 12–13), percussion (2–3, 5, 9)
- Roger Joseph Manning, Jr. – piano (tracks 2–3), synthesizers (2), clavinet (3, 5, 9, 13), Rhodes (3), B3 organ and electric piano (12), background vocals (2–3, 5, 9)
- Stanley Clarke – upright bass (track 2), electric bass (3)
- Cody Kilby – guitar (track 4)
- Fats Kaplin – banjo (track 4)
- Bram Inscore – electric bass (track 4)
- James Gadson – drums (tracks 4, 6)
- Justin Meldal-Johnsen – electric bass (tracks 6, 8–9, 12–13)
- Smokey Hormel – acoustic guitar (tracks 6, 8), ebow (6), electric guitar (9, 12)
- Stephanie Bennett – harp (tracks 6, 11)
- Roger Waronker – piano (track 8)
- Steve Richards – cello (track 8)
- Greg Leisz – pedal steel guitar (tracks 9, 12)
- Jason Falkner – electric guitar (tracks 9, 12–13)
- Matt Mahaffey – organ (tracks 9, 13)
- Matt Sherrod – drums (track 9)

Strings

- David Campbell – conductor, orchestrations
- Charlie Bisharat and Sara Parkins (concert master), Kevin Connolly, Julian Hallmark, Tammy Halwan, Natalie Leggett, Grace Oh, Michele Richards, Sarah Thornblade, Josefina Vergara, Nina Evtuhov, Songa Lee, Joel Pargman, Tereza Stainslav – violin
- Roland Kato and Andrew Duckles (principal), Matt Funes, Jeanie Lim – viola
- John E. Acosta and Steve Richards (principal), Rudolph Stein, Suzie Katayama – cello
- David Stone – principal bass
- Strings on "Wave" (track 7)

- Joel Derouin (concert master), Charlie Bisharat, Mario De Leon, Julian Hallmark, Gerry Hilera, Razdan Kuyumjian, Natalie Leggett, Alyssa Park, Tereza Stanislav, Josefina Vergara – violin
- Denyse Buffum, Andrew Duckles, Matt Funes – viola
- Steve Richards (first), Stefanie Fife, Rudy Stein – cello
- David Stone – double bass

Technical

- Beck Hansen – producer
- Darrell Thorp, Cole Marsden Greif-Neill, Cassidy Turbin, David "Elevator" Greenbaum, Florian Lagatta, Joe Visciano, Robbie Nelson – engineer
- Tom Elmhirst – mixing
- Ben Baptie – mixing assistant
- Bob Ludwig – mastering
- Andy West – design
- Dan Moutford – initial cover layout
- Autumn de Wilde – photography
- Dennis Hallinan – city street image

== Accolades ==
Publication	Rank	List
The A.V. Club	14	The 20 Best Albums of 2014
The Daily Telegraph	12	Best 50 Albums of 2014
The Guardian	8	Best Albums of 2014
Mojo	1	50 Best Albums of 2014
musicOMH	7	Top 100 Albums of 2014
The Huffington Post	Unranked	The 23 Best Albums of 2014
Time Out	25	The 30 Best Albums of 2014

Year	Ceremony	Nominated work	Recipient(s)	Category	Result
2015	Grammy Awards	Morning Phase	Beck; Beck Hansen, producer; Tom Elmhirst, David Greenbaum, Florian Lagatta, Cole Marsden, Greif Neill, Robbie Nelson, Darrell Thorp, Cassidy Turbin & Joe Visciano, engineers/mixers; Bob Ludwig, mastering engineer	Album of the Year	Won
2015	Grammy Awards	Morning Phase	Beck	Best Rock Album	Won
2015	Grammy Awards	Morning Phase	Tom Elmhirst, David Greenbaum, Florian Lagatta, Cole Marsden, Greif Neill, Robbie Nelson, Darrell Thorp, Cassidy Turbin & Joe Visciano, engineers; Bob Ludwig, mastering engineer	Best Engineered Album, Non-Classical	Won
2015	Grammy Awards	"Blue Moon"	Beck	Best Rock Performance	Nominated
2015	Grammy Awards	"Blue Moon"	Beck; Beck Hansen, songwriter	Best Rock Song	Nominated

Upon receiving Album of the Year, Morning Phase also beat out Pharrell Williams's G I R L, Beyoncé's self-titled album, Sam Smith's In the Lonely Hour, and Ed Sheeran's x.

== Charts and certifications ==
=== Weekly charts ===
Chart (2014)	Peak position
Australian Albums (ARIA)	5
Austrian Albums (Ö3 Austria)	11
Belgian Albums (Ultratop Flanders)	7
Belgian Albums (Ultratop Wallonia)	10
Canadian Albums (Billboard)	2
Danish Albums (Hitlisten)	3
Dutch Albums (Album Top 100)	5
Finnish Albums (Suomen virallinen lista)	13
French Albums (SNEP)	36
German Albums (Offizielle Top 100)	13
Irish Albums (IRMA)	2
Italian Albums (FIMI)	10
New Zealand Albums (RMNZ)	8
Norwegian Albums (VG-lista)	6
Polish Albums (ZPAV)	30
Portuguese Albums (AFP)	6
Spanish Albums (Promusicae)	34
Swedish Albums (Sverigetopplistan)	41
Swiss Albums (Schweizer Hitparade)	5
UK Albums (Official Charts)	4
US Billboard 200	3
US Top Alternative Albums (Billboard)	1
US Top Rock Albums (Billboard)	1
US Indie Store Album Sales (Billboard)	1

=== Year-end charts ===
Chart (2014)	Position
Belgian Albums (Ultratop Flanders)	109
US Billboard 200	60
US Top Alternative Albums (Billboard)	8
US Top Rock Albums (Billboard)	10

=== Certifications ===
Region	Certification	Certified units/sales
Canada (Music Canada)	Gold	40,000^{^}
United Kingdom (BPI)	Silver	60,000^{‡}
United States (RIAA)	Gold	500,000^{‡}
^{^} Shipments figures based on certification alone.^{‡} Sales+streaming figures based on certification alone.

== Release history ==
Region	Date	Label	Format(s)	Ref
Australia	February 21, 2014	Fonograf; Capitol	Digital download	
Netherlands	February 21, 2014	Fonograf; Capitol	Digital download	
New Zealand	February 21, 2014	Fonograf; Capitol	Digital download	
Argentina	February 21, 2014	Fonograf; Capitol	CD; digital download	
France	February 24, 2014	Fonograf; Capitol	CD; digital download	
United Kingdom	February 24, 2014	Fonograf; Capitol	CD; digital download	
United States	February 25, 2014	Fonograf; Capitol	CD; LP; digital download	
Germany	February 28, 2014	Fonograf; Capitol	CD; LP; digital download	
Poland	March 3, 2014	Universal Poland	CD	
