= Blue Moon (Beck song) =

2014 single by Beck

Single by Beck

from the album Morning Phase
- Released: January 20, 2014
- Length: 4:02 (album version); 3:47 (single edit)
- Label: Capitol
- Songwriter: Beck Hansen
- Producer: Beck Hansen

Beck singles chronology
"I Won't Be Long" (2013)	"Blue Moon" (2014)	"Waking Light" (2014)

Music video
- "Blue Moon" on YouTube

"Blue Moon" is a song written, produced and performed by Beck, issued as the lead single from his twelfth studio album Morning Phase. The song is the musician's first release on Capitol Records (after leaving his previous label, Geffen Records). The song became Beck's first single to top the U.S. Adult Alternative Songs chart, and was nominated for Best Rock Song and Best Rock Performance at the 57th Grammy Awards. Beck performed the song on Ellen and Saturday Night Live.

== Critical reception ==
The song has received positive reviews from critics. Kory Grow of Rolling Stone, while comparing the song's melody to material from Beck's 2002 album Sea Change, called the song "anything but desolate", as well as "lush". Leonie Cooper of NME called the song "one of the most captivating things Beck has ever composed".

== Personnel ==
- Beck Hansen – vocals, piano, acoustic guitar, electric bass, ukulele, charango
- Joey Waronker – drums, percussion
- Roger Joseph Manning, Jr. – clavinet, background vocals

== Charts ==
=== Weekly charts ===
Chart (2014–15)	Peak position
Belgium (Ultratip Bubbling Under Flanders)	34
Canada Rock (Billboard)	28
Japan Hot 100 (Billboard)	36
Mexico Ingles Airplay (Billboard)	38
Portugal (AFP)	47
Poland Airplay (ZPAV)	21
US Bubbling Under Hot 100 (Billboard)	8
US Hot Rock & Alternative Songs (Billboard)	12
US Adult Alternative Airplay (Billboard)	1
US Alternative Airplay (Billboard)	31
US Rock & Alternative Airplay (Billboard)	25

=== Year-end charts ===
Chart (2014)	Position
Japan Adult Contemporary (Billboard)	91
US Adult Alternative Songs (Billboard)	13
