= New Hampshire Symphony Orchestra =

The New Hampshire Symphony Orchestra (NHSO) was an American orchestra, one of three based in Manchester, New Hampshire. It was established in 1974, with conductor James Bolle. Its last listed music director was Kenneth Kiesler.

In early 2007, the NHSO reported that it had sold only 100 of 850 available seats for its February concert. The orchestra subsequently cancelled its season and ceased operation. The official NHSO website had not been updated since 2005, and by 2009 was gone.
