= Beautiful: The Carole King Musical (album) =

Beautiful: The Carole King Musical (Original Broadway Cast Recording)

Cast recording by original Broadway cast of Beautiful: The Carole King Musical
- Released: April 1, 2014
- Recorded: February 27–March 3, 2014
- Studios: MSR, New York City
- Genres: Musical theatre; show tune
- Length: 54:02
- Labels: Ghostlight; Razor & Tie
- Producers: Billy Jay Stein; Jason Howland; Steve Sidwell

Beautiful: The Carole King Musical (Original Broadway Cast Recording) is the cast album for the 2014 Broadway musical Beautiful: The Carole King Musical. Released digitally on April 1, 2014 and physically on May 13, through Ghostlight Records, it featured the cast members performing the songs of Carole King in the Broadway show. The album won the Grammy Award for Best Musical Theater Album in 2015.

== Background ==
Beautiful: The Carol King Musical is based on the songs performed by Carole King and produced for Sony/ATV Music Publishing. The album was announced by Ghostlight Records on February 13, which served as its publisher, and the songs were recorded at the MSR Studios in New York during period between February 27 and March 3, 2014. The cast album featured 25 songs—"Oh Carol", "Be-Bop-A-Lula", "Who Put the Bomp" and the reprised version of "Will You Love Me Tomorrow", were excluded from the track list. Five songs from the album—Some Kind of Wonderful", "Walking in the Rain", "You've Got a Friend", "(You Make Me Feel Like) A Natural Woman" and "Beautiful"—were released exclusively through Entertainment Weekly on March 27, 2014. The album was digitally released through ITunes and other digital formats on April 1, 2014 and in CDs on May 13, 2014.

== Commercial performance ==
Upon its digital release, the album debuted as the number 1 cast recording on iTunes and ranked at 41st position overall. At the Billboard 200 charts, the album debuted at number 60 and topped the Cast Albums chart, post the release of its physical versions.

Time Out ranked this recording at 22nd place on the "best original Broadway cast recordings of the 21st century" list. Further, Chief Drama Critic and Theater Editor David Cote wrote, "The arrangements are lush and soaring, the sound is crisp, and superstar Jessie Mueller, as King, will break your heart."

== Track listing ==
Beautiful: The Carole King Musical (Original Broadway Cast Recording) track listing
No.	Title	Performer(s)	Length
1.	"Overture"	Beautiful Orchestra	1:13
2.	"So Far Away"	Jessie Mueller	1:42
3.	"1650 Broadway Medley"	Beautiful Ensemble	2:00
4.	"It Might as Well Rain Until September"	Mueller	1:47
5.	"Some Kind of Wonderful"	Mueller; Jake Epstein; E. Clayton Cornelious; James Harkness; Douglas Lyons; Alan Wiggins	3:02
6.	"Happy Days Are Here Again"	Anika Larsen	1:05
7.	"Take Good Care of My Baby"	Epstein; Mueller	1:38
8.	"Will You Love Me Tomorrow"	Mueller	3:06
9.	"He's Sure the Boy I Love"	Larsen; Jarrod Spector	1:17
10.	"Will You Love Me Tomorrow"	Ashley Blanchet; Alysha Deslorieux; Carly Hughes; Rashidra Scott	2:25
11.	"Up on the Roof"	Cornelious; Harkness; Lyons; Wiggins	2:12
12.	"On Broadway"	Cornelious; Harkness; Lyons; Wiggins	2:11
13.	"The Locomotion"	Blanchet; Ensemble	2:11
14.	"You've Lost That Lovin' Feeling"	Spector; Josh Davis; Kevin Duda; Ensemble	3:18
15.	"One Fine Day"	Scott; Blanchet; Deslorieux; Hughes; Mueller	2:50
16.	"Chains"	Mueller; Ensemble	1:44
17.	"Walking in the Rain"	Larsen; Spector	2:20
18.	"Pleasant Valley Sunday"	Sara King; Epstein; Ensemble	2:06
19.	"We Gotta Get Out of This Place"	Spector	1:59
20.	"Uptown"	Deslorieux; Lyons; Cornelious; Davis	1:36
21.	"It's Too Late"	Mueller; Lyons; Cornelious; Davis	2:47
22.	"You've Got a Friend"	Mueller; Spector; Larsen; Jeb Brown	2:38
23.	"(You Make Me Feel Like) A Natural Woman"	Mueller; Female Ensemble	2:10
24.	"Beautiful"	Mueller; Ensemble	2:42
25.	"I Feel the Earth Move"	Mueller; Ensemble	2:03
Total length:			54:02

== Chart performance ==
=== Weekly charts ===
Weekly chart performance for Beautiful: The Carole King Musical
Chart (2014)	Peak position
US Billboard 200	60
US Cast Albums (Billboard)	1

=== Year-end charts ===
Year-end chart performance for Beautiful: The Carole King Musical
Chart	Year	Position
US Cast Albums (Billboard)	2014	6
US Cast Albums (Billboard)	2015	5
US Cast Albums (Billboard)	2016	3
US Cast Albums (Billboard)	2017	7
US Cast Albums (Billboard)	2018	10

== Accolades ==
Accolades for Beautiful: The Carole King Musical (Original Broadway Cast Recording)
Award	Date of ceremony	Category	Result	Ref.
Grammy Awards	February 8, 2015	Best Musical Theater Album	Won	
