= Say Goodbye (Beck song) =

Single by Beck

from the album Morning Phase
- Released: May 5, 2014
- Genre: Folk rock
- Length: 3:29
- Label: Capitol
- Songwriter(s): Beck Hansen
- Producer(s): Beck Hansen

Beck singles chronology
"Waking Light" (2014)	"Say Goodbye" (2014)	"Heart Is a Drum" (2014)

"Say Goodbye" is a song written, produced and performed by American musician Beck,.It was issued as the third single from his twelfth studio album Morning Phase.

== Critical reception ==
The song has received positive reviews, with many critics compared the song to the work of other musicians. Leonie Cooper of NME praised the song's guitar work as having "a Gram Parsons lilt"; while Zach Schonfeld of Consequence of Sound positively compared the song to material from Neil Young's album Harvest. Josh Modell of The A.V. Club highlighted the song as being the best song on the album.

== Live performances ==
Beck performed "Say Goodbye" live for the first time (along with "Waking Light") on The Tonight Show Starring Jimmy Fallon on March 12, 2014. On October 5, he performed the song at the New Orleans House of Blues.
