= Heart Is a Drum =

Single by Beck

from the album Morning Phase
- Released: July 24, 2014
- Genre: Psychedelia; chamber folk
- Length: 4:31
- Label: Fonograf; Capitol
- Songwriter(s): Beck Hansen
- Producer(s): Beck

Beck singles chronology
"Say Goodbye" (2014)	"Heart Is a Drum" (2014)	"Dreams" (2015)

"Heart Is a Drum" is a song by American rock musician Beck. It was released on July 24, 2014, as the fourth and final single from his ninth official studio album, Morning Phase. The song peaked at number 18 on the Billboard Bubbling Under Hot 100 Singles chart. Beck performed the song at the 57th Annual Grammy Awards alongside Coldplay band member Chris Martin.

== Music video ==
The video revolves around Beck being stuck in a rural backwoods limbo. While at a house in the middle of nowhere, he sees different versions of himself from the past and future. He also encounters the grim reaper, and a version of himself from the 1993 music video "Loser".

== Track listing ==
Digital download
No.	Title	Length
1.	"Heart Is a Drum"	4:31

== Personnel ==
- Beck – lead and backing vocals, piano, acoustic guitar
- Joey Waronker – drums, percussion
- Stanley Clarke – electric bass

== Charts ==
Chart (2014–15)	Peak position
Mexico Ingles Airplay (Billboard)	47
US Bubbling Under Hot 100 Singles (Billboard)	18
US Adult Alternative Songs (Billboard)	26
