= Brooke Axtell =

American human rights activist and writer

Brooke Axtell is a human rights activist, writer, speaker and performing artist. She was featured in a segment at the 57th Annual Grammy Awards, where she gave a spoken word performance after a speech by US President Barack Obama on domestic violence and before a performance by singer Katy Perry dedicated to domestic violence victims. The idea to have her participate in the segment with the US President and Perry came from Grammys producer Ken Ehrlich.

In an interview with Browbeat, Slate's culture blog, Axtell testified to having been in an abusive relationship, the experience that helped spur her toward activism.

Axtell is now the Director of Communications and Survivor Leadership for Allies Against Slavery, a non-profit devoted to end human trafficking. She founded a healing community called Survivor Healing and Empowerment (S.H.E.) for survivors of rape, abuse and sex trafficking, and serves on The Gender Equality Impact Panel for Katerva, a community that identifies and funds the world’s leading sustainability initiatives. She is a member of the Speaker’s Bureau for Rape, Abuse, Incest, National Network (R.A.I.N.N.), the largest anti-sexual assault organization in the U.S.

Axtell has been featured in Forbes.com, The Wall Street Journal, Psychology Today, BostonGlobe.com, SFGate.com, Washingtontimes.com and Fox News Channel Online.
