= A Very Grammy Christmas =

Christmas-themed television special

- Genre: Christmas
- Starring: Ariana Grande; Maroon 5; Tim McGraw; Pharrell Williams
- Country of origin: United States
- Original language: English
- No. of episodes: 1

Original release
- Network: CBS
- Release: December 5, 2014

A Very Grammy Christmas was a Christmas-themed television special that aired on CBS on December 5, 2014. Guests included Ariana Grande, Maroon 5, Tim McGraw and Pharrell Williams. It received 4.73 million viewers and a 0.8/3 rating/share.

== See also ==
- 57th Annual Grammy Awards
- List of United States Christmas television specials
