= Janesville-Waldorf-Pemberton High School =

Public high school in Minnesota

Coordinates: 44.1190°N 93.7068°W

Location
- 110 East Third Street; Janesville, (Waseca County), Minnesota 56048; United States

Information
- Other name: JWP
- Type: Public high school
- Principal: David Rysdam
- Staff: 25.19 (FTE)
- Enrollment: 339 (2023-2024)
- Student to teacher ratio: 13.46
- Colors: Royal blue and silver
- Athletics conference: Gopher Conference
- Nickname: Bulldogs

Janesville-Waldorf-Pemberton High School is a public school in Janesville, Minnesota, United States. JWP stands for Janesville, Waldorf, and Pemberton, the towns the school district covers. The school building holds all grades K-12. School colors are blue and silver. JWP's mascot is the Bulldog. They are one of 12 teams in the Gopher Conference. The 9-12 enrollment is a little over 200.

The Grammy-winning opera tenor Aaron Sheehan is an alumnus of the school.
