= L'Orestie d'Eschyle =

Opera by Darius Milhaud

- Opera by Darius Milhaud
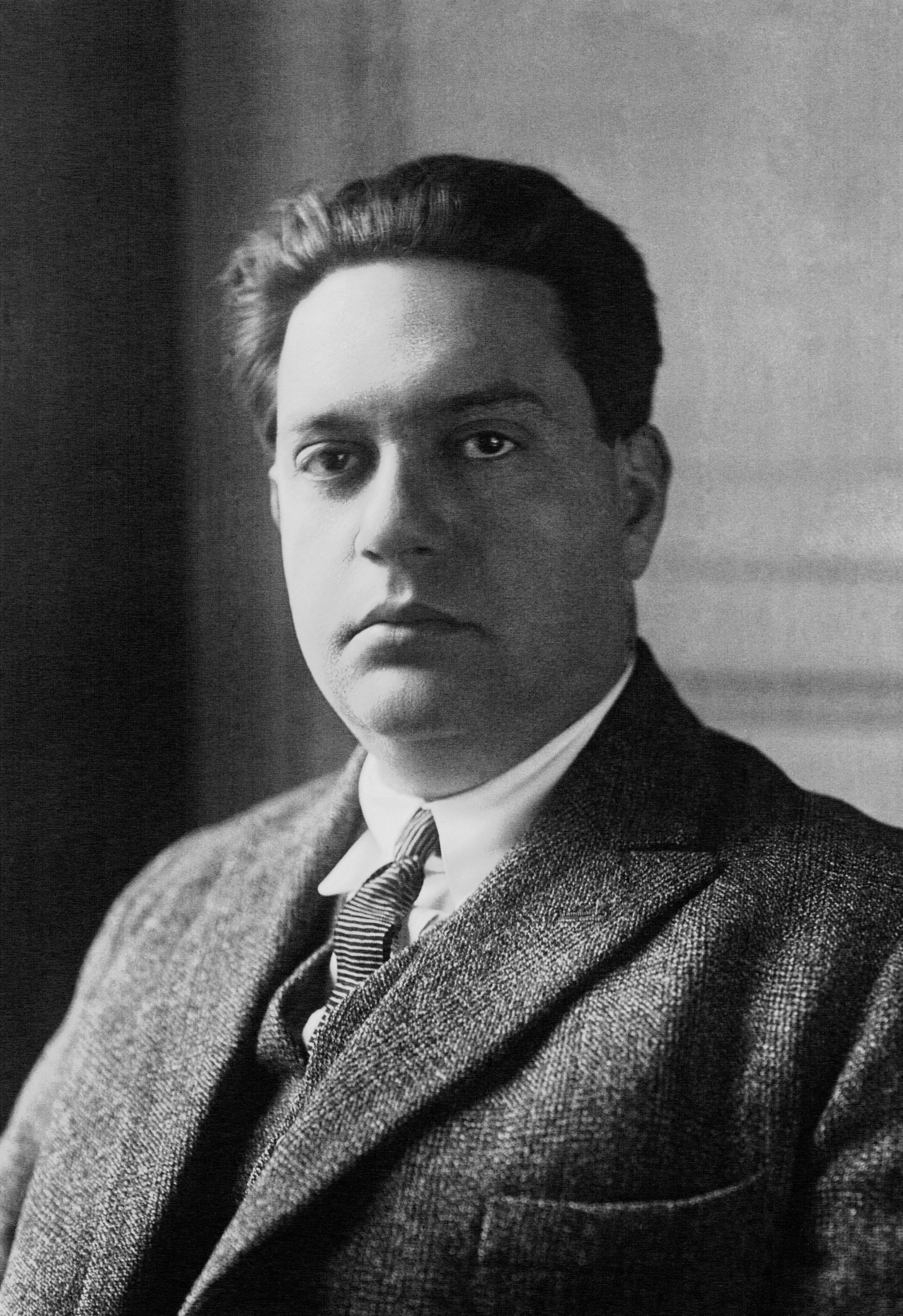
- Milhaud in 1923
- Librettist: Paul Claudel
- Language: French
- Based on: The Oresteia
- Premiere: 1936; Berlin

L'Orestie d'Eschyle is a French-language opera by Darius Milhaud based on The Oresteia triptych by Aeschylus in a French translation by his collaborator Paul Claudel.

Milhaud set a scene of the first play, Agamemnon, for soprano and chorus in 1913. The second part, Les Choéphores (The Libation Bearers), dates from 1915–16. The very extensive third part, Les Euménides (The Furies), was completed in 1923. The opera was partially performed in March 1931, but not performed complete till 1963 in Berlin.

== Recording ==
The opera's premiere recording took place in 2014.

- L'Orestie - Lori Phillips (Clytemnestra, soprano), Dan Kempton (Orestes, baritone), Sidney Outlaw (baritone), Sophie Delphis (speaker), Brenda Rae (soprano), Tamara Mumford (mezzo-soprano), Jennifer Lane (contralto), Julianna Di Giacomo (soprano), Kristin Eder (mezzo-soprano), Chamber Choir, University Choir, Orpheus Singers, UMS Choral Union, Percussion Ensemble, University of Michigan Symphony Orchestra, Kenneth Kiesler. Naxos 2014
