= Aaron Sheehan =

American opera singer

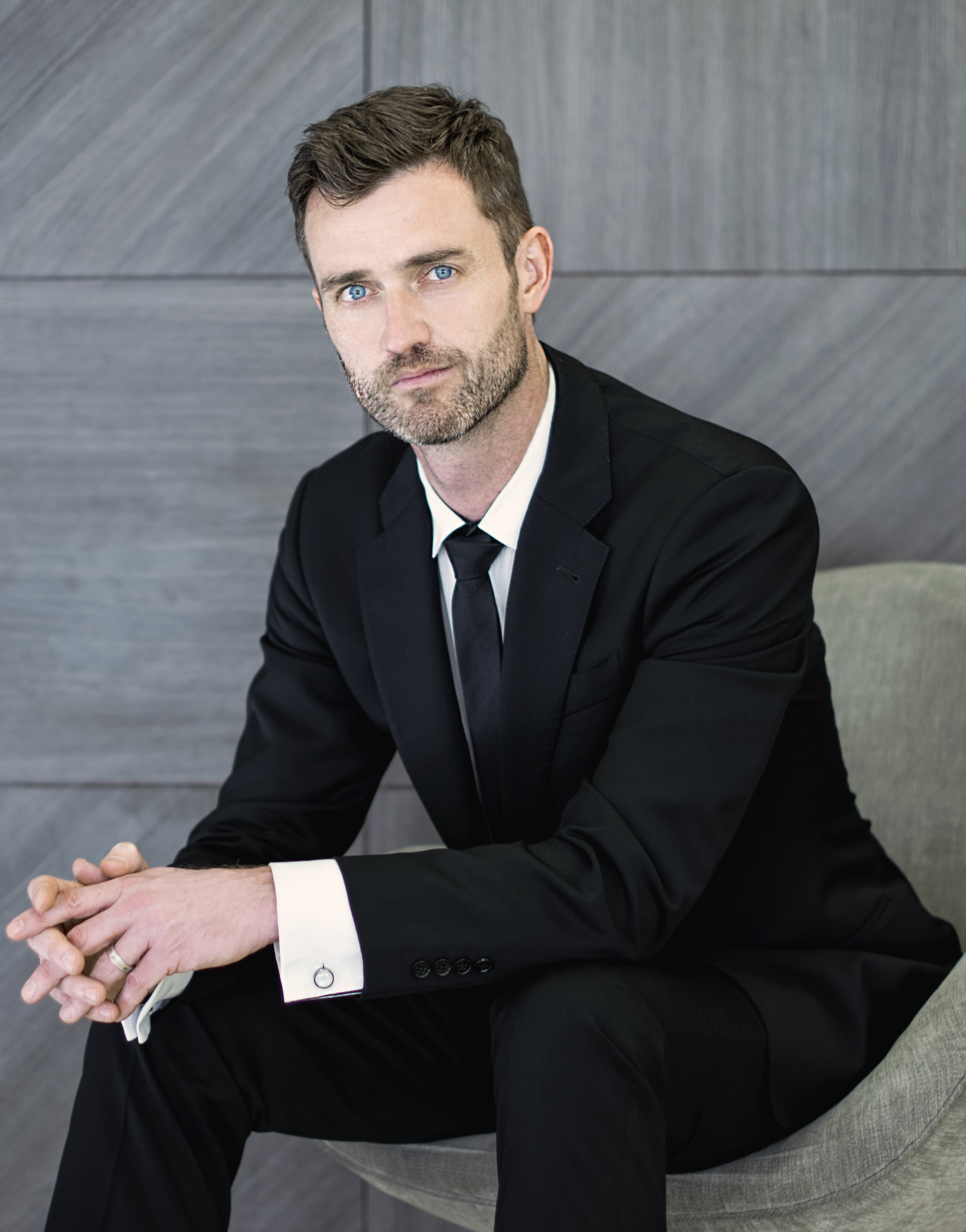
- Born: 1975 (age 50–51); Janesville, Minnesota
- Occupation: Opera singer
- Years active: 2001–present
- Website: aaronsheehantenor.com

Aaron Sheehan (born 1975) is an American classical singer (tenor) and professor of music who has been described as one of "the leading Early Music singers in the world". He was one of the recipients of the 2015 Grammy Award for Best Opera Recording.

== Early life and education ==
A native of Janesville, Minnesota, Sheehan began singing in 1994, his final year at Janesville-Waldorf-Pemberton High School, after spending his early years as an instrumental musician. He continued singing at Luther College, where he earned a Bachelor of Arts, and went on to receive a Master of Music in early music performance at Indiana University Bloomington.

== Career ==
Following graduate school, Sheehan moved to Boston, Massachusetts, to launch his professional singing career. His opera debut came in 2005 when he appeared as Ivan in the Boston Early Music Festival's premiere of Johann Mattheson's Boris Goudenow. Sheehan went on to tour and perform extensively in Europe, South America, and the United States.

Sheehan performed on the Boston Early Music Festival's recording of Charpentier’s La descente d'Orphée aux enfers, which received the Grammy Award for Best Opera Recording in 2015. The following year he appeared on two recordings nominated for the Grammy for Best Opera Recording: Il ritorno d'Ulisse in patria (with Boston Baroque) and Niobe, regina di Tebe (with the Boston Early Music Festival).

As of 2017, Sheehan is teaching at Boston University as lecturer in Music, Historical Performance, Voice. He also teaches voice at Wellesley College.

According to Sheehan, he has been most inspired by Aksel Schiøtz and Anthony Rolfe Johnson.

=== Reception ===
Sheehan has been described as "one of the leading Early Music singers in the world" by Marion Dry, the director of Wellesley College's music performance program. The Boston Globe has lauded Sheehan as "superb: his tone classy, clear, and refined, encompassing fluid lyricism and ringing force". In a review of the Boston Early Music Festival's 2015 staging of Monteverdi's L'Orfeo, The New York Times wrote that Sheehan "brought shining quality and deep sensitivity to the title role". During the Dallas Bach Society's performance of Messiah, the Dallas Morning News called Sheehan the "best of the soloists", describing him as having an "agreeably fibrous tenor deployed to great expressive effect".

== Selected recordings ==
- Marc-Antoine Charpentier, La Descente d'Orphée aux enfers H.488, Aaron Sheehan, Orphée, Amanda Forsythe, Eurydice, Teresa Wakim, Jesse Blumberg, Boston Early Music Festival, Vocal & Chamber Ensembles, conducted by Paul O’Dette & Stephen Stubbs (CPO 2014) Grammy Award For Best Opera Recording 2015

== Personal life ==
Sheehan has three siblings.
