= La descente d'Orphée aux enfers =

Opera by Marc-Antoine Charpentier

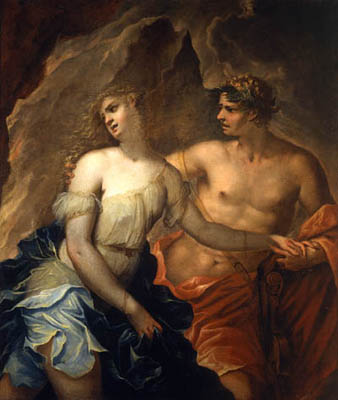
Orpheus & Eurydice

La descente d'Orphée aux enfers H.488 (English: The Descent of Orpheus to the Underworld) is an incomplete chamber opera in two acts by the French composer Marc-Antoine Charpentier. It was probably composed in early 1686 and performed either in the apartments of the Dauphin that spring or at Fontainebleau in the autumn. Charpentier himself sang the title role, joined by musicians of Mademoiselle de Guise and members of the Dauphin's little ensemble; it was Charpentier's last appearance with this ensemble.

The libretto, whose author is unknown, is based on the myth of Orpheus as told by Ovid in Book 10 of the Metamorphoses. It is debatable whether the opera as it survives in the manuscript is complete or not. The musicologist H. Wiley Hitchcock believes Charpentier may have planned (and composed) a third, concluding act.

The opera is not to be confused with an earlier work, by Charpentier, Orphée descendant aux enfers H.471, which is a cantata for three male voices, 2 violins, recorder, flute, and bc.

== Roles ==
Role	Voice type	Premiere Cast, 1686 or 1687 (Conductor: – )
Orphée	haute-contre	François Antoine
Euridice	soprano	
Pluton	bass-baritone	
Proserpine	soprano	
Ixion	haute-contre	Marc-Antoine Charpentier
Apollon	bass-baritone	
Aréthuze	alto	
Tantale	tenor	
Daphné	soprano	
Énone	soprano	
Titye	bass-baritone	

== Synopsis ==
=== Act 1 ===
Orphée (Orpheus) is celebrating his marriage to Euridice (Eurydice) in a beautiful, pastoral landscape. Euridice and her nymph companions gather flowers, but Euridice steps on a snake, is bitten, and dies. Encouraged by his father Apollon (the god Apollo) Orpheus decides to follow Euridice to the underworld and rescue her.

=== Act 2 ===
Orpheus arrives in the underworld where he sees Tantale (Tantalus), Ixion and Titye (Tityus) being punished eternally for their crimes. Orpheus' singing allays their suffering. His music also wins over Pluton (Pluto, the god of the underworld), who allows him to return with Euridice to the world of the living providing he does not turn back to look at her before they have left the realm of the dead.

== Selected recordings ==
- Paul Agnew, Orphée, Sophie Daneman, Eurydice, Patricia Petibon, Les Arts Florissants, conducted by William Christie (Erato, 1995)
- Aaron Scheehan, Orphée, Amanda Forsythe, Eurydice, Teresa Wakim, Jesse Blumberg, Boston Early Music Festival, Vocal & Chamber Ensembles, conducted by Paul O’Dette & Stephen Stubbs (CPO 2014) Grammy Award For Best Opera Recording 2015
- Robert Getchell, Orphée, Violaine Le Chenadec, Eurydice, Ensemble Correspondences, conducted by Sébastien Daucé (Harmonia MUNDI 2016)
- Cyril Auvity, Orphée, Céline Scheen, Eurydice, Floriane Hasler, Proserpine, Etienne Bazola, Pluton, Ensemble Desmarest, conducted by Ronan Khalil (Glossa, 2018)
- Reinoud Van Mechelen, Orphée, Déborah Cachet, Euridice, Stéfanie True, Proserpine, directed by Lionel Meunier and Reinoud Van Mechelen, Vox Luminis a nocte temporis, (with Orphée descendant aux enfers H.471, cantata). (Alpha, 2020). Diamant Opéra magazine
