= Joe Visciano =

- Occupations: Mixing Engineer, Recording Engineer
- Website: joevisciano.com

Joe Visciano is an American Grammy Award-winning Mixing Engineer & Recording Engineer, based in Brooklyn, New York, United States.

== Recognition ==
- 2015 Grammy Winner Album of the Year, Morning Phase, Beck
- 2015 Grammy Winner Best Engineered Album, Non Classical, Morning Phase, Beck
- 2015 Grammy Winner Best Rock Album, Morning Phase, Beck
- 2017 Grammy Winner Record of the Year, 25, Adele
- 2017 Grammy Winner Album of the Year, 25, Adele
- 2021 Grammy Nomination Album of the Year, Montero, Lil Nas X
- 2021 Grammy Nomination Album of the Year, Planet Her, Doja Cat
- 2021 Grammy Nomination Record of the Year, "Kiss Me More", Doja Cat (feat. SZA)
- 2021 Grammy Participation (Winner) Best Pop Duo/Group Performance "Kiss Me More", Doja Cat (feat. SZA)
- 2022 Grammy Nomination Album of the Year, Mr. Morale & the Big Steppers, Kendrick Lamar
- 2022 Grammy Participation (Winner) Rap Album of the Year, Mr. Morale & the Big Steppers, Kendrick Lamar
- 2023 Grammy Participation (Winner) Best Progressive R&B Album, SOS, SZA

== Select Discography ==
- Summer Walker - "Heart of a Woman" (Mixer)
- Vince Staples - Dark Times (Album Mixer)
- Rosalia ft. Ralphie Choo - "Omega" (Mixer)
- Earl Sweatshirt - Feet of Clay (Album Mixer)
- Sza - "Good Days" (Vocal Mixer)
- Lil Nas X - Montero (Mixer 12,14)
- Omar Apollo - God Said No (Mixer 1,9,10)
- Action Bronson - Johan Sebastion Bachlava the Doctor (Engineer, Album Mixer)
- Action Bronson - El Cocodrillo Turbo (Engineer, Album Mixer)
- Action Bronson - Only For Dolphins (Engineer, Album Mixer)
- Lake Street Dive - Free Yourself Up (Album Mixer)
- Doja Cat ft. Sza (Additional Mixing)
- Kendrick Lamar - Mr. Moral & the Big Steppers (Engineer - Vol 1. Track 2 & Vol. 2 Track 6)
- Lola Indigo ft. Mauel Turizo - "1000cosas' (Mixer)
- Foy Vance ft. Ed Sheeran, Keith Urban, Elton John - "Guiding Light (Anniversary Edition)" (Mixer)
- Navy Blue - Memoirs In Armour (Engineer, Album Mixer)
- Orion Sun - Hold Space For Me (Album Mixer)
- Wet - Letter Blue (Album Mixer)
- Berhana - Amen (Album Mixer)
- Sienna Spiro - Sink Now, Swim Later (Mixer 1,6,7,8)
- Wilder Woods - Wilder Woods (Album Mixer)
- Dispatch - America, Location 12 (Album Mixer)
- Foy Vance - Signs of Life (Album Mixer)
- Sen Senra - PO2054AZ Vol. 1 (Album Mixer)
- Nick Ward - House With The Blue Door (Album Mixer)
- Syml - Syml (Album Mixer)
- Beck - Morning Phase (Engineering)
- Frank Ocean - Blonde (Engineer & Mix Assistant)
- Adele - 25 (Engineer & Mix Assistant)
- Mark Ronson - Uptown Special (Engineer & Mix Assistant)
- The Arcs - Yours Dreamily (Engineering)
