= Brenda Rae =

American operatic soprano

- Born: February 8, 1982 (age 43); Appleton, Wisconsin, U.S.
- Education: University of Wisconsin–Madison
- Occupation: Operatic soprano
- Organizations: Frankfurt Opera

Brenda Rae (born February 8, 1982) is an American operatic soprano who has performed leading roles in opera houses internationally. She was a resident artist at the Frankfurt Opera from 2008 through 2017. She is a featured performer on the Naxos Records 2015 recording of Milhaud's L'Orestie d'Eschyle, which was nominated for the Grammy Award for Best Opera Recording.

== Life and career ==
Born and raised in Appleton, Wisconsin, Rae is a graduate of the University of Wisconsin–Madison (Bachelor of Music, 2004) and the Juilliard School (Master of Music, 2006). In the summer of 2008, Rae attended the conservatory program at the Music Academy of the West, before joining the Ensemble of the Oper Frankfurt.

While a student at Juilliard she portrayed roles in several productions of the Juilliard Opera Center, including Mary Shrike in the world premiere of Lowell Liebermann's Miss Lonelyhearts (2006), Eurydice in Offenbach's Orpheus in the Underworld (2006), Arminda in Mozart's La finta giardiniera (2007), and the Countess Adele in Rossini's Le comte Ory (2007). In 2013 she made her debut at Carnegie Hall as Polissena in Handel's Radamisto with David Daniels in the title role and conductor Harry Bicket leading The English Concert orchestra. That same year she made her debut at the Santa Fe Opera as Violetta in Verdi's La traviata. She returned to Santa Fe in 2014 as Donna Anna in Mozart's Don Giovanni and The Cook in Le Rossignol. In 2015 she portrayed the title role in Handel's Semele at the Seattle Opera. In 2017 she sang the title role in Donizetti's Lucia di Lammermoor at Santa Fe.

Rae has performed in many operas at the Frankfurt Opera, beginning with her debut there in 2008 as a member of the ensemble, and as a guest after 2017. Her other performances there include Aithra in Die agyptische Helena by Richard Strauss (2015), Amina in Bellini's La sonnambula (2014–2015), Angelica in Vivaldi's Orlando furioso, Anne Trulove in Stravinsky's The Rake's Progress (2012), Cleopatra in Handel's Giulio Cesare (2012–2013), Eternità and Giunone in Cavalli's La Calisto (2011–2012), Fiordiligi in Mozart's Così fan tutte (2014), Helmwige in Wagner's Die Walküre (2012), Konstanze in Mozart's Die Entführung aus dem Serail (2011), Lora in Wagner's Die Feen (2011), Musetta in Puccini's La bohème (2012), Olympia in Offenbach's The Tales of Hoffmann (2011), Pamina in Mozart's Die Zauberflöte (2011), Servilia in his La clemenza di Tito (2011), Violetta in Verdi's La traviata (2011), Zerbinetta in Ariadne auf Naxos by Richard Strauss (2013–2014), and the title roles in Donizetti's Maria Stuarda (2012) and Lucia di Lammermoor (2015–2016), among others.

Rae's other European performances include appearances at the Bavarian State Opera (debut as Konstanze, 2012), Glyndebourne Festival Opera (Arminda in Handel's Rinaldo, 2011), Grand Théâtre de Bordeaux (Zerbinetta, 2011), and the Théâtre des Champs-Élysées (debut as Polissena in Handel's Radamisto, 2013) among others. In 2017, she appeared as Amenaide in Rossini's Tancredi with Opera Philadelphia.

Rae made her Metropolitan Opera debut in 2020, in the role of Poppea in Handel's Agrippina. Other roles at the Metropolitan include the title role in Alban Berg's Lulu, Zerbinetta in Ariadne auf Naxos by Richard Strauss, and Ophelia in Brett Dean's Hamlet.

Rae was to appear as Rosina in Rossini's Il Barbiere di Siviglia but the Met's 2020–2021 season was cancelled in response to the COVID-19 pandemic. In 2021, Rae was a recipient of the Met's Beverly Sills Artist Award. Usually given to one artist each year, five awards were presented that year in recognition of the economic impact the pandemic had on singers.
