= Kenneth Kiesler =

American conductor (born 1953)

- Born: August 18, 1953 (age 73); New York City, New York, U.S.
- Education: University of New Hampshire; Peabody Conservatory of Music
- Occupations: Conductor; Music director Professor of conducting
- Years active: 1970s–present
- Employer: University of Michigan
- Known for: Music director of the Illinois Symphony Orchestra; Founder of the Conductors Retreat at Medomak; Grammy Award nomination for Milhaud's L'Orestie d'Eschyle
- Children: 3

Kenneth Kiesler (born August 18, 1953) is an American symphony orchestra and opera conductor and mentor to conductors. Kiesler is conductor laureate of the Illinois Symphony Orchestra where he was music director from 1980 to 2000 and founder and director of the Conductors Retreat at Medomak. In 2014, Kiesler was nominated for a Grammy Award for his recording of Darius Milhaud's opera L'Orestie d'Eschyle. He is director of orchestras and professor of conducting at the University of Michigan.

== Early life and education ==
Kenneth Kiesler was born in New York City. His father, Harry Isiah Kiesler, was of Polish/Austrian descent and his mother, Rose Segal Kiesler, was of French and German descent. He studied music from an early age; he played trumpet, sang in choruses and, at age 15, Kiesler conducted his first concert, Benjamin Britten's Ceremony of Carols when the director took ill prior to the concert. Kiesler graduated from Nanuet Senior High School in 1971.

Kiesler studied music at the University of New Hampshire where he received the Bachelor of Music cum laude in conducting and music history in 1975. He received his master's degree in orchestra conducting in 1980 from the Peabody Conservatory of Music, Johns Hopkins University. At age 19, he conducted the first performance of Gershwin's original jazz-band score of Rhapsody in Blue since 1925, with permission of Ira Gershwin and Warner Brothers Music, which garnered national attention. Kiesler was recipient of a conducting fellowship at the Aspen Music School and his teachers and mentors have included Fiora Contino, Julius Herford, John Nelson, Erich Leinsdorf, James Wimer, and Carlo Maria Giulini.

Kiesler was a participant in the League of American Orchestras' 1990 Leonard Bernstein American Conductors Program with the National Symphony Orchestra at the Kennedy Center and the 1991 Carnegie Hall Centenary conducting class with Pierre Boulez and Ensemble intercontemporain.

== Career ==
Kiesler is also a sought-after mentor and teacher to conductors. The French music critic Roger Bouchard said of him, "There do exist great American conductors, and Kiesler is one of them! Standing on behalf of the music he serves, he conducts from memory with unaffected gestures both precise and passionate. Nothing is unnecessary in his conducting; yet everything is there. Very beautiful work!"

Kiesler is the conductor of many acclaimed recordings on the Naxos, Dorian, Equilibrium and Pierian labels; with the BBC Singers in London, Third Angle New Music Ensemble, and both the University of Michigan Symphony Orchestra and Opera Theatre. Kiesler was nominated for a Grammy for his recording of Darius Milhaud's opera L'Orestie d'Eschyle which was nominated for Best Opera Recording in 2014. This is the first recording of Milhaud's complete Orestiean Trilogy of Aeschylus based on a libretto of Paul Claudel.

Kiesler has conducted many of the world's leading ensembles including the Chicago Symphony Orchestra, Washington's National Symphony Orchestra, Detroit Symphony Orchestra, Utah Symphony, Indianapolis Symphony Orchestra, New Jersey Symphony, San Diego Symphony, Orchestre de chambre de Paris, Jerusalem Symphony Orchestra and Haifa Symphony Orchestra in Israel, Osaka Philharmonic Orchestra in Japan, Daejeon Philharmonic Orchestra and Pusan Symphony Orchestra in Korea, Zhejiang Symphony Orchestra in China, New Symphony Orchestra in Bulgaria, Jalisco Philharmonic Orchestra in Mexico, OSESP in São Paulo, Brazil, Puerto Rico Symphony Orchestra in San Juan, Albany Symphony Orchestra, Florida Symphony Orchestra, Fresno Philharmonic Orchestra, Long Beach Symphony Orchestra, Long Island Philharmonic Orchestra, Memphis Symphony Orchestra, New Hampshire Symphony Orchestra, Omaha Symphony Orchestra, Portland Symphony Orchestra, Richmond Symphony Orchestra, Virginia Symphony Orchestra. He has conducted at the Aspen, Atlantic, Breckenridge, Meadowbrook, Sewanee and Skaneateles music festivals.

Kiesler served as music director of the Illinois Symphony Orchestra from 1980 to 2000, during which time he founded the Illinois Symphony Chorus, the Illinois Chamber Orchestra, and led debuts at Lincoln Center and Carnegie Hall. He was also assistant conductor of the Indianapolis Symphony Orchestra from 1980 to 1983, music director and conductor of the South Bend Symphony Orchestra from 1984 to 1988 and principal conductor of the Saint Cecilia Orchestra from 1992 to 1995. From 2002 to 2007 Kiesler was music director of the New Hampshire Symphony Orchestra.

Kiesler has conducted Britten's Peter Grimes, Rossini's Il turco in Italia at the Opera Theatre of Saint Louis, Orff's Carmina Burana at Syracuse Opera and Bright Sheng's The Silver River in Singapore as well as operas of Menotti, Mozart, Puccini, Ravel, Stravinsky and Verdi among others.

Kiesler's advocacy for new music and living composers has included conducting more than 15 world and American premieres by composers James Aikman, Leslie Bassett, Paul Brantley, Evan Chambers, Sven Daigger, Gabriella Lena Frank, Aharon Harlap, James P. Johnson, Ben Johnston, Vítězslava Kaprálová, Kristin Kuster, Stephen Rush, Gunther Schuller and Steven Stucky. His notable premieres and new music performances include conducting the 1990 world premiere in Illinois and the New York premiere at Carnegie Hall of Gunther Schuller's Concerto for 2 Pianos, 3 Hands, which was written for pianists Lorin Hollander and Leon Fleisher, and performed with the Illinois Chamber Orchestra. Kiesler conducted the U.S. premiere of Felix Mendelssohn's Piano Concerto No. 3 with pianist Anton Nel in 1997. In 2002, he premiered the score reconstruction by James Dapogny of the opera De Organizer by James P. Johnson and Langston Hughes which was the first performance since 1940. In 2006, he also conducted the world premiere of Johnson's The Dreamy Kid; libretto by Eugene O'Neill. Kiesler conducted the world premiere of The Old Burying Ground a song cycle for soprano, tenor, folksinger and orchestra by Evan Chambers in 2007, which was subsequently recorded in 2008.

=== Teacher ===
Since 1995, Kiesler has been professor of conducting and director of orchestras at the University of Michigan School of Music, Theatre & Dance. He is a sought after teacher and mentor of conductors internationally. Kiesler has been director of conducting programs of international master classes Berlin since 2012. From 2006 to 2012, he was the Director of the Conductors Programme of Canada's National Arts Centre Orchestra. He was director of the Vendome International Academy of Orchestral Conducting in Paris and Vendôme France from 2006 to 2010. Kiesler directed the orchestras while serving as visiting artist and advisor in orchestral studies at the Manhattan School of Music from 2006 to 2010.

Kiesler has led many conducting master classes in the United States and internationally, including for the League of American Orchestras, the Conductors' Guild, the Minister of Culture of Mexico, Berlin Philharmonic Chamber Orchestra and for the Deutscher Musikrat in Germany, as well as at the Royal Academy of Music in London, Oxford University, the Waterville Valley Music Center and in the cities of Chicago, Houston, Leipzig, Moscow, Rome, São Paulo and Salt Lake City.

Kiesler's conducting students have won prizes in the Donatella Flick London Symphony Conducting Competition (Elim Chan), Nikolai Malko Conducting Competition (Mei-Ann Chen), Maazel-Vilar Conducting Competition (Joana Carneiro, Bundit Ungrangsee), Eduardo Mata Conducting Competition (Yaniv Dinur), and hold positions with orchestras, opera companies and educational institutions worldwide. Another notable student of his is Alondra de la Parra.

Kiesler is the founder and director of the Conductors Retreat at Medomak, an annual, intensive program which develops conductors' artistic sensibilities and technical skills, as well as personal attributes and leadership capacity. It takes place at the site of the historic Medomak camp in Maine, where Kiesler himself spent many formative summers in his youth. Since 1997 the Conductors Retreat at Medomak has attracted conductors from around the world for instruction in conducting, score study, aural skills and physical expression.

== Awards and recognitions ==
Kiesler has been awarded:

- 1986: Silver Medal, Stokowski Competition
- 1987: Mayor's Award for the Arts, Springfield, Illinois
- 1987: Governor's Arts Award, Illinois
- 1988: Helen M. Thompson Award, presented by the American Symphony Orchestra League to the outstanding American music director under the age of 35
- 2000: State of Illinois General Assembly Legislation (Proclamation)
- 2011: The American Prize in Orchestral Performance/Conducting
- 2014: Grammy nomination for his recording of Milhaud's L'Orestie d'Eschyle with the University of Michigan Symphony Orchestra, percussion ensemble, choirs and soloists released by Naxos

== Publications ==
Kiesler contributed to the content in:

- Saler, Thomas D. (2010). Serving Genius – Carlo Maria Giulini. Urbana: University of Illinois Press. ISBN 978-0-252-03502-9.

He is also included and referenced in:

- Wagar, Jeannine (1991). Conductors in Conversation – Fifteen Contemporary Conductors Discuss Their Lives and Profession. Boston, Massachusetts: G. K. Hall. ISBN 0-8161-8996-X – via Internet Archive.
- Ho, Allan B.; Feofanov, Dmitry (2006). Shostakovich Reconsidered (paperback ed.). London: Toccata press. ISBN 978-0-907689-57-7.
- Sherman, Robert (2010). Leonard Bernstein at Work – His Final Years, 1984–1990. photographs by Steve J. Sherman. Milwaukee, Wisconsin: Amadeus Press. ISBN 978-1-57467-190-2.

== Personal life ==
Kiesler is the father of three children, Laura, Adam and Aliyah. He currently resides in Ann Arbor, Michigan.

== Selected discography ==
- Levy: Shir Shel Moshe (Song of Moses) / BBC Singers, Kiesler, Naxos (2004)
- Bolcom, Bassett, Daugherty: Concertos / Kiesler, Et Al, Equilibrium (2004)
- Ben-Amots: Celestial Dialogues / Hashkivenu, Milken Archive, Naxos (2004)
- Ellstein: The Golem (scenes), Jewish Operas, Vol. 1, Milken Archive, Naxos (2004)
- Amram: Shir L'erev Shabbat / The Final Ingredient, Milken Archive, Naxos (2004)
- Schoenfield: The Merchant and the Pauper, Milken Archive, Naxos (2004)
- Weinberg: Shabbat Ba'aretz, Milken Archive, Naxos (2005)
- Schiff: Gimpel the Fool (scenes), Jewish Operas, Vol. 2, Milken Archive, Naxos (2006)
- Schiff: Gimpel the Fool (complete) Third Angle, Naxos (2007)
- Evan Chambers: The Old Burying Ground / Kiesler, University of Michigan Symphony Orchestra, Dorian Sono Luminus (2010)
- Nissman plays Ginastera: The Three Piano Concertos, Pierian (2013)
- Milhaud: L'Orestie d'Eschyle, University of Michigan Symphony Orchestra, percussion ensemble and choirs, Naxos (2014)
