= A Call to Action: Women, Religion, Violence, and Power =

2014 book by Jimmy Carter

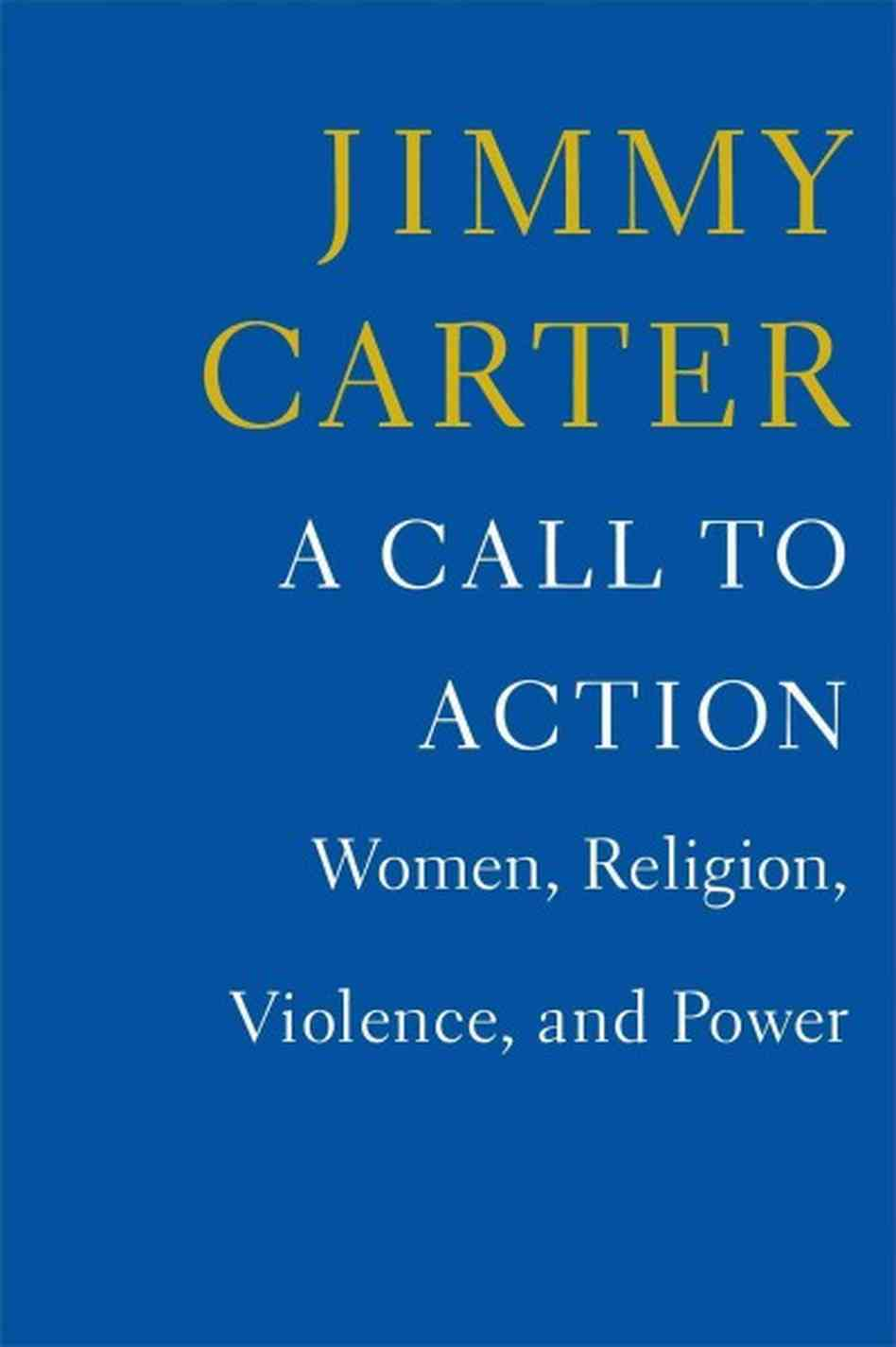
- Author: Jimmy Carter
- Language: English
- Genre: Essay
- Publisher: Simon & Schuster
- Publication date: 2014
- Publication place: United States
- Media type: Print (hardback)
- Pages: 214

A Call to Action: Women, Religion, Violence, and Power is a book by former US president Jimmy Carter, published in 2014.

== Content ==
Carter calls discrimination and abuse of women and girls "the most serious and unaddressed worldwide challenge" of our time, and the book covers a wide range of problems including infanticide and selective abortion of female fetuses; female genital mutilation; rape, especially as a weapon of war; human trafficking of women and girls for sex; child marriage; honor killings; domestic violence; and social discrimination, including within the United States, which he sees as lagging behind the rest of the developed world in many of these issues. Carter writes that women are more affected than men in practically all forms of human rights abuse. He also notes some churches incorrectly interpreting religious texts to preach the inferiority of women and prevent them from filling leadership roles, an issue over which he parted ways with his own church in 2000, the Southern Baptist Convention, while remaining active in his local congregation which unlike the wider SBC employs woman in leadership roles such as pastor. In the book, Carter calls on religious leaders, world leaders, and activists to support women's rights and fight for change. He also provides 23 recommendations "that can help blaze the road to progress".

== Reception ==
The Pittsburgh Post-Gazette reviewed the book as "a tour de force of the global abuse and manipulation of women" and commended Carter's presentation of statistical data. Marianne Schnall writes that Carter "represents an important and growing trend of men advocating against violence against women and supporting women's equality." The Adventist magazine Spectrum called the book "a must read". According to Christians for Biblical Equality, "Carter draws upon his own experiences and the testimony of courageous women from all regions and all major religions to demonstrate that women around the world, more than half of all human beings, are being denied equal rights. This is an informed and passionate charge about a devastating effect on economic prosperity and unconscionable human suffering. It affects us all."
