= Grammy Award milestones =

Throughout the history of the Grammy Awards, many significant records have been set. This page only includes the competitive awards which have been won by various artists. This does not include the various special awards that are presented by the National Academy of Recording Arts and Sciences such as Lifetime Achievement Awards, Trustees Awards, Technical Awards or Legend Awards. The page however does include other non-performance related Grammys (known as the Craft & Production Fields) that may have been presented to the artist(s).

== Awards ==
=== Most Grammys won ===
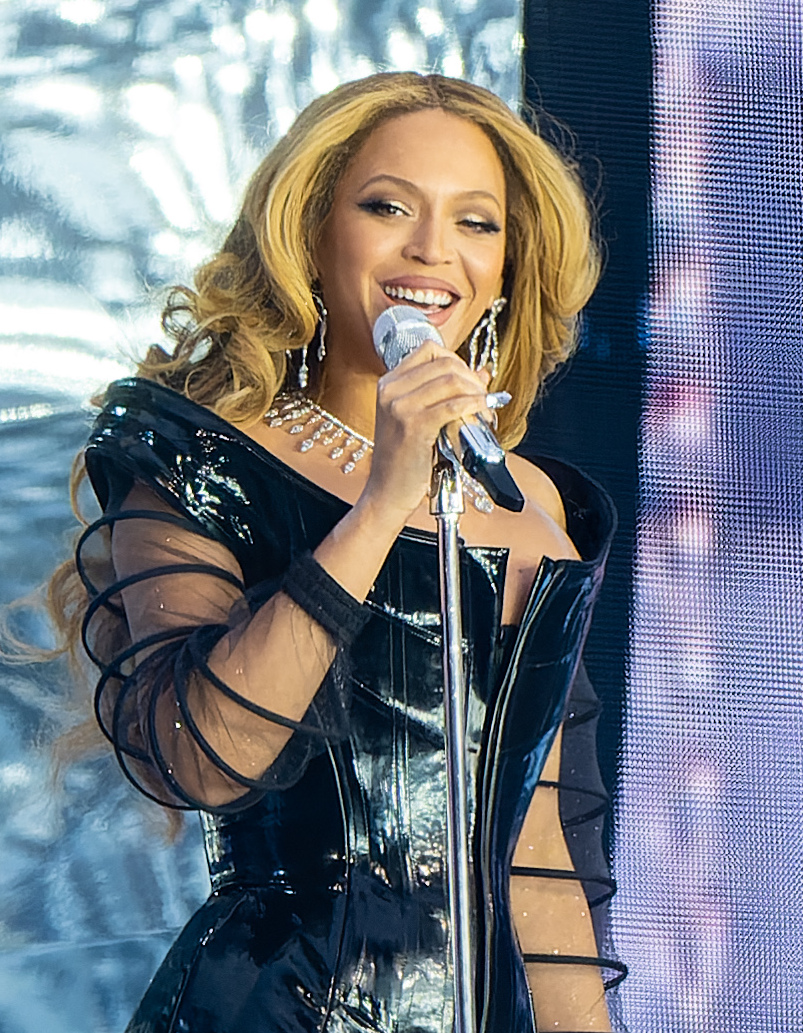
Beyoncé has won a total of 35 Grammy Awards

The record for the most Grammy Awards won in a lifetime is currently held by American singer, songwriter and record producer Beyoncé, who has won 35. Hungarian-British conductor Sir Georg Solti, the previous record holder and current second-most wins, has 31.

Rank	Artist	Awards
1	Beyoncé (Note: Includes 3 awards as part of Destiny's Child, and 1 award as part of The Carters)	35
2	Sir Georg Solti	31
3	Chick Corea	29
4	Quincy Jones	28
5	Alison Krauss (Note: Includes 14 awards with Union Station)	27
5	Kendrick Lamar	27
5	John Williams	27
8	Pierre Boulez	26
9	Vladimir Horowitz	25
9	Stevie Wonder	25
9	David Frost	25
9	Jay-Z	25
13	Ye	24
13	Şerban Ghenea	24
15	Vince Gill	22
15	U2	22
17	Pat Metheny	20
17	Al Schmitt	20
17	Bruce Springsteen	20
17	Henry Mancini	20
17	Kirk Franklin	20
17	Yo-Yo Ma	20

=== Most Grammys won by a female artist ===
Beyoncé has won 35 Grammy Awards.

Rank	Artist	Awards
1	Beyoncé	35
2	Alison Krauss	27
3	Aretha Franklin	18
3	CeCe Winans	18
5	Alicia Keys	17
6	Adele	16
6	Lady Gaga	16
8	Taylor Swift	14
9	Leontyne Price	13
9	Ella Fitzgerald	13
9	Emmylou Harris	13
9	Bonnie Raitt	13
13	Shirley Caesar	12
14	Linda Ronstadt	11
14	Brandi Carlile	11
14	Joni Mitchell	11
17	Norah Jones	10
17	Chaka Khan	10
17	Dolly Parton	10
17	Billie Eilish	10

=== Most Grammys won by a male artist ===
Sir Georg Solti has won 31 Grammy Awards.

Rank	Artist	Awards
1	Sir Georg Solti	31
2	Chick Corea	29
3	Quincy Jones	28
4	John Williams	27
4	Kendrick Lamar	27
6	Pierre Boulez	26
7	Vladimir Horowitz	25
7	Stevie Wonder	25
7	Jay-Z	25
10	Kanye West	24
11	Vince Gill	22
12	Pat Metheny	20
12	Bruce Springsteen	20
12	Henry Mancini	20
12	Kirk Franklin	20
12	Yo-Yo Ma	20

=== Most Grammys won by a group ===
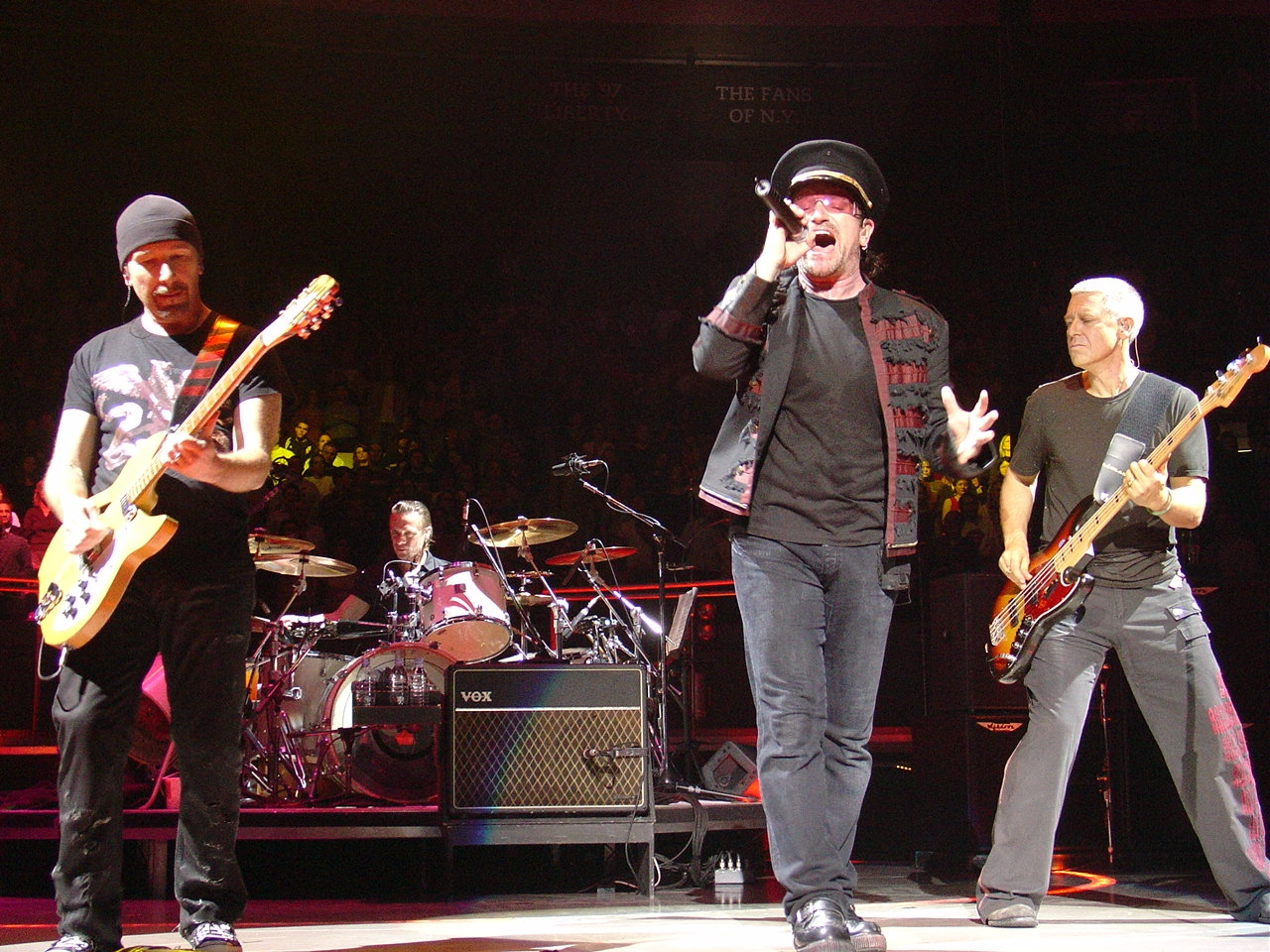
22-time Grammy Winners, U2 in 2005

U2 holds the record for most Grammy Awards won by a group. They have won 22 awards.

Rank	Artists	Awards
1	U2	22
2	Foo Fighters	15
3	Alison Krauss & Union Station	14
4	The Chicks	13
5	Pat Metheny Group	10
6	Emerson String Quartet	9
6	Metallica	9
8	The Manhattan Transfer	8
8	Santana	8
8	The Blackwood Brothers	8
8	Take 6	8
8	The Beatles	8
8	Asleep At The Wheel	8
14	Simon & Garfunkel	7
14	Ricky Skaggs and Kentucky Thunder	7
14	Los Tigres del Norte	7
14	Lady A	7
14	Coldplay	7

=== Most Grammys won by a producer ===
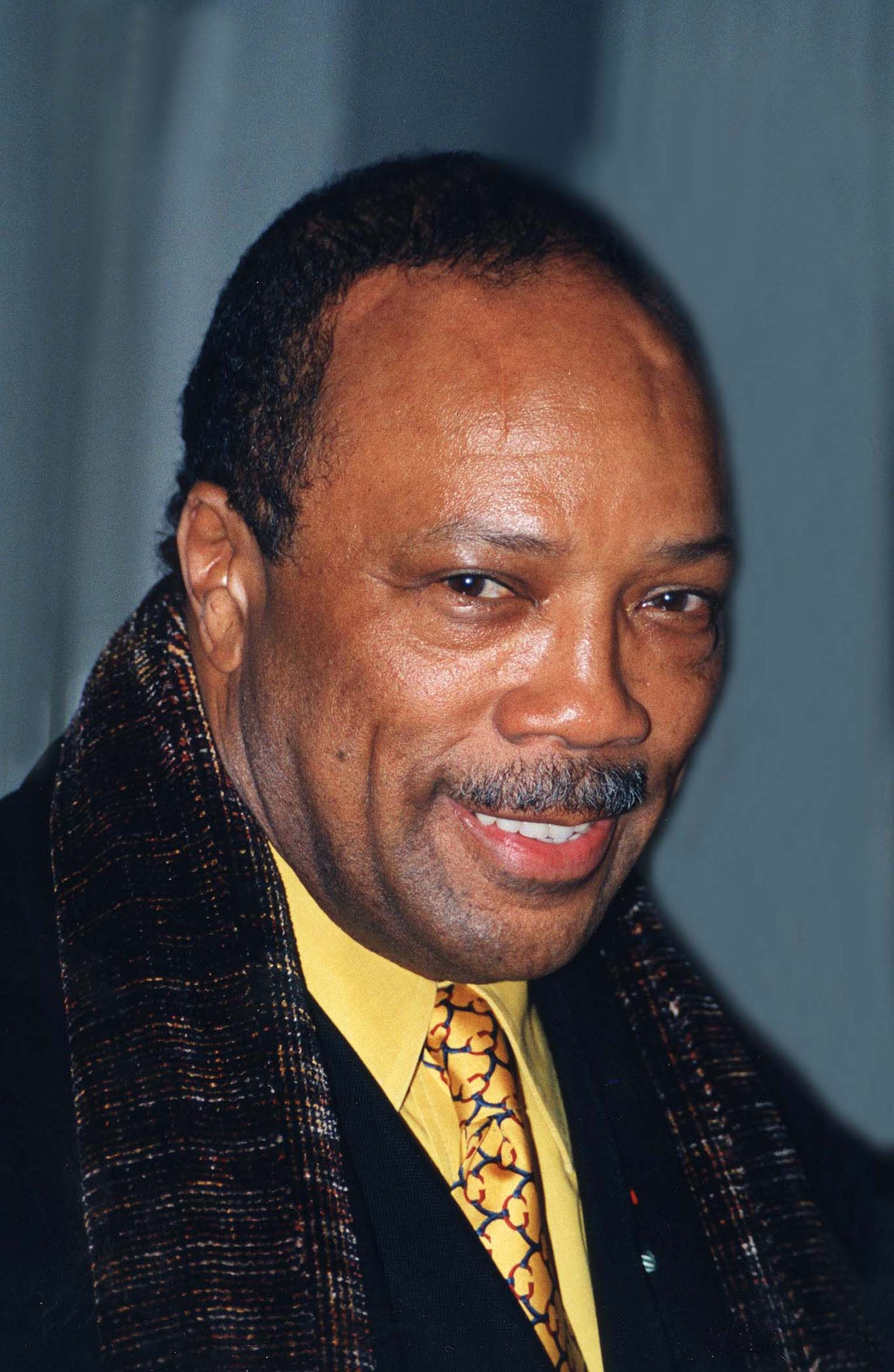
28-time Grammy Winner, Quincy Jones in 1997

Quincy Jones holds the record for most Grammy Awards won by a producer, with 28 awards. Eleven of these were awarded for production duties; Jones has also received Grammys as an arranger and a performing artist. Some producers have also won awards as engineers, mixers, and/or mastering engineers.

Rank	Producer	Awards
1	Quincy Jones	28
2	David Frost	25
3	Kanye West	24
4	Steven Epstein	17
5	David Foster	16
5	James Mallinson	16
7	Judith Sherman	15
8	Jack Antonoff	14
8	Phil Ramone	14
8	Kabir Sehgal	14
8	Pharrell Williams	14
12	T Bone Burnett	13
12	Jay David Saks	13
12	Robert Woods	13

=== Most Grammys won by a rapper ===
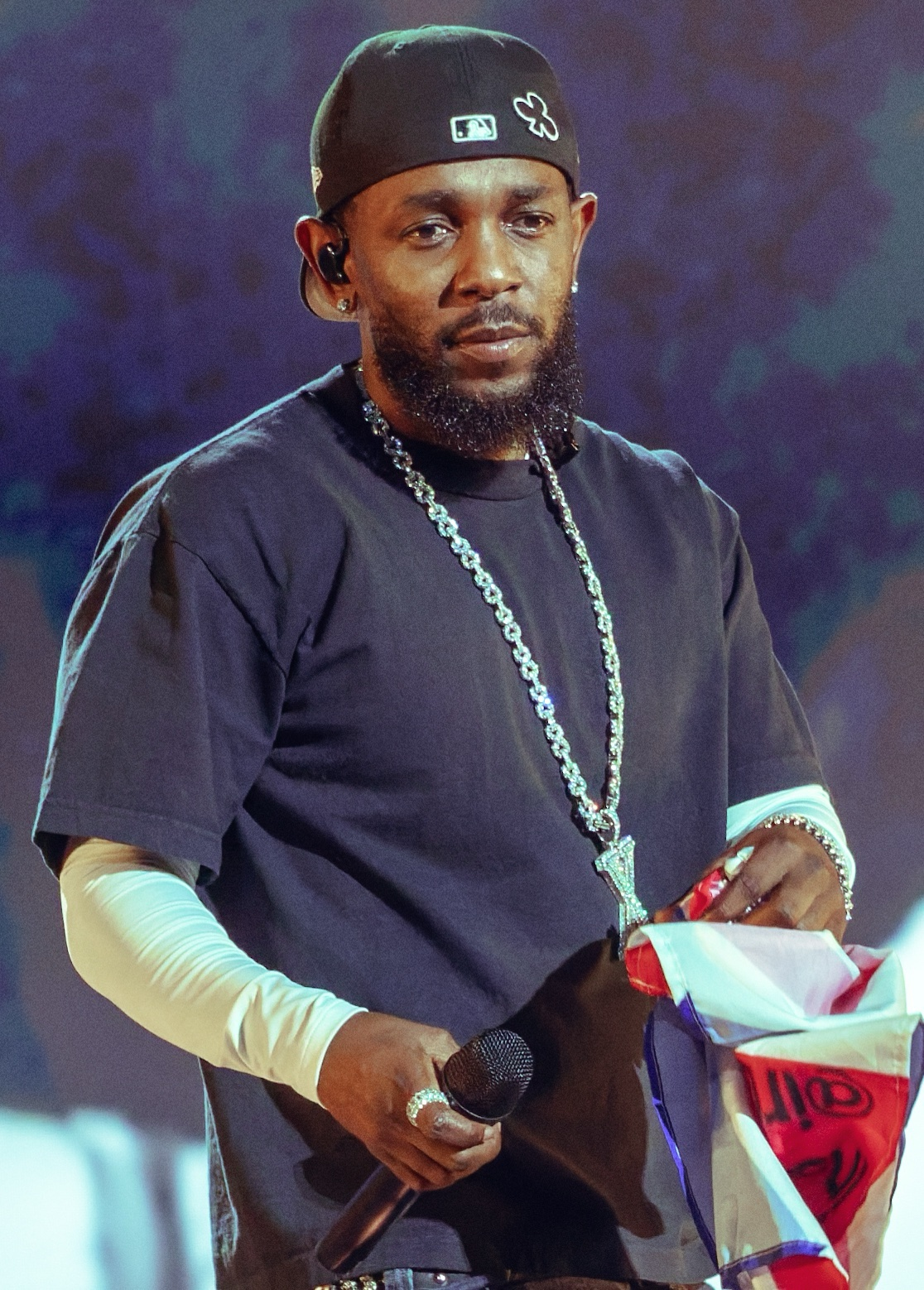
27-time Grammy winner Kendrick Lamar in 2025

Kendrick Lamar is the most-awarded rapper, with 27. Lauryn Hill is the most awarded female rapper, with eight Grammy Awards.

Rank	Rapper	Awards
1	Kendrick Lamar	27
2	Jay-Z	25
3	Kanye West	24
4	Eminem	15
5	Pharrell Williams	14
6	André 3000 (Note: Includes 6 awards as part of Outkast)	10
7	Anderson .Paak	9
8	Lauryn Hill (Note: Includes 2 awards as part of Fugees)	8
9	Dr. Dre	7
10	Outkast	6

=== Most Grammys won by a jazz artist ===
Chick Corea, with 29 awards, has won more Grammy Awards than any other jazz artist. Pat Metheny is second with 20 Grammy Awards.

Rank	Artist	Awards
1	Chick Corea	29
2	Pat Metheny	20

=== Most Grammys won by an engineer or mixer ===
Şerban Ghenea with 24 awards, has won more Grammy Awards than any other engineer or mixer.

Rank	Engineer / Mixer	Awards
1	Serban Ghenea	24
2	Al Schmitt	20
3	Tom Elmhirst	17

=== Most Grammys won in the country genre ===
With 21 country-specific Grammy Awards, Vince Gill has won more Grammy Awards in the genre than any other artist. Alison Krauss has the most country-specific Grammy Awards for female artists, with fourteen.

Rank	Artist	Awards	Country Song wins	Country Solo Performance wins	Country Duo/Group Performance wins	Best Country Instrumental Performance	Best New Country & Western Artist	Country Albums wins
1	Vince Gill	21	2	10	2	5	0	2
2	Chet Atkins	14	0	0	1	13	0	0
2	Alison Krauss	14	0	1	8	3	0	2
4	Chris Stapleton	12	3	6	0	0	0	3
5	Roger Miller	11	3	5	0	0	1	2
6	The Chicks	10	0	0	5	1	0	4
7	Emmylou Harris	9	0	4	5	0	0	0
8	Ricky Skaggs	8	0	0	3	3	0	2
9	Johnny Cash	7	0	4	2	0	0	1
9	Randy Travis	7	0	2	2	0	0	3
9	Dolly Parton	7	1	3	3	0	0	0
9	Kacey Musgraves	7	3	1	1	0	0	2
13	Ronnie Milsap	6	0	5	1	0	0	0
13	Carrie Underwood	6	0	5	1	0	0	0
15	Mary Chapin Carpenter	5	0	4	0	0	0	1
15	Shania Twain	5	2	2	0	0	0	1
15	Faith Hill	5	0	4	0	0	0	1
15	Taylor Swift	5	2	2	0	0	0	1
15	Glen Campbell	5	1	4	0	0	0	0
20	Keith Urban	4	0	4	0	0	0	0
20	Willie Nelson	4	1	2	0	0	0	1

=== Youngest winners ===
The Peasall Sisters are the youngest Grammy winners, when they were credited artists on the O Brother, Where Art Thou? soundtrack, which won Album of the Year in 2002. Aura V is the youngest individual winner. She was 8 years old when she won her first award in 2026. At age 18, Billie Eilish became the youngest artist to win every Big 4 award.

Rank	Age	Artist	Year
1	8 years	Aura V	2026
2	8 years, 7 days	Leah Peasall	2002
3	9 years, 66 days	Blue Ivy Carter	2021
4	11 years	Hannah Peasall	2002
5	14 years	Sarah Peasall	2002
6	14 years, 160 days	Walter Russell III	2023
7	14 years, 182 days	LeAnn Rimes	1997
8	14 years, 313 days	Luis Miguel	1985
9	16 years, 308 days	Stephen Marley	1989
10	17 years, 80 days	Lorde	2014
11	18 years, 39 days	Billie Eilish	2020
12	18 years, 112 days	Daya	2017
13	18 years, 311 days	Joey Calveiro	2026

=== Youngest artists to win Album of the Year (as lead artist) ===
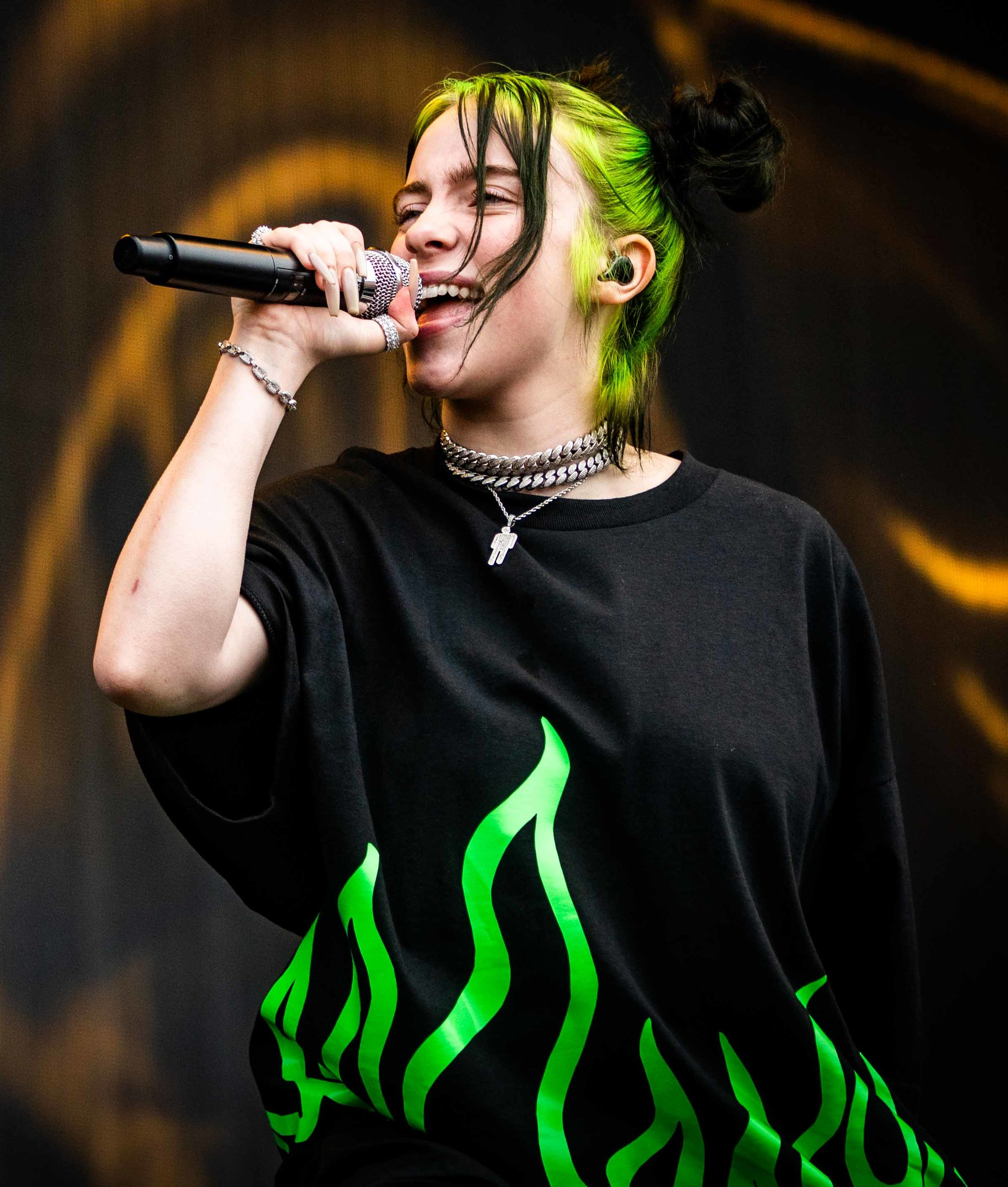
Billie Eilish is the youngest artist to win the Grammys for Album of the Year and Record of the Year.

Billie Eilish is the youngest artist to win Album of the Year as a lead. She was 18 years old while winning for her album When We All Fall Asleep, Where Do We Go? in 2020.

Rank	Age	Artist	Year
1	18 years, 39 days	Billie Eilish	2020
2	20 years, 49 days	Taylor Swift	2010
3	21 years, 272 days	Alanis Morissette	1996
4	22 years, 18 days	Barbra Streisand	1964
5	23 years, 274 days	Lauryn Hill	1999
6	23 years, 283 days	Adele	2012
7	23 years, 293 days	Stevie Wonder	1974
8	23 years, 330 days	Norah Jones	2003

=== Youngest artists to win Record of the Year ===
At 18 years of age, Billie Eilish became the youngest artist to win Record of the Year when she won for "Bad Guy" in 2020. She also became the second youngest artist to win in the following year, winning the award for "Everything I Wanted."

Rank	Age	Artist	Year
1	18 years, 39 days	Billie Eilish	2020
2	19 years, 86 days	Billie Eilish	2021
3	22 years, 265 days	Sam Smith	2015
4	22 years, 320 days	Kimbra	2013
5	23 years, 72 days	Jared Followill (Kings of Leon)	2010
6	23 years, 199 days	Bobby Darin	1960
7	23 years, 283 days	Adele	2012
8	23 years, 330 days	Norah Jones	2003
9	24 years, 23 days	Florence LaRue (The 5th Dimension)	1968
10	24 years, 149 days	Amy Winehouse	2008

=== Youngest artist to win Song of the Year ===
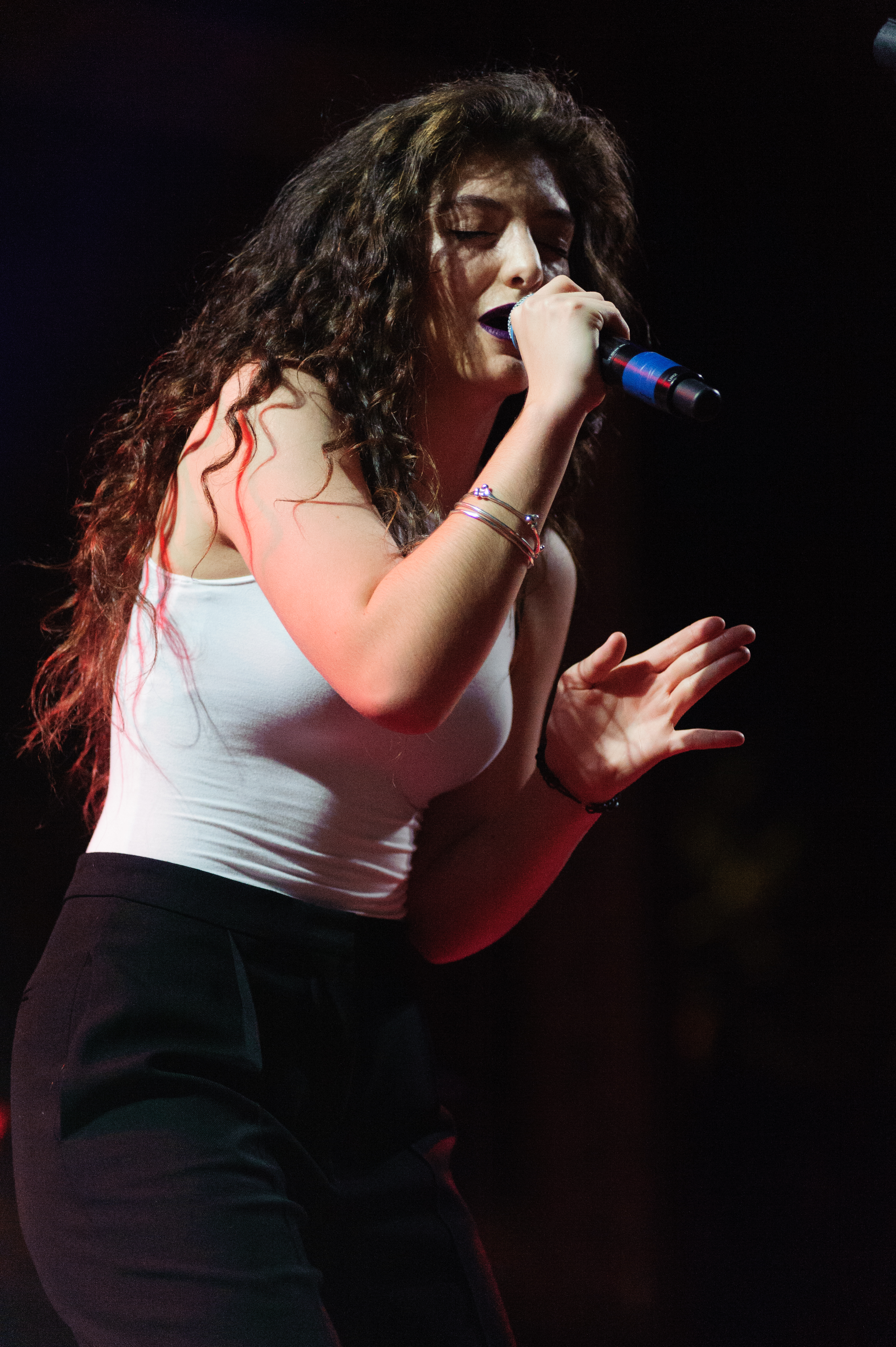
Lorde became the youngest Song of the Year winner in 2014.

At 17 years of age, Lorde became the youngest artist to win Song of the Year when she won for "Royals" in 2014.

=== Youngest artist to win Best New Artist ===
At 14 years of age, LeAnn Rimes became the youngest Best New Artist winner when she won in 1997.

=== Youngest artist to win Best Latin Jazz Album ===
At 18 years of age, Joey Calveiro became the youngest Best Latin Jazz Album winner when he won in 2026.

=== Oldest winners ===
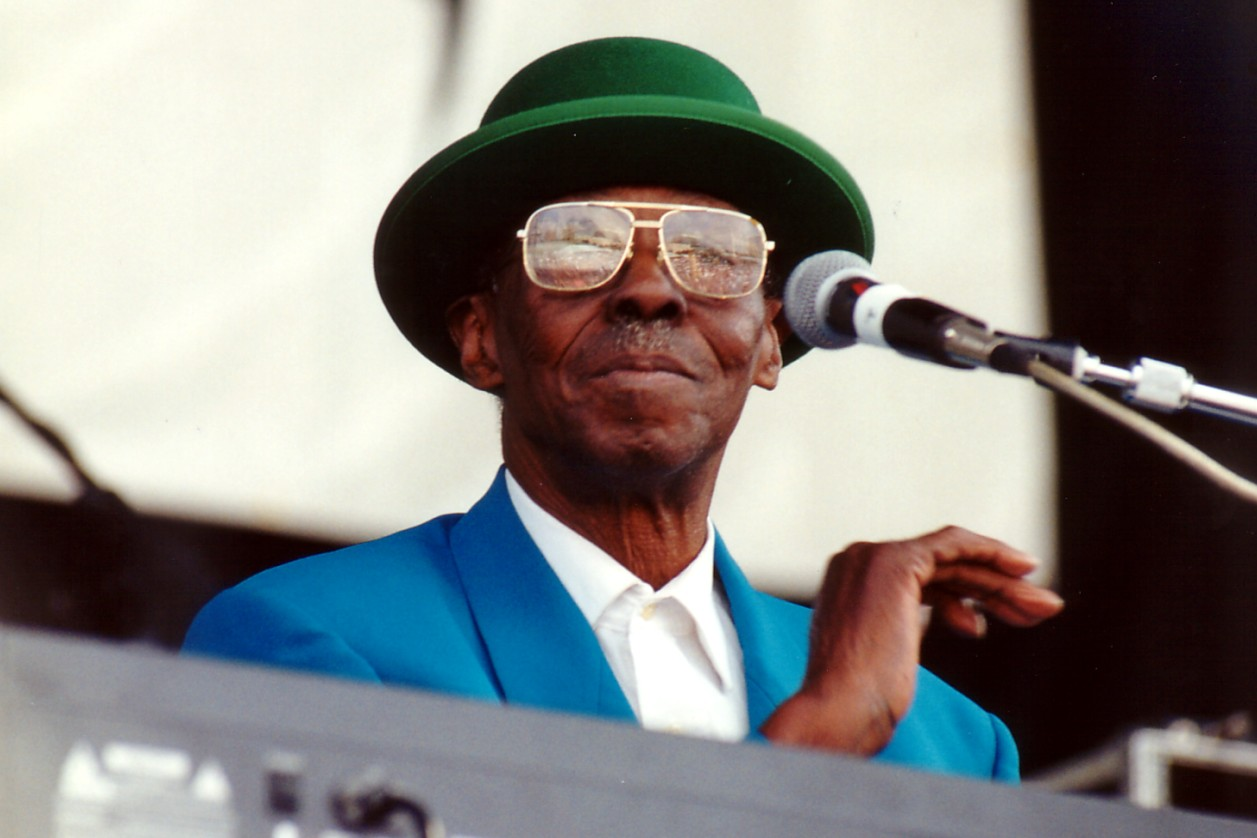
Pinetop Perkins is the oldest Grammy winner to win while alive, winning just weeks prior to his death

Jimmy Carter is the oldest person to win a Grammy. In 2025, he was posthumously awarded with Best Audio Book, Narration, and Storytelling Recording posthumously for Last Sundays In Plains: A Centennial Celebration, at 100 years of age. Pinetop Perkins is the oldest person to win a Grammy while still alive. In 2011 he was awarded with Best Traditional Blues Album for Joined at the Hip, at 97 years of age.

Rank	Age	Artist	Year Won, Category, Work
1	100 years, 89 days	Jimmy Carter	2025, Best Audio Book, Narration, and Storytelling Recording, Last Sundays In Plains: A Centennial Celebration
2	97 years, 221 days	Pinetop Perkins	2011, Best Traditional Blues Album, Joined at the Hip
3	95 years, 243 days	Tony Bennett	2022, Best Traditional Pop Vocal Album, Love For Sale
4	95 years, 31 days	George Burns	1991, Best Spoken Word or Non-Musical Recording Album (now called Best Spoken Word Album), Gracie: A Love Story
5	94 years, 132 days	Jimmy Carter	2019, Best Spoken Word Album, Faith: A Journey For All
6	93 years, 358 days	John Williams	2026, Best Music Film, Music by John Williams
7	91 years, 361 days	John Williams	2024, Best Instrumental Composition, Helena's Theme
8	91 years, 137 days	Jimmy Carter	2016, Best Spoken Word Album, A Full Life: Reflections at 90
9	90 years, 210 days	Dalai Lama	2026, Best Audio Book, Narration, and Storytelling; Recording Meditations: The Reflections Of His Holiness The Dalai Lama
10	90 years, 52 days	Elizabeth Cotten	1985, Best Ethnic or Traditional Folk Recording, Elizabeth Cotten Live!

Note: Sources vary on the birth year of Elizabeth Cotten, with some stating it as 1893, while others say 1895. The above information credits it as 1895. With either year, Cotten is the oldest female Grammy winner.

=== Most honored albums ===
Santana's Supernatural holds the record for most honored album, having won nine awards in 2000.

Number	Albums and artists	Awards
1	Supernatural — Santana	9
2	Thriller — Michael Jackson	8
2	How to Dismantle an Atomic Bomb — U2	8
2	Genius Loves Company — Ray Charles	8
5	Back on the Block — Quincy Jones	7
5	All That You Can't Leave Behind — U2	7
5	Come Away With Me — Norah Jones	7
5	21 — Adele	7
5	24K Magic — Bruno Mars	7
10	The Return of Roger Miller — Roger Miller	6
10	Bridge over Troubled Water — Simon & Garfunkel	6
10	Toto IV — Toto	6
10	Unforgettable... with Love — Natalie Cole	6
10	Raising Sand — Robert Plant & Alison Krauss	6
10	The Blueprint 3 — Jay-Z	6
10	To Pimp a Butterfly — Kendrick Lamar	6

=== Most Album of the Year wins ===
The record for most Album of the Year wins is five.

One engineer/mixer; has won the award five times;

- Şerban Ghenea, engineer/mixer — 1989 (2016), 25 (2017), 24K Magic (2018), Folklore (2021), Midnights (2024)

One artist, one engineer/mixer and two mastering engineers have won the award four times;

- Taylor Swift, artist — Fearless (2010), 1989 (2016), Folklore (2021), Midnights (2024)
- John Hanes, engineer/mixer — 1989 (2016), 25 (2017), 24K Magic (2018), Folklore (2021)
- Tom Coyne, mastering engineer — 21 (2012), 1989 (2016), 25 (2017), 24K Magic (2018)
- Randy Merrill, mastering engineer — 25 (2017), Folklore (2021), Harry's House (2023), Midnights (2024)

Three recording artists, five record producers, three engineer/mixers and one mastering engineer have won the award three times;

- Frank Sinatra, artist — Come Dance with Me! (1960), September of My Years (1966), A Man and His Music (1967)
- Stevie Wonder, artist — Innervisions (1974), Fulfillingness' First Finale (1975), Songs in the Key of Life (1977)
- Paul Simon, artist — Bridge over Troubled Water (1971), Still Crazy After All These Years (1976), Graceland (1987)
- David Foster, producer — Unforgettable... with Love (1992), The Bodyguard – Original Soundtrack Album (1994), Falling into You (1997)
- Phil Ramone, producer — Still Crazy After All These Years (1976), 52nd Street (1980), Genius Loves Company (2005)
- Daniel Lanois, producer — The Joshua Tree (1988), Time Out of Mind (1998), How to Dismantle an Atomic Bomb (2006)
- Ryan Tedder, producer — 21 (2012), 1989 (2016), 25 (2017)
- Mike Piersante, engineer/mixer — O Brother, Where Art Thou? – Soundtrack (2002), Raising Sand (2009), 25 (2017)
- Tom Elmhirst, engineer/mixer — 21 (2012), Morning Phase (2015), 25 (2017)
- Bob Ludwig, mastering engineer — Babel (2013), Random Access Memories (2014), Morning Phase (2015)
- Laura Sisk, engineer/mixer — 1989 (2016), Folklore (2021), Midnights (2024)
- Jack Antonoff, producer — 1989 (2016), Folklore (2021), Midnights (2024)

=== Most Record of the Year wins ===
The record for most Record of the Year wins is four. One mastering engineer has won the award four consecutive times;

- Tom Coyne, mastering engineer — “Stay with Me (Darkchild Version)” (2015), “Uptown Funk” (2016), “Hello” (2017), “24K Magic” (2018)

Two recording artists and four engineers/mixers have won the award three times;

- Paul Simon, artist — “Mrs. Robinson” (1969), “Bridge over Troubled Water” (1971), “Graceland” (1988)
- Bruno Mars, artist — “Uptown Funk” (2016), “24K Magic” (2018), “Leave the Door Open” (2022)
- Tom Elmhirst, engineer/mixer — “Rehab” (2008), “Rolling in the Deep” (2012), “Hello” (2017)
- Şerban Ghenea, engineer/mixer – “Uptown Funk” (2016), “24K Magic” (2018), “Leave the Door Open” (2022)
- John Hanes, engineer/mixer – “Uptown Funk” (2016), “24K Magic” (2018), “Leave the Door Open” (2022)
- Charles Moniz, engineer/mixer – “Uptown Funk” (2016), “24K Magic” (2018), “Leave the Door Open” (2022)

=== Most Song of the Year wins ===
The record for the most Song of the Year wins is three. Two songwriters have won in this category thrice;

- Billie Eilish – "Bad Guy" (2020), "What Was I Made For?" (2024), "Wildflower" (2026)
- Finneas O'Connell – "Bad Guy" (2020), "What Was I Made For?" (2024), "Wildflower" (2026)

Twelve songwriters previously shared the record of two wins;

- Henry Mancini - “Moon River” (1962), “Days of Wine and Roses” (1964)
- Johnny Mercer - “Moon River” (1962), “Days of Wine and Roses” (1964)
- James Horner - “Somewhere Out There” (1988), “My Heart Will Go On” (1999)
- Will Jennings - “Tears in Heaven” (1993), “My Heart Will Go On” (1999)
- Bono - “Beautiful Day” (2001), “Sometimes You Can't Make It on Your Own” (2006)
- Adam Clayton - “Beautiful Day” (2001), “Sometimes You Can't Make It on Your Own” (2006)
- The Edge - “Beautiful Day” (2001), “Sometimes You Can't Make It on Your Own” (2006)
- Larry Mullen Jr. - “Beautiful Day” (2001), “Sometimes You Can't Make It on Your Own” (2006)
- Adele - “Rolling in the Deep” (2012), “Hello” (2017)
- Brody Brown - “That's What I Like” (2018), “Leave the Door Open” (2022)
- D'Mile - “I Can't Breathe” (2021), “Leave the Door Open” (2022)
- Bruno Mars - “That's What I Like” (2018), “Leave the Door Open” (2022)

=== Most Grammys won for consecutive studio albums ===
Beyoncé won eight consecutive awards for eight consecutive studio albums.

=== Most consecutive Grammys won for the same category ===
Rank	Artist	Category	Years
1	Aretha Franklin	Best Female R&B Vocal Performance	8 (1968–1975)
2	Bill Cosby	Best Comedy Album	6 (1965–1970)
2	John Williams	Best Score Soundtrack for Visual Media	6 (1978–1983)
2	Jimmy Sturr	Best Polka Album	6 (1987–1992)
5	Vince Gill	Best Male Country Vocal Performance	5 (1995–1999)
6	Pat Benatar	Best Female Rock Vocal Performance	4 (1981–1984)
6	Robert Shaw	Best Choral Performance	4 (1988–1991)
6	Jack Renner	Best Engineered Album, Classical	4 (1988–1991)
6	Jimmy Sturr (three times)	Best Polka Album	4 (1996–1999) (2001–2004) (2006–2009)
6	Lenny Kravitz	Best Male Rock Vocal Performance	4 (1999–2002)
6	Tom Coyne	Record of the Year	4 (2015–2018)
6	Peter Schickele	Best Comedy Album	4 (1989–1992)

=== Artists who have won all four General Field awards ===
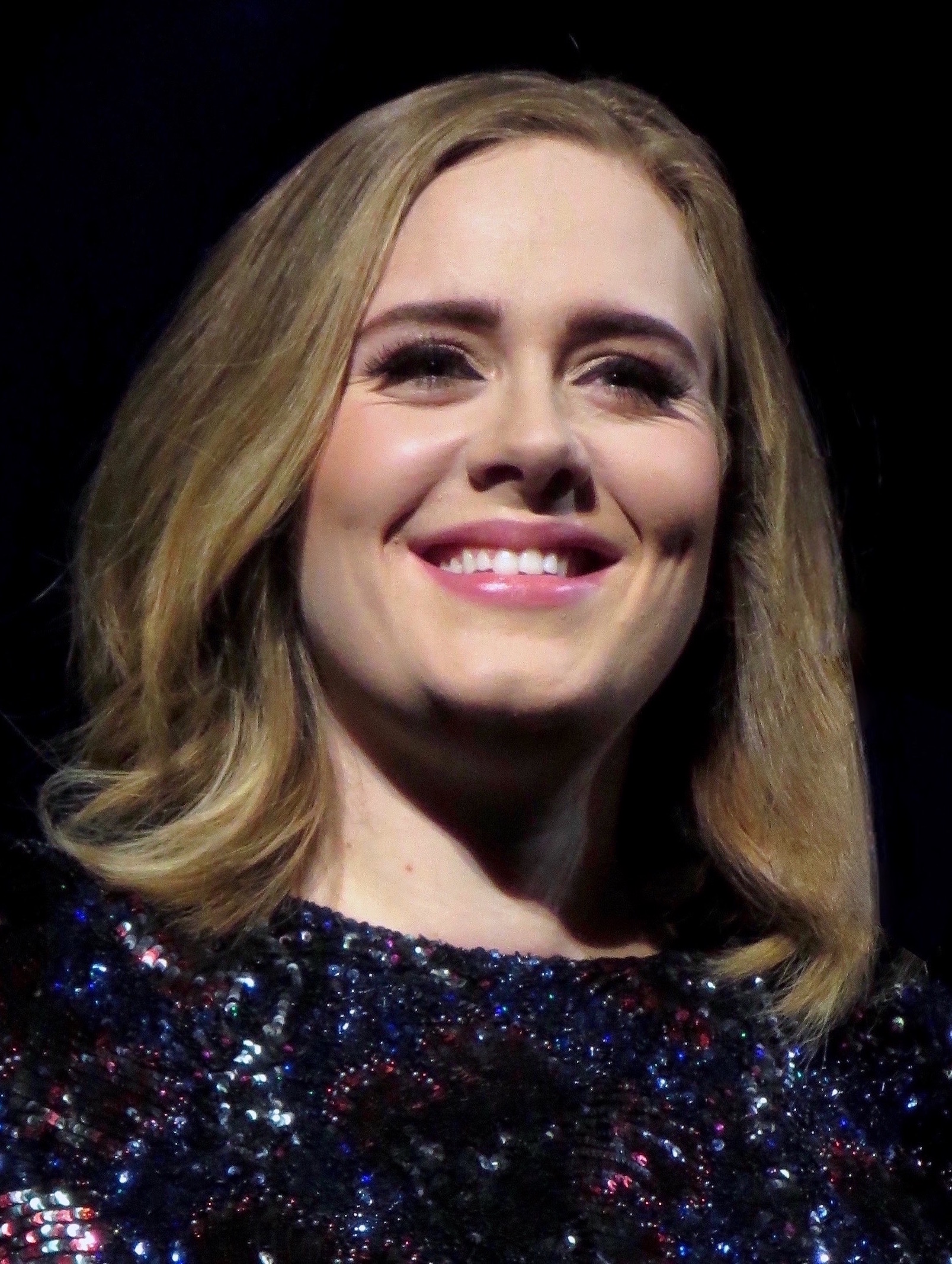
Adele is one of four artists who have won all four general field awards.

There have been only four musicians who have won all four General Field awards: Album of the Year, Record of the Year, Song of the Year, and Best New Artist.

In 1981, Christopher Cross became the first artist to win all four awards, as well as the first act to win them all in a single year.

In 2009, Adele won Best New Artist, and she earned the three other awards in both 2012 and 2017. She was the second artist to win all four accolades throughout her career.

In 2020, Billie Eilish became the third musician to win all four awards and the first female artist to win them during a single ceremony.

In 2026, Jack Antonoff has become the fourth musician to win all four awards, first winning Best New Artist and Song of the Year in 2013, winning Album of the Year thrice as a producer in 2016, 2021 and 2024; and winning Record of the Year as a Producer in 2026.

== Single ceremony ==
=== Most Grammys won in one night ===
The record for most Grammys won in one night is eight. Michael Jackson won eight in 1984 and is the only solo artist to do so. The group Santana tied with Michael Jackson’s record in 2000.

Rank	Artist(s)	Awards
1	Michael Jackson (1984)	8
1	Santana (2000)	8
3	Paul Simon (1971)	7 (Note: Note that, prior to a rule change in 1980, artists who were also credited producers received two Grammy Awards for production categories. Paul Simon won in only five categories though received seven total awards due to this.)
4	Roger Miller (1966)	6
4	Quincy Jones (1991)	6
4	Eric Clapton (1993)	6
4	Beyoncé (2010)	6
4	Adele (2012)	6
4	Tom Elmhirst (2017)	6
4	Bruno Mars (2018)	6
4	Finneas O'Connell (2020)	6

=== Most Grammys won by a male artist in one night ===
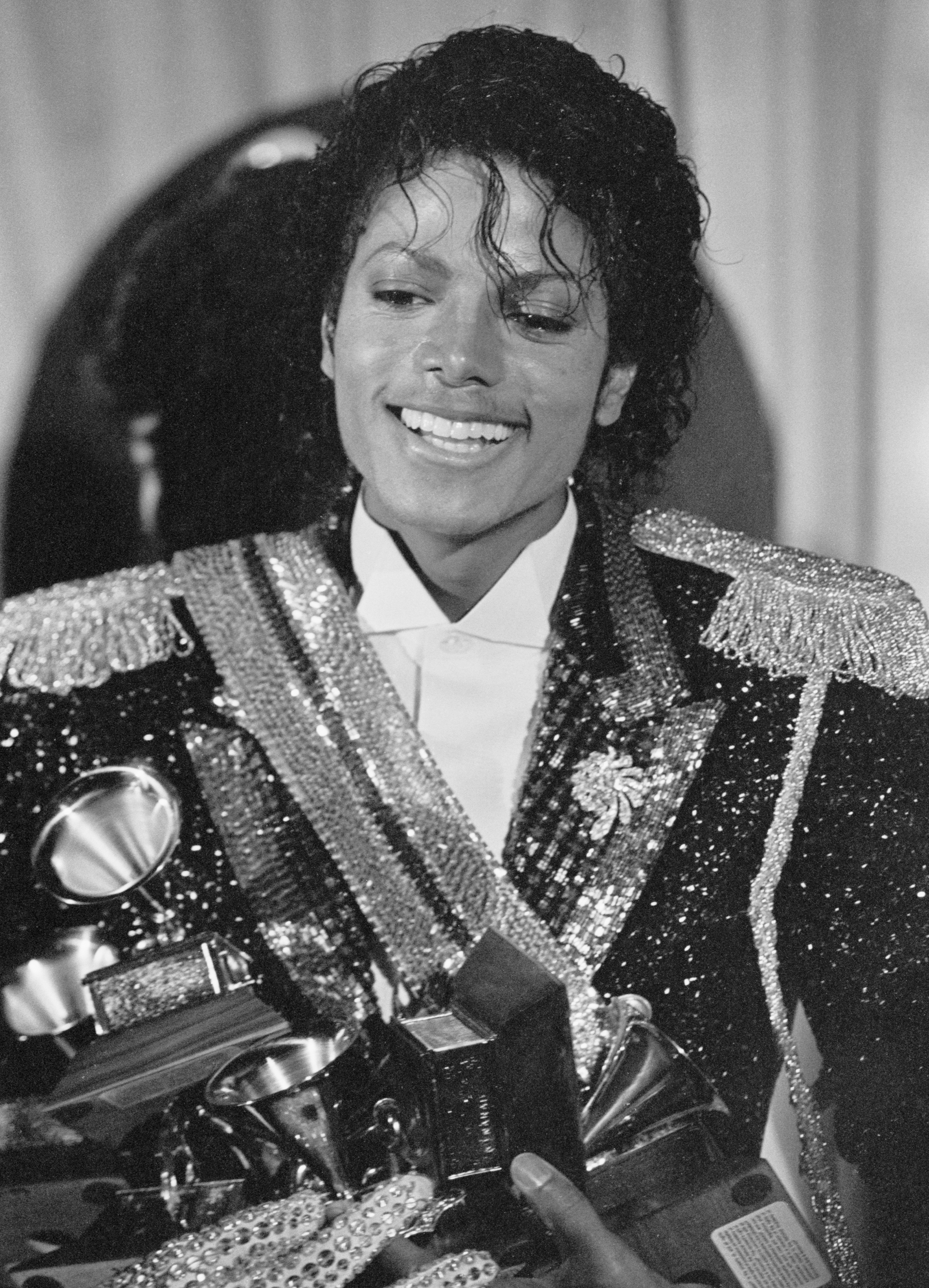
Michael Jackson won a record eight awards in 1984

The record for most Grammys won by a male artist in one night is eight. Michael Jackson won eight in 1984.

Rank	Artist(s)	Awards
1	Michael Jackson (1984)	8
2	Paul Simon (1971)	7
3	Roger Miller (1966)	6
3	Quincy Jones (1991)	6
3	Eric Clapton (1993)	6
3	Bruno Mars (2018)	6

=== Most Grammys won by a female artist in one night ===
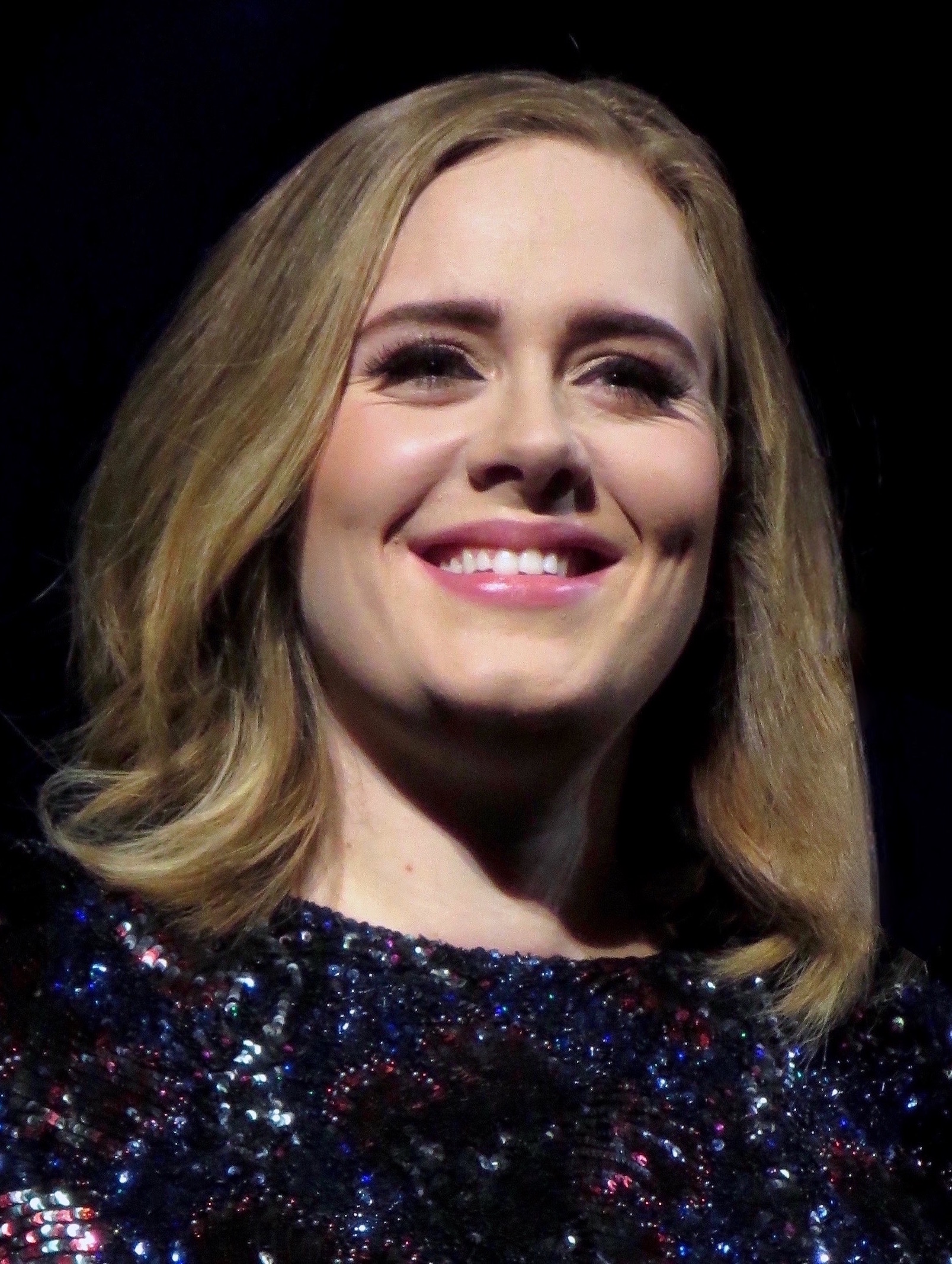
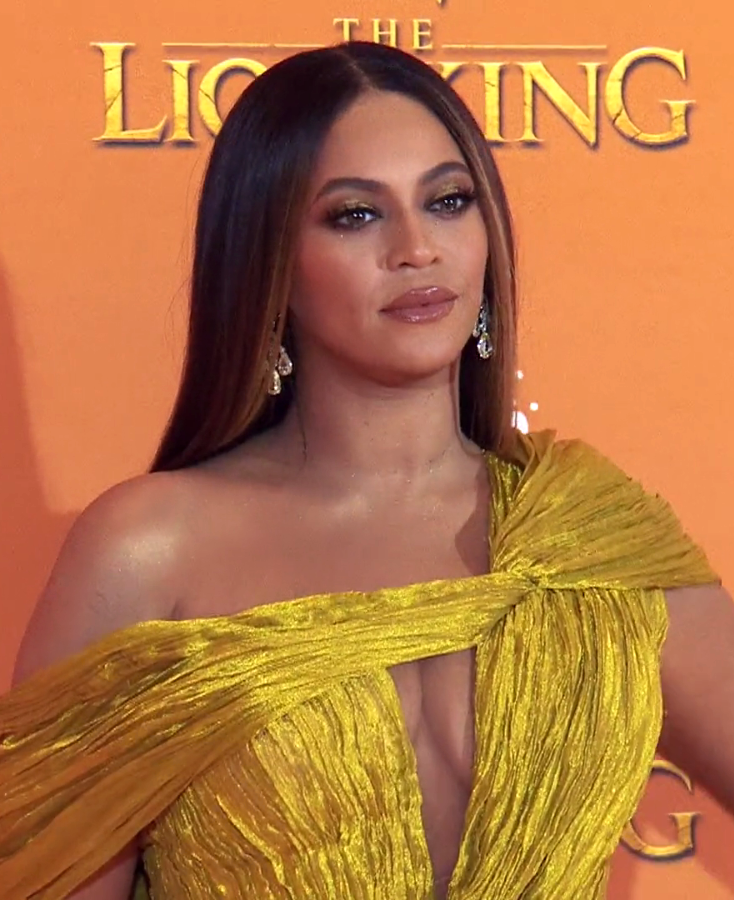
Adele and Beyoncé won six awards in a single year.

The record for most Grammys won by a female artist in one night is six. Beyoncé and Adele each won six in 2010 and 2012, respectively.

Rank	Artist	Awards
1	Beyoncé (2010)	6
1	Adele (2012)	6
3	Lauryn Hill (1999)	5
3	Alicia Keys (2002)	5
3	Norah Jones (2003)	5
3	Beyoncé (2004)	5
3	Amy Winehouse (2008)	5
3	Alison Krauss (2009)	5
3	Adele (2017)	5
3	Billie Eilish (2020)	5

=== Most Grammys won by a group in one night ===
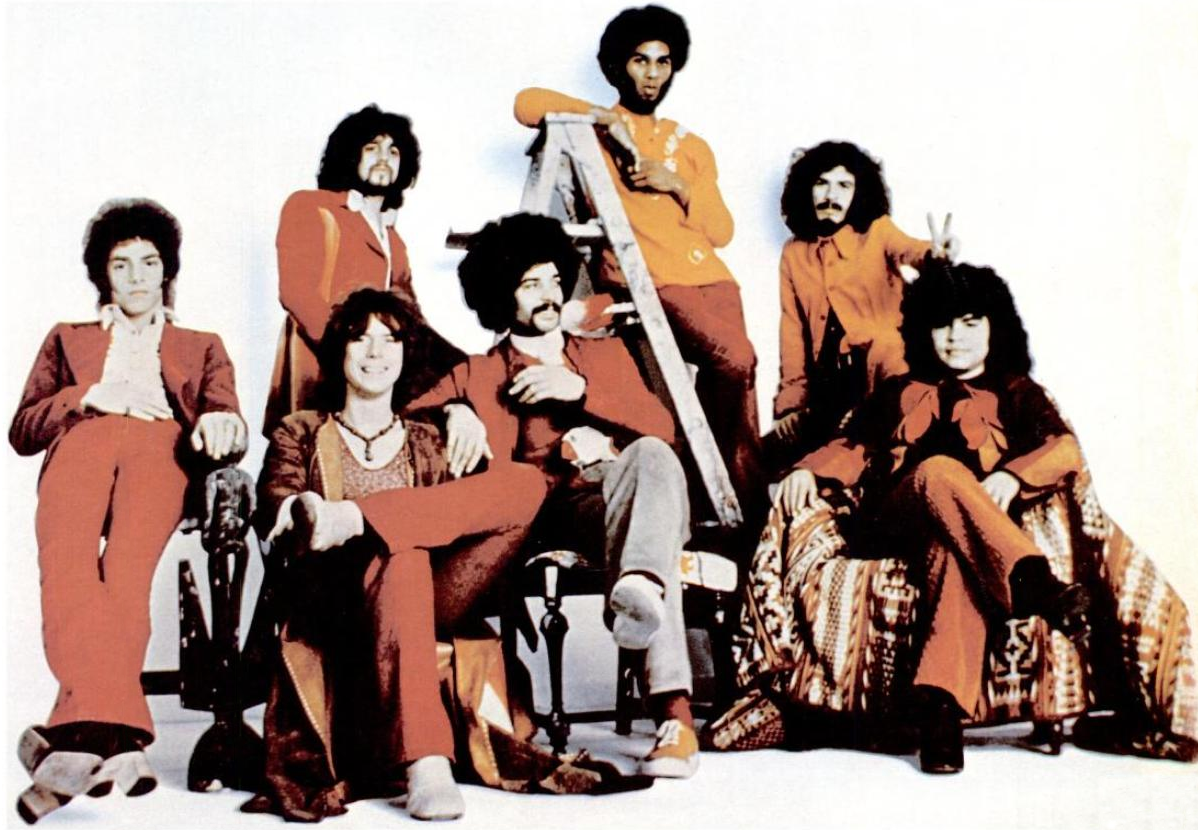
Santana won a record-tying eight awards in 2000

The record for most Grammys won by a group artist in a single night is eight. The band Santana won eight in 2000.

Rank	Artists	Awards
1	Santana (2000)	8
2	Simon & Garfunkel (1971)	5
2	U2 (2006)	5
2	The Chicks (2007)	5
2	Lady A (2011)	5
2	Foo Fighters (2012)	5

=== Most Grammys won by a record producer in one night ===
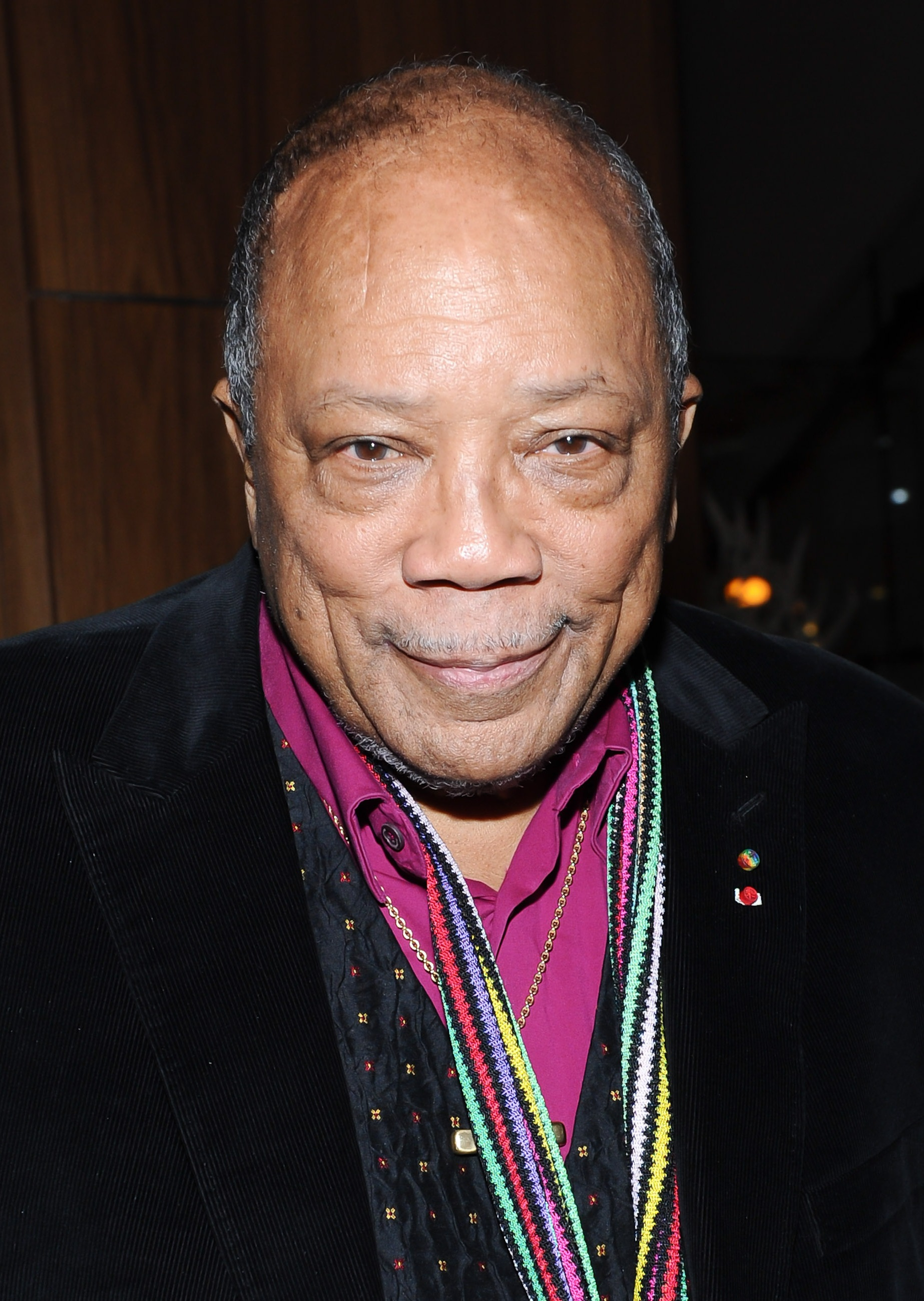
Quincy Jones won six Grammys in 1991, setting the record for most Grammys won by a producer in one night.

The record for most awards won by a producer in one night is six. The record was set by Quincy Jones who won six awards in 1991, including Album of the Year, Best Arrangement On An Instrumental, Best Instrumental Arrangement Accompanying Vocal(s), Best Jazz Fusion Performance, Best Rap Performance By A Duo Or Group, as well as Producer of the Year, Non-Classical for his own studio album Back on the Block.

Finneas O'Connell tied the record in 2020, winning Producer of the Year, Non-Classical and five additional awards, including Record of the Year, Album of the Year, Song of the Year, Best Engineered Album, Non-Classical, and Best Pop Vocal Album for his contribution on Billie Eilish's When We All Fall Asleep, Where Do We Go?.

=== Most Grammys won by an engineer or mixer in one night ===
The most Grammys won by an engineer or mixer in one night is six. At the 59th Annual Grammy Awards in 2017, Tom Elmhirst won Record of the Year, Album of the Year, Best Pop Vocal Album, Best Rock Album, Best Alternative Music Album, as well as Best Engineered Album, Non-Classical for his work on Adele's 25, Cage the Elephant's Tell Me I'm Pretty, and David Bowie's Blackstar respectively.

=== Artists who have won all four General Field Awards at a single ceremony ===
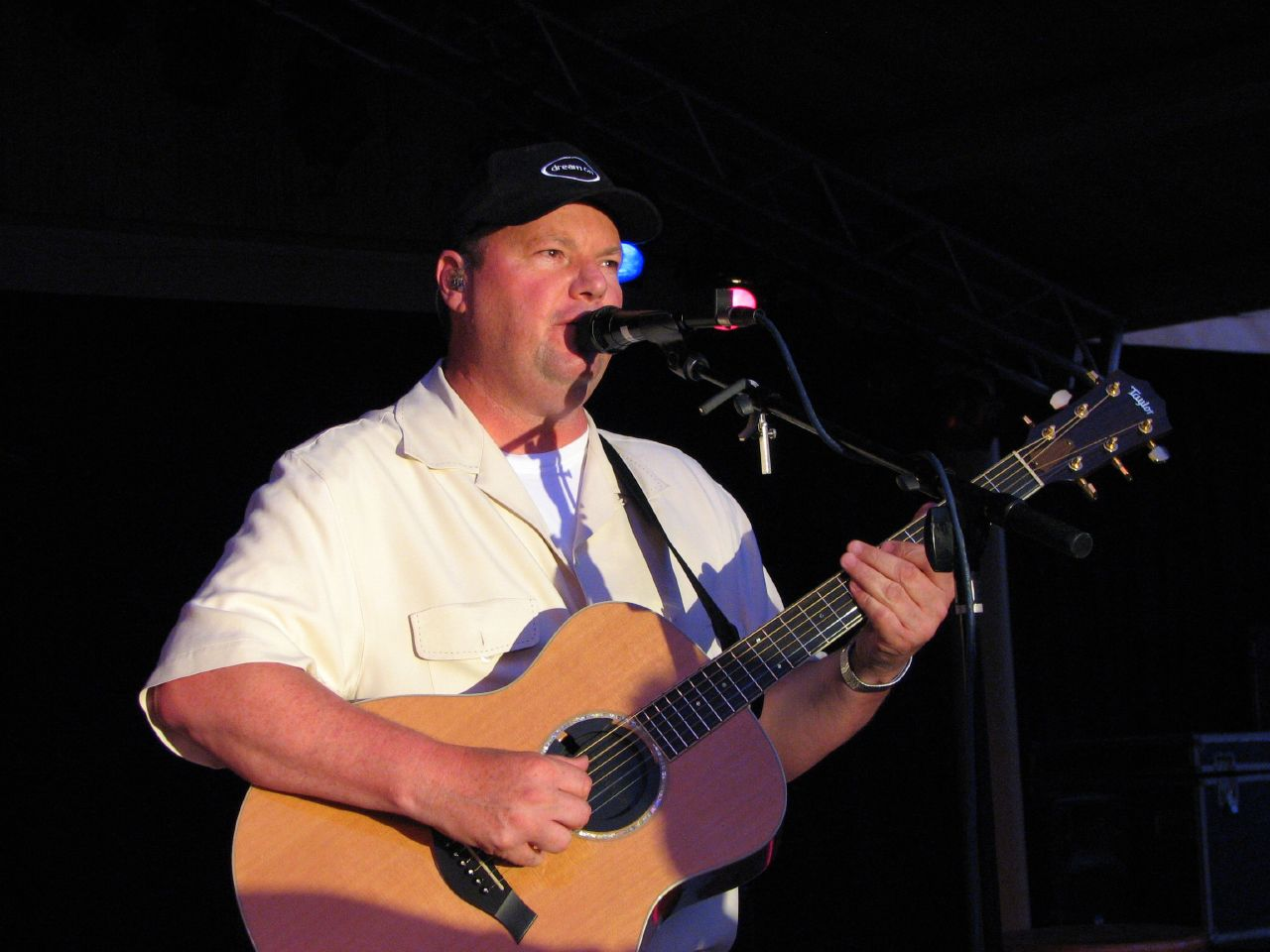
Christopher Cross was the first artist to win all four general field categories in one night

Christopher Cross (1981) and Billie Eilish (2020) are the only artists who have received all four General Field awards in one night.

=== Artists who have won Album, Record, and Song of the Year in one night ===
The three biggest Grammy Awards are Album of the Year, Record of the Year, and Song of the Year. Eight artists have won all three in one night. Adele is the first and only artist in Grammy history to accomplish this feat twice.

Year	Artist
1971	Paul Simon
1972	Carole King
1981	Christopher Cross
1993	Eric Clapton
2007	The Chicks
2012	Adele
2017	Adele
2018	Bruno Mars
2020	Billie Eilish

=== Most Grammys won by an album in one night ===
The most awards awarded to an album in one night is nine. At the 42nd Annual Grammy Awards in 2000 Santana's Supernatural was awarded nine awards. It won Record of the Year, Album of the Year, Song of the Year, Best Pop Collaboration with Vocals, Best Pop Instrumental Performance, Best Pop Performance by a Duo or Group with Vocals, Best Rock Instrumental Performance, Best Rock Performance by a Duo or Group with Vocal, and Best Rock Album.

=== Most posthumous Grammys won in one night ===
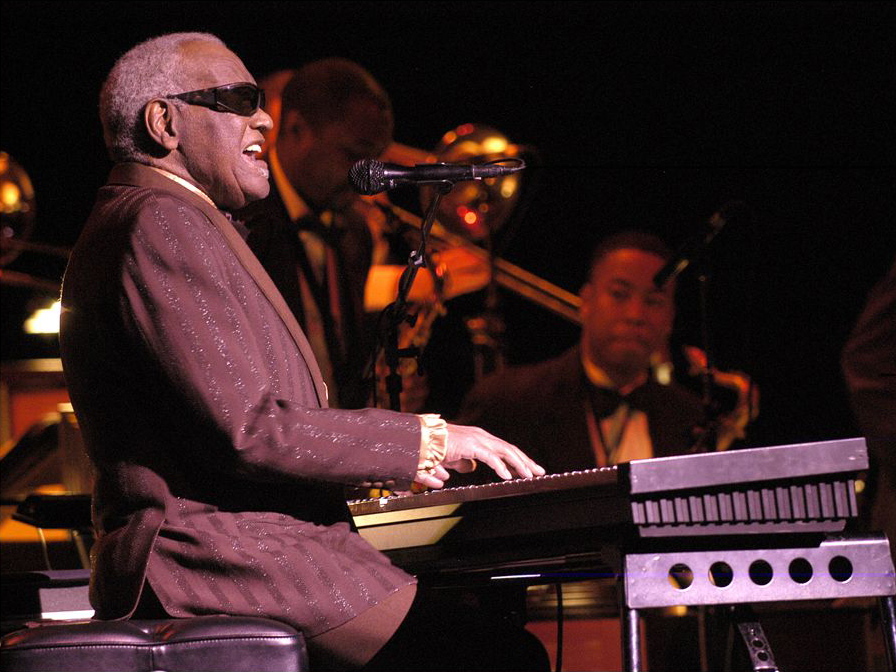
Ray Charles won five Grammys in 2005, less than a year after his death.

Ray Charles holds the record for most posthumous awards won in one night. He was awarded five Grammy Awards at the 47th Annual Grammy Awards in 2005, including both Record of the Year and Album of the Year.

== Nominations ==
=== Most Grammy nominations ===
Rank	Artist	Nominations
1	Beyoncé (Note: Beyoncé and Jay-Z were tied with 88 nominations until Beyoncé was nominated for 11 more Grammys in 2024, bringing her total up to 99.)	100
2	Jay-Z (Note: Includes 3 nominations as part of The Carters)	89
3	Paul McCartney (Note: Includes 26 nominations as part of The Beatles)	87
4	Chick Corea	81
5	Quincy Jones	80
6	John Williams	79
7	Kanye West	77
8	Stevie Wonder	75
9	Georg Solti	74
10	Henry Mancini	72
11	Pierre Boulez	67
11	Kendrick Lamar	67
13	Leonard Bernstein	63
13	Taylor Swift	63
15	Serban Ghenea	61
16	Willie Nelson	60
17	Dolly Parton	58
18	Drake	57
19	Babyface	54
20	Jay David Saks	53

=== Most nominations in one night ===
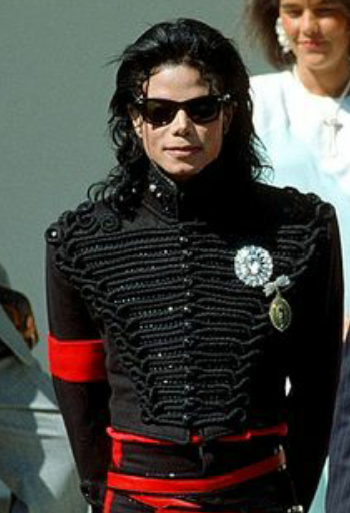
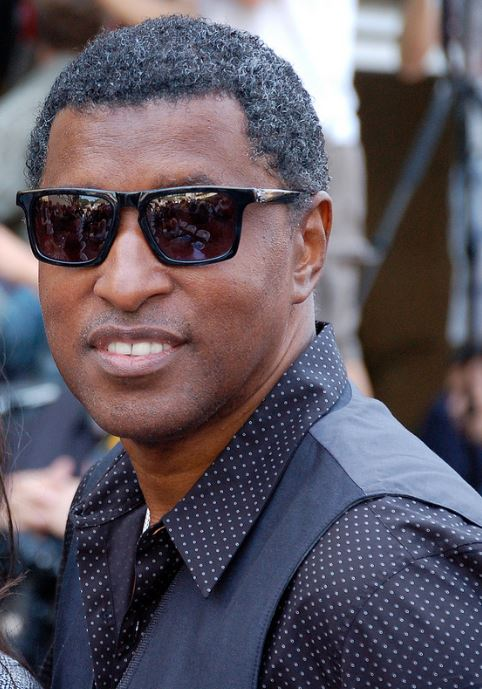
Michael Jackson and Babyface hold the record for most Grammy nominations in one night with 12 nominations.

Michael Jackson and Babyface hold the record for most Grammy nominations in one night with 12 nominations each.

Rank	Artist	Nominations	Year
1	Michael Jackson	12	1984
1	Babyface	12	1997
3	Kendrick Lamar	11	2016
3	Jon Batiste	11	2022
3	Beyoncé	11	2025
3	Raye	11	2027
7	Lauryn Hill	10	1999
7	Kanye West	10	2005
7	Beyoncé	10	2010
7	Eminem	10	2011
11	Paul McCartney	9	1966
11	Roger Miller	9	1966
11	The Manhattan Transfer	9	1986
11	Eric Clapton	9	1993
11	Santana	9	2000
11	Jay-Z	9	2014
11	Beyoncé	9	2017
11	Beyoncé	9	2021
11	Beyoncé	9	2023
11	SZA	9	2024
11	Kendrick Lamar	9	2026
11	Rosalía	9	2027

=== Most nominations without winning ===
With 22 nominations, Chris Gehringer has received the most Grammy nominations without winning.

Rank	Artist	Nominations
1	Chris Gehringer	22
2	Björk	18
2	Zubin Mehta	18
2	Post Malone	18
2	Dave Kutch	18
6	Snoop Dogg	17
6	Fred Hersch	17
8	Brian McKnight	16
9	Joe Satriani	15
9	Dierks Bentley	15
11	Toshiko Akiyoshi	14
11	Martina McBride	14
11	Musiq Soulchild	14
14	Katy Perry	13
14	Spyro Gyra	13
14	José Serebrier	13
14	Charlie Wilson	13
14	Diana Ross	13

=== Most nominations in one night without winning ===
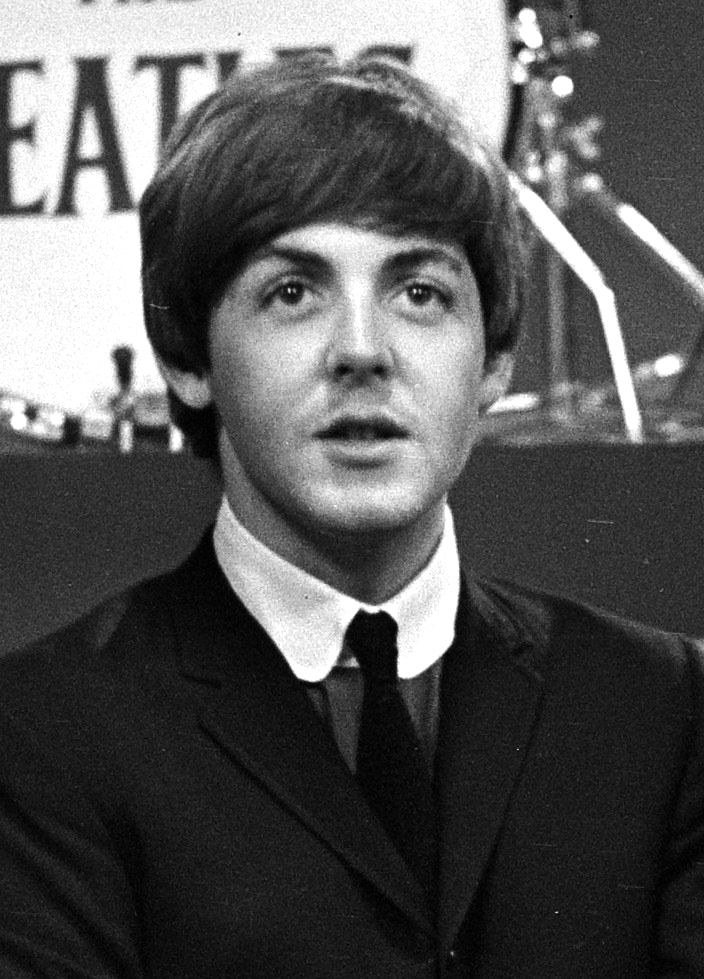
Paul McCartney was nominated for nine awards in 1966 but failed to win

The record for most Grammy nominations without a win in one night is 9, held by Paul McCartney. The record was set in 1966.

Rank	Artist	Nominations
1	Paul McCartney (1966)	9
2	Rihanna (2017)	8
2	Kanye West (2017)	8
2	Jay-Z (2018)	8
2	Justin Bieber (2022)	8
2	Post Malone (2025)	8
7	Stevie Wonder (1983)	7
7	India.Arie (2002)	7
7	Kendrick Lamar (2014)	7
7	Billie Eilish (2022, 2025)	7
11	Henry Mancini (1959)	6
11	Thomas Z. Shepard (1970)	6
11	Lionel Richie (1982)	6
11	David Foster (1986)	6
11	Mariah Carey (1996)	6
11	50 Cent (2006)	6
11	Bruno Mars (2012)	6
11	Roddy Ricch (2021)	6
11	Giveon (2022)	6
11	Mary J. Blige (2023)	6
11	DJ Khaled (2023)	6
11	Jon Batiste (2024)	6
11	Olivia Rodrigo (2024)	6
11	Taylor Swift (2025)	6
11	Sabrina Carpenter (2026)	6

=== Grammy nominations in the most fields ===
Rank	Artist	Number	Fields
1	Quincy Jones	15	General field, spoken word, arranging, music video/film, jazz, pop, rap, R&B, children's, musical theatre, disco, composition, gospel/contemporary Christian music, music for visual media, and production, non-classical
2	Paul McCartney	12	General field, pop, arranging, rock, traditional, music for visual media, music video/film, spoken word, historical, alternative music, rap, and package
3	Bob Dylan	11	General field, country, gospel/contemporary Christian music, rock, music video/film, music for visual media, folk, pop, American roots, traditional, and musical theatre
3	Béla Fleck	11	Country, pop, jazz, American roots, world music, classical, contemporary instrumental, folk, spoken word, historical, composition and arranging
3	Beyoncé	11	General field, pop, R&B, rock, country, American roots, rap, music for visual media, dance/electronic, surround sound and music video/film
6	Jon Batiste	10	General field, pop, contemporary instrumental, new age, R&B, jazz, American roots, classical, music for visual media, and music video/film
7	Janet Jackson	9	General field, pop, R&B, rock, arranging, rap, music video/film, dance/electronic, and production, non-classical
7	John Legend	9	General field, pop, R&B, rap, music for visual media, musical theater, arrangement, gospel/contemporary Christian music, and children's music
7	Willie Nelson	9	General field, contemporary instrumental, pop, country, traditional, American roots, blues, gospel/contemporary Christian music and music video/film
7	Dolly Parton	9	General field, pop, country, traditional, musical theatre, music for visual media, gospel/contemporary Christian music, American roots and audio book
7	Lionel Richie	9	General field, pop, R&B, music for visual media, music video/film, dance/electronic, arranging, gospel/contemporary Christian music and production, non-classical
7	Jack White	9	General field, rock, alternative, country, pop, package, music video/film, American roots and engineered album
7	Stevie Wonder	9	General field, pop, R&B, rap, arranging, composition, music for visual media, music video/film and production, non-classical
7	Sting	9	General field, pop, rock, country, Latin, jazz, music for visual media, reggae and music video/film
7	Pharrell Williams	9	General field, pop, R&B, dance/electronic, rap, global music, music for visual media, music video/film and production, non-classical
16	Elvis Costello	8	General field, pop, rock, music for visual media, spoken word, alternative, American roots and traditional
16	David Foster	8	General field, R&B, composing/arranging, music for visual media, production, music video/film, pop, and musical theatre
16	Herbie Hancock	8	General field, pop, R&B, rock, jazz, music video/film, music for visual media and composition
16	Michael Jackson	8	General field, pop, R&B, rock, disco, children's, music video/film and production, non-classical
16	Elton John	8	General field, pop, musical theatre, rock, music video/film, music for visual media, composition and R&B
16	Cyndi Lauper	8	General field, rock, pop, music video/film, dance/electronic, arranging, American roots and musical theater
16	Joni Mitchell	8	General field, pop, traditional, folk, arranging, package, historical and notes
16	Danger Mouse	8	General field, pop, R&B, rock, rap, alternative, music video/film and production, non-classical
16	Prince	8	General field, pop, R&B, rock, engineered album, music video/film, music for visual media and production, non-classical
16	Rihanna	8	General field, pop, R&B, rap, dance/electronic, music for visual media, music video/film and package
16	Linda Ronstadt	8	General field, pop, rock, country, American roots, children, Latin and music video/film
16	Justin Timberlake	8	General field, pop, R&B, country, rap, music for visual media, dance/electronic and music video/film
16	will.i.am	8	General field, pop, R&B, dance/electronic, rap, engineered album, music video/film and production, non-classical

=== Most Grammy nominated albums ===
No.	Album and Artist	Nominations
1	Thriller — Michael Jackson	14
2	Cowboy Carter — Beyoncé	11
2	The Emancipation of Mimi — Mariah Carey	11
4	Supernatural — Santana	10
4	Genius Loves Company — Ray Charles	10
4	The Blueprint 3 — Jay-Z	10
4	In These Silent Days — Brandi Carlile	10
4	SOS — SZA	10
4	This Music May Contain Hope — Raye	10
4	Lux — Rosalía	10
11	Come on Over — Shania Twain	9
11	All That You Can't Leave Behind — U2	9
11	Recovery — Eminem	9
11	To Pimp a Butterfly — Kendrick Lamar	9
11	Lemonade — Beyoncé	9
11	The Lion King: The Gift — Beyoncé	9
11	Planet Her — Doja Cat	9
11	Brat — Charli XCX	9
19	The Miseducation of Lauryn Hill — Lauryn Hill	8
19	How to Dismantle an Atomic Bomb — U2	8
19	I Am... Sasha Fierce — Beyoncé	8
19	Fearless — Taylor Swift	8
19	1989 — Taylor Swift	8
19	We Are — Jon Batiste	8
19	Renaissance — Beyoncé	8
19	Mr. Morale & the Big Steppers — Kendrick Lamar	8
19	Mayhem — Lady Gaga	8
19	GNX — Kendrick Lamar	8
19	Hit Me Hard and Soft — Billie Eilish	8

=== Artists who had been nominated for all four General Field awards in one night ===
Only fifteen artists have been nominated for all four General Field awards in one night. Lizzo is the oldest person to be nominated for all four awards in one night, at 31 years old; while the youngest person to be nominated is Billie Eilish at 17 years old. Both were nominated in 2020, making it the first time that two artists were nominated for all four awards in one night. This occurred for the second time in 2025, with Sabrina Carpenter and Chappell Roan. In 1968, Bobbie Gentry became the first person to be nominated for all four awards, followed by Christopher Cross in 1981 and Fun. in 2013, becoming the first male artist and first group to be nominated, respectively. In addition, Finneas O'Connell was nominated for all four General Field awards in 2022, but he was not credited as a performing artist in three of the four categories. Cross and Eilish went onto win all four general field awards on their respective nights, the only two artists to ever to do so to date.

Year	Artist
1968	Bobbie Gentry
1981	Christopher Cross
1985	Cyndi Lauper
1989	Tracy Chapman
1991	Mariah Carey
1998	Paula Cole
2002	India Arie
2008	Amy Winehouse
2013	Fun.
2015	Sam Smith
2020	Billie Eilish
2020	Lizzo
2022	Olivia Rodrigo
2025	Sabrina Carpenter
2025	Chappell Roan
2027	Ella Langley

=== Youngest nominees ===
Hazel Monét is the youngest ever Grammy nominee, receiving a nomination for Best Traditional R&B Performance as a featured artist on her mother Victoria Monét's song "Hollywood" at nearly three years old.

Rank	Age	Artist
1	2 years, 348 days	Hazel Monét
2	8 years	Leah Peasall
3	8 years, 160 days	Deleon Richards
4	8 years, 246 days	Bobby Bare Jr.
5	8 years, 322 days	Blue Ivy Carter
6	10 years, 136 days	Hayden Panettiere
7	10 years, 309 days	Stephen Marley
8	11 years	Hannah Peasall
9	12 years, 126 days	Zac Hanson
10	12 years, 155 days	Joey Alexander
11	12 years, 199 days	Michael Jackson
12	12 years, 234 days	Kelvin Grant
13	12 years, 273 days	Billy Gilman
14	14 years, 45 days	Chris "Daddy Mac" Smith
15	14 years, 140 days	Marie Osmond
16	14 years, 182 days	LeAnn Rimes
17	14 years	Sarah Peasall
18	14 years, 197 days	Chris "Mac Daddy" Kelly
19	14 years, 313 days	Luis Miguel
20	14 years, 348 days	Taylor Hanson

=== Oldest nominee ===
In 2024, former United States President Jimmy Carter became the oldest Grammy nominee, at 100 years old.

== See also ==
- Latin Grammy Award records
- List of Academy Award records
- List of Tony Award records
- List of EGOT winners
