= List of American Grammy Award winners and nominees =

The following is a list of Grammy Awards winners and nominees from the United States.

== Winners ==
Nominee	Wins	Nominations
Beyoncé	35	99
Georg Solti	31	74
Chick Corea	29	77
Quincy Jones	28	80
Alison Krauss	27	44
Kendrick Lamar	27	75
Stevie Wonder	25	74
John Williams	25	73
Vladimir Horowitz	25	45
Jay-Z	25	88
Kanye West	24	75
Vince Gill	22	47
David Frost	25	34
Henry Mancini	20	72
Bruce Springsteen	20	50
Pat Metheny	20	37
Al Schmitt	20	36
Kirk Franklin	20	33
Tony Bennett	19	41
Yo-Yo Ma	19	29
Aretha Franklin	18	44
CeCe Winans	18	35
Jimmy Sturr	18	24
Ray Charles	17	37
Alicia Keys	17	32
Leonard Bernstein	16	63
James Mallinson	16	49
Lady Gaga	16	45
Robert Shaw	16	38
Paul Simon; Steven Epstein	16	35
Bruno Mars	16	36
Eminem	15	44
Foo Fighters	15	34
Taylor Swift	14	58
Pharrell Williams	14	43
Bela Fleck	14	34
Jerry Douglas	14	33
Phil Ramone	14	32
Alison Krauss and Union Station	14	18
Jay David Saks	13	53
Emmylou Harris	13	47
John Legend	13	40
Michael Jackson	13	38
Johnny Cash	13	35
Bonnie Raitt	13	31
Robert Woods	13	29
Taylor Hawkins	13	26
Leontyne Price	13	25
Ella Fitzgerald	13	20
T Bone Burnett	13	18
Willie Nelson	12	57
Babyface	12	53
Thomas Z Shepard	12	50
Michael Tilson Thomas	12	39
Jack White	12	34
Chris Stapleton	12	26
The Chicks	12	19
Jay Newland	12	17
Shirley Caesar	11	28
Brandi Carlile	11	26
Finneas O'Connell	11	26
Jack Antonoff	11	24
Al Green	11	21
Joni Mitchell	11	19
Arif Mardin; Roger Miller	11	18
Dolly Parton	10	54
Andre Previn	10	44
Justin Timberlake	10	39
Bob Dylan	10	38
James Levine	10	37
Billie Eilish	10	34
Linda Ronstadt	10	27
Chaka Khan	10	22
Bobby McFerrin	10	18
Carlos Santana	10	14
Pat Metheny Group	10	13
Mary J. Blige	9	38
Rihanna	9	33
Frank Sinatra; Sheryl Crow	9	31
Randy Merrill	9	30
James Blackwood	9	26
André 3000	9	25
Natalie Cole; Metallica	9	21
Count Basie	9	20
Skrillex	9	20
Norah Jones	10	20
Hillary Scott	9	15
Emerson String Quartet	9	13
Barbra Streisand	8	48
Luther Vandross	8	33
Asleep At The Wheel	8	27
Jon Batiste; Tina Turner	8	25
Beck	8	23
Usher	8	22
The-Dream	8	21
Fergie	8	20
Take 6 Lauryn Hill; Blackwood Brothers	8	19
Anita Baker; Rick Rubin; James Blackwood Jr.	8	18
Kacey Musgraves	8	17
Carrie Underwood	8	16
Ziggy Marley	8	15
Eddie Palmieri	8	14
The Manhattan Transfer; Art Garfunkel; Anderson .Paak	8	13
Santana	8	12
Stephen Marley	8	11
Benny Rietveld	8	9
Prince	7	38
SZA	7	31
Madonna	7	28
will.i.am Dr. Dre	7	26
Doc Watson; Randy Newman	7	23
Gladys Knight	7	22
Thomas Frost; Randy Brecker	7	21
John Mayer	7	19
Randy Travis	7	16
Los Tigres del Norte	7	15
Jacob Collier	7	15
Toni Braxton	7	14
Simon & Garfunkel; Ricky Skaggs and Kentucky Thunder	7	11
Leslie Ann Jones	7	9
Whitney Houston	6	25
Robert M. Jones	6	23
PJ Morton	6	22
D'Mile	6	20
Amy Grant; James Taylor	6	19
Eagles; Big Boi; Earth, Wind & Fire	6	18
Questlove	6	17
Bad Bunny; Israel Houghton; OutKast	6	16
Black Eyed Peas; Dr. John; The Chemical Brothers	6	15
Tito Puente	6	12
Tim Martyn	6	10
St. Vincent	6	8
Samara Joy	6	7
Drake	5	56
Mariah Carey	5	34
Lil Wayne	5	27
Janet Jackson	5	26
H.E.R.	5	25
Billy Joel	5	23
Christina Aguilera	5	20
Donna Summer; Cee Lo Green	5	18
Mary Chapin Carpenter "Weird Al" Yankovic	5	17
Robert Glasper; Peter, Paul & Mary	5	16
Dionne Warwick; Michael McDonald	5	14
Sandi Patty; Kuk Harrell	5	13
Maria Schneider; Childish Gambino; Brandon Lake	5	12
Lady A	5	11
Christopher Cross	5	9
David Russell (guitarist); Flaco Jimenez; Ward Swingle	5	8
Benny Faccone	5	5
India.arie	4	23
Missy Elliott	4	22
Timbaland	4	21
Erykah Badu; Keith Urban	4	19
Lyle Lovett	4	18
Kelly Rowland	4	17
Yolanda Adams	4	16
Lizzo; Tracy Chapman; The Weeknd	4	13
Marvin Hamlisch; Lisa Lopes; Sounwave	4	12
Marc Anthony; Phoebe Bridgers; Shane McAnally	4	11
Jimmy Carter	4	10
Lenny Kravitz; Carole King; Sade	4	9
Robert Spano; Will Smith; The White Stripes; Little Joe (singer)	4	8
Pepe Aguilar; Randy Scruggs	4	7
Killer Mike	4	5
Silk Sonic	4	4
R. Kelly	3	26
Pink; Ludacris; Ariana Grande	3	20
T.I; Kenny Rogers	3	19
Gwen Stefani; Loretta Lynn	3	18
Etta James; Kelly Clarkson	3	17
Bill Holman; Reba McEntire	3	16
Future	3	15
Elvis Presley; Harry Connick Jr. Destiny's Child; The Roots; Olivia Rodrigo	3	14
Clare Fischer; Puff Daddy; Maroon 5 Maxwell; Diplo	3	13
Gloria Estefan; Red Hot Chili Peppers	3	12
Los Lobos; Vikki Carr; Fiona Apple; Lori McKenna; Hit-Boy; Tyler, the Creator	3	11
Rob Thomas; Shawn Colvin; Taj Mahal; Dua Lipa; Victoria Monét; Miley Cyrus	3	10
Steely Dan; Harry Styles	3	9
James Brown; Chance the Rapper; Ross Bagdasarian Sr. Randy Meisner	3	8
The Carpenters; Justice	3	7
The Flaming Lips; Megan Thee Stallion; Lin-Manuel Miranda; Boygenius; Tori Kelly; Wendy Carlos	3	6
Bob Newhart; Esperanza Spalding; Toto; Brandon Bell; Dan + Shay	3	5
Tool; Lenny White; Pentatonix	3	3
Chris Brown	2	25
J. Cole; Jazmine Sullivan	2	18
Cyndi Lauper	2	16
Melissa Etheridge; David Guetta	2	15
Peter Kater; Randy Owen	2	14
Patti LaBelle; T-Pain	2	13
Marvin Gaye; Kenny Loggins; Sabrina Carpenter	2	12
Barry White; Black Thought; Lil Nas X Bon Iver; Alan Bartram	2	11
Yehudi Menuhin; Nine Inch Nails; Kaytranada	2	10
Intocable; No Doubt; Brian Wilson; James Blake; Jennifer Hudson; Fred again..	2	9
Peter Nero; Nate Ruess; SoundgardenDoechii	2	8
Gloria Gaynor; La Mafia; LeAnn Rimes; Brave Combo; Fleetwood Mac; Frank Ocean; Nashville Bluegrass Band; Billy Strings	2	7
Linkin Park; Andrew Dost; Evanescence; Natalie Hemby; Kylie Minogue; Aaron Dessner; Lauren Daigle	2	6
Nate "Danja" Hills; Otis Redding; Bobby Darin; Vernon Reid; Colbie Caillat; Lorde; Nipsey Hussle; Slayer	2	5
Taylor Eigsti; Ted Nash; Jason Mraz; Denny Laine Cage the Elephant	2	4
Little Joe y La Familia; Lisa Fischer; Rufus; Thundercat; David Robertson; Molly Tuttle; Brandon Vamos; Randy Spendlove	2	3
Selena; Judy Garland	2	2
Doja Cat	1	19
Kenny G Nas; Brandy Clark	1	17
Elvis Costello	1	15
50 Cent; Ledisi; Pearl Jam	1	14
Ray Barretto; Miguel; Burna Boy; Megadeth	1	13
Carter Beauford; Brandy; Fantasia; Gorillaz	1	12
Cardi B Crystal Gayle; 21 Savage; Slipknot	1	11
DJ Khaled; Q-Tip; Chicago (band); David Crosby; Nashville Brass with Danny Davis	1	10
The Neptunes; Bon Jovi; Arcade Fire; Roddy Ricch; Kenny Gamble	1	9
Ashanti; Al Hirt; Britney Spears; Mariachi Divas; John McLaughlin Williams; Stephen Stills; Sara Bareilles; Faith Evans; Lil Baby; Dan Nigro; Graham Nash; Chris Brown; Elevation Worship; Coco Jones	1	8
Cher; Queen Latifah; Mongo Santamaria; Paula Cole; Nat King Cole; Rhonda Vincent; Dante Bowe	1	7
Steve Lacy; Stargate; Bobby Bare; Crosby, Stills & Nash; Nirvana; Twenty One Pilots; Calvin Harris; Judas Priest; Baby Keem Mastodon; Randy Thornton	1	6
Emilio Navaira; Ciara; Fun (band); Richard Marx; Sue Mingus; Tiffany Hudson	1	5
Enrique Iglesias; The Chainsmokers; Steve Jordan; Pink Floyd; Michelle Branch; Frank Yankovic; Kentucky Headhunters; Imagine Dragons; Alfred Newman; Julieta Venegas Motörhead; Ghost; Monica; Hykeem Carter; Leon Bridges; Ella Mai; Muni Long; Weezer; Theron Thomas; Lil Durk; System of a Down; Joe L Barnes	1	4
Ian Brennan; Cal Tjader; Mariachi los Camperos; Texas Tornados; Los Palominos; Meghan Trainor; La Santa Cecilia; Lila Downs; The Band Perry; Lupillo Rivera; Nadia Shpachenko; Andra Day; James Steven Ginsburg (producer); Mýa; Amanda Lindsey Cook; James Earl Jones; Brandon Davis; Brandon Harding; Brandon Patrick George; Brandon Victor Dixon; Randy Waldman	1	3
Creed; Gloria Cheng; Bacilos; Los Super Seven; The Legends; Paula Abdul; Bobby Brown; Bo Burnham FKA twigs Otha Nash; America (band); Lisa Loeb & Nine Stories; Edgar Barrera; Dirty Vegas; Joel Little; Randy Holland	1	2
Gilley's Urban Cowboy Band; Jesse Harris; Sirah; Solange; Chris Perez; Stephen McLaughlin; Chente Barrera; Los Texmaniacs; Ted Nash Big Band; Jessica Rivera; Puff Daddy & The Family; The Product G&B; Timothy Fallon; Freddie Nartinez, Jr. Daya; Brandie Lane; Brandon Jones; John Brancy; Randy Ellis; Randy Kelly; Randy Thomas; Randy Urbanski; Brady Nasfell; Brandon Johnson; Brandon Perdue; Peter Brandt; Randy Caballero; Randy Everett; Randy Kohrs	1	1

== Nominations without winning ==
Nominee	Wins	Nominations
Post Malone	0	18
Brian McKnight	0	17
Snoop Dogg; Björk	0	16
Joe Satriani	0	15
Martina McBride; Dierks Bentley	0	14
Katy Perry; Spyro Gyra; Musiq Soulchild	0	13
Diana Ross; Lenny Gomulka & Chicago Push; Busta Rhymes; Nicki Minaj	0	12
Connie Smith; Vanessa L. Williams; R. Carlos Nakai; Lana Del Rey	0	11
Willie Colon; Wiz Khalifa; Janelle Monáe; Travis Scott	0	10
Sia Eddie Blazoncyk's Versatone; Arctic Monkeys	0	9
Eddie Blazonczyk Jr. Backstreet Boys; NSYNC; Rosemary Clooney; Blake Shelton; Avril Lavigne; Jackson Browne; Disclosure	0	8
Joan Osborne; Bobby Osborne; Black Pumas; Brandon Flowers	0	7
Allen Toussaint Anthrax; B.o.B; Jhené Aiko; DaBaby; Florence and the Machine	0	6
Aaliyah; Michael Feinstein; Nickelback; Tevin Campbell; Seth MacFarlane; Flo Rida; Linda Perry; BTS; Jessie Jo Dillon; Brandon Heath Knell; Randy Williams; Lamb of God	0	5
Tamar Braxton; Paula Scher; The Fray; Bernadette Peters; Charlie Puth; Bebe Rexha; Ice Spice; Iggy Azalea; Lil Uzi Vert Pantera; The Notorious B.I.G.	0	4
Jim James; John Berry; James Bay; Fania All-Stars; Charlie Byrd; Camila Cabello; Nancy Sinatra; Hanson; Jaci Velasquez; Guns N' Roses; Ingrid Andress; DMX; Metro Boomin; Labrinth; Foreigner; Killswitch Engage; Brady Ebert; Brady Rymer; D. Randy Blythe; Randy Ebright; Brady Rymer and the Little Band That Could	0	3
Selena Gomez; Panic! at the Disco Logic; Luke James; Jennifer Lopez; Dusty Springfield; Mazz; ASAP Rocky; Fulanito; Crosby, Stills, Nash & Young; Sonny & Cher; Liza Minnelli; Kesha; Halsey; Billie Holiday; Howie Epstein; Kris Kross; Demi Lovato; Fall Out Boy; I Prevail; D Smoke; Emily King; The Spinners; Latto; Jelly Roll; The War and Treaty; Justin Tranter; Coi Leray; Ellie Goulding; Taylor Dayne; Troye Sivan; Gracie Abrams; Madison Beer; Sierra Hull; Ray Barretto And New World Spirit; Shadows Fall; Suicidal Tendencies; Brady Goodwin; Brando Mireles; Brandon Bonfiglio; Brandon Casey; Brandon David; Doug Brand; Grant David Brandell; King Diamond; Randy Armstrong; Randy Crawford; Randy Staub; Randy Weston; Randy Wood; Wayne Brady; August Burns Red	0	2
Ro James; Michael Bishop; Jimmy Rushing; Mariachi Reyna; Victoria Livengood; Victoria Preminger; Los Humildes; Salvador Torres; Narciso Martínez; Cameron Carpenter; Jorge Moreno; The Byrds; The Partridge Family; Mikky Ekko; Jessica Thompson; Jessica Cooper; Lisa Kekaula; Priscilla Hubbard; John Carter; Blackwood Andrus Run-DMC; Billy Gilman; Juicy J Jordin Sparks; Mac Miller; Noah Cyrus; Chika; Adam Lambert; Kenny Lattimore; Karyn White; Journey (band); New Edition; New Kids on the Block; Foxy Brown; Paul Waggoner; Poppy; Knocked Loose; Noah Kahan; Anne-Marie Addison Rae; Alex Warren; Katseye; Sombr; The Marías; Luther "Guitar Junior" Johnson and the Magic Rockers; The Wreckers; Lee Brice; Brandy Seals; Brandee Younger; Brandon Armstrong; Brandon Arolfo; Brandon Barnes; Brandon Bost; Hatebreed; Machine Head; As I lay Dying; Modern Mandolin Quartet	0	1
