= Grammy Award for Producer of the Year, Classical =

Prestigious award for Classical music producers

- Awarded for: quality classical music production
- Country: United States
- Presented by: National Academy of Recording Arts and Sciences
- First award: February 27, 1980; 46 years ago (as Grammy Award for Classical Producer of the Year)
- Currently held by: Elaine Martone (2026)
- Website: grammy.com

The Grammy Award for Producer of the Year, Classical is an honor presented to record producers for quality classical music productions at the Grammy Awards, a ceremony that was established in 1958 and originally called the Gramophone Awards. Honors in several categories are presented at the ceremony annually by the National Academy of Recording Arts and Sciences of the United States to "honor artistic achievement, technical proficiency and overall excellence in the recording industry, without regard to album sales or chart position".

Originally known as the Grammy Award for Classical Producer of the Year, the award was first presented to James Mallinson at the 22nd Grammy Awards (1980). The name remained unchanged until 1998, when the category became known as Producer of the Year, Classical. According to the category description guide for the 52nd Grammy Awards, the award is presented to album producers "whose recordings, released for the first time during the eligibility year, represent consistently outstanding creativity in the production of classical recordings". Producers must have produced at least 51% playing time on three separately released recordings (only one of which can be an opera released in DVD format). Producers may submit content as a team only if they worked together exclusively during the period of eligibility. Anthony Tommasini, music critic for The New York Times, asserted that "In the struggling field of classical recording, it's the producers who take the real risks and make things happen." The honor is presented alongside the award for Producer of the Year, Non-Classical.

As of 2023, David Frost, the son of Thomas Frost, who received an award in the same category in 1987, Steven Epstein, Robert Woods and Judith Sherman share the record for most wins, with seven each, while James Mallinson, Blanton Alspaugh and Elaine Martone have been presented the award three times. Two-time recipients include Joanna Nickrenz (once alongside Marc Aubort), who was also the first female to both be nominated and win the award. Steven Epstein holds the record for most nominations in the category, with 19, followed closely by James Mallinson at 18. Robina G. Young and Jay David Saks hold the record for most nominations without a win, with 10 each.

== Recipients ==
=== 1980s ===
Year	Producer
1980
1980	James Mallinson
1980	Marc Aubort and Joanna Nickrenz
1980	Andrew Kazdin
1980	Paul Myers
1980	Vittorio Negri
1980	Thomas Z. Shepard
1980	Robert Woods
1981
1981	Robert Woods
1981	Steven Epstein
1981	Andrew Kazdin
1981	John McClure
1981	Paul Myers
1982
1982	James Mallinson
1982	Steven Epstein
1982	Andrew Kazdin
1982	Jay David Saks
1982	Robert Woods
1983
1983	Robert Woods
1983	Samuel H. Carter and Glenn Gould
1983	Steven Epstein
1983	James Mallinson
1983	Jay David Saks
1984
1984	Marc Aubort and Joanna Nickrenz
1984	Andrew Cornall
1984	Steven Epstein
1984	Steven Paul
1984	Jay David Saks
1985
1985	Steven Epstein
1985	Marc Aubort and Joanna Nickrenz
1985	Jay David Saks
1985	Thomas Z. Shepard
1985	Robert Woods
1986
1986	Robert Woods
1986	Steven Epstein
1986	James Mallinson
1986	David Mottley
1986	Jay David Saks
1987
1987	Thomas Frost
1987	Marc Aubort and Joanna Nickrenz
1987	Steven Epstein
1987	Jay David Saks
1987	Robert Woods
1988
1988	Robert Woods
1988	Steven Epstein
1988	Thomas Frost
1988	Michael Haas
1988	Jay David Saks
1989
1989	Robert Woods
1989	Andrew Cornall
1989	Steven Epstein
1989	Thomas Frost
1989	Joanna Nickrenz

=== 1990s ===
Year	Producer
1990
1990	Robert Woods
1990	Wolf Erichson
1990	Michael Haas
1990	Patti Laursen
1990	Elizabeth Ostrow
1991
1991	Adam Stern
1991	Michael Fine
1991	Judith Sherman
1991	Hans Weber
1991	Max Wilcox
1992
1992	James Mallinson
1992	Steven Epstein
1992	Thomas Frost
1992	Jay David Saks
1992	Hans Weber
1993
1993	Michael Fine
1993	Andrew Cornall
1993	Steven Epstein
1993	Thomas Frost
1993	James Mallinson
1994
1994	Judith Sherman
1994	Andrew Cornall
1994	Michael Haas
1994	Adam Stern
1994	Robina G. Young
1995
1995	Andrew Cornall
1995	Anna Barry
1995	Wilhelm Hellweg
1995	Judith Sherman
1995	Max Wilcox
1996
1996	Steven Epstein
1996	Andrew Cornall
1996	John Fraser
1996	Jay David Saks
1996	Michael Woolcock
1997
1997	Joanna Nickrenz
1997	Manfred Eicher
1997	James Mallinson
1997	Martin Sauer
1997	Gary Schultz
1998
1998	Steven Epstein
1998	Wolf Erichson
1998	J. Tamblyn Henderson Jr.
1998	Andrew Keener
1998	Judith Sherman
1999
1999	Steven Epstein
1999	Manfred Eicher
1999	James Mallinson
1999	Andreas Neubronner
1999	Robina G. Young

=== 2000s ===
Year	Producer
2000
2000	Adam Abeshouse
2000	Andrew Keener
2000	Marina A. Ledin and Victor Ledin
2000	James Mallinson
2000	Robina G. Young
2001
2001	Steven Epstein
2001	Manfred Eicher
2001	John Fraser
2001	Thomas Frost
2001	James Mallinson
2002
2002	Manfred Eicher
2002	David Frost
2002	James Mallinson
2002	Joanna Nickrenz
2002	Robina G. Young
2003
2003	Robert Woods
2003	Andrew Cornall
2003	Manfred Eicher
2003	James Mallinson
2003	Robina G. Young
2004
2004	Steven Epstein
2004	Adam Abeshouse
2004	Manfred Eicher
2004	Marina A. Ledin and Victor Ledin
2004	Robina G. Young
2005
2005	David Frost
2005	Manfred Eicher
2005	James Mallinson
2005	Robina G. Young
2005	Daniel Zalay
2006
2006	Tim Handley
2006	Christopher Alder
2006	Steven Epstein
2006	Michael Fine
2006	Thomas C. Moore
2007
2007	Elaine Martone
2007	Manfred Eicher
2007	Stephen Johns
2007	James Mallinson
2007	Sid McLauchlan
2008
2008	Judith Sherman
2008	Blanton Alspaugh
2008	John Fraser
2008	Marina A. Ledin and Victor Ledin
2008	Robina G. Young
2009
2009	David Frost
2009	David Groves
2009	Judith Sherman
2009	Robert Woods
2009	Robina G. Young

=== 2010s ===
Year	Producer
2010
2010	Steven Epstein
2010	Blanton Alspaugh
2010	John Fraser
2010	David Frost
2010	James Mallinson
2011
2011	David Frost
2011	Blanton Alspaugh
2011	Tim Handley
2011	Marina A. Ledin and Victor Ledin
2011	James Mallinson
2012
2012	Judith Sherman
2012	Blanton Alspaugh
2012	Manfred Eicher
2012	David Frost
2012	Peter Ruitenberg
2013
2013	Blanton Alspaugh
2013	Tim Handley
2013	Marina Ledin and Victor Ledin
2013	James Mallinson
2013	Dan Merceruio
2014
2014	David Frost
2014	Manfred Eicher
2014	Marina Ledin and Victor Ledin
2014	James Mallinson
2014	Jay David Saks
2015
2015	Judith Sherman
2015	Morten Lindberg
2015	Dimitriy Lipay
2015	Elaine Martone
2015	David Starobin
2016
2016	Judith Sherman
2016	Blanton Alspaugh
2016	Manfred Eicher
2016	Marina A. Ledin and Victor Ledin
2016	Dan Merceruio
2017
2017	David Frost
2017	Blanton Alspaugh
2017	Marina A. Ledin and Victor Ledin
2017	Judith Sherman
2017	Robina G. Young
2018
2018	David Frost
2018	Blanton Alspaugh
2018	Manfred Eicher
2018	Morten Lindberg
2018	Judith Sherman
2019
2019	Blanton Alspaugh
2019	David Frost
2019	Elizabeth Ostrow
2019	Judith Sherman
2019	Dirk Sobotka

=== 2020s ===
Year	Producer
2020
2020	Blanton Alspaugh
2020	James Ginsburg
2020	Marina A. Ledin and Victor Ledin
2020	Morten Lindberg
2020	Dirk Sobotka
2021
2021	David Frost
2021	Blanton Alspaugh
2021	Jesse Lewis
2021	Dmitriy Lipay
2021	Elaine Martone
2022
2022	Judith Sherman
2022	Blanton Alspaugh
2022	Steven Epstein
2022	David Frost
2022	Elaine Martone
2023
2023	Judith Sherman
2023	Jonathan Allen
2023	Christoph Franke
2023	James Ginsburg
2023	Elaine Martone
2024
2024	Elaine Martone
2024	David Frost
2024	Morten Lindberg
2024	Dmitriy Lipay
2024	Brian Pidgeon
2025
2025	Elaine Martone
2025	Erica Brenner
2025	Christoph Franke
2025	Morten Lindberg
2025	Dmitriy Lipay
2025	Dirk Sobotka
2026
2026	Elaine Martone
2026	Blanton Alspaugh
2026	Sergei Kvitko
2026	Morten Lindberg
2026	Dmitriy Lipay
2027	Winner TBA on 7 February 2027
2027	Blanton Alspaugh
2027	Silas Brown
2027	Dmitriy Lipay
2027	Elaine Martone
2027	Dirk Sobotka

^{^[I]} Each year is linked to the article about the Grammy Awards held that year.

== Producers with multiple wins ==
7 wins

- David Frost
- Steven Epstein
- Robert Woods
- Judith Sherman

4 wins

- Elaine Martone

3 wins

- Blanton Alspaugh
- James Mallinson

2 wins

- Joanna Nickrenz

== Producers with multiple nominations ==
19 nominations

- Steven Epstein

18 nominations

- James Mallinson

14 nominations

- Judith Sherman

13 nominations

- David Frost

12 nominations

- Robert Woods
- Blanton Alspaugh
- Manfred Eicher

10 nominations

- Robina G. Young
- Jay David Saks

9 nominations

- Marina A. Ledin
- Victor Ledin

7 nominations

- Elaine Martone
- Andrew Cornall

6 nominations

- Joanna Nickrenz

5 nominations

- Morten Lindberg

4 nominations

- John Fraser
- Marc Aubort

3 nominations

- Dmitriy Lipay
- Dirk Sobotka
- Tim Handley
- Michael Haas
- Andrew Kazdin

2 nominations

- Christoph Franke
- James Ginsburg
- Elizabeth Ostrow
- Dan Merceruio
- Adam Abeshouse
- Max Wilcox
- Adam Stern
- Wolf Erichson
- Andrew Keener
- Hans Weber

== See also ==
- American classical music
- List of Grammy Award categories
