= 24th Annual Grammy Awards =

1982 US music awards ceremony

- Date: February 24, 1982
- Location: Shrine Auditorium, Los Angeles
- Hosted by: John Denver
- Most awards: Quincy Jones (5)
- Most nominations: Quincy Jones (8)

Television/radio coverage
- Network: CBS

The 24th Annual Grammy Awards were held on February 24, 1982, at the Shrine Auditorium in Los Angeles, and were broadcast live on American television. The event recognized the accomplishments of musicians during the year 1981. Quincy Jones was the major recipient of awards with a total of five Grammys.

The Album of the Year award went to Jack Douglas, John Lennon and Yoko Ono for Double Fantasy, and Song of the Year went to Donna Weiss and Jackie DeShannon for "Bette Davis Eyes".

== Presenters ==
- The Pointer Sisters - Best New Artist
- Jerry Lee Lewis & Mickey Gilley - Best Country Vocal Performance Duo or Group and Best Country Vocal Performance Female
- George Carlin - Reads the rules for the Grammy nominations
- Carol Channing & Ben Vereen - Best Cast Show Album
- Adam Ant & Ted Nugent - Best Rock Vocal Performance Male
- Carole Bayer Sager & Peter Allen - Presented the songwriters
- John Denver - Song of the Year
- Reba Rambo & Shirley Caesar - Announced the winners and nominees in the Soul/Gospel category
- Anne Murray & Peggy Lee - Best Pop Vocal Performance Female and Male and Producer of the Year
- Melissa Manchester & Glen Campbell - Announced winners in previous categories
- James Brown & Tina Turner - Best R&B Vocal Performance Male
- John Williams - Announced winners of the classical categories
- Chuck Mangione & Harry James - Best Jazz Vocal Performance and Jazz Instrumental Performance Soloist
- Herb Alpert & Barbara Mandrell - Album of the Year
- Pat Benatar & Kenny Loggins - Record of the Year

== Performers ==
- James Ingram - Just Once
- Shelly West & David Frizzell - You're The Reason God Make Oklahoma
- Terri Gibbs - Somebody's Knockin'
- The Oak Ridge Boys - Elvira
- The cast of Sophisticated Ladies - It Don't Mean a Thing
- Rick Springfield - Jessie's Girl
- Christopher Cross & Burt Bacharach - Arthur's Theme
- Bill Withers - Just the Two of Us
- Lionel Richie - Endless Love
- Jackie DeShannon & Donna Weiss - Bette Davis Eyes
- Al Green - The Lord Will Make a Way
- The Archers (musical group) - Everyday
- Joe Cocker - I'm So Glad I'm Standing Here Today
- Sheena Easton - For Your Eyes Only
- Rick James - Give It To Me Baby
- Pepper Adams & Al Jarreau - (Round, Round, Round) Blue Rondo A La Turk

== Award winners ==
- Record of the Year
  - Val Garay (producer) & Kim Carnes for "Bette Davis Eyes"
- Album of the Year
  - Jack Douglas (producer), John Lennon & Yoko Ono (producers and artists) for Double Fantasy
- Song of the Year
  - Donna Weiss & Jackie DeShannon (songwriters) for "Bette Davis Eyes" performed by Kim Carnes
- Best New Artist
  - Sheena Easton

=== Children's ===
- Best Recording for Children
  - Dennis Scott & Jim Henson (producers) for Sesame Country performed by The Muppets, Glen Campbell, Crystal Gayle, Loretta Lynn & Tanya Tucker

=== Classical ===
- Best Classical Orchestral Recording
  - James Mallinson (producer), Georg Solti (conductor) & the Chicago Symphony Orchestra & Chorus for Mahler: Symphony No. 2 in C Minor
- Best Classical Vocal Soloist Performance
  - Richard Bonynge (conductor), Marilyn Horne, Luciano Pavarotti, Joan Sutherland & the New York City Opera Orchestra for Live From Lincoln Center – Sutherland/Horne/Pavarotti
- Best Opera Recording
  - James Mallinson (producer), Charles Mackerras (conductor), Jiri Zahradnicek, Ivo Žídek, Václav Zítek & the Vienna Philharmonic Orchestra for Janáček: From the House of the Dead
- Best Choral Performance (other than opera)
  - Neville Marriner (conductor) & the Academy of St Martin in the Fields & Chorus for Haydn: The Creation
- Best Classical Performance – Instrumental Soloist or Soloists (with orchestra)
  - Zubin Mehta (conductor), Itzhak Perlman, Isaac Stern, Pinchas Zukerman & the New York Philharmonic for Isaac Stern 60th Anniversary Celebration
- Best Classical Performance – Instrumental Soloist or Soloists (without orchestra)
  - Vladimir Horowitz for The Horowitz Concerts 1979/80
- Best Chamber Music Performance
  - Vladimir Ashkenazy, Lynn Harrell & Itzhak Perlman for Tchaikovsky: Piano Trio in A Minor
- Best Classical Album
  - James Mallinson (producer), Georg Solti (conductor) & the Chicago Symphony Orchestra & Chorus for Mahler: Symphony No. 2 in C Minor

=== Comedy ===
- Best Comedy Recording
  - Richard Pryor for Rev. Du Rite

=== Composing and arranging ===
- Best Instrumental Composition
  - Mike Post (composer) for "The Theme From Hill Street Blues"
- Best Album of Original Score Written for a Motion Picture or a Television Special
  - John Williams (composer) for Raiders of the Lost Ark
- Best Instrumental Arrangement
  - Quincy Jones & Johnny Mandel (arrangers) for "Velas" performed by Quincy Jones
- Best Instrumental Arrangement Accompanying Vocal(s)
  - Jerry Hey & Quincy Jones (arrangers) for "Ai No Corrida" performed by Quincy Jones
- Best Vocal Arrangement for Two or More Voices
  - Gene Puerling (arranger) for "A Nightingale Sang in Berkeley Square" performed by The Manhattan Transfer

=== Country ===
- Best Country Vocal Performance, Female
  - Dolly Parton for "9 to 5"
- Best Country Vocal Performance, Male
  - Ronnie Milsap for "(There's) No Gettin' Over Me"
- Best Country Performance by a Duo or Group with Vocal
  - The Oak Ridge Boys for "Elvira"
- Best Country Instrumental Performance
  - Chet Atkins for Country After All These Years
- Best Country Song
  - Dolly Parton (songwriter) for "9 to 5"

=== Folk ===
- Best Ethnic or Traditional Recording
  - There Must Be a Better World Somewhere-B. B. King

=== Gospel ===
- Best Gospel Performance, Traditional
  - The Masters V for The Masters V
- Best Gospel Performance, Contemporary or Inspirational
  - The Imperials for Priority
- Best Soul Gospel Performance, Traditional
  - Al Green for The Lord Will Make a Way
- Best Soul Gospel Performance, Contemporary
  - Andrae Crouch for Don't Give Up
- Best Inspirational Performance
  - B.J. Thomas for Amazing Grace

=== Historical ===
- Best Historical Album
  - Michael Brooks & George Spitzer (producers) for Hoagy Carmichael – From Stardust to Ole Buttermilk Sky

=== Jazz ===
- Best Jazz Vocal Performance, Female
  - Ella Fitzgerald for Digital III at Montreux
- Best Jazz Vocal Performance, Male
  - Al Jarreau for "(Round, Round, Round) Blue Rondo à la Turk"
- Best Jazz Vocal Performance, Duo or Group
  - The Manhattan Transfer for "Until I Met You (Corner Pocket)"
- Best Jazz Instrumental Performance, Soloist
  - John Coltrane for Bye Bye Blackbird
- Best Instrumental Jazz Performance, Group
  - Chick Corea & Gary Burton for In Concert, Zürich, October 28, 1979
- Best Jazz Instrumental Performance, Big Band
  - Gerry Mulligan for Walk on the Water
- Best Jazz Fusion Performance, Vocal or Instrumental
  - Grover Washington, Jr. for Winelight

=== Latin ===
- Best Latin Recording
  - Clare Fischer for "Guajira Pa la Jeva"

=== Musical show ===
- Best Cast Show Album
  - Quincy Jones (producer) & Lena Horne for Lena Horne: The Lady and Her Music

=== Music video ===
- Video of the Year
  - Michael Nesmith for Michael Nesmith in Elephant Parts

=== Packaging and notes ===
- Best Album Package
  - Peter Corriston (art director) for Tattoo You performed by The Rolling Stones
- Best Album Notes
  - Dan Morgenstern (notes writer) for Erroll Garner – Master of the Keyboard performed by Erroll Garner

=== Pop ===
- Best Pop Vocal Performance, Female
  - Lena Horne for Lena Horne: The Lady and Her Music
- Best Pop Vocal Performance, Male
  - Al Jarreau for Breakin' Away
- Best Pop Performance by a Duo or Group with Vocal
  - The Manhattan Transfer for "The Boy from New York City"
- Best Pop Instrumental Performance
  - Larry Carlton & Mike Post for "The Theme from Hill Street Blues"

=== Production and engineering ===
- Best Engineered Recording, Non-Classical
  - Bill Schnee, Elliot Scheiner, Jerry Garszva & Roger Nichols (engineers) for Gaucho performed by Steely Dan
- Best Engineered Recording, Classical
  - Andrew Kazdin, Edward (Bud) T. Graham, Ray Moore (engineers), Zubin Mehta (conductor), Isaac Stern, Itzhak Perlman, Pinchas Zukerman, & the New York Philharmonic for Isaac Stern 60th Anniversary Celebration
- Producer of the Year
  - Quincy Jones
- Classical Producer of the Year
  - James Mallinson

=== R&B ===
- Best R&B Vocal Performance, Female
  - Aretha Franklin for "Hold On I'm Comin'"
- Best R&B Vocal Performance, Male
  - James Ingram for "One Hundred Ways"
- Best R&B Performance by a Duo or Group with Vocal
  - Quincy Jones for The Dude
- Best R&B Instrumental Performance
  - David Sanborn for "All I Need Is You"
- Best Rhythm & Blues Song
  - Bill Withers, Ralph MacDonald & William Salter (songwriters) for "Just the Two of Us" performed by Grover Washington, Jr. & Bill Withers

=== Rock ===
- Best Rock Vocal Performance, Female
  - Pat Benatar for "Fire and Ice"
- Best Rock Vocal Performance, Male
  - Rick Springfield for "Jessie's Girl"
- Best Rock Performance by a Duo or Group with Vocal
  - The Police for "Don't Stand So Close To Me"
- Best Rock Instrumental Performance
  - The Police for "Behind My Camel"

=== Spoken ===
- Best Spoken Word, Documentary or Drama Recording
  - Orson Welles for Donovan's Brain
