= Grammy Award for Producer of the Year =

There are two Grammy Awards given to Producers of the Year:

- Grammy Award for Producer of the Year, Non-Classical
- Grammy Award for Producer of the Year, Classical
