= Elaine Martone =

American record producer

Elaine L. Martone is an American record producer. She has recorded albums with several major American symphony orchestras, classical musicians, and jazz musicians, and won seven Grammy Awards, including three for Producer of the Year.

== Early life and education ==
Martone was born in Rochester, New York, and raised on Long Island. She studied oboe performance at Ithaca College, earning a Bachelor of Music in 1979.

== Career ==
Martone began her production career at Telarc Records in 1980, preparing classical and jazz recordings for release. She eventually became executive vice president of production, a role that lasted until 2009, when the company's new owners laid her off, along with dozens of colleagues. Since then, she has produced records and music festivals independently through the label Sonarc. Her clients have included Third Coast Percussion, the Atlanta Symphony Orchestra, jazz pianist Dave Brubeck and bassist Ray Brown.

From 2012 to 2019, she produced the Ojai Music Festival. Beginning in 2011, she produced the Spring for Music Festival, a series based at Carnegie Hall that centered innovation.

Martone has frequently produced records for the Cleveland Orchestra, for which she has been recognized with several Grammy Awards and nominations. During the COVID-19 pandemic, she produced the orchestra's virtual season. In 2005, she won the Grammy Award for Best Jazz Instrumental Album for the McCoy Tyner album Illuminations. In 2006, she won the Latin Grammy Award for Best Classical Album for the Barcelona Symphony Orchestra's recording of Rhapsody in Blue.

== Awards and nominations ==
Award	Year	Recipient(s) and nominee(s)	Category	Result
Grammy Awards	1992	The Music Man	Best Show Album	Nominated
Grammy Awards	2005	Berlioz: Requiem	Best Choral Performance	Won
Grammy Awards	2005	Illuminations	Best Jazz Instrumental Album	Won
Grammy Awards	2005	Higdon: City Scape; Concerto for Orchestra	Best Classical Album	Nominated
Grammy Awards	2007	Herself	Producer of the Year, Classical	Won
Grammy Awards	2008	Vaughan Williams: Symphony No. 5; Fantasia On A Theme By Thomas Tallis; Serenade To Music	Best Surround Sound Album	Nominated
Grammy Awards	2010	Transmigration	Best Surround Sound Album	Won
Grammy Awards	2015	Herself	Producer of the Year, Classical	Nominated
Grammy Awards	2015	Mahler: Symphony No. 2 'Resurrection'	Best Surround Sound Album	Nominated
Grammy Awards	2020	American Originals 1918	Best Classical Compendium	Nominated
Grammy Awards	2021	Herself	Producer of the Year, Classical	Nominated
Grammy Awards	2022	Herself	Producer of the Year, Classical	Nominated
Grammy Awards	2023	Herself	Producer of the Year, Classical	Nominated
Grammy Awards	2024	Herself	Producer of the Year, Classical	Won
Grammy Awards	2025	Herself	Producer of the Year, Classical	Won
Grammy Awards	2026	Herself	Producer of the Year, Classical	Won
Latin Grammy Awards	2006	Rhapsody in Blue	Best Classical Album	Won

== Personal life ==
Martone lives in Shaker Heights, Ohio. She is married to the producer Robert Woods, whom she met at Telarc, which he co-founded. She is a recreational ballroom dancer.
