= Judith Sherman =

American audio engineer, and record producer

- Born: November 12, 1942 (age 83); Cleveland, Ohio
- Origin: United States
- Genres: Classical
- Occupations: Engineer, producer
- Years active: 1971–present

Judith Dorothy Sherman (born November 12, 1942) is an American audio engineer, and record producer. She has been nominated for 18 Grammy Awards and won 14 including for Producer Of The Year, Classical seven times (in 1993, 2007, 2011, 2014, 2015, 2022, and 2023). She has worked with contemporary composers on recordings including Steve Reich, Elliot Carter, John Adams, John Corigliano, Terry Riley, and Philip Glass. Notable artists she has worked with include the Alexander String Quartet, Kronos Quartet (Nuevo), Pacifica Quartet, Cincinnati Pops Orchestra, London Symphony Orchestra, and the Cleveland Quartet.

== Early life and career ==
Sherman was born in Cleveland, Ohio in 1942 to LaVerne Luekens Smith and William Paul Luekens. She attended Valparaiso University where she graduated with a Bachelor's Degree in 1964. She received a Master of Fine Arts from State University of New York (Buffalo) in 1971. After graduating, Sherman worked for Edd Kalehoff (professionally known as "Edward at the Moog") in 1971-1972 in New York City. She went on to work for WBAI in New York, where she started as an engineer and worked her way up to producer and music director. Sherman also had an interest in literature. Together with Charles Ruas, WBAI's Drama and Literature Director, she produced a program on E.L. Doctorow’s Ragtime, and for then-major writer, Donald Barthelme, programs on each of his works up to 1975. In 1976, she started Judith Sherman Productions, where she has worked since as a freelance recording engineer and producer.

Sherman was the summer recording engineer for the Marlboro Music Festival in Vermont from 1976 to 1994. She was audio faculty at the Banff Centre in 2006 and 2008. She has served on the board of directors for Chamber Music America.

== Personal life ==
Sherman was married to Grammy-winning record producer Max Wilcox. The marriage ended in divorce. She is married to violinist Curtis Macomber.

After the death of her mother, Sherman commissioned composer George Perle to write a piece in her mother's memory. Triptych for Violin & Piano premiered January 27, 2003 in New York City.

== Awards ==
She was awarded the Richard J. Bogomolny National Service Award (by Chamber Music America) in 2009.
