= Joanna Nickrenz =

- Born: Joanna Dale Volz; May 25, 1936; Seattle, Washington
- Origin: United States
- Died: 9 February 2002 (aged 65)
- Genres: Classical
- Occupations: Engineer, producer

Joanna Nickrenz was an American record producer. She won four Grammy Awards, and received nine Grammy nominations over the course of her career, including two wins and five nominations for Classical Producer of the Year.

== Early life ==
Nickrenz was born in Seattle to Herbert C. and Mary Volz and had four older siblings (two brothers and two sisters). A year after her birth, her family moved to Bremerton, Washington, where they had lived previously. Her father worked at the naval shipyard.

Nickrenz learned piano on an upright piano given to the family. She graduated from Bremerton High School in 1953 and went on to study piano at University of Washington. According to her daughter, Erika, Nickrenz moved to New York City "to seek her fame and fortune on the piano."

As a performer, Nickrenz was a member of the Pittsburgh Symphony Orchestra and performed with the New Chamber Quintet and the Claremont String Quartet. The Claremont String Quartet hired her to record an Arnold Schoenberg piece, "Ode to Napoleon," which led to her interest in recording.

== Elite Recordings ==
Nickrenz was hired as an assistant at Elite Recordings, owned by Marc Aubort. Elite was started in 1965. She worked as an engineer, producer, and editor, and went on to become a full partner in the company. Aubort said of Nickrenz, "Her ears were legendary; she was nicknamed 'Ms. Razorears.'"

Aubort and Nickrenz worked together for 32 years, doing about 20 projects a year. They did a series of recordings with American orchestras in the 1960s and 1970s for Vox Records. Another notable series of recordings was for Nonesuch Records with Joan Morris and William Bolcom. They worked with 45 composers, including Leonard Slatkin.

While their counterparts in the 1960s and 1970s were doing multi-microphone/multi-tracked recordings, the pair decided to continue with a more simple and natural approach using fewer microphones. Their approach was sometimes more difficult and time consuming but the results were recognized for their natural sound quality.

Her final recording session was in October 2001 with clarinetist Giora Feidman.

== Personal life ==
Joanna Nickrenz died of lung cancer on February 9th, 2002. She was a lifelong smoker. She was remembered by Stereophile as "one of the most respected American producers of classical recordings."

Nickrenz was married to Scott Nickrenz, a violist who she played with in the New Chamber Quintet. He was a founding member of the Lenox, Claremont and Vermeer String Quartets. He also was a founding member of the Orpheus Trio and directed chamber music for the New World Symphony.

Their daughter, Erika Nickrenz, is a pianist who started playing at age six. She made her debut at New York's Town Hall at age 11. Erika Nickrenz received a Bachelor and Master of Music from the Juilliard School and is a member of the Eroica Trio. Joanna Nickrenz produced five of the Eroica Trio's albums.
