= Adam Abeshouse =

American music producer (1961–2024)

- Born: June 5, 1961; Westbury, New York, US
- Died: October 10, 2024 (aged 63) South Salem, New York, US
- Genre: Classical
- Occupations: Recording engineer; producer
- Instrument: Violin
- Spouse: Maria Janetti (m. 1986)

Adam Abeshouse (June 5, 1961 – October 10, 2024) was an American recording engineer, music producer, and classical violinist trained at the Manhattan School of Music. He won three Grammy Awards and was nominated twice more. He was also nominated for two Latin Grammy Awards. Abeshouse also founded the Classical Recording Foundation in 2002.

== Biography ==
Abeshouse was born to a Jewish family in Westbury, New York, on June 5, 1961. His grandfather was a balalaika player in Russia. He attended The Wheatley School before going on to New York University, where he majored in jazz, and the Manhattan School of Music. In 1986, Abeshouse married Maria Janetti, and they had two children.

Abeshouse was a professional violinist in the 1980s before becoming a producer in the following decade. He won three Grammy Awards, in 2000, 2008, and 2023.

In the spring of 2024, Abeshouse was diagnosed with metastatic bile duct cancer, and by August 2024, his condition was terminal. On September 27, several of the musicians whose recordings he had produced came to his studio at his home in South Salem, New York, to perform a "farewell concert" for him. He died at home less than two weeks later, on October 10, at the age of 63. He was buried at Mount Eden Cemetery in Hawthorne, New York.

== Awards and honors ==
Awards for Abeshouse's work
Year	Work	Performer(s)	Award	Result	Ref.
2000			Grammy Award for Producer of the Year, Classical	Won	
2004			Grammy Award for Producer of the Year, Classical	Nominated	
2008	Beethoven Sonatas, Vol. 3	Garrick Ohlsson	Grammy Award for Best Instrumental Soloist Performance (without orchestra)	Won	
2017	Horacio Gutiérrez Plays Chopin & Schumann	Horacio Gutiérrez	Latin Grammy Award for Best Classical Album	Nominated	
2022	Villa-Lobos: Complete Violin Sonatas	Emmanuele Baldini, Pablo Rossi, and Heitor Villa-Lobos	Latin Grammy Award for Best Classical Album	Nominated	
2023	Letters for the Future	Time for Three	Grammy Award for Best Classical Instrumental Solo	Won	
