= Steven Epstein (music producer) =

American record producer

- Origin: United States
- Genres: Classical
- Occupations: Engineer, producer
- Years active: 1973–present

Steven Epstein is an American record producer. The winner of 16 Grammy Awards and 2 Latin Grammys, he has been nominated 35 times. He has won the Grammy for Classical Producer of the Year 7 times. While primarily known for his work in classical music, Epstein also has Grammy nominations and wins for albums in musical theater, musical show, crossover, soundtrack, and spoken word for children.

He has worked with Yo-Yo Ma, Wynton Marsalis (classical and jazz), Plácido Domingo, Isaac Stern, Itzhak Perlman, Murray Perahia, Emanuel Ax, Bobby McFerrin, Juilliard String Quartet, Tokyo String Quartet, Fine Arts Quartet, and Punch Brothers. He has worked with the Vienna, Berlin and New York Philharmonic Orchestras, and with the Chicago, Cleveland, London, Concertgebouw, Philadelphia, Pittsburgh, and Los Angeles Symphony Orchestras.

== Early years ==
Epstein grew up in Queens Village, New York, and had an interest in classical music from a young age. He studied the credits of albums he listened to and imagined being in the concert hall. Thomas Frost, the record producer, was a name that came up often in his collection.

In the early to mid-1960s, he was building short-wave radios (from Heathkit catalogs). He attended Martin Van Buren High School where Epstein played violin. He also performed with the New York All-City High School Orchestra. He corresponded with Frost, which lead to an invitation to meet. Frost advised Epstein to major in music and minor in communications because there were no programs in recording technology at the time.

Epstein attended Hofstra University from 1969 where he played with the college's orchestra and worked at the radio station, WVHC-FM, all four years (as classical music director and engineer). He used school microphones and sought out chamber groups to record. His senior year, Epstein purchased a Revox 77 tape recorder for $600. His goal was to ask Frost for a job once he graduated.

Epstein graduated in 1973 with a degree in Music Education.

== Career ==
Epstein got an interview with Tom Frost and Tom Shepherd at Columbia Records and was later called back for a second interview. He knew there was one job, two applicants, and the other applicant was more qualified. Both of them were hired in September 1973. Epstein started as music editor for Columbia Masterworks and eventually became senior executive producer at the label. Epstein worked as an employee for 33 years with Columbia, then Sony/BMG/Masterworks. He was senior executive producer of Sony Classical. Epstein worked with engineer Buddy Graham until Graham's retirement (in 1991) and has done many recordings with engineer Richard King. As of 2006, he is a freelance producer.

Labels he recorded for include CBS Records Masterworks, Sony Classical, RCA Red Seal, Nonesuch, Deutsche Grommophon, Columbia Records, Naxos, Master Performers, and PS Classics.

He has been an adjunct professor of the Sound Recording Program at McGill University in Montreal since 1996. He teaches Classical Music Recording.
