= Max Wilcox =

American record producer

Max Wilcox (December 27, 1928 - January 20, 2017) was an American producer of classical music records, known for his relationship with pianist Arthur Rubinstein.

== Early life ==
Born on in Kalamazoo, Michigan, the son of a businessman and a housewife, Wilkox earned a Bachelor of Music degree at Western Michigan University, then an M.A. in music at Columbia University, as he took piano lessons with Edward Steuermann.

== The Rubinstein years ==
Wilcox joined RCA Red Seal Records in 1958, as a music editor. In 1959, he started to work as producer for Arthur Rubinstein, a relationship that lasted until Rubinsteins's retirement in 1976. Their recordings include Sonatas, Piano Concerto No. 1 (1961), Waltzes, Polonaises, Impromptus (1964), Mazurkas (1965/66), Nocturnes (1965/67) by Frédéric Chopin and the five piano concertos by Ludwig van Beethoven with Daniel Barenboim and the London Philharmonic Orchestra (1976), which won the Grammy Award for Best Instrumental Soloist(s) Performance (with orchestra) in 1977.

== Grammys ==
His recordings have won 4 Grammy Awards and 12 nominations.

== Work with other artists ==
He also worked for the Guarneri Quartet, the Emerson String Quartet, Zubin Mehta with the New York Philharmonic, Eugene Ormandy with the Philadelphia Orchestra, Charles Munch with the Boston Symphony Orchestra, pianists Richard Goode, Van Cliburn, Vladimir Feltsman, Sviatoslav Richter, Gary Graffman, Menahem Pressler, Peter Serkin, Gabriela Imreh, and even crossed roads with rock singer David Bowie in David Bowie Narrates Prokofiev's Peter and the Wolf.
