= Andrew Kazdin =

Andrew Kazdin (October 10, 1934 – November 28, 2011) was an American classical records producer who oversaw recordings with such musicians as Glenn Gould, E. Power Biggs, Murray Perahia, and Ruth Laredo (and the New York Philharmonic).

Kazdin pioneered the use in classical orchestral recordings of numerous channels, which were then mixed in the studio - a controversial practice, as critics claimed it usurped the conductor's role as shaper of the orchestral sound.
