= David Frost (producer) =

American classical record producer and pianist

David Frost is an American classical record producer and pianist. He has won 25 Grammy Awards for his work including seven wins for Producer of the Year, Classical. He is a music producer for the Metropolitan Opera and has recorded major orchestras including the New York Philharmonic, Chicago Symphony Orchestra, and Los Angeles Philharmonic.

== Early years ==
Frost is the son of Grammy Award-winning record producer Thomas Frost. Frost has a bachelor's and master's degree from the Juilliard School of Music. He is an accomplished pianist, and has performed at Carnegie Hall. He has been a record producer since his late 20s.

== Artists and Labels ==
He has worked with numerous labels, including RCA Red Seal, Sony Classical, London/Decca, Deutsche Grammophon and EMI Classics. As a staff producer at BMG Classics (RCA Red Seal) for nearly a decade, he collaborated with many of their most important artists such as André Previn, Sir Colin Davis, Leonard Slatkin, Anne Akiko Meyers, The Tokyo String Quartet, János Starker, Luciano Berio and the pianists Alicia de Larrocha, Evgeny Kissin, Rudolf Firkusny and Van Cliburn. He has also been a guest faculty member of The Banff Centre. He is the son of Thomas Frost, who won the 1986 Grammy for Classical Producer of the Year.

Frost was producer for the Grammy Award-winning Verismo and Grammy-nominated Homage with soprano Renée Fleming, Kathleen Battle's Sony Classical release Grace, and Decca's Star Crossed Lovers with Renée Fleming, Plácido Domingo and Daniel Barenboim. He has produced operatic tracks for several film soundtracks, including A Midsummer Night's Dream with soprano Renée Fleming, and The Man Who Cried with tenor Salvatore Licitra. He has collaborated with director Baz Luhrmann, producing the Broadway Cast Album of Puccini's La Boheme for DreamWorks Records.

He recently has produced recordings with the Chicago Symphony and conductors Riccardo Muti and Pierre Boulez, the Los Angeles Philharmonic and Gustavo Dudamel, pianist Jonathan Biss and the Orpheus Chamber Orchestra, Anne Akiko Meyers, the Eroica Trio, guitarist Sharon Isbin, violinist and composer Mark O'Connor, the Kansas City Symphony, and The Five Browns. Serving as audio producer for PBS Great Performances, he has collaborated with Andrea Bocelli, Tony Bennett, Celine Dion, Chris Botti, Audra MacDonald, Yo-Yo Ma, Gil Shaham, Emanuel Ax, and conductor Alan Gilbert leading the New York Philharmonic, as well as Itzhak Perlman and the Lyric Opera of Chicago. He is a Music Producer for the Metropolitan Opera and his work includes the Decca DVD release of Der Rosenkavalier with Renée Fleming and the Sony DVD release of Otello with Sonya Yoncheva.

== Awards ==
- 2024 Grammy Award for Best Opera Recording for Blanchard: Champion
- 2024 Grammy Award for Best Engineered Album, Classical for Contemporary American Composers
- 2024 Grammy Award for Best Instrumental Solo, for The American Project
- 2023 Grammy Award for Best Opera Recording for Blanchard: Fire Shut Up in my Bones
- 2023 Grammy Award for Best Classical Vocal Performance for Renée Fleming's "Voice of Nature"
- 2022 Grammy Award for Best Opera Recording for Glass: Akhnaten
- 2021 Grammy Award for Best Opera Recording for Gershwin: Porgy and Bess
- 2021 Grammy Award for Best Engineered Album, Classical for Shostakovich: Symphony No. 13 in B-Flat minor, Op. 113 (Babi Yar)
- 2021 Grammy Award for Producer of the Year, Classical
- 2018 Grammy Award for Producer of the Year, Classical
- 2017 Grammy Award for Producer of the Year, Classical
- 2014 Grammy Award for Best Classical Vocal Performance for Dawn Upshaw Winter Morning Walks
- 2014 Grammy Award for Producer of the Year, Classical
- 2014 Grammy Award for Best Engineered Album, Classical for Winter Morning Walks
- 2012 Grammy Award for Best Classical Small Ensemble Performance for "Lonely Motel"
- 2011 Grammy Award for Producer of the Year, Classical
- 2011 Grammy Award for Best Classical Album for
- 2011 Grammy Award for Best Surround Sound Album for Britten's Orchestra
- 2011 Grammy Award for Best Choral Performance for Verdi: Requiem
- 2010 Grammy Award for Best Classical Vocal Performance for Renée Fleming's "Verismo"
- 2010 Grammy Award for Best Classical Instrumental Solo without Orchestra for Sharon Isbin's "Journey to the New World"
- 2009 Grammy Award for Classical Producer of the Year
- 2009 Grammy Award for Best Engineered Album, Classical for Traditions and Transformations: Sounds of Silk Road Chicago
- 2005 Grammy Award for Classical Producer of the Year for 5 CDs produced for the Milken Archive of Jewish Music (formerly Milken Archive of American Jewish Music)
- 2000 Grammy Award for Best Spoken Word Album for Children for Listen to the Storyteller, which he co-produced with Steven Epstein

In 2014 he won three Grammy awards for Producer of the Year, Classical, Best Engineered Album, Classical for Maria Schneider's Winter Morning Walks and for Best Classical Vocal Performance for Dawn Upshaw in "Winter Morning Walks". In 2012 his production of Steven Mackey's Lonely Motel with eighth blackbird and Rinde Eckert won a Grammy Award for Best Small Ensemble Performance. In 2011 he won four awards including Producer of the Year, Classical. He had won this category in 2005 and 2009 as well. In 2009 he also won a Grammy Award for Best Engineered Album, Classical, for Traditions and Transformations: Sounds of Silk Road Chicago, with Yo-Yo Ma, the Silk Road Ensemble and the Chicago Symphony. He was the producer for Alicia de Larocha's RCA recording of Granados' Goyescas, which won both a Grammy and the Grand Prix du Disque.
