= Thomas Frost (producer) =

American music producer (1925–2026)

- Born: March 7, 1925; Vienna, Austria
- Died: April 10, 2026 (aged 101)
- Genres: Classical
- Occupation: Record producer
- Years active: 1952–1999

Thomas Frost (March 7, 1925 – April 10, 2026) was an Austrian-born American multiple Grammy Award-winning classical music producer, who won many of his awards for producing the albums of Vladimir Horowitz. Frost was the father of producer David Frost.

== Life and career ==
Thomas Frost was born in Vienna, Austria, on March 7, 1925, and was a member of the Vienna Boys' Choir in his youth. In 1938 he and his family emigrated to America to escape the Nazis. He studied at the University of Chattanooga, and then at the Yale School of Music, where one of his teachers was Paul Hindemith.

He worked as a producer for American Decca from 1952 to 1957, during which time his work included producing classical guitarist Andrés Segovia, which Frost described as "torture" due to Segovia's anxieties about getting the recordings exactly right. While at Decca he produced LPs for Segovia, Igor Markevitch, Alicia de Larrocha, Barbara Cook, and Ruth Slenczynska.

In 1959 he joined Columbia Records as a producer, becoming Director of Artists and Repertory from 1974 until 1978. While there the artists he worked with included Kathleen Battle, Montserrat Caballé, Pablo Casals, Plácido Domingo, Glenn Gould, Eugene Ormandy, Rudolf Serkin, Isaac Stern and George Szell. He signed Murray Perahia and Yo-Yo Ma to exclusive contracts, and later worked with Hilary Hahn and Arcadi Volodos. He returned to the company – by then called Sony Classical – as a senior executive producer in 1989. Frost's recordings with Horowitz were issued on Columbia, Deutsche Grammophon, and Sony.

Frost was married twice. He died on April 10, 2026, at the age of 101.

== Awards ==
His Grammy wins included:

- 1966, Best Classical Album for Horowitz at Carnegie Hall - An Historic Return.
- 1972, Best Classical Album for Horowitz Plays Rachmaninoff (Etudes-Tableaux Piano Music; Sonatas), with Richard Killough.
- 1978, Best Classical Album for Concert of the Century, with Leonard Bernstein (conductor), Dietrich Fischer-Dieskau, Vladimir Horowitz, Yehudi Menuhin, Mstislav Rostropovich, Isaac Stern, Lyndon Woodside and the New York Philharmonic.
- 1987, Best Classical Album for Horowitz - The Studio Recordings, New York 1985.
- 1988, Best Classical Album for Horowitz in Moscow, as well as an award Classical Producer of the Year.
- 2003 award for Best Instrumental Soloist(s) Performance (with orchestra) for Brahms/Stravinsky: Violin Concertos, with Richard King (engineer), Neville Marriner (conductor), Hilary Hahn and the Academy of St Martin in the Fields.
