= James Mallinson =

British record producer (1943–2018)

James Mallinson (1943 – 24 August 2018) was a British record producer. He was the first winner of the Grammy Award for Producer of the Year, Classical category, and won a total of 16 Grammy Awards in his career.

He won his first three Grammy awards in 1980 for the recording of Brahms's four symphonies with Sir Georg Solti leading the Chicago Symphony Orchestra (Best Classical Album and Best Classical Orchestral Recording), along with the first Classical Producer of the Year award. He won another four Grammy awards in 1982. He spent twelve years with the Decca Record Company and became a freelance classical producer in 1984. He worked with all the major record labels and with most leading classical artists. In 2000 he was closely involved in the creation of LSO Live, the London Symphony Orchestra's in house record label and has produced all their releases to date — currently 65 CDs.

By 2001, he was noted to have "won more Grammys than any other classical record producer except for Thomas Z. Shepard", with whom he was tied. His last recent venture was a record label for the Mariinsky Theatre and their music director Valery Gergiev in St Petersburg. The first projects on the Mariinsky label were released in 2009 and were nominated for the 2010 Grammys.

Mallinson also was instrumental in the launch of CSO Resound, the Chicago Symphony Orchestra's label in 2007. For the label, he produced several recordings conducted by Bernard Haitink, including a Grammy Award-winning release of Shostakovich's Fourth Symphony.

He died suddenly on 24 August 2018, following a brief illness.
