= Robert Woods (producer) =

American music producer

Robert Woods, born July 8, 1947, is a classical music producer. Woods is a founder and former president of the independent record label Telarc International Corporation.

Woods has won 13 Grammy Awards, with seven as solo awards for Producer of the Year, Classical and six as producer in collaboration with others including two each for Best Classical Album and Best Orchestral Performance, as well as a Best Surround Sound Album and Best Classical Crossover Album.

== See also ==
- Grammy Award for Producer of the Year, Classical
