= Grammy Award for Best Engineered Album, Classical =

Award

- Awarded for: quality classical music engineering
- Country: United States
- Presented by: National Academy of Recording Arts and Sciences
- First award: 1959
- Currently held by: Mike Tierney, Alan Silverman; Cerrone: Don't Look Down (2026)
- Website: grammy.com

The Grammy Award for Best Engineered Recording, Classical has been awarded since 1959. The award had several minor name changes:

- In 1959 the award was known as Best Engineered Record (Classical)
- From 1960 to 1962 it was awarded as Best Engineering Contribution - Classical Recording
- From 1963 to 1964 it was awarded as Best Engineered Recording - Classical
- In 1965 it was awarded as Best Engineered Recording
- From 1966 to 1994 it returned to the title Best Engineered Recording, Classical
- From 1966 to 1994 it was awarded as Best Classical Engineered Recording
- Since 1992 it has been awarded as Best Engineered Album, Classical

This award is presented alongside the Grammy Award for Best Engineered Album, Non-Classical. From 1960 to 1965 a further award was presented for Best Engineered Recording - Special or Novel Effects.

Years reflect the year in which the Grammy Awards were presented, for works released in the previous year.

The award is presented to engineers (and, if applicable, mastering engineers), not to artists, orchestras, conductors or other performers on the winning works, except if the engineer is also a credited performer.

== Winners and nominees ==
Year	Recipients(s)	Work	Performing artist(s)	Nominees Performers are in parentheses	Ref.
1959	Sherwood Hall III (engineer)	Duets with Spanish Guitar	Laurindo Almeida & Salli Terri	A N, engineer – Stravinsky - Rite of Spring (Leonard Bernstein); A N, engineer – Song of the Nightingale (Fritz Reiner); Sherwood Hall III – Gaîté Parisienne (Felix Slatkin)	
1960	Lewis W. Layton (engineer)	Victory at Sea, Vol. I	Robert Russell Bennett	Lewis W. Layton, engineer – Tchaikovsky: Capriccio Italien; Rimsky-Korsakov: Capriccio Espagnol (Kiril Kondrashin); Lewis W. Layton, engineer – Tchaikovsky: 1812 Overture; Ravel: Boléro (Morton Gould); Lewis W. Layton, engineer – Rossini Overtures (Fritz Reiner); Lewis W. Layton, engineer – Doubling in Brass (Morton Gould)	
1961	Hugh Davies (engineer)	The Spanish Guitars of Laurindo Almeida	Laurindo Almeida	John Kraus, engineer – The Two Pianos of Leonard Pennario (Leonard Pennario); Lewis W. Layton, engineer – R. Strauss: Don Quixote (Fritz Reiner); Lewis W. Layton, engineer – Puccini: Turandot (Erich Leinsdorf); Lewis W. Layton, engineer – Berlioz: Requiem (Charles Munch); Lewis W. Layton, engineer – Bartók: Music for Strings, Percussion and Celesta (Fritz Reiner); Lewis W. Layton, engineer – Alexander Nevsky (Fritz Reiner)	
1962	Lewis W. Layton (engineer)	Ravel: Daphnis et Chloé	Charles Münch (conductor) & the Boston Symphony Orchestra	Heinrich Keilholtz, engineer – R. Strauss: Elektra (Karl Bohm, conductor); Chris Parker, engineer – Prokofiev: Piano Concerto No. 3 (Erich Leinsdorf, conductor; John Browning, piano); Walter Ruhlmann & Paul Vavasseur, engineers – Poulenc: Concerto In G For Organ, Strings and Timpani (Georges Pretre, conductor; Maurice Durufle, organ); Robert Fine, engineer – Brahms: Symphony No. 2 (William Steinberg, conductor)	
1963	Lewis W. Layton (engineer)	Strauss: Also Sprach Zarathustra	Fritz Reiner (conductor) & the Chicago Symphony Orchestra	Robert Fine, engineer – Prokofiev: Concerto No. 3 for Piano/Rachmaninoff: Concerto No. 1 for Piano (Kyril Konrashin, conductor; Byron Janis, piano); William Britten, engineer – Mahler: Symphony No. 9 in D Minor (Bruno Walter, conductor); Fred Plaut, engineer – Mahler: Symphony No. 3 in D Minor (Leonard Bernstein, conductor); John Culshaw, engineer – Holst: The Planets (Herbert von Karajan, conductor); Robert Fine, engineer – Copland: Billy The Kid/Appalachian Spring (Antal Dorati, conductor); Fred Plaut, engineer – Columbia Records Presents Vladimir Horowitz (Vladimir Horowitz, piano)	
1964	Lewis W. Layton (engineer)	Puccini: Madama Butterfly	Erich Leinsdorf (conductor) & the RCA Italiana Opera Orchestra	Gordon Parry, engineer – Wagner: Siegfried (Georg Solti, conductor); Lewis W. Layton, engineer – Mahler: Symphony No. 1 in D ("The Titan") (Erich Leinsdorf, conductor); Lewis W. Layton, engineer – Great Scenes from Gershwin's Porgy and Bess (Skitch Henderson, conductor); Kenneth Wilkinson, engineer – Britten: War Requiem (Benjamin Britten, conductor); Fred Plaut, engineer – Bernstein Conducts Tchaikovsky ("Capriccio Italien", "1812 Overture", "Marche Slave") (Leonard Bernstein, conductor)	
1965	Douglas Larter (engineer)	Britten: The Young Person's Guide to the Orchestra	Carlo Maria Giulini (conductor) & the Philharmonia Orchestra	Fred Plaut, engineer – Vladimir Horowitz Plays Beethoven, Debussy, Chopin (Beethoven: Sonata No. 8 "Pathetique"; Debussy: Preludes; Chopin: Etudes And Scherzos 1 Thru 4) (Vladimir Horowitz, piano); Lewis W. Layton, engineer – Verdi: Falstaff (Georg Solti, conductor); Lewis W. Layton, engineer – Prokofiev: Symphony No. 5, Op. 100 (Erich Leinsdorf, conductor); Lewis W. Layton, engineer – Mahler: Symphony No. 5 in C Sharp Minor (Erich Leinsdorf, conductor); Fred Plaut, engineer – Mahler: Symphony No. 2 in C Minor ("Resurrection") (Leonard Bernstein, conductor)	
1966	Fred Plaut (engineer)	Horowitz at Carnegie Hall - An Historic Return	Vladimir Horowitz	Bernard Keville, engineer – Stravinsky: Symphony of Psalms (Robert Shaw, conductor); Anthony Salvatore, engineer – Strauss: Salome/The Egyptian Helen (Erich Leinsdorf, conductor; Leontyne Price, soprano); Anthony Salvatore, engineer – Prokofiev: Symphony No. 6 in E Flat Minor (Erich Leinsdorf, conductor); Edward (Bud) T. Graham, engineer – Ives: Symphony No. 4 (Leopold Stokowski, conductor); Bernard Keville, engineer – Gould: Spirituals For Orchestra/Copland: Dance Symphony (Morton Gould, conductor)	
1967	Anthony Salvatore (engineer)	Wagner: Lohengrin	Erich Leinsdorf (conductor), the Pro Musica Chorus & the Boston Symphony Orchestra	Ernest Oelrich, engineer – Vivaldi: Gloria in D (Robert Shaw, conductor); Bernard Keville, engineer – Varèse: Arcana (Jean Martinon, conductor); Anthony Salvatore, engineer – Mahler: Symphony No. 6 in A Minor (Erich Leinsdorf, conductor); Bernard Keville, engineer – Ives: Symphony No. 1 in D Minor (Morton Gould, conductor)	
1968	Edward (Bud) T. Graham (engineer)	The Glorious Sound of Brass	Philadelphia Brass Ensemble	Gunter Hermanns, engineer – Wagner: Tristan und Isolde (Karl Bohm, conductor); Edward (Bud) T. Graham, engineer – Rachmaninoff: Symphony No. 1 in D (Eugene Ormandy, conductor); Hellmuth Kolbe, engineer – Mahler: Symphony No. 8 in E Flat (Leonard Bernstein, conductor); Edwin Begley, engineer – Mahler: Symphony No. 3 in D Minor (Erich Leinsdorf, conductor); Gordon Parry, engineer – Mahler: Symphony No. 2 in C Minor ("Resurrection") (Georg Solti, conductor); Gordon Parry, engineer – Mahler: Das Lied Von Der Erde (Leonard Bernstein, conductor)	
1969	Gordon Parry (engineer)	Mahler: Symphony No. 9 in D	Georg Solti (conductor) & the London Symphony Orchestra	Anthony Salvatore, engineer – Verdi: Ernani (Thomas Schippers, conductor); Bernard Keville, engineer – Stravinsky: Rite of Spring (Seiji Ozawa, conductor); Michael Moran, engineer – Rachmaninoff: Concerto No. 3 in D Minor for Piano and Orchestra (Alexis Weissenberg, piano; Georges Pretre, conductor); Anthony Salvatore, engineer – Prokofiev: Romeo and Juliet (Erich Leinsdorf, conductor); Bernard Keville, engineer – Messiaen: Turangalia/Takemitsu: November Steps (Seiji Ozawa, conductor); Gordon Parry & Kenneth Wilkinson, engineers – Britten: Billy Budd (Benjamin Britten, conductor)	
1970	Wendy Carlos (Note: Wendy Carlos received the award as Walter Carlos, as the award was presented prior to her transition.)	Switched-On Bach	Wendy Carlos	Edwin Begley, engineer – Mahler: Symphony No 1 (Eugene Ormandy, conductor); Paul Goodman, engineer – Khachaturian: Symphony No. 3/Rimsky-Korsakov: Russian Easter Overture (Leopold Stokowski, conductor); Milton Cherin & Edward (Bud) T. Graham, engineers – Gabrieli: Antiphonal Music of Gabrieli (The Philadelphia, Cleveland And Chicago Brass Ensembles); Edward (Bud) T. Graham & Arthur Kendy, engineers – Boulez Conducts Debussy, Vol. 2 "Images Pour Orchestre" (Pierre Boulez, conductor); Ed Michalski & Fred Plaut, engineers – Berio: Sinfonia (Luciano Berio, conductor)	
1971	Arthur Kendy, Fred Plaut, Ray Moore (engineers)	Stravinsky: Le Sacre du Printemps	Pierre Boulez (conductor) & the Cleveland Orchestra	Wendy Carlos, engineer – The Well-Tempered Synthesizer (Note: Wendy Carlos received the nomination as Walter Carlos, as the award was presented prior to her transition.); Paul Goodman, engineer – Shostakovich: Symphony No. 6 and Age of Gold (Leopold Stokowsky, conductor); Bernard Keville, engineer – Shostakovich: Symphony No. 13 (Eugene Ormandy, conductor); James Lock & Gordon Parry, engineers – R. Strauss: Der Rosenkavalier (Georg Solti, conductor); Gunter Hermanns, engineer – Ives: Three Places in New England/Ruggles: Sun Treader (Michael Tilson Thomas, conductor); Carson C. Taylor, engineer – Brahms: Double Concerto (Concerto on A Minor for Violin and Cello) (George Szell, conductor; David Oistrakh; Mstislav Rostropovich)	
1972	Vittorio Negri (engineer)	Berlioz: Requiem	Colin Davis (conductor), the Wandsworth School Boys Choir & the London Symphony Orchestra	Paul Goodman, engineer – Tchaikovsky: 1812 Overture/Beethoven: Wellington's Victory (Eugene Ormandy, conductor); Carson Taylor, engineer – Mahler: Symphony No. 1 in D Major (Carlo Maria Giulini, conductor); Carson Taylor, engineer – Janácek: Sinfonietta (Seiji Ozawa, conductor); Gunter Hermanns, engineer – Holst: The Planets (William Steinberg, conductor); Marc Aubort, engineer – Crumb: Ancient Voices of Children (Jan De Gaetani, mezzo soprano; Michael Dash, singer; Arthur Weisberg, conductor); Gordon Parry, engineer – Beethoven: Egmont - Complete Incidental Music (George Szell, conductor)	
1973	Gordon Parry, Kenneth Wilkinson (engineers)	Mahler: Symphony No. 8 (Symphony of a Thousand)	Georg Solti (conductor) & the Chicago Symphony Orchestra	James Lock, Colin Moorfoot & Gordon Parry, engineers – Wagner: Tannhauser (Georg Solti, conductor); Paul Goodman, engineer – Gliere: Ilya Murometz (Symphony No. 3) (Eugene Ormandy, conductor); Edward (Bud) T. Graham & Ray Moore, engineers – Boulez Conducts Stravinsky (Petrushka) (Pierre Boulez, conductor); Edward (Bud) T. Graham & Ray Moore, engineers – Boulez Conducts Bartok/The Miraculous Mandarin (Complete) and Dance Suite (Pierre Boulez, conductor); Don Puluse, engineer – Bernstein: Mass (Leonard Bernstein, conductor); Hans Lauterslager, engineer – Berlioz: Benvenuto Cellini (Colin Davis, conductor)	
1974	Edward (Bud) T. Graham, Ray Moore (engineers)	Bartók: Concerto for Orchestra	Pierre Boulez (conductor) & the New York Philharmonic	Gordon Parry & Kenneth Wilkinson, engineers – Wagner: Parsifal (Georg Solti, conductor); Anthony Salvatore, engineer – Puccini: Heroines (Downes, conductor); Jack Law, Colin Moorfoot & Gordon Parry, engineers – Prokofiev: Romeo and Juliet (Lorin Maazel, conductor); Edward (Bud) T. Graham & Larry Keyes, engineers – Holst: The Planets (Leonard Bernstein, conductor); Gunter Hermanns, engineer – Bizet: Carmen (Leonard Bernstein, conductor); Hans Schweigmann, engineer – Berlioz: Symphonie Fantastique (Seiji Ozawa, conductor); Paul Goodman, engineer – Bach's Greatest Fugues (Eugene Ormandy, conductor)	
1975	Kenneth Wilkinson (engineer)	Berlioz: Symphonie Fantastique	Georg Solti (conductor) & the Chicago Symphony Orchestra	Isao Tomita, engineer – Snowflakes Are Dancing; Anthony Salvatore, engineer – Puccini: La Bohème (Georg Solti, conductor); Marc Aubort & Joanna Nickrenz, engineers – Percussion Music (New Jersey Percussion Ensemble); Robert Auger & Paul Goodman, engineers – Ives: Symphony No. 4 (José Serebrier, conductor); Milton Cherin, Ray Moore & Stanley Tonkel, engineers – Copland: Appalachian Spring (Aaron Copland, conductor); Edward (Bud) T. Graham & Ray Moore, engineers – Bernstein: Candide (Original Cast)	
1976	Edward (Bud) T. Graham, Milton Cherin, Ray Moore (engineers)	Ravel: Daphnis et Chloé (Complete Ballet)	Pierre Boulez (conductor), the Camarata Singers & the New York Philharmonic	James Lock & Kenneth Wilkinson, engineers – Stravinsky: The Rite of Spring (Georg Solti, conductor); Colin Moorfoot & Gordon Parry, engineers – Ravel: Daphnis and Chloe (Lorin Maazel, conductor); Edward (Bud) T. Graham & Ray Moore, engineers – Orff: Carmina Burana (Michael Tilson Thomas, conductor); Hans Schweigmann, engineer – Beethoven: Symphony No. 5 in C Minor (Klaus Kleiber, conductor); Kenneth Wilkinson, engineer – Beethoven: Symphonies (9) Complete (Georg Solti, conductor); Heinz Wildhagen, engineer – Bartók: Concerto for Orchestra (Rafael Kubelik, conductor)	
1977	Edward (Bud) T. Graham, Milton Cherin, Ray Moore (engineers)	Gershwin: Rhapsody in Blue	Michael Tilson Thomas (conductor), George Gershwin, & the Columbia Jazz Band	James Lock, engineer – Strauss: An Alpine Symphony (Zubin Mehta, conductor); Klaus Scheibe, engineer – Saint-Saens: Symphony No. 3 in C Minor ("Organ") (Daniel Barenboim, conductor); Jack Law, James Lock & Colin Moorfoot, engineers – Mahler: Symphony No. 2 in C Minor ("Resurrection") (Zubin Mehta, conductor); Arthur Lilley, James Lock, Michael Mailes & Colin Moorfoot, engineers – Gershwin: Porgy and Bess (Lorin Maazel, conductor; Leona Mitchell and Willard White); Milton Cherin, Edward (Bud) T. Graham & Ray Moore, engineers – Falla: Three Cornered Hat (Boulez Conducts Falla) (Pierre Boulez, conductor); Chris Parker, engineer – Britten: Four Sea Interludes and Passagaglia From (London Symphony Orchestra); Paul Goodman, engineer – Brahms: Symphony No. 1 in C Minor (James Levine, conductor); Seth Dworken, Patrick Gleeson, Neil Schwartz & Skip Shimmin, engineers – Beyond The Sun: An Electronic Portrait of Holst's "The Planets" (Patrick Gleeson)	
1978	Kenneth Wilkinson (engineer)	Ravel: Bolero	Georg Solti (conductor) & the Chicago Symphony Orchestra	Klaus Scheibe, engineer – Mahler: Symphony No. 9 in D Major (Carlo Maria Giulini, conductor); Heinz Wildhagen, engineer – Mahler: Symphony No. 2 in C Minor ("Resurrection") (Claudio Abbado, conductor); Paul Goodman & Anthony Salvatore, engineers – Gershwin: Porgy and Bess (DeMain, conductor); Dick Van Dijk & S.J.W. Witteveen, engineers – Berlioz: L'Enfance Du Christ (Colin Davis, conductor); Milton Cherin, Edward (Bud) T. Graham & Ray Moore, engineers – Bartók: The Wooden Prince (Pierre Boulez, conductor)	
1979	Arthur Kendy, Edward (Bud) T. Graham, Ray Moore (engineers)	Varèse: Ameriques/Arcana/Ionisation (Boulez Conducts Varese)	Pierre Boulez (conductor) & the New York Philharmonic	Marc Aubort, engineer – Prokofiev: Alexander Nevsky (Leonard Slatkin, conductor); Chris Parker, engineer – Messiaen: Turangalila Symphony (André Previn, conductor); Vittorio Negri, engineer – Holst: The Planets (Neville Marriner, conductor); Jack Renner, engineer – Frederick Fennell - Cleveland Symphonic Winds (Frederick Fennell, conductor); Gunter Hermanns, engineer – Bruckner: Symphony No. 5 in B Flat Major (Herbert von Karajan, conductor); Paul Goodman, engineer – Berlioz: Symphonie Fantastique (Eugene Ormandy, conductor); Gunter Hermanns, engineer – Beethoven: Symphonies (9) complete (Herbert von Karajan, conductor); Vittorio Negri, engineer – Bach: Mass in B Minor (Neville Marriner, conductor); Doug Sax & Bud Wyatt, engineers – Wagner: Ride of the Valkyries/Tristan: Prelude Act I/Gotterdammerung: Siegfried's Funeral Music/Siegfried: Forest Mumurs (Erich Leinsdorf, conductor)	
1980	Anthony Salvatore (engineer)	Sondheim: Sweeney Todd	Original Cast with Angela Lansbury & Len Cariou	Jack Renner, engineer – Stravinsky: The Firebird Suite/Borodin: Prince Igor (Robert Shaw, conductor); John Kurlander, engineer – Sibelius: Four Legends from The "Kalevala" (Eugene Ormandy, conductor); Marc Aubort & Joanna Nickrenz, engineers – Rachmaninoff: Symphonies Nos. 2 in E Minor and 3 in A Minor (Leonard Slatkin, conductor); Klaus Heimann, engineer – Prokofiev: Scythian Suite/Lt. Kije (Claudio Abbado, conductor); John Kurlander, engineer – Hindemith: Concert Music for Strings and Brass/ Symphonic Metamorphosis On Themes by Weber (Eugene Ormandy, conductor); Tom Jung, engineer – Copland: Appalachian Spring/Ives: Three Places in New England (Carl Davis, conductor); Vittorio Negri, engineer – Britten: Peter Grimes (Colin Davis, conductor); Jack Renner, engineer – Mussorgsky-Ravel: Pictures at an Exhibition (Lorin Maazel conducting the Cleveland Orchestra); Klaus Heimann, engineer – Bartók: Concertos for Piano Nos. 1 and 2 (Claudio Abbado, conductor; Maurizio Pollini, piano); Isao Tomita, engineer – The Bermuda Triangle	
1981	Karl-August Naegler (engineer)	Berg: Lulu (Complete Version)	Pierre Boulez (conductor) & the Orchestre de l'Opera de Paris	John McClure & Ed Michalski, engineers – Shostakovich: Symphony No. 5 (Leonard Bernstein, conductor); Michael Gray, engineer – Brahms: Concerto in A Minor for Violin and Cello (Bernard Haitink, conductor; Itzhak Perlman, violin, Mstislav Rostropovich, cello); Edward (Bud) T. Graham & Ray Moore, engineers – Bartók: Concerto for Violins and Orchestra (Zubin Mehta, conductor; Pinchas Zukerman, violin); Robert Norberg & Mitchell Tanenbaum, engineers – Bach: The Six Brandenburg Concertos (Gerard Schwarz, conductor); Phil Edwards, engineer – Almedia: First Concerto for Guitar and Orchestra (Elmer Ramsey, conductor; Laurindo Almeida)	
1982	Andrew Kazdin, Edward (Bud) T. Graham, Ray Moore (engineers)	Isaac Stern 60th Anniversary Celebration	Zubin Mehta (conductor), Isaac Stern, Itzhak Perlman, Pinchas Zukerman, & the New York Philharmonic	Jules Bloomenthal, Sydney Davis, Jack Renner & Jim Wolvington, engineers – Orff: Carmina Burana/Hindemith: Symphonic Metamorphosis of Themes by Weber (Robert Shaw, conductor); Paul Goodman & Michael Gray, engineers – Orff: Carmina Burana (Eduardo Mata, conductor; Richard Cooke, choir director); Jules Bloomenthal, Sydney Davis, Paul Goodman & Don Morrison, engineers – Mahler: Symphony No. 10 (Deryck Cook Final Version) (James Levine, conductor); Michael Sheady, engineer – Holst: The Planets (Simon Rattle, conductor)	
1983	Paul Goodman (engineer)	Mahler: Symphony No. 7 in E Minor (Song of the Night)	James Levine (conductor) & the Chicago Symphony Orchestra	Gunter Hermanns, engineer – Holst: The Planets (Herbert Von Karajan, conductor); Paul Goodman, engineer – Dvorák: Symphony No. 9 in E Minor (From The New World) (James Levine, conductor); Simon Eadon & James Lock, engineers – Berlioz: La Damnation de Faust (Georg Solti, conductor); Edward (Bud) T. Graham, Martin Greenblatt, John Johnson, Ray Moore & Stanley Tonkel, engineers – Bach: The Goldberg Variations (Glenn Gould, piano)	
1984	James Lock (engineer)	Mahler: Symphony No. 9 in D	Georg Solti (conductor) & the Chicago Symphony Orchestra	Klaus Scheibe, engineer – Verdi: Falstaff (Carlo Maria Giulini, conductor); Paul Goodman & William King, engineers – Leontyne Price and Marilyn Horne in Concert at The Met (James Levine, conductor; Marilyn Horne, Leontyne Price); John Dunkerley & James Lock, engineers – Haydn: The Creation (Georg Solti, conductor); Marc Aubort, engineer – Del Tredici: In Memory of a Summer Day (Child Alice, Part One) (Leonard Slatkin, conductor; Phyllis Bryn-Julson, soprano); Gunter Hermanns, engineer – R. Strauss: Metamorphosen/Death and Transfiguration (Herbert von Karajan, conductor)	
1985	Paul Goodman (engineer)	Prokofiev: Symphony No. 5 in B Flat, Op. 100	Leonard Slatkin (conductor) & the Saint Louis Symphony Orchestra	Tony Faulkner & Edward (Bud) T. Graham, engineers – Wynton Marsalis-Edita Gruberova, Handel, Purcell, Torelli, Fasch, Molter (Raymond Leppard, conductor; Wynton Marsalis, Edita Gruberova); John Dunkerley & James Lock, engineers – Mahler: Symphony No. 4 in G Major (Georg Solti, conductor); Paul Goodman, engineer – Brahms: Piano Concerto No. 1 in D Minor (James Levine, conductor); Paul Goodman, engineer – Brahms: A German Requiem (James Levine, conductor; Kathleen Battle, Hakan Hagegard)	
1986	Jack Renner (engineer)	Berlioz: Requiem	Robert Shaw (conductor) & the Atlanta Symphony Orchestra	Paul Goodman & Thomas MacCluskey, engineers – Tchaikovsky: The Nutcracker (Complete) (Leonard Slatkin, conductor); Jack Renner, engineer – Respighi: Pines of Rome/The Birds/Fountains of Rome (Louis Lane, conductor); Paul Goodman, engineer – Prokofiev: Cinderella (Leonard Slatkin, conductor); James Lock, engineer – Mahler: Symphony No. 1 in D Major (Georg Solti, conductor); Paul Goodman, engineer – Dvorák: Symphony No. 7 in D Minor (James Levine, conductor); Jack Renner, engineer – Berlioz: Les nuits d'été/Faure: Pelleas Et Melisande (Robert Shaw, conductor; Elly Ameling, soprano)	
1987	Paul Goodman (engineer)	Horowitz - The Studio Recordings, New York 1985	Vladimir Horowitz	Michael Sheady, engineer – Respighi: The Pines of Rome, The Fountains of Rome and Roman Festivals (Riccardo Muti, conductor); James Lock, engineer – Liszt: A Faust Symphony (Georg Solti, conductor); Marc Aubort, engineer – Copland: Billy The Kid and Rodeo (Complete Ballets) (Leonard Slatkin, conductor); Paul Goodman, engineer – Bernstein: Candide (John Maucer, conductor)	
1988	Jack Renner (engineer)	Fauré: Requiem/Duruflé: Requiem	Robert Shaw (conductor) & the Atlanta Symphony Orchestra	John Pellowe, engineer – Tchaikovsky: 1812 Overture/Romeo and Juliet/The Nutcracker Suite (Georg Solti, conductor); Thomas Frost, engineer – Horowitz in Moscow (Vladimir Horowitz); Jack Renner, engineer – Hindemith: When Lilacs Last in The Dooryard Bloom'D (A Requiem for Those We Love) (Robert Shaw, conductor); James Lock & John Pellowe, engineers – Beethoven: Symphony No. 9 in D Minor (Choral) (Georg Solti, conductor)	
1989	Jack Renner (engineer)	Verdi: Requiem & Operatic Choruses	Robert Shaw (conductor) & the Atlanta Symphony Orchestra	Klaus Scheibe, engineer – Mahler: Symphony No. 2 "Resurrection" (Leonard Bernstein, conductor); Simon Eadon, engineer – Bruckner: Symphony No. 7 in E (Georg Solti, conductor); Cees Heijkoop, Willem Van Leeuwen & Volker Strauss, engineers – Beethoven: The 9 Symphonies (Complete) (Bernard Haitink, conductor); Jack Renner, engineer – Beethoven: Missa Solemnis/Mozart: Great C Minor Mass (Robert Shaw, conductor)	
1990	Jack Renner (engineer)	Britten: War Requiem	Robert Shaw (conductor), the Atlanta Symphony Orchestra & the Atlanta Boy Choir	Wolfgang Mitlehner, engineer – Wagner: Die Walküre (James Levine, conductor); Helmut Burk & Karl-August Naegler, engineers – Mahler: Symphony No. 3 in D Minor (Leonard Bernstein, conductor); John Eargle, engineer – Hanson: Symphonies Nos. 1 in E. Minor "Nordic" and 2 "Romantic"; Elegy in Memory of Serge Koussevitsky (Gerard Schwarz, conductor); John Dunkerley & Stanley Goodall, engineers – Bartók: Concerto for Orchestra; Music for Strings, Percussion and Celesta (Charles Dutoit, conductor)	
1991	Jack Renner (engineer)	Rachmaninoff: Vespers	Robert Shaw (conductor) & the Robert Shaw Festival Singers	William Hoekstra & Thomas MacCluskey, engineers – Shostakovich: Symphony No. 8 (Leonard Slatkin, conductor); Karl-August Naegler, engineer – Shostakovich: Symphonies Nos. 1 and 7 (Leonard Bernstein, conductor); Edward (Bud) T. Graham, engineer – Mahler: Symphony No. 8 in E Flat (Lorin Maazel, conductor); Judith Sherman, engineer – Crumb: Black Angels (Kronos Quartet)	
1992	Gregor Zielinsky (engineer)	Bernstein: Candide	Leonard Bernstein (conductor) & the London Symphony Orchestra	Wolfgang Mitlehner, engineer – Wagner: Götterdämmerung (James Levine, conductor; Cheryl Studer, Hildegard Behrens, Reiner Goldberg, Hanna Schwarz, Bernd Weikl, Ekkehard Wlaschiha, Matti Salminen); Lawrence Rock, engineer – Corigliano: Symphony No. 1 (Daniel Barenboim, conductor); Stanley Goodall, engineer – Bartók: Music for Strings, Percussion and Celesta, Etc. (Georg Solti, conductor); William Hoekstra, engineer – Barber: Symphony No. 1, Op. 9; Piano Concerto Op. 38; Souvenirs, Op. 28 (Leonard Slatkin, conductor; John Browning, piano)	
1993	James Lock, John Pellowe, Jonathan Stokes & Philip Siney (engineers)	R. Strauss: Die Frau ohne Schatten	Georg Solti (conductor) & the Vienna Philharmonic Orchestra	Michael Bishop, engineer – Stravinsky: The Rite of Spring and Pulcinella Suite (Yoel Levi, conductor); Stanley Goodall, engineer – Orff: Carmina Burana (Herbert Blomstedt, conductor); John Eargle, engineer – Hanson: Mosaics; Piano Con. In G; Syms. Nos. 5 and 7 (Gerard Schwarz, conductor; Carole Rosenberger, piano); Mitch Heller, engineer – Barber: The Lovers; Prayers of Kierkegaard (Andrew Schenck, conductor); Keith O. Johnson, engineer – Arnold: A Sussex Overture; Beckus The Dandipratt; The Smoke; The Fair Field (Malcolm Arnold, conductor)	
1994	Rainer Maillard (engineer)	Bartók: The Wooden Prince & Cantata Profana	Pierre Boulez (conductor) & the Chicago Symphony Orchestra & Chorus	Colin Moorfoot, engineer – Tangazo-Music of Latin America (Works of Chavez, Copland, Roldan, Piazzolla, Ginastera, Etc.) (Michael Tilson Thomas, conductor); Jack Renner, engineer – Haydn: The Creation (Robert Shaw, conductor); Marcus Herzog, engineer – Debussy: Le Martyre De Saint Sebastien (Michael Tilson Thomas, conductor); Henk Jansen, engineer – Adams: The Death of Klinghoffer (Kent Nagano, conductor; James Maddalena, Thomas Hammons, Sanford Sylvan, Sheila Nadler, Stephanie Friedman)	
1995	William Hoekstra (engineer)	Copland: Music for Films (The Red Pony, Our Town, Etc.)	Leonard Slatkin (conductor) & the Saint Louis Symphony Orchestra	Mike Clements & Mike Hatch, engineers – Szymanowski: Stabat Mater; Litany to The Virgin Mary, Etc. (Simon Rattle, conductor); Jack Renner, engineer – Mozert: Cosi Fan Tutte (Charles Mackerras, conductor); Edward (Bud) T. Graham & Charles Harbutt, engineers – Debussy/Ravel/Dutilleux: Quartets (Juilliard String Quartet); William Hoekstra, engineer – Bartók: Concerto for Orchestra; The Miraculous Mandarin (Complete) (Leonard Slatkin, conductor)	
1996	Jonathan Stokes, Michael Mailes (engineers)	Bartók: Concerto for Orchestra; "Kossuth" - Symphonic Poem	Herbert Blomstedt (conductor) & the San Francisco Symphony	William Hoekstra & Lawrence Rock, engineers – The Typewriter - Leroy Anderson Favorites (Leonard Slatkin, conductor); Tony Faulkner, engineer – The Lily and The Lamb (Chant and Polyphony from Medieval England) (Anonymous 4); Tony Faulkner, engineer – Prokofiev: Alexander Nevsky (Yuri Temirkanov, conductor); William Hoekstra & Lawrence Rock, engineers – Orff: Carmina Burana (Leonard Slatkin, conductor)	
1997	Lawrence Rock, William Hoekstra (engineers)	Copland: Dance Symphony; Short Symphony; Organ Symphony	Leonard Slatkin (conductor) & the Saint Louis Symphony Orchestra	John Eargle, engineer – Tchaikovsky: 1812 Overture (with Chorus); Moscow Coronation Cantata, Etc. (Andrew Litton, conductor); Keith O. Johnson, engineer – Stravinsky: The Song of The Nightingale; The Firebird Suite, Etc. (Eiji Oue, conductor); Charles Harbutt, engineer – Bartók: The Three Piano Concertos (Yefim Bronfman, piano); Lawrence Rock, engineer – Barber: Violin Concerto; Cello Concerto, Etc. (Kyoko Takezawa, violin; Steven Isserlis, cello)	
1998	Michael J. Bishop, Jack Renner (engineers)	Copland: The Music of America (Fanfare for the Common Man; Rodeo, etc.)	Erich Kunzel (conductor) & the Cincinnati Pops Orchestra	Neil Hutchinson, Krzysztof Jarosz, James Lock & John Pellowe, engineers – Wagner: Die Meistersinger von Nürnberg (Georg Solti, conductor); Tony Faulkner, engineer – Holst: The Planets/Varèse: Arcana (Leonard Slatkin, conductor); Richard King, engineer – Herrmann: The Film Scores (Vertigo: Suite; Torn Curtain; Marnie: Suite, Etc.) (Esa-Pekka Salonen, conductor); Tony Faulkner & Jack Renner, engineers – Brahms: The Four Symphonies; Academic Festival Overture, Etc. (Charles Mackerras, conductor)	
1999	Jack Renner (engineer)	Barber: Prayers of Kierkegaard/Vaughan Williams: Dona Nobis Pacem/Bartók: Cantata Profana	Robert Shaw (conductor) & the Atlanta Symphony Orchestra & Chorus	Jack Renner, engineer – Monteverdi: Vespers of 1610 (Antiphon; Psalm 109; Magnificat, Etc.) (Martin Pearlman, conductor); Richard King, engineer – Mahler: Symphony No. 3 in D Minor (Esa-Pekka Salonen, conductor); Keith O. Johnson, engineer – Brucker: Symphony No. 9 (Stanislaw Skrowaczewski, conductor); Jobst Eberhardt & Stephan Flock, engineers – Bartók: Bluebeard's Castle (Pierre Boulez, conductor)	
2000	Markus Heiland (engineer)	Stravinsky: The Firebird; The Rite of Spring; Perséphone	Michael Tilson Thomas (conductor), the Peninsula Boys Choir, the San Francisco Girl's Chorus & the San Francisco Symphony Orchestra & Chorus	Michael Bishop & Thomas Knab, engineers – Mahler: Symphony No. 3 in D Minor (Jesús López-Cobos, conductor); Michael Bishop, engineer – Dvorák: Stabat Mater (Robert Shaw, conductor); Marc Aubort, engineer – Dvorák: Piano Trio "Dumky", Op. 90 /Shostakovich: Piano Trio No. 2, Op. 67/Rachmaninov: Vocalise (Eroica Trio); David Moulton & Curt Wittig, engineers – Crumb: Ancient Voices of Children (A Little Suite for Christmas, A. D. 1979; Three Early Songs, Etc.) (James Freeman, conductor/piano; Orchestra 2001; Barbara Ann Martin, soprano)	
2001	John M. Eargle (engineer)	Dvořák: Requiem, Op. 89; Sym. No. 9, Op. 95 "From the New World"	Zdeněk Mácal	Michael Bishop, engineer – Mahler: Symphony No. 1 "Titan" (Yoel Levi); Jack Renner, engineer – Gluck: Iphigénie en Tauride (Martin Pearlman); Keith O. Johnson, engineer – Bolero! (Works of Kabalevsky, Deems Taylor, Liszt, Etc.) (Eiji Oue); Jack Renner, engineer – Bach: Mass in B Minor (Martin Pearlman)	
2002	Richard King (engineer)	Bernstein (Arr. Brohn & Corigliano): West Side Story Suite (Lonely Town; Make Our Garden Grow, Etc.)	Joshua Bell	Ralph Couzens, engineer – Vaughan Williams: A London Symphony (Sym. No. 2, Org. 1913 Version) (Richard Hickox); Keith O. Johnson, engineer – Respighi: Belkis, Queen of Sheba-Suite; Dance of The Gnomes; The Pines of Rome (Eiji Oue); Marc J. Aubort, engineer – Haydn: The Complete String Quartets (The Angeles String Quartet); Simon Rhodes, engineer – Berlioz: Les Troyens (Sir Colin Davis)	
2003	Michael J. Bishop (engineer)	Vaughan Williams: A Sea Symphony (Sym. No. 1)	Robert Spano (conductor), Norman Mackenzie (chorus director), & the Atlanta Symphony Orchestra & Chorus	Tony Faulkner, engineer – Shostakovich: Symphony No. 11 (Mstislav Rostropovich); Keith O. Johnson, engineer – Rachmaninoff: Symphonic Dances; Vocalise, Etc. (Eiji Oue); Jack Renner, engineer – Orff: Carmina Burana (Donald Runnicles & Norman Mackenzie); John Newton, engineer – Chadwick: Orchestral Works (Thalia; Melpomene; Euterpe) (Kenneth Schermerhorn)	
2004	Richard King & Todd Whitelock (engineers)	Obrigado Brazil	Yo-Yo Ma	Phil Rowlands, engineer – Rorem: Three Symphonies (José Serebrier); Jack Renner, engineer – Rainbow Body (Robert Spano); Bill Maylone & Christopher Willis, engineers – Brahms/Joachim: Violin Concertos (Rachel Barton); Leslie Ann Jones, engineer – Bach: The Piano Transcriptions of Bartók, Lipatti & Friedman (Petronel Malan)	
2005	Jack Renner (engineer)	Higdon: City Scape; Concerto for Orchestra	Robert Spano & the Atlanta Symphony Orchestra	Wolfgang Decker & Charly Morell, engineers – Turnage-Scofield: Scorched (Hugh Wolff); Robert J. Friedrich, engineer – LAGQ's Guitar Heroes (Towner, McLaughlin, Hendrix, Metheny, Etc.) (Los Angeles Guitar Quartet); Bill Maylone & Christopher Willis, engineers – Kurka: Symphonic Works (Symphony No. 2, Op. 24; Julius Caesar; Music For Orchestra, Etc.) (Carlos Kalmar); Jean Chatauret & Jean-Martial Golaz, engineers – Glazunov: Symphony No. 5; The Seasons, Op. 67 (Complete Ballet) (José Serebrier)	
2006	Da-Hong Seetoo (engineer)	Mendelssohn: The Complete String Quartets	Emerson String Quartet	Barry Wolifson, engineer – Chesky: Area 31 (Anthony Aibel & Area 31); Roger de Schot & Erdo Groot, engineers – Bruckner: Sym. No. 7 (Yakov Kreizberg & Wiener Symphoniker); Jin Choi, Jean-Marie Geijsen & Erdo Groot, engineers – Britten, Bartok & Hartmann (Gordan Nikolic & Netherlands Chamber Orchestra); Tim Handley, engineer – Bolcom: Songs (Carole Farley & William Bolcom)	
2007	Michael J. Bishop (engineer)	Elgar: Enigma Variations; Britten: The Young Person's Guide to the Orchestra, Four Sea Interludes	Paavo Järvi & the Cincinnati Symphony Orchestra	Jack Renner, engineer – Vaughan Williams: Mass in G Min., and Other A Cappella Works (Norman Mackenzie & Atlanta Symphony Orchestra Chamber Chorus); John Newton, engineer – Requiem (Craig Hella Johnson & Conspirare); Wolf-Dieter Karwatky & Rainer Maillard, engineers – Mahler: Symphony No. 2 (Pierre Boulez, Wiener Philharmoniker, Christine Schäfer, Michelle DeYoung & Wiener Singverein); Leslie Ann Jones & Judy Kirschner, engineers – Látigo (Quartet San Francisco)	
2008	John Newton (engineer)	Grechaninov: Passion Week	Charles Bruffy, Phoenix Bach Choir & the Kansas City Chorale	Lawrence L. Rock, engineer – R. Strauss: Don Juan, Death and Transfiguration (Lorin Maazel & New York Philharmonic); Bruce Leek, Fred Vogler & Trent Walker, engineers – Spirit of the Season (Craig Jessop, Mack Wilberg & Mormon Tabernacle Choir); Arne Akselberg & Tobias Lehmann, engineers – Nielsen: Clarinet & Flute Concertos (Sabine Meyer, Emmanuel Pahud & Simon Rattle); Keith O. Johnson, engineer – Garden of Dreams (Jerry Junkin & Dallas Wind Symphony)	
2009	David Frost, Tom Lazarus & Christopher Willis, engineers	Traditions and Transformations: Sounds of Silk Road Chicago	Miguel Harth-Bedoya, Alan Gilbert, Silk Road Ensemble, Wu Man, Yo-Yo Ma & Chicago Symphony Orchestra	John Newton, engineer – Respighi: Church Windows, Brazilian Impressions, Rossiniana (JoAnn Falletta & Buffalo Philharmonic Orchestra); Michael J. Bishop, engineer – Puccini: La Bohème (Robert Spano & Atlanta Symphony Orchestra & Chorus); Hans Peter L'Orange & Morten Lindberg, engineers – Divertimenti (Øyvind Gimse & TrondheimSolistene); Fred Vogler, engineer – Berlioz: Symphonie Fantastique (Gustavo Dudamel & Los Angeles Philharmonic)	
2010	Peter Laenger (engineer)	Mahler: Symphony No. 8; Adagio From Symphony No. 10	Michael Tilson Thomas & the San Francisco Symphony	John Newton & Dirk Sobotka, engineers – Shostakovich: Symphonies Nos. 1 & 15 (Valery Gergiev & Orchestra of The Mariinsky Theatre); Jesse Lewis & John Newton, engineers – Ravel: Daphnis Et Chloé(James Levine, Tanglewood Festival Chorus & Boston Symphony Orchestra); Judy Kirschner, engineer – QSF Plays Brubeck (Quartet San Francisco); Neil Hutchinson & Jonathan Stokes, engineers – Britten: Billy Budd (Daniel Harding, Nathan Gunn, Ian Bostridge, Gidon Saks, Neal Davies, Jonathan Lemalu, Matthew Rose, London Symphony Chorus & London Symphony Orchestra)	
2011	TIE: Mark Donahue, John Hill & Dirk Sobotka (engineers); Leslie Ann Jones, Kory Kruckenberg, Brandie Lane & David Sabee (engineers)	Daugherty: Metropolis Symphony; Deus Ex Machina; Porter, Quincy: Complete Viola Works	Giancarlo Guerrero & Nashville Symphony Orchestra; Eliesha Nelson & John McLaughlin Williams	Steven D. Miller, Allen M. Sides & Roger Treece, engineers – Vocabularies (Bobby McFerrin); Leslie Ann Jones, Kory Kruckenberg, Brandie Lane & David Sabee, engineers – Porter, Quincy: Complete Viola Works (Eliesha Nelson & John McLaughlin Williams); Mark Donahue, David Frost, Tom Lazarus, Steven Mackey & Dirk Sobotka, engineers – Mackey, Steven: Dreamhouse (Gil Rose, Rinde Eckert, Catch Electric Guitar Quartet, Synergy Vocals & Boston Modern Orchestra Project); Robert J. Friedrich, engineer – Have You Ever Been...? (Turtle Island Quartet, Stefon Harris & Mike Marshall)	
2012	Byeong-Joon Hwang and John Newton (engineers); Jesse Lewis (master engineer)	Aldridge: Elmer Gantry	William Boggs, Keith Phares, Patricia Risley, Vale Rideout, Frank Kelley, Heather Buck, Florentine Opera Chorus & Milwaukee Symphony Orchestra	Torbjörn Samuelsson, engineer – Weinberg: Symphony No. 3 & Suite No. 4 from The Golden Key (Thord Svedlund & Gothenburg Symphony Orchestra); Arne Akselberg, engineer – Rachmaninov: Piano Concertos Nos. 3 & 4 (Leif Ove Andsnes, Antonio Pappano & London Symphony Orchestra); Tom Lazarus, Mat Lejeune, Bill Maylone & Jon Zacks (engineers); Joe Lambert (mastering engineer) – Mackey: Lonely Motel - Music from Slide (Rinde Eckert, Steven Mackey & Eighth Blackbird); Richard King, engineer – Glazunov: Complete Concertos (José Serebrier, Alexey Serov, Wen-Sinn Yang, Alexander Romanovsky, Rachel Barton Pine, Marc Chisson & Russian National Orchestra)	
2013	Tom Caulfield & John Newton (engineers); Mark Donahue (mastering engineer)	Life & Breath - Choral Works by Casper Clausen	Charles Bruffy & the Kansas City Chorale	Morten Lindberg, engineer – Souvenir (Trondheim Solistene); Jesse Lewis & John Newton (engineers); Jesse Brayman (mastering engineer) – Music for a Time of War (Carlos Kalmar and the Oregon Symphony); Bruce Egre – Beethoven: The Late String Quartets, Op. 127 & 131 (Brentano String Quartet); Daniel Shores – Americana (Modern Mandolin Quartet)	
2014	David Frost, Brian Losch & Tim Martyn (engineers); Tim Martyn (mastering engineer)	Winter Morning Walks	Dawn Upshaw, Maria Schneider, the Australian Chamber Orchestra & the St. Paul Chamber Orchestra	Hans-Martin Renz, Wolfgang Rixius and Ulrich Ruscher, engineers – Vinci: Artaserse (Diego Fasolis, Philippe Jaroussky, Max Emanuel Cenčić, Daniel Behle, Franco Fagioli, Valer Barna-Sabadus, Yuriy Mynenko & Concerto Köln); Mark Donahue & Jesse Lewis, engineers – Roomful of Teeth (Brad Wells & Roomful of Teeth); Morten Lindberg, engineer – La Voie Triomphale (Ole Kristian Ruud & the Staff Band of the Norwegian Armed Forces); Morten Lindberg – Hymn to the Virgin (Tone Bianca Sparre Dahl & Schola Cantorum)	
2015	Michael Bishop (engineer/mastering engineer)	Vaughan Williams: Dona Nobis Pacem; Symphony No. 4; The Lark Ascending	Robert Spano, Norman Mackenzie, Atlanta Symphony Orchestra & Chorus	David Frost & Christopher Willis (engineers) & Tim Martyn (mastering engineer) – Riccardo Muti Conducts Mason Bates & Anna Clyne (Chicago Symphony Orchestra & Riccardo Muti); Dmitriy Lipay (engineer) – Dutilleux: Symphony No. 1; Tout un Monde Lointain; The Shadows of Time (Ludovic Morlot & Seattle Symphony); Dmitriy Lipay (engineer) & Nathaniel Reichman (engineer/mastering engineer) – John Luther Adams: Become Ocean (Ludovic Morlot & Seattle Symphony); Richard King (engineer) & Wolfgang Schiefermair (mastering engineer) – John Adams: City Noir (St. Louis Symphony conducted by David Robertson)	
2016	Leslie Ann Jones, John Kilgore, Nora Kroll-Rosenbaum & Justin Merrill (engineers); Patricia Sullivan (mastering engineer)	Ask Your Mama	San Francisco Ballet Orchestra & George Manahan	Keith O. Johnson & Sean Royce Martin (engineers); Keith O. Johnson (mastering engineer) – Saint-Saëns: Symphony No. 3, 'Organ' (Kansas City Symphony & Michael Stern); Byeong Joon Hwang & John Newton (engineers); Mark Donahue (mastering engineer) – Rachmaninoff: All-Night Vigil (Charles Bruffy, Phoenix Chorale & Kansas City Chorale); Robert Friedrich (engineer); Michael Bishop (mastering engineer) – Monteverdi: Il Ritorno d'Ulisse in Patria (Martin Pearlman, Jennifer Rivera, Fernando Guimarães & Boston Baroque); Dmitry Lipay (engineer); Alexander Lipay (mastering engineer) – Dutilleux: Métaboles; L'Arbre Des Songes; Symphony No. 2, 'Le Double' (Seattle Sympnony, Ludovic Morlot & Augustin Hadelich	
2017	Mark Donahue, David L. Williams & Fred Vogler (engineers)	Corigliano: The Ghosts of Versailles	James Conlon, Guanqun Yu, Joshua Guerrero, Patricia Racette, Christopher Maltman, Lucy Schaufer, Lucas Meachem, LA Opera Chorus & Orchestra	Shawn Murphy & Nick Squire (engineers); Tim Martyn (mastering engineer) – Shostakovich: Under Stalin's Shadow - Symphonies Nos. 5, 8 & 9, performed by Andris Nelsons & the Boston Symphony Orchestra; Silas Brown & David Frost, engineers; Silas Brown, mastering engineer – Shadows of Sirius (Jerry F. Junkin & the University of Texas Wind Ensemble); Morten Lindberg (engineer) – Reflections (Øyvind Gimse, Geir Inge Lotsberg & the TrondheimSolistene); Alexander Lipay & Dmitriy Lipay (engineers) – Dutilleux: Sur Le Même Accord; Les Citations; Mystère de l'Instant & Timbres, Espace, Mouvement (Ludovic Morlot & the Seattle Symphony)	
2018	Mark Donahue (engineer)	Shostakovich: Symphony No. 5; Barber: Adagio	Manfred Honeck & Pittsburgh Symphony Orchestra	Keith O. Johnson & Sean Royce Martin (engineers) – Schoenberg, Adam: American Symphony; Finding Rothko; Picture Studies (Michael Stern & the Kansas City Symphony); Morten Lindberg (engineer) – Kleiberg: Mass for Modern Man (Eivind Gulliberg Jensen, Trondheim Vokalensemble & Trondheim Symphony Orchestra); John Newton (engineer) and Jesse Brayman (mastering engineer) – Tyberg: Masses (Brian A. Schmidt, Christopher Jacobson & South Dakota Chorale); Gary Call (engineer) – Danielpour: Songs of Solitude & War Songs (Thomas Hampson, Giancarlo Guerrero & the Nashville Symphony)	
2019	Shawn Murphy & Nick Squire (engineers); Tim Martyn (mastering engineer)	Shostakovich: Symphonies Nos. 4 & 11	Boston Symphony Orchestra conducted by Andris Nelsons	Mark Donahue, engineer and mastering engineer; Dirk Sobotka, engineer – Bates: The (R)evolution of Steve Jobs (Michael Christie, Garrett Sorenson, Wei Wu, Sasha Cooke, Edward Parks, Jessica E. Jones & Santa Fe Opera Orchestra); Mark Donahue, engineer and mastering engineer – Beethoven: Symphony No. 3/R. Strauss: Horn Concerto No. 1 (Pittsburgh Symphony Orchestra conducted by Manfred Honeck); Keith O. Johnson, engineer and mastering engineer; Sean Royce Martin, engineer – John Williams At The Movies (The Dallas Winds conducted by Jerry Junkin); Bill Maylone, engineer and mastering engineer; Mary Mazurek, engineer – Liquid Melancholy - Clarinet Music of James M. Stephenson (John Bruce Yeh); Tom Caulfield, engineer; Jesse Lewis, mastering engineer – Visions and Variations (A Far Cry)	
2020	Leslie Ann Jones (engineer); Robert C. Ludwig (mastering engineer)	Riley: Sun Rings	Kronos Quartet	Keith O. Johnson, engineer and mastering engineer; Sean Royce Martin, engineer – Rachmaninoff - Hermitage Piano Trio (The Hermitage Piano Trio); Daniel Shores, engineer and mastering engineer – Aequa - Anna Thorvaldsdóttir (The International Contemporary Ensemble); Mark Donahue, engineer and mastering engineer – Bruckner: Symphony No. 9 (The Pittsburgh Symphony Orchestra conducted by Manfred Honeck); Bob Hanlon, Ian Good, engineers; Lauwrence Rock, engineer and mastering engineer – Wolfe: Fire in my Mouth (the New York Philharmonic conducted by Jaap van Zweden, The Crossing conducted by Donald Nally and the Young People's Chorus of New York City conducted by Francisco Núñez)	
2021	David Frost & Charlie Post (engineers); Silas Brown (mastering engineer)	Shostakovich: Symphony No. 13, Babi Yar	Riccardo Muti & the Chicago Symphony Orchestra	David Frost & John Kerswell, engineers; Silas Brown, mastering engineer – Gershwin: Porgy and Bess (David Robertson, Eric Owens, Angel Blue, Metropolitan Opera Orchestra & Chorus); Alexander Lipay & Dmitriy Lipay, engineers/mastering engineers – Ives: Complete Symphonies (Gustavo Dudamel & the Los Angeles Philharmonic); Kyle Pyke, engineer; Jesse Lewis & Kyle Pyke, mastering engineers – Hynes: Fields (Devonté Hynes & Third Coast Percussion); Bernd Gottinger, engineer – Danielpour: The Passion of Yeshua (JoAnn Falletta, James K. Bass, Adam Luebke, UCLA Chamber Singers, Buffalo Philharmonic Orchestra & Buffalo Philharmonic Chorus	
2022	Leslie Ann Jones & Michael Rowanoski, engineer	Chanticleer Sings Christmas	Chanticleer	Jonathan Lackey, Billy Maylone & Dan Nichols, engineers; Bill Maylone, mastering engineer – Archetypes (Sérgio Assad, Clarice Assad & Third Coast Percussion); Richard King, engineer – Beethoven: Cello Sonatas - Hope Amid Tears (Yo-Yo Ma & Emanuel Ax); Mark Donahue, engineer & mastering engineer – Beethoven: Symphony No. 9 (The Mendelssohn Choir of Pittsburgh & The Pittsburgh Symphony Orchestra conducted by Manfred Honeck); Alexander Lipay & Dmitriy Lipay, engineers & mastering engineers – Mahler: Symphony No. 8, "Symphony of a Thousand" (Gustavo Dudamel, Fernando Malvar-Ruiz, Luke McEndarfer, Robert Istad & Grant Gershon (soloists), Los Angeles Children's Chorus, Los Angeles Master Chorale, The National Children's Chorus, the Pacific Chorale & Los Angeles Philharmonic)	
2023	Shawn Murphy, Charlie Post & Gary Rydstrom (engineers); Michael Rowanowski (mastering engineer)	Bates: Philharmonia Fantastique - The Making of the Orchestra	Edwin Outwater (conductor) & the Chicago Symphony Orchestra	Mark Donahue (engineer/mastering engineer) for Beethoven: Symphony No. 6 / Stucky: Silent Spring (Manfred Honeck; Pittsburgh Symphony Orchestra); Mark Alletag, Jonathan Lackey, Bill Maylone & Dan Nichols (engineers); Joe Lambert (mastering engineer) for Perspectives (Third Coast Percussion); Morten Lindberg (engineer/mastering engineer) for Tuvayhun - Beatitudes For A Wounded World (Anita Brevik; Nidarosdomens Jentekor & Trondheimsolistene); Bernhard Güttler, Shawn Murphy & Nick Squire (engineers); Christoph Stickel (mastering engineer) for Williams: Violin Concerto No. 2 & Selected Film Themes (Anne-Sophie Mutter; John Williams; Boston Symphony Orchestra)	
2024	David Frost & Charlie Post (engineers); Silas Brown (mastering engineer)	Contemporary American Composers	Riccardo Muti & the Chicago Symphony Orchestra	Patrick Dillet, Mitchell Graham, Jesse Lewis, Kyle Pyke, Andrew Scheps & John Weston (engineers); Helge Sten (mastering engineer) for The Blue Hour (Shara Nova & A Far Cry); Alexander Lipay & Dmitriy Lipay (engineers/mastering engineers) for Fandango (Gustavo Dudamel, Anne Akiko Meyers, Gustavo Castillo & Los Angeles Philharmonic); Christopher Moretti & John Weston (engineers); Shauna Barravecchio & Jesse Lewis (mastering engineers) for Sanlıkol: A Gentleman of Istanbul - Symphony for Strings, Percussion, Piano, Oud, Ney & Tenor (Mehmet Ali Sanlikol, George Lernis & A Far Cry); Mark Donahue (engineer/mastering engineer) for Tchaikovsky: Symphony No. 5 & Schulhoff: Five Pieces (Manfred Honeck & The Pittsburgh Symphony Orchestra)	
2025	Mark Donahue & John Newton (engineers); Mark Donahue (mastering engineer)	Bruckner: Symphony No. 7; Bates: Ressurexit	Manfred Honeck & Pittsburgh Symphony Orchestra	Alexander Lipay & Dmitriy Lipay (engineers and mastering engineers) for Adams: Girl of the Golden West (John Adams, Daniela Mack, Ryan McKinny, Paul Appleby, Hye Jung Lee, Elliot Madore, Julia Bullock, Davóne Tines, Los Angeles Philharmonic & Los Angeles Master Chorale); Silas Brown, Doron Schachter & Michael Schwartz (engineers); Matt Colton (mastering engineer) for Andres: The Blind Banister (Andrew Cyr, Inbal Segev & Metropolis Ensemble); Daniel Shores (engineer and mastering engineer) for Clear Voices in the Dark (Matthew Guard & Skylark Vocal Ensemble); Alexander Lipay & Dmitriy Lipay (engineers and mastering engineers) for Ortiz: Revolución Diamantina (Gustavo Dudamel, Maria Dueñas, Los Angeles Philharmonic & Los Angeles Master Chorale)	
2026	Mike Tierney (engineer); Alan Silverman (mastering engineer)	Cerrone: Don't Look Down	Sandbox Percussion	Gintas Norvila (engineer); Jennifer Nulsen (mastering engineer) for Eastman: Symphony No. 2; Tchaikovsky: Symphony No. 2 (Franz-Welser Möst & the Cleveland Orchestra); Shawn Murphy & Nick Squire (engineers); Tim Martyn (mastering engineer) for Shostakovich: Lady MacBeth of the Mtsensk District (Andris Nelsons, Kristine Opolais, Günther Groissböck, Peter Hoare, Brenden Gunnell & Boston Symphony Orchestra); Sean Connors, Robert Dillon, Peter Martin, Bill Maylone, Judith Sherman & David Skidmore, engineers; Joe Lambert, mastering engineer for Standard Stoppages (Third Coast Percussion); Morten Lindberg (engineer and mastering engineer) for Yule (Trio Mediæval)	
2027	Winner TBA on 7 February 2027			Mark Donahue (engineer and mastering engineer) for Akiho: Beneath Lighted Coffers & Concerto for Steel Pans and Orchestra (Andy Akiho, David Danzmayr & the Oregon Symphony); Mark Donahue (engineer and mastering engineer) for Dvorak: Symphony No. 9, 'From the New World'; Simon: Four Black American Dances (Pittsburgh Symphony Orchestra & Manfred Honeck); Jon Johannsen, Jason O'Connell & Mark Willsher (engineers), Mark Willsher (mastering engineer) for Mahler: Symphony No. 2 'Resurrection' (San Francisco Symphony & Esa-Pekka Salonen); Silas Brown (engineer and mastering engineer) for Puts: Emily - No Prisoner Be (Joyce Didonato & Time For Three); Silas Brown, Wellington Gordon, Charles Mueller, Doron Schachter, Ryan Streber & Mike Tierney (engineers), Silas Brown (mastering engineer) for Sarah Kirkland Snider: Forward Into Light (Metropolis Ensemble, Andrew Cyr); Gintas Norvila (engineer); Jennifer Nulsen (mastering engineer) for Ustvolskaya: Symphony No. 5 and Poulenc: La Voix Humaine (Franz Welser-Möst, The Cleveland Orchestra)	
