= Grammy Award for Best Immersive Audio Album =

Music award

- Awarded for: quality albums recorded and/or mixed in surround sound (classical and non-classical)
- Country: United States
- Presented by: National Academy of Recording Arts and Sciences
- First award: 2005
- Currently held by: Immersed by Justin Gray (2026)
- Website: http://www.grammy.com/

The Grammy Award for Best Immersive Audio Album (until 2018: Best Surround Sound Album) was first awarded in 2005, as the first category in a new "Surround Sound" field. It is currently part of the Production, Engineering, Composition & Arrangement field.

It is one of a few categories which are open to both classical and non-classical recordings, new or re-issued. To qualify for this category, the recording must be in surround quality (with a minimum of four channels). The recordings must be commercially available on either DVD-Audio, DVD-Video, Blu-ray, SACD, surround download or a streaming-only version. The award goes to the engineer, mastering engineer (if any) and producer. These used to be called Surround Engineer, Surround Mastering Engineer and Surround Sound Producer, respectively, but as of 2023 the descriptions are Immersive Mix Engineer, Immersive Mastering Engineer and Immersive Producer, respectively. Performing artists do not receive the award, except if they are also credited with one or more of the three roles mentioned above.

The category was renamed Best Immersive Audio Album for the 2019 Grammy season. According to NARAS, "driven by the technological side of music evolution, the Best Surround Sound Album category [was] renamed Best Immersive Audio Album. The same goes for the Field to which it belongs. The change reflects evolving technology, new formats, and current industry trends, practices, and language."

On November 24, 2020, during the announcement of the nominations for the 63rd Grammy Awards, to be presented on January 31, 2021, the Recording Academy said there would be no winner or nominees in this category that year. "Due to the COVID-19 pandemic, the Best Immersive Audio Album Craft Committee was unable to meet. The judging of the entries in this category has been postponed until such time that we are able to meet in a way that is appropriate to judge the many formats and configurations of the entries and is safe for the committee members. The nominations for the 63rd Grammy's will be announced next year [2021] in addition to (and separately from) the 64th Grammy nominations in the category", the Academy stated. On November 23, 2021, at the presentation of the nominations for the 64th Grammy Awards, the nominations for the previous year were finally announced. The winning recording was announced on the 64th Annual Grammy Awards ceremony.

== Winners and nominees ==
Legend:
* = Surround Mix Engineer (from 2020: Immersive Audio Engineer; from 2023: Immersive Mix Engineer)
^{†} = Surround Mastering Engineer (from 2020: Immersive Audio Mastering Engineer; from 2023: Immersive Mastering Engineer)
^{‡} = Surround Producer (from 2020: Immersive Audio Producer; from 2023: Immersive Producer)

=== 2000s ===
Year^{[I]}	Work	Recipient(s)	Artist(s)
2005
2005	Genius Loves Company	Al Schmitt*, Robert Hadley^{†}, Doug Sax^{†}, John Burk^{‡}, Phil Ramone^{‡} and Herbert Waltl^{‡}	Ray Charles and Various Artists
2005	Avalon	Bob Clearmountain*, Bob Ludwig^{†} and Rhett Davies^{‡}	Roxy Music
2005	Mahler: Symphony No. 4	Markus Heiland*^{†} and Andreas Neubronner^{‡}	Michael Tilson Thomas
2005	Nick of Time	Ed Cherney*, James Guthrie^{†} and Doug Sax^{†}	Bonnie Raitt
2005	Raise Your Spirit Higher	Martin Walters*^{‡} and Paul Blakemore^{†}	Ladysmith Black Mambazo
2006
2006	Brothers in Arms — 20th Anniversary Edition	Chuck Ainlay*, Bob Ludwig^{†}, Chuck Ainlay^{‡} and Mark Knopfler^{‡}	Dire Straits
2006	The Girl in the Other Room	Al Schmitt*^{‡} and Doug Sax^{†}	Diana Krall
2006	Honky Château	Greg Penny*^{†‡}	Elton John
2006	In Your Honor	Elliot Scheiner*, Bob Ludwig^{†} and Nick Rasculinecz^{‡}	Foo Fighters
2006	Mussorgsky/Stokowski: Pictures at an Exhibition; Boris Godunov; Night on Bare Mountain	Phil Rowlands*^{†}, Nick Parker^{‡} and Phil Rowlands^{‡}	José Serebrier
2007
2007	Morph the Cat	Elliot Scheiner*, Darcy Proper^{†} and Donald Fagen^{‡}	Donald Fagen
2007	Immortal Nystedt	Morten Lindberg*, Hans Peter l'Orange* and Morten Lindberg^{†‡}	Ensemble 96
2007	Long Walk to Freedom	Martin Walters*^{†‡}	Ladysmith Black Mambazo
2007	Straight Outta Lynwood	Tony Papa*, Bernie Grundman^{†} and Al Yankovic^{‡}	"Weird Al" Yankovic
2007	A Valid Path	P.J. Olsson*, Alan Parsons*^{‡} and Bob Michaels^{†}	Alan Parsons
2008
2008	Love	Paul Hicks*, Tim Young^{†}, George Martin^{‡} and Giles Martin^{‡}	The Beatles
2008	At War with the Mystics 5.1	The Flaming Lips*^{†‡} and Dave Fridmann*^{†‡}	The Flaming Lips
2008	Fear of a Blank Planet	Steven Wilson*, Darcy Proper^{†} and Porcupine Tree^{‡}	Porcupine Tree
2008	Grechaninov: Passion Week	John Newton*, Jonathan Cooper^{†} and Blanton Alspaugh^{‡}	Charles Bruffy
2008	Vaughan Williams: Symphony No. 5; Fantasia on a Theme of Thomas Tallis; Serenade to Music	Michael Bishop*^{†} and Elaine Martone^{‡}	Robert Spano
2009
2009	Mussorgsky: Pictures at an Exhibition; Night on Bald Mountain; Prelude to Khovanshchina	Michael Bishop*^{†} and Robert Woods^{‡}	Paavo Järvi and Cincinnati Symphony Orchestra
2009	Divertimenti	Morten Lindberg*^{†‡} and Hans Peter l'Orange*	Øyvind Gimse and TrondheimSolistene
2009	Rheinberger: Sacred Choral Works	John Newton*, Jonathan Cooper^{†}, Mark Donahue^{†} and Blanton Alspaugh^{‡}	Charles Bruffy
2009	Ringo 5.1: The Surround Sound Collection	Bruce Sugar*, Chris Bellman^{†}, Bill Crowley^{‡}, Ringo Starr^{‡} and Bruce Sugar^{‡}	Ringo Starr
2009	Sensurround + B Sides	Tohru Takayama* and Keigo Oyamada^{‡}	Cornelius

=== 2010s ===
Year^{[I]}	Work	Recipient(s)	Artist(s)
2010
2010	Transmigration	Michael Bishop*^{†} and Elaine Martone^{‡}	Robert Spano, Atlanta Symphony Orchestra and Choruses
2010	1970—1975	Nick Davis*^{‡} and Tony Cousins^{†}	Genesis
2010	Colabs	David Miles Huber*^{†‡}	David Miles Huber, Allen Hart, DJ Muad'Deep, Seren Wen, Musetta, Henta, Marcell Marias and Gail Pettis
2010	Flute Mystery	Morten Lindberg*^{†‡} and Hans Peter l'Orange*	Emily Beynon, Vladimir Ashkenazy, Fred Jonny Berg, Catherine Beynon and the Philharmonia Orchestra
2010	Kleiberg: Treble & Bass	Morten Lindberg*^{†‡} and Hans Peter l'Orange*	Daniel Reuss, Trondheim Symphony Orchestra, Marianne Thorsen and Göran Sjölin
2011
2011	Britten's Orchestra	Keith O. Johnson*^{†} and David Frost^{‡}	Michael Stern and Kansas City Symphony
2011	The Incident	Steven Wilson*^{‡} and Darcy Proper^{†}	Porcupine Tree
2011	Parallax Eden	David Miles Huber*^{†‡}	David Miles Huber
2011	Songs and Stories (Monster Music Version)	Don Murray*, Sangwook Nam^{†}, Doug Sax^{†}, John Burk^{‡}, Noel Lee^{‡} and Marcus Miller^{‡}	George Benson
2011	Trondheimsolistene — In Folk Style	Morten Lindberg*^{†‡}	Trondheimsolistene
2012
2012	Layla and Other Assorted Love Songs (Super Deluxe Edition)	Elliot Scheiner*, Bob Ludwig^{†}, Bill Levenson^{‡} and Elliot Scheiner^{‡}	Derek and the Dominos
2012	An Evening with Dave Grusin	Frank Filipetti*, Eric Schilling*, Frank Filipetti^{†} and Phil Ramone^{‡}	Various Artists
2012	Grace for Drowning	Steven Wilson*^{‡} and Paschal Byrne^{†}	Steven Wilson
2012	Kind	Morten Lindberg*^{†‡}	Kjetil Almenning, Ensemble 96 and Nidaros String Quartet
2012	Spohr: String Sextet In C Major, Op. 140 & Nonet In F Major, Op. 31	Andreas Speer*^{‡}, Robin Schmidt^{†} and Andreas Speer^{†}	Camerata Freden
2013
2013	Modern Cool	Jim Anderson*, Darcy Proper^{†} and Michael Friedman^{‡}	Patricia Barber
2013	Chamberland	David Miles Huber*^{†‡}	David Miles Huber
2013	Quiet Winter Night	Morten Lindberg*^{†‡}	The Hoff Ensemble
2013	Rupa-Khanda	Daniel Shores*^{†}, Marina Ledin^{‡} and Victor Ledin^{‡}	The Los Angeles Percussion Quartet
2013	Storm Corrosion	Steven Wilson*^{†‡}	Storm Corrosion
2014
2014	Live Kisses	Al Schmitt* and Tommy LiPuma^{‡}	Paul McCartney
2014	Sailing the Seas of Cheese (Deluxe Edition)	Les Claypool*, Jason Mills*, Stephen Marcussen^{†} and Jeff Fura^{‡}	Primus
2014	Signature Sound Opus One	Leslie Ann Jones*, Michael Romanowski^{†} and Herbert Walti^{‡}	Various Artists
2014	Sixteen Sunsets	Jim Anderson*, Darcy Proper^{†}, Jim Anderson^{‡} and Jane Ira Bloom^{‡}	Jane Ira Bloom
2014	Sprung Rhythm	Daniel Shores*^{†} and Dan Merceruio^{‡}	Richard Scerbo and Inscape
2015
2015	Beyoncé	Elliot Scheiner*, Tom Coyne^{†} and Beyoncé Knowles^{‡}	Beyoncé
2015	Beppe: Remote Galaxy	Morten Lindberg*^{†‡}	Vladimir Ashkenazy and Philharmonia Orchestra
2015	Chamberland: The Berlin Remixes	David Miles Huber*^{†‡}	David Miles Huber
2015	The Division Bell (20th Anniversary Deluxe Box Set)	Damon Iddins and Andy Jackson*^{‡}	Pink Floyd
2015	Epics of Love	Hans-Jörg Maucksch*^{‡} and Günter Pauler^{†}	Song Zuying, Yu Long and China Philharmonic Orchestra
2015	Mahler: Symphony No. 2 'Resurrection'	Michael Bishop*^{‡} and Elaine Martone^{†}	Benjamin Zander and Philharmonia Orchestra
2016
2016	Amused to Death	James Guthrie*^{†‡} and Joel Plante^{†}	Roger Waters
2016	Amdahl: Astrognosia & Aesop	Morten Lindberg*^{†‡}	Ingar Heine Bergby and Norwegian Radio Orchestra
2016	Magnificat	Morten Lindberg*^{†‡}	Øyvind Gimse, Anita Brevik, Nidarosdomens Jentekor and Trondheimsolistene
2016	Shostakovich: Symphony No. 7	Erdo Groot*^{†} and Philip Traugott^{‡}	Paavo Järvi and Russian National Orchestra
2016	Spes	Morten Lindberg*^{†‡}	Tove Ramlo-Ystad and Cantus
2017
2017	Dutilleux: Sur le Même Accord; Les Citations; Mystères de l'Instant & Timbres, Espace, Mouvement	Alexander Lipay* and Dmitriy Lipay*^{†‡}	Ludovic Morlot and the Seattle Symphony
2017	Johnson: Considering Matthew Shepard	Brad Michel*^{†} and Robina G. Young^{‡}	Craig Hella Johnson and Conspirare
2017	Maja Ratkje: And Sing...	Morten Lindberg*^{†‡}	Maja Ratkje, Cikada & the Oslo Sinfonietta
2017	Primus & the Chocolate Factory (5.1 Surround Sound Edition)	Les Claypool*^{‡} and Stephen Marcussen^{†}	Primus
2017	Reflections	Morten Lindberg*^{†‡}	Oyvind Gimse, Geir Inge Lotsberg and TrondheimSolistene
2018
2018	Early Americans	Jim Anderson*^{‡}, Darcy Proper^{†} and Jane Ira Bloom^{‡}	Jane Ira Bloom
2018	3-D The Catalogue	Fritz Hilpert*^{‡} and Tom Ammermann^{†}	Kraftwerk
2018	Kleiberg: Mass for Modern Man	Morten Lindberg*^{†‡}*	Eivind Gullberg Jensen, Trondheim Symphony Orchestra and Trondheim Vokalensemble
2018	So Is My Love	Morten Lindberg*^{†‡}*	Nina T. Karlsen and Ensemble 96
2018	Tyberg: Masses	Jesse Brayman*^{†} and Blanton Alspaugh^{‡}	Brian A. Schmidt, Christopher Jacobson and South Dakota Chorale
2019
2019	Eye in the Sky — 35th Anniversary Edition	Alan Parsons*^{†‡}, Dave Donnelly^{†} and P.J. Olsson^{†}	Alan Parsons Project
2019	Folketoner	Morten Lindberg*^{†‡}	Anne Karin Sundal-Ask and det Norske Jentekor
2019	Seven Words from the Cross	Daniel Shores*^{†} and Dan Merceruio^{‡}	Matthew Guard and Skylark
2019	Sommerro: Ujamaa & the Iceberg	Morten Lindberg*^{†‡}	Ingar Heine Bergby and the Trondheim Symphony Orchestra and Choir
2019	Symbol	Prashant Mistry*^{‡}, Ronald Prent*^{‡} and Darcy Proper^{†}	Engine-Earz Experiment

=== 2020s ===
Year^{[I]}	Work	Recipient(s)	Artist(s)
2020
2020	Lux	Morten Lindberg*^{†‡}	Anita Brevik, Trondheimsolistene and Nidarosdomens Jentekor
2020	Chain Tripping	Luke Argilla*; Jurgen Scharpf^{†}; Jona Bechtolt^{‡}, Claire L. Evans^{‡} and Rob Kieswetter^{‡}	Yacht
2020	Kverndokk: Symphonic Dances	Jim Anderson*, Bob Ludwig^{†} and Ulrike Schwarz^{‡}	Ken-David Masur and Stavanger Symphony Orchestra
2020	The Orchestral Organ	Keith O. Johnson*^{†}; Marina A. Ledin^{‡} and Victor Ledin^{‡}	Jan Kraybill
2020	The Savior	Bob Clearmountain*; Bob Ludwig^{†}; Michael Marquart^{‡} and Dave Way^{‡}	A Bad Think
2021
2021	Soundtrack of the American Soldier	Leslie Ann Jones*, Michael Romanowski^{†} and Dan Merceruio^{‡}	Jim R. Keene and the United States Army Field Band
2021	Bolstad: Tomba Sonora	Morten Lindberg*^{†‡}	Stemmeklang
2021	Dear Future Self (Dolby Atmos Mixes)	Fritz Hilpert*, Jason Banks^{†}, Fritz Hilpert^{†}, David Ziegler^{†}, Tom Ammerman^{‡}, Arno Kammermeier^{‡} and Walter Merziger^{‡}	Booka Shade
2021	Fryd	Morten Lindberg*^{†‡}	Tove Ramlo-Ystad and Cantus
2021	Mutt Slang II — A Wake of Sorrows Engulfed in Rage	Elliot Scheiner*, Darcy Proper^{†}, Alain Mallet^{‡} and Elliot Scheiner^{‡}	Alain Mallet
2022
2022	Alicia	George Massenburg*, Eric Schilling*, Michael Romanowski^{†} and Ann Mincieli^{‡}	Alicia Keys
2022	Clique	Jim Anderson*^{‡}, Ulrike Schwarz* and Bob Ludwig^{†}	Patricia Barber
2022	Fine Line	Greg Penny*^{†‡}	Harry Styles
2022	The Future Bites	Jake Fields*, Steven Wilson*, Bob Ludwig^{†} and Steven Wilson^{‡}	Steven Wilson
2022	Stille Grender	Morten Lindberg*^{†‡}	Anne Karin Sundal-Ask and Det Norske Jentekor
2023
2023	Divine Tides	Eric Schilling*; Stewart Copeland, Ricky Kej^{‡} and Herbert Waltl^{‡}	Stewart Copeland and Ricky Kej
2023	Aguilera	Jaycen Joshua*^{†} and Mike Seaberg*^{†}	Christina Aguilera
2023	Memories...Do Not Open	Mike Placentini*^{†}, Adam Alpert^{‡}, Alex Pall^{‡}, Jordan Stilwell^{‡} and Andrew Taggart^{‡}	The Chainsmokers
2023	Picturing the Invisible — Focus 1	Jim Anderson*, Morten Lindberg^{†}, Ulrike Schwartz^{†}; Jane Ira Bloom^{‡} and Ulrike Schwartz^{‡}	Jane Ira Bloom
2023	Tuvayhun — Beatitudes for a Wounded World	Morten Lindberg*^{†}^{‡}	Nidarosdomens Jentekor and Trondheimsolistene
2024
2024	The Diary of Alicia Keys	George Massenburg*, Eric Schilling^{*}, Michael Romanowski^{†}, Alicia Keys^{‡} and Ann Mincieli^{‡}	Alicia Keys
2024	Act 3 (Immersive Edition)	Ryan Ulyate^{*‡} and Michael Romanowski^{†}	Ryan Ulyate
2024	Blue Clear Sky	Chuck Ainlay^{*‡} and Michael Romanowski^{†}	George Strait
2024	God of War Ragnarök (Original Soundtrack)	Eric Schilling^{*}, Michael Romanowski^{†}, Kellog Boynton^{‡}, Peter Scaturro^{‡} and Herbert Waltl^{‡}	Bear McCreary
2024	Silence Between Songs	Aaron Short^{‡}	Madison Beer
2025
2025	i/o (In-Side Mix)	Hans-Martin Buff* and Peter Gabriel^{‡}	Peter Gabriel
2025	Avalon	Bob Clearmountain*, Rhett Davies^{‡} and Bryan Ferry^{‡}	Roxy Music
2025	Genius Loves Company	Michael Romanowski*, Eric Schilling*, Herbert Waltl*, Michael Romanowski^{†} and John Burk^{‡}	Ray Charles and Various Artists
2025	Henning Sommerro: Borders	Morten Lindberg*^{†‡}	Trondheim Symphony Orchestra
2025	Pax	Morten Lindberg*^{†‡}	Ensemble 96 and Current Saxophone Quartet
2026
2026	Immersed	Justin Gray*^{‡}, Michael Rowanowski^{†}, Drew Jurecka^{‡} and Morten Lindberg^{‡}	Justin Gray
2026	All American Fuckboy	Andrew Law*	Duckwrth
2026	An Immersive Tribute to Astor Piazolla (Live)	Andrés Mayo*^{‡} and Martin Muscatello*^{‡}	Various Artists
2026	Tearjerkers	Hans-Martin Buff*^{‡}	Tearjerkers
2026	Yule	Morten Lindberg*^{†}^{‡} and Arve Henriksen^{‡}	Trio Mediæval
2027	Winner TBA on 7 February 2027		
2027	Captain Fantastic & the Brown Dirt Cowboy (50th Anniversary Edition)	Greg Penny * / ^{‡}	Elton John
2027	Ghost of Yõtei (Soundtrack)	Eric Schilling * / Kellogg Boynton, Keith Leary, Peter Scaturro & Herbert Walti ^{‡}	Toma Otowa
2027	The Grotesque and the Sublime	Daniel Shores * / ^{†}	Iceland Symphony Orchestra
2027	One Size Fits All	Karma Auger & Erich Gobel * / Joe Travers ^{‡}	Frank Zappa & the Mothers of Invention
2027	Petal	John Hanes *	Ariana Grande

Legend:
* = Surround Mix Engineer (from 2020: Immersive Audio Engineer, from 2023: Immersive Mix Engineer)
^{†} = Surround Mastering Engineer (from 2020: Immersive Audio Mastering Engineer, from 2023: Immersive Mastering Engineer)
^{‡} = Surround Producer (from 2020: Immersive Audio Producer, from 2023: Immersive Producer)
