= Morten Lindberg (sound engineer) =

Norwegian music producer

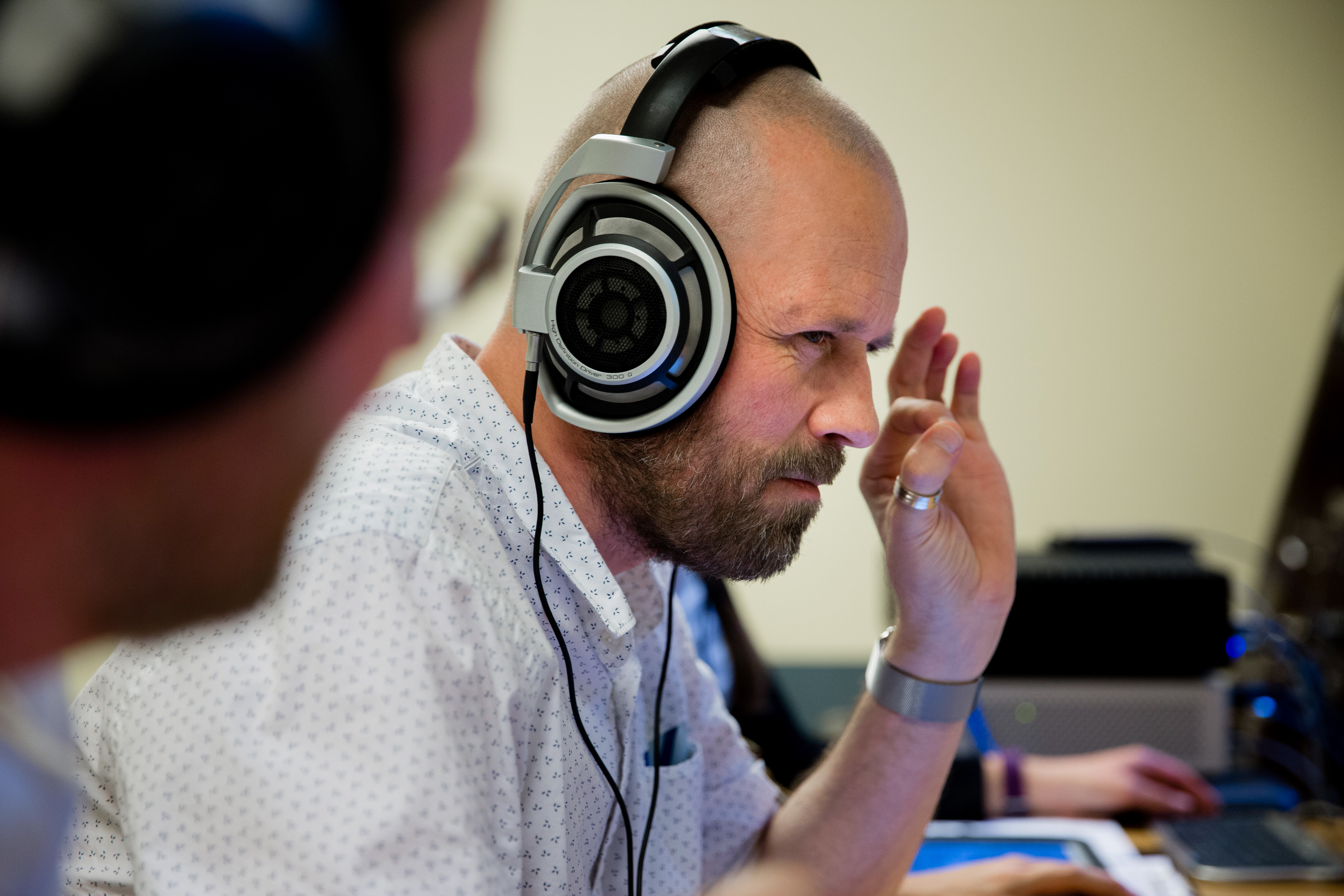
- Morten Lindberg
- Born: August 15, 1970 (age 56); Skien, Norway
- Occupations: Sound engineer, music producer

Morten Lindberg (born 15 August 1970) is a Norwegian sound engineer and music producer, specialising in classical music productions. As a producer and engineer, he held the record for most Grammy nominations without a win, with twenty-eight through 2019, until 2020 when he won his first Grammy.

Lindberg was born in Skien, Norway, and started his career in 1992 with his production company Lindberg Lyd, followed by the record label 2L which he created with Wolfgang Plagge and Jorn Simenstad in 2001. The company specialises in high quality recordings of Nordic classical music, often recorded in concert halls, churches, etc.

The 2L record label has received 46 Grammy nominations, including 38 (as of 2024) for Mr Lindberg in craft categories Best Engineered Album, Best Surround Sound Album, Best Immersive Audio Album and Producer of the Year. Proving his dominance in Best Surround Sound Album, he received three nominations in a field of five at the 58th Grammy Awards in 2016. Lindberg has also been nominated in other categories, such as Best Choral Performance and Best Engineered Album, Classical.

He finally won his first Grammy Award in 2020 for Best Immersive Audio Album. Up to and including the 67th Grammy Awards, Lindberg has received 38 nominations with one win.

He usually works with Norwegian and other Scandinavian ensembles and soloists, such as the Trondheim Soloists, Ensemble 96, Uranienborg Vokalensemble, Nidarosdomens jentekor and Det Norske Jentekor.

== Awards and nominations ==
Year	Organization	Award	Work	Result
2016	Spellemannprisen	Årets produsent (Producer of the Year)	Himself	Nominated
2017	Spellemannprisen	Årets produsent (Producer of the Year)	Himself	Nominated

=== Grammy Awards ===
Year	Nominee / work	Award	Result	Ref.
2007	Immortal Nystedt	Best Surround Sound Album	Nominated	
2009	Divertimenti	Best Surround Sound Album	Nominated	
2009	Divertimenti	Best Engineered Album, Classical	Nominated	
2010	Flute Mystery	Best Surround Sound Album	Nominated	
2010	Kleiberg: Treble & Bass	Best Surround Sound Album	Nominated	
2011	Trondheimsolistene – In Folk Style	Best Surround Sound Album	Nominated	
2012	Kind	Best Surround Sound Album	Nominated	
2013	Quiet Winter Night	Best Surround Sound Album	Nominated	
2013	Souvenir	Best Engineered Album, Classical	Nominated	
2014	Hymn to the Virgin	Best Engineered Album, Classical	Nominated	
2014	La Voie Triomphale	Best Engineered Album, Classical	Nominated	
2014	Kleiberg: David and Bathsheba	Best Opera Recording	Nominated	
2015	Himself	Producer of the Year, Classical	Nominated	
2015	Beppe: Remote Galaxy	Best Surround Sound Album	Nominated	
2016	Amdahl: Astrognosia & Aesop	Best Surround Sound Album	Nominated	
2016	Magnificat	Best Surround Sound Album	Nominated	
2016	Spes	Best Surround Sound Album	Nominated	
2017	Maja S.K. Ratkje: And Sing...	Best Surround Sound Album	Nominated	
2017	Reflections	Best Surround Sound Album	Nominated	
2017	Reflections	Best Engineered Album, Classical	Nominated	
2018	Kleiberg: Mass for Modern Man	Best Surround Sound Album	Nominated	
2018	Kleiberg: Mass for Modern Man	Best Engineered Album, Classical	Nominated	
2018	Himself	Producer of the Year, Classical	Nominated	
2018	So Is My Love	Best Surround Sound Album	Nominated	
2019	Folketoner	Best Immersive Audio Album	Nominated	
2019	Sommerro: Ujamaa & The Iceberg	Best Immersive Audio Album	Nominated	
2020	Lux	Best Immersive Audio Album	Won	
2020	Himself	Producer of the Year, Classical	Nominated	
2021	Fryd	Best Immersive Audio Album	Nominated	
2021	Bolstad: Tomba Sonora	Best Immersive Audio Album	Nominated	
2022	Sommerro: Ujamaa & The Iceberg	Best Immersive Audio Album	Nominated	
2023	Picturing The Invisible - Focus 1	Best Immersive Audio Album	Nominated	
2023	Tuvayhun — Beatitudes For A Wounded World	Best Immersive Audio Album	Nominated	
2023	Tuvayhun — Beatitudes For A Wounded World	Best Engineered Album, Classical	Nominated	
2024	Himself	Producer of the Year, Classical	Nominated	
2025	Himself	Producer of the Year, Classical	Nominated	
2025	Henning Sommerro: Borders	Best Immersive Audio Album	Nominated	
2025	Pax	Best Immersive Audio Album	Nominated	
