= Rudy Van Gelder =

American recording engineer (1924–2016)

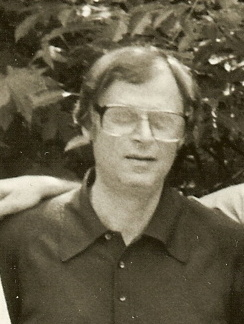
- Van Gelder at his Englewood Cliffs, New Jersey studio, January 1976

Background information
- Born: November 2, 1924; Jersey City, New Jersey, U.S.
- Died: August 25, 2016 (aged 91) Englewood Cliffs, New Jersey, U.S.
- Genres: Jazz
- Occupation: Audio engineer
- Labels: Blue Note Records; Prestige Records; Impulse! Records; CTI Records

Rudolph Van Gelder (November 2, 1924 – August 25, 2016) was an American recording engineer who specialized in jazz. Over more than half a century, he recorded several thousand sessions, with musicians including Booker Ervin, John Coltrane, Miles Davis, Thelonious Monk, Sonny Rollins, Jimmy Smith, Art Blakey, Bud Powell, Lee Morgan, Joe Henderson, Freddie Hubbard, Wayne Shorter, Horace Silver, Herbie Hancock, Grant Green, and George Benson. Van Gelder worked with many different record companies, and recorded almost every session on Blue Note Records from 1953 to 1967.

He worked on albums including Coltrane's A Love Supreme, Davis' Walkin', Hancock's Maiden Voyage, Rollins' Saxophone Colossus, and Silver's Song for My Father. Van Gelder is regarded as one of the most influential engineers in jazz.

== Early life ==
Van Gelder was born in Jersey City, New Jersey. His parents, Louis Van Gelder and Sarah née Cohen ran a women's clothing store in Passaic. His interest in microphones and electronics can be traced to a youthful enthusiasm for amateur radio. He was also a longtime jazz fan. His uncle, for whom Rudy was named, had been the drummer for Ted Lewis' band in the mid-1930s. During his high school years, Rudy Van Gelder took trumpet lessons and played in the school band.

Van Gelder trained as an optometrist at Philadelphia's Pennsylvania College of Optometry because he did not think he could earn a living as a recording engineer. He received an O.D. degree from the institution in 1946. Thereafter, he maintained an optometry practice in Teaneck, New Jersey, until 1959 when he made the transition to full-time recording engineer.

== Career ==
In the evenings after work, Van Gelder recorded local musicians who wanted 78-rpm recordings of their work. From 1946, Van Gelder recorded in his parents' house in Hackensack, New Jersey, in which a control room was built adjacent to the living room, which served as the musicians' performing area. The dry acoustics of the working space were partly responsible for Van Gelder's inimitable recording aesthetic.

"When I first started, I was interested in improving the quality of the playback equipment I had," he commented in 2005; "I never was really happy with what I heard. I always assumed the records made by the big companies sounded better than what I could reproduce. So that's how I got interested in the process. I acquired everything I could to play back audio: speakers, turntables, amplifiers". One of Van Gelder's friends, the baritone saxophonist Gil Mellé, introduced him to Alfred Lion, a producer for Blue Note Records, in 1953.

In the 1950s, Van Gelder performed engineering and mastering for the classical label Vox Records. He became a full-time recording engineer in 1959. In 1959, he moved Van Gelder Studio to a larger purpose-built facility in Englewood Cliffs, a few miles southeast of the original location. An obituarist in the Daily Telegraph, a British newspaper, wrote of "Van Gelder's extreme fastidiousness" as an engineer, and his insistence on "no food or drink in the studio, and on no account was anyone to touch a microphone. He himself always wore gloves when handling equipment".

=== Later career ===
Though his output slowed, Van Gelder remained active as a recording engineer into the new century. In the late 1990s, he worked as a recording engineer for some of the songs featured in the soundtracks for the Japanese anime series Cowboy Bebop. From 1999, he remastered the analog Blue Note recordings he had made several decades earlier into 24-bit digital recordings in its RVG Edition series. He was positive about the switch from analog to digital technology. He told Audio magazine in 1995:

The biggest distorter is the LP itself. I've made thousands of LP masters. I used to make 17 a day, with two lathes going simultaneously, and I'm glad to see the LP go. As far as I'm concerned, good riddance. It was a constant battle to try to make that music sound the way it should. It was never any good. And if people don't like what they hear in digital, they should blame the engineer who did it. Blame the mastering house. Blame the mixing engineer. That's why some digital recordings sound terrible, and I'm not denying that they do, but don't blame the medium.

Van Gelder continued to live in Englewood Cliffs until his death on August 25, 2016.

== The Van Gelder sound ==
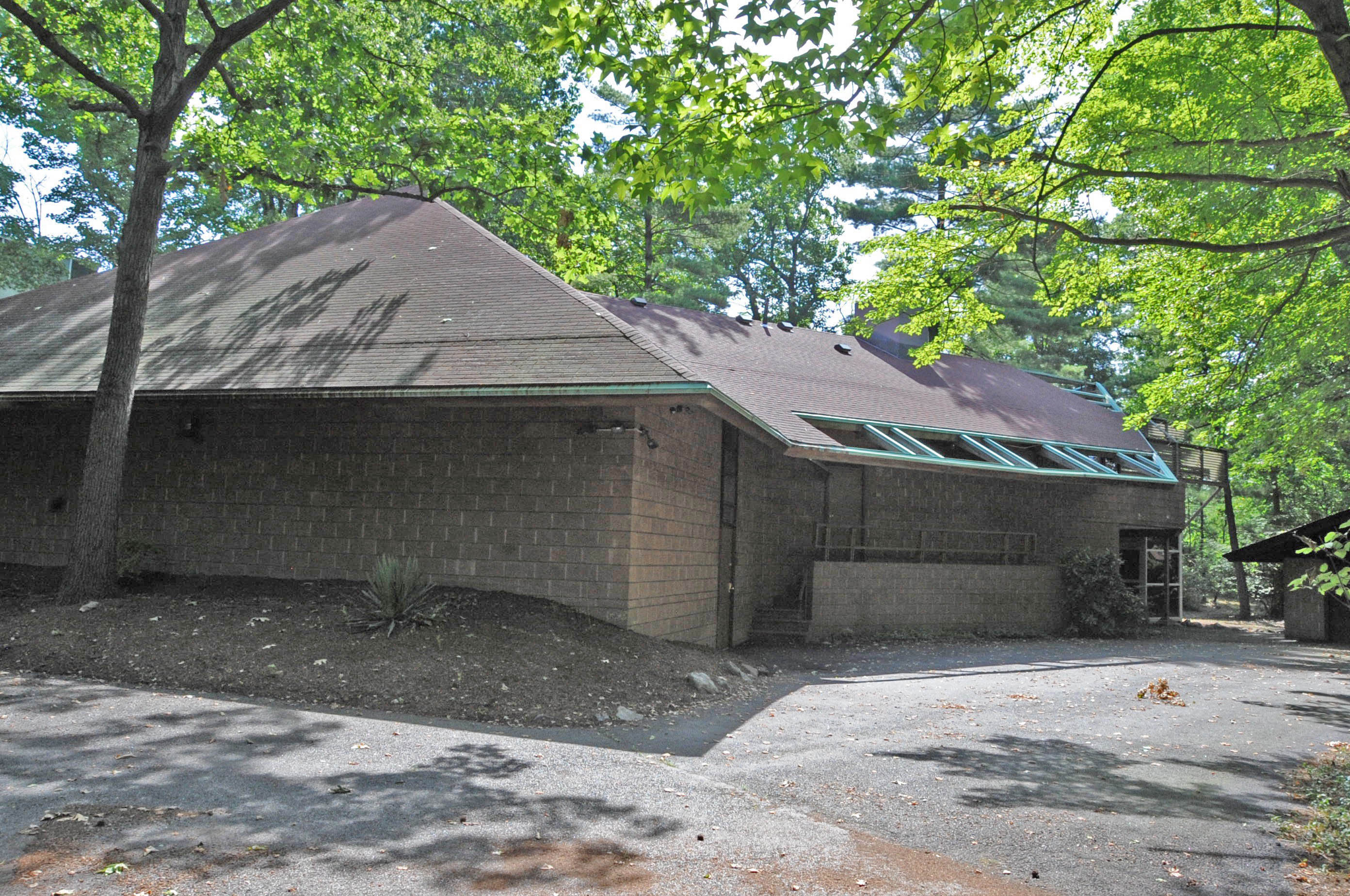
The Van Gelder Studio in Englewood Cliffs, New Jersey, was listed on the National Register of Historic Places in 2022.

Van Gelder was secretive about his recording methods, leaving fans and critics to speculate about his techniques. He would go as far as to move microphones when bands were being photographed in the studio. His recording techniques are often admired by his fans for their transparency, clarity, realism, warmth and presence. Van Gelder pioneered use of close miking techniques, peak limiting, and tape saturation to imbue the music with an added sense of immediacy. He also demonstrated a commitment to superior signal-to-noise ratio while recording and mastering, allowing him to achieve greater volume on his LPs and minimize tape hiss and vinyl surface noise. Van Gelder was unusual compared to other recording engineers of the time insofar as he enjoyed ownership of the entire recording and post-recording process (excepting the pressing of the records themselves). The control gave Van Gelder the opportunity to ensure that the final records reflected the sound of the original tape recording, with each record bearing his hallmark: a small 'RVG' inscribed into the run-out area.

Though instrumental in developing the so-called 'Blue Note sound', Van Gelder's approach was often dictated by the production personnel with whom he worked. Blue Note's Alfred Lion worked closely with Van Gelder during sessions:

Alfred knew exactly what he wanted to hear. He communicated it to me and I got it for him technically. He was amazing in what he heard and how he would patiently draw it out of me.

Such close supervision rarely applied when Van Gelder was recording for other labels, like Prestige or Savoy, enabling him to explore and pioneer new sound engineering techniques:

When I experimented, I would experiment on Bob Weinstock's projects. Bob didn't think much of sound... So if I got a new microphone and I wanted to try it on a saxophone player, I would never try it on Alfred's date. Weinstock didn't give a damn, and it worked out great. Alfred would benefit from that...

Despite his prominence in recording jazz, some artists avoided Van Gelder's studio. The bassist and composer Charles Mingus refused to record with him. Taking Leonard Feather's "blindfold test" in 1960, he said that Van Gelder "tries to change people's tones. I've seen him do it; I've seen him do it; I've seen him take Thad Jones and the way he sets him up at the mic, he can change the whole sound. That's why I never go to him; he ruined my bass sound". Even Blue Note president and producer Alfred Lion criticized Van Gelder for what Lion felt was his occasional overuse of reverb, and would jokingly refer to this trait as a "Rudy special" on tape boxes.

Richard Cook called Van Gelder's characteristic method of recording and mixing the piano "as distinctive as the pianists' playing" itself. The unique sonic quality is considered a key component of the Van Gelder sound. Such a piano sound was initially the consequence of recording in a living room rather than a purpose built recording facility, where close miking of the piano strings was necessary to avoid sound bleed from other instruments. Although creating a distinctive albeit compressed piano sound, critics of the Van Gelder sound of the 1950s and 1960s have focused on Van Gelder's recording of pianos as a particular source of criticism:

The best Van Gelder recordings feature wonderful-sounding brass, bass walks, and cymbal shimmers, but one instrument he rarely got right was the piano, which, on most of his albums, sounds hooded. Some engineers suspect this was due to reflections over the piano, brought on by the shape and size of his parents' living room and, later, his studio. It may be significant, in this regard, that his best-sounding album (and one of his best musically too), Eric Dolphy's Out to Lunch!, does not feature a piano.

Van Gelder was criticized for his use of compression and high-frequency boosting, both of which, it is claimed, compromise the sound. Journalist and radio producer George Hicks wrote:

For many of us in the recording trade, Van Gelder might be the most overrated engineer in audio history... Van Gelder would alter the sounds of the individual instruments–and the entire recording–with compression, equalization and reverberation both as they were being recorded, and after... But for me, the so-called "Blue Note sound" has always been a musical, rather than audio, innovation, and Van Gelder less a peerless technician than a sonic visionary."

Writer Stanley Crouch argued in an interview with Ethan Iverson that Van Gelder made particular adjustments to the sound of John Coltrane's tenor saxophone sound when engineering Coltrane's Impulse! Records sessions: "I know the difference between the sound of someone in person and the recorded sound of an engineer. Coltrane's tone was much darker and thicker than the sound on those Impulse! records engineered by Rudy Van Gelder. But maybe Van Gelder chose that sound because he could hear that Coltrane was an alto player first before switching to tenor."

== Reputation ==
Within a few years of opening his studio, Van Gelder was in demand by many other independent labels based in the New York City area including Prestige Records. Bob Weinstock, owner of Prestige, recalled in 1999: "Rudy was very much an asset. His rates were fair and he didn't waste time. When you arrived at his studio he was prepared. His equipment was always ahead of its time and he was a genius when it came to recording". According to a JazzTimes article in August 2016, "jazz lore has formed the brands into a yin and yang of sorts: The Blue Note albums involved more original music, with rehearsal and the stringent, consistent oversight of Lion; Weinstock was more nonchalant, organizing what were essentially blowing sessions for some of the best musicians in jazz history".

Van Gelder said in 2012, "Alfred was rigid about how he wanted Blue Note records to sound. But Bob Weinstock of Prestige was more easygoing, so I'd experiment on his dates and use what I learned on the Blue Note sessions". He also worked for Savoy Records in this period, among others. "To accommodate everyone, I assigned different days of the week to different labels". Writer Fred Kaplan said that Van Gelder's reputation with the record-buying public was aided by Blue Note Records' conspicuous mentions of Van Gelder on their album covers:

Van Gelder was hardly the only great jazz engineer on the scene in those days; he may not even have been the best. Other stellar figures included Fred Plaut at Columbia, Roy DuNann at Contemporary, Val Valentin at Verve, Roy Goodman at RCA. But the other labels didn't play up their engineers (Columbia covers never so much as mentioned Plaut), while Alfred Lion, Blue Note's proprietor, promoted Van Gelder's sound as a boutique blend—something of a mystique—and the other labels who hired him followed suit, as if to boast that they too had the special sauce.

== Awards and honors ==
- In 2009 he was named a Jazz Master by the National Endowment for the Arts.
- In 2012 he received the Grammy Trustees Award.
- In 2013 Van Gelder received the Audio Engineering Society's Gold Medal.

== See also ==
- Category:Albums recorded at Van Gelder Studio
