= David Huber =

David Huber may refer to:

- David L. Huber, United States Attorney for the Western District of Kentucky
- David Lee Huber, perpetrator of the 2021 Sunrise, Florida shootout
- David Miles Huber, American composer and producer
- David R. Huber, American engineer
