= Grammy Award for Best Engineered Recording =

Grammy Award for Best Engineered Recording may refer to:

- Grammy Award for Best Engineered Album, Classical
- Grammy Award for Best Engineered Album, Non-Classical
