= Jack Renner =

Jack Renner is the name of:

- Jack Renner (golfer), American golfer
- Jack Renner (recording engineer), classically trained musician and recording engineer
