= Charlie Post =

American Grammy awarded audio engineer

Charlie Post is an American audio engineer who has been the audio engineer of the Chicago Symphony Orchestra (CSO) since 2014. He has won the Grammy Award for Best Engineered Album, Classical three times.

Post studied at Schenectady County Community College and the State University of New York at Fredonia, graduating in 1998. He worked in New York City recording studios and Miami venues, and was chief audio engineer of Seiji Ozawa Hall at Tanglewood from 2007 to 2016.

Post won his first Grammy in 2021 for the CSO's recording of Shostakovich's Symphony No. 13 (Babi Yar) under Riccardo Muti, and his second in 2023 for Mason Bates's Philharmonia Fantastique: The Making of the Orchestra. His third came at the 66th Annual Grammy Awards in 2024 for Contemporary American Composers, which he engineered with David Frost.
