= Bernhard Paumgartner =

Austrian conductor, composer and musicologist

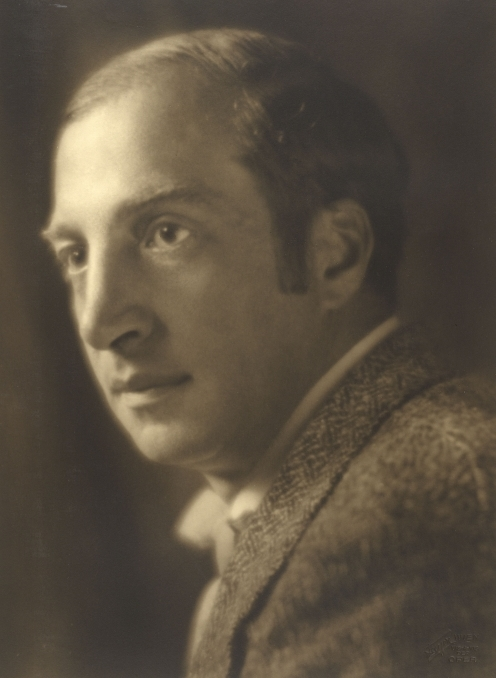
Bernhard Paumgartner (1887–1971)

Bernhard Paumgartner (1887–1971) was an Austrian conductor, composer and musicologist.

== Biography ==
Paumgartner was born 14 November 1887 in Vienna.

In 1917, he became the head of the Mozarteum music academy in Salzburg where he taught both Herbert von Karajan and Vittorio Negri. In 1945, Paumgartner played a major role in reintroduction of the Salzburg Festivals. In 1956, Paumgartner played a major role in one week Mozart festival to commemorate the 200th birthday of Mozart.

Paumgartner died in Salzburg on 27 July 1971.

== Works ==
- Das Taghorn – Works of minnesingers (1922)
- "Das heisse Eisen" play/opera (1923)
- "Die Hoehle von Salamanca" opera (1923)
- Mozart – Biography (1927)
- "Der Rossini in Neapel" play/opera (1935)
- Franz Schubert. Eine Biographie – Biography (1943). Published in Spain by Alianza Editorial, SA, in 1992, under the title Franz Schubert.
- Bach – Biography (1950)
- Mozart – Biography (1957). Published in Spain by Alianza Editorial, SA, in 1991.
- Das von der Antike Instrumentelle Ensemble bis zur Gegenwart (1966)
- Einige Bemerkungen zu Mozarts Oper, genannt "Zaide" [Some Remarks on Mozart's Opera "Zaide"] in "Salzburg Festival 1968: Official Program", Salzburg.1968, pp. 121-123.

== Decorations and awards ==
- Honorary title of privy councillor
- Honorary doctorate from the Faculty of Philosophy, University of Salzburg (14 November 1967)
- Austrian Decoration for Science and Art (1962)
- Honorary Citizen of the City of Salzburg (1963)
- Ring of Salzburg (1963)
- Naming of Bernhard-Paumgartner-Weg in Salzburg
