= Vittorio Negri =

Italian conductor, record producer, and musicologist

Vittorio Negri (October 16, 1923 - April 9, 1998) was an Italian conductor, record producer, and musicologist.

Negri was born in Milan. He initially studied at the Milan Conservatory, then at the Salzburg Mozarteum, where he became assistant conductor under Bernhard Paumgartner in 1952. He initially worked on critical editions for I Musici, but took a position with Philips in the late 1950s as a record producer. He became a prolific producer for Philips's classical music department and recorded copiously for them as conductor of the Berlin Chamber Orchestra and the Dresden Staatskapelle. He devoted much of his recording energies to Vivaldi, while continuing to work on musicological projects; he surfaced a lost work of Cimarosa's, the Requiem in G Minor, and subsequently performed and recorded it. In the 1980s he led a chamber orchestra in Perugia, having primarily given up producing. He was the founder of the Italian Society of Musicology.

His significant studies and publishing of critical editions, especially in the Baroque repertoire, led to him gaining a large reputation. His edition of Corelli's Concerti grossi, Op. 6 was revised and recorded by I Musici and received critical acclaim.

== Recordings ==
Negri received two Grammy Awards in 1969 (for conducting choral and instrumental works of Giovanni Gabrieli recorded by Columbia), one in 1972 (for his contribution as engineer on a Philips recording conducted by Colin Davis), and one in 1980 (as the producer of the Best Opera Recording which was conducted by Colin Davis).

His recordings for Philips include a large project, undertaken between 1974 and 1979 (with later additions in 1990), to resurface and record all of Antonio Vivaldi's sacred music. The cycle featured Negri leading the John Alldis Choir, Berlin Radio Soloists' Ensemble, English Chamber Orchestra, Concertgebouw Chamber Orchestra and the Berlin Chamber Orchestra. The soloists include Margaret Marshall, Felicity Lott, Linda Finnie, Ann Murray, Birgit Finnilä, Anne Collins, Sally Burgess, Elly Ameling, Ingeborg Springer, Julia Hamari, Annelies Burmeister, Jochen Kowalski, Nico van der Meel, Anthony Rolfe Johnson, Robert Holl, Thomas Thomaschke and Anton Scharinger.

In 1976 he recorded The Four Seasons with violinist Félix Ayo (who had recorded it twice earlier) and the Berlin Chamber Orchestra, which received critical acclaim. Richard Freed of the Washington Post said: "[It] seems to combine the virtues of all the best virtues of the past in its vigor, stylishness, soloist-ensemble balance, and marvelous sense of shared delight. This is the one recording of The Four Seasons I would choose to live with now if compelled to limit myself to a single version." Freed ends with relating the recording to a quote by Austrian pianist Artur Schnabel: "They are a safe supply of happiness".

He made the premiere recording of Mozart's La Betulia liberata in 1977 with a cast headed by Birgit Finnilä and Claes H. Ahnsjö on Philips and the first (and only) recording of Cimarosa's Requiem in G minor, a work which he rediscovered himself.
