= Donald Neuen =

American conductor and academic

Donald Neuen is an American choral conductor, composer, arranger, editor, and educator who was formerly the Distinguished Professor of Conducting and Director of Choral Activities at the University of California, Los Angeles. He conducted the UCLA Chorale while teaching courses in conducting and directing one of the most respected graduate programs in choral conducting in the United States. He was 80 years old when he retired.

== Early life and education ==
Raised in what Neuen described as "the small, enormously musical, Swiss-Mennonite community of Berne, Indiana,", Neuen studied under and was heavily influenced by Robert Shaw (the former Music Director of the Atlanta Symphony Orchestra, founder of the Atlanta Symphony Orchestra Chorus in Georgia, and famous for his Robert Shaw Chorale).

== Career ==
Neuen served as the Assistant Conductor and the Director of Choral Activities for the Atlanta Symphony Orchestra.

Neuen led the Los Angeles-based Angeles Chorale as Artistic Director for 13 years, from 1996 to 2009. He was the former director of the Cathedral Choir at the Crystal Cathedral in Garden Grove, California. Before his tenure at UCLA, Neuen was a member of the faculty of the Eastman School of Music in Rochester, New York.

Neuen has also served on the faculties of the University of Wisconsin, University of Tennessee, Ball State University, and Georgia State University. His students have gone on to lead major choruses and orchestras throughout the world. He has released videos in the Choral Excellence Series as well as a collegiate choral conducting textbook, Choral Concepts.

Neuen is a National Patron of Delta Omicron, an international professional music fraternity.
