= Robert Shaw (conductor) =

American conductor

- Robert Shaw

Background information
- Born: 30 April 1916; Red Bluff, California
- Died: 25 January 1999 (aged 82) New Haven, Connecticut

Robert Lawson Shaw (30 April 1916 – 25 January 1999) was an American conductor most famous for his work with his namesake Chorale, with the Cleveland Orchestra and Chorus, and the Atlanta Symphony Orchestra and Chorus. He was known for drawing public attention to choral music through his wide-ranging influence and mentoring of younger conductors, the high standard of his recordings, his support for racial integration in his choruses, and his support for modern music, winning many awards throughout his career.

== Biography ==
=== Early life ===
Robert Lawson Shaw was born in Red Bluff, California. His father, Rev. Shirley R. Shaw, was a minister, and his mother was a concert singer. He had four siblings, one of whom was singer Hollace Shaw. Shaw attended Eagle Rock High School in the early 1930s where he sang in the choirs directed by Howard Swan, a man who would later have a lengthy career as an internationally renowned choral director at Occidental College from 1934 through 1971, and whose career and writings on choral music were the subject of a symposium at the national conference of the American Choral Directors Association in 1987. Shaw graduated from Pomona College in the class of 1938. Shortly afterward, Shaw was hired by popular band leader Fred Waring to recruit and train a glee club that would sing with the band.

=== Career ===
In 1941, Shaw founded the Collegiate Chorale, a group notable in its day for its racial integration. In 1948, the group performed Beethoven's Symphony No. 9 with the NBC Symphony and Arturo Toscanini, who famously remarked, "In Robert Shaw I have at last found the maestro I have been looking for." Shaw continued to prepare choirs for Toscanini until March 1954, when they sang in Te Deum by Verdi and the prologue to Mefistofele by Boito. Shaw's choirs participated in the NBC broadcast performances of three Verdi operas: Aida, Falstaff and A Masked Ball, all conducted by Toscanini, with soprano Herva Nelli. They can be seen on the home videos of the telecasts of Aida (from 1949) and Beethoven's Ninth Symphony (from April 1948), also conducted by Toscanini. As the video shows, Toscanini refused to take a bow until he went backstage and brought an apparently reluctant Shaw out to take a joint bow at the end of the Beethoven telecast.

In 1946, he conducted the Naumburg Orchestral Concerts, in the Naumburg Bandshell, Central Park, in the summer series.

External audio
- You may hear Robert Shaw conducting Johann Sebastian Bach's Magnificat in D major, BWV 243 with the RCA Victor Orchestra in 1947 Here on archive.org

Shaw was also Charles F. Shaw's second cousin and often vacationed at his winery in Napa Valley. He went on to found the Robert Shaw Chorale in 1948, a group which produced numerous recordings on RCA Victor up until his appointment in Atlanta. The Chorale visited 30 countries in tours sponsored by the U.S. State Department. In 1952 he was choral director for the Broadway musical, My Darlin' Aida. Shaw was named music director of the San Diego Symphony in 1953 and served in that post for four years.

Following his San Diego tenure, Shaw joined George Szell, one of his prior teachers at Mannes School of Music in New York, to work with the Cleveland Orchestra in 1956. He served as the assistant conductor of the Cleveland Orchestra for eleven seasons until 1967. He also took over the fledgling Cleveland Orchestra Chorus (started in 1952) and fine-tuned it into one of the finest all-volunteer choral ensembles sponsored by an American symphony orchestra - an ensemble that continues to this day. While in Cleveland, Shaw was also the choral director at the First Unitarian Church of Cleveland where he led a community music program.

From 1967 to 1988 Shaw was music director and conductor of the Atlanta Symphony Orchestra. In 1970, he founded the Atlanta Symphony Orchestra Chorus and worked to recreate the success he had had for Cleveland in preparing them for performances and recordings with their namesake symphony orchestra.

On 30 April 1972, Shaw conducted a massed 640-voice chorus made up of auditioned university choirs from 16 different countries invited to the Third International University Choral Festival to perform at the Lincoln Center for the Performing Arts, New York after a two-week concert tour of USA university campuses. A recording was made of the festival concert. During their tour, on the eve of the breaking of the Watergate Scandal, the choirs also performed before First Lady Pat Nixon, at the White House, the John F. Kennedy Center for the Performing Arts, and the United Nations.

After stepping down from his Atlanta post in 1988, Shaw continued to conduct the Atlanta Symphony Orchestra as its music director emeritus and conductor laureate, was a regular guest conductor with other orchestras, including Cleveland, and taught in a series of summer festivals and week-long Carnegie Hall workshops for choral conductors and singers. He can be seen again conducting the Atlanta Symphony Orchestra & Chorus in footage of the 1996 Olympic ceremonies. He died in 1999, in New Haven, Connecticut following a stroke, aged 82.

=== Influence ===
During his long career, Shaw drew attention to choral music and came to be considered the "dean" of American choral conductors, mentoring a number of younger conductors—including Jameson Marvin, Margaret Hillis, Maurice Casey, Ken Clinton, Donald Neuen, Ann Howard Jones, and current Atlanta Symphony Orchestra Chorus and Chamber Chorus director Norman Mackenzie — and inspiring thousands of singers with whom he worked around the United States. His work set new choral standards in the United States, and many of his recordings are considered benchmarks for choral singing.

Although his formative years and much of his work occurred before the rise of mainstream interest in informed historic performance practice, his recordings, reflecting his insistence that clearly projected texts serve as the foundation for musical interpretation, do not sound dated in comparison to more modern efforts by frequently smaller forces. He created techniques and approaches still in use today.

Shaw was a champion of modern music from the beginning of his career. He commissioned a requiem for Franklin D. Roosevelt from the newly naturalized German-born composer Paul Hindemith, who responded with When Lilacs Last in the Dooryard Bloom'd, a setting of Walt Whitman's poem commemorating the death of Abraham Lincoln. Shaw led the premiere of the work in 1946 with the Collegiate Chorale and continued to champion the work well into the last decade of his life; in 1996 he conducted a 50th anniversary performance at Yale University, where Hindemith was a professor when he wrote the work. In 1998 Yale also awarded Shaw an honorary doctorate. He was also a recipient of Yale's Sanford Medal. Shaw also received the University of Pennsylvania Glee Club Award of Merit in honor of his vast influence on male choral music. He was a National Patron of Delta Omicron, an international professional music fraternity, and was an honorary initiate of Phi Mu Alpha Sinfonia (Alpha Chi, University of Tulsa, 1945).

== Recordings ==
External audio
- You may hear Robert Shaw conducting Johann Sebastian Bach's Mass in B Minor with the RCA Victor Orchestra in 1947 Here on archive.org

Although noted in classical repertoire, Shaw hardly limited himself to that genre. The 104 recording credits on his discography also include recordings of sea shanties, glee club songs, sacred music and spirituals, musical theater numbers, Irish folk tunes, and, most notably, Christmas albums that have remained bestsellers ever since their release. Shaw was also noted for his many collaborations with Arturo Toscanini and the NBC Symphony Orchestra on several operatic and choral radio broadcasts and recordings. Under Shaw, the Atlanta Symphony Orchestra made its first recordings, beginning with a 2-LP album set titled Nativity in 1976, based on the annual Christmas concerts that Shaw performed in Atlanta beginning in 1970. For Telarc he recorded several digital remakes of the Christmas albums he had previously recorded for RCA Victor, including The Many Moods of Christmas. Shaw collaborated with noted choral composer and conductor Alice Parker (a former student of Shaw's at the Juilliard School) on arrangements of folksongs, hymns, spirituals, and Christmas music that remain popular with choruses today.

Shaw recorded for a variety of labels, beginning with a single record for American Decca and numerous releases on RCA Victor during the 78 rpm era. During the 1950s and 1960s, Shaw and his Chorale made many LP's for RCA Victor Red Seal Records. From 1977 onward, most of his recordings appeared on the Telarc label. For that company he led not only the Atlanta Symphony Orchestra and Chorus but also the Robert Shaw Chamber Singers, which drew its personnel largely from the Atlanta Symphony Chamber Chorus, and the Robert Shaw Festival Singers, a group assembled for Shaw's summer choral workshops in France. His last recording was for Telarc of Dvořák's Stabat Mater with the Atlanta Symphony Orchestra, chorus, and soloists.

Shaw recorded many of the great choral-orchestral works more than once, and his performances of Handel's Messiah, J.S. Bach's Mass in B minor, Beethoven's Missa Solemnis, Orff's Carmina Burana, Verdi's Requiem, and other similar masterworks remain highly regarded. In a move toward historically informed performance, Shaw's first recording of Messiah, in 1966, used a chorus of only thirty-one singers. In 2016, Shaw's recording of the Rachmaninoff's All-Night Vigil (Vespers), by the Robert Shaw Festival Singers, was added to the National Recording Registry of the Library of Congress.

== Awards ==
- 14 Grammy Awards
- 4 ASCAP Awards for service to contemporary music
- First Guggenheim Fellowship ever awarded to a conductor
- Alice M. Ditson Conductor's Award for Service to American Music
- George Peabody Medal for outstanding contributions to music in America
- Gold Baton Award of the American Symphony Orchestra League for "distinguished service to music and the arts,"
- American National Medal of Arts
- France's Officier des Arts et des Lettres
- England's Gramophone Award
- 1991 recipient of the Kennedy Center Honors

Preceded by Henry Sopkin	Music Directors, Atlanta Symphony Orchestra; 1967–1988	Succeeded by Yoel Levi
