= Dallas Winds =

Dallas-based concert band

- Wind ensemble
- Short name: DWS
- Founded: 1985; 40 years ago
- Location: Dallas, Texas, US
- Principal conductor: Jerry Junkin
- Website: dallaswinds.org

The Dallas Winds (also known as the Dallas Wind Symphony or DWS) is a professional concert band based in Dallas, Texas.

The Dallas Winds was founded in 1985 by Kim Campbell and Southern Methodist University music professor Howard Dunn. It was originally organized as a "reading band" to allow local professional freelance musicians (many of them music teachers and band directors) to play challenging wind ensemble music as they had in high school and college. The reading sessions led to performances, first at Southern Methodist University's Caruth Auditorium and then around the Dallas–Fort Worth area, with a formal concert season established at the Morton H. Meyerson Symphony Center in 1990.

After the death of Howard Dunn in 1991, the DWS launched an extensive national search for a new artistic director. Jerry Junkin, Director of Bands at the University of Texas at Austin, was named DWS Artistic Director and Conductor in 1993. Frederick Fennell served as Principal Guest Conductor from the mid-1990s until his death in 2004.

The Dallas Winds has released numerous high-fidelity recordings since 1991 in partnership with Reference Recording. Four albums have been nominated for Grammy Awards: Trittico (1994, Producer of the Year, Classical), Holidays and Epiphanies (1998, Producer of the Year, Classical), Garden of Dreams (2007, Best Engineered Album, Classical), and John Williams at the Movies (2019, Best Engineered Album, Classical).

Excerpts from DWS concerts are frequently heard on American Public Media's Performance Today show.

== Recordings ==
- The Brass and the Band (1988) with the Chicago Brass Quintet
- Plays Holst (1990)
- Fiesta! (1990)
- Fennell Favorites (1991)
- Trittico (1992)
- Testament (1992) with The Turtle Creek Chorale
- Pomp and Pipes (1993)
- Beachcomber (1994)
- Arnold for Band (1995)
- Holidays and Epiphanies... the music of Ron Nelson (1998)
- Marches I've Missed (1998)
- Strictly Sousa (2001)
- Garden of Dreams (2006)
- Midwest Clinic (2006)
- Crown Imperial (2007)
- Lincolnshire Posy (2008)
- Horns for the Holidays (2011)
- Playing with Fire (2011)
- Lassus Trombone (2012)
- Redshift: Music for Trumpet and Winds (2014)
- John Williams at the Movies (2018)
- Asphalt Cocktail: The Music of John Mackey (2019)
