= Tim Martyn =

American record producer

Tim Martyn is an American record producer and recording engineer specializing in classical music. He has won 6 Grammy Awards, including the Best Engineered Classical Album awards from the 56th and 61st awards seasons.

== Early years and education ==
Martyn studied piano, ear training and theory at the Juilliard School of Music Preparatory Division from age 8 until high school. He graduated high school at the Interlochen Arts Academy. He earned both Bachelor of Music and Master of Music degrees in Performance and Literature from the Juilliard School.

== Career ==
Martyn has worked with a number of performers such as cellist Yo-Yo Ma, pianists Yuja Wang and Daniil Trifonov, singers Renée Fleming and Roberto Alagna, and conductors Ricardo Muti and Andris Nelsons. He has produced and engineered recordings of a number of U.S. orchestras, including the Boston Symphony Orchestra and the Chicago Symphony Orchestra. Martyn founded Classic Sound Inc. in 1987 and Phoenix Audio LLC in 2001, classical music location recording and post-production facilities. Martyn was appointed Audio Director of the Boston Symphony Orchestra's Tanglewood Music Festival in 1985, a position he held for more than 35 seasons. In 2017, Martyn joined the Metropolitan Opera as Music Producer, and oversees several of the Met's Live in HD cinema productions each season, in addition to live radio broadcasts.

== Awards ==
- 2010 Grammy Award for Best Instrumental Soloist Performance (without orchestra) for Sharon Isbin's Journey to the New World
- 2010 Grammy Award for Best Instrumental Soloist Performance (with orchestra) for Prokofiev: Piano Concertos No. 2 and No. 3
- 2014 Grammy Award for Best Engineered Album, Classical for Winter Morning Walks
- 2014 Grammy Award for Best Classical Solo Vocal Album for Dawn Upshaw Winter Morning Walks
- 2019 Grammy Award for Best Engineered Album, Classical for Boston Symphony Orchestra Shostakovich: Symphonies Nos. 4 & 11
- 2019 Grammy Award for Best Orchestral Performance for Boston Symphony Orchestra Shostakovich: Symphonies Nos. 4 & 11

Nominations

- 2015 Grammy Award for Best Engineered Album, Classical for Riccardo Muti Conducts Mason Bates & Anna Clyne (Chicago Symphony Orchestra & Riccardo Muti)
- 2017 Grammy Award for Best Engineered Album, Classical for Shostakovich: Under Stalin's Shadow - Symphonies Nos. 5, 8 & 9: Andris Nelsons & the Boston Symphony Orchestra
- 2026 Grammy Award for Best Engineered Album, Classical for Shostakovich: Lady MacBeth of the Mtsensk District (Andris Nelsons, Boston Symphony Orchestra)
