= Jerry Junkin =

American conductor

- Born: August 2, 1956 (age 69)
- Education: University of Texas at Austin (B.M., M.M.)
- Occupation: Conductor

Jerry Junkin is an American conductor of wind bands and educator. Junkin serves on the faculty of the Butler School of Music at the University of Texas at Austin where he holds the Vincent R. and Jane D. DiNino Chair for the director of Bands. He conducts the University of Texas Wind Ensemble and instructs graduate as well as undergraduate conducting courses. Additionally, Junkin has served as the conductor of the Dallas Wind Symphony since 1993.

== Biography ==
Junkin was born in Victoria, Texas in 1956. His late father Fred Junkin was director of bands at Victoria High School, which influenced the young Junkin to pursue music. He attended Victoria High School from 1970 to 1974. After graduating from Victoria High School in 1974, he pursued a college education in music at The University of Texas at Austin. Immediately after graduating in 1978, he was named assistant director of bands.

Junkin became the conductor of the University of Texas at Austin Wind Ensemble in 1988 after being appointed director of bands at the University of South Florida. He was assistant director of bands at the University of Texas at Austin from 1978 to 1982, and later held a similar position at the University of Michigan. He has also been principal guest conductor of the Senzoku Gakuen College of Music Wind Symphony in Tokyo since 2007. Junkin has previously served as a president of the Big XII Band Director’s Association, a member of the board of directors of The John Philip Sousa Foundation, past-president of the American Bandmasters Association, and president of the College Band Directors National Association.

He currently serves as the Frank C. Erwin Centennial Professor of Music, conductor and music director of the wind ensemble, and head of the Conducting Division at the University of Texas at Austin. In addition, he also serves as the artistic director and conductor of the Dallas Wind Symphony, as well as music director and conductor of the Hong Kong Wind Philharmonia.

Performances under Junkin's direction have been praised by John Corigliano, David Del Tredici, Gunther Schuller, Karel Husa, William Kraft, Jacob Druckman and Michael Colgrass. Junkin has released more than 30 compact disc recordings for the Reference, Klavier, and Naxos labels. The New York Times named his release with the UT Wind Ensemble on the Reference Recordings label, Bells for Stokowski, one of the best classical CDs of that year. Their performance of Circus Maximus was recently released on the world’s first Blu-ray audio disc in 5.1 surround sound by Naxos. In 2014 he led The University of Texas Wind Ensemble on a four-week tour around the world. He also appeared with the UT Wind Ensemble in the 1992 and 2008 European Tours, the 2007 Festival Del Sole in Napa Valley, as well as two Carnegie Hall performances, nine TMEA Convention concerts, three ABA Convention performances and six CBDNA National Convention appearances.

Junkin is an advocate of public school music education, and has conducted All-State bands and festivals in forty-eight states and on five continents. He spends his summers in residence at the Interlochen Arts Camp in Michigan, as well as appearing at music festivals throughout the world. Junkin has served as President of the Big XII Band Director's Association and is a member of the Board of Directors of The John Philip Sousa Foundation, is Past-President of the American Bandmasters Association, and Past-President of the College Band Directors National Association. He makes regular guest appearances with the Tokyo Kosei Wind Orchestra and the Taipei Symphonic Winds, and he has conducted throughout the United States, as well as in Japan, China, and Europe.

== Achievements and awards ==
Junkin has received praise from a number of notable musicians and composers, such as John Corigliano, David Del Tredici, Gunther Schuller, Karel Husa, William Kraft, Jacob Druckman and Michael Colgrass.

In 2005, Junkin led the world premiere of John Corigliano's Symphony No. 3 Circus Maximus at Carnegie Hall, which later was later released as the first ever Blu-Ray audio disc and was nominated for a Grammy.

Junkin has won a number of awards for both conducting and teaching:

- The Grainger Medallion from the International Percy Grainger Society in 2005 for his representation of several of Percy Grainger's works
- Kappa Kappa Psi Distinguished Service to music Award in 2009
- 2012 Texas Bandmaster of the Year
- 2017 Phi Beta Mu Outstanding Bandmaster
- The Medal of Honor from the Midwest International Band and Orchestra Clinic
- Texas Excellence in Teaching Award
- The Outstanding Young Texas-Ex Award
