= Norman Mackenzie (conductor) =

Norman Mackenzie is the multiple Grammy Award winning director of the Atlanta Symphony Orchestra Chorus and Chamber Chorus.

== Musical career ==
Mackenzie was a prodigal musician as a pianist and organist. At 12 years old he joined the Philadelphia Orchestra (one of the "Big Five" American orchestras) and, at the age of 16, was the youngest finalist in the National Young Artist Competition of the American Guild of Organists. He subsequently earned a master's degree from the Westminster Choir College. Mackenzie's organ recitals are still featured on NPR's "Performance Today".

As a 15 year old organist for a Philadelphia church, his interest in choral music was sparked from his work with the choir. Mackenzie later served for 14 years as the apprentice for the conductor and famous choral director, Robert Shaw, at the Atlanta Symphony Orchestra and Chorus, finally taking over in 2000 as director of the Symphony's Chorus and its Chamber Chorus. Mackenzie is apparently very well-liked and popular among all of his choirs as one who inspires, and he is considered to be one of the best chorus directors of all time as evidenced by his multiple awards.

Along with being the director of the choruses for the Atlanta Symphony Orchestra, Mackenzie is the Director of Music at Trinity Presbyterian Church in Atlanta. He is the organist, director of the chancel choir, and director of the youth choir at Trinity.

== Awards ==
Mackenzie holds The Frannie and Bill Graves Chair as Director of Choruses for the Atlanta Symphony Orchestra. He has won Grammy Awards for the Atlanta Symphony Orchestra and Chorus performances of Vaughn William's A Sea Symphony, Berlioz' Requiem, and others including with Robert Spano conducting. He has received numerous other Grammy nominations for his choruses.
