= Cantus (vocal ensemble) =

American a cappella vocal ensemble

Cantus is an eight-member low-voice a cappella ensemble based in Minneapolis, Minnesota, United States.

== Biography ==
The low-voice ensemble Cantus is known for its trademark warmth and blend, innovative programming and performances of music ranging from the Renaissance to the 21st century.

The vocal group maintains a schedule of around 80 live concert performances and 30-40 education/outreach activities in a given season, both in the United States of America and abroad. Cantus is an active proponent of music education, encouraging people of all ages to sing. The ensemble has worked with tens of thousands of singers throughout the country in educational activities ranging from master classes to festivals and collaborations. New members are acquired through annual national auditions. The ensemble began as a student-run organization at St. Olaf College in 1995. After a successful northeast tour in the summer of 1998, Cantus transitioned into a professional ensemble and non-profit organization by 1999, based out of Minneapolis, MN.

== Notability ==
Cantus is the only full-time, artist-led vocal ensemble in the United States, and is one of two professional classical male vocal ensembles in the United States that pays its artists full-time salaries, while maintaining a year-round schedule of performances, the other being San Francisco's Chanticleer.

Additionally, Cantus embraces narrative programming, and its concerts have themes that explore such topics as homelessness, environmental conservation, isolation in the digital age, the sacrifices of military families, toxic masculinity, Alzheimer's and other dementias, and many more topics. This is achieved through music and spoken word.

The ensemble received the 2009 Chorus America Margaret Hillis Award, the first collaborative ensemble to do so. The ensemble's regular work with students nationwide also garnered Chorus America's Education Outreach Award in 2011. In 2023, Cantus received the Alice Parker Fund award for its work presenting works that incorporate Black and Latino traditions from Chorus America. Cantus was selected by Minnesota Public Radio to be Artists in Residence for the 2010–11 season. The residency included supported touring, radio co-hosting, and international broadcasts via Performance Today. Cantus continues to have a vibrant relationship with Minnesota Public Radio, most recently having a nationally syndicated special called Giving Thanks in November 2024.

In recent seasons, Cantus has collaborated with The Swingles (2025), Canadian Brass (2024), Cantus of Norway (2023), Chanticleer (2022 & 2016), Lorelei (2018), Sweet Honey in the Rock (2017), the Saint Paul Chamber Orchestra, Boston Pops, and on A Prairie Home Companion with Garrison Keillor. 2014 marked the final year of the group's critically acclaimed collaboration with Theater Latte Da, All Is Calm: The Christmas Truce of 1914, which tells the true story of the Christmas Truce of 1914, when World War I soldiers set down their arms to celebrate the holidays with the enemy.

== Current members and Artistic Co-Directors ==
- Jacob Christopher (2016), tenor
- Alexander Nishibun (2019), tenor
- Paul Scholtz (2015), tenor
- Paul John Rudoi (2008–2016, 2023), tenor
- Rod Kelly Hines (2021), baritone
- Jeremy Wong (2021), baritone
- Chris Foss (2008), bass
- Samuel Bohlander-Green (2013), bass

== Recordings ==
Cantus has released numerous critically acclaimed recordings, most of which were recorded by noted engineer and Stereophile Magazine Editor, John Atkinson. The group's 2010, 2011, and 2012 releases That Eternal Day, Christmas with Cantus, and On the Shoulders of Giants brought in the Grammy Award-winning production team of Steve Barnett and Preston Smith for recording, engineering, and mastering. Since 2021, Cantus has released albums on the Signum Classics label.

- Alone Together (2025)
- Into the Light (2023)
- Covers Live (2022) (digital only)
- The COVID-19 Sessions (2022)
- Manifesto (2021)
- A Harvest Home (2014)
- Song of a Czech (2013)
- On the Shoulders of Giants (2012)
- Christmas with Cantus (2011)
- That Eternal Day (2010)
- Outside the Box (Limited Release) (2009)
- All Is Calm: The Christmas Truce of 1914 (2008)
- While You Are Alive (2008)
- Cantus (2007)
- There Lies the Home (2006)
- Cantus Live: Vol. 2 (2006)
- Comfort and Joy: Volume Two (2005)
- Comfort and Joy: Volume One (2004)
- Cantus Live: Vol. 1 (2004)
- Deep River (2003)
- "...against the dying of the light" (2002)
- Let Your Voice Be Heard (2001)

=== Student recordings ===
- Vagabond (1999 - Student Recording)
- Tidings (1998 - Student Recording)
- Introit (1997 - Student Recording)
