= Paul Goodman (sound engineer) =

American audio engineer

Paul Goodman is a Grammy Award-winning sound engineer, with awards in 1983 for Mahler: Symphony No. 7 in E Minor (Song of the Night), in 1985 for Prokofiev: Symphony No. 5 in B Flat, Op. 100, and in 1987 for Horowitz - The Studio Recordings, New York 1985. In addition to classical music, he has also worked on notable jazz albums, including the avant-garde jazz album Communications, performed by Jazz Composer's Orchestra and 1974's Musique du Bois, by Phil Woods.

Raised in Newark, New Jersey, Goodman graduated from Weequahic High School in 1945.
