= Edward (Bud) T. Graham =

American classical recording engineer

Edward (Bud) Thomas Graham (September 21, 1927 - November 9, 2003) was born in Hackensack, New Jersey. He was the fourth and youngest child of Cecilia (Brown) and John Graham.

Graham was employed as a classical recording engineer by CBS Records / Sony Classical for 45 years. Over the course of his career, he received six Grammy Awards and recorded many of the world's most renowned musicians and orchestras.

He married June (Lee) Graham on May 7, 1970 and had two daughters, Catherine (b. 1972) and Jennifer (b.1974).
