= Telarc International Corporation =

American independent record label

- Parent company: BMG Rights Management
- Founded: 1977
- Founder: Jack Renner; Robert Woods
- Genre: Classical, blues, jazz
- Country of origin: U.S.
- Location: Cleveland, Ohio
- Official website: www.concordmusicgroup.com/labels/telarc/

Telarc International Corporation is an American audiophile independent record label founded in 1977 by two classically trained musicians and former teachers, Jack Renner and Robert Woods. Based in Cleveland, Ohio, the label has had a long association with the Cincinnati Symphony Orchestra and the Cleveland Orchestra, as well as with the Atlanta Symphony Orchestra and the St. Louis Symphony Orchestra. Although it started as a classical music label, Telarc has released jazz, blues and country music recordings.

In 1996, Telarc merged with another independent label, Heads Up, which is now a subsidiary of Telarc. In late 2005, both Telarc and Heads Up were bought by Concord Records. Today, both labels operate as semi-autonomous units of BMG Rights Management

== The Telarc Sound ==
Telarc is noted for the high quality of its recordings, encapsulated in the slogan "The Telarc Sound". Its 1979 high-definition digital recording of Tchaikovsky's 1812 Overture (the first ever) became a popular way for people to test the quality of their record-playing equipment and audio setups, as only high-quality and properly-tuned systems could play the hi-fi digital cannon shots properly. The record ultimately became their best-selling ever and established them as a company. Its audio engineers are highly regarded in the recording business and have led Telarc to over 50 Grammy Awards on its label and two others it distributes, Heads Up and MCG. In 2004, it received the "Label of the Year" award from Gramophone magazine. Telarc was one of the first labels to record music with a 20-bit analogue-to-digital converter (ADC) in the late 1980s and has used 24-bit formats since 1996.

== Staff reduction ==
In February 2009, due to corporate restructuring at Concord Music Group, Telarc announced it would cut twenty-six jobs and that it would also stop producing its recordings. These job cuts included the highly regarded, multi-award-winning production team. Telarc's founder and former president, Robert Woods resigned in March 2009 and was replaced by Heads Up president Dave Love. Love was let go the following month. Five/Four Productions was formed by four members of the Telarc production team: Grammy award-winning engineers Michael Bishop and Robert Friedrich, Grammy award-winning producer Thomas Moore, and chief technician Bill McKinney.

== Keeping the Blues Alive Award ==
In 2013, the Blues Foundation honored Telarc with its 2013 Keeping the Blues Alive (KBA) Award. The KBA ceremony was held in conjunction with the 29th International Blues Challenge (IBC).
