= David Miles Huber =

American composer and producer

- Occupations: American composer and Record Producer
- Known for: Modern Recording Techniques
- Style: Ambient, Downtempo, Dance
- Website: https://www.davidmileshuber.com/

David Miles Huber is an American composer and producer in the downtempo, ambient and dance genres. He is also the author of numerous books on recording and electronic music. Huber's CD series Relaxation and Meditation with Music and Nature has sold over one million copies. His latest music and collaborations are available through the 51bpm independent record label. Huber's most prominent book, Modern Recording Techniques, has sold over 250,000 copies and become a standard recording industry text.

Huber received his degree in music technology from Indiana University (I.M.P.)I.M.P., and was the first American to be admitted into the Tonmeister program at the University of Surrey in Guildford, Surrey, England.

== Selected discography ==
- Colabs (2008), 51bm.com llc - 51bpm-005CD (stereo CD) - one CD
- Colabs (2008), 51bm.com llc - 51bpm-008dtsCD (surround dts CD) - one surround dts CD
- Relaxation and Meditation with Music and Nature (1993), Delta Music - two 5-CD sets
- Between the Sea & the Sky (1996), Delta Music - 5-CD box set
- Roads (1979), 51bpm.com llc - 51bpm-001DL (stereo download)
- Chamberland (2012), 51bm.com llc Nominated for Best Surround Sound Album (55th Annual Grammy Awards Winner 2013)

== Selected bibliography ==
- Audio Production Techniques for Video. H.W. Sams, 1987.
- Microphone Manual: Design and Application. H.W. Sams, 1988.
- Random Access Audio. SAMS Pub., 1992.
- Hard Disk Recording for Musicians. Music Sales Corp, 1995.
- Professional Microphone Techniques (with Philip Williams). Thomson Course Technology, 1998.
- Modern Recording Techniques (with Robert E. Runstein). Seventh edition, Elsevier, 2010.
- The MIDI Manual: A Practical Guide to MIDI in the Project Studio. Third edition, Elsevier, 2007.
