= Jack Renner (sound engineer) =

American recording engineer (1935–2019)

- Birth name: Jack Lee Renner
- Born: April 13, 1935; Barnesville, Ohio, U.S.
- Died: June 19, 2019 (aged 84); Portsmouth, Rhode Island, U.S.
- Occupation(s): Recording engineer, record label executive

Jack Lee Renner (April 13, 1935 – June 19, 2019) was an American classically trained musician and recording engineer, best known as chairman, CEO and chief recording engineer of the Telarc International Corporation.

Renner received a Bachelor of Science degree in Music Education and completed graduate work at Ohio State University in Columbus, Ohio. He has worked as a professional trumpeter, recording engineering consultant, freelance recording engineer, high school music teacher and public speaker. Renner has received 20 Grammy Award nominations, winning eleven.

Renner made his first recording on February 20, 1962. He pioneered the development of the digital recording process for jazz, classical and symphonic music. In 1978, he made the first symphonic digital recording and the first orchestral digital recording in the United States.

Renner held an Honorary Doctor of Musical Arts degree from the Cleveland Institute of Music.

On June 20, 2019, former Telarc engineer Michael Bishop announced that Renner had died following an extended battle with cancer.
