= Marianne Thorsen =

Norwegian violinist (born 1972)

Marianne Thorsen (born 13 March 1972) is a Norwegian violinist.

== Biography and career ==
Born in Trondheim, Thorsen was taught by Bjarne Fiskum before studying at The Purcell School for Young Musicians in Hertfordshire, and later tutored by György Pauk at the Royal Academy of Music in London, where she won the Roth Prize and the Academy's highest award for performance, the DipRAM.

In 1991 she founded the Leopold String Trio, subsequently leading it for 15 years. It toured extensively, playing at Carnegie Hall, New York, the Musikverein in Vienna, and the Concertgebouw in Amsterdam. She led the Nash Ensemble from 2000 to 2015.

She won first prize at the Sion International Violin Competition in Switzerland in 2003, returning to her birth place three years later when she was recruited as a professor in the Norwegian University of Science and Technology's Music Department.
