= Trondheim Soloists =

Musical chamber ensemble

Trondheim Soloists Trondheimsolistene
- Origin: Trondheim, Norway
- Genres: Chamber music
- Website: trondheimsolistene.no

Trondheim Soloists (Norwegian: Trondheimsolistene) are a musical chamber ensemble of string players based in Trondheim, Norway. The ensemble was founded in 1988.

== Recordings ==
Cellist Øyvind Gimse was appointed as artistic director in 2002.

Their performing style has been described as a hybrid between modern techniques and period ideas: they use baroque bows but on metal stringed instruments.

== Collaborations ==
Trondheim Soloists collaborates regularly with professional soloists such as Saskia Giorgini, Ben Caplan, Leif Ove Andsnes, Martin Fröst, Joshua Bell, Ole Edvard Antonsen, Mari Samuelsen and Arve Tellefsen. Trondheim Soloists are perhaps mostly known for their extensive collaboration with German classical violinist Anne-Sophie Mutter. This collaboration has resulted in recordings of pieces by Vivaldi (Deutsche Grammophon, 1999) and Bach (Deutsche Grammophon, 2008). The Bach album made its debut on the Billboard "Top Classical Albums" chart in the No. 1 position in October 2008, and remained in the top five for five weeks. The collaboration with Mutter has also included touring. In November 2001, the Trondheim Soloists made their Carnegie Hall debut alongside Mutter

== Awards ==
- 2006, 2010, 2016 Spellemannprisen
- Three Grammy nominations

== Selected discography ==
- 1999: Vivaldi: The Four Seasons (Deutsche Grammophon), with Anne-Sophie Mutter OCLC 939129657
- 2001: Trondheimsolistene (Universal Music) OCLC 1444510529
- 2006: Mozart: Violin Concertos (2L), with Marianne Thorsen OCLC 611346349
- 2008: Gubaidulina In Tempus Praesens (Deutsche Grammophon), with Anne-Sophie Mutter OCLC 316059492
- 2008: Divertimenti (2L) OCLC 871990398
- 2012: Souvenir – Part I & II (2L) OCLC 898583928, 898584467
- 2014: Magnificat (2L), OCLC 913863477
- 2016: Reflections (2L) OCLC 8050986124
- 2018: Transfigured Night (PENTATONE PTC 5186717), with Alisa Weilerstein OCLC 1082266998
