= Fred Plaut =

German record producer (1907–1985)

Frederick Plaut (1907–1985) was a recording engineer and amateur photographer. He was employed by Columbia Records in the US during the 1940s, 1950s, and 1960s, eventually becoming the label's chief engineer. Plaut engineered sessions for what would result in many of Columbia's famous albums, including the original cast recordings of South Pacific, My Fair Lady, and West Side Story, jazz LPs Kind of Blue and Sketches of Spain by Miles Davis, Time Out by Dave Brubeck, Mingus Ah Um and Mingus Dynasty by Charles Mingus.

== Early life ==
Frederick ("Fred") Plaut was born in Munich, Germany, on May 12, 1907. He graduated from the Technical University of Munich with a degree in electrical engineering. From 1933 to 1940, Plaut lived in Paris, where he founded and operated his own recording studio. At the same time, he worked as a consulting engineer for Polydor Records, where he designed and built a complete recording installation.

In Paris, Fred Plaut met his future wife, Rose Kanter, a Polish-American soprano pursuing vocal studies in France. They were married on September 24, 1938. She performed in France, England, Belgium, the Netherlands, and Italy, returning to the United States in June 1940, just as Paris was falling into Nazi hands. She continued her singing career in the United States under the name Rose Dercourt, making her American debut at Town Hall in April 1944. She was a close friend of Francis Poulenc, who dedicated some of his songs to her and maintained a steady correspondence with her until his death in 1963.

== Engineer for Columbia Records ==
Fred Plaut came to the United States in January 1940 and in April of that same year began his career as a recording engineer with Columbia Records. He recorded the majority of the Columbia Masterworks series and many sessions of the Philadelphia, Cleveland, Chicago, Minneapolis, Louisville, and New York orchestras. He recorded almost all of the cast albums of Broadway shows, operas, and dramatic plays for Columbia and other labels. Plaut also recorded many chamber music and solo performances, as well as popular and jazz sessions. His work took place in the Columbia recording studios and on location at such events as the Newport Jazz Festival and the Marlboro Festival. He received five Grammy Awards and six nominations for engineering.

While still with Columbia Records, Plaut gave several extension courses in The Art of Recording for the Manhattan School of Music. After his retirement from Columbia in 1972, Plaut joined the staff of the Yale School of Music as consultant and Senior Recording Engineer and in 1977 began teaching classes in the Art of Recording. In 1975, Plaut taught Music in Modern Media at Columbia University.

== Photography ==
Plaut's second career was as a photographer. His work as a recording engineer for Columbia Records allowed him many opportunities to photograph recording artists in the studios and on location while they were relaxing, performing, or listening to playback of recording sessions. The result is thousands of candid portraits of the great conductors, orchestras, soloists, chamber players, popular and jazz musicians, actors, and writers. Some of these artists include Samuel Barber, Leonard Bernstein, the Budapest String Quartet, Pablo Casals, Aaron Copland, Zino Francescatti, Glenn Gould, Mieczyslaw Horszowski, the Juilliard String Quartet, Dimitri Mitropoulos, Eugene Ormandy, Richard Rodgers, Alexander Schneider, Rudolf Serkin, Isaac Stern, Igor Stravinsky, George Szell, Joseph Szigeti, Edgard Varèse, and Bruno Walter.

Fred and Rose Plaut were in the mainstream of New York City's musical life. They frequently attended or hosted dinner parties. The Plaut penthouse received such guests as Ned Rorem, Virgil Thomson, Henri Sauguet, Carlos Surinach, Igor Stravinsky, George Balanchine, Edgard Varèse, and Vittorio Rieti. These social occasions also allowed Plaut to take many candid photographs.

Fred Plaut also took many candid photographs on his frequent vacations with Rose to such countries as France, Italy, Spain, India, Mexico, and Israel. These photos included not only typical tourist's pictures, but also the famous personalities they encountered. The travel photos include candid portraits of Francis Poulenc, Pierre Bernac, Alberto Moravia, Pablo Picasso, Eugene Berman, and Janet Flanner.

Plaut also had opportunities to take posed portraits of artists for publicity purposes. His photos have been used for brochures, flyers, posters, and concert programs by the Juilliard String Quartet, the Kalichstein-Laredo-Robinson Trio, the Albaneri Trio, Bethany Beardslee, Lehman Engel, and Ettore Stratta.

Plaut's photographs have been exhibited at several museums, including seven exhibits at the Museum of Modern Art in New York City, and have appeared in numerous major American and foreign magazines. Many book illustrations, book covers, and some eighty record album covers are to his credit. In a departure from his music imagery, it was his charming photograph of a stout Frenchman in slippers playing draughts on a street bench against an opponent who is a young girl that was chosen by Edward Steichen for The Family of Man who curated the record-breaking MoMA show in 1955 which toured the world to be seen by 9 million visitors. A selection of Plaut photographs was published as "The Unguarded Moment: A Photographic Interpretation" (Englewood Cliffs, N.J.: Prentice-Hall, c1964). This contains over one hundred of his finest portraits, as well as short biographical sketches of the subjects.
