= 60th Annual Grammy Awards =

2018 US music awards ceremony

- Official poster
- Date: January 28, 2018; 7:30–11:00 p.m. EST
- Location: Madison Square Garden; New York City, New York
- Hosted by: James Corden

Highlights
- Most awards: Bruno Mars (6)
- Most nominations: Jay-Z (8)
- Website: https://www.grammy.com/awards/60th-annual-grammy-awards-2017

Television/radio coverage
- Network: CBS
- Viewership: 19.8 million

The 60th Annual Grammy Awards ceremony was held on January 28, 2018. The CBS network broadcast the show live from Madison Square Garden in New York City. The show was moved to January to avoid coinciding with the 2018 Winter Olympics in Pyeongchang, as was the case in 2010 and 2014. James Corden returned as host.

The ceremony recognizes the best recordings, compositions and artists of the eligibility year, which ran from October 1, 2016, to September 30, 2017. The "pre-telecast" ceremony (officially named The Premiere Ceremony) was held on the same day prior to the main ceremony.

The nominations were announced on November 28, 2017 with Jay-Z leading the nomination with eight, followed by Kendrick Lamar with seven. Bruno Mars won all his six nominations, becoming the eighth artist who have won Album, Record, and Song of the Year in one night. Canadian singer Alessia Cara won for Best New Artist.

== Performers ==
=== Premiere ceremony ===
Artist(s)	Song(s)
India Arie	"I Am Light"
Stile Antico	"Ave Maria" "Gaudete in Domino"
Jazzmeia Horn	Tribute to Jon Hendricks: "Moanin'"
Taj Mahal; Keb' Mo'	"Diving Duck Blues"
Body Count	"Black Hoodie"

=== Main ceremony ===
Artist(s)	Song(s)
Kendrick Lamar; U2; Dave Chappelle	"XXX" "DNA" "Big Shot" "New Freezer" "King's Dead"
Lady Gaga; Mark Ronson	"Joanne" "Million Reasons"
Sam Smith	"Pray"
Little Big Town	"Better Man"
Jon Batiste; Gary Clark Jr. Joe Saylor	Tribute to Fats Domino and Chuck Berry: "Ain't That a Shame" "Maybellene"
Luis Fonsi; Daddy Yankee; Zuleyka Rivera	"Despacito"
Childish Gambino JD McCrary	"Terrified"
Pink	"Wild Hearts Can't Be Broken"
Bruno Mars; Cardi B	"Finesse" (with elements of "Gett Off", "Jump Around" and "Bartier Cardi")
Sting; Shaggy	"Englishman in New York" "Don't Make Me Wait"
DJ Khaled; Rihanna; Bryson Tiller	"Wild Thoughts"
Eric Church; Maren Morris; Brothers Osborne	Tribute to the victims of the 2017 Las Vegas shooting and Manchester Arena bombing: "Tears in Heaven"
Kesha; Camila Cabello; Cyndi Lauper; Julia Michaels; Andra Day; Bebe Rexha	"Praying"
U2	"Get Out of Your Own Way"
Elton John; Miley Cyrus	"Tiny Dancer"
Ben Platt	Tribute to Leonard Bernstein: "Somewhere"
Patti LuPone	Tribute to Andrew Lloyd Webber: "Don't Cry for Me Argentina"
SZA	"Broken Clocks"
Chris Stapleton; Emmylou Harris	Tribute to Tom Petty: "Wildflowers"
Logic; Alessia Cara; Khalid	Tribute to Chris Cornell and Chester Bennington: "1-800-273-8255"

== Presenters ==
- John Legend and Tony Bennett – presented Best Rap/Sung Performance
- Kelly Clarkson and Nick Jonas – presented Best New Artist
- Jim Gaffigan – introduced Little Big Town
- Jon Batiste, Gary Clark Jr., and Joe Saylor – presented Best Pop Solo Performance
- Sarah Silverman and Victor Cruz – introduced Luis Fonsi, Daddy Yankee and Zuleyka Rivera
- Dave Chappelle – presented Best Rap Album
- Katie Holmes – introduced Bruno Mars and Cardi B
- Trevor Noah – presenting Best Comedy Album
- Donnie Wahlberg and Hailee Steinfeld – presenting Best Country Album
- Janelle Monáe – introduced Kesha, Camila Cabello, Cyndi Lauper, Julia Michaels, Andra Day and Bebe Rexha
- Camila Cabello – introduced U2
- Sting – presenting Song of the Year
- Anna Kendrick – introduced Elton John and Miley Cyrus
- Shemar Moore and Eve – introduced SZA
- Alicia Keys – presenting Record of the Year
- U2 – presenting Album of the Year

== Nominations and winners ==
Nominees list adapted from the Recording Academy's website.

=== General ===
Record of the Year

- "24K Magic" – Bruno Mars
  - Shampoo Press & Curl, producers; Serban Ghenea, John Hanes & Charles Moniz, engineers/mixers; Tom Coyne, mastering engineer
- "Redbone" – Childish Gambino
  - Donald Glover & Ludwig Goransson, producers; Donald Glover, Ludwig Goransson, Riley Mackin & Ruben Rivera, engineers/mixers; Bernie Grundman, mastering engineer
- "Despacito" – Luis Fonsi and Daddy Yankee featuring Justin Bieber
  - Josh Gudwin, Mauricio Rengifo & Andrés Torres, producers; Josh Gudwin & Jaycen Joshua, Chris "TEK" O’Ryan, Mauricio Rengifo, Juan G Rivera "Gaby Music", Luis "Salda" Saldarriaga & Andrés Torres, engineers/mixers; Dave Kutch, mastering engineer
- "The Story of O.J." – Jay-Z
  - Jay-Z & No I.D., producers; Jimmy Douglass & Gimel "Young Guru" Keaton, engineers/mixers; Dave Kutch, mastering engineer
- "Humble" – Kendrick Lamar
  - Asheton Hogan & Mike Will Made It, producers; Derek "MixedByAli" Ali, James Hunt & Matt Schaeffer, engineers/mixers; Mike Bozzi, mastering engineer

Album of the Year

- 24K Magic – Bruno Mars
  - Shampoo Press & Curl, producers; Serban Ghenea, John Hanes & Charles Moniz, engineers/mixers; Christopher Brody Brown, James Fauntleroy, Philip Lawrence & Bruno Mars, songwriters; Tom Coyne, mastering engineer
- "Awaken, My Love!" – Childish Gambino
  - Donald Glover & Ludwig Goransson, producers; Bryan Carrigan, Chris Fogel, Donald Glover, Ludwig Goransson, Riley Mackin & Ruben Rivera, engineers/mixers; Donald Glover & Ludwig Goransson, songwriters; Bernie Grundman, mastering engineer
- 4:44 – Jay-Z
  - Jay-Z & No I.D., producers; Jimmy Douglass & Gimel "Young Guru" Keaton, engineers/mixers; Shawn Carter & Dion Wilson, songwriters; Dave Kutch, mastering engineer
- Damn – Kendrick Lamar
  - DJ Dahi, Sounwave & Anthony Tiffith, producers; Derek "MixedByAli" Ali, James Hunt & Matt Schaeffer, engineers/mixers; K. Duckworth, D. Natche, M. Spears & A. Tiffith, songwriters; Mike Bozzi, mastering engineer
- Melodrama – Lorde
  - Jack Antonoff & Lorde, producers; Serban Ghenea, John Hanes & Laura Sisk, engineers/mixers; Jack Antonoff & Ella Yelich-O'Connor, songwriters; Randy Merrill, mastering engineer

Song of the Year

- "That's What I Like"
  - Christopher Brody Brown, James Fauntleroy, Philip Lawrence, Bruno Mars, Ray Charles McCullough II, Jeremy Reeves, Ray Romulus & Jonathan Yip, songwriters (Bruno Mars)
- "Despacito"
  - Ramón Ayala Rodriguez, Justin Bieber, Jason Boyd, Erika Ender, Luis Fonsi & Marty James Garton Jr., songwriters (Luis Fonsi & Daddy Yankee featuring Justin Bieber)
- "4:44"
  - Shawn Carter & Dion Wilson, songwriters (Jay-Z)
- "Issues"
  - Benjamin Levin, Mikkel Storleer Eriksen, Tor Erik Hermansen, Julia Michaels & Justin Drew Tranter, songwriters (Julia Michaels)
- "1-800-273-8255"
  - Alessia Caracciolo, Sir Robert Bryson Hall II, Arjun Ivatury, Khalid Robinson & Andrew Taggart, songwriters (Logic featuring Alessia Cara & Khalid)

Best New Artist

- Alessia Cara
- Khalid
- Lil Uzi Vert
- Julia Michaels
- SZA

=== Pop ===
Best Pop Solo Performance

- "Shape of You" – Ed Sheeran
- "Love So Soft" – Kelly Clarkson
- "Praying" – Kesha
- "Million Reasons" – Lady Gaga
- "What About Us" – Pink

Best Pop Duo/Group Performance

- "Feel It Still" – Portugal. The Man
- "Something Just like This" – The Chainsmokers and Coldplay
- "Despacito" – Luis Fonsi and Daddy Yankee featuring Justin Bieber
- "Thunder" – Imagine Dragons
- "Stay" – Zedd and Alessia Cara

Best Traditional Pop Vocal Album

- Tony Bennett Celebrates 90 – Dae Bennett, producer (various artists)
- Nobody but Me (deluxe version) – Michael Bublé
- Triplicate – Bob Dylan
- In Full Swing – Seth MacFarlane
- Wonderland – Sarah McLachlan

Best Pop Vocal Album

- ÷ – Ed Sheeran
- Kaleidoscope EP – Coldplay
- Lust for Life – Lana Del Rey
- Evolve – Imagine Dragons
- Rainbow – Kesha
- Joanne – Lady Gaga

=== Dance/electronic music ===
Best Dance Recording

- "Tonite" – LCD Soundsystem
  - James Murphy, producer; James Murphy, mixer
- "Bambro Koyo Ganda" – Bonobo featuring Innov Gnawa
  - Bonobo, producer; Bonobo, mixer
- "Cola" – CamelPhat & Elderbrook
  - CamelPhat & Elderbrook, producers; CamelPhat, mixer
- "Andromeda" – Gorillaz featuring DRAM
  - Damon Albarn, Jamie Hewlett, Remi Kabaka & Anthony Khan, producers; Stephen Sedgwick, mixer
- "Line of Sight" – Odesza featuring WYNNE & Mansionair
  - Clayton Knight & Harrison Mills, producers; Eric J Dubowsky, mixer

Best Dance/Electronic Album

- 3-D The Catalogue – Kraftwerk
- Migration – Bonobo
- Mura Masa – Mura Masa
- A Moment Apart – Odesza
- What Now – Sylvan Esso

=== Contemporary instrumental music ===
Best Contemporary Instrumental Album

- Prototype – Jeff Lorber Fusion
- What If – The Jerry Douglas Band
- Spirit – Alex Han
- Mount Royal – Julian Lage and Chris Eldridge
- Bad Hombre – Antonio Sanchez

=== Rock ===
Best Rock Performance

- "You Want It Darker" – Leonard Cohen
- "The Promise" – Chris Cornell
- "Run" – Foo Fighters
- "No Good" – Kaleo
- "Go to War" – Nothing More

Best Metal Performance

- "Sultan's Curse" – Mastodon
- "Invisible Enemy" – August Burns Red
- "Black Hoodie" – Body Count
- "Forever" – Code Orange
- "Clockworks" – Meshuggah

Best Rock Song

- "Run"
  - Foo Fighters, songwriters (Foo Fighters)
- "Atlas, Rise!"
  - James Hetfield and Lars Ulrich, songwriters (Metallica)
- "Blood in the Cut"
  - JT Daly and Kristine Flaherty, songwriters (K.Flay)
- "Go to War"
  - Ben Anderson, Jonny Hawkins, Will Hoffman, Daniel Oliver, David Pramik & Mark Vollelunga, songwriters (Nothing More)
- "The Stage"
  - Zachary Baker, Brian Haner, Matthew Sanders, Jonathan Seward & Brooks Wackerman, songwriters (Avenged Sevenfold)

Best Rock Album

- A Deeper Understanding – The War on Drugs
- Emperor of Sand – Mastodon
- Hardwired... to Self-Destruct – Metallica
- The Stories We Tell Ourselves – Nothing More
- Villains – Queens of the Stone Age

=== Alternative ===
Best Alternative Music Album

- Sleep Well Beast – The National
- Everything Now – Arcade Fire
- Humanz – Gorillaz
- American Dream – LCD Soundsystem
- Pure Comedy – Father John Misty

=== R&B ===
Best R&B Performance

- "That's What I Like" – Bruno Mars
- "Get You" – Daniel Caesar featuring Kali Uchis
- "Distraction" – Kehlani
- "High" – Ledisi
- "The Weekend" – SZA

Best Traditional R&B Performance

- "Redbone" – Childish Gambino
- "Laugh and Move On" – The Baylor Project
- "What I'm Feelin'" – Anthony Hamilton featuring The Hamiltones
- "All the Way" – Ledisi
- "Still" – Mali Music

Best R&B Song

- "That's What I Like"
  - Christopher Brody Brown, James Fauntleroy, Philip Lawrence, Bruno Mars, Ray Charles McCullough II, Jeremy Reeves, Ray Romulus & Jonathan Yip, songwriters (Bruno Mars)
- "First Began"
  - PJ Morton, songwriter (PJ Morton)
- "Location"
  - Alfredo Gonzalez, Olatunji Ige, Samuel David Jiminez, Christopher McClenney, Khalid Robinson & Joshua Scruggs, songwriters (Khalid)
- "Redbone"
  - Donald Glover & Ludwig Goransson, songwriters (Childish Gambino)
- "Supermodel"
  - Tyran Donaldson, Terrence Henderson, Greg Landfair Jr., Carter Lang & Solana Rowe, songwriters (SZA)

Best Urban Contemporary Album

- Starboy – The Weeknd
- Free 6lack – 6lack
- "Awaken, My Love!" – Childish Gambino
- American Teen – Khalid
- Ctrl – SZA

Best R&B Album

- 24K Magic – Bruno Mars
- Freudian – Daniel Caesar
- Let Love Rule – Ledisi
- Gumbo – PJ Morton
- Feel the Real – Musiq Soulchild

=== Rap ===
Best Rap Performance

- "Humble" – Kendrick Lamar
- "Bounce Back" – Big Sean
- "Bodak Yellow" – Cardi B
- "4:44" – Jay-Z
- "Bad and Boujee" – Migos featuring Lil Uzi Vert

Best Rap/Sung Performance

- "Loyalty" – Kendrick Lamar featuring Rihanna
- "Prblms" – 6lack
- "Crew" – GoldLink featuring Brent Faiyaz & Shy Glizzy
- "Family Feud" – Jay-Z featuring Beyoncé
- "Love Galore" – SZA featuring Travis Scott

Best Rap Song

- "Humble"
  - K. Duckworth, Asheton Hogan & M. Williams II, songwriters (Kendrick Lamar)
- "Bodak Yellow"
  - Belcalis Almanzar, Dieuson Octave, Klenord Raphael, Shaftizm, Jordan Thorpe & J White, songwriters (Cardi B)
- "Chase Me"
  - Judah Bauer, Brian Burton, Hector Delgado, Jaime Meline, Antwan Patton, Michael Render, Russell Simins & Jon Spencer, songwriters (Danger Mouse featuring Run The Jewels & Big Boi)
- "Sassy"
  - Marlanna Evans, E. Gabouer, Jason Martin & Wyann Vaughn, songwriters (Rapsody)
- "The Story of O.J."
  - Shawn Carter & Dion Wilson, songwriters (Jay-Z)

Best Rap Album

- Damn – Kendrick Lamar
- 4:44 – Jay-Z
- Culture – Migos
- Laila's Wisdom – Rapsody
- Flower Boy – Tyler, the Creator

=== Country ===
Best Country Solo Performance

- "Either Way" – Chris Stapleton
- "Body Like a Back Road" – Sam Hunt
- "Losing You" – Alison Krauss
- "Tin Man" – Miranda Lambert
- "I Could Use a Love Song" – Maren Morris

Best Country Duo/Group Performance

- "Better Man" – Little Big Town
- "It Ain't My Fault" – Brothers Osborne
- "My Old Man" – Zac Brown Band
- "You Look Good" – Lady Antebellum
- "Drinkin' Problem" – Midland

Best Country Song

- "Broken Halos"
  - Mike Henderson & Chris Stapleton, songwriters (Chris Stapleton)
- "Better Man"
  - Taylor Swift, songwriter (Little Big Town)
- "Body Like a Back Road"
  - Zach Crowell, Sam Hunt, Shane McAnally & Josh Osborne, songwriters (Sam Hunt)
- "Drinkin' Problem"
  - Jess Carson, Cameron Duddy, Shane McAnally, Josh Osborne & Mark Wystrach, songwriters (Midland)
- "Tin Man"
  - Jack Ingram, Miranda Lambert & Jon Randall, songwriters (Miranda Lambert)

Best Country Album

- From A Room: Volume 1 – Chris Stapleton
- Cosmic Hallelujah – Kenny Chesney
- Heart Break – Lady Antebellum
- The Breaker – Little Big Town
- Life Changes – Thomas Rhett

=== New Age ===
Best New Age Album

- Dancing on Water – Peter Kater
- Reflection – Brian Eno
- SongVersation: Medicine – India Arie
- Sacred Journey of Ku-Kai, Volume 5 – Kitarō
- Spiral Revelation – Steve Roach

=== Jazz ===
Best Improvised Jazz Solo

- "Miles Beyond" – John McLaughlin, soloist
- "Can't Remember Why" – Sara Caswell, soloist
- "Dance of Shiva" – Billy Childs, soloist
- "Whisper Not" – Fred Hersch, soloist
- "Ilimba" – Chris Potter, soloist

Best Jazz Vocal Album

- Dreams and Daggers – Cécile McLorin Salvant
- The Journey – The Baylor Project
- A Social Call – Jazzmeia Horn
- Bad Ass and Blind – Raul Midón
- Porter Plays Porter – Randy Porter Trio with Nancy King

Best Jazz Instrumental Album

- Rebirth – Billy Childs
- Uptown, Downtown – Bill Charlap Trio
- Project Freedom – Joey DeFrancesco & The People
- Open Book – Fred Hersch
- The Dreamer Is the Dream – Chris Potter

Best Large Jazz Ensemble Album

- Bringin' It – Christian McBride Big Band
- MONK'estra Vol. 2 – John Beasley
- Jigsaw – Alan Ferber Big Band
- Homecoming – Vince Mendoza & WDR Big Band Cologne
- Whispers on the Wind – Chuck Owen and the Jazz Surge

Best Latin Jazz Album

- Jazz Tango – Pablo Ziegler Trio
- Hybrido – From Rio to Wayne Shorter – Antonio Adolfo
- Oddara – Jane Bunnett & Maqueque
- Outra Coisa – The Music of Moacir Santos – Anat Cohen & Marcello Gonçalves
- Típico – Miguel Zenón

=== Gospel/contemporary Christian music ===
Best Gospel Performance/Song

- "Never Have to Be Alone" – CeCe Winans
  - Dwan Hill & Alvin Love III, songwriters
- "Too Hard Not To" – Tina Campbell
  - Tina Campbell & Warryn Campbell, songwriters
- "You Deserve It" – JJ Hairston & Youthful Praise featuring Bishop Cortez Vaughn
  - David Bloom, JJ Hairston, Phontane Demond Reed & Cortez Vaughn, songwriters
- "Better Days" – Le'Andria
  - Le'Andria, songwriter
- "My Life" – The Walls Group
  - Warryn Campbell, Eric Dawkins, Damien Farmer, Damon Thomas, Ahjah Walls & Darrel Walls, songwriters

Best Contemporary Christian Music Performance/Song

- "What a Beautiful Name" – Hillsong Worship
  - Ben Fielding & Brooke Ligertwood, songwriters
- "Oh My Soul" – Casting Crowns
  - Mark Hall, Bernie Herms & Nichole Nordeman, songwriters
- "Clean" – Natalie Grant
  - Natalie Grant, songwriter
- "Even If" – MercyMe
  - David Garcia, Ben Glover, Crystal Lewis, MercyMe & Tim Timmons, songwriters
- "Hills and Valleys" – Tauren Wells
  - Chuck Butler, Jonathan Smith & Tauren Wells, songwriters

Best Gospel Album

- Let Them Fall in Love – CeCe Winans
- Crossover: Live from Music City – Travis Greene
- Bigger Than Me – Le'Andria Johnson
- Close – Marvin Sapp
- Sunday Song – Anita Wilson

Best Contemporary Christian Music Album

- Chain Breaker – Zach Williams
- Rise – Danny Gokey
- Echoes (deluxe edition) – Matt Maher
- Lifer – MercyMe
- Hills and Valleys – Tauren Wells

Best Roots Gospel Album

- Sing It Now: Songs of Faith & Hope – Reba McEntire
- The Best of The Collingsworth Family – Volume 1 – The Collingsworth Family
- Give Me Jesus – Larry Cordle
- Resurrection – Joseph Habedank
- Hope for All Nations – Karen Peck & New River

=== Latin ===
Best Latin Pop Album

- El Dorado – Shakira
- Lo Único Constante – Alex Cuba
- Mis Planes Son Amarte – Juanes
- Amar y Vivir (En Vivo Desde la Ciudad de México, 2017) – La Santa Cecilia
- Musas (Un Homenaje al Folclore Latinoamericano en Manos de Los Macorinos) – Natalia Lafourcade

Best Latin Rock, Urban or Alternative Album

- Residente – Residente
- Ayo – Bomba Estéreo
- Pa' Fuera – C4 Trío & Desorden Público
- Salvavidas de Hielo – Jorge Drexler
- El Paradise – Los Amigos Invisibles

Best Regional Mexican Music Album (Including Tejano)

- Arrieros Somos – Sesiones Acústicas – Aida Cuevas
- Ni Diablo, ni Santo – Julión Álvarez y Su Norteño Banda
- Ayer y Hoy – Banda el Recodo de Cruz Lizárraga
- Momentos – Alex Campos
- Zapateando en el Norte – (various artists)

Best Tropical Latin Album

- Salsa Big Band – Rubén Blades con Roberto Delgado & Orquesta
- Albita – Albita
- Art of the Arrangement – Doug Beavers
- Gente Valiente – Silvestre Dangond
- Indestructible – Diego el Cigala

=== American roots ===
Best American Roots Performance

- "Killer Diller Blues" – Alabama Shakes
- "Let My Mother Live" – Blind Boys of Alabama
- "Arkansas Farmboy" – Glen Campbell
- "Steer Your Way" – Leonard Cohen
- "I Never Cared for You" – Alison Krauss

Best American Roots Song

- "If We Were Vampires"
  - Jason Isbell, songwriter (Jason Isbell and the 400 Unit)
- "Cumberland Gap"
  - David Rawlings & Gillian Welch, songwriters (David Rawlings)
- "I Wish You Well"
  - Raul Malo & Alan Miller, songwriters (The Mavericks)
- "It Ain't Over Yet"
  - Rodney Crowell, songwriter (Rodney Crowell featuring Rosanne Cash & John Paul White)
- "My Only True Friend"
  - Gregg Allman & Scott Sharrard, songwriters (Gregg Allman)

Best Americana Album

- The Nashville Sound – Jason Isbell and the 400 Unit
- Southern Blood – Gregg Allman
- Shine on Rainy Day – Brent Cobb
- Beast Epic – Iron & Wine
- Brand New Day – The Mavericks

Best Bluegrass Album

- Laws of Gravity – Infamous Stringdusters
- All the Rage: In Concert Volume One [Live] – Rhonda Vincent and the Rage
- Fiddler's Dream – Michael Cleveland
- Original – Bobby Osborne
- Universal Favorite – Noam Pikelny

Best Traditional Blues Album

- Blue & Lonesome – The Rolling Stones
- Migration Blues – Eric Bibb
- Elvin Bishop's Big Fun Trio – Elvin Bishop's Big Fun Trio
- Roll and Tumble – R.L. Boyce
- Sonny & Brownie's Last Train – Guy Davis & Fabrizio Poggi

Best Contemporary Blues Album

- TajMo – Taj Mahal & Keb' Mo'
- Robert Cray & Hi Rhythm – Robert Cray & Hi Rhythm
- Recorded Live in Lafayette – Sonny Landreth
- Got Soul – Robert Randolph and the Family Band
- Live from the Fox Oakland – Tedeschi Trucks Band

Best Folk Album

- Mental Illness – Aimee Mann
- Semper Femina – Laura Marling
- The Queen of Hearts – Offa Rex (Olivia Chaney + The Decemberists)
- You Don't Own Me Anymore – The Secret Sisters
- The Laughing Apple – Yusuf / Cat Stevens

Best Regional Music Album

- Kalenda – The Lost Bayou Ramblers
- Top of the Mountain – Dwayne Dopsie and the Zydeco Hellraisers
- Ho'okena 3.0 – Ho'okena
- Miyo Kekisepa, Make a Stand [Live] – Northern Cree
- Pua Kiele – Josh Tatofi

=== Reggae ===
Best Reggae Album

- Stony Hill – Damian "Jr. Gong" Marley
- Chronology – Chronixx
- Lost in Paradise – Common Kings
- Wash House Ting – J Boog
- Avrakedabra – Morgan Heritage

=== World music ===
Best World Music Album

- Shaka Zulu Revisited: 30th Anniversary Celebration – Ladysmith Black Mambazo
- Memoria de los Sentidos – Vicente Amigo
- Para Mí – Concha Buika
- Rosa dos Ventos – Anat Cohen & Trio Brasileiro
- Elwan – Tinariwen

=== Children ===
Best Children's Album

- Feel What U Feel – Lisa Loeb
- Brighter Side – Gustafer Yellowgold
- Lemonade – Justin Roberts
- Rise Shine #Woke – Alphabet Rockers
- Songs of Peace & Love for Kids & Parents Around the World – Ladysmith Black Mambazo

=== Spoken word ===
Best Spoken Word Album (includes Poetry, Audio Books and Storytelling)

- The Princess Diarist – Carrie Fisher (posthumous)
- Astrophysics for People in a Hurry – Neil deGrasse Tyson
- Born to Run – Bruce Springsteen
- Confessions of a Serial Songwriter – Shelly Peiken
- Our Revolution: A Future to Believe In – Bernie Sanders and Mark Ruffalo

=== Comedy ===
Best Comedy Album

- The Age of Spin & Deep in the Heart of Texas – Dave Chappelle
- Cinco – Jim Gaffigan
- Jerry Before Seinfeld – Jerry Seinfeld
- A Speck of Dust – Sarah Silverman
- What Now? – Kevin Hart

=== Musical theatre ===
Best Musical Theater Album

- Dear Evan Hansen – Laura Dreyfuss, Mike Faist, Rachel Bay Jones, Kristolyn Lloyd, Michael Park, Ben Platt, Will Roland & Jennifer Laura Thompson, principal soloists; Pete Ganbarg, Alex Lacamoire, Stacey Mindich, Benj Pasek & Justin Paul, producers; Benj Pasek & Justin Paul, composers/lyricists (Original Broadway Cast Recording)
- Come from Away – Ian Eisendrath, August Eriksmoen, David Hein, David Lai & Irene Sankoff, producers; David Hein & Irene Sankoff, composers/lyricists (Original Broadway Cast Recording)
- Hello, Dolly! – Bette Midler, principal soloist; Steven Epstein, producer; (Jerry Herman, composer and lyricist) (New Broadway Cast Recording)

=== Music for visual media ===
Best Compilation Soundtrack for Visual Media

- La La Land – (various artists)
  - Marius de Vries & Justin Hurwitz, compilation producers
- Baby Driver – (various artists)
  - Edgar Wright, compilation producer
- Guardians of the Galaxy Vol. 2: Awesome Mix Vol. 2 – (various artists)
  - James Gunn, compilation producer
- Hidden Figures – (various artists)
  - Pharrell Williams, compilation producer
- Moana – (various artists)
  - Opetaia Foa'i, Tom MacDougall, Mark Mancina & Lin-Manuel Miranda, compilation producers

Best Score Soundtrack for Visual Media

- La La Land – Justin Hurwitz, composer
- Arrival – Jóhann Jóhannsson, composer
- Dunkirk – Hans Zimmer, composer
- Game of Thrones: Season 7 – Ramin Djawadi, composer
- Hidden Figures – Benjamin Wallfisch, Pharrell Williams & Hans Zimmer, composers

Best Song Written for Visual Media

- "How Far I'll Go" (from Moana) – Lin-Manuel Miranda, songwriter (Auliʻi Cravalho)
- "City of Stars" (from La La Land) – Justin Hurwitz, Benj Pasek & Justin Paul, songwriters (Ryan Gosling & Emma Stone)
- "I Don't Wanna Live Forever" (from Fifty Shades Darker) – Jack Antonoff, Sam Dew & Taylor Swift, songwriters (Zayn & Taylor Swift)
- "Never Give Up" (from Lion) – Sia Furler & Greg Kurstin, songwriters (Sia)
- "Stand Up for Something" (from Marshall) – Common, Andra Day & Diane Warren, songwriters (Andra Day featuring Common)

=== Composing ===
Best Instrumental Composition

- "Three Revolutions"
  - Arturo O'Farrill, composer (Arturo O'Farrill & Chucho Valdés)
- "Alkaline"
  - Pascal Le Boeuf, composer (Le Boeuf Brothers & JACK Quartet)
- "Choros #3"
  - Vince Mendoza, composer (Vince Mendoza & WDR Big Band Cologne)
- "Warped Cowboy"
  - Chuck Owen, composer (Chuck Owen and the Jazz Surge)
- "Home Free (For Peter Joe)"
  - Nate Smith, composer (Nate Smith)

=== Arranging ===
Best Arrangement, Instrumental or A Cappella

- "Escapades for Alto Saxophone and Orchestra" from Catch Me If You Can
  - John Williams, arranger (John Williams)
- "Ugly Beauty"/"Pannonica"
  - John Beasley, arranger (John Beasley)
- "All Hat, No Saddle"
  - Chuck Owen, arranger (Chuck Owen and the Jazz Surge)
- "Home Free (For Peter Joe)"
  - Nate Smith, arranger (Nate Smith)
- "White Christmas"
  - Chris Walden, arranger (Herb Alpert)

Best Arrangement, Instruments and Vocals

- "Putin"
  - Randy Newman, arranger (Randy Newman)
- "I Loves You Porgy"/"There's a Boat That's Leavin' Soon for New York"
  - Shelly Berg, Gregg Field, Gordon Goodwin & Clint Holmes, arrangers (Clint Holmes featuring Dee Dee Bridgewater and the Count Basie Orchestra)
- "Every Time We Say Goodbye"
  - Jorge Calandrelli, arranger (Clint Holmes featuring Jane Monheit)
- "Another Day of Sun"
  - Justin Hurwitz, arranger (La La Land cast)
- "I Like Myself"
  - Joel McNeely, arranger (Seth MacFarlane)

=== Packaging ===
Best Recording Package

- El Orisha de la Rosa
  - Claudio Roncoli & Cactus Taller, art directors (Magín Díaz)
- Pure Comedy (Deluxe Edition)
  - Sasha Barr, Ed Steed & Josh Tillman, art directors (Father John Misty)
- Mura Masa
  - Alex Crossan & Matt de Jong, art directors (Mura Masa)
- Sleep Well Beast
  - Elyanna Blaser-Gould, Luke Hayman & Andrea Trabucco-Campos, art directors (The National)
- Solid State
  - Gail Marowitz, art director (Jonathan Coulton)

Best Boxed or Special Limited Edition Package

- The Voyager Golden Record: 40th Anniversary Edition
  - Lawrence Azerrad, Timothy Daly & David Pescovitz, art directors (Various Artists)
- Bobo Yeye: Belle Epoque In Upper Volta
  - Tim Breen, art director (Various Artists)
- Lovely Creatures: The Best of Nick Cave and the Bad Seeds
  - Tom Hingston, art director (Nick Cave and the Bad Seeds)
- May 1977: Get Shown the Light
  - Masaki Koike, art director (Grateful Dead)
- Warfaring Strangers: Acid Nightmares
  - Tim Breen, Benjamin Marra & Ken Shipley, art directors (Various Artists)

=== Notes ===
Best Album Notes

- Live at the Whisky a Go Go: The Complete Recordings
  - Lynell George, album notes writer (Otis Redding)
- Arthur Q. Smith: The Trouble with the Truth
  - Wayne Bledsoe & Bradley Reeves, album notes writers (Various Artists)
- Big Bend Killing: The Appalachian Ballad Tradition
  - Ted Olson, album notes writer (Various Artists)
- The Complete Piano Works of Scott Joplin
  - Bryan S. Wright, album notes writer (Richard Dowling)
- Edouard-Léon Scott De Martinville, Inventor of Sound Recording: A Bicentennial Tribute
  - David Giovannoni, album notes writer (Various Artists)
- Washington Phillips and His Manzarene Dreams
  - Michael Corcoran, album notes writer (Washington Phillips)

=== Historical ===
Best Historical Album

- Leonard Bernstein – The Composer
  - Robert Russ, compilation producer; Martin Kistner & Andreas K. Meyer, mastering engineers (Leonard Bernstein)
- Bobo Yeye: Belle Epoque in Upper Volta
  - Jon Kirby, Florent Mazzoleni, Rob Sevier & Ken Shipley, compilation producers; Jeff Lipton & Maria Rice, mastering engineers (Various Artists)
- Glenn Gould – The Goldberg Variations – The Complete Unreleased Recording Sessions June 1955
  - Robert Russ, compilation producer; Matthias Erb, Martin Kistner & Andreas K. Meyer, mastering engineers (Glenn Gould)
- Sweet as Broken Dates: Lost Somali Tapes from the Horn of Africa
  - Nicolas Sheikholeslami & Vik Sohonie, compilation producers; Michael Graves, mastering engineer (Various Artists)
- Washington Phillips and His Manzarene Dreams
  - Michael Corcoran, April G. Ledbetter & Steven Lance Ledbetter, compilation producers; Michael Graves, mastering engineer (Washington Phillips)

=== Engineered album ===
Best Engineered Album, Non-Classical

- 24K Magic
  - Serban Ghenea, John Hanes & Charles Moniz, engineers; Tom Coyne, mastering engineer (Bruno Mars)
- Every Where Is Some Where
  - Brent Arrowood, Miles Comaskey, JT Daly, Tommy English, Kristine Flaherty, Adam Hawkins, Chad Howat & Tony Maserati, engineers; Joe LaPorta, mastering engineer (K.Flay)
- Is This the Life We Really Want?
  - Nigel Godrich, Sam Petts-Davies & Darrell Thorp, engineers; Bob Ludwig, mastering engineer (Roger Waters)
- Natural Conclusion
  - Ryan Freeland, engineer; Joao Carvalho, mastering engineer (Rose Cousins)
- No Shape
  - Shawn Everett & Joseph Lorge, engineers; Patricia Sullivan, mastering engineer (Perfume Genius)

Best Engineered Album, Classical

- Shostakovich: Symphony No. 5; Barber: Adagio
  - Mark Donahue, engineer (Manfred Honeck & Pittsburgh Symphony Orchestra)
- Danielpour: Songs of Solitude & War Songs
  - Gary Call, engineer (Thomas Hampson, Giancarlo Guerrero & the Nashville Symphony)
- Kleiberg: Mass for Modern Man
  - Morten Lindberg, engineer (Eivind Gulliberg Jensen, Trondheim Vokalensemble & Trondheim Symphony Orchestra)
- Schoenberg, Adam: American Symphony; Finding Rothko; Picture Studies
  - Keith O. Johnson & Sean Royce Martin, engineers (Michael Stern & the Kansas City Symphony)
- Tyberg: Masses
  - John Newton, engineer; Jesse Brayman, mastering engineer (Brian A. Schmidt, Christopher Jacobson & South Dakota Chorale)

=== Producer ===
Producer of the Year, Non-Classical

- Greg Kurstin
  - Concrete and Gold (Foo Fighters)
  - "Dear Life" (Beck)
  - "Dusk Till Dawn" (Zayn featuring Sia)
  - "Love" (Kendrick Lamar featuring Zacari)
  - "Strangers" (Halsey featuring Lauren Jauregui)
  - "Wall of Glass" (Liam Gallagher)
- Calvin Harris
  - "Don't Quit" (DJ Khaled & Calvin Harris featuring Travis Scott & Jeremih)
  - Funk Wav Bounces Vol. 1 (Calvin Harris featuring Various Artists)
- Blake Mills
  - Darkness and Light (John Legend)
  - Eternally Even (Jim James)
  - "God Only Knows" (John Legend & Cynthia Erivo featuring yMusic)
  - Memories Are Now (Jesca Hoop)
  - No Shape (Perfume Genius)
  - Semper Femina (Laura Marling)
- No I.D.
  - "America" (Logic featuring Black Thought, Chuck D, Big Lenbo & No I.D.)
  - The Autobiography (Vic Mensa)
  - 4:44 (Jay-Z)
- The Stereotypes
  - "Before I Do" (Sevyn Streeter)
  - "Better" (Lil Yachty featuring Stefflon Don)
  - "Deliver" (Fifth Harmony)
  - "Finesse" (Bruno Mars)
  - "Mo Bounce" (Iggy Azalea)
  - "Sunshine" (Kyle featuring Miguel)
  - "That's What I Like" (Bruno Mars)

Producer of the Year, Classical

- David Frost
  - Alma Española (Isabel Leonard)
  - Amplified Soul (Gabriela Martinez)
  - Beethoven: Piano Sonatas, Vol. 6 (Jonathan Biss)
  - Bruckner: Symphony No. 9 (Riccardo Muti and Chicago Symphony Orchestra)
  - Garden Of Joys And Sorrows (Hat Trick Trio)
  - Laks: Chamber Works (ARC Ensemble)
  - Adam Schoenberg: American Symphony; Finding Rothko; Picture Studies (Michael Stern and Kansas City Symphony)
  - Troika (Matt Haimovitz and Christopher O'Riley)
  - Verdi: Otello (Yannick Nézet-Séguin, Günther Groissböck, Željko Lučić, Dimitri Pittas, Aleksandrs Antoņenko, Sonya Yoncheva, Metropolitan Opera Orchestra and Chorus)
- Blanton Alspaugh
  - Adamo: Becoming Santa Claus (Emmanuel Villaume, Kevin Burdette, Keith Jameson, Lucy Schaufer, Hila Plitmann, Matt Boehler, Jonathan Blalock, Jennifer Rivera & Dallas Opera Orchestra)
  - Aldridge: Sister Carrie (William Boggs, Keith Phares, Matt Morgan, Alisa Suzanne Jordheim, Stephen Cunningham, Adriana Zabala, Florentine Opera Chorus & Milwaukee Symphony Orchestra)
  - Copland: Symphony No. 3; Three Latin American Sketches (Leonard Slatkin & Detroit Symphony Orchestra)
  - Death & The Maiden (Patricia Kopatchinskaja & The Saint Paul Chamber Orchestra)
  - Handel: Messiah (Andrew Davis, Noel Edison, Toronto Mendelssohn Choir & Toronto Symphony Orchestra)
  - Haydn: Symphonies Nos. 53, 64 & 96 (Carlos Kalmar & Oregon Symphony)
  - Heggie: It's A Wonderful Life (Patrick Summers, William Burden, Talise Trevigne, Andrea Carroll, Rod Gilfry & Houston Grand Opera)
  - Tyberg: Masses (Brian A. Schmidt, Christopher Jacobson & South Dakota Chorale)
- Manfred Eicher
  - Mansurian: Requiem (Alexander Liebreich, Florian Helgath, RIAS Kammerchor & Münchener Kammerorchester)
  - Monk, M.: On Behalf Of Nature (Meredith Monk & Vocal Ensemble)
  - Point & Line – Debussy And Hosokawa (Momo Kodama)
  - Rímur (Arve Henriksen & Trio Mediaeval)
  - Silvestrov: Hieroglyphen Der Nacht (Anja Lechner)
- Morten Lindberg
  - Furatus (Ole Edvard Antonsen & Wolfgang Plagge)
  - Interactions (Bård Monsen & Gunnar Flagstad)
  - Kleiberg: Mass For Modern Man (Eivind Gullberg Jensen, Trondheim Vokalensemble & Trondheim Symphony Orchestra)
  - Minor Major (Oslo String Quartet)
  - Northern Timbre (Ragnhild Hemsing & Tor Espen Aspaas)
  - So Is My Love (Nina T. Karlsen & Ensemble 96)
  - Thoresen: Sea Of Names (Trond Schau)
- Judith Sherman
  - American Nocturnes (Cecile Licad)
  - The Birthday Party (Aki Takahashi)
  - Discovering Bach (Michelle Ross)
  - Foss: Pieces Of Genius (New York New Music Ensemble)
  - Secret Alchemy – Chamber Works By Pierre Jalbert (Curtis Macomber & Michael Boriskin)
  - Sevenfive – The John Corigliano Effect (Gaudette Brass)
  - Sonic Migrations – Music Of Laurie Altman (Various Artists)
  - Tribute (Dover Quartet)
  - 26 (Melia Watras & Michael Jinsoo Lim)

=== Remixer ===
Best Remixed Recording, Non-Classical

- "You Move" (Latroit Remix)
  - Dennis White, remixer (Depeche Mode)
- "Can't Let You Go" (Louie Vega Roots Mix)
  - Louie Vega, remixer (Loleatta Holloway)
- "Funk O'De Funk" (Smle Remix)
  - Smle, remixer (Bobby Rush)
- "Undercover" (Adventure Club Remix)
  - Leighton James & Christian Srigley, remixer (Kehlani)
- "A Violent Noise" (Four Tet Remix)
  - Four Tet, remixer (The XX)

=== Surround sound ===
Best Surround Sound Album

- Early Americans
  - Jim Anderson, surround mix engineer; Darcy Proper, surround mastering engineer; Jim Anderson & Jane Ira Bloom, surround producers (Jane Ira Bloom)
- Kleiberg: Mass for Modern Man
  - Morten Lindberg, surround mix engineer; Morten Lindberg, surround mastering engineer; Morten Lindberg, surround producer (Eivind Gullberg Jensen & Trondheim Symphony Orchestra and Choir)
- So Is My Love
  - Morten Lindberg, surround mix engineer; Morten Lindberg, surround mastering engineer; Morten Lindberg, surround producer (Nina T. Karlsen & Ensemble 96)
- 3-D The Catalogue
  - Fritz Hilpert, surround mix engineer; Tom Ammermann, surround mastering engineer; Fritz Hilpert, surround producer (Kraftwerk)
- Tyberg: Masses
  - Jesse Brayman, surround mix engineer; Jesse Brayman, surround mastering engineer; Blanton Alspaugh, surround producer (Brian A. Schmidt, Christopher Jacobson & South Dakota Chorale)

=== Classical ===
Best Orchestral Performance

- Shostakovich: Symphony No. 5; Barber: Adagio
  - Manfred Honeck, conductor (Pittsburgh Symphony Orchestra)
- Concertos for Orchestra
  - Louis Langrée, conductor (Cincinnati Symphony Orchestra)
- Copland: Symphony No. 3; Three Latin American Sketches
  - Leonard Slatkin, conductor (Detroit Symphony Orchestra)
- Debussy: Images; Jeux & La Plus Que Lente
  - Michael Tilson Thomas, conductor (San Francisco Symphony)
- Mahler: Symphony No. 5
  - Osmo Vänskä, conductor (Minnesota Orchestra)

Best Opera Recording

- Berg: Wozzeck
  - Hans Graf, conductor; Anne Schwanewilms & Roman Trekel, soloists; Hans Graf, producer (Houston Symphony; Chorus Of Students And Alumni, Shepherd School of Music, Rice University & Houston Grand Opera Children's Chorus)
- Berg: Lulu
  - Lothar Koenigs, conductor; Daniel Brenna, Marlis Petersen & Johan Reuter, soloists; Jay David Saks, producer (Metropolitan Opera Orchestra)
- Bizet: Les Pêcheurs De Perles
  - Gianandrea Noseda, conductor; Diana Damrau, Mariusz Kwiecień, Matthew Polenzani & Nicolas Testé, soloists; Jay David Saks, producer (Metropolitan Opera Orchestra and Chorus)
- Händel: Ottone
  - George Petrou, conductor; Max Emanuel Cencic & Lauren Snouffer, soloists; Jacob Händel, producer (Il Pomo D'Oro)
- Rimsky-Korsakov: The Golden Cockerel
  - Valery Gergiev, conductor; Vladimir Feliauer, Aida Garifullina & Kira Loginova, soloists; Ilya Petrov, producer (Mariinsky Orchestra; Mariinsky Chorus)

Best Choral Performance

- Bryars: The Fifth Century
  - Donald Nally, conductor; The Crossing, choir (PRISM, ensemble)
- Händel: Messiah
  - Andrew Davis, conductor; Noel Edison, chorus master; Toronto Mendelssohn Choir (Elizabeth DeShong, John Relyea, Andrew Staples & Erin Wall, soloists; Toronto Symphony Orchestra)
- Mansurian: Requiem
  - Alexander Liebreich, conductor; Florian Helgath, chorus master; RIAS Kammerchor (Anja Petersen & Andrew Redmond, soloists; Münchener Kammerorchester)
- Music of the Spheres
  - Nigel Short, conductor; Tenebrae (choir)
- Tyberg: Masses
  - Brian A. Schmidt, conductor; South Dakota Chorale (Christopher Jacobson, soloist)

Best Chamber Music/Small Ensemble Performance

- Death & the Maiden
  - Patricia Kopatchinskaja & the Saint Paul Chamber Orchestra
- Buxtehude: Trio Sonatas Op. 1
  - Arcangelo
- Divine Theatre – Sacred Motets by Giaches de Wert
  - Stile Antico
- Franck, Kurtág, Previn & Schumann
  - Joyce Yang & Augustin Hadelich
- Martha Argerich & Friends – Live From Lugano 2016
  - Martha Argerich & Various Artists

Best Classical Instrumental Solo

- Transcendental
  - Daniil Trifonov
- Bach: The French Suites
  - Murray Perahia
- Haydn: Cello Concertos
  - Steven Isserlis; Florian Donderer, conductor (The Deutsche Kammerphilharmonie Bremen)
- Levina: The Piano Concertos
  - Maria Lettberg; Ariane Matiakh, conductor (Rundfunk-Sinfonieorchester Berlin)
- Shostakovich: Violin Concertos Nos. 1 & 2
  - Frank Peter Zimmermann; Alan Gilbert, conductor (NDR Elbphilharmonie Orchester)

Best Classical Solo Vocal Album

- Crazy Girl Crazy – Music by Gershwin, Berg & Berio
  - Barbara Hannigan
- Bach & Telemann: Sacred Cantatas
  - Philippe Jaroussky, soloist; Petra Müllejans, conductor
- Gods & Monsters
  - Nicholas Phan, soloist; Myra Huang, accompanist
- In War & Peace – Harmony Through Music
  - Joyce DiDonato, soloist; Maxim Emelyanychev, conductor
- Sviridov: Russia Cast Adrift
  - Dmitri Hvorostovsky, soloist; Constantine Orbelian, conductor

Best Classical Compendium

- Higdon: All Things Majestic, Viola Concerto & Oboe Concerto
  - Giancarlo Guerrero, conductor; Tim Handley, producer
- Barbara
  - Alexandre Tharaud, conductor; Cécile Lenoir, producer
- Kurtág: Complete Works for Ensemble & Choir
  - Reinbert de Leeuw, conductor; Guido Tichelman, producer
- Les Routes de l'Esclavage
  - Jordi Savall, conductor; Benjamin Bletton, producer
- Mademoiselle: Première Audience – Unknown Music of Nadia Boulanger
  - Lucy Mauro, pianist and producer

Best Contemporary Classical Composition

- Viola Concerto
  - Jennifer Higdon, composer (Roberto Diaz, Giancarlo Geurrero & the Nashville Symphony)
- Songs of Solitude
  - Richard Danielpour, composer (Thomas Hampson, Giancarlo Guerrero & the Nashville Symphony)
- Requiem
  - Tigran Mansurian, composer (Alexander Liebreich, Florian Helgath, the RIAS Kammerchor & the Münchener Kammerorchester)
- Picture Studies
  - Adam Schoenberg, composer (Michael Stern & the Kansas City Symphony)
- Concerto for Orchestra
  - Zhou Tian, composer (Louis Langrée & the Cincinnati Symphony Orchestra)

=== Music video/film ===
Best Music Video

- "Humble" – Kendrick Lamar
  - The Little Homies & Dave Meyers, video directors; Jason Baum, Dave Free, Jamie Rabineau, Nathan K. Scherrer & Anthony Tiffith, video producers
- "Up All Night" – Beck
  - Canada, video director; Alba Barneda, Laura Serra Estorch & Oscar Romagosa, video producers
- "Makeba" – Jain
  - Lionel Hirle & Gregory Ohrel, video directors; Yodelice, video producer
- "The Story of O.J." – Jay-Z
  - Shawn Carter & Mark Romanek, video directors; Daniel Midgley, Elizabeth Newman & Chaka Pilgrim, video producers
- "1-800-273-8255" – Logic featuring Alessia Cara & Khalid
  - Andy Hines, video director; Brandon Bonfiglio, Mildred Delamota, Andrew Lerios, Luga Podesta & Alex Randal, video producers

Best Music Film

- The Defiant Ones – (various artists)
  - Allen Hughes, video director; Sarah Anthony, Fritzi Horstman, Broderick Johnson, Gene Kirkwood, Andrew Kosove, Laura Lancaster, Michael Lombardo, Jerry Longarzo, Doug Pray & Steven Williams, video producers
- One More Time With Feeling – Nick Cave & The Bad Seeds
  - Andrew Dominik, video director; Dulcie Kellett & James Wilson, video producers
- Long Strange Trip – The Grateful Dead
  - Amir Bar-Lev, video director; Alex Blavatnik, Ken Dornstein, Eric Eisner, Nick Koskoff, Justin Kreutzmann, video producers
- Soundbreaking – (various artists)
  - Maro Chermayeff & Jeff Dupre, video directors; Joshua Bennett, Julia Marchesi, Sam Pollard, Sally Rosenthal, Amy Schewel & Warren Zanes, video producers
- Two Trains Runnin' – (various artists)
  - Sam Pollard, video director; Benjamin Hedin, video producer

== Special merit awards ==
=== MusiCares Person of the Year ===
- Fleetwood Mac
  - Mick Fleetwood
  - John McVie
  - Christine McVie
  - Lindsey Buckingham
  - Stevie Nicks

=== Lifetime Achievement Award ===
- Hal Blaine
- Neil Diamond
- Emmylou Harris
- Louis Jordan
- The Meters
- Queen
- Tina Turner

=== Trustees Award ===
- Bill Graham
- Seymour Stein
- John Williams

=== Technical Grammy Award ===
- Tony Agnello
- Richard Factor

=== Music Educator Award ===
- 2014 Kent Knappenberger (Westfield Academy and Central School in Westfield, N.Y.)
- 2015 Jared Cassedy (of Windham High School in Windham, N.H.)
- 2016 Phillip Riggs (of North Carolina School of Science and Mathematics in Durham, N.C)
- 2017 Keith Hancock (of Tesoro High School in Rancho Santa Margarita, C.A.)
- 2018 Melissa Salguero (of P.S. 48 Joseph R. Drake in Hunts Point, Bronx)
- 2019 Jeffery Redding (of West Orange High School in Florida
- 2020 Mickey Smith Jr. (of Maplewood Middle School in Sulphur, Louisiana)
- 2021 Jeffrey Murdock (of The University of Arkansas)
- 2022 Stephen Cox (of Eastland High School in Eastland, Texas)

== Grammy Hall of Fame inductions ==
Title	Artist	Record label	Year of release	Genre	Format
Band of Gypsys	Jimi Hendrix	Capitol	1970	Rock	Album
"Bring It On Home to Me"	Sam Cooke	RCA Victor	1962	Soul	Single
The Chronic	Dr. Dre	Death Row Records	1992	Rap	Album
"Dream On"	Aerosmith	Columbia	1973	Rock	Single
"Fight the Power"	Public Enemy	Motown	1989	Hip hop	Single
"Flash Light"	Parliament	Casablanca	1978	Funk	Single
"Grazing in the Grass"	Hugh Masekela	Uni	1968	Jazz	Single
Heart Like a Wheel	Linda Ronstadt	Capitol	1974	Country rock	Album
"I Can't Help Myself"	Four Tops	Motown	1965	Soul	Single
"I Heard It Through the Grapevine"	Gladys Knight & the Pips	Motown	1967	R&B	Single
"(I Love You) For Sentimental Reasons"	The King Cole Trio	Capitol Records	1946	Jazz	Single
"I Will Always Love You"	Whitney Houston	Arista	1992	Pop	Single
Johnny Cash at Folsom Prison	Johnny Cash	Columbia	1968	Country	Album
"Mary Had a Little Lamb"	Thomas Alva Edison	—N/a	1878	Experimental	Single
"Me and Mrs. Jones"	Billy Paul	Philadelphia International	1972	Soul	Single
"Moon River"	Andy Williams	Columbia	1962	Traditional pop	Track from Moon River and Other Great Movie Themes
"My Man"	Billie Holiday	Brunswick	1937	Jazz	Single
Nevermind	Nirvana	DGC	1991	Grunge	Album
A Night at the Opera	Queen	Elektra	1975	Progressive rock	Album
"Paint It, Black"	The Rolling Stones	London	1966	Psychedelic rock	Single
"Savoy Blues"	Louis Armstrong and His Hot Five	Okeh	1927	Jazz	Single
"A Song for You"	Leon Russell	Shelter	1970	Pop	Single
"Space Oddity"	David Bowie	Mercury	1969	Art rock	Track from Space Oddity
"That's All Right"	Arthur "Big Boy" Crudup	RCA Victor	1949	Blues	Single
Tubular Bells	Mike Oldfield	Virgin	1973	Progressive rock	Album

== In memoriam ==
- Tom Petty
- Walter Becker
- J Geils
- Eddie Clarke
- Pat DiNizio
- Gord Downie
- Ray Thomas
- Johnny Hallyday
- Cuba Gooding Sr.
- Charles Bradley
- Denise LaSalle
- Dolores O'Riordan
- Chuck Berry
- David Cassidy
- Glen Campbell
- Troy Gentry
- Jo Walker-Meador
- Bill Hearn
- Fats Domino
- Keely Smith
- Sylvia Moy
- Bunny Sigler
- Wayne Cochran
- Leon Ware
- Gregg Allman
- Lonnie Brooks
- James Cotton
- Clyde Stubblefield
- Rick Hall
- Jimmy Beaumont
- Gary Arnold
- Jay Lowy
- Paul Buckmaster
- Joni Sledge
- Don Williams
- Mel Tillis
- Jon Hendricks
- Hugh Masekela
- Larry Coryell
- John Abercrombie
- Grady Tate
- Allan Holdsworth
- Ralph Carney
- George Avakian
- Tommy LiPuma
- Roberta Peters
- Robert Mann
- Jerry Lewis
- Jim Nabors
- Shelley Berman
- Prodigy
- Lil Peep
- Reggie Osse
- Chris Cornell
- Malcolm Young
- Bruce Hampton
- Bruce Langhorne
- Ed Greene
- Jordan Feldstein
- Sandy Gallin
- Carol Peters
- Joseph Rascoff
- Harry Sandler
- Edwin Hawkins
- Della Reese
- Thomas Meehan
- Dave Valentin
- Jerry Perenchio
- Jerry Ross
- Tom Coyne
- Nigel Grainge
- Chester Bennington

== Multiple nominations and awards ==
The following received multiple nominations:

Eight:

- Jay-Z

Seven:

- Kendrick Lamar

Six:

- Bruno Mars

Five:

- Childish Gambino
- Khalid
- No I.D.
- SZA

Four:

- Christopher Brody Brown
- Alessia Cara
- Serban Ghenea
- John Hanes
- Justin Hurwitz
- Philip Lawrence
- Morten Lindberg

Three:

- Justin Bieber
- Tom Coyne
- Daddy Yankee
- James Fauntleroy
- Luis Fonsi
- Ludwig Goransson
- Dave Kutch
- Ledisi
- Charles Moniz
- Nothing More
- Chuck Owen
- Chris Stapleton
- The Stereotypes
- Pharrell Williams

Two:

- Derek "MixedByAli" Ali
- Gregg Allman
- Blanton Alspaugh
- Jack Antonoff
- The Baylor Project
- John Beasley
- 6lack
- Bonobo
- Mike Bozzi
- Jesse Brayman
- Tim Breen
- Daniel Caesar
- Warryn Campbell
- Cardi B
- Billy Childs
- Anat Cohen
- Leonard Cohen
- Coldplay
- Michael Corcoran
- JT Daly
- Jimmy Douglass
- Foo Fighters
- Gorillaz
- Michael Graves
- Bernie Grundman
- Fred Hersch
- James Hetfield
- Fritz Hilpert
- Asheton Hogan
- James Hunt
- Sam Hunt
- Imagine Dragons
- Jason Isbell and the 400 Unit
- Gimel "Young Guru" Keaton
- Kesha
- K.Flay
- Martin Kistner
- Alison Krauss
- Greg Kurstin
- Lady Antebellum
- Lady Gaga
- Ladysmith Black Mambazo
- Miranda Lambert
- LCD Soundsystem
- Le'Andria
- Lil Uzi Vert
- Little Big Town
- Logic
- Riley Mackin
- Raul Malo
- Mura Masa
- Mastodon
- Shane McAnally
- Vince Mendoza
- MercyMe
- Andreas K. Meyer
- Julia Michaels
- Midland
- Migos
- Mike Will Made It
- Lin-Manuel Miranda
- Father John Misty
- Odesza
- Josh Osborne
- Pasek and Paul
- Sam Pollard
- Chris Potter
- Rapsody
- Ruben Rivera
- Robert Russ
- Jay David Saks
- Matt Schaeffer
- Ed Sheeran
- Ken Shipley
- Nate Smith
- Taylor Swift
- Andrew Taggart
- Anthony Tiffith
- Lars Ulrich
- Tauren Wells
- CeCe Winans
- Hans Zimmer

The following received multiple awards:

Six:

- Bruno Mars

Five:

- Kendrick Lamar

Three:

- Christopher Brody Brown
- Tom Coyne
- James Fauntleroy
- Serban Ghenea
- John Hanes
- Philip Lawrence
- Charles Moniz
- Chris Stapleton

Two:

- Justin Hurwitz
- Jason Isbell
- Ray Charles McCullough II
- Jeremy Reeves
- Ray Romulus
- Shampoo Press & Curl
- Ed Sheeran
- CeCe Winans
- Johnathan Yip

== Changes ==
In June 2017, the Grammy organization announced a few minor changes to the voting and awarding process.

- As of 2018, voting members will cast their votes online rather than by paper ballot. This transition will provide greater flexibility for touring artists, eliminate the possibility of invalid ballots, and protect further against fraudulent voting.
- All music creators, including songwriters, producers, engineers, mixers, mastering engineers and featured artists, which are credited with at least 33 percent or more playing time on the winning album will be eligible to receive a Grammy in the Album of the Year category. This is the first time songwriters are recognized in this category.
- From this year on, Nominations Review Committees will be created and implemented for the Rap, Contemporary Instrumental, and New Age Fields.
- From this year, the definition of Album is expanded in Classical, Dance, And Jazz Fields. To be eligible for Grammy consideration, an album must comprise a minimum total playing time of 15 minutes with at least five distinct tracks or a minimum total playing time of 30 minutes with no minimum track requirement.
- An exception on the rule of only one version of a song allowed to enter in the Grammy Awards nomination process will be made in the Best Song Written for Visual Media category, allowing the film version of a track to be entered in the category, even if a different version of the track is submitted in other categories. In the Best Compilation Soundtrack for Visual Media category, eligibility guidelines have been amended to require soundtrack albums for a documentary or biopic to contain 51 percent or more of newly recorded music.

== New York as a host city ==
The 60th Annual Grammy Awards marked the first time since 2003 that the ceremony was held in New York City. The Staples Center in Los Angeles had been the home of the Grammys since 2000. The 2003 ceremony was also held at New York City's Madison Square Garden. The fifteen-year gap between the 2003 and 2018 Grammys in New York marked the longest period of time New York went without hosting the awards.

With the main telecast being held at Madison Square Garden, the premiere ceremony (also known as the Pre-Telecast) was held at the Hulu Theater.

The MusiCares Person of the Year tribute is typically held at the Los Angeles Convention Center two days prior to the Grammys, but since the 2018 Grammy Awards were held in New York, the MusiCares tribute was held at Radio City Music Hall.

=== Controversy and cost overruns ===
Hosting the Grammy Awards in New York City resulted in the Grammy Awards costing more to organize, as the costs associated with hosting it in Los Angeles are significantly less. The awards cost $8 million more to host in New York City. The host committee that the city assembled failed to raise the money that they had initially promised. The MusiCares Person of the Year tribute, which the Barclays Center (operated by AEG) was hoping to host, ended up being held at Radio City Music Hall, which is owned by The Madison Square Garden Company. MusiCares funds, which were intended for charitable purposes, were instead used to pay for the $8 million cost overruns associated with hosting the Grammys in New York City.

Dana Tomarken, the former executive VP of MusiCares, claims that Recording Academy president Neil Portnow directed these funds away from MusiCares to pay for the cost overruns. Dana Tomarken had been negotiating a deal to have the MusiCares Person of the Year tribute to Fleetwood Mac to be held at the Barclays Center, but Portnow decided to have it at Radio City Music Hall, without consulting Tomarken. Irving Azoff who heads Azoff MSG Entertainment (which is affiliated with The Madison Square Garden Company), informed her of this change rather than Portnow consulting her first. Tomarken has since made a claim of wrongful termination. On June 5, 2018, an independent investigation was launched to examine the claims made by Dana Tomarken. The investigation also examined the MusiCares Person of the Year tribute as well as sexual harassment allegations. In May 2019, Tomarken claimed she was fired because she pushed back against the academy's "boys club". The academy allegedly tried to keep Tomarken's allegations from being fully made public. She also claimed that she struggled to find a suitable venue in New York for the MusiCares Person of the Year tribute to Fleetwood Mac. The Barclays Center offered up an acceptable deal, but Irving Azoff of the Madison Square Garden Company prevented the event from being held there. By having it at Radio City instead, the event was not a traditional VIP dinner, nor did it have a silent auction. This then prevented the event from turning a profit.

On June 4, 2018, the mayor's office weighed in on the controversy, saying their position was always to be "venue neutral" and denied any involvement in the venue controversy. The Barclays Center notified City Hall of their interest in being involved with Grammy week, and Julie Menin (the New York City Commissioner for the Mayor's Office of Media and Entertainment) passed that information along to Grammy organizers.

== Ratings ==
The show was moved to January to avoid competing with the 2018 Winter Olympics in Pyeongchang, as was the case in 2010 and 2014. Viewership for the ceremony dropped 24% compared to the previous year, obtaining the smallest audience in the show's history in the key demographic.
