= James Sommerville =

Canadian hornist and conductor (born 1962)

James Sommerville is a Canadian orchestral hornist and conductor. He was the principal hornist for the Boston Symphony Orchestra, and former conductor and music director of the Hamilton Philharmonic, in Hamilton, Ontario.

== Early life and education ==
Sommerville was born in Women's College Hospital in Toronto in 1962. He attended high school at UTS and later studied at the University of Western Ontario with Robert Creech and then at the University of Toronto with Eugene Rittich.

== Career ==
Sommerville was associate principal horn of the Montreal Symphony (Montreal Symphony Orchestra) (1986–1991), acting principal horn of the Chamber Orchestra of Europe (1996–1998), and third horn of the Toronto Symphony Orchestra (1997). He was also principal horn of the Canadian Opera Company and Symphony Nova Scotia. Sommerville joined the Boston Symphony Orchestra as principal horn in 1998. He directed the Hamilton Philharmonic Orchestra from 2007 to 2015.

Sommerville has also performed and recorded internationally as a chamber musician and soloist, and teaches at the Longy School of Music and the New England Conservatory of Music. He is heard on recordings on CBC, Marquis, Deutsche Grammophon, and Decca labels.

Sommerville inspired the creation of Elliott Carter's 2006 Horn Concerto, which he premiered with the Boston Symphony Orchestra in November 2007.

He retired from his position as principal horn with the BSO in December 2022.

== Discography ==
=== Solo recordings ===
- Chamber Music For Horn (Marquis Classics ERAD 157) - 1994
- Mozart Horn Concertos - with CBC Vancouver Orchestra; Mario Bernardi, conductor (CBC Records SMCD5172) - 1997

=== Recordings as featured soloist ===
- A Britten Serenade - with Manitoba Chamber Orchestra; Simon Streatfeild, conductor (CBC Records SMCD5187) - 1998
- I Remember (Cambria CD-1247) - 2017

=== Chamber music recordings ===
- A Birthday Hansel: Music for Voice and Harp (Chandos CHAN9843W) - 2023
- Bella Tuscany: Music Inspired by Tuscany (Telarc CD-80644) - 2004
- Benjamin Britten: The Canticles - with The Aldeburgh Connection (Marquis Classics ERAD 185) - 1996
- Carl Reinecke And Friends: Chamber Music of The Romantic Era (Marquis Classics MAR-309) - 2003
- Gabrieli - with National Brass Ensemble (Oberlin Music OC 15-04) - 2015
- In the Twilight: Romantic Music for Soprano, Horn and Piano (Boston Records BR1047CD) - 2001
- Mozart - Beethoven - Witt: Piano & Wind Quintets (CBC Records SMCD5187) - 2000
- Sciarrino - Ligeti - Schoenberg - with Chamber Orchestra of Europe; Claudio Abbado, conductor (Deutsche Grammophon 00028947950493) - 2015

=== Recordings as conductor ===
- Canadian National Brass Project (Analekta AN28922) - 2020
- Constellations - with Canadian National Brass Project (Analekta AN28924) - 2020
