= Finding Rothko =

Composition by Adam Schoenberg

Finding Rothko is a composition for chamber orchestra by the American composer Adam Schoenberg. The work was commissioned by the Germantown, Tennessee-based IRIS Orchestra under the conductor Michael Stern. It was first performed by the IRIS Orchestra under Stern on January 13, 2007.

== Composition ==
=== Background ===
Schoenberg composed Finding Rothko in 2006 while pursuing his doctoral studies at the Juilliard School. The composer was inspired to write the piece after experiencing the paintings of the abstract expressionist artist Mark Rothko on a visit to the Museum of Modern Art in New York City. Finding Rothko marked Schoenberg's first professional commission as a composer, and he was assisted in arranging the work for chamber orchestra by Michael Stern.

=== Structure ===
Finding Rothko has a duration of approximately 16 minutes and is cast in four movements named after the primary colors used in four different Rothko paintings:

1. Orange
2. Yellow
3. Red
4. Wine

=== Instrumentation ===
The work is scored for a chamber orchestra consisting of two flutes (both doubling piccolo), two oboes (second doubling cor anglais), two clarinets (second doubling bass clarinet), two bassoons (second doubling contrabassoon), two horns, two trumpets, piano (doubling celesta), two percussionists, and strings.

== Reception ==
Reviewing a 2011 performance of Finding Rothko at the Aspen Music Festival, Harvey Steiman of The Aspen Times praised the work's "colorful orchestration, rich textures and a sense of power and inevitability similar to that which invests the painter's work." He added, "This was highly listenable music, rewarding to apprehend, especially in the broad outlines of the final section's glowing climax."

== Recording ==
A recording of the Finding Rothko featuring the Kansas City Symphony under the direction of Michael Stern was released through Reference Recordings on January 20, 2017. The album also includes performances of Schoenberg's American Symphony (2011) and Picture Studies (2012).
