= American Symphony =

The American Symphony is a symphony for orchestra by the American composer Adam Schoenberg. The work was commissioned by the Kansas City Symphony and was completed in early 2011. It was first performed by the Kansas City Symphony under the direction of Michael Stern at the Kauffman Center for the Performing Arts in Kansas City on March 4, 2011.

== Composition ==
=== Background ===
Schoenberg was inspired to write the American Symphony by the 2008 U.S. Presidential election, about which he wrote, "...both parties asked the people to embrace change and make a difference. I was both excited and honored about ushering in this new era in our nation's history, and for the first time, I truly understood what it meant to be American." The composer cited Aaron Copland's Symphony No. 3, which Schoenberg described as "the quintessential American symphony," as a musical influence on the work. He wrote, "Quite serendipitously, I heard Copland's 3rd three nights after President Obama was elected and, seeing that our country and world had needs similar to those of Copland's time, I was inspired to make a difference. I set out to write a modern American symphony that paid homage to our past and looked forward to a brighter future."

Despite this, Schoenberg described the American Symphony as "not a patriotic work," adding, "the symphony reflects a respect and responsibility for the great potential of our nation and a hunger to affect positive change. It is about our collective ability to restore hope within ourselves and our neighbors, both here and around the world."

=== Structure ===
The symphony has a duration of approximately 24 minutes and is cast in five movements:

1. Fanfare
2. White on Blue
3. Rondo
4. Prayer
5. Stars, Stripes, and Celebration

=== Instrumentation ===
The work is scored for a large orchestra consisting of three flutes (third doubling piccolo), three oboes (third doubling cor anglais), three clarinets (third doubling bass clarinet), three bassoons (third doubling contrabassoon), four horns, three trumpets, three trombones, tuba, harp, piano (doubling celesta), timpani, four percussionists, and strings.

== Reception ==
Reviewing the world premiere, the music critic Timothy McDonald of The Kansas City Star highly praised the symphony, writing, "Schoenberg demonstrated a distinctive and exciting compositional voice. His American Symphony is bold and brilliant, and deserves to be a staple among orchestras in the U.S. and abroad." Paul Horsley of Kansas City-based journal The Independent called it an "agreeable new piece" and wrote, "If the finale felt prolix in proportion to the overall length of the symphony, the piece revealed the soul of a strong musician with a natural sense of melody, a playful knack for rhythm and a serious approach to orchestration."

Reviewing a later performance of the piece with the Waterloo-Cedar Falls Symphony, George Day of The Waterloo-Cedar Falls Courier observed, "Its five movements are mostly brisk, sometimes noisy, but always engaging. The music speaks of the variety, vitality and optimism of the American spirit. Not exactly a patriotic work, it nevertheless conveys a respect, even a reverence, for the past and future of America." He added, "Schoenberg clearly knows how to orchestrate, and I am sure we have not heard the last of him."

== Recording ==
A recording of the American Symphony featuring the Kansas City Symphony under the direction of Michael Stern was released through Reference Recordings on January 20, 2017. The album also includes performances of Schoenberg's Finding Rothko (2006) and Picture Studies (2012).
