= Picture Studies =

Picture Studies is an orchestral suite by the American composer Adam Schoenberg. The work was commissioned by the Kansas City Symphony and the Nelson-Atkins Museum of Art. It was first performed by the Kansas City Symphony conducted by Michael Stern at the Kauffman Center for the Performing Arts in Kansas City on February 1, 2013.

== Composition ==
=== Background ===
Schoenberg received the commission for Picture Studies in November 2011 from the Kansas City Symphony and the Nelson-Atkins Museum of Art, with the request that he write "a 21st-century Pictures at an Exhibition" based on pieces from their collection. Schoenberg was immediately taken by the idea and visited the museum three times over the course of six months to conceptualize the work.

Ultimately, eight of Picture Studies's movements would be based on four paintings, three photographs, and one sculpture—all by different artists. The works that inspired the movements are, respectively, Albert Bloch's painting "The Three Pierrots No. 2," Kurt Baasch photograph "Repetition," Vincent van Gogh's painting "Olive Orchard," Wassily Kandinsky's painting "Rose with Gray," Alexander Calder's sculpture "Untitled, 1937," Joan Miró's painting "Women at Sunrise," Hiroshi Sugimoto photograph "Atlantic Ocean, Cliffs of Moher," and Francis Blake's photograph "Pigeons in Flight."

=== Structure ===
Picture Studies has a duration of approximately 27 minutes and is cast in ten movements:

1. Intro
2. Three Pierrots
3. Repetition
4. Olive Orchard
5. Kandinsky
6. Calder's World
7. Miró
8. Interlude
9. Cliffs of Moher
10. Pigeons in Flight

=== Instrumentation ===
The work is scored for a large orchestra consisting of three flutes (second and third doubling piccolo), three oboes (third doubling cor anglais), three clarinets (second doubling E-flat clarinet, third doubling bass clarinet), three bassoons (third doubling contrabassoon), four horns, three trumpets, three trombones, tuba, harp, piano (doubling celesta), timpani, three percussionists, and strings.

== Reception ==
Reviewing the world premiere, the music critic Timothy L. McDonald of The Kansas City Star highly praised the piece, remarking, "Schoenberg's work is a gem, employing a broad palette of orchestral colors and musical forms. Even within individual movements, the music is kaleidoscopic, with ever-changing colors and textures." McDonald continued, "Whether the sensuous melody of the 'Olive Orchard,' the jaunty whimsicality of 'The Three Pierrots' or the explosive rhythmic brutality of 'Kandinsky,' Picture Studies captured a remarkable variety of moods."

== Recording ==
A recording of the Picture Studies featuring the Kansas City Symphony under the direction of Michael Stern was released through Reference Recordings on January 20, 2017. The album also includes performances of Schoenberg's Finding Rothko (2006) and American Symphony (2011).
