= Manitoba Chamber Orchestra =

Canadian orchestra

- Orchestra
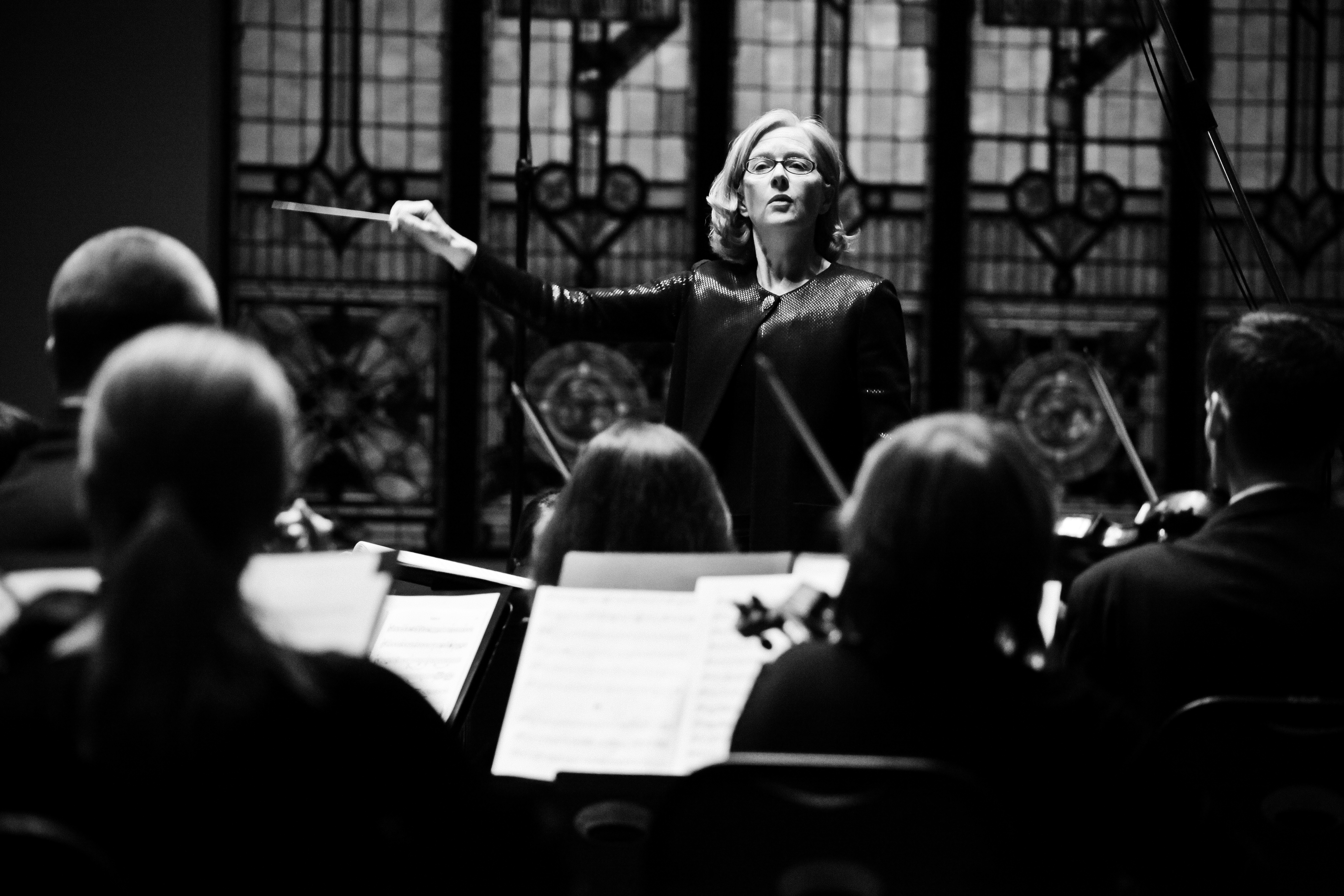
- Anne Manson conducting the orchestra in 2014
- Short name: MCO
- Founded: 1972
- Location: Winnipeg, Manitoba, Canada
- Principal conductor: Anne Manson
- Website: themco.ca

The Manitoba Chamber Orchestra (MCO) is a chamber orchestra based in Winnipeg, Manitoba, Canada. It offers an annual subscription series at Westminster United Church, which regularly features Canada's leading soloists, such as James Ehnes and Measha Brueggergosman, and Marc-André Hamelin. Other core MCO activities include recording, touring, and engaging extensive outreach in remote communities in northern Manitoba. Currently, Anne Manson serves as the MCO's Music Director, Karl Stobbe as its Concertmaster, and Vicki Young as its managing director.

== History ==
The Manitoba Chamber Orchestra was founded in 1972 by Ruben Gurevich. Gurevich served as music director and principal conductor until 1981. After a season of guest conductors, English conductor Simon Streatfeild, a founding member of the prestigious London-based chamber orchestra, the Academy of St. Martin in the Fields, was appointed music director and principal conductor in 1982. He was succeeded by another English conductor, Roy Goodman (2000–2005), and then by Anne Manson, who began her tenure in 2008.

In 1984, the MCO assumed the then recently disbanded CBC Winnipeg Orchestra's Candlelight Concerts series, which was broadcast nationally on CBC Radio. Canadians across the country and fans around the world continue to enjoy the orchestra online and in frequent broadcasts of its recordings.

In 1988, the orchestra represented Manitoba at the Winter Olympics in Calgary, Alberta. The MCO toured southern Italy in August 1999, and British Columbia twice: in the spring of 2003, and in the autumn of 2009 together with the celebrated percussion soloist, Dame Evelyn Glennie. The MCO toured with Glennie a second time in the fall of 2016, with stops in Ontario and Quebec.

The MCO accompanied k.d. lang in her performance of Leonard Cohen's "Hallelujah" at the Juno Awards in April 2005. In the summer of 2008, it made its debut appearance at the National Arts Centre in Ottawa. In the autumn of 2008, the orchestra accompanied the Armenian/Canadian soprano Isabel Bayrakdarian on a tour to San Francisco and Orange County (California), Vancouver, Toronto, Boston (Massachusetts), and New York, which culminated in a concert at Carnegie Hall.

In January 2018, the MCO presented the Canadian premiere of Philip Glass's third piano concerto. It was performed with American pianist Simone Dinnerstein, and co-commissioned as the inaugural instalment in the MCO's three-year New Concerto Project.

In 1995, the MCO released its first compact disc, on Sweden's BIS label. Canadian Music for Chamber Orchestra marked the first recording by a North American orchestra for the prestigious company. It was distributed in more than 45 countries. There have been eight subsequent CDs, four of them with CBC Records. A new disc recorded with Dame Evelyn Glennie, was released in 2017. The orchestra has received three nominations for JUNO Awards: in 1999 for A Britten Serenade; and in 2005 for So much to tell, which has sold nearly 10 thousand copies, and in 2013 for Troubadour and the Nightingale.

In June 2017, the MCO premiered Nanabush and the drum / Nanabozho et le tambour, a theatrical collaboration with Théâtre Cercle Molière. The bilingual work is based on new music by Michael Oesterle and a script by Rhéal Cenerini, and explores the relationship between a French coureur de bois, a First Nations woman, and Nanabush, the Anishinaabe trickster figure.

In October 2019, the MCO were named Classical Artist / Ensemble of the Year at the Western Canadian Music Awards. They were nominated for the same award in 2020. In the same year, the MCO launched MCO at Home – an online music hub presenting new and classic MCO performances – to better stay connected with its audiences during the COVID-19 pandemic.

In 2022, the MCO is celebrating their 50th anniversary season, presenting 10 in-person shows and 6 online programs.

== Education and outreach ==
Over the past two decades, the MCO has expanded its core activities to include a variety of outreach and education programs. Among them are Fiddlers on the Loose, which sends six musicians to remote communities in northern Manitoba every year to deliver workshops and concerts; regular performances at Stony Mountain Penitentiary; the MCO's participation in Artists in Healthcare, which sees MCO-affiliated musicians performing in hospitals throughout Winnipeg, Manitoba; the creation of student concerts and educational listening guides; and donating of concert tickets to underserved communities.

== Guest artists ==
Among the many soloists and ensembles who have appeared with the MCO, or under its auspices, are James Ehnes, Jan Lisiecki, Tracy Dahl, Measha Brueggergosman, Andriana Chuchman, Dame Evelyn Glennie, Marc-André Hamelin, Janina Fialkowska, Angela Hewitt, André Laplante, Liona Boyd, Jon Kimura Parker, Emma Kirkby, Zara Nelsova, Yannick Nézet-Séguin, the Winnipeg Singers, the university (of Manitoba) Singers, the Winnipeg Philharmonic Choir, and local high school choirs. The orchestra also presents regular concerts of small ensemble works, involving either local musicians or such international ensembles as the Borodin, Guarneri, and Tokyo String Quartets, and the Beaux Arts Trio.

The orchestra's repertoire ranges from the baroque to the contemporary. Among the composers the MCO has commissioned are Nahre Sol, Larry Strachan, Cris Derksen, Kevin Lau, Christos Hatzis, Jim Hiscott, Serouj Kradjian, Harry Freedman, Jocelyn Morlock, Michael Matthews, Luke Nickel, Heidi Ouellette, John Estacio, Randolph Peters, Glenn Buhr, Andrew Balfour, Stewart Goodyear, Michael Oesterle, Jeffrey Ryan, Dorothy Chang, Heather Schmidt, Karen Sunabacka, Sid Robinovitch, Alan Heard, Alexina Louie, Robert Turner, Gary Kulesha, Stephen Chatman, Donald Steven, Mark Hand, Norman Sherman, and Chan Ka Nin, and Malcolm Forsyth, who called the MCO's premiere of his cantata Evangeline "one of the supreme moments of my life as an artist, and one I am sure will continue to be so for the rest of my life."

Under founding music director and conductor, Ruben Gurevich, the orchestra established its ongoing practice of presenting many contemporary works, including over 100 Winnipeg premieres in its first five seasons. At the biennial meeting of the Association of Canadian Orchestras in 1990, the MCO was presented with a SOCAN Award of Merit for "the imaginative programming of contemporary Canadian music."

Violinist Aisslinn Nosky is the current MCO Guest Artist-In-Residence, in which capacity singer Measha Brueggergosman precedes her. Kevin Lau is the MCO Composer in Residence.

== Music directors ==
- Ruben Gurevich (1972–1981)
- Simon Streatfeild (1982–2000)
- Roy Goodman (2002–2005)
- Anne Manson (2008–present)

== Discography ==
- Cello Concerto
  Anne Manson, conductor
  Ariel Barnes, percussion
  MCO Records (2019)
- Mirage? Concertos for Percussion
  Anne Manson, conductor
  Dame Evelyn Glennie, percussion
  MCO Records (2018)
- Troubadour and the Nightingale
  Anne Manson, conductor
  Isabel Bayrakdarian, soprano
  MCO Records (2013)
- Philip Glass
  Symphony No. 3; Suite from The Hours
  Anne Manson, conductor Michael Riesman, piano
  Orange Mountain Music omm 0084 (2013)
- So Much to Tell
  Roy Goodman, conductor
  Measha Brueggergosman, soprano
  CBC Records SMCD5234
- Sea Sketches
  Roy Goodman, conductor
  CBC Records SMCD5227
- Gerald Finzi: Meditation
  Simon Streatfeild, conductor
  Valdine Anderson, soprano
  Russell Braun, baritone
  James Campbell, clarinet
  CBC Records SMCD5204
- A Britten Serenade
  Simon Streatfeild, conductor
  Benjamin Butterfield, tenor
  Henriette Schellenberg, soprano
  James Sommerville, French horn
  CBC Records SMCD5187
- 25th Anniversary Limited Edition Live Recording
  Simon Streatfeild, conductor
  Independent 1997
- Canadian Music for Chamber Orchestra
  Simon Streatfeild, conductor
  David Stewart, violin
  Vincent Ellin, bassoon
  BIS Records CD698

== See also ==
- Winnipeg Symphony Orchestra
