= Michael Matthews (composer) =

- Michael Matthews at his home in Berlin in 2021

Background information
- Born: August 28, 1950 (age 76); Gander, Newfoundland, Canada
- Occupations: Professor, composer, photographer
- Years active: 1970–present
- Website: michaelmatthews.net michaelmatthewsphotography.com

Michael Matthews, born August 28, 1950, is a Canadian composer and photographer. He completed a Ph.D. in composition at North Texas State University in 1985. He is a Fellow of the Royal Society of Canada and works in Victoria, British Columbia.

Matthews' abstract photographs have been exhibited in Germany and the US. Canadian publisher At Bay Press has published Gibbous Moon, a book of photography and poetry created in collaboration with poet Dennis Cooley.

== Early life ==
Michael Matthews was born in Gander, Newfoundland in 1950. At that time his father John Matthews was working for KLM Royal Dutch Airlines as a ground operations manager. Matthews was still an infant when his family moved to Miami, Florida, where his father took a job with Pan Am. Growing up, Matthews lived in Miami, Kingston, Jamaica, Managua Nicaragua, Port of Spain and Piarco, Trinidad, and Karachi, Pakistan, where he attended and graduated from the Karachi American School (KAS). A year at Purdue University studying aeronautical engineering followed, and then a move to Los Angeles, where he changed his focus to music. After earning his Ph.D. in composition and conducting, Matthews took a nine-month teaching appointment in Winnipeg at the University of Manitoba. This was followed by two years of teaching at Mokwon University in Taejon, Korea, and then a return to Canada to take up a tenure-track faculty position as head of the Composition Department at the University of Manitoba School of Music (currently the Desautels Faculty of Music).

== Education ==
His composition teachers included Larry Austin at the University of North Texas College of Music (formerly North Texas State University), Ben Glovinsky at California State University Sacramento and Aurelio de la Vega at California State University Northridge.

== Career ==
From 1985 to 2012, Matthews was head of the composition department at the Marcel A. Desautels Faculty of Music at the University of Manitoba in Winnipeg; he is now a professor emeritus there. Matthews is a conductor and a founder and artistic director of the GroundSwell new music series in Winnipeg. From 2002 to 2004 he was Composer-in-Residence with the Saskatoon Symphony Orchestra.

Matthews is a member of the Canadian Electroacoustic Community, of the Canadian League of Composers and an Associate Composer of the Canadian Music Centre.

== Selected Compositions ==
Matthews' works are published by the Canadian Music Centre and by Universal Edition.

- it is raining gently with light for cl/b.cl.vn.pf. Commissioned by GroundSwell and Madeline Hildebrand (2021)
- till our bodies into the night slip for cl/b.cl.vc.pf. Commissioned by SOLI Chamber Ensemble (2020)
- perishable light for viola/viola d'amore and percussion. Commissioned by Park Sounds (2019)
- Septet for fl.ob.cl/b.cl.sax.vn.vc.pf. Commissioned by ensemble mosaik (2016)
- Sólo queda el desierto for soprano and chamber orchestra. Commissioned by the Montreal Chamber Orchestra (2014)
- and the sky caught for clarinet (bass clarinet), viola and piano (2012)
- String Quartet No. 4 Commissioned by the Penderecki String Quartet (2011)
- Six Poems of Novic Tadić for Mezzo Soprano and Chamber Orchestra (2008)
- El Viento Helado for Woodwind Quintet (2007)
- De Reflejo a Fulgor for Piano and Tape (2007)
- Einklang for two Pianos (2007)
- Night Music for Violin and Piano (2007)
- The Language of Water for String Orchestra (2006)
- The Skin of Night for Saxophone and Piano (2006)
- 3 Duos (Book I) for violin and viola (2005)
- String Quartet No. 3 (2005)
- Symphony No. 3 (2005)
- Prince Kaspar Chamber Opera based on a libretto by Per Brask (2005)
- Piano Quartet (2004)
- Away, Tear Away for Woodwind Quintet and Tape (2003)
- Las Blancas Sombras for Voice and Guitar (2003)
- String Quartet No. 2 (2003)
- Particles of One for Violin and Chamber Orchestra (2002)
- Prelude to Macbeth for Orchestra (2002)
- Hommage à György Kurtág for 2 Violins and 2 Celli (2002)
- Song Fragments for Cello and Piano (2002)
- Symphony No. 2 (2001)
- On the Outer Edge for Tape (2001)
- Vertical Garden for Flute and Tape (2001)
- Wondering for viola solo (2001)
- Concerto for Cello (2001)
- Miniatures for String Quartet (2000)
- Fantasy/Nocturne for Piano (1999)
- String Quartet No. 1 (1999)
- . . . of the rolling worlds for Bass Clarinet and Tape (1999)
- Ernst Toller: Requiem for an Idea for Cello and Actor (1999)
- Partita — Images/Fragments for Violin and Piano (1999)
- Into the Page of Night for Orchestra (1998)
- Concerto for Piano (1998)
- Lorca Sketches for String Orchestra (1997)
- Postlude for Piano (1997)
- Symphony No. 1 (1997)
- Two Interludes for Orchestra (1996)
- Deux chansons d'amour for Voice and Piano (1996)
- Night Prairie for SATB Choir (1995)
- In Emptiness, Over Emptiness for Soprano and Tape (1994)
- Two Night Pieces for four Male Voices (1994)
- Layerings for Vibraphone and Tape (1993)
- Scattered Mirrors for Piano (1993)
- Out of the Earth for Soprano and Chamber Ensemble (1993)
- Between the Wings of the Earth for Chamber Orchestra (1993)
- Rooms of Light for SATB Choir (1992)
- Four Songs of Japan for soprano, viola and fortepiano (1991)
- Landscape for Piano and String Orchestra (1990)
- Of Time and Sky for Piano (1990)
- The First Sea for Bass Clarinet and Tape (1989)
- Wind Sketches for Wind Octet (1988)
- The Far Field for Orchestra (1987)
- Fantasy for Violin (1985)

== Selected recordings ==
Composer in the Computer Age – II. Various artists. Centaur Records, CD-CRC 2193, 1994. Includes Matthews: The First Sea.

Canadian Music for Chamber Orchestra. Manitoba Chamber Orchestra, cond. Simon Streatfeild. BIS Records, BISCD698, 1995. Includes Matthews: Between the Wings of the Earth.

Two Canadian Masterworks for Piano. Peter Vinograde (piano). CBC Records, 1995. Includes Matthews: Of Time and Sky.

Out of the Earth: Music of Michael Matthews. Therese Costes, Virko Baley, Kyiv Camerata. Troppe Note/Cambria Records, 1999.

Cult Figures. Various artists. Centrediscs, CMCCD13908, 2012. Includes Matthews: On the Outer Edge.

Rubbing Stone. Centrediscs, 2006. Includes Matthews: The Skin of Night.

Preludes and Bagatelles. Daan Vandewalle (piano). Ravello Records, RR7819, 2011.

Metropolis. Various performers. Ravello Records, RR7889, 2014. Includes Matthews: The Skin of Night.

String Quartets Nos. 2 and 3; Miniatures. Clearwater String Quartet, Ravello Records RR7910, 2015.

Bloody Jack. Dawn Bruch-Wiens, Laura Loewen. Navona Records, NV6589, 2024.

== Bibliography ==
Carrabré, Pat. "Sounding Language: The Music of Michael Matthews", Border Crossings, Vol.7, No.2, pp. 42–43, "The Royal Winnipeg Ballet" (#26), Manitoba: Border Crossings (magazine), April 1988.

MacMillan, Rick. “Michael Matthews”, Encyclopedia of Music in Canada, 2nd ed. Ed. Helmut Kallmann and Gilles Potvin. Toronto: University of Toronto Press, 1992. ISBN 978-0-802-02881-5

Annual Report, "Presenting and Commissioning", p. 97, National Endowment for the Arts, 1994. ISBN 978-0-253-06755-5

Kuhn, Laura, "Michael Matthews", Baker's Biographical Dictionary of Twentieth-Century Classical Musicians, Nicolas Slonimsky, author, Laura Kuhn and Dennis McIntire, eds. New York: Schirmer Books, 1997. ISBN 978-0-028-71271-0

Composer Genealogies, Scott Pfitzinger, author, Maryland: Rowman & Littlefield Publishers, 2017. ISBN 978-1-442-27225-5

The Symphonic Repertoire, Volume V: "The Symphony in the Americas"; Katherine Baber, E. Douglas Bomberger, J. Peter Burkholder, Carol A. Hess, Susan Key, Drew Massey, Matthew Mugmon, Douglas Shadle, authors; A. Peter Brown, Brian Hart, editors; Indiana: Indiana University Press, 2024. ISBN 978-0-253-06755-5
