= Concert Companion =

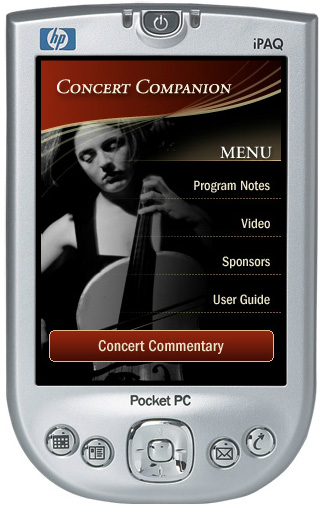
A rendering of the Concert Companion software running on the HP iPaq PDA device. Depicted is the home screen at opening.

The Concert Companion was a hand-held device intended to enhance concert experiences by presenting information that complements the music while the music is being performed. Using wireless technology, the Concert Companion delivered explanatory text, program notes and video images in real time with the music. The Concert Companion was developed under the auspices of the Kansas City Symphony by former executive director Roland Valliere.

== Testing ==
Testing of the Concert Companion took place with the New York Philharmonic, Philadelphia Orchestra, Pittsburgh Symphony, Aspen Music Festival, Kansas City Symphony and Oakland East Bay Symphony. It was featured at The Wall Street Journal's "D: All Things Digital" executive conference in Carlsbad, California in June 2004, and at the Association of British Orchestras Conference in Birmingham, England in February 2005.

== Media coverage ==
Feature articles about the Concert Companion appeared across the United States in The New York Times, The Wall Street Journal, USA Today, San Francisco Classical Voice, Orlando Sentinel, Gizmodo, The Baltimore Sun, PC World Magazine, and internationally in The Guardian, and Heise Online. Feature segments aired on National Public Radio All Things Considered, and internationally on BBC News and the Canadian Broadcasting Corporation (CBC).

== Funding ==
Funding for the Concert Companion was received from the William and Flora Hewlett Foundation, John S. and James L. Knight Foundation, the Andrew W. Mellon Foundation and the David and Lucile Packard Foundation.
