= National Repertory Orchestra =

American summer symphony orchestra

- Full-fellowship summer orchestra and academy
- Former name: Blue Jeans Symphony (1960–66); Colorado Philharmonic Orchestra (1966–86)
- Founded: 1960 by Walter Charles
- Location: Breckenridge, Colorado
- Concert hall: Riverwalk Center
- Music director: Michael Stern
- Website: nromusic.org

The National Repertory Orchestra (NRO) is an American summer symphony orchestra that offers full fellowships to train young professional musicians for careers in music through performances, masterclasses and workshops. Based in Breckenridge, Colorado since 1993, its members, who range in age from 18 to 29, are selected from auditions held each year throughout the United States. NRO presents a summer music festival including two orchestral programs per week conducted by its music director, Michael Stern. The orchestra was founded in 1960 by cellist and conductor Walter Charles. Carl Topilow was music director from 1978 to 2020 and continues with the orchestra as the music advisor. The NRO was formerly known as the Blue Jeans Symphony based in Estes Park, Colorado, and later as the Colorado Philharmonic Orchestra based in Evergreen, Colorado.

== History ==
=== Blue Jeans Symphony, 1960-1966 ===
The National Repertory Orchestra was founded as the Blue Jeans Symphony in 1960 by cellist and conductor Walter Charles. It was originally based in the summer resort town of Estes Park, Colorado. Charles had conceived the idea for an intensive summer training camp for aspiring orchestral musicians in the 1950s when he was the conductor of the Wichita Falls Symphony Orchestra and chose Estes Park after vacationing there with his wife. The program was launched with 55 musicians and a $2000 grant from the town's chamber of commerce. In its early days, the young musicians worked all day in jobs at the resort and rehearsed from 10 p.m. to midnight. This was a requirement for all the musicians, regardless of their ability to pay for their room and board, and one which Charles described at the time as "part of the philosophical training of the Blue Jeans program." The orchestra performed their concerts in blue jeans, and Charles conducted in a denim white tie and tails especially made for him by Levi-Strauss.

=== Colorado Philharmonic Orchestra, 1966-1986 ===
The program became increasingly successful in attracting students and looked to attracting a wider audience. In 1966, it changed its name to the Colorado Philharmonic Orchestra and moved to Evergreen, Colorado. At the end of the 1977 season, a disagreement between Charles and the orchestra's board of directors led to his dismissal. The board had disagreed with his emphasis on classical music and wanted to broaden the repertoire to include lighter music. After a restructuring in 1978, the conductor and clarinettist Carl Topilow was appointed music director and conductor. The orchestra hired its first business manager and placed an emphasis on stipends and scholarships which allowed the students twelve-hour days devoted to practising, rehearsing and performing in concerts. In addition to the classical concerts, they also began giving concerts which depended heavily on pops programming in open meadows, city streets, shopping centers and parks. In 1985, the orchestra performed at the Kennedy Center in a concert celebrating the 20th anniversary of the National Endowment for the Arts in a varied program of 20th-century music that included Billy Taylor playing his own Jazz Suite for Piano and Orchestra, Joel Hoffman's serial piece Between Ten, and Aaron Copland's A Lincoln Portrait.

=== National Repertory Orchestra, 1986-1993 ===
By the mid-1980s, the orchestra's ambitions had grown beyond the point where it could be sustained by the small town of Evergreen. The increasingly peripatetic performances at Evergreen led to the Denver Post calling them "the guerilla orchestra" because they never knew where they would be playing next. According to Richard Zellner who served as the orchestra's executive director from 1982 until 2000, "we were a festival looking for a place to happen." In 1986, the orchestra changed its name to the National Repertory Orchestra, drew up new articles of incorporation, and accepted an offer by Keystone Resort, in Keystone, Colorado to take up residency there. The orchestra provided an entertainment draw for the resort and the resort provided room and board for the musicians, a performing tent, and marketing services, all of which allowed the orchestra to halve its expenses. In 1988, the NRO was the only American orchestra invited to perform at the Seoul Olympics and then extended its tour to Taiwan and Japan.

The Riverwalk Center in Breckenridge, Colorado, the NRO's performance base since 1993

=== National Repertory Orchestra, 1993-present ===
The orchestra, conducted by Gilbert Levine, performed in Denver to mark Pope John Paul II's visit for World Youth Day in 1993. That same year it had relocated to Breckenridge, Colorado following the town's invitation to become part of its summer Breckenridge Music Festival. Since that time, the Riverwalk Center, a 750-seat facility on the shores of the Blue River, has been the NRO's main performance base.

== Program ==
The NRO is a non-profit organization supported by private and corporate sponsorships as well as grants from the National Endowment for the Arts. Each year the orchestra's 88 members, who all attend on fellowships, are chosen from auditions by approximately 900 young musicians between the ages of 18 and 29 who must have completed at least one year of college, university, or conservatory. The program lasts eight weeks during which the members learn and perform an entire season's orchestral repertoire. The orchestra gives two full orchestral concerts a week at the Riverwalk Center in Breckenridge and performs at events and concerts in various other towns in Colorado. The NRO musicians also attend masterclasses with visiting musicians, participate in the orchestra's education and community outreach programs, and take career development classes which include mock auditions, contract negotiations, finance for musicians, and training in music therapy.

== Notable alumni ==
NRO alumni have gone on to significant careers as soloists or members of major orchestras include:

- Trombonist Joseph Alessi
- Cellist Phoebe Carrai
- Clarinetist Jonathan Cohler
- Harpist Yolanda Kondonassis
- Violinist Michaela Paetsch
- Violinist Elizabeth Pitcairn
- Bassoonist Robert S. Williams
