= Anne Manson =

American conductor

Anne Manson (born 1961, Cambridge, Massachusetts) is an American conductor.

== Biography ==
Manson studied viola and piano in her youth. She attended Harvard University from 1979 to 1983, with an initial intention to focus on a pre-medical curriculum. She graduated from Harvard and Radcliffe College with a focus on music. She subsequently won a Marshall Scholarship, which she used for music studies at the Royal College of Music (RCM). At the RCM, she studied conducting with Norman Del Mar.

In the UK, Manson founded and served as director of Mecklenburgh Opera from 1988 to 1996. In Europe, Manson became an assistant conductor to Claudio Abbado at the Vienna State Opera. In 1994, Manson conducted the Vienna Philharmonic at the Salzburg Festival in a performance of Boris Godunov, the first female conductor to conduct at the Salzburg Festival.

In North America, Manson was music director of the Kansas City Symphony from 1999 to 2003, the first female music director of the Kansas City Symphony. In 2008, Manson became music director of the Manitoba Chamber Orchestra, the first female music director in the orchestra's history. Manson has conducted several commercial recordings, including works of Philip Glass.

Manson and her husband have two sons.

Cultural offices
Preceded by William McGlaughlin	Music Director, Kansas City Symphony; 1999–2003	Succeeded by Michael Stern
Preceded by Roy Goodman	Music Director, Manitoba Chamber Orchestra; 2008–present	Succeeded by incumbent
