= Simon Streatfeild =

British-Canadian violist (1929–2019)

Simon Nicolas Streatfeild /ˈstrɛtfild/ (5 October 1929 – 7 December 2019) was a British-Canadian violist, conductor and teacher.

Simon Nicolas Streatfeild was born in Windsor, Berkshire, England in 1929. He studied viola with Frederick Riddle at the Royal College of Music from 1946 to 1950. He then played with the London Philharmonic Orchestra and Royal Opera Orchestra, Covent Garden, became Principal Viola with the Sadler's Wells Orchestra (1953–55) and the London Symphony Orchestra (1956–1965), and was a founding member of the Academy of St Martin in the Fields (1958–1965).

He moved to Canada, where he played various roles with the Vancouver Symphony Orchestra from 1965 to 1977: Principal Viola, Assistant Conductor, acting Music Director, and Associate Conductor.

Streatfeild was conductor of the Vancouver Bach Choir from 1969 to 1981. From 1977 to 1981 he was a visiting professor at the University of Western Ontario. He led the Regina Symphony Orchestra 1981–1984, overlapping the last year with his new post as conductor of the Quebec Symphony Orchestra (QSO) in July 1983, succeeding James DePreist and he left the QSO in 1991 over artistic differences. During his tenure the orchestra made its Toronto debut and its first commercial recordings.

He was also conductor of the Manitoba Chamber Orchestra (MCO) 1982–2000. In 1983 he led the MCO in the world premiere of Michael Matthews's work Between the Wings of the Earth.

In 2000 Streatfeild served as principal guest conductor and artistic advisor for Symphony Nova Scotia.

He regularly guest conducted in Canada, the US, the UK and Europe, and other places. He was Conductor of the Symphony Orchestra of the Norwegian Academy of Music in Oslo for ten years, where he was also Professor of Orchestral Conducting.

His recordings included music by Mahler, Berlioz, Shostakovich, Britten, Honegger, Messiaen and others.

In 1987 Streatfeild received a Canadian Music Council Medal for outstanding service to music in Canada.
