= Matthias Pintscher =

German composer and conductor (born 1971)

- Born: 29 January 1971 (age 55); Marl, North Rhine-Westphalia, Germany
- Education: Hochschule für Musik Detmold
- Occupations: Composer; Conductor; Academic teacher
- Organizations: Juilliard School; Kansas City Symphony
- Website: www.matthiaspintscher.com

Matthias Pintscher (born 29 January 1971) is a German composer, conductor and academic teacher.

== Biography ==
Pintscher was born in Marl, North Rhine-Westphalia. As a youth, he studied the violin and conducting. He began his music studies with Giselher Klebe in 1988 at the Hochschule für Musik Detmold in Detmold. In 1990, he met Hans Werner Henze, and in 1991 and 1992, he was invited to Henze's summer school in Montepulciano, Italy. He later studied with German composer and flutist Manfred Trojahn. He held a Daniel R. Lewis Young Composer Fellowship with the Cleveland Orchestra from 2000 to 2002.

In October 2010, Pintscher became the first Artist-in-Association with the BBC Scottish Symphony Orchestra. In June 2012, the Ensemble intercontemporain announced the appointment of Pintscher as its next music director, beginning in the 2013–2014 season. With the 2014–2015 season, Pintscher became artist-in-residence with the Danish Radio for a period of three years. For the 2014–2015 season, he was the artist-in-residence at the Cologne Philharmonie. Pintscher concluded his tenure with the Ensemble intercontemporain at the close of the 2022–2023 season.

In the United States, Pintscher first guest-conducted the Los Angeles Chamber Orchestra (LACO) in February 2016. He served as artist-in-residence with the LACO in 2018. In March 2023, Pintscher first guest-conducted the Kansas City Symphony. On the basis of this appearance, the Kansas City Symphony announced in May 2023 the appointment of Pintscher as its next music director, effective with the 2024–2025 season, with an initial contract of five seasons. In June 2026, the Kansas City Symphony announced the extension of Pintscher's contract as music director through the 2033–2034 season. In August 2026, the LACO announced the appointment of Pintscher as its next music director, effective with the 2027–2028 season, with an initial contract of four years. He is to hold the title of music director-designate of the LACO for the 2026–2027 season.

Since 2008, Pintscher has lived in New York City. He serves as a professor of composition at the Juilliard School.

== Published works ==
=== Piano ===
- Monumento I (1991)
- Tableau / Miroir (1992)
- Nacht. Mondschein (1994)
- on a clear day (2004)
- whirling tissue of light (2013)

=== Chamber music ===
- 2° quartetto d’archi (1990)
- Partita for solo cello (1991)
- Omaggio a Giovanni Paisiello for violin (1991, revised 1995)
- 4° quartetto d’archi "Ritratto di Gesualdo" (1992)
- Sieben Bagatellen mit Apotheose der Glasharmonika for bass clarinet (1993, revised 2001) or for clarinet (1994, revised 2001)
- Départ (Monumento III) for ensemble (1993, revised 1995)
- dernier espace avec introspecteur for accordion and cello (1994)
- Figura II / Frammento for string quartet (1997)
- Figura I for accordion and string quartet (1998)
- in nomine for solo viola (1999)
- Figura IV / Passaggio for string quartet (1999)
- Figura III for accordion (2000)
- Figura V / Assonanza for cello (2000)
- Janusgesicht for viola and cello (2001)
- Study I for Treatise on the Veil for violin and cello (2004)
- Study II for Treatise on the Veil for violin, viola and cello (2006)

=== Orchestral music ===
- Invocazioni (1991)
- Devant une neige (Monumento II) (1993)
- Dunkles Feld – Berückung (1993, revised 1998)
- Choc (Monumento IV) (1996)
- Five Orchestral Pieces (1997)
- sur "Départ" (2000)
- with lilies white (2001–02)
- Towards Osiris (2005)
- Verzeichnete Spur (2006)
- Osiris (2008)
- Mar'eh (2011)
- Ex Nihilo (2011)
- idyll (2014)
- neharot (2020)

=== Concertos ===
- La Metamorfosi di Narciso for cello and ensemble (1992)
- tenebrae for viola and small ensemble with live electronics (2000–2001)
- en sourdine for violin and orchestra (2003)
- Reflections on Narcissus for cello and orchestra (2005)
- Transir for flute and chamber orchestra (2006)
- Sonic Eclipse for solo trumpet, solo horn and ensemble (2009–2010)
- Chute d'Etoiles for 2 trumpets and orchestra (2012)
- Un despertar for cello and orchestra (2017)

=== Theatrical music ===
- Gesprungene Glocken (1993-1994, revised 2000)
- Thomas Chatterton, opera (1994–1998)
- L’espace dernier (2002–2003)
- Das Kalte Herz, opera (2026)

=== Voice ===
- Gesprungene Glocken for soprano and orchestra (1996)
- a twilight's song for soprano and seven instruments (1997)
- Music from "Thomas Chatterton" for baritone an orchestra (1998)
- Monumento V for eight voices, 3 cellos and ensemble (1998)
- Hérodiade Fragmente for soprano and orchestra (1999)
- Lieder und Schneebilder for soprano and piano (2000)
- Vers quelque part ... – façons de partir for women's voices and percussion (2000) or for women's voices, percussion, three cellos and live electronics (2001)
- She-Cholat Ahavah Ani (Shir ha-Shirim V) for mixed chorus a cappella (2008)
- songs from Solomon's Garden for baritone and chamber orchestra (2009)

Cultural offices
Preceded by Michael Stern	Music Director, Kansas City Symphony; 2024–present	Succeeded by incumbent
