= Adam Schoenberg =

American composer (born 1980)

- Born: November 15, 1980 (age 45); New Salem, Massachusetts, United States
- Occupations: Composer, academic

Adam Schoenberg (born November 15, 1980) is an American composer. A member of the Atlanta School of Composers, his works have been performed by numerous orchestras and ensembles in the U.S. Schoenberg was the 2010–2012 guest composer for the Aspen Music Festival, the 2012–2013 composer-in-residence for the Kansas City Symphony, the 2013–2014 composer-in-residence for the Lexington Philharmonic, and the 2015–2017 composer-in-residence for the Fort Worth Symphony. Schoenberg's honors include a 2009 and 2010 MacDowell Colony fellowship, the 2007 Morton Gould Young Composer Award from ASCAP, and the 2006 Charles Ives Prize from the American Academy of Arts & Letters.

A graduate of Oberlin Conservatory of Music, Schoenberg earned his master's degree and Doctor of Musical Arts from The Juilliard School, where he studied composition with John Corigliano and Robert Beaser and wrote his thesis about noted film composer Thomas Newman. While at Juilliard, Schoenberg was awarded the Palmer-Dixon Prize (for "Most Outstanding Composition"). A resident of Los Angeles, Schoenberg is assistant professor of Composition at Occidental College. He is married to playwright and screenwriter Janine Salinas Schoenberg.

== List of compositions ==
=== Orchestral ===
- Finding Rothko (2006) for chamber orchestra
- Up! (2010) for orchestra
- American Symphony (2011) for orchestra
- La Luna Azul (2012) for orchestra
- Picture Studies (2012) for orchestra
- Bounce (2013) for orchestra
- Canto (2014) for orchestra
- Scatter (2015) concerto for PROJECT Trio and orchestra
- Go (2016) for chamber orchestra
- Stars (2016) for orchestra
- Losing Earth (2019) percussion concerto
- Cool Cat (2023) for orchestra

=== Band ===
- "Symphony No. 2 - Migration" (2017) for wind ensemble
- "Finding Rothko" (2006/2017) for wind ensemble, transcribed by Lance Sample
- Rise (2018) for concert band
