= Never Have to Be Alone =

"Never Have To Be Alone"

Single by CeCe Winans

from the album Let Them Fall in Love
- Released: 2017
- Recorded: 2017
- Genre: R&B; soul; gospel
- Length: 3:47
- Label: Pure Springs Gospel
- Songwriter(s): Alvin Love III; Dwan Hill

Never Have to Be Alone is a song by American gospel singer CeCe Winans, released in 2017. The song earned the singer a Grammy Award for Best Gospel Performance/Song. The song is from the artist's Let Them Fall in Love album.
