= CBC Records =

Canadian record label owned and operated by the Canadian Broadcasting Corporation

- Parent company: Canadian Broadcasting Corporation
- Founded: 1966
- Defunct: 2008
- Status: Defunct
- Country of origin: Canada

CBC Records was a Canadian record label owned and operated by the Canadian Broadcasting Corporation, which distributed CBC programming, including live concert performances, in album and digital format(s). For much of its history, the label focused primarily on classical music and jazz, as well as tie-in albums to CBC Radio shows such as Royal Canadian Air Farce and Brave New Waves.

The division's origins were in the network's transcription service, which produced and distributed recordings of CBC radio and television programming prior to the 1960s. The CBC began releasing albums in 1966 under the CBC Records imprint in cooperation with commercial labels such as RCA Records, and established its own internal division, CBC Enterprises, in 1982 to directly release the albums as well as CBC-related books and videotapes. The label's primary mandate was to promote and distribute Canadian artists, including recordings by the Toronto Symphony Orchestra, the National Arts Centre Orchestra, Anton Kuerti, James Campbell, Maureen Forrester, Glenn Gould, Healey Willan, Angela Hewitt, Ben Heppner and Measha Brueggergosman. A smaller number of pop and rock albums were also released, including the CBC Radio 3 series of compilation albums.

Over the label's years of operation, its recordings won 25 Juno Awards.

The label's classical division was closed in 2008, around the same time as CBC Radio 2's repositioning from an almost entirely classical and jazz service to a predominantly adult album alternative format. The label's last classical release was Barber/Korngold/Walton: Violin Concertos, a recording by Bramwell Tovey and James Ehnes in conjunction with the Vancouver Symphony Orchestra which won the Grammy Award for Best Instrumental Soloist(s) Performance (with Orchestra) in 2008. A few pop-oriented projects remained in development, but the corporation's primary strategy shifted from releasing physical recordings to internet distribution technologies such as podcasting, online music sales and the 2012 launch of CBC Music.

The French-language side of the CBC, Radio-Canada, had its own counterpart, Les Disques SRC, which focused on French-language music. Recordings with cross-linguistic appeal among both anglophones and francophones were branded with both names, while recordings of interest to only one of the language communities were branded as one or the other.

== See also ==
- List of record labels
