= Michael Stern (conductor) =

American symphony conductor (born 1959)

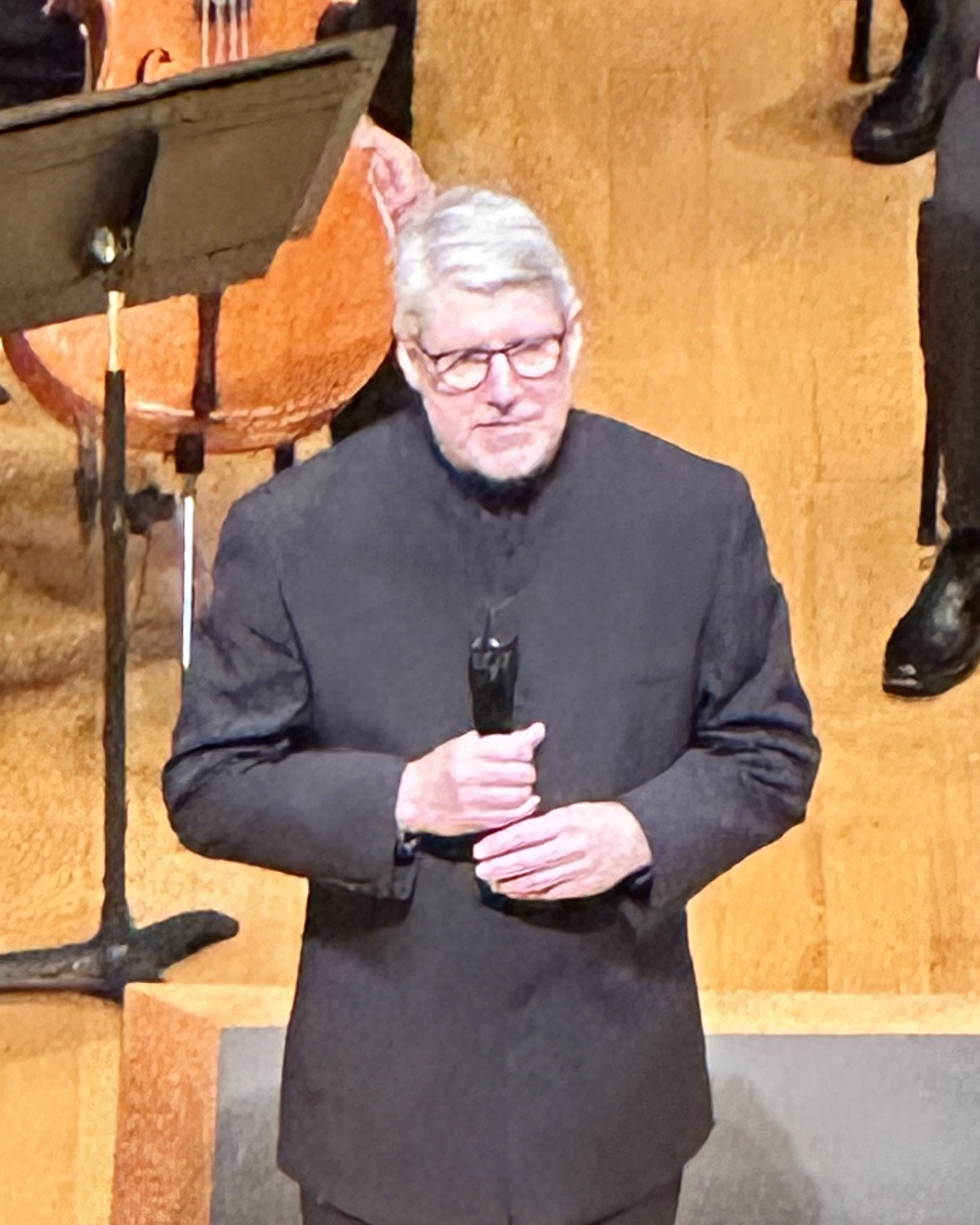
Stern speaking during his last performance as the music director of the Kansas City Symphony on June 23, 2024

Michael Stern (born 17 December 1959) is an American conductor. He is currently music director of the National Repertory Orchestra (Breckenridge, Colorado) and of Orchestra Lumos. He is artistic advisor to the Edmonton Symphony Orchestra and the Iris Collective. He is music director laureate of the Kansas City Symphony.

== Biography ==
Stern is the son of Vera Stern and the violinist Isaac Stern. He obtained his undergraduate degree in American history from Harvard College in 1981. Subsequently, he studied under conductor Max Rudolf at the Curtis Institute of Music in Philadelphia, graduating in 1986. Stern also studied for one summer at the Los Angeles Philharmonic Institute and for two summers at the Pierre Monteux Memorial School in Hancock, Maine.

Stern was an assistant conductor with The Cleveland Orchestra from 1986 to 1991. In September 1986, he debuted at the New York Philharmonic as one of three young conductors in a conducting workshop with Leonard Bernstein.

Stern has served as principal guest conductor of the Orchestre National de Lyon. From 1996 to 2000, Stern was chief conductor of the Rundfunk Sinfonieorchester Saarbrücken, the first American chief conductor in the orchestra's history. His work there is also notable for the orchestra's many recordings of American classical music during his tenure, including discs of works by Henry Cowell and Charles Ives.

In 2000, Stern founded the IRIS Orchestra in Germantown, Tennessee, an ensemble specialist in American contemporary music. He served as its music director until 2022, and is now advisor to the renamed ensemble, the IRIS Collective.

In 2005, Stern became music director of the Kansas City Symphony. During Stern's tenure in Kansas City, the orchestra moved to the Kauffman Center for the Performing Arts in 2011. In March 2014, Stern, the orchestra, and Engage Mobile Solutions used four pairs of Google Glass to record a performance of Beethoven's 5th Symphony. He served in the post through the 2023-2024 season, and is now music director laureate of the Kansas City Symphony.

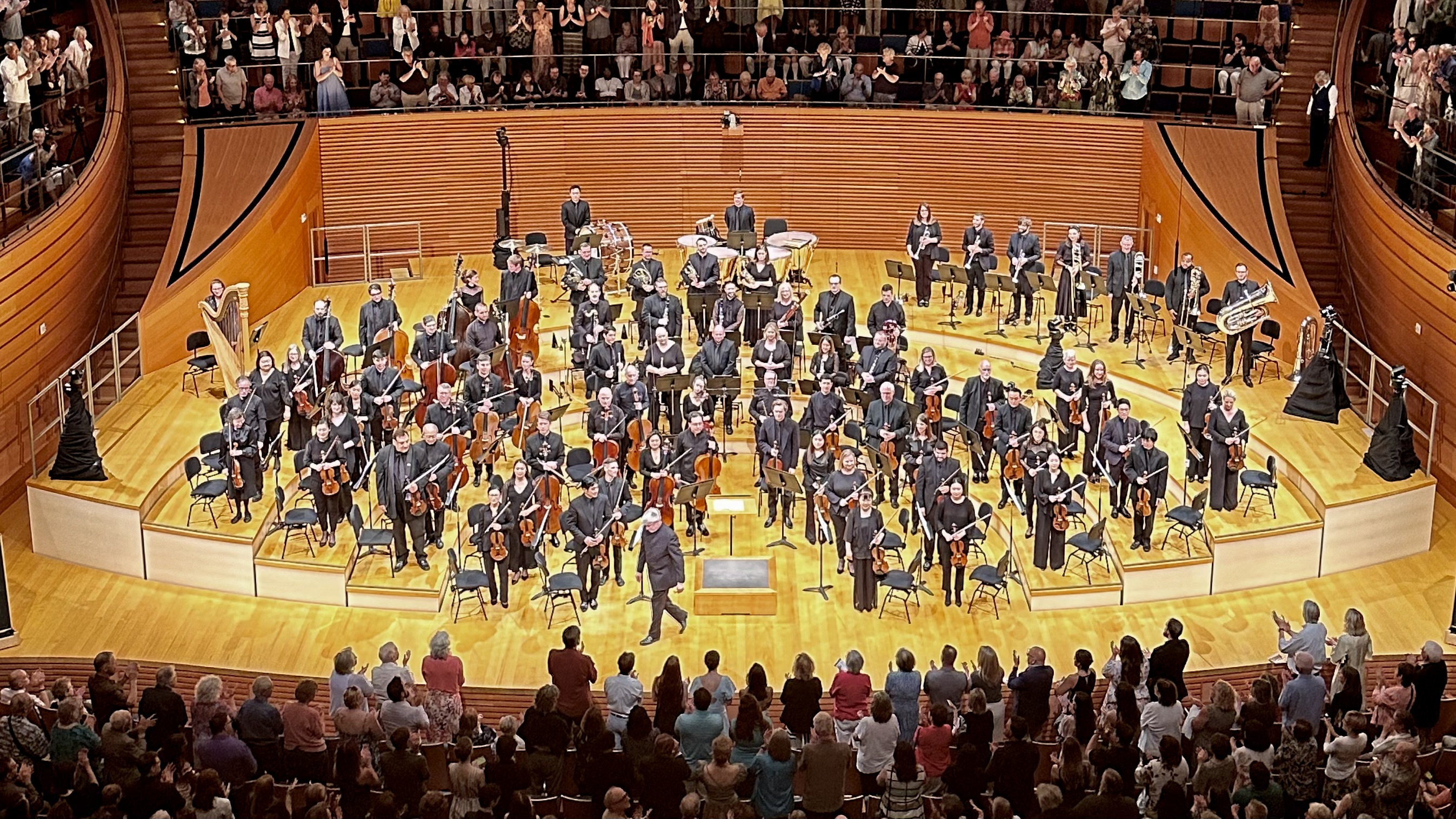
Stern's final performance as music director of the Kansas City Symphony on June 23, 2024

In 2019, the Stamford Symphony (renamed Orchestra Lumos in June 2022) appointed Stern as its next music director, effective with the 2020-2021 season, with an initial contract of five seasons. In January 2021, the National Repertory Orchestra (NRO) in Breckenridge, Colorado announced the appointment of Stern as its next music director.

Stern has been married twice. His first marriage was to the oboist Jeannette Bittar. The marriage ended in divorce. Stern's second marriage is to Shelly Cryer. The couple has two daughters and resides in Connecticut.

Cultural offices
Preceded by Marcello Viotti	Chief Conductor, Saarbrücken Radio Symphony Orchestra; 1996–2000	Succeeded by Günther Herbig
Preceded by Anne Manson	Music Director, Kansas City Symphony; 2005–2024	Succeeded by Matthias Pintscher
Preceded by Eckart Preu (Music Director, Stamford Symphony)	Music Director, Orchestra Lumos; 2020–present	Succeeded by incumbent
Preceded by Carl Topilow	Music Director, National Repertory Orchestra; 2021–present	Succeeded by incumbent
