= Kansas City Symphony =

American symphony orchestra

- Symphony orchestra
- Short name: KC Symphony
- Founded: 1982; 44 years ago
- Concert hall: Kauffman Center for the Performing Arts
- Principal conductor: Matthias Pintscher
- Website: www.kcsymphony.org

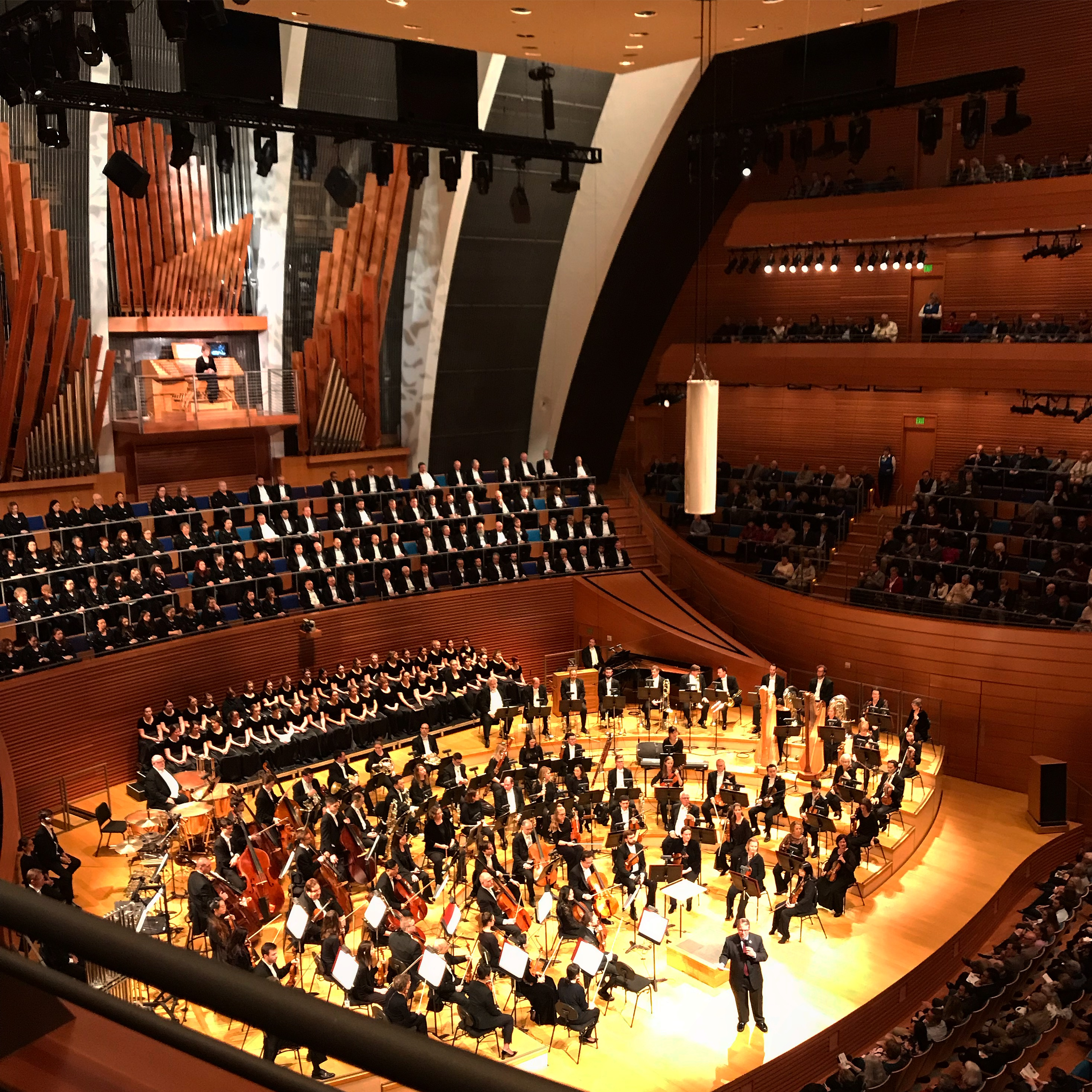
The Kansas City Symphony prepares to perform in Helzberg Hall at the Kauffman Center for the Performing Arts

The Kansas City Symphony (KCS) is an American symphony orchestra based in Kansas City, Missouri. The orchestra is resident at the Kauffman Center for the Performing Arts. The orchestra performs a 42-week season, and is also the accompanying orchestra for the Lyric Opera of Kansas City and the Kansas City Ballet.

The orchestra's current music director is Matthias Pintscher, as of the 2024–2025 season. Michael Stern, the orchestra's music director from 2005 to 2024, is music director laureate of the orchestra. Since July 2019, the orchestra's current executive director is Danny Beckley.

== History ==
In 1911, the first iteration of the Kansas City Symphony was formed for Carl Busch. The city's first symphony orchestra, it ceased operations at the start of World War I, as many of the musicians were sent to military service. Kansas City's second symphony orchestra was the Kansas City Philharmonic, founded in 1933 and dissolved in 1982. In the same year, businessman and philanthropist R. Crosby Kemper, Jr. and other Kansas City businessmen, including Hallmark Cards chairman and chief executive officer Donald J. Hall, Sr. and H&R Block co-founder Henry W. Bloch, provided funds for the formation of the second iteration of the Kansas City Symphony. The orchestra gave its concerts at the Lyric Theatre.

William McGlaughlin was music director from 1986 to 1997. During McGlaughlin's tenure, the orchestra released its first compact disc, American Voices, in 1995. From 1999 to 2003, Anne Manson was music director of the orchestra, the first female conductor to hold the post. During her tenure, in 2002, the orchestra participated in the development of the 'Concert Companion', led by then-executive director Roland Valliere. Funded by the William and Flora Hewlett Foundation, John S. and James L. Knight Foundation, the Andrew W. Mellon Foundation and the David and Lucile Packard Foundation, the Concert Companion was tested by the Kansas City Symphony, as well as the New York Philharmonic, Philadelphia Orchestra, Pittsburgh Symphony, Aspen Music Festival, and Oakland East Bay Symphony. The orchestra released a further album, The Sound of Kansas City, in 2004, derived from live performances by the orchestra recorded in 2002 and 2003.

In 2005, Michael Stern became music director of the orchestra. During Stern's tenure, the orchestra moved to the Kauffman Center for the Performing Arts in 2011. The orchestra and Stern have made several commercial recordings. These include a recording of Gordon Chin's Formosa Seasons on the Naxos label, and two settings for Shakespeare's Tempest (by Arthur Sullivan and Jean Sibelius) with Reference Recordings. The orchestra is also featured on the recording Britten's Orchestra (2009), a Vaughan Williams and Elgar disc from 2013, and a Hindemith, Prokofiev, and Bartók in 2014 also with Reference Recordings.

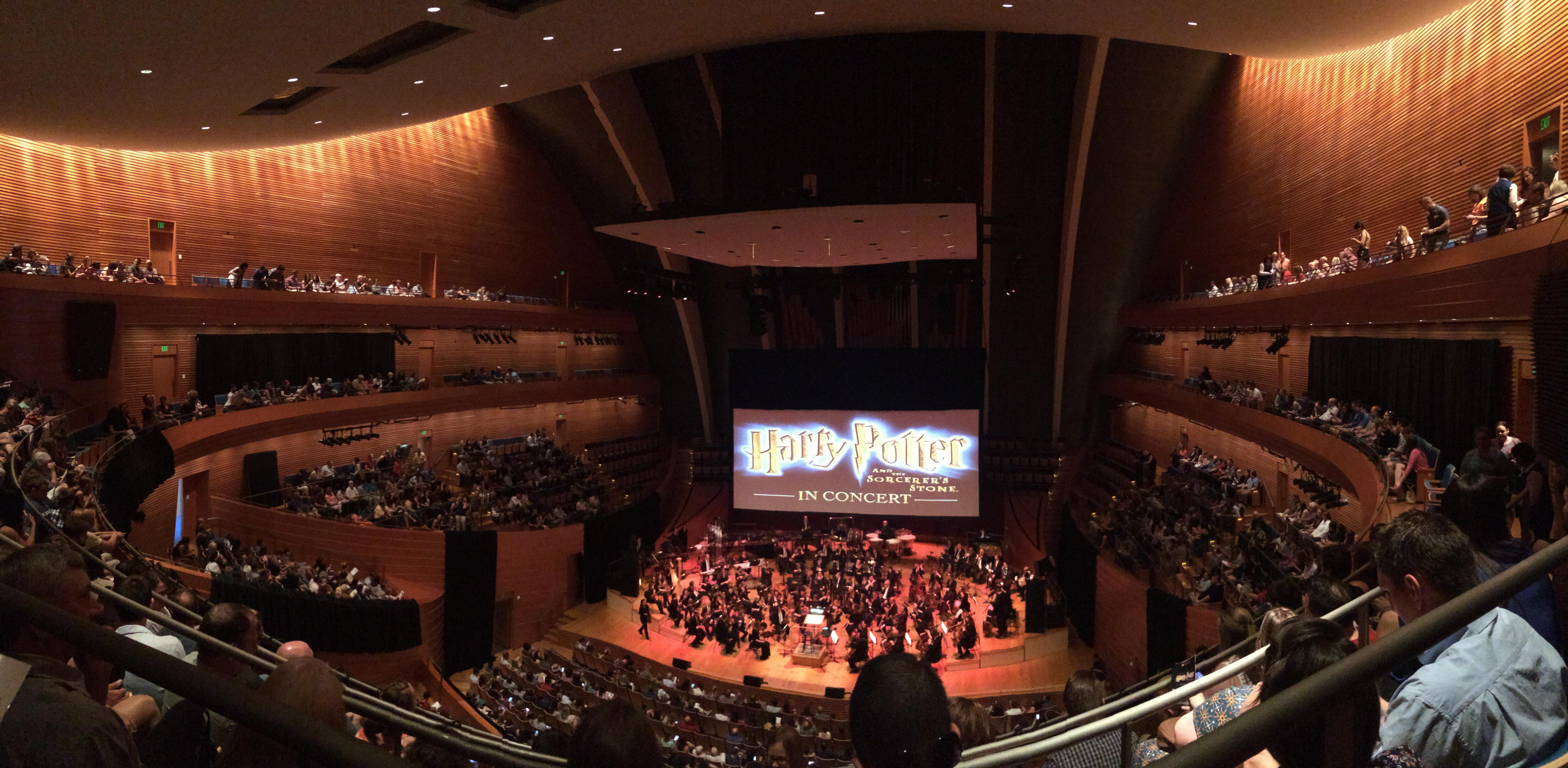
Harry Potter and the Sorcerer's Stone live with the Kansas City Symphony

In 2023, controversy arose after the orchestra denied tenure to Josh Jones, the orchestra's first Black tenure-track musician who had originally been appointed to the orchestra effective with the 2020–2021 season.

Stern concluded his tenure with the orchestra at the close of the 2023–2024 season, and now has the title of music director laureate of the orchestra.

In March 2023, Matthias Pintscher first guest-conducted the orchestra. On the basis of this appearance, in May 2023, the orchestra announced the appointment of Pintscher as its next music director, effective with the 2024–2025 season, with an initial contract of five seasons. In June 2026, the orchestra announced the extension of Pintscher's contract as music director through the 2033–2034 season.

== Music directors ==
- Russell Patterson (1982–1986)
- William McGlaughlin (1986–1997)
- Anne Manson (1999–2003)
- Michael Stern (2004–2024)
- Matthias Pintscher (2024–present)
