= 58th Annual Grammy Awards =

2016 US music awards ceremony

- Official poster
- Date: February 15, 2016
- Location: Staples Center, Los Angeles, California, U.S.
- Hosted by: LL Cool J

Highlights
- Most awards: Kendrick Lamar (5)
- Most nominations: Kendrick Lamar (11)
- Website: http://www.grammy.com/

Television/radio coverage
- Network: CBS
- Viewership: 24.9 million viewers

The 58th Annual Grammy Awards was held on February 15, 2016, at the Staples Center in Los Angeles. The ceremony recognizes the best recordings, compositions and artists of the eligibility year, which was from October 1, 2014, to September 30, 2015. The "pre-telecast" ceremony, officially known as the Premiere Ceremony, in which the majority of awards were presented, was held at the nearby Microsoft Theater. It was the 16th Grammy ceremony to be held at the Staples Center, tying the Shrine Auditorium, also in Los Angeles, for hosting the most Grammy ceremonies. It also marks the latest date for a Grammy ceremony since 2003, which was held on February 23.

Unlike previous years, where it was held on a Sunday, the 2016 edition was held on a Monday for the first time to take advantage of the U.S. Presidents' Day long weekend. The ceremony was televised in the United States by CBS; for the first time, CBS affiliates in the West Coast and United States territories outside the continental region, including Hawaii and Alaska, had the option of broadcasting the Grammys live from the East Coast feed, in addition to an encore in local primetime.

Nominations for the 58th Grammy Awards ceremony were announced on December 7, 2015, returning to the traditional format of an immediate press conference/release reveal of all nominees rather than the "all-day event" unveiling attempted by The Recording Academy and CBS over the previous few years. Kendrick Lamar received the most nominations with 11, and became the rapper with the most nominations in a single night, and second overall behind Michael Jackson (12 nominations in 1984). Taylor Swift and The Weeknd received seven nominations each. Producer Max Martin received the most nominations for a non-performing artist, with six. LL Cool J hosted for the fifth consecutive year. As part of a commercial break on the U.S. broadcast paid for by Target, Gwen Stefani also presented a live music video for her new single "Make Me Like You".

Kendrick Lamar led the winners with five trophies, including Best Rap Album for To Pimp a Butterfly. Taylor Swift won three awards, including Album of the Year for 1989, becoming the first female artist to win Album of the Year twice as main credited artist. Alabama Shakes also won three including Best Alternative Music Album for Sound & Color. Ed Sheeran won two including Song of the Year for "Thinking Out Loud". Mark Ronson and Bruno Mars' "Uptown Funk" won for Record of the Year and Meghan Trainor won for Best New Artist.

== Performers ==
Artist(s)	Song(s)
Taylor Swift	"Out of the Woods"
Carrie Underwood; Sam Hunt	"Take Your Time" "Heartbeat"
The Weeknd	"Can't Feel My Face" "In the Night"
Ellie Goulding; Andra Day	"Love Me like You Do" "Rise Up"
John Legend; Demi Lovato; Luke Bryan; Meghan Trainor; Tyrese Gibson; Lionel Richie	Tribute to Lionel Richie "Easy" "Hello" "Penny Lover" "You Are" "Brick House" "All Night Long (All Night)"
Little Big Town	"Girl Crush"
Stevie Wonder; Pentatonix	Tribute to Maurice White "That's the Way of the World"
Eagles; Bernie Leadon; Jackson Browne	Tribute to Glenn Frey "Take It Easy"
Tori Kelly; James Bay	"Hollow" "Let It Go"
The cast of Hamilton	"Alexander Hamilton" (Live from the Richard Rodgers Theatre)
Kendrick Lamar	"The Blacker the Berry" "Alright" "King Kunta" | "untitled 05 09.21.2014."
Miguel; Greg Phillinganes	Tribute to Michael Jackson "She's Out of My Life"
Adele	"All I Ask"
Justin Bieber; Diplo; Skrillex	"Love Yourself" "Where Are Ü Now"
Lady Gaga; Nile Rodgers	Tribute to David Bowie "Space Oddity" "Changes" "Ziggy Stardust" "Suffragette City" "Rebel Rebel" "Fashion" "Fame" "Under Pressure" "Let's Dance" "Heroes"
Chris Stapleton; Gary Clark Jr. Bonnie Raitt	Tribute to B.B. King "The Thrill Is Gone"
Alabama Shakes	"Don't Wanna Fight"
The Hollywood Vampires	Tribute to Lemmy "As Bad as I Am" "Ace of Spades"
Joey Alexander	Piano solo
Pitbull; Sofía Vergara; Robin Thicke; Travis Barker; Joe Perry	"El Taxi" "Bad Man"

== Presenters ==
- Ice Cube and O'Shea Jackson Jr. – presented Best Rap Album
- Anquan Boldin and Von Miller – introduced Sam Hunt and Carrie Underwood
- Ariana Grande – introduced the Weeknd
- Selena Gomez – introduced Andra Day and Ellie Goulding
- Cam and Gary Sinise – presented Best Country Album
- James Corden and LL Cool J – introduced Luke Bryan, John Legend, Demi Lovato, Meghan Trainor, and Tyrese
- Ryan Seacrest – introduced Little Big Town
- Pentatonix and Stevie Wonder – presented Song of the Year
- Anna Kendrick – introduced James Bay and Tori Kelly
- Stephen Colbert – introduced Hamilton and presented Best Musical Theater Album award to the cast
- Don Cheadle – introduced Kendrick Lamar
- Seth MacFarlane – presented Best Musical Theater Album
- Miguel – presented Best Rock Performance
- Bruno Mars – introduced Adele
- Kaley Cuoco – introduced Justin Bieber, Diplo, and Skrillex
- Sam Smith presented Best New Artist
- Ed Sheeran – introduced Lady Gaga
- Bonnie Raitt – introduced Gary Clark, Jr. and Chris Stapleton
- LL Cool J – introduced Alabama Shakes
- Dave Grohl – introduced Hollywood Vampires
- Common and Neil Portnow – introduced Joey Alexander and In Memoriam and spoke about music streaming and various NARAS initiatives
- Earth, Wind & Fire – presented Album of the Year
- Beyoncé – presented Record of the Year

== Nominees and winners ==
Note: Winners are listed in bold.

=== General ===
Record of the Year

- "**Uptown Funk**" – **Mark Ronson featuring Bruno Mars**
  - Jeff Bhasker, Philip Lawrence, Bruno Mars & Mark Ronson, producers; Josh Blair, Riccardo Damian, Serban Ghenea, Wayne Gordon, John Hanes, Inaam Haq, Boo Mitchell, Charles Moniz & Mark Ronson, engineers/mixers; Tom Coyne, mastering engineer
- "Really Love" – D'Angelo and the Vanguard
  - D'Angelo & Brent Fischer, producers; Russell Elevado, Ben Kane & Rafa Sardina, engineers/mixers; Dave Collins, mastering engineer
- "Thinking Out Loud" – Ed Sheeran
  - Jake Gosling, producer; Jake Gosling, Mark 'Spike' Stent & Geoff Swan, engineers/mixers; Stuart Hawkes, mastering engineer
- "Blank Space" – Taylor Swift
  - Max Martin & Shellback, producers; Serban Ghenea, John Hanes, Sam Holland & Michael Ilbert, engineers/mixers; Tom Coyne, mastering engineer
- "Can't Feel My Face" – The Weeknd
  - Max Martin & Ali Payami, producers; Serban Ghenea, John Hanes & Sam Holland, engineers/mixers; Tom Coyne, mastering engineer

Album of the Year

- **1989** – **Taylor Swift**
  - Jack Antonoff, Nathan Chapman, Imogen Heap, Max Martin, Mattman & Robin, Ali Payami, Shellback, Taylor Swift, Ryan Tedder & Noel Zancanella, producers; Jack Antonoff, Mattias Bylund, Smith Carlson, Nathan Chapman, Serban Ghenea, John Hanes, Imogen Heap, Sam Holland, Michael Ilbert, Brendan Morawski, Laura Sisk & Ryan Tedder, engineers/mixers; Tom Coyne, mastering engineer
- Sound & Color – Alabama Shakes
  - Alabama Shakes & Blake Mills, producers; Shawn Everett, engineer/mixer; Bob Ludwig, mastering engineer
- To Pimp a Butterfly – Kendrick Lamar
  - Bilal, George Clinton, James Fauntleroy, Ronald Isley, Rapsody, Snoop Dogg, Thundercat & Anna Wise, featured artists; Taz Arnold, Boi-1Da, Ronald Colson, Larrance Dopson, Flying Lotus, Fredrik "Tommy Black" Halldin, Knxwledge, Koz, Lovedragon, Terrace Martin, Rahki, Sounwave, Tae Beast, Thundercat, Whoarei & Pharrell Williams, producers; Derek "Mixedbyali" Ali, Thomas Burns, Andrew Coleman, Hart Gunther, James "The White Black Man" Hunt, Mike Larson, 9th Wonder & Matt Schaeffer, engineers/mixers; Mike Bozzi, mastering engineer
- Traveller – Chris Stapleton
  - Dave Cobb & Chris Stapleton, producers; Vance Powell, engineer/mixer; Pete Lyman, mastering engineer
- Beauty Behind the Madness – The Weeknd
  - Lana Del Rey, Labrinth & Ed Sheeran, featured artists; DannyBoyStyles, Mike Dean, Ben Diehl, Labrinth, Mano, Max Martin, Stephan Moccio, Carlo Montagnese, Ali Payami, The Pope, Jason Quenneville, Peter Svensson, Abel Tesfaye & Kanye West, producers; Jay Paul Bicknell, Mattias Bylund, Serban Ghenea, Noah Goldstein, John Hanes, Sam Holland, Jean Marie Horvat, Carlo Montagnese, Jason Quenneville & Dave Reitzas, engineers/mixers; Tom Coyne & Dave Kutch, mastering engineers

Song of the Year

- **"Thinking Out Loud"**
  - Ed Sheeran & Amy Wadge, songwriters (Ed Sheeran)
- "Alright"
  - Kendrick Duckworth, Mark Anthony Spears & Pharrell Williams, songwriters (Kendrick Lamar)
- "Blank Space"
  - Max Martin, Shellback & Taylor Swift, songwriters (Taylor Swift)
- "Girl Crush"
  - Hillary Lindsey, Lori McKenna & Liz Rose, songwriters (Little Big Town)
- "See You Again"
  - Andrew Cedar, Justin Franks, Charlie Puth & Cameron Thomaz, songwriters (Wiz Khalifa featuring Charlie Puth)

Best New Artist

- **Meghan Trainor**
- Courtney Barnett
- James Bay
- Sam Hunt
- Tori Kelly

=== Pop ===
Best Pop Solo Performance

- "**Thinking Out Loud**" – **Ed Sheeran**
- "Heartbeat Song" – Kelly Clarkson
- "Love Me Like You Do" – Ellie Goulding
- "Blank Space" – Taylor Swift
- "Can't Feel My Face" – The Weeknd

Best Pop Duo/Group Performance

- "**Uptown Funk**" – **Mark Ronson featuring Bruno Mars**
- "Ship to Wreck" – Florence + The Machine
- "Sugar" – Maroon 5
- "Bad Blood" – Taylor Swift featuring Kendrick Lamar
- "See You Again" – Wiz Khalifa featuring Charlie Puth

Best Traditional Pop Vocal Album

- **The Silver Lining: The Songs of Jerome Kern** **– Tony Bennett & Bill Charlap**
- Shadows in the Night – Bob Dylan
- Stages – Josh Groban
- No One Ever Tells You – Seth MacFarlane
- My Dream Duets – Barry Manilow (& Various Artists)

Best Pop Vocal Album

- **1989** **– Taylor Swift**
- Piece by Piece – Kelly Clarkson
- How Big, How Blue, How Beautiful – Florence and the Machine
- Before This World – James Taylor
- Uptown Special – Mark Ronson

=== Dance/Electronic ===
Best Dance Recording

- "**Where Are Ü Now**" – Skrillex and Diplo with Justin Bieber
  - Sonny Moore & Thomas Pentz, producers; Sonny Moore & Thomas Pentz, mixers
- "We're All We Need" – Above & Beyond featuring Zoë Johnston
  - Andrew Bayer, Jono Grant, Tony McGuinness & Paavo Siljamäki, producers; Jono Grant, Tony McGuinness & Paavo Siljamäki, mixers
- "Go" – The Chemical Brothers featuring Q-Tip
  - Tom Rowlands & Ed Simons, producers; Steve Dub Jones & Tom Rowlands, mixers
- "Never Catch Me" – Flying Lotus featuring Kendrick Lamar
  - Steven Ellison, producer; Kevin Marques Moo, mixer
- "Runaway (U & I)" – Galantis
  - Linus Eklöw, Christian Karlsson & Svidden, producers; Linus Eklöw, Niklas Flyckt & Christian Karlsson, mixers

Best Dance/Electronic Album

- **Skrillex and Diplo Present Jack Ü** – Skrillex and Diplo
- Our Love – Caribou
- Born in the Echoes – The Chemical Brothers
- Caracal – Disclosure
- In Colour – Jamie xx

=== Contemporary Instrumental ===
Best Contemporary Instrumental Album

- **Sylva** – Snarky Puppy & Metropole Orkest
- Guitar in the Space Age! – Bill Frisell
- Love Language – Wouter Kellerman
- Afrodeezia – Marcus Miller
- The Gospel According to Jazz, Chapter IV – Kirk Whalum

=== Rock ===
Best Rock Performance

- "**Don't Wanna Fight**" – Alabama Shakes
- "What Kind of Man" – Florence + The Machine
- "Something from Nothing" – Foo Fighters
- "Ex's & Oh's" – Elle King
- "Moaning Lisa Smile" – Wolf Alice

Best Metal Performance

- "**Cirice**" – Ghost
- "Identity" – August Burns Red
- "512" – Lamb of God
- "Thank You" – Sevendust
- "Custer" – Slipknot

Best Rock Song

- **"Don't Wanna Fight"**
  - Alabama Shakes, songwriters (Alabama Shakes)
- "Ex's & Oh's"
  - Dave Bassett & Elle King, songwriters (Elle King)
- "Hold Back the River"
  - Iain Archer & James Bay, songwriters (James Bay)
- "Lydia"
  - Richard Meyer, Ryan Meyer & Johnny Stevens, songwriters (Highly Suspect)
- "What Kind of Man"
  - John Hill, Tom Hull & Florence Welch, songwriters (Florence + The Machine)

Best Rock Album

- **Drones** – Muse
- Chaos and the Calm – James Bay
- Kintsugi – Death Cab for Cutie
- Mister Asylum – Highly Suspect
- .5: The Gray Chapter – Slipknot

=== Alternative ===
Best Alternative Music Album

- **Sound & Color** – Alabama Shakes
- Vulnicura – Björk
- The Waterfall – My Morning Jacket
- Currents – Tame Impala
- Star Wars – Wilco

=== R&B ===
Best R&B Performance

- "**Earned It (Fifty Shades of Grey)**" – The Weeknd
- "If I Don't Have You" – Tamar Braxton
- "Rise Up" – Andra Day
- "Breathing Underwater" – Hiatus Kaiyote
- "Planez" – Jeremih featuring J. Cole

Best Traditional R&B Performance

- "**Little Ghetto Boy**" – Lalah Hathaway
- "He Is" – Faith Evans
- "Let It Burn" – Jazmine Sullivan
- "Shame" – Tyrese
- "My Favorite Part of You" – Charlie Wilson

Best R&B Song

- **"Really Love"**
  - D'Angelo, Gina Figueroa & Kendra Foster, songwriters (D'Angelo and The Vanguard)
- "Coffee"
  - Brook Davis & Miguel Pimentel, songwriters (Miguel)
- "Earned It (Fifty Shades of Grey)"
  - Ahmad Balshe, Stephan Moccio, Jason Quenneville & Abel Tesfaye, songwriters (The Weeknd)
- "Let It Burn"
  - Kenny B. Edmonds, Jazmine Sullivan & Dwane M. Weir II, songwriters (Jazmine Sullivan)
- "Shame"
  - Warryn Campbell, Tyrese Gibson & D.J. Rogers Jr, songwriters (Tyrese)

Best Urban Contemporary Album

- **Beauty Behind the Madness** – The Weeknd
- Ego Death – The Internet
- You Should Be Here – Kehlani
- Blood – Lianne La Havas
- Wildheart – Miguel

Best R&B Album

- **Black Messiah** – D'Angelo and The Vanguard
- Coming Home – Leon Bridges
- Cheers to the Fall – Andra Day
- Reality Show – Jazmine Sullivan
- Forever Charlie – Charlie Wilson

=== Rap ===
Best Rap Performance

- "**Alright**" – Kendrick Lamar
- "Apparently" – J. Cole
- "Back to Back" – Drake
- "Trap Queen" – Fetty Wap
- "Truffle Butter" – Nicki Minaj featuring Drake & Lil Wayne
- "All Day" – Kanye West featuring Theophilus London, Allan Kingdom & Paul McCartney

Best Rap/Sung Collaboration

- "**These Walls**" – Kendrick Lamar featuring Bilal, Anna Wise & Thundercat
- "One Man Can Change The World" – Big Sean featuring Kanye West & John Legend
- "Glory" – Common & John Legend
- "Classic Man" – Jidenna featuring Roman GianArthur
- "Only" – Nicki Minaj featuring Drake, Lil Wayne & Chris Brown

Best Rap Song

- **"Alright"**
  - Kendrick Duckworth, Kawan Prather, Mark Anthony Spears & Pharrell Williams, songwriters (Kendrick Lamar)
- "All Day"
  - Ernest Brown, Tyler Bryant, Sean Combs, Mike Dean, Rennard East, Noah Goldstein, Malik Yusef Jones, Karim Kharbouch, Allan Kyariga, Kendrick Lamar, Paul McCartney, Victor Mensah, Charles Njapa, Che Pope, Patrick Reynolds, Allen Ritter, Kanye West, Mario Winans & Cydel Young, songwriters (Kanye West featuring Theophilus London, Allan Kingdom & Paul McCartney)
- "Energy"
  - Richard Dorfmeister, A. Graham, Markus Kienzl, M. O'Brien, M. Samuels & Phillip Thomas, songwriters (Drake)
- "Glory"
  - Lonnie Lynn, Che Smith & John Stephens, songwriters (Common & John Legend)
- "Trap Queen"
  - Tony Fadd & Willie J. Maxwell, songwriters (Fetty Wap)

Best Rap Album

- **To Pimp a Butterfly** – Kendrick Lamar
- 2014 Forest Hills Drive – J. Cole
- Compton – Dr. Dre
- If You're Reading This It's Too Late – Drake
- The Pinkprint – Nicki Minaj

=== Country ===
Best Country Solo Performance

- "**Traveller**" – Chris Stapleton
- "Burning House" – Cam
- "Little Toy Guns" – Carrie Underwood
- "John Cougar, John Deere, John 3:16" – Keith Urban
- "Chances Are" – Lee Ann Womack

Best Country Duo/Group Performance

- "**Girl Crush**" – Little Big Town
- "Stay a Little Longer" – Brothers Osborne
- "If I Needed You" – Joey + Rory
- "The Driver" – Charles Kelley featuring Dierks Bentley & Eric Paslay
- "Lonely Tonight" – Blake Shelton featuring Ashley Monroe

Best Country Song

- "**Girl Crush**"
  - Hillary Lindsey, Lori McKenna & Liz Rose, songwriters (Little Big Town)
- "Chances Are"
  - Hayes Carll, songwriters (Lee Ann Womack)
- "Diamond Rings and Old Barstools"
  - Barry Dean, Luke Laird & Jonathan Singleton, songwriters (Tim McGraw)
- "Hold My Hand"
  - Brandy Clark & Mark Stephen Jones, songwriters (Brandy Clark)
- "Traveller"
  - Chris Stapleton, songwriter (Chris Stapleton)

Best Country Album

- **Traveller** – Chris Stapleton
- Montevallo – Sam Hunt
- Pain Killer – Little Big Town
- The Blade – Ashley Monroe
- Pageant Material – Kacey Musgraves

=== New Age ===
Best New Age Album

- **Grace** – Paul Avgerinos
- Bhakti without Borders – Madi Das
- Voyager – Catherine Duc
- Love – Peter Kater
- Asia Beauty – Ron Korb

=== Jazz ===
Best Improvised Jazz Solo

- "**Cherokee**" – Christian McBride, soloist
- "Giant Steps" – Joey Alexander, soloist
- "Arbiters of Evolution" – Donny McCaslin, soloist
- "Friend or Foe" – Joshua Redman, soloist
- "Past Present" – John Scofield, soloist

Best Jazz Vocal Album

- **For One to Love** – Cécile McLorin Salvant
- Many a New Day: Karrin Allyson Sings Rodgers & Hammerstein – Karrin Allyson
- Find a Heart – Denise Donatelli
- Flirting with Disaster – Lorraine Feather
- Jamison – Jamison Ross

Best Jazz Instrumental Album

- **Past Present** – John Scofield
- My Favorite Things – Joey Alexander
- Breathless – Terence Blanchard featuring The E-Collective
- Covered: Recorded Live at Capitol Studios – Robert Glasper & The Robert Glasper Trio
- Beautiful Life – Jimmy Greene

Best Large Jazz Ensemble Album

- **The Thompson Fields** – Maria Schneider Orchestra
- Lines of Color – Gil Evans Project
- Köln – Marshall Gilkes and WDR Big Band
- Cuba: The Conversation Continues – Arturo O'Farrill and the Afro Latin Jazz Orchestra
- Home Suite Home – Patrick Williams

Best Latin Jazz Album

- **Made in Brazil** – Eliane Elias
- Impromptu – The Rodriguez Brothers
- Suite Caminos – Gonzalo Rubalcaba
- Intercambio – Wayne Wallace Latin Jazz Quintet
- Identities are Changeable – Miguel Zenón

=== Gospel/Contemporary Christian Music ===
Best Gospel Performance/Song

- "**Wanna Be Happy?**" – Kirk Franklin
  - Kirk Franklin, songwriter
- "Worth [Live]" – Anthony Brown & Group Therapy
  - Anthony Brown, songwriter
- "Intentional" – Travis Greene
  - Travis Greene, songwriter
- "How Awesome Is Our God [Live]" – Israel & Newbreed featuring Yolanda Adams
  - Neville Diedericks, Israel Houghton & Meleasa Houghton, songwriters
- "Worth Fighting For [Live]" – Brian Courtney Wilson
  - Aaron Lindsey & Brian Courtney Wilson, songwriters

Best Contemporary Christian Music Performance/Song

- "**Holy Spirit**" – Francesca Battistelli
  - Bryan Torwalt & Katie Torwalt, songwriters
- "Lift Your Head Weary Sinner (Chains)" – Crowder
  - Ed Cash, David Crowder & Seth Philpott, songwriters
- "Because He Lives (Amen)" – Matt Maher
  - Daniel Carson, Ed Cash, Jason Ingram, Matt Maher & Chris Tomlin, songwriters
- "Soul on Fire" – Third Day featuring All Sons & Daughters
  - Tai Anderson, Brenton Brown, David Carr, Mark Lee, Matt Maher & Mac Powell, songwriters
- "Feel It" – TobyMac featuring Mr. Talkbox
  - Cary Barlowe, David Arthur Garcia & Toby McKeehan, songwriters

Best Gospel Album

- **Covered: Alive in Asia [Live]** (Deluxe) – Israel & Newbreed
- Destined to Win [Live] – Karen Clark Sheard
- Living It – Dorinda Clark-Cole
- One Place Live – Tasha Cobbs
- Life Music: Stage Two – Jonathan McReynolds

Best Contemporary Christian Music Album

- **This Is Not a Test** – TobyMac
- Whatever the Road – Jason Crabb
- How Can It Be – Lauren Daigle
- Saints and Sinners – Matt Maher
- Love Ran Red – Chris Tomlin

Best Roots Gospel Album

- **Still Rockin' My Soul** – The Fairfield Four
- Pray Now – Karen Peck and New River
- Directions Home (Songs We Love, Songs You Know) – Point of Grace

=== Latin ===
Best Latin Pop Album

- **A Quien Quiera Escuchar (Deluxe Edition)** – Ricky Martin
- Terral – Pablo Alborán
- Healer – Alex Cuba
- Sirope – Alejandro Sanz
- Algo Sucede – Julieta Venegas

Best Latin Rock Urban or Alternative Album

- **Dale** – Pitbull
- **Hasta la Raíz** – Natalia Lafourcade
- Amanecer – Bomba Estéreo
- Mondongo – La Cuneta Son Machín
- Caja de Música – Monsieur Periné

Best Regional Mexican Music Album (Including Tejano)

- **Realidades – Deluxe Edition** – Los Tigres del Norte
- Mi Vicio Más Grande – Banda El Recodo De Don Cruz Lizárraga
- Ya Dime Adiós – La Maquinaria Norteña
- Zapateando – Los Cojolites
- Tradición, Arte y Pasión – Mariachi Los Camperos De Nati Cano

Best Tropical Latin Album

- **Son de Panamá** – Rubén Blades with Roberto Delgado & Orquesta
- Tributo a Los Compadres: No Quiero Llanto – José Alberto "El Canario" & Septeto Santiaguero
- Presente Continuo – Guaco
- Todo Tiene Su Hora – Juan Luis Guerra 4.40
- Que Suenen los Tambores – Victor Manuelle

=== American Roots ===
Best American Roots Performance

- "**See That My Grave Is Kept Clean**" – Mavis Staples
- "And Am I Born to Die" – Béla Fleck & Abigail Washburn
- "Born to Play Guitar" – Buddy Guy
- "City of Our Lady" – The Milk Carton Kids
- "Julep" – Punch Brothers

Best American Roots Song

- **"24 Frames"**
  - Jason Isbell, songwriter (Jason Isbell)
- "All Night Long"
  - Raul Malo, songwriter (The Mavericks)
- "The Cost of Living"
  - Don Henley & Stan Lynch, songwriters (Don Henley & Merle Haggard)
- "Julep"
  - Chris Eldridge, Paul Kowert, Noam Pikelny, Chris Thile & Gabe Witcher, songwriters (Punch Brothers)
- "The Traveling Kind"
  - Cory Chisel, Rodney Crowell & Emmylou Harris, songwriters (Emmylou Harris & Rodney Crowell)

Best Americana Album

- **Something More Than Free** – Jason Isbell
- The Firewatcher's Daughter – Brandi Carlile
- The Traveling Kind – Emmylou Harris & Rodney Crowell
- Mono – The Mavericks
- The Phosphorescent Blues – Punch Brothers

Best Bluegrass Album

- **The Muscle Shoals Recordings** – The SteelDrivers
- Pocket Full of Keys – Dale Ann Bradley
- Before the Sun Goes Down – Rob Ickes and Trey Hensley
- In Session – Doyle Lawson & Quicksilver
- Man of Constant Sorrow – Ralph Stanley and friends

Best Blues Album

- **Born to Play Guitar** – Buddy Guy
- Descendants of Hill Country – Cedric Burnside Project
- Outskirts of Love – Shemekia Copeland
- Worthy – Bettye LaVette
- Muddy Waters 100 – John Primer and various artists

Best Folk Album

- **Béla Fleck & Abigail Washburn** – Béla Fleck and Abigail Washburn
- Wood, Wire & Words – Norman Blake
- Tomorrow Is My Turn – Rhiannon Giddens
- Servant of Love – Patty Griffin
- Didn't He Ramble – Glen Hansard

Best Regional Music Album

- **Go Go Juice** – Jon Cleary
- La La La La – Natalie Ai Kamauu
- Kawaiokalena – Kealiʻi Reichel
- Get Ready – The Revelers
- Generations – Windwalker and the MCW

=== Reggae ===
Best Reggae Album

- **Strictly Roots** – Morgan Heritage
- Branches of the Same Tree – Rocky Dawuni
- The Cure – Jah Cure
- Acousticalevy – Barrington Levy
- Zion Awake – Luciano

=== World Music ===
Best World Music Album

- **Sings** – Angélique Kidjo
- Gilbertos Samba Ao Vivo – Gilberto Gil
- Music from Inala – Ladysmith Black Mambazo with Ella Spira and The Inala Ensemble
- Home – Anoushka Shankar
- I Have No Everything Here – Zomba Prison Project

=== Children's ===
Best Children's Album

- **Home** – Tim Kubart
- ¡Come Bien! Eat Right! – José-Luis Orozco
- Dark Pie Concerns – Gustafer Yellowgold
- How Great Can This Day Be – Lori Henriques
- Trees – Molly Ledford & Billy Kelly

=== Spoken Word ===
Best Spoken Word Album (Includes Poetry, Audio Books and Storytelling)

- **A Full Life: Reflections at Ninety** – Jimmy Carter
- Blood on Snow (Jo Nesbø) – Patti Smith
- Brief Encounters: Conversations, Magic Moments, and Assorted Hijinks – Dick Cavett
- Patience and Sarah (Isabel Miller) – Janis Ian & Jean Smart
- Yes Please – Amy Poehler (& Various Artists)

=== Comedy ===
Best Comedy Album

- **Live at Madison Square Garden** – Louis C.K.
- Back to the Drawing Board – Lisa Lampanelli
- Brooklyn – Wyatt Cenac
- Happy. And a Lot. – Jay Mohr
- Just Being Honest – Craig Ferguson

=== Musical Theatre ===
Best Musical Theater Album

- **Hamilton** – Daveed Diggs, Renée Elise Goldsberry, Jonathan Groff, Christopher Jackson, Jasmine Cephas Jones, Lin-Manuel Miranda, Leslie Odom, Jr., Okieriete Onaodowan, Anthony Ramos & Phillipa Soo, principal soloists; Alex Lacamoire, Lin-Manuel Miranda, Bill Sherman, Ahmir Thompson & Tariq Trotter, producers; Lin-Manuel Miranda, composer & lyricist (Original Broadway Cast)
- An American In Paris – Leanne Cope, Max Von Essen, Robert Fairchild, Jill Paice & Brandon Uranowitz, principal soloists; Rob Fisher & Scott Lehrer, producers (George Gershwin, composer; Ira Gershwin, lyricist) (Original Broadway Cast)
- Fun Home – Michael Cerveris, Judy Kuhn, Sydney Lucas, Beth Malone & Emily Skeggs, principal soloists; Philip Chaffin & Tommy Krasker, producers (Jeanine Tesori, composer; Lisa Kron, lyricist) (Original Broadway Cast)
- The King and I – Ruthie Ann Miles, Kelli O'Hara, Ashley Park, Conrad Ricamora & Ken Watanabe, principal soloists; David Caddick, David Lai & Ted Sperling, producers (Richard Rodgers, composer; Oscar Hammerstein II, lyricist) (2015 Broadway Cast)
- Something Rotten! – Heidi Blickenstaff, Christian Borle, John Cariani, Brian d'Arcy James, Brad Oscar & Kate Reinders, principal soloists; Kurt Deutsch, Karey Kirkpatrick, Wayne Kirkpatrick, Lawrence Manchester, Kevin McCollum & Phil Reno, producers; Karey Kirkpatrick & Wayne Kirkpatrick, composers/lyricists (Original Broadway Cast)

=== Music for Visual Media ===
Best Compilation Soundtrack for Visual Media

- **Glen Campbell: I'll Be Me** – various artists
  - Julian Raymond, compilation producer
- Empire: Season 1 – various artists (Jussie Smollett, Yazz, Jennifer Hudson etc.)
  - Timbaland & Jim Beanz, compilation producers
- Fifty Shades of Grey – various artists
  - Mike Knobloch & Dana Sano, compilation producers
- Pitch Perfect 2 – various artists (Anna Kendrick, Rebel Wilson, Hailee Steinfeld, Brittany Snow, Anna Camp, Alexis Knapp, Hana Mae Lee, Ester Dean, Chrissie Fit, Kelley Jakle, Shelley Regner etc.)
  - Julianne Jordan, Harvey Mason Jr. & Julia Michels, compilation producers
- Selma – various artists
  - Ava DuVernay, compilation producer

Best Score Soundtrack for Visual Media

- **Birdman – Antonio Sánchez, composer**
- The Imitation Game – Alexandre Desplat, composer
- Interstellar – Hans Zimmer, composer
- The Theory of Everything – Jóhann Jóhannsson, composer
- Whiplash – Justin Hurwitz, composer

Best Song Written for Visual Media

- "**Glory**" (from Selma) – Lonnie Lynn, Che Smith & John Stephens, songwriters (Common & John Legend)
- "Earned It" (from Fifty Shades of Grey) – Ahmad Balshe, Jason Quenneville, Stephan Moccio & Abel Tesfaye, songwriters (The Weeknd)
- "Love Me like You Do" (from Fifty Shades of Grey) – Savan Kotecha, Max Martin, Tove Nilsson, Ali Payami, & Ilya Salmanzadeh, songwriters (Ellie Goulding)
- "See You Again" (from Furious 7) – Andrew Cedar, Justin Franks, Charles Puth & Cameron Thomaz, songwriters (Wiz Khalifa featuring Charlie Puth)
- "Til It Happens to You" (from The Hunting Ground) – Lady Gaga & Diane Warren, songwriters (Lady Gaga)

=== Composing ===
Best Instrumental Composition

- **"The Afro Latin Jazz Suite"**
  - Arturo O'Farrill, composer (Arturo O'Farrill & The Afro Latin Jazz Orchestra featuring Rudresh Mahanthappa)
- "Civil War"
  - Bob Mintzer, composer (Bob Mintzer Big Band)
- "Confetti Man"
  - David Balakrishnan, composer (Turtle Island Quartet)
- "Neil"
  - Rich DeRosa, composer (University of North Texas College of Music, One O'Clock Lab Band)
- "Vesper"
  - Marshall Gilkes, composer (Marshall Gilkes & WDR Big Band)

=== Arranging ===
Best Arrangement, Instrumental or A Cappella

- **"Dance of the Sugar Plum Fairy"**
  - Ben Bram, Mitch Grassi, Scott Hoying, Avi Kaplan, Kirstie Maldonado and Kevin Olusola, arrangers (Pentatonix)
- "Bruno Mars"
  - Paul Allen, Troy Hayes, Evin Martin & J Moss, arrangers (Vocally Challenged)
- "Do You Hear What I Hear?"
  - Armand Hutton, arranger (Committed)
- "Ghost of a Chance"
  - Bob James, arranger (Bob James & Nathan East)
- "You and the Night and the Music"
  - John Fedchock, arranger (John Fedchock New York Big Band)

Best Arrangement, Instruments and Vocals

- **"Sue (Or in a Season of Crime)"**
  - Maria Schneider, arranger (David Bowie)
- "Be My Muse"
  - Shelly Berg, arranger (Lorraine Feather)
- "52nd & Broadway"
  - Patrick Williams, arranger (Patrick Williams featuring Patti Austin)
- "Garota de Ipanema"
  - Otmaro Ruiz, arranger (Catina DeLuna featuring Otmaro Ruiz)
- "When I Come Home"
  - Jimmy Greene, arranger (Jimmy Greene with Javier Colon)

=== Packaging ===
Best Recording Package

- **Still the King: Celebrating the Music of Bob Wills and His Texas Playboys**
  - Sarah Dodds, Shauna Dodds & Dick Reeves, art directors (Asleep at the Wheel)
- Alagoas
  - Alex Trochut, art director (Alagoas)
- Bush
  - Anita Marisa Boriboon & Phi Hollinger, art directors (Snoop Dogg)
- How Big, How Blue, How Beautiful (Deluxe Edition)
  - Brian Roettinger, art director (Florence + The Machine)
- My Happiness
  - Nathanio Strimpopulos & Jack White, art directors (Elvis Presley)

Best Boxed or Special Limited Edition Package

- **The Rise & Fall of Paramount Records, Volume Two (1928–32)**
  - Susan Archie, Dean Blackwood & Jack White, art directors (Various Artists)
- Beneath the Skin (Deluxe Box Set)
  - Leif Podhajsky, art director (Of Monsters and Men)
- I Love You, Honeybear (Limited Edition Deluxe Vinyl)
  - Sasha Barr & Josh Tillman, art directors (Father John Misty)
- Sticky Fingers (Super Deluxe Edition)
  - Stephen Kennedy & James Tilley, art directors (The Rolling Stones)
- 30 Trips Around the Sun
  - Doran Tyson & Steve Vance, art directors (Grateful Dead)
- What a Terrible World, What a Beautiful World (Deluxe Box Set)
  - Carson Ellis, Jeri Heiden & Glen Nakasako, art directors (The Decemberists)

=== Notes ===
Best Album Notes

- **Love Has Many Faces: A Quartet, A Ballet, Waiting to Be Danced**
  - Joni Mitchell, album notes writer (Joni Mitchell)
- Folksongs of Another America: Field Recordings from the Upper Midwest, 1937–1946
  - James P. Leary, album notes writer (Various Artists)
- Lead Belly: The Smithsonian Folkways Collection
  - Jeff Place, album notes writer (Lead Belly)
- Portrait of an American Singer
  - Ted Olson, album notes writer (Tennessee Ernie Ford)
- Songs of the Night: Dance Recordings, 1916–1925
  - Ryan Barna, album notes writer (Joseph C. Smith's Orchestra)

=== Historical ===
Best Historical Album

- **The Basement Tapes Complete: The Bootleg Series Vol. 11**
  - Steve Berkowitz, Jan Haust & Jeff Rosen, compilation producers; Peter J. Moore & Mark Wilder, mastering engineers (Bob Dylan And The Band)
- The Complete Concert by the Sea
  - Geri Allen, Jocelyn Arem & Steve Rosenthal, compilation producers; Jamie Howarth & Jessica Thompson, mastering engineers (Erroll Garner)
- Native North America (Vol. 1): Aboriginal Folk, Rock, and Country 1966–1985
  - Kevin Howes, compilation producer; Greg Mindorff, mastering engineer (Various Artists)
- Parchman Farm: Photographs and Field Recordings, 1947–1959
  - Steven Lance Ledbetter & Nathan Salsburg, compilation producers; Michael Graves, mastering engineer (Various Artists)
- Songs My Mother Taught Me
  - Mark Puryear, compilation producer; Pete Reiniger, mastering engineer (Fannie Lou Hamer)

=== Engineered Album ===
Best Engineered Album, Non-Classical

- **Sound & Color**
  - Shawn Everett, engineer; Bob Ludwig, mastering engineer (Alabama Shakes)
- Before This World
  - Dave O'Donnell, engineer; Ted Jensen, mastering engineer (James Taylor)
- Currency of Man
  - Maxime Le Guil, engineer; Bernie Grundman, mastering engineer (Melody Gardot)
- Recreational Love
  - Greg Kurstin & Alex Pasco, engineers; Emily Lazar, mastering engineer (The Bird And The Bee)
- Wallflower
  - Steve Price, Jochem van der Saag & Jorge Vivo, engineers; Paul Blakemore, mastering engineer (Diana Krall)

Best Engineered Album, Classical

- **Ask Your Mama**
  - Leslie Ann Jones, John Kilgore, Nora Kroll-Rosenbaum & Justin Merrill, engineers; Patricia Sullivan, mastering engineer (George Manahan & San Francisco Ballet Orchestra)
- Dutilleux: Métaboles; L'Arbre Des Songes; Symphony No. 2, 'Le Double
  - Dmitriy Lipay, engineer; Alexander Lipay, mastering engineer (Ludovic Morlot, Augustin Hadelich & Seattle Symphony)
- Monteverdi: Il Ritorno D'Ulisse In Patria
  - Robert Friedrich, engineer; Michael Bishop, mastering engineer (Martin Pearlman, Jennifer Rivera, Fernando Guimarães & Boston Baroque)
- Rachmaninoff: All-Night Vigil
  - Byeong Joon Hwang & John Newton, engineers; Mark Donahue, mastering engineer (Charles Bruffy, Phoenix Chorale & Kansas City Chorale)
- Saint-Saëns: Symphony No. 3, 'Organ'
  - Keith O. Johnson & Sean Royce Martin, engineers; Keith O. Johnson, mastering engineer (Michael Stern & Kansas City Symphony);

=== Producer ===
Producer of the Year, Non-Classical

- **Jeff Bhasker**
  - "Ain't Gonna Drown" (Elle King)
  - "Burning Doves" (Mikky Ekko)
  - "Burning House" (Cam)
  - Grand Romantic (Nate Ruess)
  - "Last Damn Night" (Elle King)
  - "Never Let You Down" (Woodkid featuring Lykke Li)
  - "Runaway Train" (Cam)
  - Uptown Special (Mark Ronson)
- Dave Cobb
  - Delilah (Anderson East)
  - Little Neon Limelight (Houndmouth)
  - "Smoke" (A Thousand Horses)
  - Something More Than Free (Jason Isbell)
  - Southernality (A Thousand Horses)
  - 3 (honeyhoney)
  - Traveller (Chris Stapleton)
- Diplo
  - "Bitch I'm Madonna" (Madonna featuring Nicki Minaj) (S)
  - "Doctor Pepper" (Diplo featuring CL, Riff Raff & OG Maco) (S)
  - "Golden" (Travie McCoy featuring Sia) (S)
  - "Lean On" (Major Lazer featuring MØ & DJ Snake) (S)
  - "Where Are Ü Now" (Skrillex And Diplo With Justin Bieber) (S)
  - Skrillex and Diplo Present Jack Ü (Skrillex and Diplo) (A)
  - Peace Is the Mission (Major Lazer) (A)
- Larry Klein
  - Currency of Man (Melody Gardot)
  - Freedom & Surrender (Lizz Wright)
  - Heartland (Indra Rios-Moore)
  - I'm Leaving You (Florence K)
  - Parker's Place (Parker Bent)
  - Speaking in Tongues (Luciana Souza)
  - Tenderness (JD Souther)
- Blake Mills
  - Sound & Color (Alabama Shakes)

Producer of the Year, Classical

- **Judith Sherman**
  - Ask Your Mama (George Manahan & San Francisco Ballet Orchestra)
  - Fields: Double Cluster; Space Sciences (Jan Kučera, Gloria Chuang & Moravian Philharmonic Orchestra)
  - Liaisons – Re-Imagining Sondheim from the Piano (Anthony de Mare)
  - Montage – Great Film Composers & the Piano (Gloria Cheng)
  - Multitude, Solitude (Momenta Quartet)
  - Of Color Braided All Desire – Music of Eric Moe (Christine Brandes, Brentano String Quartet, Dominic Donato, Jessica Meyer, Karen Ouzounian, Manhattan String Quartet & Talujon)
  - Rzewski: The People United Will Never Be Defeated! (Ursula Oppens)
  - Sirota: Parting the Veil – Works for Violin & Piano (David Friend, Hyeyung Julie Yoon, Laurie Carney & Soyeon Kate Lee)
  - Turina: Chamber Music for Strings & Piano (Lincoln Trio)
- Blanton Alspaugh
  - Hill: Symphony No. 4; Concertino Nos. 1 & 2; Divertimento (Peter Bay, Anton Nel & Austin Symphony Orchestra)
  - Rachmaninoff: All-Night Vigil (Charles Bruffy, Phoenix Chorale & Kansas City Chorale)
  - Sacred Songs of Life & Love (Brian A. Schmidt & South Dakota Chorale)
  - Spirit of the American Range (Carlos Kalmar & The Oregon Symphony)
  - Tower: Violin Concerto; Stroke; Chamber Dance (Giancarlo Guerrero, Cho-Liang Lin & Nashville Symphony)
- Manfred Eicher
  - Franz Schubert (András Schiff)
  - Galina Ustvolskaya (Patricia Kopatchinskaja, Markus Hinterhäuser & Reto Bieri)
  - Moore: Dances & Canons (Saskia Lankhoorn)
  - Rihm: Et Lux (Paul Van Nevel, Minguet Quartet & Huelgas Ensemble)
  - Visions Fugitives (Anna Gourari)
- Marina A. Ledin, Victor Ledin
  - Dances for Piano & Orchestra (Joel Fan, Christophe Chagnard & Northwest Sinfonietta)
  - Tempo do Brasil (Marc Regnier)
  - Woman at the New Piano (Nadia Shpachenko)
- Dan Merceruio
  - Chapí: String Quartets 1 & 2 (Cuarteto Latinoamericano)
  - From Whence We Came (Ensemble Galilei)
  - Gregson: Touch (Peter Gregson)
  - In the Light of Air – ICE Performs Anna Thorvaldsdottir (International Contemporary Ensemble)
  - Schumann (Ying Quartet)
  - Scrapyard Exotica (Del Sol String Quartet)
  - Stravinsky: Petrushka (Richard Scerbo & Inscape Chamber Orchestra)
  - What Artemisia Heard (El Mundo)
  - ZOFO Plays Terry Riley (ZOFO)

=== Remixer ===
Best Remixed Recording, Non-Classical

- **"Uptown Funk" (Dave Audé Remix)**
  - Dave Audé, remixer (Mark Ronson featuring Bruno Mars)
- "Berlin by Overnight" (CFCF Remix)
  - CFCF, remixer (Daniel Hope)
- "Hold On" (Fatum Remix)
  - Bill Hamel & Chad Newbold, remixers (JES with Shant & Clint Maximus)
- "Runaway (U & I)" (Kaskade Remix)
  - Ryan Raddon, remixer (Galantis)
- "Say My Name" (RAC Remix)
  - André Allen Anjos, remixer (Odesza featuring Zyra)

=== Surround Sound ===
Best Surround Sound Album

- **Amused to Death**
  - James Guthrie, surround mix engineer; James Guthrie & Joel Plante, surround mastering engineers; James Guthrie, surround producer (Roger Waters)
- Amdahl: Astrognosia & Aesop
  - Morten Lindberg, surround mix engineer; Morten Lindberg, surround mastering engineer; Morten Lindberg, surround producer (Ingar Heine Bergby & Norwegian Radio Orchestra)
- Magnificat
  - Morten Lindberg, surround mix engineer; Morten Lindberg, surround mastering engineer; Morten Lindberg, surround producer (Øyvind Gimse, Anita Brevik, Nidarosdomens Jentekor & TrondheimSolistene)
- Shostakovich: Symphony No. 7
  - Erdo Groot, surround mix engineer; Erdo Groot, surround mastering engineer; Philip Traugott, surround producer (Paavo Järvi & Russian National Orchestra)
- Spes
  - Morten Lindberg, surround mix engineer; Morten Lindberg, surround mastering engineer; Morten Lindberg, surround producer (Tove Ramlo-Ystad & Cantus)

=== Classical ===
Performers who are not eligible for an award (such as orchestras, choirs, or soloists) are mentioned in parentheses

Best Orchestral Performance

- **Shostakovich: Under Stalin's Shadow – Symphony No. 10**
  - Andris Nelsons, conductor (Boston Symphony Orchestra)
- Bruckner: Symphony No. 4
  - Manfred Honeck, conductor (Pittsburgh Symphony Orchestra)
- Dutilleux: Métaboles; L'Arbre Des Songes; Symphony No. 2, 'Le Double'
  - Ludovic Morlot, conductor (Seattle Symphony)
- Spirit of the American Range
  - Carlos Kalmar, conductor (Oregon Symphony)
- Zhou Long & Chen Yi: Symphony 'Humen 1839'
  - Darrell Ang, conductor (New Zealand Symphony Orchestra)

Best Opera Recording

- **Ravel: L'Enfant Et Les Sortilèges; Shéhérazade**
  - Seiji Ozawa, conductor; Isabel Leonard; Dominic Fyfe, producer (Saito Kinen Orchestra; SKF Matsumoto Chorus & SKF Matsumoto Children's Chorus)
- Janáček: Jenůfa
  - Donald Runnicles, conductor; Will Hartmann, Michaela Kaune & Jennifer Larmore; Magdalena Herbst, producer (Orchestra of the Deutsche Oper Berlin; Chorus of the Deutsche Oper Berlin)
- Monteverdi: Il Ritorno D'Ulisse In Patria
  - Martin Pearlman, conductor; Fernando Guimarães & Jennifer Rivera; Thomas C. Moore, producer (Boston Baroque)
- Mozart: Die Entführung Aus Dem Serail
  - Yannick Nézet-Séguin, conductor; Diana Damrau, Paul Schweinester & Rolando Villazón; Sid McLauchlan, producer (Chamber Orchestra of Europe)
- Steffani: Niobe, Regina Di Tebe
  - Paul O'Dette & Stephen Stubbs, conductors; Karina Gauvin & Philippe Jaroussky; Renate Wolter-Seevers, producer (Boston Early Music Festival Orchestra)

Best Choral Performance

- **Rachmaninoff: All-Night Vigil**
  - Charles Bruffy, conductor (Paul Davidson, Frank Fleschner, Toby Vaughn Kidd, Bryan Pinkall, Julia Scozzafava, Bryan Taylor & Joseph Warner; Phoenix Chorale & Kansas City Chorale)
- Beethoven: Missa Solemnis
  - Bernard Haitink, conductor; Peter Dijkstra, chorus master (Anton Barachovsky, Genia Kühmeier, Elisabeth Kulman, Hanno Müller-Brachmann & Mark Padmore; Symphonieorchester des Bayerischen Rundfunks; Chor des Bayerischen Rundfunks)
- Monteverdi: Vespers Of 1610
  - Harry Christophers, conductor (Jeremy Budd, Grace Davidson, Ben Davies, Mark Dobell, Eamonn Dougan & Charlotte Mobbs; The Sixteen)
- Pablo Neruda – The Poet Sings
  - Craig Hella Johnson, conductor (James K. Bass, Laura Mercado-Wright, Eric Neuville & Lauren Snouffer; Faith DeBow & Stephen Redfield; Conspirare)
- Paulus: Far in the Heavens
  - Eric Holtan, conductor (Sara Fraker, Matthew Goinz, Thea Lobo, Owen McIntosh, Kathryn Mueller & Christine Vivona; True Concord Orchestra; True Concord Voices)

Best Chamber Music/Small Ensemble Performance

- **Filament**
  - Eighth Blackbird
- Brahms: The Piano Trios
  - Tanja Tetzlaff, Christian Tetzlaff & Lars Vogt
- Flaherty: Airdancing for Toy Piano, Piano & Electronics
  - Nadia Shpachenko & Genevieve Feiwen Lee
- Render
  - Brad Wells & Roomful of Teeth
- Shostakovich: Piano Quintet & String Quartet No. 2
  - Takács Quartet & Marc-André Hamelin

Best Classical Instrumental Solo

- **Dutilleux: Violin Concerto, L'Arbre Des Songes**
  - Augustin Hadelich; Ludovic Morlot, conductor (Seattle Symphony)
- Grieg & Moszkowski: Piano Concertos
  - Joseph Moog; Nicholas Milton, conductor (Deutsche Radio Philharmonie Saarbrücken Kaiserslautern)
- Mozart: Keyboard Music, Vol. 7
  - Kristian Bezuidenhout
- Rachmaninov Variations
  - Daniil Trifonov (Philadelphia Orchestra)
- Rzewski: The People United Will Never Be Defeated!
  - Ursula Oppens (Jerome Lowenthal)

Best Classical Solo Vocal Album

- **Joyce & Tony – Live from Wigmore Hall**
  - Joyce DiDonato; Antonio Pappano, accompanist
- Beethoven: An Die Ferne Geliebte; Haydn: English Songs; Mozart: Masonic Cantata
  - Mark Padmore; Kristian Bezuidenhout, accompanist
- Nessun Dorma – The Puccini Album
  - Jonas Kaufmann; Antonio Pappano, conductor (Kristīne Opolais, Antonio Pirozzi & Massimo Simeoli; Coro Dell'Accademia Nazionale Di Santa Cecilia; Orchestra Dell'Accademia Nazionale Di Santa Cecilia)
- Rouse: Seeing; Kabir Padavali
  - Talise Trevigne; David Alan Miller, conductor (Orion Weiss; Albany Symphony Orchestra)
- St. Petersburg
  - Cecilia Bartoli; Diego Fasolis, conductor (I Barocchisti)

Best Classical Compendium

- **Paulus: Three Places of Enlightenment; Veil of Tears & Grand Concerto**
  - Giancarlo Guerrero, conductor; Tim Handley, producer
- As Dreams Fall Apart – The Golden Age of Jewish Stage and Film Music (1925–1955)
  - New Budapest Orpheum Society; Jim Ginsburg, producer
- Ask Your Mama
  - George Manahan, conductor; Judith Sherman, producer
- Handel: L'Allegro, Il Penseroso Ed Il Moderato, 1740
  - Paul McCreesh, conductor; Nicholas Parker, producer
- Woman at the New Piano
  - Nadia Shpachenko; Marina A. Ledin & Victor Ledin, producers

Best Contemporary Classical Composition

- **Paulus: Prayers & Remembrances**
  - Stephen Paulus, composer (Eric Holtan, True Concord Voices & Orchestra)
- Barry: The Importance of Being Earnest
  - Gerald Barry, composer (Thomas Adès, Barbara Hannigan, Katalin Károlyi, Hilary Summers, Peter Tantsits & Birmingham Contemporary Music Group)
- Norman: Play
  - Andrew Norman, composer (Gil Rose & Boston Modern Orchestra Project)
- Tower: Stroke
  - Joan Tower, composer (Giancarlo Guerrero, Cho-Liang Lin & Nashville Symphony)
- Wolfe: Anthracite Fields
  - Julia Wolfe, composer (Julian Wachner, The Choir of Trinity Wall Street & Bang on a Can All Stars)

=== Music Video/Film ===
Best Music Video

- "**Bad Blood**" – Taylor Swift featuring Kendrick Lamar
  - Joseph Kahn, video director; Ron Mohrhoff, video producer
- "LSD" – ASAP Rocky
  - Dexter Navy, video director; Shin Nishigaki, video producer
- "I Feel Love (Every Million Miles)" – The Dead Weather
  - Cooper Roberts & Ian Schwartz, video directors; Candice Dragonas & Nathan Scherrer, video producers
- "Alright" – Kendrick Lamar
  - The Little Homies & Colin Tilley, video directors; Brandon Bonfiglio, Dave Free, Andrew Lerios & Luga Podesta, video producers
- "Freedom" – Pharrell Williams
  - Paul Hunter, video director; Candice Dragonas & Nathan Scherrer, video producers

Best Music Film

- **Amy** – (Amy Winehouse)
  - Asif Kapadia, video director; James Gay-Rees, video producer
- Mr. Dynamite: The Rise of James Brown – (James Brown)
  - Alex Gibney, video director; Peter Afterman, Blair Foster, Mick Jagger & Victoria Pearman, video producers
- Sonic Highways – Foo Fighters
  - Dave Grohl, video director; John Cutcliffe, John Silva, Gaby Skolnek & Kristen Welsh, video producers
- What Happened, Miss Simone? – (Nina Simone)
  - Liz Garbus, video director; Liz Garbus, Amy Hobby, Jayson Jackson & Justin Wilkes, video producers
- The Wall – Roger Waters
  - Sean Evans & Roger Waters, video directors; Clare Spencer & Roger Waters, video producers

== Special Merit Awards ==
=== MusiCares Person of the Year ===
- Lionel Richie

=== Lifetime Achievement Award ===
- Ruth Brown
- Celia Cruz
- Earth, Wind & Fire
- Herbie Hancock
- Jefferson Airplane
- Linda Ronstadt
- Run-DMC

=== Trustees Award ===
- John Cage
- Fred Foster
- Chris Strachwitz

=== Technical Grammy Award ===
- EMT
- Harvey Fletcher

=== Music Educator Award ===
- Phillip Riggs (of North Carolina School of Science and Mathematics in Durham, North Carolina)

== Grammy Hall of Fame inductions ==
Title	Artist	Record label	Year of release	Genre	Format
American Beauty	Grateful Dead	Warner Bros.	1970	Country Rock	Album
The Basement Tapes	Bob Dylan and The Band	Columbia	1975	Roots Rock	Album
"Boom Boom"	John Lee Hooker	Vee-Jay	1962	Blues	Single
"Celebration"	Kool & the Gang	De-Lite	1980	Post-disco	Single
"Cold Sweat Part 1"	James Brown & his Orchestra	King	1967	Funk	Single
"The Dark End of the Street"	James Carr	Goldwax	1967	Soul	Single
"Don't Sit Under the Apple Tree (with Anyone Else but Me)"	The Andrews Sisters	Decca	1942	Pop	Single
Ella and Louis	Ella Fitzgerald and Louis Armstrong	Verve	1956	Vocal Jazz	Album
"The Fat Man"	Fats Domino	Imperial	1949	Rock and roll	Single
First Take	Roberta Flack	Atlantic	1969	Vocal Jazz	Album
Fleetwood Mac	Fleetwood Mac	Reprise	1975	Soft Rock	Album
"For the Love of Money"	The O'Jays	Philadelphia International	1973	R&B	Single
"Heart of Glass"	Blondie	Chrysalis	1978	Disco	Single
"I Love Rock 'n' Roll"	Joan Jett with the Blackhearts	Boardwalk	1981	Hard Rock	Single
"The Loco-Motion"	Little Eva	Dimension	1962	Pop	Single
Lush Life	John Coltrane	Prestige	1961	Jazz	Album
"Margaritaville"	Jimmy Buffett	ABC	1977	Pop	Single
Miles Smiles	Miles Davis Quintet	Columbia	1967	Jazz	Album
Pretenders	The Pretenders	Sire	1980	Punk Rock	Album
Randy Newman	Randy Newman	Reprise	1968	Baroque Pop	Album
"Rock Island Line"	Lead Belly	Asch Records	1937	Blues	Single
"She's About a Mover"	Sir Douglas Quintet	Tribe Records	1965	Garage Rock	Single
"She's Not There"	The Zombies	Decca	1964	Beat	Single
"This Train"	Sister Rosetta Tharpe	Decca	1939	Gospel	Single
"(What Did I Do to Be So) Black and Blue"	Louis Armstrong & his Orchestra	Okeh	1929	Jazz	Single
"You Are So Beautiful"	Joe Cocker	A&M	1974	Pop	Single

== In Memoriam ==
The following individuals were, in order, included in the ceremony's 'In Memoriam' film

- Allen Toussaint
- Maurice White
- B.B. King
- Glenn Frey
- David Bowie
- Ben E. King
- Signe Toly Anderson
- Paul Kantner
- Dan Hicks
- Lemmy Kilmister
- Scott Weiland
- Chris Squire
- Gary Richrath
- Lesley Gore
- Lynn Anderson
- Billy Joe Royal
- Buddy Emmons
- Johnny Gimble
- Billy Sherrill
- Percy Sledge
- Michael Masser
- William Guest
- Yvonne Wright
- Mic Gillette
- Joseph Robinson Jr.
- Kool DJ AJ
- Big Kap
- Joan Sebastian
- Clark Terry
- Ornette Coleman
- Phil Woods
- Paul Bley
- Orrin Keepnews
- James Horner
- Robert Stigwood
- Bruce Lundvall
- Billy Ray Hearn
- Stan Cornyn
- Jerry Weintraub
- René Angélil
- Larry Rosen
- Doug Sax
- Cory Wells
- Al Bunetta
- Bill Arhos
- Stan Freberg
- Jimmie Haskell
- Pierre Boulez
- Kurt Masur
- Robert Craft
- Gunther Schuller
- Bobbie Bailey
- Natalie Cole

== Multiple nominations and awards ==
The following artists received multiple nominations:

- Eleven: Kendrick Lamar
- Seven: Taylor Swift, The Weeknd
- Six: Max Martin
- Five: Tom Coyne, Drake, Serban Ghenea, John Hanes
- Four: Alabama Shakes, Sam Holland, John Legend, Ali Payami, Ed Sheeran, Chris Stapleton, Florence Welch, Kanye West, Pharrell Williams
- Three: Florence + the Machine, James Bay, J. Cole, Common, D'Angelo, Diplo, Wiz Khalifa, Morten Lindberg, Matt Maher, Nicki Minaj, Stephan Moccio, Punch Brothers, Charlie Puth, Jason Quenneville, Mark Ronson, Shellback, Jazmine Sullivan
- Two: Joey Alexander, Kristian Bezuidenhout, Jeff Bhasker, Bilal, Mattias Bylund, Andrew Cedar, The Chemical Brothers, Kelly Clarkson, Dave Cobb, Andra Day, DJ Frank E, Shawn Everett, Béla Fleck, Flying Lotus, Foo Fighters, Marshall Gilkes, Noah Goldstein, Jimmy Greene, Buddy Guy, Emmylou Harris, Highly Suspect, Sam Hunt, Michael Ilbert, Jason Isbell, Israel & Newbreed, Elle King, Marina A. Ledin, Victor Ledin, Lil Wayne, Hillary Lindsey, Little Big Town, Bob Ludwig, Raul Malo, Bruno Mars, Paul McCartney, Lori McKenna, Miguel, Blake Mills, Ashley Monroe, Ludovic Morlot, Arturo O'Farrill, Antonio Pappano, Liz Rose, Nathan Scherrer, Maria Schneider, John Scofield, Judith Sherman, Nadia Shpachenko, Skrillex, Slipknot, Mark Anthony Spears, Thundercat, Tobymac, Tyrese, Fetty Wap, Abigail Washburn, Patrick Williams, Charlie Wilson, Anna Wise

The following artists received multiple awards:

- Five: Kendrick Lamar
- Three: Alabama Shakes, Serban Ghenea, John Hanes, Taylor Swift
- Two: Jeff Bhasker, Tom Coyne, D'Angelo, Diplo, Sam Holland, Jason Isbell, Bruno Mars, Mark Ronson, Maria Schneider, Max Martin, Ed Sheeran, Shellback, Skrillex, Chris Stapleton, The Weeknd

== See also ==
- 73rd Golden Globe Awards
- 88th Academy Awards
- 68th Primetime Emmy Awards
- 70th Tony Awards
