= Emma Hjorth, Norway =

Emma Hjorth
- Village
- Interactive map of Emma Hjorth
- Coordinates: 59°53′38″N 10°29′30″E
- Time zone: UTC+01:00 (CET)

Emma Hjorth is a district in the municipality of Bærum, Norway. Together with the district Skui, its population (2007) is 6,281.

== See also ==
- Emma Hjorth
