= Flirting with Disaster =

Flirting with Disaster may refer to:

== Films ==
- Flirting with Disaster (film), 1996 American comedy film written and directed by David O. Russell

== Television ==
- "Flirting with Disaster", the 49th episode of The Simple Life (Goes to Camp 2007 series)
- "Flirting with Disaster", the 32nd episode of Danny Phantom (Season 2: 2005–2006)
- "Flirting with Disaster", the 8th episode of Rules of Engagement (Season 2)
- "Flirting with Disaster", the 6th episode of The Real World: Cancun
- "Flirting with Disaster", the 26th episode of season 6 (170th of the series) of Beverly Hills, 90210
- "Flirting with Disaster", the 3rd episode of The Gregory Hines Show
- "Flirting with Disaster", the 4th episode of Rita Rocks (season 1: 2008–2009)
- "Flirting with Disaster" (American Dad!), the 19th episode of season 6 of American Dad!
- "Flirting with Disaster: Co-Ed Canoe Trip", the 17th episode of Bug Juice

== Music ==
- Flirting with Disaster (soundtrack), soundtrack of film Flirting with Disaster
- Flirting with Disaster (Jill Johnson album), 2011
- Flirting with Disaster (Lorraine Feather album), 2015
- Flirtin' with Disaster, 1979 album by American southern rock band Molly Hatchet
  - Flirtin' with Disaster (song), a song from the above-mentioned Molly Hatchet album
- "Flirting with Disaster", a song by Bruce Willis from his album The Return of Bruno
- Flirting with Disaster, a 2024 EP by Crazy Town
