= David Wax Museum =

- David Wax Museum perform at The Southern, Charlottesville, VA. 12/12/2025

Background information
- Genre: Folk
- Years active: 2009–present
- Spinoffs: The Golden Hours
- Members: David Wax; Suz Slezak
- Website: www.davidwaxmuseum.com

David Wax Museum is a folk and roots rock band blending traditional Mexican son music with Americana in what they call "Mexo-Americana". Husband and wife David Wax and Suz Slezak are its core members. Most of the band's albums have been self-released, supported by grassroots efforts and an active touring schedule. The band has a side project called The Golden Hours, which is an American folk band consisting of the principle members of David Wax Museum and Lowland Hum (Daniel Goans and Lauren Goans). The Golden Hours debut album Terra Nova will be released in 2027.

== History ==
2008-2012

David Wax Museum released its first album, I Turned Off Thinking About, in 2008. Its second album, Carpenter Bird (2009), included many tracks that would become staples in the band's live shows.

In 2010 the band won the Americana category in the 2010 Boston Music Awards and had its breakout after winning a contest for a spot at the 2010 Newport Folk Festival. Paste magazine dubbed the band "the breakout act" of the festival. According to NPR the band made the most of their opportunity at Newport by cheerfully courting fans throughout the day, and by halfway through their set had an enormous crowd. The set ended with the entire band playing unplugged in the middle of the audience.

In 2011, the band released the critically acclaimed album Everything Is Saved, featuring the song "Born with a Broken Heart", which was named Song of the Year in the Boston Music Awards. After playing South by Southwest in 2011, Craig Duff of Time magazine dubbed David Wax Museum one of the "Ten Acts That Rocked South by Southwest". They went on to play the main stage on the final day of the Newport Folk Festival. On the night of their performance, The Huffington Post ran a profile of the band in which Rob Kirkpatrick called them "The Best Band You Might Not Know".

The band released its fourth full-length album, Knock Knock Get Up, in late summer 2012. The Huffington Post called it "louder, richer, fuller, less minimalist and more mature" than the band's previous releases and described it as "an album that will challenge fans" and "leav[e] [them] wanting to play it again." On the day of the official album release, The New York Times published a Q & A with band members Wax and Slezak.

2015- Guesthouse

David Wax Museum released its fifth EP, Guesthouse, on October 16, 2015. A Paste magazine review said that the band took a much more straightforward approach toward folk-pop but the album gets interesting when Wax and Slezak experiment. Paste posits that David Wax Museum is at its best when blending sounds from all over the world, as heard in songs like Guesthouse, Don't Lose Heart, and Everything Changes. Stephen Thompson says that the single Guesthouse is gregarious and wonderfully charming. Wax explained, in an interview NPR interview that the lead single is inspired by two Mexican folk songs from the son jarocho tradition, El Buscapies and La Iguana, adding that he feels like a guest in the Mexican community. A review in Red Line Roots says that the album sounds like a group of wonderful friends getting together to make music with whatever instruments are at hand.

2026 - Present- The Golden Hours

The Golden Hours is an American folk band consisting of the principle members of David Wax Museum (Suz Slezak and David Wax) and Lowland Hum (Daniel Goans and Lauren Goans). The band’s debut album Terra Nova will be released in 2027.

The Golden Hours grew out of the Golden Hour, a blindfolded live music experience created by the four musicians in 2017. The musicians have been touring and recording as David Wax Museum and Lowland Hum for over 20 years. They have been featured on CBS Saturday Morning and NPR’s Tiny Desk, and praised by The New York Times, The Washington Post, TIME, Rolling Stone, and The World Cafe. Their song "Day Wheel" was the WNRN Radio Song of the Day on January 7, 2026.

Originally called Concert In the Blind, the Golden Hour has been a critical success, with audiences saying they feel like children, relearning how to listen and feel in the presence of music. In a 2020 World Cafe podcast, host Stephen Kallao called the Golden Hour Experience a surround sound immersive musical experience that could change the way you experience live music. After performing the Golden Hour since 2017, performing songs by David Wax Museum and Lowland Hum, the musicians started writing music together. In a 2026 interview on New England Public Radio Lauren Goans explained that the musicians began talking about what it would be like to start cowriting songs for the Golden Hour format because it is a uniquely different kind of experience. They started writing and recording songs, thinking that the new songs were exclusively for the Golden Hour. Lauren Goans said when the four musicians cowrite there is no ego and that things move really rapidly, they are able find the shape and form of an idea quickly. Goans explained that once the songs were recorded they realized that the two bands were a new band who could tour and play shows, in which the audience could see them. Lauren Goans said that it was a surprise to all of them to be starting a new band, The Golden Hours. Daniel Goans commented at their first concert as The Golden Hours that the creation of the band was something that happened to them, rather than somethig they set out to do. David Wax said that performing on stage as a traditional band, instead of a group of unplugged musicians playing for a blindfolded audience, has been a fun transition. He told New England Public Radio that playing as The Golden Hours gives them the opportunity to put on a different kind of show and allows them to share the music with a wider group of people.

The Golden Hours Website and Social Media
| Instagram | @thegoldenhoursofficial |
| Website | thegoldenhoursofficial.com |

The Golden Hours- Singles
| Title | Year | Album |
|---|---|---|
| One More Photo | 2026 | Terra Nova |

The Golden Hours- Radio Appearances
| Date | Station | Show | Songs |
|---|---|---|---|
| 12/11/25 | WNRN (Charlottesville, VA) | Interview with Jeff Sweatman | Day Wheel, Hang On Me, Terra Nova, No Words |
| 6/15/2026 | New England Public Media | The Fabulous 413 | Hang on Me, No Words |

The Golden Hours- Concerts
| Date | Venue | Location | Notes |
|---|---|---|---|
| 12/12/2025 | The Southern Cafe & Music Hall | Charlottesville, VA | |
| 2/5/2026 | Sefton Listening Room | Richmond, VA | |
| 2/6/2026 | Scooby Doo Mansion | Washington, DC | |
| 3/12/2026 | The Vault | Charlottesville, VA | |
| 3/21/2026 | Pale Fire Brewery | Harrisonburg, VA | |
| 4/7/2026 | Grey Eagle | Asheville, NC | |
| 4/8/2026 | The Pinhook | Durham, NC | |
| 4/9/2026 | Richmond Music Hall | Richmond, VA | |
| 4/11/2026 | Lititz Shirt Factory | Lititz, PA | |
| 4/12/2026 | 118 North | Wayne, PA | |
| 4/13/2026 | Joe's Pub | New York, NY | |
| 4/14/2026 | Jammin Java | Vienna, VA | |
| 5/9/2026 | Lime Kiln Theater | Lexington, VA | Opened for Hiss Golden Messenger |
| 5/16/2026 | Jefferson Theater | Charlottesville, VA | Opened for Steep Canyon Rangers |
| 6/5/2026 | 3902 House Concert | Richmond, VA | |
| 6/12/2026 | Club Passim | Cambridge, MA | 2 shows |
| 6/14/2026 | Iron Horse | Northampton, MA | |
| 6/15/2026 | Valencia Ballroom | York, PA | |
| 7/10/2026 | Ting Pavilion | Charlottesville, VA | |
| 7/12/2026 | Bryn Mawr Twilight Concerts | Bryn Mawr, PA | With Shovels & Rope |
| 8/15/2026 | The Purple Fiddle | Thomas, WV | |
| 8/19/2026 | Payomet | North Truro, MA | |
| 8/20/2026 | Boston Museum of Fine Arts | Boston, MA | |
| 8/21/2026 | Narrows Center for the Arts | Fall River, MA | |
| 8/22/2026 | Daily Brew Coffee House & Lounge | Falmouth, MA | |
| 8/29/2026 | Summer Hoot Festival | Olivebridge, NY | |
| 9/5/2026 | Nowhere Else Festival | Martinsville, OH | |
| 9/11/2026 | The Southern Cafe & Music Hall | Charlottesville, VA | |
| 10/12/2026 | Pearl Street Waerhouse | Washington, DC | With Ida |
| 12/3/2026 | Potter's Cider | Charlottesville, VA | |
| 12/5/2026 | Arts Incarnate | Harrisonburg, VA | |

== Musical style ==
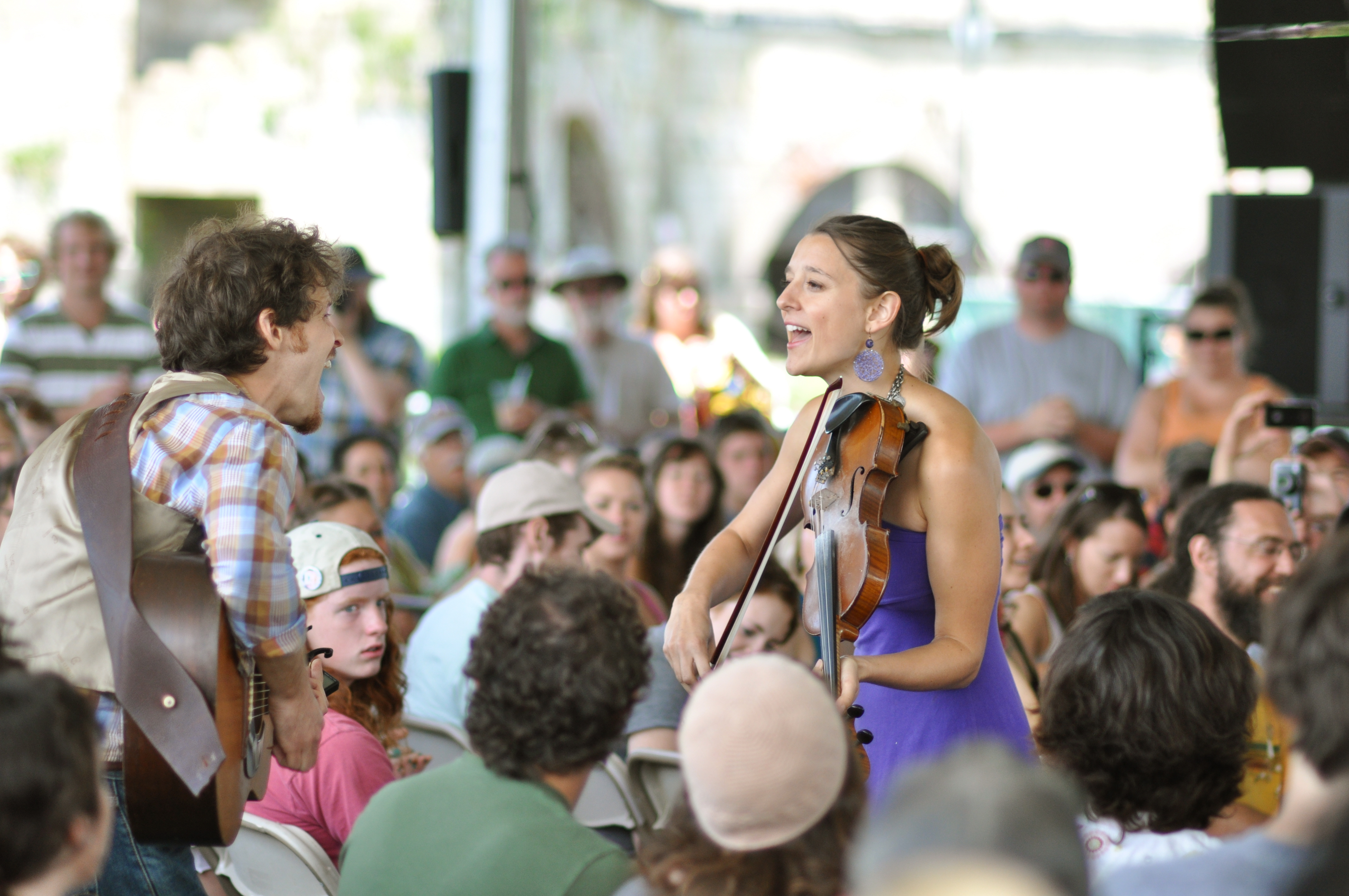
David Wax Museum play at the Newport Folk Festival in 2010 (credit Jess Hodge)

David Wax became interested in rural Mexican folk music after attending Deep Springs College and Harvard University and focuses on different styles of son music. Wax, who hails from Columbia, Missouri, sings and primarily plays the jarana, a Mexican instrument similar to a guitar.

Slezak is a fiddler and vocalist who in the Museum also plays quijada, a percussion instrument made from a donkey's jawbone.

New York Times writer James C. McKinley Jr. described the band's style as "a lively and rustic cross-border mix: lonesome Appalachian harmonies over mariachi horn lines and rhythms you might hear at a rural dance in Veracruz or San Luis Potosí."

== Discography ==
=== Albums ===
| Title | Album details | Peak chart positions | | | Sales |
| Title | Album details | US Folk | US Heat | US Indie | Sales |
|---|---|---|---|---|---|
| I Turned Off Thinking About | Release date: February 7, 2008; Label: David Wax Museum | — | — | — | |
| Carpenter Bird | Release date: September 18, 2009; Label: David Wax Museum | — | — | — | |
| Everything Is Saved | Release date: February 3, 2011; Label: David Wax Museum | — | — | — | |
| Knock Knock Get Up | Release date: September 4, 2012; Label: Mark of the Leopard | — | — | — | |
| Guesthouse | Release date: October 16, 2015; Label: Mark of the Leopard | 20 | 9 | — | |
| Electric Artifacts | Release date: September 8, 2017; Label: Mark of the Leopard | — | — | — | |
| Line of Light | Release date: August 23, 2019; Label: Nine Mile Records | — | 15 | 47 | US: 600 |
| You Must Change Your Life | * Release Date: May 5, 2023: Label: Nine Mile Records | | | | |
"—" denotes releases that did not chart

=== Music videos ===
| Year | Video | Director |
|---|---|---|
| 2012 | "Born with a Broken Heart" | Dina Rudick |
| 2012 | "Will You Be Sleeping?" Part 1 and Part 2 | Monkeywhale Productions |
| 2012 | "Harder Before It Gets Easier" | Shutter & String |
| 2023 | "You Must Change Your Life" | Annie Temmink |
