= Ola Gjeilo =

Norwegian composer and pianist (born 1978)

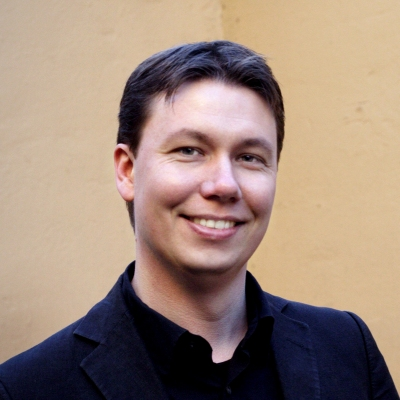
- Gjeilo in 2011
- Born: May 5, 1978 (age 48); Skui, Bærum, Norway
- Occupations: Composer; Pianist
- Website: olagjeilo.com

Ola Gjeilo (/ˈjaɪluː/ YIGH-loo, Norwegian: [ˈûːlɑ ˈjæ̀ɪlʊ]; born May 5, 1978) is a Norwegian composer and pianist in the United States.

He writes choral music, and has written for piano and wind symphony, publishing through Walton Music, Edition Peters, and Boosey and Hawkes.

== Biography ==
Ola Gjeilo was born to Inge and Anne-May Gjeilo, and grew up in Skui, Norway. He began playing piano and composing when he was five years old and learned to read music when he was seven years old. Gjeilo studied classical composition with Wolfgang Plagge. In his undergraduate career, Gjeilo studied at the Norwegian Academy of Music (1999–2001), transferred to the Juilliard School (2001), and studied at the Royal College of Music, London (2002–2004) to receive a bachelor's degree in composition. He continued his education at Juilliard (2004–06) where he received his master's degree in 2006, also in composition. From 2009 to 2010, Gjeilo was composer-in-residence for Phoenix Chorale.

He currently resides in Manhattan, working as a freelance composer. He is currently composer-in-residence with DCINY and Albany Pro Musica.

== Major compositions ==
Sunrise Mass
Orchestrated for strings and choir. "The Ground" for SATB, piano and optional string quartet is based on the last movement of this mass.
Dreamweaver
Written for choir, piano, and string orchestra. The text is set from a popular medieval ballad from Norway, Draumkvedet, translated into English by Charles Anthony Silvestri, one of his regular collaborators.
The River
For choir, piano and string quartet. Composed for the 2016 Brock Commission, awarded from the American Choral Directors Association.

== Discography ==
Note: Piano performed by Ola Gjeilo on all albums.

Choral:

- Dreamweaver (Universal Music, 2023) (with The Choir of Royal Holloway & Royal Philharmonic Orchestra & Rupert Gough)
- Winter Songs (Decca Classics, 2017) (with Choir of Royal Holloway and 12 Ensemble)
- Ola Gjeilo (Decca Classics, 2016) (with Voces8, Tenebrae, and the Chamber Orchestra of London)
- Northern Lights (Chandos, 2012) (with the Phoenix Chorale)

Piano:

- Ordinary Moments (Decca, 2026)
- Dawn (Decca, 2022)
- Night (Decca, 2020)
- Piano Improvisations (2L, 2012)
- Stone Rose (2L, 2007)
