= The Baylor Project =

American jazz band

The Baylor Project is an American jazz duo from New York City. Its members are husband and wife Marcus and Jean Baylor.

== Background ==
Marcus Baylor is from St. Louis, Missouri and was previously the drummer for The Yellowjackets. Jean Baylor was previously a member of R&B group Zhané.

They released their debut album, The Journey, on Be A Light Records in 2017. In 2021, they released a second album, Generations. Later that year, they joined the roster at Motown Music Group. They have been nominated for four Grammy Awards including twice for Best Jazz Vocal Album for The Journey and Generations twice for Best Traditional R&B Performance for the song "Laugh and Move On" and "Sit On Down. Generations won the NAACP Image Award for Outstanding Vocal Jazz Album.

== Discography ==
=== Studio albums ===
- The Journey (2017)
- Generations (2021)
- The Evening (Live at Apparatus) (2022)

=== Singles ===
- "More in Love" (2013)
- "Sit on Down" (2020)
- "#Sitondown (Quarantine Cookout Remix)" (2020)
- "Walk With Me, Lord (SOUND | SPIRIT)" (2024)

== Awards and nominations ==
=== Grammy Awards ===
The Grammy Awards are awarded annually by the National Academy of Recording Arts and Sciences. The Baylor Project has earned 8 nominations.

Year	Award	Nominated work	Result
2018	Best Jazz Vocal Album	The Journey	Nominated
2018	Best Traditional R&B Performance	"Laugh and Move On"	Nominated
2021	Best Traditional R&B Performance	"Sit On Down"	Nominated
2022	Best Jazz Vocal Album	Generations	Nominated
2023	Best Jazz Vocal Album	The Evening (Live at Apparatus)	Nominated
2024	Best Jazz Performance	"Vulnerable (Live)" (with Adam Blackstone and Yellowjackets)	Nominated
2025	Best Jazz Performance	"Walk With Me, Lord (SOUND SPIRIT)"	Nominated
2027	Best Jazz Performance	"Good Life - TAMRON HALL Main Title Theme"	Nominated

=== NAACP Image Awards ===
The NAACP Image Awards are awarded annually by the National Association for the Advancement of Colored People (NAACP). The Baylor Project has won 1 award from 2 nominations.

Year	Award	Nominated work	Result
2022	Outstanding Jazz Album – Vocal	Generations	Won
2023	Outstanding Jazz Album – Vocal	The Evening (Live at Apparatus)	Nominated
