= ScreenPlay (album) =

Studio album by Tierney Sutton
- Released: May 17, 2019
- Genre: Jazz
- Label: BFM

Tierney Sutton chronology
The Sting Variations (2016)	ScreenPlay (2019)

ScreenPlay is a studio album by Tierney Sutton, released on May 17, 2019. The album received a Grammy Award nomination for Best Jazz Vocal Album.

== Track listing ==
1. "The Windmills of Your Mind" – 5:31
2. "Moon River / Calling You" – 4:40
3. "On a Clear Day (You Can See Forever)" – 4:05
4. "What Are You Doing the Rest of Your Life?" (featuring Christian Jacob) – 5:48
5. "I've Got No Strings" (featuring Serge Merlaud) – 4:29
6. "If I Only Had a Brain" (featuring Kevin Axt & Trey Henry) – 5:59
7. "The Sound of Silence" – 5:31
8. "Goodbye for Now" (featuring Kevin Axt & Trey Henry) – 2:27
9. "Diamonds Are a Girl's Best Friend" (featuring Ray Brinker) – 3:23
10. "Hopelessly Devoted to You" (featuring Christian Jacob) – 4:11
11. "You're the One That I Want" – 5:01
12. "How Do You Keep the Music Playing?" (featuring Alan Bergman) – 4:20
13. "Ev'ry Now and Then" (featuring Christian Jacob) – 2:58
14. "It Might Be You" (featuring Serge Merlaud) – 6:24
15. "Arrow" – 2:55
