= Asia Beauty =

Studio album by Ron Korb
- Released: 2015
- Recorded: Kuhl Muzik, Canterbury Music, Glenn Gould Studio
- Genre: Instrumental, world, new-age, classical
- Length: 74:00
- Label: Humbledragon
- Producer: Ron Korb

Asia Beauty is a 2015 studio album by Canadian flutist (flautist) and composer Ron Korb. The compositions are the culmination of Korb's experience of 13 years of travelling and performing in Asia.

Asia Beauty was nominated for Best New Age Album at the 58th Grammy Awards.

== Background ==
Asia Beauty is a recipient of FACTOR juried sound recording program and was released through Humbledragon Entertainment. The album consists of 19 tracks with 3 bonus tracks, composed and produced by Korb, and packaged as a 36-page picture story book with CD. The photography, mostly taken by the composer's photographer wife, is all original from the fascinating places Korb has personally visited.

Korb's Asia Beauty is an instrumental album that travels from the sultry cafés of Vietnam in Hanoi Café to ancient palaces in The House of the Five Beauties to the bamboo forests of Taiwan in Blue Bamboo to the spectacular terraces in China in Two Mountains. Dramatic melodies are brought to life by the fascinating sounds of the traditional Chinese instruments: dizi, erhu, pipa, yangqin, guzheng and the 5000 year old guqin. Other rare Chinese woodwinds showcased include bawu (folk clarinet), xun (ceramic vessel flute), and dadi (bass bamboo flute). The album was recorded in Kuhl Music, Canterbury Music, and Glenn Gould Studio (Canadian Broadcasting Centre), and mastered in Lacquer Channel Mastering, Toronto, Canada. Performances by Korb and a cast of Canadian musicians who complement the cast of Toronto Chinese traditional instrumentalists.

== Awards ==
- 2016 the 58th Grammy Awards Nomination for Best New Age Album
- 2016 International Acoustic Music Awards First Prize Winner for Best Instrumental (track: Two Mountains)
- 2016 One World Music Awards First Prize Winner for Best World/Global Fusion Album
- 2015 Zone Music Reporter Awards for Best World Album
- 2015 The Global Music Awards for Gold Medal - Best of Show
- 2015 The Global Music Awards for Best Instrumental Album
- 2015 The Global Music Awards for Best Instrumental Performance (track: Blue Bamboo)
- 2015 The Global Music Awards for Best Crossover World Music (track: House of the Five Beauties)
- 2015 The Global Music Awards for Best Best Album Art/Graphics (design by Caroline Quan)
- 2015 International Acoustic Music Awards for Finalist in the open song category (track: Hanoi Cafe)

== Track listing ==
The album consists of 19 tracks, all composed and produced by Ron Korb, with three bonus tracks.

No.	Title	Length
1.	"Hanoi Café"	4:11
2.	"Journey Begins"	2:59
3.	"Forbidden Love"	3:26
4.	"Ancient China Prelude"	0:36
5.	"Ancient China"	4:06
6.	"Children's Jig"	2:39
7.	"House of the Five Beauties Prelude"	0:43
8.	"House of the Five Beauties"	4:13
9.	"Two Mountains"	3:09
10.	"Magic Sleep"	7:56
11.	"Palace Garden"	4:16
12.	"Little Jade"	2:53
13.	"The Beautiful Sadness"	3:59
14.	"The Reed Cave"	2:42
15.	"Joyful Rain Prelude"	0:28
16.	"Joyful Rain"	3:09
17.	"Blue Bamboo Prelude"	0:40
18.	"Blue Bamboo"	3:59
19.	"Country Life"	4:33

== Personnel ==
- Ron Korb: producer, composer, flute, bass flute, dizi, dadi, Huber flute, bawu, xun, xiao, penny whistle, kalimba, handpan
- Lin Xiaoqiu: erhu
- Liana Berube: violin
- Larry Crowe: drums, percussion
- Bill Evans: piano, accordion
- Susan Greenway: piano
- Lou Pomanti: piano
- Wendy Zhao: pipa
- Zhang Di: yangqin
- Cynthia Qin: guzheng
- Steve Lucas: acoustic bass, bass
- George Koller: acoustic bass
- Aidan Mason: guitar,
- Bill Bridges: guitar
- Lucas Tensen: cello
- Nan Feihong: guqin, guzheng
- Chris Donnelly: spoons
- Jade Hong: guzheng
- Paul Intson: kalimba, guitar, acoustic bass, recording engineer
- Sharlene Wallace: Celtic harp
- Ray Hickey Jr.: guitar guzheng
- Ben Riley: drums
- Donald Quan: piano, tabla
- Laila Biali: Piano
- Rick Shadrach Lazar: Percussion
- Ma Xianghua: erhu
- Yi Qin:pipa
- Wang Long: yangqin
- Ren Jie: guzheng
- Gary Honess: recording engineer
- Ron Searles: recording engineer
- Jeremy Darby: mixing engineer
- Phil Demetro: mastering engineer
- Jade Yeh: photography (additional photo credits: Dan Shao, tOine)
- Carolyn Quan: album design
