= Skui, Norway =

Skui
- Village
- Location in Southern Norway Skui (Norway)
- Coordinates: 59°55′51″N 10°26′33″E
- Country: Norway
- Region: Østlandet
- County: Akershus
- Municipality: Bærum
- Time zone: UTC+01:00 (CET)
  - Summer (DST): UTC+02:00 (CEST)

Skui is a district in the municipality of Bærum, Norway. Together with the district Emma Hjort, its population (2007) is 6,281.

== People from Skui ==
- Ola Gjeilo, composer
