= How Love Begins (album) =

Studio album by Nicole Zuraitis
- Released: 2023
- Genre: Jazz

How Love Begins is an album by Nicole Zuraitis. The album earned her a Grammy Award for Best Jazz Vocal Album.

== Track list ==
1. The Good Ways
2. Travel
3. Reverie
4. Let Me Love You
5. Burn
6. Two Fish
7. Well Planned
8. Well Played
9. 20 Seconds
10. Like Dew
11. The Garden
