= World Cafe =

World Cafe may refer to:

- World Cafe (radio program), a syndicated music radio program in the United States
- World café (conversation), a structured conversational process for knowledge sharing
- World Café (album), a 2018 studio album by Ron Korb
