= Phoenix Chorale =

- Choir
- Phoenix Chorale with current Artistic Director Christopher Gabbitas. Photo taken by Chris Loomis.
- Origin: Phoenix, Arizona
- Founded: 1958
- Genre: Chorale Ensemble
- Artistic Director: Christopher Gabbitas
- Headquarters: Phoenix
- Awards: Grammy Award for Best Engineered Album, Classical (2004); Grammy Award for Best Small Ensemble Performance (2009); Grammy Award for Best Choral Performance (2016)
- Website: phoenixchorale.org

The Phoenix Chorale is a professional chamber choir based in Phoenix, Arizona, United States. Led by Artistic Director Christopher Gabbitas since 2019, the Chorale is regarded as one of the finest choral ensembles in North America of the western classical tradition. All of the ensemble's 24 members are professional singers who reside in Arizona. The ensemble has won three Grammy Awards, two of them in collaboration with the Kansas City Chorale.

== History ==
The ensemble formed in 1958 as the Bach and Madrigal Society. After years as an amateur ensemble, the group went fully professional (meaning all the singers are compensated) in 1994 and changed its name to the Phoenix Bach Choir under Swedish conductor Anders Öhrwall. From 1992 until 1998, their conductor was Jon Washburn and in 1999, Charles Bruffy took over as conductor and Artistic Director.

In 2004, they signed a recording contract with Chandos Records. Their 2007 recording of works by Alexander Gretchaninov, made in collaboration with the Kansas City Chorale, was nominated for four Grammy Awards: Best Classical Album, Best Choral Performance, Best Surround Sound Album, and Best Engineered Classical Album—and won in the Engineering category. The group's collaborative recording with the Kansas City Chorale of works by Josef Rheinberger was nominated for two Grammy Awards: Best Choral Performance and Best Surround Sound Album.

In August 2008, the name of the ensemble was changed from the Phoenix Bach Choir to the Phoenix Chorale, and shortly thereafter, the group released a SACD on Chandos Records titled Spotless Rose: Hymns to the Virgin Mary, which received nominations for two Grammy Awards: Best Classical Album and Best Small Ensemble Performance. At the Grammy pre-telecast awards ceremony on February 8, 2009, the Grammy for Best Small Ensemble Performance was awarded to the chorale and its conductor, Charles Bruffy.

In 2016, their collaborative recording with the Kansas City Chorale, Rachmaninoff's All-Night Vigil, was nominated for Grammy Awards for Best Choral Performance and Best Engineered Album, Classical and won the Grammy for Best Choral Performance.

In October 2017, Bruffy concluded his 18-year tenure with the group and in May 2019, after a nearly two-year search, Christopher Gabbitas, a former member of The King's Singers, was announced as the next Artistic Director of the Chorale. Under Gabbitas, the Phoenix Chorale records on the Signum Records label.

== Discography ==
Phoenix Chorale

- A Southwest Christmas (Soundset Recordings, 1997)
- Shakespeare in Song (Chandos Records, 2004)
- A Spotless Rose (Chandos Records, 2008)
- Northern Lights: Choral Works by Ola Gjeilo (Chandos Records, 2012)
- The Christmas Album (Signum Records, 2023)
- Sun Moon Stars Rain (Signum Records, 2025)

Phoenix Chorale and Kansas City Chorale

- Eternal Rest (Chandos Records, 2006)
- Gretchaninov: Passion Week (Chandos Records, 2007)
- Rheinberger: Sacred Choral Works (Chandos Records, 2007)
- Rachmaninoff: All-Night Vigil (Chandos Records, 2015)
