= Ron Korb =

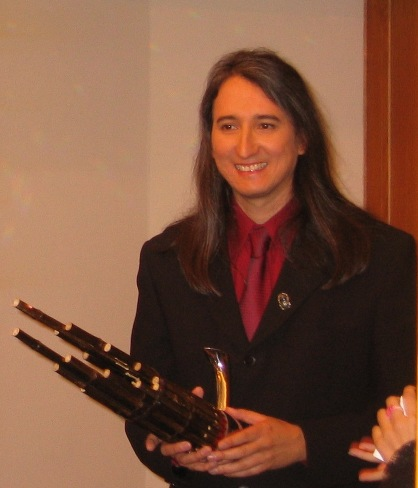
- Ron Korb Asia Tour press conference in Taipei

Background information
- Also known as: 雷恩·寇伯, 龍笛, 龙笛, Longdi, Dragon Flute, Flute Shaman
- Born: Ronald Walter Korb
- Origin: Toronto, Ontario, Canada
- Genres: Classical Crossover, melodic world music, jazz, Latin, Asian music, Celtic music, New-age
- Occupations: Flautist, Composer
- Instrument: Flute
- Years active: 1988–present
- Labels: Humbledragon (Canada); EMI (Hong Kong)
- Website: ronkorb.com

Ron Korb is a multi Grammy-nominated and Juno Award winning Canadian flutist (flautist) and composer.

== Musical style ==
Korb is best known for writing culturally diverse music and his mastery of a wide array of world music wind instruments. His work spans a range of genres including Classical, Jazz, Latin, Asian, Celtic music, and Middle Eastern. Many of his songs are program music based on stories themes that form concept albums. The concepts often come from his exploration of his multi-cultural ancestry and extensive travel experience.

== Education ==
Ron Korb started on the recorder in grade school and later joined an Irish fife and drum band in his teens. While attending the Royal Conservatory of Music, he won several local music competitions. He attended York University for a year to broaden his experience of playing jazz but later earned a scholarship to study classical flute at University of Toronto where he graduated with a degree in music performance. His primary teacher was Douglas Stewart but he also participated in master classes with Paula Robison, Robert Aitken in Shawnigan, Raymond Guiot in Domaine Forget and Michel Debost in Assisi, Italy. After graduating with honors from University, Korb discovered Chinese flutes (Chinese: 笛子, English:Dizi, [pinyin]: dÍ zÎ). The sound of the Asian bamboo flute intrigued him so much that he moved to Japan in the early '90s to study Japanese Gagaku court music, the traditional shinobue and ryūteki bamboo flutes with Akao Michiko. Since then he has travelled around the world collecting and studying indigenous flutes. He has a collection of more than 250 flutes.

== Career ==
Ron Korb has released more than 30 solo albums on various record labels.

Ron has had many collaborations with longtime friend Donald Quan. In 1990 they released Tear of the Sun which charted No. 1 in the Canadian New Age Music Top 40 and in 2001 they did the musical direction for Peter Gabriel's Tribute and Homage for Harbourfront Centre's "World Leaders". The musical talent they shared the stage with included Peter Gabriel, Jane Siberry, Tia Carrere, Arn Chorn-Pond, Jeff Martin, Andy Stochansky and Lorraine Segato. That same year they penned the song for the Toronto Olympic Bid which was performed by the Toronto Symphony, Samba Squad and Nathaniel Dett Chorale in Roy Thomson Hall.

In 2004 Ron Korb Live was released which was filmed in Victoriaville Quebec, directed by Pierre and François Lamoureux and became the first independent artist in Canada to release a full-length DVD.

== Composing ==
Other than writing the instrumental pieces for his albums he has also written songs for major Asian singers. His song for Alan Tam (Chinese: 譚詠麟) achieved Double Platinum sales. Another song recorded by the "Godfather of Cantopop" Roman Tam (Chinese: 羅文) won Best Original Composition at the RTHK awards (Radio Television Hong Kong), Hong Kong's equivalent of the Grammys. In 2008 Ron was asked to put together a book of flute and piano pieces for classical flute exams for the Australian Music Examinations Board Flute for Leisure syllabus. Ron has also composed music for film dance and theatre. In 2012, Ron Korb's classical crossover album Europa (officially released in 2013, won the Global Music Awards, California, in 4 categories including: Award of Excellence-Album, Composition (St. Johann), Album Art/Graphics (Designer: Jade Yeh); Award of Merit: Acoustic Instrumental Solo Performance (St. Johann). His composition, Beckett's Whisper, originally written for Irish flute, pennywhistle, violin, cello, Celtic harp, accordion, double bass and piano, was rearranged by Korb himself for the Canadian Flute Association for flute choir: Piccolo, 4 C Flutes (flute 4 requires low B foot), Alto flute, Bass flute, Contrabass flute. Beckett's Whisper for flute choir was included in the 1st Canadian Flute Convention Closing Program as well as the opening concert of the 2014 National Flute Association (NFA) Convention in Chicago (played by Windy City Flute Orchestra, conducted by Kelly Via)

== Awards and Recognitions ==
- Winner for Juno Award for Classical Album of the Year – Small Ensemble-Mariko Anraku, Conrad Chow, Ron Korb & Rachel Mercer (Kevin Lau: (Kimiko’s Pearl), 2026
- Nominee for 66th Grammy Award for Best Global Music Performance (Kashira), 2025
- Silver Medal Winner – Best Global Fusion (Album: Global Canvas), The Global Music Awards 2026
- Finalist in the open song category (Azure Nights from Album Global Canvas), International Acoustic Music Awards 2026
- First Prize, Best Instrumental Award for (Isla Grande from Global Canvas) 29th Annual USA Songwriting Competition 2024
- Independent Music Award for Best Album – World Beat (World Café), 2018
- Nominee for 58th Grammy Award for Best New Age Album (Asia Beauty), 2016
- First Prize, Best Instrumental (Two Mountains from Asia Beauty), IAMA 2016
- Gold Medal Winner – Best of Show, Best Instrumental Album (Asia Beauty), The Global Music Awards 2015
- Best World Album(Asia Beauty), Zone Music Award 2015
- First Prize, Best World/Global Fusion Album (Asia Beauty), One World Music Awards 2015
- Best Instrumental Performance (Blue Bamboo from Album Asia Beauty), The Global Music Awards 2015
- Silver Medal Winners – Outstanding Achievement, Chinese Crossover World Music (House of the Five Beauties from Album Asia Beauty) and Album Art/Graphics (Asia Beauty), The Global Music Awards 2015
- Finalist in the open song category (Hanoi Café from Album Asia Beauty), International Acoustic Music Awards 2015
- Nominee on Best World Music, Toronto Independent Music Awards 2015
- Grand Prize Winner, Canadian National Exhibition
- 2012 Beckett's Whisper (from Album Europa), Finalist, International Acoustic Music Awards

== Discography ==
- 2024 Global Canvas
- 2018 World Café
- 2015 Asia Beauty
- 2013 Europa
- 2010 Oriental Angels vs Ron Korb DVD, China
- 2009 Once Upon A Time (龍笛傳說), Taiwan
- 2009 Dragon Heart (龍の心), Singapore
- 2008 Native Earth (聖靈大地), Taiwan
- 2007 Ron Korb 龙笛 - 当代第一魔笛, China
- 2006 Our Native Land
- 2006 East West Road, Singapore
- 2005 Rainforest Flute - Ron Korb and Ken Davis, Australia
- 2005 Seasons: Christmas Carols – with Donald Quan
- 2005 Ron Korb Live (Singapore)
- 2004 Ron Korb Live DVD
- 2004 Ron Korb Live CD
- 2004 Celtic Quest (重返祕世界), Taiwan
- 2003 Romancing the Dragon - The Best of Ron Korb, Singapore
- 2003 World of Ron Korb
- 2002 Taming the Dragon (龍笛), Taiwan
- 2001 Behind the Mask (東方戀), Taiwan
- 2001 Celtic Heartland (心靈祕境), Taiwan
- 2000 Celtic Heartland
- 2000 Celtic Quest
- 2000 Rencontre en Provence, France
- 1999 Tapestries - Titanic Odyssey
- 1999 Mada Minu Tomo e, Japan
- 1999 Taming The Dragon
- 1998 Celtic Skye
- 1998 Natural Friends (UK)
- 1996 Tapestries - Celtic Dawn
- 1995 Behind the Mask
- 1994 Flute Traveller
- 1993 Japanese Mysteries – with Hiroki Sakaguchi
- 1990 Tear of the Sun – with Donald Quan

=== Single ===
- 2025 Desire
- 2025 La La Formosa
- 2025 Kindness
- 2025 Peace Flute
- 2025 Three Kingdoms
- 2024 Blue Heron
- 2024 Azure Nights
- 2024 Dream of the King
- 2024 Bass Flute Bossa
- 2024 Hinamatsuri 2024
- 2024 Angkor Wat 2024
- 2024 Isla Grande 2024
- 2023 Christmas in Prague (remix)
- 2023 Havana Sun (Feat. Hilario Duran)
- 2022 St. Johann (video Version)
- 2021 Plenty Nan (Le Studio Version)
- 2019 Sister of the Wind
- 2016 Behind the Mask
