= Charles Bruffy =

American choral conductor

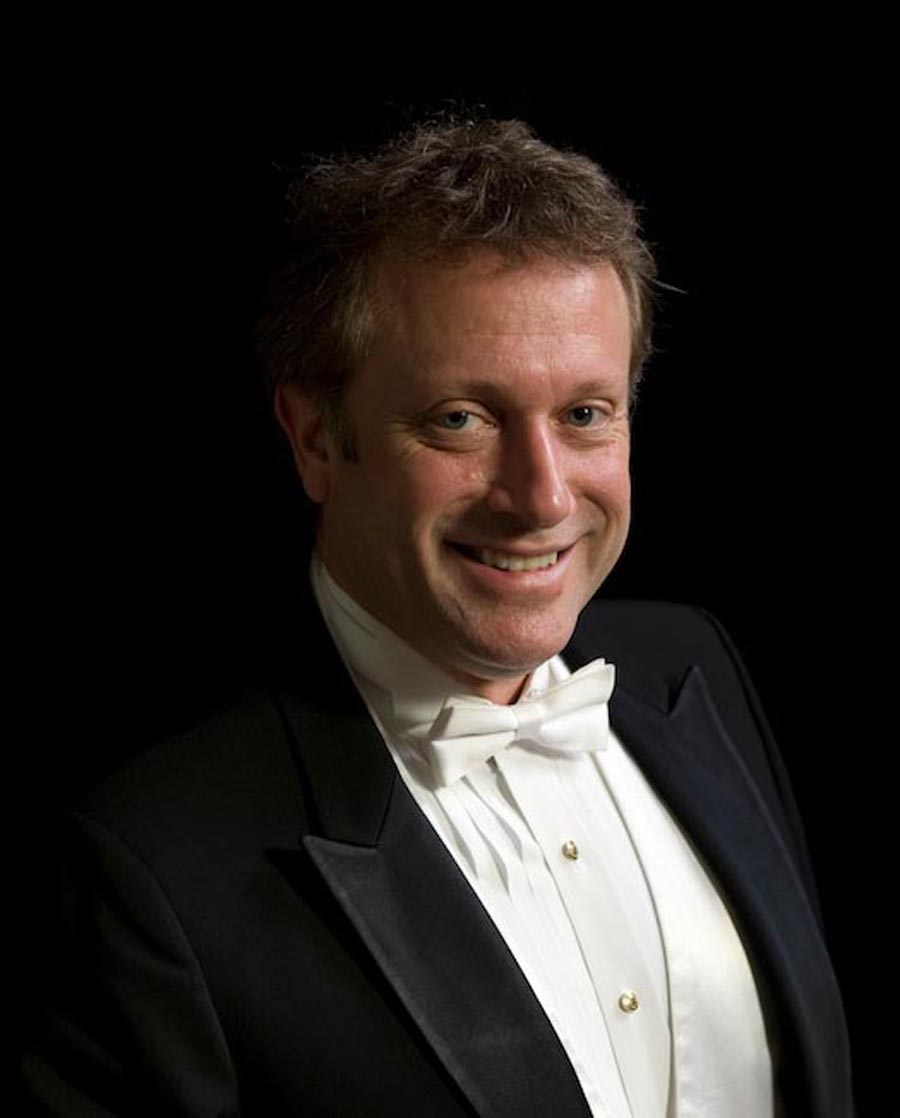
Charles Bruffy

Charles Bruffy (born 1958) is an American choral conductor. He was artistic director of the Kansas City Chorale in Kansas City, Missouri, and is formerly the Chorus Director of the Kansas City Symphony. He lives in Kansas City.

== Education and career ==
Charles Bruffy received his bachelor's degree in piano performance from Missouri Western State College in St. Joseph, Missouri, and a master's degree in vocal performance from the Conservatory of Music at the University of Missouri Kansas City. He received the Spotlight Alumni Award from the Conservatory of Music at UMKC's 1999 Alumni Awards Luncheon. He received the UMKC Class of 2016 Alumni Award for the Conservatory. In October 2017 he received the Signature Sinfonian award from the Phi Mu Alpha Sinfonia fraternity.

Bruffy began his career as a tenor soloist for Robert Shaw (conductor), performing with the Robert Shaw Festival Singers for recordings and concerts in France and at Carnegie Hall in New York. Shaw encouraged Bruffy's development as a conductor, and in 1996 he was invited by American Public Media's Performance Today to help celebrate Shaw's eightieth birthday with an on-air tribute. In 1999, The New York Times named Bruffy as the late Shaw's potential heir. Bruffy served as the artistic director of the Kansas City Chorale from 1988 to 2026. He also served as Director of Music at Rolling Hills Presbyterian Church for many years. He was the Chorus Director of the Kansas City Symphony Chorus from 2008 to 2025.

Bruffy conducts workshops and clinics both across the US and internationally. In 2015, he conducted the Texas All-State Choir. He presented workshops and conducted one of his choirs, the Kansas City Chorale, for the Association of Canadian Choral Communities at Podium 2014 – Halifax, Nova Scotia, in 2014. He was a clinician for the Anúna International Choral Summer School in 2013, and his past engagements include clinics and conducting in Beijing, China; Sydney, Australia and Incheon, Korea among other cities. He has taught at the Westminster Choir College Summer Conducting Institute in Princeton, New Jersey, every summer since 2006.

He is a member of the Advisory Boards of the Atlanta Young Singers of Callanwolde and WomenSing in the San Francisco Bay area, and he served on the board of Chorus America for seven years. Bruffy has commissioned and premiered works by composers such as Ola Gjeilo, Matthew Harris, Anne Kilstofte, Libby Larsen, Zhou Long, Cecilia McDowall, Stephen Paulus, Steven Sametz, Philip Stopford, Steven Stucky, Joan Szymko, Eric Whitacre, Jean Belmont and Chen Yi. He has edited scores for the Roger Dean Company, a division of The Lorenz Corporation, which publishes a choral series specializing in music for professional ensembles and sophisticated high school and college choirs.

== Awards and recognition ==
Bruffy received three Grammy Awards as a conductor, and his albums received five Grammys total. He received the 2008 Grammy for "Best Small Ensemble Performance" with the Phoenix Chorale for Spotless Rose. He won the 2012 Grammy for "Best Choral Performance" with the Kansas City Chorale for Life and Breath: Music of René Clausen which also won the Grammy for Best Engineered Album-Classical. His recording Rachmaninoff: All Night Vigil with the combined voices of the Kansas City Chorale and the Phoenix Chorale won the 2015 Grammy for Best Choral Performance. His breakthrough recording was Alexander Gretchaninov's Passion Week, also featuring the two Chorales together. It won the 2007 Grammy Award for "Best Engineered Classical Album".

His albums were nominated for 12 Grammy Awards total, including four nominations in 2007 for Passion Week, two in 2008 for Sacred Choral Works of Josef Rheinberger, two in 2008 for Spotless Rose, two in 2012 for Life and Breath, and two in 2015 for All-Night Vigil.
