= Flirting with Disaster (Lorraine Feather album) =

Studio album by Lorraine Feather
- Released: 2015
- Genre: Jazz
- Label: Jazzed Media

Lorraine Feather chronology
Attachments (2013)	Flirting with Disaster (2015)

Flirting with Disaster is a 2015 jazz album by Lorraine Feather. It earned Feather a Grammy Award nomination for Best Jazz Vocal Album.
