= World Café (album) =

Studio album by Ron Korb
- Released: 2018
- Recorded: Toronto, Canada
- Studio: Kuhl Muzik
- Genre: world
- Length: 45:00
- Label: Humbledragon
- Producer: Ron Korb

World Café is a 2018 studio album by Canadian flutist and composer Ron Korb. The compositions are mainly inspired by Korb's experience travelling to the countries in the Spanish speaking world such as Spain, Cuba, and the countries of South America.

The album was released through Humbledragon Entertainment and consists of 12 original tracks, composed and produced by Korb, and packaged as a 24-page picture story book with CD.

== Track listing ==
The album consists of 12 tracks, all composed and produced by Ron Korb.

No.	Title	Length
1.	"Bailar Conmigo (Dance With Me)"	3:24
2.	"Sans Regret"	2:29
3.	"Cordoba"	3:53
4.	"Hilario"	4:03
5.	"Island Life"	3:22
6.	"Argentina"	5:52
7.	"Take My Hand"	4:37
8.	"Patagonia"	3:02
9.	"Sans Regret Reprise"	1:48
10.	"New Orleans"	3:56
11.	"Carnival"	5:33
12.	"Sans Regret Finale"	2:48

== Personnel ==
- Ron Korb: producer, composer, flute, bass flute, ocarina
- Hilario Durán: piano
- Joseph Macerollo: accordion
- Johannes Linstead: guitar
- Margaret Maria: cello
- Jorge (Papiosco) Torres: congas
- Roberto Riveron: bass
- Richard Fortin: guitar
- Ben Riley: drums
- Steve Lucas: acoustic bass, bass
- Laila Biali: piano
- Larry Crowe: drums, cahon, palmas, maracas, bongos, triangle, shakers
- Bill Evans: piano
- Aidan Mason: guitar
- Bill Bridges: guitar
- Paul Intson: acoustic bass, recording engineer
- Gary Honess: recording engineer, mixing engineer, mastering engineer
- Adrian Ellis: recording engineer
- Jade Yeh: photography, album design

== Reviews ==
'The release of World Café by Canadian flutist / composer Ron Korb sets a new level of excellence in 21st century Contemporary Instrumental fusion music.' – Music Web Express

'Though he's explored the music of many cultures, it all started with jazz, which is still a part of his playing today. We caught up with the Canadian musician, who has just released his 20th album, World Café, a jazz inflected mix of Latin and Caribbean flavored original compositions.' – All About Jazz by Rob Caldwell

'Ron's flute playing is smooth and melodic, he effortlessly drifts from a ballad to a passionate Cuban tempo with ease.' – Dave Milbourne editor, Toronto Jazz

"World Café is an equipoise of beautiful melodies, seductive rhythms, and memorable improvisations that is integrated with love and passion. The artistry of Ron Korb is so brilliant and the album is a perfect representation of intercultural communication at its best. I encourage all music listeners to check out this album." – Dr. José Valentino
