= Kansas City Chorale =

The Kansas City Chorale is a professional 27-voice chorus conducted by Charles Bruffy. They perform a four concert series in Kansas City, tour nationwide, and perform with their sister choir, the Phoenix Chorale, also conducted by Bruffy. During his tenure as conductor, the chorus has achieved international acclaim. Bruffy, renowned for his fresh interpretations of both traditional and new music, was noted by The New York Times as a disciple of the late Robert Shaw.

The Chorale has premiered works by Maija Einfelde, Jean Belmont Ford, Libby Larsen, Zhou Long, Stephen Paulus, Steven Stucky, Eric Whitacre, and Chen Yi, among other composers.

== History ==
The Kansas City Chorale was founded in 1982 by conductor Jonathan Griffith as part of his DMA graduate work at the University of Missouri-Kansas City’s Conservatory of Music. When Griffith completed his work and moved on, the singers formed a board, hired a new conductor, and continued the choir. Bruffy began conducting the Chorale in 1988. The choir evolved from its “classy sassy” repertoire and bake sale fundraisers to one of the premiere performing arts organizations in North America.

Nimbus Records, based in the United Kingdom, selected the Chorale as its first North American choir. The first album, Nativitas, came out for the holiday season in 1994. Nimbus released four more Chorale recordings over the next four years. The choir performed the world premiere of Leonardo Dreams of his Flying Machine, a setting of Charles Anthony Silvestri's poetry by composer Eric Whitacre at the 2001 American Choral Directors Association National Convention. In 2004 the Chorale traveled to Washington, DC to present a concert at the Library of Congress.

The Chorale joined forces with the Phoenix Chorale (then named Phoenix Bach Choir) to make a joint recording, Eternal Rest, released on the Chandos Records label in 2006. The combined choirs released two more albums with Chandos the following year and released a fourth “two choirs” album in March 2015. The two choirs received international attention when their 2007 Chandos release, Alexander Grechaninov’s Passion Week, received four Grammy nominations and won the Grammy Award for Best Engineered Album, Classical. In 2009, the two choirs performed at Lincoln Center in New York. Later that year, the Chorale sang for the international choir festival at Incheon, South Korea.

Life and Breath, music of René Clausen, the Chorale’s 2012 recording on the Chandos label, won two Grammy Awards. One was for Best Choral Performance, the other, Best Engineered Album, Classical. In 2014 the Chorale travelled to Halifax, Nova Scotia, to perform at Podium, the Association of Canadian Choral Communities' national conference. They joined with the Phoenix Chorale and recorded the All-Night Vigil (Rachmaninoff), which was released in March 2015, and won the Grammy Award for Best Choral Performance, Classical, and was also nominated for Best Engineered Album, Classical.

== Reviews ==
“Life and Breath is another in a string of great Kansas City Chorale recordings for Chandos. The Kansas City Chorale is a marvelously responsive choir who communicate all the subtle nuances that makes Clausen's music so special. They sing with tonal purity, beautiful blend and plenty of character. Chandos's audio quality is worthy of such fine performances and captures the Chorale with a natural, warm sound.” Craig Zeichner, Ariama.com

"Grechaninov's Passion Week is a companion cycle to his better known, All-night Vigil, and it is wonderful to hear it complete (bits sometime crop up in anthologies here and there, but it's scarcely known outside Russia). The superlatives have already piled up against Charles Bruffy's name, and deservedly so. There can only be one reason for a label to release repertoire they already had in their catalogue, and that is that the new performance is so striking." William Whitehead, BBC Music Magazine – May 2007 Choral/Vocal CD of the Month.

== Awards ==
In 2007, their recording of Alexander Grechaninov's Passion Week (recorded jointly with the Phoenix Chorale) was nominated for four Grammy Awards, and won for Best Engineered Album, Classical. In 2008, their CD Rheinberger: Sacred Choral Works, also with the Phoenix Chorale, was nominated for Best Choral Performance and Best Surround Sound Album. In 2012, the Kansas City Chorale's recording Life and Breath: Music of René Clausen won the Grammy Award for Best Choral Performance. The album also received a Grammy for its engineer (John Newton, Sound Mirror, Boston, MA). Their most recent collaborative recording with the Phoenix Chorale, Rachmaninoff's All-Night Vigil, won the Grammy Award for Best Choral Performance, Classical, and was also nominated for Best Engineered Album, Classical.

== Recordings ==
The Chorale has produced 11 recordings total, 7 on its own and 4 together with its sister choir, the Phoenix Chorale (formerly Phoenix Bach Choir). All recordings for Chandos Records were recorded using SACD (super audio compact disc) format, a high-definition multi-channel format with greatly improved resolution, surround sound, and clarity far beyond that of traditional compact discs.

== Discography ==
Kansas City Chorale:

- 1994 Nativitas, American carols (Nimbus Records);
- 1995 Fern Hill, American choral music (Nimbus);
- 1996 Liturgy of St. John Chrysostom, Rachmaninoff (Nimbus);
- 1997 Music of Brahms (Nimbus);
- 1998 Alleluia, American hymns (Nimbus);
- Words and Music, music of James Mulholland (Colla Voce);
- 2012 Life and Breath: Music of René Clausen (Chandos) (winner for BEST CHORAL PERFORMANCE and BEST ENGINEERED ALBUM, CLASSICAL Grammy Awards 2013)
- 2019 Artifacts: The Music Of Michael McGlynn (2Foals)
- 2025 The Mirage Calls (Bright Shiny Things)

Kansas City Chorale and Phoenix Chorale:

- 2006 Eternal Rest, Frank Martin: Mass, etc. (Chandos Records);
- 2007 Passion Week, Alexander Grechaninov (Chandos); (winner for BEST ENGINEERED ALBUM, CLASSICAL, nominated for a total of four Grammy Awards, 2007)
- 2007 Sacred Choral Works of Josef Rheinberger (Chandos) (nominated for two Grammy Awards 2008)
- 2015 All-Night Vigil, Sergei Rachmaninoff (Chandos) (Winner of Grammy Award for Best Choral Performance, Classical, and also nominated for Best Engineered Album, Classical)
