= Lorraine Feather =

American singer-songwriter (born 1948)

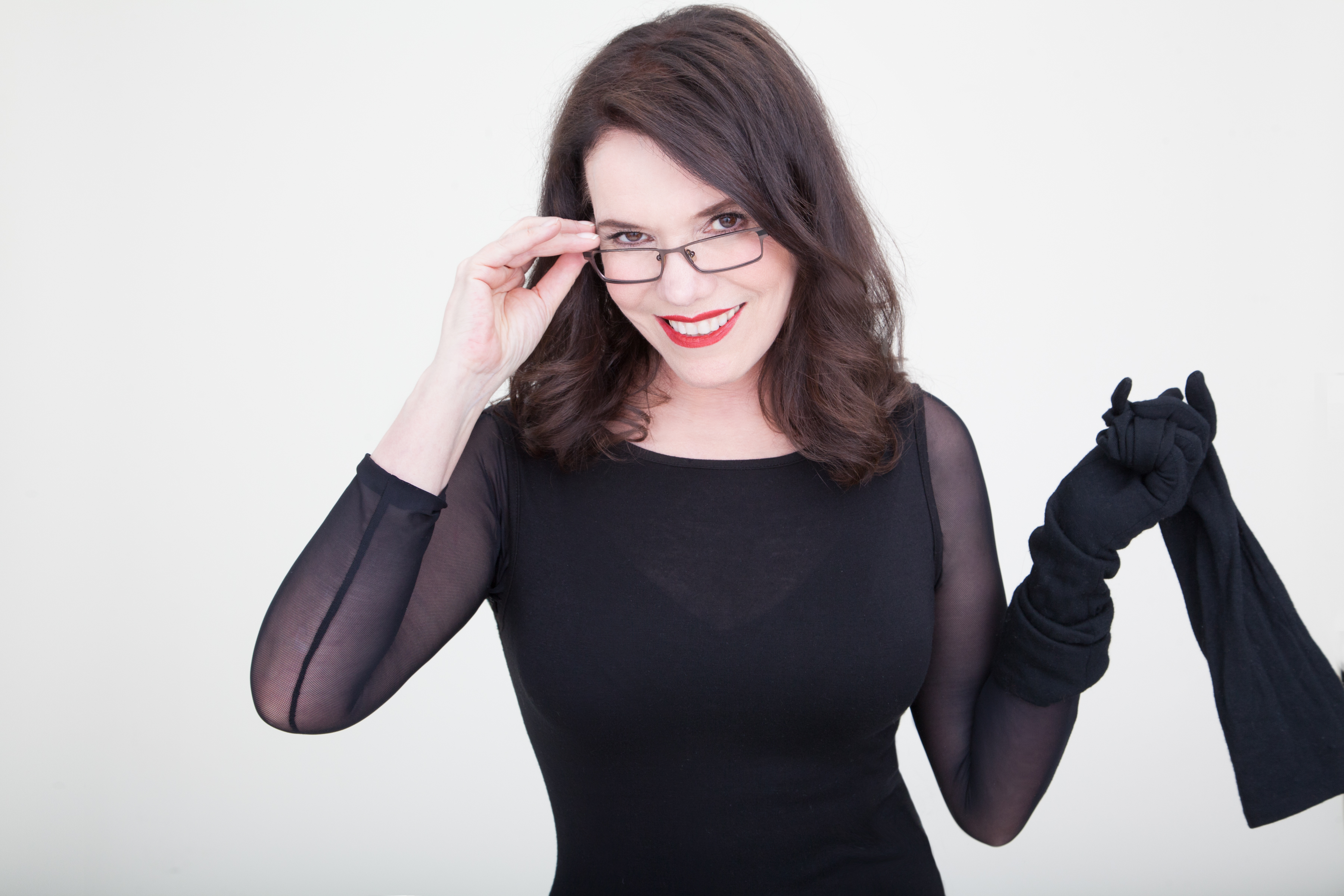
- Feather in 2014

Background information
- Born: Billie Jane Lee Lorraine Feather; September 10, 1948 (age 77); Manhattan, New York, U.S.
- Genres: Jazz
- Occupations: Singer, lyricist, songwriter
- Instrument: Vocals
- Years active: 1967–present
- Labels: Concord Jazz, Sanctuary, Rhombus, Jazzed Media
- Website: lorrainefeather.com

Lorraine Feather (born Billie Jane Lee Lorraine Feather; September 10, 1948) is an American singer, lyricist, and songwriter.

== Early life ==
A native of Manhattan, she was born to jazz writer Leonard Feather and his wife Jane, a former big band singer. She was named Billie Jane Lee Lorraine for her godmother Billie Holiday, her mother's former roommate Peggy Lee, and for the song "Sweet Lorraine".

Three of her albums have been nominated for Grammy Awards in the Best Jazz Vocal Album category: Ages (2010), Attachments (2013), and Flirting with Disaster (2015).

== Discography ==
- Joanne Grauer Introducing Lorraine Feather (MPS, 1978)
- Sweet Lorraine (Concord Jazz, 1978)
- The Body Remembers (Bean Bag, 1996)
- New York City Drag (Rhombus, 2000)
- Such Sweet Thunder (Sanctuary, 2003)
- Cafe Society (Sanctuary, 2003)
- Dooji Wooji (Sanctuary, 2005)
- Language (Jazzed Media, 2008)
- Ages (Jazzed Media, 2010)
- Tales of the Unusual (Jazzed Media, 2012)
- Attachments (Jazzed Media, 2013)
- Flirting with Disaster (Jazzed Media, 2015)
- Math Camp (Relarion, 2018)
