= Emma Hjorth =

Norwegian educator (1858–1921)

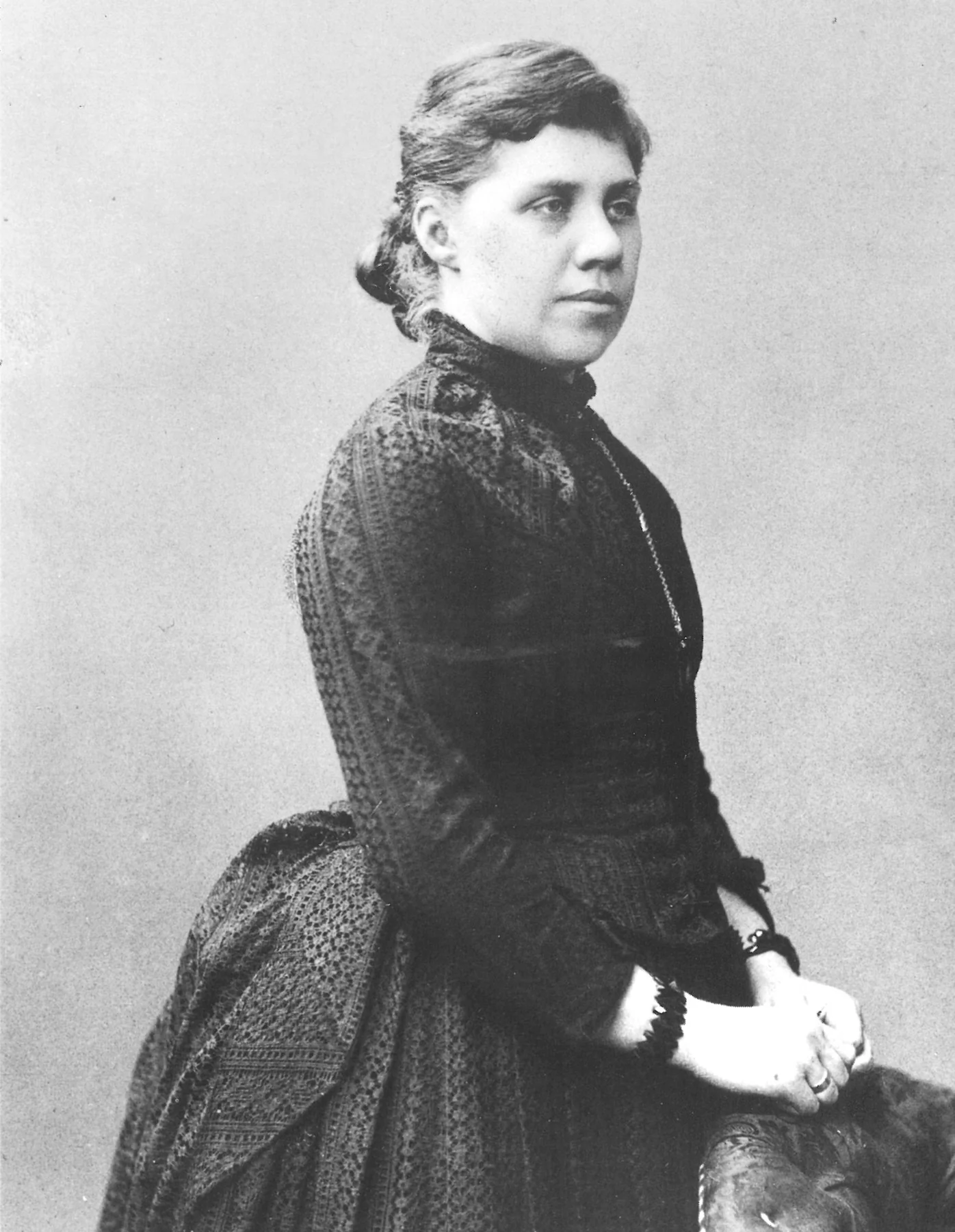
- Born: Emma Alethe Andreasdatter Lippestad; 21 May 1858; Hobøl, Norway
- Died: 2 July 1921 (aged 63); Kristiania, Norway
- Occupation: Educator
- Known for: Founding Norway's first large-scale institution for people with intellectual disabilities
- Spouse: Ingvar Magnus Olsen Hjorth (m. 1890)

Emma Alethe Andreasdatter Hjorth (née Lippestad, 21 May 1858 – 2 July 1921) was a Norwegian educator and founder of the country's first large-scale institution for people with intellectual disabilities.

== Background and education ==
Hjorth was born at Leppestad farm in Hobøl, Norway, to farmer Andreas Andreassen Lippestad and Gunhild Johannesdatter Bovim. She was the sixth of seven children and one of several to have a career in special education. Her brother, Johan Anton Lippestad, was the director for the school system for students with disabilities. Another of her brothers, Carl Thorvald, was also an educator. Women were not allowed to enroll in higher education at the time, so she took the teacher's examination in 1879 individually as a privatist, a person without the right to study.

== Torshov school ==
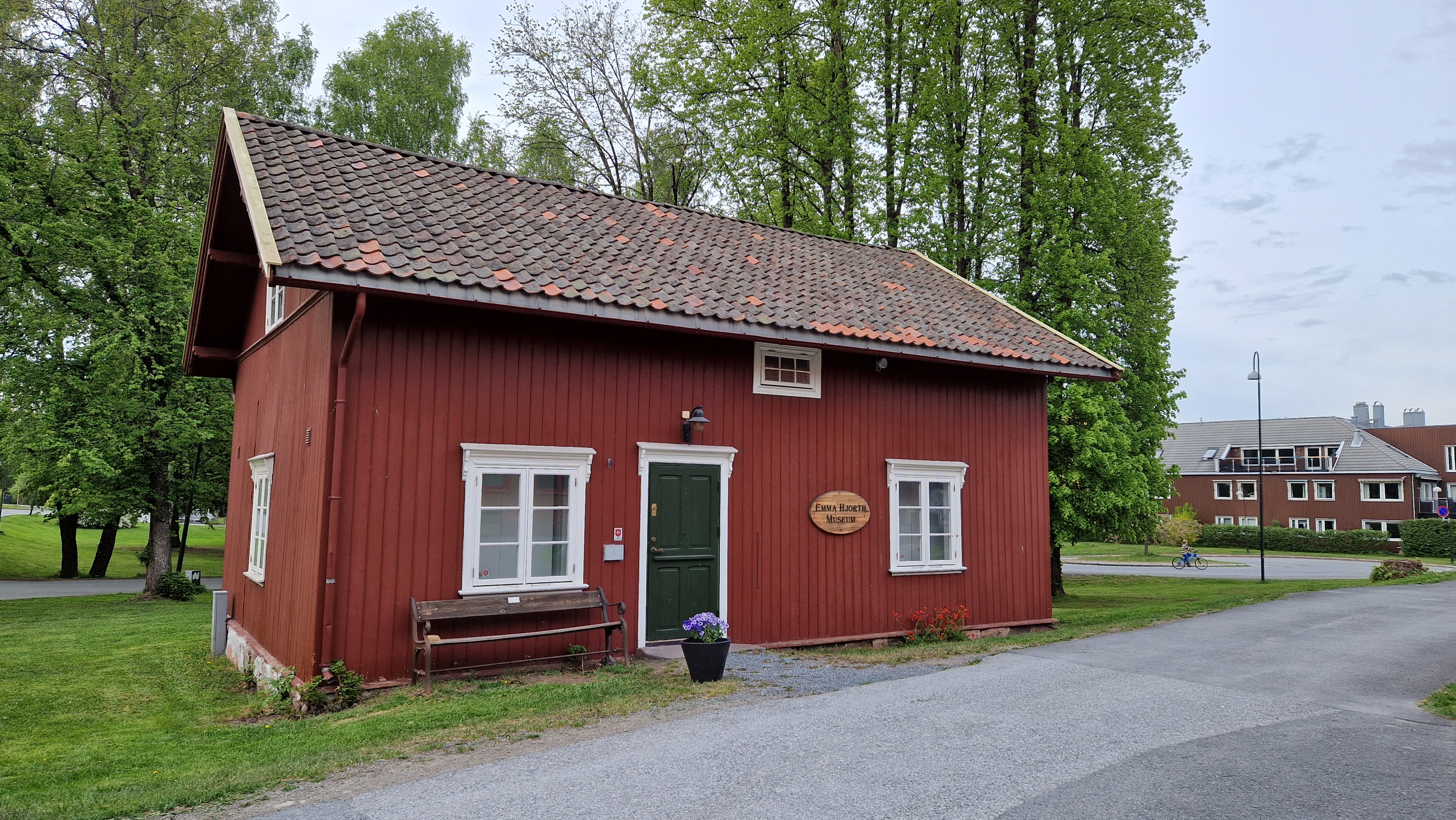
Emma Hjorth Museum in Bærum, Norway

In 1879, she became a teacher at the Thorshaug Institute for Feeble-minded Girls (Thorshaug Institut for Aandsvage Piger, later renamed Torshov Public School for the Mentally Handicapped, Torshov offentlige skole for psykisk utviklingshemmede) in Oslo. The institution had been founded a year earlier by her brother Johan Anton. Six of the seven siblings in the Lippestad family worked at the institute on the Thorshaug farm. The staff also included three sisters with the surname Hjorth; she married their brother, architect Ingvar Magnus Olsen Hjorth in 1890. He was the designer of Norges Bank's second headquarters.

Hjorth undertook several study trips to institutions in the United States and elsewhere in Europe, including to Philadelphia and Boston in 1884.

After seeing children turned away from the Torshov school for being "uneducable" – at a time when the concept of racial hygiene held significant sway – Hjorth's mission became to provide education to such students.

== Emma Hjorth Home ==
In 1898, Hjorth established Norway's first large-scale institution for people with intellectual disabilities, Mrs. Hjorth's Care and Work Home (Fru Hjorths Pleie- og Arbeidshjem). It initially had two residents. The institution was first located in Sjøvolden, Asker, but moved the following year to Solvang, Asker. It was later moved to the Tokerud farm in western Bærum, which she purchased in 1903; it had 42 residents around this time. She contributed the majority of the costs through her tireless fundraising. Twelve years later, ownership of the institution was given to the state. At that time it could hold 100 residents. She was part of its committee until her death in Kristiania (today Oslo) in 1921. It was later renamed the Emma Hjorth Home (Emma Hjorths Hjem), becoming part of Bærum Hospital. It was closed in 1996 due to reforms in the care of people with disabilities and a museum was established in 1998.

== Legacy ==
Upon the transfer of the Emma Hjorth Home to the state in 1915, Hjorth stipulated that the area always be used for people with developmental disabilities. The institution was closed in the 1990s and the Regional Activity Center (Regionalt aktivitetssenter, REGA) was founded by the Municipality of Bærum for the purpose. It consists of five divisions: Emma Gjestehus, a guest house; Emma Kafé, a cafe on the premises of the old central kitchen; Emma Friskhus, a gymnasium and swimming pool; Emma Sansehus, a sensory center; and Emma Hjorth Museum, a permanent exhibit on Norway's social–political history. The museum also has a historical walk called Emmaløypa, featuring a digital map with information points.

== See also ==
- Education in Norway
