= Andraé Crouch discography =

This is a discography for contemporary gospel singer Andraé Crouch.

== Albums ==
=== Andraé Crouch & The Disciples ===
Year	Album	Label	Record producer
1968	Take the Message Everywhere	Light	Ralph Carmichael
1971	Keep On Singin'	Light	
1972	Soulfully	Light	Bill Cole
1973	Live at Carnegie Hall	Light	
1975	Take Me Back	Light	Crouch, Bill Maxwell
1976	This Is Another Day	Light	
1978	Live in London	Light	

=== Solo ===
Year	Album	US Gospel	Label	Record producer
1972	Just Andraé	–	Light	Bill Cole
1979	I'll Be Thinking of You	–	Light	Crouch, Bill Maxwell
1981	Don't Give Up	51 (Note: "Don't Give Up" also reached number 208 on the Billboard albums chart.)	Warner Bros. Records	Bill Maxwell, Bruce Miller
1982	Finally	–	Light	Crouch, Bill Maxwell
1984	No Time to Lose	1	Warner Bros.	Crouch, Maxwell, Bruce Lowe, Phyllis Saint James
1994	Mercy	16	Qwest	Crouch, Scott V. Smith
1997	Pray	9	Warner Bros.	Crouch, Scott V. Smith
1999	The Gift of Christmas	17	Warner Bros.	Crouch, Scott V. Smith
2006	Mighty Wind	19	Verity Records	Crouch, Luther "Mano" Hanes
2011	The Journey	11 (Note: "The Journey" reached number 146 on the Billboard albums chart.)	Riverphlo Entertainment	Crouch, Luther "Mano" Hanes

=== Compilations ===
- 1975: The Best of Andrae Crouch & the Disciples (Light)
- 1981: More of the Best... (Light)
- 1983: Let's Worship Him (Arrival)
- 1986: Autograph (Light)
- 1990: His Best (Arrival)
- 1991: Volume 1, The Classics (Light)
- 1991: Volume 2, We Sing Praises (Light)
- 1991: Volume 3, Contemporary Man (Light)
- 1995: The Light Years (Light)
- 1999: Hall of Fame (CGI)
- 2002: Legends Of Gospel (Light)
- 2002: Mega 3 Collection Vol. 1 & 2 (Light)
- 2003: History Makers (Sparrow Records)
- 2003: Kings of Gospel Andrae Crouch/Walter Hawkins (Universal Special Products)
- 2004: He's Everywhere (Liquid 8)
- 2005: The Definitive Greatest Hits (Compendia Music Group)
- 2005: The Very Best of Andrae Crouch (Lynor)
- 2006: I Got Jesus (St. Clair)
- 2008: Platinum Praise Collection (Light)

== Appearances on other albums ==
- 1968: Teen Challenge Addicts Choir Sherman Andrus, Andraé Crouch, Ruben Fernandez, Laura Lee Myers, Gale Stalhman, Gordon Woods (Word Records)
- 1977: Whole New Thing; Billy Preston (A&M Records)
- 1979: Heavenly Love; The Boones; "Because I Love Him" (Lamb & Lion)
- 1982: He Set My Life to Music; Barbara Mandrell (MCA Records) "Through it All"
- 1985: The Color Purple original motion picture soundtrack (Qwest Records) (piano, organ)
- 1985: Mathematics; Melissa Manchester (MCA)
- 1985: We're Waiting; Sandra Crouch (Light)
- 1987: Bad; Michael Jackson (Epic Records)
- 1988: As Good as It Gets; Deniece Williams (Columbia Records)
- 1988: From Langley Park to Memphis; Prefab Sprout (Epic)
- 1988: Non Stop; Julio Iglesias (Columbia)
- 1988: Back on the Block; Quincy Jones (Qwest)
- 1989: Like a Prayer; Madonna (Sire)
- 1990: Lady with a Song; Nancy Wilson (Columbia)
- 1991: Curtis Stigers; Curtis Stigers (Arista Records)
- 1991: Dangerous; Michael Jackson (Epic)
- 1991: Force Behind the Power; Diana Ross (Motown Records)
- 1991: Free; Rick Astley (RCA Records) "Cry for Help" (choir vocal arrangement)
- 1991: Handel's Messiah: A Soulful Celebration; various artists (Warner Alliance)
- 1992: With All of My Heart; Sandra Crouch (Sparrow)
- 1993: Duets; Elton John (MCA)
- 1993: Once Upon a Forest; James Horner (Fox) "He's Back"
- 1994: The Lion King original soundtrack (Walt Disney Records)
- 1994: The Christmas Album; David Foster (Interscope)
- 1995: HIStory: Past, Present and Future, Book I; Michael Jackson (Epic)
- 1996: Donnie McClurkin; Donnie McClurkin (Warner Alliance)
- 1996: Love Brought Me Back; Helen Baylor (Sony)
- 1996: A Time to Kill original soundtrack (Silver Sounds)
- 1996: Tribute: The Songs of Andrae Crouch; various artists (Warner Bros.) "My Tribute (To God Be the Glory)"
- 1997: Live In Paris; Oslo Gospel Choir (featuring Andrae Crouch and Kristle Murden) (Norske Gram)
- 1997: Blood on the Dance Floor: History in the Mix; Michael Jackson (Epic)
- 1996: Vestal & Friends; Vestal Goodman (Pamplin Music) "You're Able"
- 2000: It Ain't Nothin' But the Blues original Broadway cast album (MCA)
- 2001: Invincible; Michael Jackson (Epic)
- 2005: Glory Train: The Lost Sessions; Pat Boone (Oak Records) "Thank You Billy Graham"
- 2005: Now Is the Time; Anointed (Sony) "Jesus Is Lord"
- 2007: Instrument of Praise; Carman (Tyscot)
- 2008: The Sound; Mary Mary (Columbia)

== Video ==
- 1991: The All-Star Gospel Session (HBO)
- 2004: Hallelujah Gospel
- 2005: First Love: A Historic Gathering of Jesus Music Pioneers
- 2008: Thank You, Billy Graham

=== Gaither Homecoming performances ===
- 1999: Kennedy Center Homecoming "Soon And Very Soon", "The Blood Will Never Lose Its Power"
- 2001: A Billy Graham Music Homecoming Volume Two "Through It All / Can't Nobody Do Me Like Jesus / Soon And Very Soon medley"
- 2002: God Bless America "If It Had Not Been"
- 2008: Rock Of Ages "Through It All"
