= Grammy Award for Best Soul Gospel Performance =

Music award category

The Grammy Award for Best Soul Gospel Performance was awarded from 1969 to 1977. In 1978 the award was divided into two new awards, the Grammy Awards for Grammy Award for Best Soul Gospel Performance, Traditional and Grammy Award for Best Soul Gospel Performance, Contemporary.

Years reflect the year in which the Grammy Awards were presented, for works released in the previous year.

== Recipients ==
Year^{[I]}	Winner(s)	Work	Nominees	Ref.
1969	Dottie Rambo	"The Soul of Me"	"Bread of Heaven, Parts 1 & 2" performed by James Cleveland & Angelic Choir; "Long Walk to D.C." performed by Staple Singers; "Only Believe" performed by Swan Silvertones; "Wait a Little Longer" performed by Davis Sisters; "Willa Dorsey: The World's Most Exciting Gospel Singer" performed by Willa Dorsey	
1970	Edwin Hawkins Singers	"Oh Happy Day"	"Cassietta" performed by Cassietta George; "Come On And See About Me" performed by James Cleveland, Southern California Choir; "Guide Me, O Thou Great Jehovah" performed by Mahalia Jackson; "Precious Memories" performed by Sister Rosetta Tharpe	
1971	Edwin Hawkins	"Every Man Wants To Be Free"	"Amazing Grace" performed by James Cleveland; "Christian People" performed by Andraé Crouch; "God Gave Me a Song" performed by Myrna Summers; "Hello Sunshine" performed by Jessy Dixon	
1972	Shirley Caesar	"Put Your Hand in the Hand of the Man from Galilee"	"Great Moments in Gospel" performed by Clara Ward; "Pass Me Not" performed by Dottie Rambo; "The Five Blind Boys of Alabama" performed by Blind Boys of Alabama; "There Is a God" performed by Valerie Simpson	
1973	Aretha Franklin	"Amazing Grace"	"Jesus Lover Of My Soul" performed by Edwin Hawkins Singers; "Last Mile of the Way" performed by Clara Ward; "My Sweet Lord" performed by B.C. & M. Choir; "Precious Memories" performed by Aretha Franklin, James Cleveland	
1974	Dixie Hummingbirds	"Loves Me Like a Rock"	"Down Memory Lane" performed by James Cleveland; "He Ain't Heavy" performed by Jessy Dixon; "New World" performed by Edwin Hawkins Singers; "You've Got a Friend" performed by Swan Silverstones	
1975	James Cleveland	"In The Ghetto"	"Edwin Hawkins Singers Live" performed by Edwin Hakwins Singers; "Father Alone" performed by Ike Turner; "My Desire" performed by Five Blind Boys; "The Gospel According to Ike and Tina" performed by Ike & Tina Turner	
1976	Andraé Crouch	"Take Me Back"	"God Has Smiled on Me" performed by James Cleveland with Voices of Tabernacle; "Jesus Is the Best Thing" performed by James Cleveland, Charles Fold Singers; "The Storm Is Passing Over" performed by 21st Century; "To the Glory of God" performed by James Cleveland, Southern California Community Choir	
1977	Mahalia Jackson	"How I Got Over"	"Give It to Me" performed by James Cleveland & the Southern California Community Choir; "This Is Another Day" performed by Andrae Crouch & The Disciples; "Touch Me, Vol. 2" performed by James Cleveland & the Charles Fold Singers; "War on Sin" performed by Inez Andrews	
