= Grammy Award for Best Soul Gospel Performance, Contemporary =

Music award category

The Grammy Award for Best Soul Gospel Performance, Contemporary was awarded from 1978 to 1983. A similar award, the Grammy Award for Best Contemporary Soul Gospel Album has been awarded since 1991.

Years reflect the year in which the Grammy Awards were presented, for works released in the previous year.

== Recipients ==
| Year | Winner(s) | Title | Nominees | Ref. |
|---|---|---|---|---|
| 1978 | Eddie Hawkins & the Eddie Hawkins Singers | Wonderful! | Jessy Dixon for Born Again; Mighty Clouds of Joy for God Is Not Dead; Danniebelle for He Is King; Larnelle Harris for More | |
| 1979 | Andraé Crouch & the Disciples | Live in London | Highland Park Community Choir, Inc. for Because He's Jesus; Danniebelle, Choralerna for Danniebelle Live In Sweden with Choralerna; Walter Hawkins for Love Alive II; Shirley Caesar for Reach Out and Touch; Loleatta Holloway for You Light Up My Life | |
| 1980 | Andraé Crouch | I'll Be Thinking of You | Cassietta George for Cassietta In Concert; Myrna Summers for Give Me Something to Hold On to; Bili Thedford for More Than Magic; Various Artists for Push for Excellence; Fountain of Life Joy Choir, Kevin Yancy (director) for Thank You | |
| 1981 | Shirley Caesar | Rejoice | Kristle Murden for I Can't Let Go; Rance Allen Group for I Feel Like Going On; Tramaine Hawkins for Tramaine; Dynamic Disciples for You Don't Know What Go Has Done for Me | |
| 1982 | Andraé Crouch | Don't Give Up | Walter Hawkins for Walter Hawkins: The Hawkins Family; Edwin Hawkins for Edwin Hawkins Live; The Winans for Introducing the Winans; Al Green for The Lord Will Make a Way | |
| 1983 | Al Green | Higher Plane | Edwin Hawkins for Edwin Hawkins Live with the Oakland Symphony Orchestra; Andraé Crouch for Finally; Mighty Clouds of Joy for Miracle Man; Larnelle Harris for Touch Me, Lord | |
