= The McCrarys =

American family gospel and R&B group

- Also known as: The McCrary
- Origin: Youngstown, Ohio, United States
- Genres: Gospel, R&B, soul, disco
- Years active: 1970s–2000's
- Labels: Light; Portrait; Capitol
- Past members: Linda McCrary; Alfred McCrary; Sam McCrary; Charity McCrary; Howard McCrary (1972–1974, 1979–1980)

The McCrarys are an American family gospel and R&B group best known for the songs "You" (featuring Stevie Wonder on harmonica), "Lost in Loving You," "Love on a Summer Night" and "Any Ol' Sunday" (later covered by Chaka Khan). In 2014, they founded The McCrary Foundation, a nonprofit to help those in need through the healing powers of music.

== History ==
Originally from Youngstown, Ohio, the family recording act consisted of siblings Linda, Alfred, Charity, Sam and Howard McCrary. In 1972, the quintet released a gospel album, Sunshine Day on Light Records. When the group moved from gospel to secular music in the mid-1970s, Howard left the group to continue in gospel. The group released their first album "Emerge" on Cat's Eye records in 1973, featuring the title song along with Kung Fu, Be A Father To Your Son, 6 other McCrary tunes and You've Got A Friend. The McCrarys appeared as a group on the 1978 Cat Stevens song "New York Times".

The group relocated to Los Angeles and recorded a series of R&B albums in the late 1970s and early 1980s. Their biggest hit was "You" (written by Alfred, Linda and Sam McCrary), which featured harmonica by Stevie Wonder. A huge R&B single, the song also achieved significant airplay on Pop radio stations, peaking just below the Top 40. It was featured on their debut Portrait album, Loving is Living. On the album's cover notes, Stevie Wonder said about the group: "If it is your desire to experience: Lyrics of sincerity, song and harmony, family in unity, your heart being warmed by universal and intimate loves, then share with me the fulfillment of that desire by experiencing the McCrary family."

Their follow-up album on Portrait was the 1979 release, On the Other Side. It featured the Top 40 R&B single, "Lost in Loving You." The song was written by Alfred McCrary, Linda McCrary and Sundray Tucker.

Howard rejoined the group for their first Capitol release, Just for You. While the 1980 album was not as successful as their previous releases, the song "Any Ol' Sunday" (written by Linda and Alfred McCrary) became a hit single for Chaka Khan on her 1981 What Cha' Gonna Do for Me album.

Howard McCrary did not appear on All Night Music, their next Capitol release. This album featured the single, "Love on a Summer Night."

In 2014, The McCrary's founded The McCrary Foundation Choir. Their first single "Let There Be Peace" was released on October 11, 2016.

== Influence ==
"They sang a fresh, hip, urban style of gospel that was years before its time," said Andrew Hamilton in his biography of the group in the All Music Guide. "They were doing in the early '70s what only became popular decades later."

The group continues to be revered among fans of the Northern Soul movement and is featured on the popular British website, Soulwalking.

== Independent work ==
Linda McCrary has sung backing vocals for Michael Jackson ("Morphine"), Stevie Wonder ("Ordinary Pain"), Melissa Manchester ("Help Is On The Way"), Thelma Houston ("Imaginary Paradise"), Elton John & RuPaul ("Don't Go Breaking My Heart"), Angela Bofill ("On and On"), and on the albums of Andrae Crouch, Sandra Crouch, Emerson, Lake & Palmer (In the Hot Seat), and Juice Newton (Can't Wait All Night), among others. She also co-wrote the Chaka Khan single "Any Old Sunday".

Alfred McCrary has also worked with Andrae Crouch and on sessions with Larnelle Harris. He's also performed with Michael McDonald, Yolanda Adams, Gloria Loring, Michael Card and Frankie Valli & the Four Seasons. Including his work with Sundray Tucker.

Charity McCrary has sung backing vocals for Maria Muldaur ("There is a Love", Al Stewart (Just Yesterday, Russians & Americans), BeBe & CeCe Winans (Relationships), and Stevie Wonder (Songs in the Key of Life), among others. She sang on the soundtrack of The Ladykillers, and co-wrote the Thelma Houston single "Imaginary Paradise".

Howard McCrary has sung backing vocals for Michael Jackson (Invincible), Earth, Wind & Fire (The Promise, In the Name of Love), and for albums recorded by Bette Midler, Quincy Jones, and Andrae Crouch, among others. He also released the 1985 gospel album, So Good, for the A&M-distributed Good News label.

Sam McCrary has also recorded with Andrae Crouch, Michael Jackson, Larnelle Harris, and Candi Staton.

== Discography ==
=== Albums ===
Year	Label	Album	Peak chart positions	
Year	Label	Album	US	R&B
1972	Light	Sunshine Day	-	-
1973	Cats Eye	Emerge	-	-
1978	Portrait	Loving is Living	138	32
1979	Portrait	On the Other Side	-	-
1980	Capitol	Just for You	-	-
1982	Capitol	All Night Music	-	-
2016	IMG	A Very McCrary Christmas		

=== Singles ===
- "Be A Father" / "If It's Difficult", 1973
- "Givin' It Up", 1977
- "Don't Wear Yourself Out" / "You Are The Key", 1978
- "You", 1978
- "Lost in Loving You", 1979
- "Gotta Be In", 1980
- "You Are My Happiness", 1980
- "Any Ol' Sunday" / "The Letdown", 1980
- "Love On A Summer Night", 1982
- "Night Room", 1982
- "It's A Pleasure" / "Love On A Summer Night", with Sheree Brown, 2001
- "Emerge" / "Crystals", with Ron Forella, 2010
