= 23rd Annual Grammy Awards =

1981 US music awards ceremony

- Date: February 25, 1981
- Location: Radio City Music Hall, New York City
- Hosted by: Paul Simon
- Most awards: Christopher Cross (5)
- Most nominations: Christopher Cross (6)

Television/radio coverage
- Network: CBS

The 23rd Annual Grammy Awards were held on February 25, 1981, at Radio City Music Hall in New York City and were broadcast live on American television. They recognized accomplishments by musicians from the year 1980.

Album of the Year went to Michael Omartian and Christopher Cross for Christopher Cross, Record and Song of the Year went to Christopher Cross for "Sailing". Cross was the first artist in Grammy history to win all four General Field awards in a single ceremony, bringing home Record of the Year, Album of the Year, Song of the Year, and Best New Artist.

== Performers ==
- Irene Cara - "Fame"
- The Manhattan Transfer & Chuck Mangione - "Birdland" and "Give It All You Got"
- Aretha Franklin - "I Can't Turn You Loose"
- Barbara Mandrell - "The Best of Strangers"
- George Jones - "He Stopped Loving Her Today"
- The Oak Ridge Boys - "Heart of Mine"
- Gilley's Urban Cowboy Band - "Orange Blossom Special/Hoedown"
- The Archers, Cynthia Clawson, Andraé Crouch, Tramaine Hawkins, Walter Hawkins, Dony McGuire, Reba Rambo McGuire, and B. J. Thomas - "The Lord's Prayer" (medley)
- Paul Simon - "Late in the Evening"
- Lionel Richie - "Lady"
- Amanda McBroom - "The Rose"
- Christopher Cross - "Sailing"
- Fred Ebb & John Kander - "Theme from New York, New York"

== Presenters ==
- Harry Belafonte & Herb Alpert - Best New Artist
- Al Jarreau & Woody Herman - Best Jazz Fusion Performance Vocal or Instrumental
- The Commodores - Best R&B Female Performance
- Charley Pride & Conway Twitty - Best Country Performance Male and Female; Best Vocal Country Performance Duo or Group
- Rev. James Cleveland & James Blackwood - Best Gospel Performance
- Judy Collins & Harry Chapin - Announced winners in previous categories
- Andy Gibb & Dionne Warwick - Best Pop Male Performance
- Donna Summer & Michael McDonald - Album of the Year
- Placido Domingo - Announced winners in the Classical category
- Olivia Newton-John & Peter Allen - Song of the Year
- Diana Ross & Kris Kristofferson - Record of the Year
- Paul Simon - Paid tribute to John Lennon
- Rodney Dangerfield & Anne Murray - Best Pop Vocal Performance Female
- Eartha Kitt & Sammy Cahn - Best Cast Show Album

== Award winners ==
- Record of the Year
  - Michael Omartian (producer) & Christopher Cross for "Sailing"
- Album of the Year
  - Michael Omartian (producer) & Christopher Cross for Christopher Cross
- Song of the Year
  - Christopher Cross for "Sailing"
- Best New Artist
  - Christopher Cross

=== Children's ===
- Best Recording for Children
  - David Levine & Lucy Simon (producers) for In Harmony: A Sesame Street Record performed by various artists

=== Classical ===
- Best Classical Orchestral Recording
  - Raymond Minshull (producer), Georg Solti (conductor) & the Chicago Symphony Orchestra for Bruckner: Symphony No. 6 in A
- Best Classical Vocal Soloist Performance
  - Henry Lewis (conductor), Leontyne Price & the Philharmonia Orchestra for Prima Donna, Vol. 5 - Great Soprano Arias From Handel to Britten
- Best Opera Recording
  - Gunther Breest, Michael Horwath (producers), Pierre Boulez (conductor), Toni Blankenheim, Franz Mazura, Yvonne Minton, Teresa Stratas & the Orchestre de l'Opera de Paris for Berg: Lulu
- Best Choral Performance, Classical
  - Carlo Maria Giulini (conductor), Norbert Balatsch (chorus master) & the Philharmonia Orchestra & Chorus for Mozart: Requiem
- Best Classical Performance- Instrumental Soloist or Soloists (with orchestra)
  - Bernard Haitink (conductor), Itzhak Perlman, Mstislav Rostropovich & the Concertgebouw Orchestra for Brahms: Violin and Cello Concerto in A Minor (Double Concerto)
  - Seiji Ozawa (conductor), Itzhak Perlman & the Boston Symphony Orchestra for Berg: Violin Concerto/Stravinsky: Violin Concerto in D
- Best Classical Performance - Instrumental Soloist or Soloists (without orchestra)
  - Itzhak Perlman for The Spanish Album
- Best Chamber Music Performance
  - Itzhak Perlman & Pinchas Zukerman for Music for Two Violins (Moszkowski: Suite For Two Violins/Shostakovich: Duets/Prokofiev: Sonata for Two Violins)
- Best Classical Album
  - Gunther Breest, Michael Horwath (producers), Pierre Boulez (conductor), Toni Blankenheim, Franz Mazura, Yvonne Minton, Teresa Stratas, & the Orchestre de l'Opera de Paris for Berg: Lulu

=== Comedy ===
- Best Comedy Recording
  - Rodney Dangerfield for No Respect

=== Composing and arranging ===
- Best Instrumental Composition
  - John Williams (composer) for The Empire Strikes Back
- Best Album of Original Score Written for a Motion Picture or a Television Special
  - John Williams (composer) for The Empire Strikes Back
- Best Instrumental Arrangement
  - Jerry Hey & Quincy Jones (arrangers) for "Dinorah, Dinorah" performed by George Benson
- Best Arrangement Accompanying Vocalist(s)
  - Christopher Cross & Michael Omartian (arrangers) for "Sailing" performed by Christopher Cross
- Best Arrangement for Voices
  - Janis Siegel (arranger) for "Birdland" performed by The Manhattan Transfer

=== Country ===
- Best Country Vocal Performance, Female
  - Anne Murray for "Could I Have This Dance?"
- Best Country Vocal Performance, Male
  - George Jones for "He Stopped Loving Her Today"
- Best Country Vocal Performance by a Duo or Group
  - Emmylou Harris & Roy Orbison for "That Lovin' You Feelin' Again"
- Best Country Instrumental Performance
  - Gilley's Urban Cowboy Band for "Orange Blossom Special/Hoedown"
- Best Country Song
  - Willie Nelson (songwriter) for "On the Road Again"

=== Folk ===
- Best Ethnic or Traditional Recording
  - Norman Dayron (producer) for Rare Blues performed by various artists

=== Gospel ===
- Best Gospel Performance, Traditional
  - Blackwood Brothers for We Come to Worship
- Best Gospel Performance, Contemporary or Inspirational
  - The Archers, Cynthia Clawson, Andrae Crouch, Tramaine Hawkins, Walter Hawkins, Dony McGuire, Reba Rambo & B.J. Thomas for The Lord's Prayer
- Best Soul Gospel Performance, Traditional
  - James Cleveland & the Charles Fold Singers for Lord, Let Me Be an Instrument
- Best Soul Gospel Performance, Contemporary
  - Shirley Caesar for Rejoice
- Best Inspirational Performance
  - Debby Boone for With My Song I Will Praise Him

=== Historical ===
- Best Historical Reissue Album
  - Keith Hardwick (producer) for Segovia - The EMI Recordings 1927-39

=== Jazz ===
- Best Jazz Vocal Performance, Female
  - Ella Fitzgerald for A Perfect Match
- Best Jazz Vocal Performance, Male
  - George Benson for "Moody's Mood"
- Best Jazz Instrumental Performance, Soloist
  - Bill Evans for I Will Say Goodbye
- Best Instrumental Jazz Performance, Group
  - Bill Evans for We Will Meet Again
- Best Instrumental Jazz Performance, Big Band
  - Count Basie for On the Road
- Best Jazz Fusion Performance, Vocal or Instrumental
  - The Manhattan Transfer for "Birdland"

=== Latin ===
- Best Latin Recording
  - Cal Tjader for La Onda Va Bien

=== Musical show ===
- Best Cast Show Album
  - Andrew Lloyd Webber (producer and composer), Tim Rice (producer and lyricist) & the original cast with Patti Lupone & Mandy Patinkin for Evita – Premiere American Recording

=== Packaging and notes ===
- Best Album Package
  - Roy Kohara (art director) for Against the Wind performed by Bob Seger & The Silver Bullet Band
- Best Album Notes
  - David McClintick (notes writer) for Trilogy: Past, Present and Future performed by Frank Sinatra

=== Pop ===
- Best Pop Vocal Performance, Female
  - Bette Midler for The Rose
- Best Pop Vocal Performance, Male
  - Kenny Loggins for This Is It
- Best Pop Performance by a Duo or Group with Vocal
  - Barbra Streisand & Barry Gibb for Guilty
- Best Pop Instrumental Performance
  - Bob James & Earl Klugh for One on One

=== Production and engineering ===
- Best Engineered Recording, Non-Classical
  - James Guthrie (engineer) for The Wall performed by Pink Floyd
- Best Engineered Recording, Classical
  - Karl-August Naegler (engineer), Pierre Boulez (conductor) & the Orchestre de l'Opera de Paris for Berg: Lulu (Complete Version)
- Producer of the Year, (Non-Classical)
  - Phil Ramone
- Classical Producer of the Year
  - Robert Woods

=== R&B ===
- Best R&B Vocal Performance, Female
  - Stephanie Mills for "Never Knew Love Like This Before"
- Best R&B Vocal Performance, Male
  - George Benson for Give Me the Night
- Best R&B Performance by a Duo or Group with Vocal
  - The Manhattans for "Shining Star"
- Best R&B Instrumental Performance
  - George Benson for "Off Broadway"
- Best Rhythm & Blues Song
  - James Mtume & Reggie Lucas (songwriters) for "Never Knew Love Like This Before" performed by Stephanie Mills

=== Rock ===
- Best Rock Vocal Performance, Female
  - Pat Benatar for Crimes of Passion
- Best Rock Vocal Performance, Male
  - Billy Joel for Glass Houses
- Best Rock Performance by a Duo or Group with Vocal
  - Bob Seger & the Silver Bullet Band for Against the Wind
- Best Rock Instrumental Performance
  - The Police for "Reggatta de Blanc"

=== Spoken word ===
- Best Spoken Word, Documentary or Drama Recording
  - Pat Carroll for Gertrude Stein, Gertrude Stein, Gertrude Stein

== Trivia ==
- Christopher Cross became the first artist to win all four general-field awards in one night: Record of the Year, Album of the Year, Song of the Year, and Best New Artist.
