= No Time to Lose (Andraé Crouch album) =

Studio album by Andraé Crouch
- Released: 1984
- Studios: PVR Studios (Los Angeles, California); Redwing Studios (Tarzana, California); Sound City Studios (Van Nuys, California); Weddington Studios (North Hollywood, California)
- Genres: Gospel, R&B
- Length: 44:13
- Label: Light Records
- Producers: Andraé Crouch; Bill Maxwell; Bruce Lowe; Phyllis St. James

Andraé Crouch chronology
Finally (1982)	No Time to Lose (1984)	Mercy (1994)

No Time to Lose is a studio album by Andraé Crouch, released in 1984 on Light Records. The album peaked at number one on the US Billboard Top Spiritual Albums chart.

== Critical reception ==
Professional ratings
Review scores
Source	Rating
AllMusic	2/5 stars

AllMusic gave No Time to Lose a 2/5-star rating.

== Accolades ==
Crouch won a Grammy Award in the category of Best Soul Gospel Performance, Male for the track, "Always Remember".

== Track listing ==
All tracks are written by Andraé Crouch.

No.	Title	Length
1.	"Got Me Some Angels"	4:47
2.	"Jesus, Come Lay Your Head on Me"	5:46
3.	"Right Now" (featuring Tata Vega)	4:22
4.	"His Truth Still Marches On" (featuring Linda McCrary/Howard Smith)	5:31
5.	"Oh, It Is Jesus" (featuring Tata Vega)	4:06
6.	"No Time to Lose (I Wanna Be Ready)" (featuring Howard Smith)	5:31
7.	"Livin' This Kind of Life"	6:03
8.	"Somebody Somewhere Is Prayin' (Just for You)"	4:36
9.	"Always Remember"	3:11

== Credits ==
=== Personnel ===
Vocalists

- Andraé Crouch – lead vocals (1, 3, 6-9), backing vocals, vocal arrangements
- Sandra Crouch – backing vocals
- Marvin Cummings – backing vocals
- Kristle Edwards – backing vocals, lead vocals (2, 8)
- Rodney-Wayne Finney – backing vocals
- Linda McCrary – backing vocals, lead vocals (4)
- Rick Nelson – backing vocals
- Phyllis St. James – backing vocals, vocal contractor
- Alfie Silas – backing vocals
- Howard Smith – backing vocals, lead vocals (4, 6)
- Tata Vega – backing vocals, lead vocals (3, 5)

Musicians

- Andraé Crouch – keyboards, synthesizers
- Larry Muhoberac – Fender Rhodes, keyboards
- Joe Sample – Fender Rhodes
- Kenneth Ford – synthesizers
- Rhett Lawrence – synthesizers, synthesizer programming
- Bill Maxwell – synthesizers, drums, percussion
- Michael Ruff – synthesizers, synthesizer programming
- James Harrah – guitars
- Andrew Gouche – bass
- Abraham Laboriel – bass
- Alex Acuña – percussion
- John Phillips – woodwinds
- Scott V. Smith – rhythm arrangements

=== Production ===
- Andraé Crouch – executive producer, producer, liner notes
- Bill Maxwell – producer
- Bruce Lowe – co-producer, pre-production engineer
- Phyllis St. James – co-producer
- Denis Degher – engineer, mixdown engineer
- Doug Rider – engineer
- Joe Bellamy – assistant engineer
- Kirk Butler – assistant engineer
- Chris Desmond – assistant engineer
- Larry Hinds – assistant engineer
- Michael C. Ross – assistant engineer
- Tom Seufert – assistant engineer
- Tori Swenson – assistant engineer
- Bernie Grundman – mastering at Bernie Grundman Mastering (Hollywood, California)
- David Del Sesto – production coordinator and contractor
- Paul Gross – cover design graphics
- Harry Langdon – cover photography

== Charts ==
Chart (1984)	Peak position
US Top Spiritual Albums (Billboard)	1
