= Just for You (The McCrarys album) =

Studio album by The McCrarys
- Released: 1980
- Genre: R&B
- Label: Capitol
- Producer: Patrick Henderson

The McCrarys chronology
On the Other Side (1979)	Just for You (1980)	All Night Music (1982)

Professional ratings
Review scores
Source	Rating
AllMusic	2/5 stars

Just for You is an R&B studio album by the Gospel group The McCrarys, which was released in 1980.

One of its songs, "Any Ol' Sunday", was recorded the following year (under the title "Any Old Sunday") by Chaka Khan, for her album What Cha' Gonna Do for Me. Khan's version continues to be popular over a quarter of a century later, appearing in CD compilations.

== Track listing ==
Side One:

1. "Just for You" (Charity McCrary, Marlo Henderson) – 4:07
2. "Your Love" (Alfred McCrary, Charity McCrary, Matza)– 3:20
3. "Fall in Love Again" (Patrick Henderson, Wornell Jones) – 3:33
4. "Any Ol' Sunday" (Alfred McCrary, Linda McCrary) – 4:22
5. "The Letdown" (Howard McCrary) - 4:04

Side Two:

1. "You Are My Happiness" (Patrick Henderson, Wornell Jones) – 3:27
2. "On and On" (Alfred McCrary, Linda McCrary) – 3:24
3. "Gotta Be In" (J. Lind, J. Black) – 3:15
4. "Never Get Away" (Alfred McCrary) – 3:18
5. "The Rite of Love" (Alfred McCrary, Charity McCrary, Patrick Henderson, Creath) – 4:20
