= Pray (Andraé Crouch album) =

Studio album by Andraé Crouch
- Released: May 20, 1997
- Studio: O'Henry Studios, Burbank, CA; Ocean Entertainment, Burbank, CA; S.V.S. Productions, Pasadena, CA
- Genre: Gospel, R&B
- Length: 1:01:49
- Label: Qwest/Warner Bros. Records
- Producer: Andrae Crouch, Scott V. Smith

Andraé Crouch chronology
Mercy (1994)	Pray (1997)	The Gift of Christmas (1999)

Pray is a studio album by Andraé Crouch, released in 1997 on Qwest/Warner Bros. Records. The album peaked at No. 9 on the US Billboard Top Gospel Albums chart.

== Critical reception ==
Professional ratings
Review scores
Source	Rating
AllMusic	4/5 stars

AllMusic gave Pray a 4/5-star rating.

== Accolades ==
Pray received a Grammy nomination for Best Contemporary Soul Gospel Album.

== Track listing ==
No.	Title	Writer(s)	Length
1.	"Lord, I Thank You"	Andraé Crouch	4:51
2.	"He Does All Things Well"	Andraé Crouch/Jetro Dasilva	4:57
3.	"It's Just a Matter of Time"	Andraé Crouch/Scott V. Smith	4:50
4.	"Distraction"	Andraé Crouch/Scott V. Smith	4:09
5.	"Your Love"	Tore W. Aas/Jan Groth	7:36
6.	"Come Closer to Me"	Andraé Crouch	4:51
7.	"Early in the Morning"	Andraé Crouch	5:29
8.	"Pray"	Andraé Crouch/Scott V. Smith	6:30
9.	"I Give It to You"	Andraé Crouch	5:18
10.	"He Brought Me This Far"	Andraé Crouch	7:17
11.	"Until Jesus Comes"	Andraé Crouch	6:01

== Personnel ==
- Abraham Laboriel Sr. – bass
- Alberto Salas – percussion, piano, rhythm arrangements
- Alfie Silas – vocals
- Andraé Crouch – bass, Fender Rhodes, producer, vocals, background vocals
- Andrew Gouché – bass
- Atle Bakken – arranger, drums, synthesizer
- Carolyn Dennis – vocals
- Daniel Johnson – vocals
- Darrell Crooks – guitar
- Debbie McClendon-Smith – vocals
- Jean Johnson – vocals
- Jetro Dasilva – arranger, drums, synthesizer
- Jimmy Neuble – bass
- Jonathan DuBose Jr. – guitar
- Jonathan Webb – vocals
- Justo Almario – saxophone
- Kandy Johnson – vocals
- Kathy Hazzard – vocals
- Kimberly Johnson – vocals
- Kristle Murden – vocals
- Krystal Johnson – vocals
- Linda McCrary-Campbell – vocals
- Maxi Anderson – vocals
- Michael Neuble – drums
- Oren Waters – vocals
- Paul Jackson Jr. – guitar
- Rev. Charles Williams – piano
- Rick Riso – vocals
- Rickey Grundy – organ
- Rose Stone – vocals
- Sandra Crouch – tambourine, vocals
- Scott V. Smith – arranger, drums, producer, synthesizer
- Tata Vega – vocals
- Yvonne Williams – vocals
