= The Lion King (1994 soundtrack) =

1994 soundtrack album by Elton John, Tim Rice and Hans Zimmer

The Lion King: Original Motion Picture Soundtrack
- Artwork for original release

Soundtrack album by Elton John, Tim Rice, Hans Zimmer and various artists
- Released: May 31, 1994
- Recorded: 1992–1994
- Studios: Media Ventures, Los Angeles; Todd-AO Scoring Stage; Angel Recording Studios, London; BOP Studios, Mmabatho
- Genres: World; film score; pop; Afro pop
- Length: 46:40 (1994 original release); 52:08 (2003 Special Edition)
- Label: Walt Disney
- Producers: Hans Zimmer; Mark Mancina; Jay Rifkin; Chris Thomas

Elton John chronology
Duets (1993)	The Lion King: Original Motion Picture Soundtrack (1994)	Chartbusters Go Pop (1994)

Singles from The Lion King: An Original Motion Picture Soundtrack
- 1. "Can You Feel the Love Tonight" Released: May 2, 1994; 2. "Circle of Life" Released: August 9, 1994

Professional ratings
Review scores
Source	Rating
AllMusic	(for 2003 Special Edition)
Robert Christgau	C
Filmtracks	4/5 stars
Smash Hits	3/5
Sputnikmusic	5/5
Vox	(10/10)

The Lion King: Original Motion Picture Soundtrack is the soundtrack album for the eponymous Disney film. It contains songs from the film written by British singer, composer and pianist Elton John and English lyricist Tim Rice, and a score composed by German score composer and music producer Hans Zimmer. Elton John has a dual role of performer for several tracks. Additional performers include South African singer and songwriter Lebo M, American actress and singer Carmen Twillie, American actor and singer Jason Weaver, English actor Rowan Atkinson, American rock singer Joseph Williams, American actress Whoopi Goldberg, English actor Jeremy Irons, American actor Cheech Marin, American actor Jim Cummings, New Jersey actor Nathan Lane, New York actor Ernie Sabella, and American singer Sally Dworsky. The album was released on May 31, 1994, on CD and audio cassette. The soundtrack was recorded in three different countries: the U.S., the U.K. and South Africa. It is the best-selling soundtrack album to an animated film in the United States with over 7 million copies sold, with 4,934,000 copies sold in 1994. An expanded version of The Lion King soundtrack, featuring 30 minutes of previously unreleased material, was released as part of the Walt Disney Records: The Legacy Collection series on June 24, 2014. In 2014, Hot Topic released a vinyl picture disc of the soundtrack.

In 2010, Rhapsody included the soundtrack as one of 10 essential Disney and Pixar soundtracks.

== Track listing ==
All songs are composed by Elton John with lyrics by Tim Rice. All scores are composed by Hans Zimmer.

The Lion King: Original Motion Picture Soundtrack
No.	Title	Performer(s)	Length
1.	"Circle of Life"	Carmen Twillie; Lebo M; South African Chorus	4:00
2.	"I Just Can't Wait to Be King"	Jason Weaver; Rowan Atkinson; Laura Williams; South African Chorus	2:51
3.	"Be Prepared"	Jeremy Irons; Whoopi Goldberg; Cheech Marin; Jim Cummings	3:41
4.	"Hakuna Matata"	Nathan Lane; Ernie Sabella; Joseph Williams	3:34
5.	"Can You Feel the Love Tonight"	Joseph Williams; Sally Dworsky; Nathan Lane; Ernie Sabella; Kristle Edwards; South African Chorus	2:58
6.	"This Land" (score)	Hans Zimmer	2:56
7.	"...To Die For" (score)	Hans Zimmer	4:18
8.	"Under the Stars" (score)	Hans Zimmer	3:46
9.	"King of Pride Rock" (score)	Hans Zimmer	6:00
10.	"Circle of Life"	Elton John	4:52
11.	"I Just Can't Wait to Be King"	Elton John	3:38
12.	"Can You Feel the Love Tonight" (End Title)	Elton John	4:02
Total length:			46:40

=== The Legacy Collection release ===
Walt Disney Records released an expanded edition of The Lion King soundtrack containing an additional thirty minutes of previously unreleased material from the film, as well as a collection of demo versions of cues. This revision contains a new remastered mix by Alan Meyerson.

== Commercial performance ==
The soundtrack shipped over 10 million copies in the U.S. and eventually was 10× platinum in 1995, thus becoming the biggest-selling soundtrack ever from Disney's 1994 animated feature film. Its certification was promoted to Diamond when the award was instituted in 1999 by the RIAA. According to Nielsen Soundscan the soundtrack, as of April 2014, has sold a total of 7.873 million copies in the US. It is also the best-selling vinyl album in the Nielsen SoundScan era (starting 1991), with 1,043,000 copies sold as of June 2014.

== Accolades ==
Awards
Award	Category	Recipient(s) and nominee(s)	Result
Academy Awards	Best Original Song	"Can You Feel the Love Tonight" – Elton John and Tim Rice	Won
Academy Awards	Best Original Song	"Circle of Life" – Elton John and Tim Rice	Nominated
Academy Awards	Best Original Song	"Hakuna Matata" – Elton John and Tim Rice	Nominated
Academy Awards	Best Original Score	Hans Zimmer	Won
British Academy Film Awards	Best Original Music	Hans Zimmer	Nominated
British Academy Film Awards	Best Sound	Terry Porter, Mel Metcalfe, David Hudson, Doc Kane	Nominated
Golden Globe Awards	Best Original Song	"Can You Feel the Love Tonight" – Elton John and Tim Rice	Won
Golden Globe Awards	Best Original Song	"Circle of Life" – Elton John and Tim Rice	Nominated
Golden Globe Awards	Best Original Score	Hans Zimmer	Won
Grammy Awards	Song of the Year	"Can You Feel the Love Tonight" – Elton John and Tim Rice	Nominated
Grammy Awards	Song of the Year	"Circle of Life" – Elton John and Tim Rice	Nominated
Grammy Awards	Best Song Written Specifically for a Motion Picture or for Television	"Can You Feel the Love Tonight" – Elton John and Tim Rice	Nominated
Grammy Awards	Best Song Written Specifically for a Motion Picture or for Television	"Circle of Life" – Elton John and Tim Rice	Nominated
Grammy Awards	Best Score Soundtrack for Visual Media	Hans Zimmer	Nominated
Grammy Awards	Best Male Pop Vocal Performance	"Can You Feel the Love Tonight" performed by Elton John	Won
Grammy Awards	Best Musical Album for Children	Mark Mancina, Jay Rifkin, Chris Thomas, Hans Zimmer	Won
Grammy Awards	Best Instrumental Arrangement Accompanying Vocalist(s)	Hans Zimmer and Lebo Morake – "Circle of Life" (performed by Carmen Twillie)	Won
MTV Movie Awards	Best Song from a Movie	"Can You Feel the Love Tonight" – Elton John	Nominated

== Personnel ==
Song Tracks (1–5 & 10–12)

- Elton John – composer (1–5, 10, 11, 12), piano and vocals (10, 11, 12)
- Davey Johnstone – guitars (10, 11, 12), backing vocals, (10, 11)
- Chuck Sabo – drums (10, 11, 12), backing vocals (10, 11), strings (12)
- Phil Spalding – bass (10, 11, 12), backing vocals (10, 11)
- Guy Babylon – keyboards (10, 11, 12)
- The London Community Gospel Choir – choir (10, 11)
- Lebo M – vocal arranger (1, 2, 3), background vocals (1, 2, 3), co-lead vocals (1), African chant (1)
- Mark Mancina – arrangements (2, 4, 5)
- Hans Zimmer – arrangements (1, 3) music supervision (1–5)
- Nathan Lane, Ernie Sabella – lead vocals (4, 5)
- Jacqueline Barron, Charles Biddle Jr., Mary Carewe and Louis Price – background vocals (2, 3)
- Richard Harvey – ethnic pipes (2, 3)
- Joseph Williams – co-lead vocals (4, 5)
- Rodney Saulsberry – background vocals (1, 4)
- Carmen Twillie – lead vocals (1)
- Jason Weaver – lead vocals (2)
- Samantha Caras - co-lead vocals (4)
- Jeremy Irons – spoken word and lead vocals (3)
- Whoopi Goldberg, Cheech Marin – spoken words (3)
- Jim Cummings – co-lead vocals (3)
- Rowan Atkinson, Laura Williams – co-lead vocals (2)
- Kristle Edwards – co-lead vocals (5)
- Sally Dworsky – co-lead vocals (5)
- Rick Astley, Gary Barlow, Kiki Dee – background vocals (12)
- Nick Glennie-Smith, Mbongeni Ngema, Andraé Crouch – vocal arrangements (1)
- Jay Rifkin – arrangements (4)
- Edie Lehmann Boddicker, Zolile Zulu, Terry Young, Yvonne Williams, John West, Oren Waters, Maxine Waters, Luther Waters, Julia Waters, Sam Vamplew, Thandazile, Khuluiwe S’thole, Susan D. Stevens, Sindisiwe Sokhela, Kipizane Skweyiya, Happy Skhakhane, Alfie Silas, Philile Seme, Rick Riso, Phindile, Bobbi Page, Nini Nkosi, Bongani Ngcobo, Nandi Ndlovu, Bheki Ndlovu, Thembi Mtshali, Nonhlanhla Mkhize, Vusi Mhlongo, Batho Mhlongo, Myrna Matthews, Abner A. Mariri, Khanyo Maphumulo, Tsidi Manye, Rick Logan, James Langa, Ron Kunene, Thembi Kubheka, Skhumbuzo Kubheka, Stella Khumalo, Faca Khulu, Sphiwe Khanyile, Faith Kekana, Bob Joyce, Kuyanda Jezile, Matoab’sane Jali, Clydene Jackson, Linda Cgwensa, Rick Charles, Lucky Cele, Baby Cele, Johnny Britt, Terry Bradford and Maxi Anderson – choir (1)

Score Tracks (6–9)

- Hans Zimmer – arrangements
- Lebo M – vocal arrangements
- Andraé Crouch – choir arrangements
- Nick Glennie-Smith – choir arrangements
- Tonia Duvall – vocal contractor
- Don Davis, Brad Dechter, Gordon Goodwin, Don L. Harper, Larry Kenton, Dave Metzger, Conrad Pope, Carl Rydlund, Mark Watters – orchestrations
- Yvonne Moriarty – additional orchestrations, french horn
- Steve Becknell, David Duke, William Lane, Brian O'Connor, Richard Todd, Brad Warnaar, Phillip Yao – french horns
- Walt Fowler, Malcolm McNab – trumpets
- Sandy DeCrescent – orchestra contractor
- Bruce Fowler – vocal arrangements, trombone
- Alan Kaplan, Charlie Loper, Bill Reichenbach, Phillip A. Teele, Lloyd Ulyate – trombones
- Richard Harvey – flute, ethnic pipes
- Sheree Ali, Monica Zierhut – music coordinator
- Andy Hill – music supervisor

== Technical ==
Greg Penny - Dolby Atmos Mix

== Charts ==
=== Weekly charts ===
Chart (1994–1995)	Peak position
Australian Albums (ARIA)	3
Austrian Albums (Ö3 Austria)	4
Belgian Albums (Ultratop Flanders)	16
Belgian Albums (Ultratop Wallonia)	5
Canada Top Albums/CDs (RPM)	1
Dutch Albums (Album Top 100)	6
German Albums (Offizielle Top 100)	7
Hungarian Albums (MAHASZ)	6
Japanese Albums (Oricon)	20
New Zealand Albums (RMNZ)	1
Swedish Albums (Sverigetopplistan)	4
Swiss Albums (Schweizer Hitparade)	1
US Billboard 200	1

Chart (2003)	Peak position
US Soundtrack Albums (Billboard)	4

Chart (2026)	Peak position
Greek Albums (IFPI)	51

=== Year-end charts ===
Chart (1994)	Position
Australian Albums (ARIA)	6
Canada Top Albums/CDs (RPM)	4
New Zealand Albums (RMNZ)	7
US Billboard 200	4

Chart (1995)	Position
Australian Albums (ARIA)	32
Austrian Albums (Ö3 Austria)	17
Belgian Albums (Ultratop Flanders)	24
Belgian Albums (Ultratop Wallonia)	7
Canada Top Albums/CDs (RPM)	26
Dutch Albums (Album Top 100)	14
German Albums (Offizielle Top 100)	37
Swiss Albums (Schweizer Hitparade)	19
US Billboard 200	10

Chart (2019)	Position
Belgian Albums (Ultratop Flanders)	127
US Soundtrack Albums (Billboard)	25

Chart (2020)	Position
US Soundtrack Albums (Billboard)	23

Chart (2021)	Position
US Soundtrack Albums (Billboard)	16

Chart (2022)	Position
US Soundtrack Albums (Billboard)	20

Chart (2024)	Position
Belgian Albums (Ultratop Flanders)	192

Chart (2025)	Position
US Soundtrack Albums (Billboard)	22

=== Decade-end charts ===
Chart (1990–1999)	Position
US Billboard 200	21

== Certifications and sales ==
Region	Certification	Certified units/sales
Original album release
Australia (ARIA)	4× Platinum	280,000^{^}
Austria (IFPI Austria)	Platinum	50,000^{*}
Belgium (BRMA)	Platinum	50,000^{*}
Brazil	—	1,200,000
Canada (Music Canada)	Diamond	1,200,000
China	—	1,000,000
Denmark (IFPI Danmark)	Platinum	20,000^{‡}
France (SNEP)	Gold	1,000,000
Germany (BVMI)	3× Platinum	1,500,000^{^}
Italy	—	600,000
Japan (RIAJ)	Gold	150,000
Netherlands (NVPI) Mercury Records B.V. edition	Platinum	100,000^{^}
Netherlands (NVPI) Universal Music edition	Gold	50,000^{^}
New Zealand (RMNZ)	Platinum	15,000^{^}
Poland (ZPAV)	Gold	50,000^{*}
Sweden (GLF)	Gold	50,000^{^}
Switzerland (IFPI Switzerland)	2× Platinum	100,000^{^}
United Kingdom (BPI)	Platinum	300,000^{^}
United States (RIAA)	Diamond	10,000,000^{^}
Summaries
Europe (IFPI)	3× Platinum	3,000,000^{*}
Original cast recording
Australia (ARIA)	Gold	35,000^{^}
France (SNEP)	Gold	100,000^{*}
Germany (BVMI)	Gold	250,000^{^}
United Kingdom (BPI)	Gold	100,000^{‡}
United States (RIAA)	Platinum	1,000,000^{^}
Sing-Along shortform
United Kingdom (BPI)	Silver	60,000^{^}
United States (RIAA)	2× Platinum	2,000,000^{^}
Hans Zimmer Re-release
United Kingdom (BPI)	Gold	100,000^{‡}
Summaries
Worldwide	—	20,000,000
^{*} Sales figures based on certification alone.^{^} Shipments figures based on certification alone.^{‡} Sales+streaming figures based on certification alone.

== See also ==
- List of best-selling albums in the United States
- Return to Pride Rock: Songs Inspired by Disney's The Lion King II: Simba's Pride
- The Lion King (2019 soundtrack)
