= The Journey (Andraé Crouch album) =

Studio album by Andraé Crouch
- Released: September 27, 2011
- Studio: Blackbird Studios, Nashville, Tennessee; EastWest Studios, Hollywood, California; Fantasy Studio, Berkeley, California; Firehouse Recording Studios, Pasadena, California; Paragon Studios, Franklin, Tennessee; The River Studios, Scottsdale, Arizona; The Saltmine Studios, Phoenix, Arizona
- Genre: Gospel, R&B
- Length: 1:17:09
- Label: Riverphlo Entertainment
- Producer: Luther "Mano" Hanes

Andraé Crouch chronology
Mighty Wind (2006)	The Journey (2011)	Live in Los Angeles (2013)

The Journey is a studio album by Andraé Crouch, released in 2011 on Riverphlo Entertainment. The album peaked at No. 11 on the US Billboard Top Gospel Albums chart.

== Critical reception ==
Professional ratings
Review scores
Source	Rating
AllMusic	3.5/5 stars

AllMusic's Fred Thomas, in a 3.5/5-star review remarked, "With crisp production from Luther “Mano” Hanes, the album's 15 jubilant tracks meld aspects of contemporary gospel with lively funk and soul elements in an uplifting and celebratory style that has come to be Crouch's calling card."

== Accolades ==
The Journey earned a Grammy nomination for Best Gospel Album.

== Track listing ==
No.	Title	Writer(s)	Length
1.	"Somebody Told Me About Jesus" (featuring Tata Vega)	Andraé Crouch, Luther "Mano" Hanes*	6:21
2.	"Good Time"	Andraé Crouch, Luther "Mano" Hanes*	5:03
3.	"Where Jesus Is" (featuring Linda)	Andraé Crouch	4:09
4.	"He Has a Plan for Me" (featuring Tata Vega)	Andraé Crouch, Luther "Mano" Hanes*	4:06
5.	"Faith" (featuring Kim Burrell and Take 6)	Andraé Crouch	7:15
6.	"When I Think About You" (featuring Markita Knight)	Andraé Crouch, Luther "Mano" Hanes	5:30
7.	"Jesus Came Into My Life" (featuring Daniel Johnson)	Andraé Crouch, Luther "Mano" Hanes*	4:52
8.	"All Around the World" (featuring Chaka Khan & Sheila E.)	Andraé Crouch, Chaka Khan, Luther "Mano" Hanes	7:18
9.	"I Can"	Andraé Crouch, Errol Cooney, Luther "Mano" Hanes	3:17
10.	"Heaven Bound"	Andraé Crouch, Errol Cooney, Luther "Mano" Hanes	5:11
11.	"There's Nobody Like Jesus" (live)(featuring LeAnne Palmore)	Andraé Crouch, Luther "Mano" Hanes*	3:36
12.	"Let the Church Say Amen" (featuring Marvin Winans)	Andraé Crouch	7:48
13.	"God Is on our Side"	Andraé Crouch, Luther "Mano" Hanes	2:03
14.	"The Promise"	Andraé Crouch, Luther "Mano" Hanes	4:40

=== Bonus tracks ===
No.	Title	Length
1.	"The Promise (Marvin's Testimony)" (featuring Marvin Winans)	5:47
2.	"(DVD) The Making of The Journey"	18:32

== Personnel ==
- Aaron Field – Assistant Engineer
- Adam Muñoz – Assistant Engineer
- Adam Smith – Assistant Engineer
- Alberto Hernandez – Assistant Engineer
- Alex Burstein – Executive Producer
- Alfie Silas-Durio – Choir/Chorus, background vocals
- Andraé Crouch – Executive Producer, piano
- Andrew Mendelson – Mastering
- Barry Green – Trombone
- Bob Mintzer – Clarinet, Sax (Soprano)
- Brian Calhoon – Assistant Engineer
- Carl Wheeler – Organ
- Carol Dennis – background vocals
- Chaka Khan – Featured Artist
- Chris Bolton – Choir/Chorus, background vocals
- Dale Davis – Executive Producer
- Dalon Collins – Vocals (Background)
- Damien Lawson – Choir/Chorus, background vocals
- Dan Needham – Drums
- Dan Weinstein – tuba
- Daniel Johnson – featured artist
- Danny Duncan – Engineer
- Deborah Miller – Consultant, Project Administrator
- Derrieux Edgecombe – Organ
- Doug Moffet – Flute
- Ed Woolley – Assistant Engineer
- Ernest Tolbert – Keyboards
- Errol Cooney – guitar
- Eunita Mitchell – Choir/Chorus, background vocals
- Gerald Albright – Flute, Horn Arrangements, Sax (Alto), Sax (Baritone), Sax (Tenor)
- Harry Kim – flugelhorn, trumpet
- Hector Delgado – Assistant Engineer
- James McCrary – background vocals, Choir/Chorus
- Javier Solís – Percussion, Tambourine
- Jeff Ellis – Assistant Engineer
- Jennifer Kummer – French Horn
- Jerard Woods – background vocals
- Jeremy Underwood – Assistant Engineer
- Jewl Anguay – background vocals
- John Daversa – slide trumpet
- John Jaszcz – Mixing
- John W. Gray – Assistant Engineer
- Jon Blass – Assistant Engineer, Pro-Tools
- Josh McGowan – Choir/Chorus, background vocals
- Judith Hill – background vocals
- Justin Salter – Assistant Engineer
- Kala Balch – Choir/Chorus, background vocals
- Ken Sluiter – Assistant Engineer
- Kevin Raleigh – Executive Producer
- Kim Burrell – featured artist
- Kimberly Hanes – Production Coordination
- La Dell Abrams – drums
- LeAnne Palmore – background vocals
- Linda McCrary – Choir/Chorus, Production Coordination, background vocals
- Lloyd Barry – horn arrangements, string arrangements
- Luther "Mano" Hanes – Executive Producer, Fender Rhodes, Keyboard Bass, Keyboards, Piano, Producer, String Arrangements, Wurlitzer Piano
- Markita Knight – Choir/Chorus, background vocals
- Marvin Winans – featured artist
- Matt Pribisco – assistant engineer, mixing
- Maurice Fitzgerald – bass
- Melonie Daniels – background vocals
- Michael Stewart – flugelhorn, trumpet
- Missi Hale – background vocals
- Rance Allen – featured artist
- Reggie Young – trombone
- Rick Watford – guitar
- Ricky Nelson – Choir/Chorus, background vocals
- Rob Salle – Assistant Engineer
- Rodney Wayne – background vocals
- Sam McCrary – Choir/Chorus, background vocals
- Sandra Crouch – Executive Producer
- Selina Albright – background vocals
- Sheila E. – percussion
- Shervonne Wells – background vocals
- Steve Parrick – Trumpet
- Sue Merriett – Choir/Chorus, background vocals
- Suzanne Cadena – Choir/Chorus, background vocals
- Take 6 – featured artist
- Tata Vega – background vocals
- Teddy Campbell – drums
- The Nashville String Machine – strings
- Tim Green – saxophone
- Tom Hemby – acoustic guitar, electric guitar
- Tyrone Jackson – rhythm guitar
- Vonciele Faggette – Choir/Chorus, background vocals
- Will Kennedy – Drums
- Zenia Robinson – Choir/Chorus, background vocals
