= Evita: Premiere American Recording =

Evita – Premiere American Recording

Cast recording by various artists
- Released: 1979 or 1980
- Recorded: 1979
- Length: 90:36
- Label: MCA
- Producer: John McClure

Evita, subtitled Premiere American Recording, is an album containing a recording of Andrew Lloyd Webber and Tim Rice's musical Evita made by its 1979 Broadway cast and released on MCA Records in the same year.

== Recording ==
The album was produced by Webber and Rice themselves.

== Critical reception ==
Professional ratings
Review scores
Source	Rating
AllMusic	4/5 stars

AllMusic rates the album 4 stars on a scale of five.

== Chart performance and sales ==
The album reached number 105 on Billboard's Top LPs & Tapes chart.

According to Billboard, it was "only the second original cast album to be certified Platinum" by the RIAA, the first being Annie from 1977.

== Track listing ==
2 × LP – MCA2-11007

Side 1
No.	Title	Length
1.	"A Cinema in Bueno Aires, 26 July 1952"	1:00
2.	"Requiem for Evita / Oh What a Circus"	9:11
3.	"On This Night of a Thousand Stars / Eva and Magaldi / Eva Beware of the City"	7:35
4.	"Buenos Aires"	4:50
5.	"Goodnight and Thank You"	3:09

Side 2
No.	Title	Length
1.	"The Art of the Possible"	2:40
2.	"Charity Concert / I'd Be Surprisingly Good for You"	5:57
3.	"Another Suitcase in Another Hall"	4:42
4.	"Peron's Latest Flame"	4:25
5.	"A New Argentina"	6:57

Side 3
No.	Title	Length
1.	"On the Balcony of the Casa Rosada / Don't Cry for Me Argentina"	9:32
2.	"High Flying, Adored"	3:45
3.	"Rainbow High"	2:17
4.	"Rainbow Tour"	4:47
5.	"The Actress Hasn't Learned the Lines (You'd Like to Hear)"	2:21
6.	"And the Money Kept Rolling In (and Out)"	4:18

Side 4
No.	Title	Length
1.	"Santa Evita"	2:01
2.	"Waltz for Eva and Che"	3:44
3.	"She Is a Diamond"	3:09
4.	"Dice Are Rolling"	5:06
5.	"Eva's Final Broadcast"	3:11
6.	"Montage"	2:40
7.	"Lament"	2:51

== Charts ==
Chart (1980)	Peak position
US Billboard Top LPs & Tapes	105

== Certifications ==
Region	Certification	Certified units/sales
United States (RIAA)	Platinum	1,000,000^{^}
^{^} Shipments figures based on certification alone.

== Awards ==
Year	Award type	Categories	Results	Ref.
1981	Grammy Awards	Best Cast Show Album	Won	
