= 21st Annual Grammy Awards =

1979 US music awards ceremony

- Date: February 15, 1979
- Location: Shrine Auditorium, Los Angeles, California
- Hosted by: John Denver
- Most awards: Bee Gees (4)
- Most nominations: –

Television/radio coverage
- Network: CBS

The 21st Annual Grammy Awards were held in 1979, and were broadcast live on American television. They recognized accomplishments by musicians from the year 1978.

== Presenters ==
- Donna Summer & Andy Gibb - Record of the Year
- John Denver & Eubie Blake - Best New Artist
- Steve Martin - Best Pop Vocal Performance Male
- Dionne Warwick & Quincy Jones - Best R&B Performance Female
- Paul Williams & Frankie Valli - Best Pop Vocal Performance Female
- Glen Campbell & Tanya Tucker - Best Country Vocal Performance Duo/Group
- Kris Kristofferson & Rita Coolidge - Best Country Performance Male
- Neil Diamond - Album of the Year
- Lily Tomlin - Song of the Year
- Natalie Cole & Lou Rawls - Best Jazz Instrumental Performance, Soloist

== Performers ==
- Alicia Bridges - I Love the Nightlife
- Oscar Peterson
- Chuck Mangione - Feels So Good
- Eubie Blake - I'm Just Wild About Harry
- A Taste of Honey - Boogie Oogie Oogie

== Award winners ==
- Record of the Year
  - Phil Ramone (producer) & Billy Joel for "Just the Way You Are"
- Album of the Year
  - Broadway Eddie, Richard Finch, Albhy Galuten, K.G. Productions, Ron Kersey, Arif Mardin, Bobby Martin, Bill Oakes, Freddie Perren, Karl Richardson, William Salter, Thomas J. Valentino (producers), Bee Gees, Ralph MacDonald, David Shire (producers and artists), Don Renaldo (conductor), Yvonne Elliman, K.C. and the Sunshine Band, Kool & the Gang, Walter Murphy, Tavares & Trammps for Saturday Night Fever Soundtrack
- Song of the Year
  - Billy Joel for "Just the Way You Are"
- Best New Artist
  - A Taste of Honey

=== Children's ===
- Best Recording for Children
  - Jim Henson (producer) for The Muppet Show performed by The Muppets

=== Classical ===
- Best Classical Orchestral Performance
  - Michel Glotz (producer), Herbert von Karajan (conductor) & the Berlin Philharmonic Orchestra for Beethoven: Symphonies (9) (Complete)
- Best Classical Vocal Soloist Performance
  - Luciano Pavarotti for Luciano Pavarotti - Hits From Lincoln Center
- Best Opera Recording
  - George Sponhaltz, John Coveney (producers), Julius Rudel (conductor), Beverly Sills, Alan Titus & the New York City Opera Orchestra for Lehár: The Merry Widow
- Best Choral Performance, Classical (other than opera)
  - Georg Solti (conductor), Margaret Hillis (choir director) & the Chicago Symphony Orchestra & Chorus for Beethoven: Missa Solemnis
- Best Classical Performance Instrumental Soloist or Soloists (with orchestra)
  - Eugene Ormandy (conductor), Vladimir Horowitz & the New York Philharmonic for Rachmaninoff: Con. No. 3 in D Minor for Piano (Horowitz Golden Jubilee)
- Best Classical Performance, Instrumental Soloist(s) (without orchestra)
  - Vladimir Horowitz for The Horowitz Concerts 1977/78
- Best Chamber Music Performance
  - Itzhak Perlman & Vladimir Ashkenazy for Beethoven: Sonatas for Violin and Piano
- Best Classical Album
  - Christopher Bishop (producer), Carlo Maria Giulini (conductor), Itzhak Perlman & the Chicago Symphony Orchestra for Brahms: Concerto For Violin in D

=== Comedy ===
- Best Comedy Recording
  - Steve Martin for A Wild and Crazy Guy

=== Composing and arranging ===
- Best Instrumental Composition
  - John Williams (composer) for "Theme From Close Encounters of the Third Kind"
- Best Album of Original Score Written for a Motion Picture or a Television Special
  - John Williams (composer) for Close Encounters of the Third Kind
- Best Instrumental Arrangement
  - Quincy Jones & Robert Freedman (arrangers) for "The Wiz Main Title - Overture Part One" performed by various artists
- Best Arrangement Accompanying Vocal(s)
  - Maurice White (arranger) for "Got to Get You Into My Life" performed by Earth, Wind & Fire
- Best Arrangement For Voices
  - Bee Gees (arrangers) for "Stayin' Alive"

=== Country ===
- Best Country Vocal Performance, Female
  - Dolly Parton for Here You Come Again
- Best Country Vocal Performance, Male
  - Willie Nelson for "Georgia on My Mind"
- Best Country Performance by a Duo or Group with Vocal
  - Waylon Jennings & Willie Nelson for "Mamas Don't Let Your Babies Grow Up to Be Cowboys"
- Best Country Instrumental Performance
  - Asleep at the Wheel for "One O'Clock Jump"
- Best Country Song
  - Don Schlitz (songwriter) for "The Gambler" performed by Kenny Rogers

=== Folk ===
- Best Ethnic or Traditional Recording
  - Muddy Waters for I'm Ready

=== Gospel ===
- Best Gospel Performance, Traditional
  - The Happy Goodman Family for Refreshing
- Best Gospel Performance, Contemporary or Inspirational
  - Larry Hart for "What a Friend"
- Best Soul Gospel Performance, Traditional
  - Mighty Clouds of Joy for Live and Direct
- Best Soul Performance, Contemporary
  - Andrae Crouch for Live in London performed by Andrae Crouch & the Disciples
- Best Inspirational Performance
  - B. J. Thomas for Happy Man

=== Historical ===
- Best Historical Repackage Album
  - Michael Brooks (producer) for The Lester Young Story, Vol. 3

=== Jazz ===
- Best Jazz Instrumental Performance, Soloist
  - Oscar Peterson for Oscar Peterson Jam - Montreux '77
- Best Jazz Instrumental Performance, Group
  - Chick Corea for Friends
- Best Jazz Instrumental Performance, Big Band
  - Mel Lewis & Thad Jones for Live in Munich
- Best Jazz Vocal Performance
  - Al Jarreau for All Fly Home

=== Latin ===
- Best Latin Recording
  - Tito Puente for Homenaje a Beny More

=== Musical show ===
- Best Cast Show Album
  - Thomas Z. Shepard (producer) & various artists for Ain't Misbehavin'

=== Packaging and notes ===
- Best Album Package
  - Johnny B. Lee & Tony Lane (art directors) for Boys in the Trees performed by Carly Simon
- Best Album Notes
  - Michael Brooks (notes writer) for A Bing Crosby Collection, Vols. I & II performed by Bing Crosby

=== Pop ===
- Best Pop Vocal Performance, Female
  - Anne Murray for "You Needed Me"
- Best Pop Vocal Performance, Male
  - Barry Manilow for "Copacabana (At the Copa)"
- Best Pop Vocal Performance by a Duo or Group
  - The Bee Gees for Saturday Night Fever Soundtrack
- Best Pop Instrumental Performance
  - Chuck Mangione for Children of Sanchez

=== Production and engineering ===
- Best Engineered Recording, Non-Classical
  - Al Schmitt & Roger Nichols (engineers) for "FM (No Static at All)" performed by Steely Dan
- Best Engineered Recording, Classical
  - Arthur Kendy, Edward T. Graham, Ray Moore (engineers), Pierre Boulez (conductor) & the New York Philharmonic for Varese: Ameriques/Arcana/Ionisation (Boulez Conducts Varese)
- Producer of the Year
  - The Bee Gees, Albhy Galuten & Karl Richardson

=== R&B ===
- Best R&B Vocal Performance, Female
  - Donna Summer for "Last Dance"
- Best R&B Vocal Performance, Male
  - George Benson for "On Broadway"
- Best R&B Vocal Performance by a Duo, Group or Chorus
  - Earth, Wind & Fire for All 'n All
- Best R&B Instrumental Performance
  - Earth, Wind & Fire for "Runnin'"
- Best Rhythm & Blues Song
  - Paul Jabara (songwriter) for "Last Dance" performed by Donna Summer

=== Spoken ===
- Best Spoken Word Recording
  - Orson Welles for Citizen Kane
