= Murden =

Murden is a surname. Notable people with the surname include:

- Kristle Murden (born 1956), American singer-songwriter, musician, music producer, vocal coach and ordained minister
- Richard Murden (1906–1997), Australian politician
- Tori Murden (born 1963), American athlete and university administrator
- Kevin Murden (born 1972), British Music producer and writer, entrepreneur, and philanthropist
- David Murden (born 1970), British Music producer and writer, co-founder of UK electronic music group NPZ, entrepreneur
