= Any Ol' Sunday =

"Any Old Sunday"

Single by Chaka Khan
- Released: 1981
- Recorded: 1980
- Genre: Disco; funk
- Label: Warner Brothers
- Songwriters: Alfred McCrary, Linda McCrary
- Producer: Arif Mardin

"Any Ol' Sunday" is a song written by Alfred McCrary and Linda McCrary of the family group, The McCrarys and released on their 1980 Capitol Records album, Just for You. A cover version by Chaka Khan was released as a single the following year as "Any Old Sunday" on the Warner Brothers album, What Cha' Gonna Do for Me. Chaka Khan's version was a hit on Billboard's R&B chart.

== Legacy ==
More than three decades after its initial release, the song continues to be popular. Chaka Khan's version has been re-issued in various compilations. This includes the 2005 Warner Brothers Special Projects release, Natural High 4.

== Personnel ==
Original Version:

- Linda McCrary – vocal
- Howard McCrary – Fender Rhodes
- Charles W. Creath – Hammond B-3
- George Sopuch – guitar
- Derrick Schofield and Bill Maxwell – drums
- Welton Gite – bass
- Randy Brecker – Flugelhorn solo
- Paulinho DaCosta – percussion
- Patrick Henderson – producer

Chaka Khan Version:

- Chaka Khan – vocal
- Arif Mardin – producer
