= 20th Annual Grammy Awards =

1978 US music awards ceremony

- Date: February 23, 1978
- Location: Shrine Auditorium, Los Angeles, California
- Hosted by: John Denver
- Most awards: John Williams (3)
- Most nominations: John Williams

Television/radio coverage
- Network: CBS

The 20th Annual Grammy Awards were held February 23, 1978, and were broadcast live on American television. They were hosted by John Denver and recognized accomplishments by musicians from the year 1977.

== Presenters ==
- Aretha Franklin & Cheech & Chong - Appeared via videotape to wish the Grammy's a happy 20th birthday
- Steve Martin & Chicago - Best New Artist
- David Crosby, Stephen Stills, and Graham Nash - Album of the Year
- Minnie Pearl & Jerry Clower - Best Country Performance Male & Female
- Stephen Bishop & Andy Gibb - Best Pop Vocal Performance Female

== Performers ==
- Shaun Cassidy - That's Rock 'n' Roll
- Count Basie - Sweet Georgia Brown
- Joe Tex - Ain't Gonna Bump No More (With No Big Fat Woman)
- Ronnie Milsap - It Was Almost Like a Song

== Award winners ==
- Record of the Year
  - Bill Szymczyk (producer) & The Eagles for "Hotel California"
- Album of the Year
  - Ken Caillat, Richard Dashut (producers) & Fleetwood Mac (producers and artist) for Rumours
- Song of the Year
  - Barbra Streisand & Paul Williams (songwriters) for "Evergreen (Love Theme from A Star Is Born)" performed by Barbra Streisand
  - Joe Brooks (songwriter) for "You Light Up My Life" performed by Debby Boone
- Best New Artist
  - Debby Boone

=== Children's ===
- Best Recording for Children
  - Christopher Cerf & Jim Timmens (producers) for Aren't You Glad You're You performed by various artists

=== Classical ===
- Best Classical Orchestral Performance
  - Gunther Breest (producer), Carlo Maria Giulini (conductor) & the Chicago Symphony Orchestra for Mahler: Symphony No. 9 in D
- Best Classical Vocal Soloist Performance
  - Neville Marriner (conductor), Janet Baker & the Academy of St. Martin in the Fields for Bach: Arias
- Best Opera Recording
  - Thomas Z. Shepard (producer), John De Main (conductor), Donnie Albert, Carol Brice, Clamma Dale & the Houston Grand Opera Orchestra for Gershwin: Porgy and Bess
- Best Choral Performance (other than opera)
  - Georg Solti (conductor), Margaret Hillis (choir director) & the Chicago Symphony Orchestra & Chorus for Verdi: Requiem
- Best Classical Performance Instrumental Soloist or Soloists (with orchestra)
  - Itzhak Perlman & the London Philharmonic Orchestra for Vivaldi: The Four Seasons
- Best Classical Performance Instrumental Soloist or Soloists (without orchestra)
  - Arthur Rubinstein for Beethoven: Piano Sonata No. 18 in E Flat/Schumann: Fantasiestücke, Op. 12
- Best Chamber Music Performance
  - The Juilliard String Quartet for Schoenberg: Quartets for Strings (Complete)
- Best Classical Album
  - Thomas Frost (producer), Leonard Bernstein (conductor), Dietrich Fischer-Dieskau, Vladimir Horowitz, Yehudi Menuhin, Mstislav Rostropovich, Isaac Stern, Lyndon Woodside & the New York Philharmonic for Concert of the Century

=== Comedy ===
- Best Comedy Recording
  - Steve Martin for Let's Get Small

=== Composing and arranging ===
- Best Instrumental Composition
  - John Williams (composer) for "Main Title From Star Wars"
- Best Original Score Written for a Motion Picture or a Television Special
  - John Williams (composer) for Star Wars
- Best Instrumental Arrangement
  - Harry Betts, Perry Botkin Jr. & Barry De Vorzon (arrangers) for "Nadia's Theme (The Young and the Restless)" performed by Barry De Vorzon
- Best Arrangement Accompanying Vocalist(s)
  - Ian Freebairn-Smith (arranger) for "Love Theme From A Star Is Born (Evergreen)" performed by Barbra Streisand
- Best Arrangement For Voices
  - The Eagles (arrangers) for "New Kid in Town"

=== Country ===
- Best Country Vocal Performance, Female
  - Crystal Gayle for "Don't It Make My Brown Eyes Blue"
- Best Country Vocal Performance, Male
  - Kenny Rogers for "Lucille"
- Best Country Vocal Performance by a Duo or Group
  - The Kendalls for "Heaven's Just a Sin Away"
- Best Country Instrumental Performance
  - Hargus "Pig" Robbins for Country Instrumentalist of the Year
- Best Country Song
  - Richard Leigh (songwriter) for "Don't It Make My Brown Eyes Blue" performed by Crystal Gayle

=== Folk ===
- Best Ethnic or Traditional Recording
  - Muddy Waters for Hard Again

=== Gospel ===
- Best Gospel Performance, Traditional
  - The Oak Ridge Boys for "Just a Little Talk With Jesus"
- Best Gospel Performance, Contemporary or Inspirational
  - The Imperials for Sail On
- Best Soul Gospel Performance, Traditional
  - James Cleveland for James Cleveland Live at Carnegie Hall
- Best Soul Gospel Performance, Contemporary
  - Edwin Hawkins for Wonderful!
- Best Inspirational Performance
  - B. J. Thomas for Home Where I Belong

=== Jazz ===
- Best Jazz Performance by a Soloist
  - Oscar Peterson for The Giants
- Best Jazz Performance by a Group
  - Phil Woods for The Phil Woods Six - Live From the Showboat
- Best Jazz Performance by a Big Band
  - Count Basie for Prime Time
- Best Jazz Vocal Performance
  - Al Jarreau for Look to the Rainbow

=== Latin ===
- Best Latin Recording
  - Mongo Santamaría for Dawn

=== Musical show ===
- Best Cast Show Album
  - Martin Charnin (composer), Charles Strouse (composer & producer), Larry Morton (producer) & the original cast with Andrea McCardle & Dorothy Loudon for Annie

=== Packaging and notes ===
- Best Album Package
  - John Kosh (art director) for Simple Dreams performed by Linda Ronstadt
- Best Album Notes
  - George T. Simon (notes writer) for Bing Crosby - A Legendary Performer performed by Bing Crosby

=== Pop ===
- Best Pop Vocal Performance, Female
  - Barbra Streisand for "Evergreen (Love Theme From A Star Is Born)"
- Best Pop Vocal Performance, Male
  - James Taylor for "Handy Man"
- Best Pop Performance by a Group
  - Bee Gees for "How Deep Is Your Love"
- Best Pop Instrumental Performance
  - John Williams for Star Wars Soundtrack

=== Production and engineering ===
- Best Engineered Recording, Non-Classical
  - Al Schmitt, Bill Schnee, Elliot Scheiner & Roger Nichols (engineers) for Aja performed by Steely Dan
- Best Engineered Recording, Classical
  - Kenneth Wilkinson (engineer), Georg Solti (conductor) & the Chicago Symphony Orchestra for Maurice Ravel: Bolero
- Producer of the Year
  - Peter Asher

=== R&B ===
- Best R&B Vocal Performance, Female
  - Thelma Houston for "Don't Leave Me This Way"
- Best R&B Vocal Performance, Male
  - Lou Rawls for Unmistakably Lou
- Best R&B Vocal Performance by a Duo, Group or Chorus
  - The Emotions for "Best of My Love"
- Best R&B Instrumental Performance
  - The Brothers Johnson for "Q"
- Best Rhythm & Blues Song
  - Leo Sayer & Vini Poncia (songwriters) for "You Make Me Feel Like Dancing" performed by Leo Sayer

=== Spoken ===
- Best Spoken Word Recording
  - Julie Harris for The Belle of Amherst
