= Can You Feel the Love Tonight =

1994 single by Elton John

Single by Elton John

from the album The Lion King: Original Motion Picture Soundtrack
- B-side: "Hakuna Matata"; "Under the Stars"
- Released: 2 May 1994
- Genre: Pop
- Length: 4:01
- Label: Hollywood; Walt Disney; Mercury
- Composer: Elton John
- Lyricist: Tim Rice
- Producer: Chris Thomas

Elton John singles chronology
"Ain't Nothing Like the Real Thing" (1994)	"Can You Feel the Love Tonight" (1994)	"Circle of Life" (1994)

Music video
- "Can You Feel the Love Tonight" on YouTube

"Can You Feel the Love Tonight" is a song from Disney's 1994 animated feature film The Lion King composed by British musician Elton John with lyrics by Tim Rice. With John's version released as a single in May 1994, by Hollywood, Walt Disney and Mercury Records, the song was a hit in the UK, peaking at number 14 on the UK singles chart, and achieved success in the United States, reaching number four on both the Billboard Hot 100 and Cash Box Top 100. It was a number-one hit in Canada, France and Panama. The accompanying music video was directed by Matthew Amos. At the 67th Academy Awards in March 1995, the song won the Academy Award for Best Original Song. The same year, it also won the Grammy Award for Best Male Pop Vocal Performance. Completing a trifecta, the song also won a Golden Globe at the 52nd Golden Globe Awards held in 1995 for Best Song - Motion Picture.

== Background and release ==
The song, written by Elton John and Tim Rice, was performed in the film by Kristle Edwards (also known as Kristle Murden), Joseph Williams, Sally Dworsky, Nathan Lane, and Ernie Sabella, while another version used in the film's closing credits was performed by John. It won the 1994 Academy Award for Best Original Song, and the Golden Globe Award for Best Original Song. It also earned John the Grammy Award for Best Male Pop Vocal Performance. The single version contains background vocals by Rick Astley, Gary Barlow and Kiki Dee.

It was planned to be sung only by Timon and Pumbaa, but John disliked the comical nature of the concept as he declared that the song was meant to follow "Disney's tradition of great love songs", and that it could "express the lions' feelings for each other far better than dialogue could". The final result was the song mainly sung by an off-screen voice (Edwards) with short lines from Simba (Williams) and Nala (Dworsky), and the beginning and end parts by Timon (Lane) and Pumbaa (Sabella). It also included Zulu vocals that, while mostly muted in the on-screen version, were much more prominently featured in the audio-only releases.

Within around one and a half months before the film was released in June 1994, John's recording was released throughout radio stations as a commercial single and entered the US Billboard Hot 100. The music video of John's recording, directed by Matthew Amos, contains montages of John performing the song and scenes from the film.

In 2003, a remixed version of the song was included in the Special Edition soundtrack of The Lion King, again sung by Elton John. In the follow-up film, The Lion King 1½, the romantic scene where the song was originally featured also had the song playing, but with a difference: interspersed with the romantic scenes were short comedic shots of Timon and Pumbaa trying to disrupt Simba and Nala's night out with the "Peter Gunn Theme" playing while they try.

== Reception ==
The single release of John's recording (the closing credits version) peaked at number one on the US Billboard Adult Contemporary chart for eight weeks. It also sold 500,000+ units in France.

Swedish Aftonbladet complimented "Can You Feel the Love Tonight" as a "really good ballad". AllMusic Heather Phares named it a "Lion King classic". Larry Flick from Billboard magazine wrote, "John's distinctive voice slices through the quasi-orchestral tone of this power ballad. He taps into the song's pensive lyric, giving it a warm, human dimension that would be lost on a lesser performer." Troy J. Augusto from Cash Box commented, "From Hollywood's The Lion King soundtrack comes the always welcome voice of Elton John, who takes a stab at reclaiming his talent for crossover hitmaking with this orchestrated ballad, his most affecting single choice in years." He added, "Moving performance and a heady theme add up to hits radio action as well the usual adult formats and even some classic rock attention. A winner." Howard Reich from Chicago Tribune called it "a swelling romantic ballad", and a proof of that "his songwriting holds echoes of an earlier era." Another Chicago Tribune editor, Michael Wilmington, complimented John as "one of the melodic hook-masters of the modern pop song, noting that when he plays and sings the ballad under the titles in the movie, "it seethes with pop romanticism." David Browne from Entertainment Weekly felt John's croon and piano skills "are aging quite well". EW editor Leah Greenblatt described the song as a "soaring Simba tribute".

Swedish Expressen named it a "typical Elton ballad with echoes of several of his old successes". Fell and Rufer from the Gavin Report said it's "sure-to-be a summer of '94 anthem." Another GR editor, Dave Sholin, complimented it as a "beautiful ballad", adding, "It isn't too early to work on that acceptance speech for next year's Academy Awards, Elton." Alan Jones from Music Week gave it a score of four out of five, calling it "a heavily orchestrated and dead slow ballad" and "one of Elton's more memorable recent melodies." The Network Forty praised it as an "elegant ballad". A reviewer from People Magazine called it "sappy" and "sure to be song of the year". In 2016, David Ehrlich of the Rolling Stone magazine ranked John's performance of the song at the 67th Academy Awards in 1995 at number 12. Paul Jarvey from Telegram & Gazette wrote, "Although it's a simple song about the young cubs Simba and Nala, the tune advances the plot. The two cubs start as playful buddies. A spark of romance flashes when they meet later as full grown lions. The song defines the feelings of the two lions while indicating that changes may be in store for them and other animals in the kingdom." The Staffordshire Sentinel stated that the song "creates the perfect romantic atmosphere".

== Track listing ==
7-inch single, UK (1994)
No.	Title	Length
1.	"Can You Feel the Love Tonight"	3:59
2.	"Can You Feel the Love Tonight" (instrumental)	3:59

CD single, Australia (1994)
No.	Title	Length
1.	"Can You Feel the Love Tonight"	3:59
2.	"Can You Feel the Love Tonight" (instrumental)	3:59
3.	"Hakuna Matata"	3:31
4.	"Under the Stars" (instrumental)	3:43

CD single, US (1994)
No.	Title	Length
1.	"Can You Feel the Love Tonight"	3:59

CD maxi, UK (1994)
No.	Title	Length
1.	"Can You Feel the Love Tonight"	3:59
2.	"Can You Feel the Love Tonight" (instrumental)	3:59
3.	"Hakuna Matata"	3:31
4.	"Under the Stars" (instrumental)	3:43

== Other versions ==
=== Festival of the Lion King ===
In Walt Disney World's Animal Kingdom's Festival of the Lion King, the song is sung by Nakawa and Kibibi. As they sing, two ballet dancers (one male, one female) dressed as birds dance on the stage. After the main chorus is sung, the male bird dancer attaches his partner to a harness that allows her to fly through the air.

=== Disneymania ===
Disneymania is a release series of compilation albums of Disney songs covered by mainstream pop and/or Disney Channel artists singing their own rendition or version of the song. A cover by British pop group S Club was included on the 2002 release of Disneymania. A cover by Sara Paxton was included on the 2006 release of Disneymania 4, A cover by American Idol finalist Elliott Yamin was included on the 2008 release of Disneymania 6.

== Personnel ==
- Elton John – piano, lead vocals
- Davey Johnstone – guitar
- Chuck Sabo – strings, drums
- Phil Spalding – bass
- Guy Babylon – keyboards
- Rick Astley, Gary Barlow, Kiki Dee – backing vocals

== Charts ==
=== Weekly charts ===
Weekly chart performance for "Can You Feel the Love Tonight"
Chart (1994–1995)	Peak position
Australia (ARIA)	9
Austria (Ö3 Austria Top 40)	4
Belgium (Ultratop 50 Flanders)	26
Canada Retail Singles (The Record)	1
Canada Top Singles (RPM)	1
Canada Adult Contemporary (RPM)	1
Europe (Eurochart Hot 100)	4
Europe (European AC Radio)	1
Europe (European Hit Radio)	5
France (SNEP)	1
Germany (GfK)	14
Iceland (Íslenski listinn Topp 40)	13
Ireland (IRMA)	9
Israel (Israeli Singles Chart)	3
Netherlands (Dutch Top 40)	14
Netherlands (Single Top 100)	14
New Zealand (Recorded Music NZ)	7
Norway (VG-lista)	4
Panama (UPI)	1
Scottish Singles Sales (Official Charts)	9
Sweden (Sverigetopplistan)	2
Switzerland (Schweizer Hitparade)	10
UK Singles (Official Charts)	14
UK Airplay (Music Week)	9
US Billboard Hot 100	4
US Adult Contemporary (Billboard)	1
US Pop Airplay (Billboard)	3
US Cash Box Top 100	4

=== Year-end charts ===
1994 year-end chart performance for "Can You Feel the Love Tonight"
Chart (1994)	Position
Australia (ARIA)	28
Brazil (Mais Tocadas)	26
Canada Top Singles (RPM)	3
Canada Adult Contemporary (RPM)	3
Europe (Eurochart Hot 100)	92
Europe (European Hit Radio)	22
France (SNEP)	18
Israel (Israeli Singles Chart)	13
Netherlands (Dutch Top 40)	182
New Zealand (RIANZ)	25
Sweden (Topplistan)	7
UK Singles (OCC)	113
UK Airplay (Music Week)	38
US Billboard Hot 100	18
US Adult Contemporary (Billboard)	9
US Cash Box Top 100	13

1995 year-end chart performance for "Can You Feel the Love Tonight"
Chart (1995)	Position
Austria (Ö3 Austria Top 40)	40
Belgium (Ultratop 50 Wallonia)	87
Europe (Eurochart Hot 100)	35
France (SNEP)	23
Netherlands (Dutch Top 40)	111
Norway (VG-lista) (Winter Period)	6
Sweden (Topplistan)	62

=== Decade-end charts ===
Decade-end chart performance for "Can You Feel the Love Tonight"
Chart (1990–1999)	Position
Canada (Nielsen SoundScan)	13

== Certifications ==
Certifications and sales for "Can You Feel the Love Tonight"
Region	Certification	Certified units/sales
Australia (ARIA)	Gold	35,000^{^}
Austria (IFPI Austria)	Gold	25,000^{*}
Brazil (Pro-Música Brasil) Beyoncé version	Gold	20,000^{‡}
Denmark (IFPI Danmark)	Platinum	90,000^{‡}
France (SNEP)	Gold	250,000^{*}
New Zealand (RMNZ)	Platinum	30,000^{‡}
Sweden (GLF)	Platinum	50,000^{^}
United Kingdom (BPI) Elton John version	Platinum	600,000^{‡}
United Kingdom (BPI) Ernie Sabella/Joseph Williams version	Gold	400,000^{‡}
United States (RIAA)	Platinum	1,000,000
^{*} Sales figures based on certification alone.^{^} Shipments figures based on certification alone.^{‡} Sales+streaming figures based on certification alone.

== Release history ==
Release dates and formats for "Can You Feel the Love Tonight"
Region	Date	Format(s)	Label(s)	Ref.
United States	2 May 1994	Adult contemporary; top 40 radio	Hollywood; Walt Disney	
Japan	25 June 1994	CD	Rocket	
United Kingdom	27 June 1994	7-inch vinyl; CD; cassette	Mercury	
Australia	4 July 1994	CD; cassette	Mercury	

== See also ==
- List of number-one singles of 1994 (Canada)
- List of number-one hits of 1994 (France)
- List of number-one adult contemporary singles of 1994 (U.S.)

== Works cited ==
- Elton John; Bernie Taupin (4 October 1997). "Elton John: 30 Years of Music with Bernie Taupin". Billboard (Interview). Interviewed by Timothy White; Craig Rosen.
