= Jean Johnson (singer) =

American solo and background vocalist

Jean Johnson Witherspoon
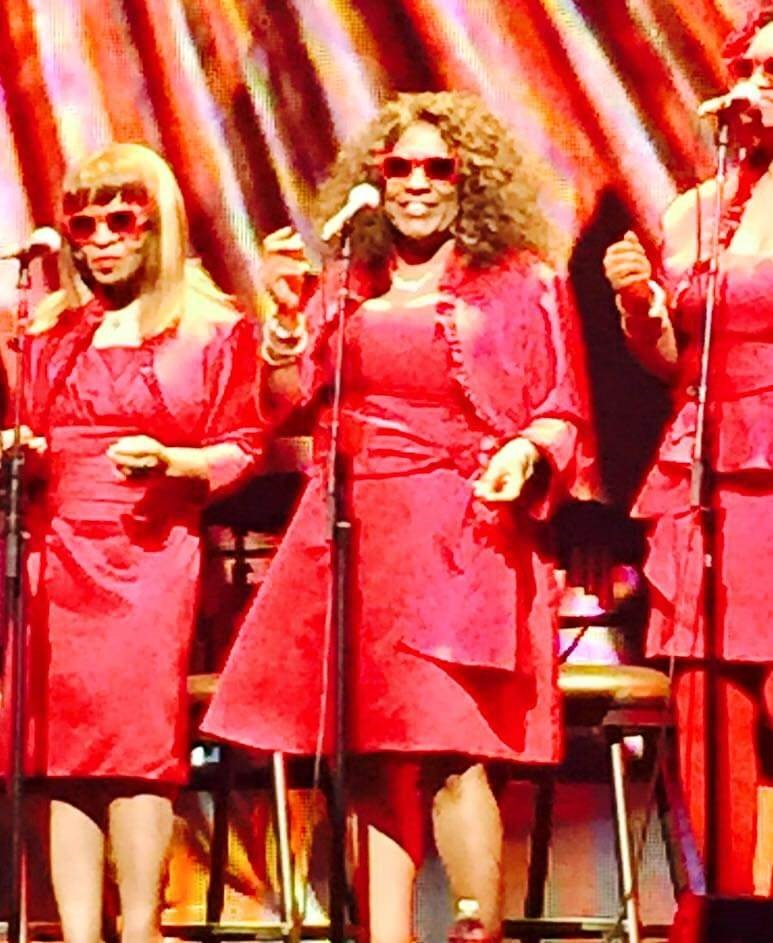

Background information
- Birth name: Jean Johnson
- Origin: Compton, California, U.S.
- Genres: R&B, jazz, gospel
- Occupation(s): CEO, singer, songwriter, record producer, music producer, actress, keyboardist
- Instrument(s): Voice, keyboard
- Years active: 1970's - present

Jean Johnson Witherspoon is an American Grammy nominated solo and background vocalist. Her voice has been used on many historic Grammy Award-winning, gold, and platinum albums, as well as performing live with many artists such as Elton John, Andraé Crouch and Martha Reeves.

== Early life ==
Jean Johnson was born in East Los Angeles, California to the late Pastor John and Veasther Corbin. At an early age she learned how to play the piano and studied at the Walsh Conservatory School of Music. Jean is an ordained and licensed minister with a bachelor's degree in Theology. She landed her first break in the music entertainment industry as one of the Vandellas of Martha and the Vandellas, singing songs like "Jimmy Mack" and "Dancing in the Street."

== Career ==
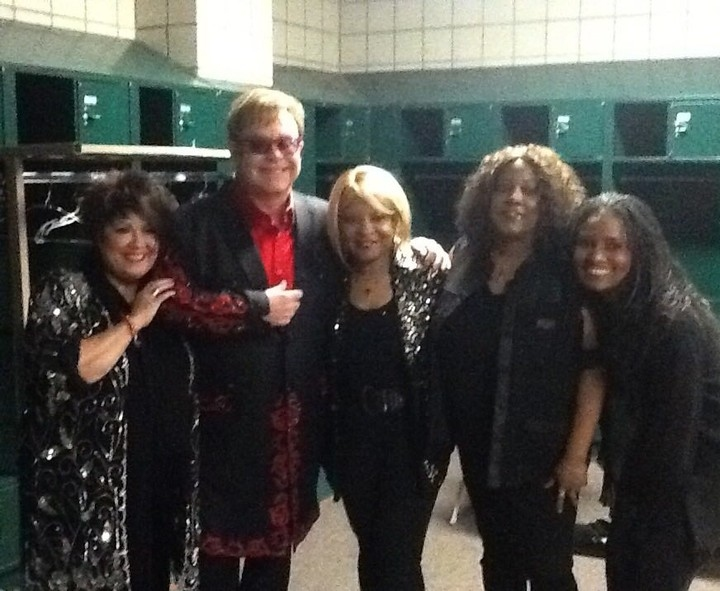
Elton John with his singers Tata Vega, Rose Stone, Jean Johnson Witherspoon, & Lisa Stone

Johnson has performed with leading artists, such as Michael Jackson on the songs "Bad", "Man in the Mirror" "Will You Be There" and “Unbreakable”; Madonna on the song "Like a Prayer"; Quincy Jones on the soundtrack for the film The Color Purple; Stevie Wonder; Julio Iglesias; and Gladys Knight. Soon thereafter, Johnson placed first in the National Dream Girls Contest with Jennifer Holliday and landed a role as the leading vocalist in The Little Shop of Horrors and Date With an Angel. Her big break came when she was asked by Sandra Crouch to perform as the lead vocalist for the singles "He's Worthy", "My Soul Loves Only You" and "Completely Yes". "Completely Yes" earned Johnson her first Grammy nomination, and the work on that album subsequently won the Grammy for Best Soul Gospel Performance, Female.

Johnson is currently the Minister of Music at New Birth Church in Murrietta and has toured with Elton John.
