= Fate (Chaka Khan song) =

Song by Chaka Khan

from the album What Cha' Gonna Do for Me
- Released: April 15, 1981
- Recorded: 1980
- Genre: Post-disco
- Length: 3:14
- Label: Warner Bros.
- Songwriters: Dominic King, Frank Musker
- Producer: Arif Mardin

"Fate" is a song by Dominic King and Frank Musker recorded by Chaka Khan on her 1981 album What Cha' Gonna Do for Me. Despite not being released as a single, "Fate" is often included on disco, post-disco and other compilations such as The Very Best of 100 R&B Classics & 100 Hits Disco. It was also remixed on Chaka Khan's remix album Life Is a Dance: The Remix Project under the title "Fate (David Shaw & Winston Jones Remix)", this version of the song was 5:38, over 2 minutes longer than the original.

== Samples ==
- The instrumental intro to "Fate" has been sampled on many occasions, notably by Stardust in 1998 for their song "Music Sounds Better with You", which reached no. 2 on the UK and no. 1 on the US Billboard Hot Dance Club Play chart.
- "Fate" was also sampled in 2015 by Statik Selektah for his song "Beautiful Life", featuring Action Bronson and Joey Bada$$.
- "Fate" was also sampled in 2014 by Pitbull for his song "Time of Our Lives", featuring Ne-Yo.
