= Grammy Award for Best Soul Gospel Performance, Traditional =

Music award category

The Grammy Award for Best Soul Gospel Performance, Traditional was awarded from 1978 to 1983. A similar award, the Grammy Award for Best Traditional Soul Gospel Album has been awarded since 1991.

Years reflect the year in which the Grammy Awards were presented, for works released in the previous year.

== Recipients ==
Year	Winner(s)	Title	Nominees	Ref.
1978	James Cleveland	James Cleveland Live at Carnegie Hall	Five Blind Boys of Mississippi for I'm Just Another Soldier; Rev. Cleavant Derricks & Family for Satisfaction Guaranteed; Savannah Choir & Rev. Isaac Douglas for Stand Up for Jesus; James Cleveland & the Greater Metropolitan Church of Christ Choir for The Lord Is My Life	
1979	Mighty Clouds of Joy	Live and Direct	Gladys McFadden, Loving Sisters for Amazing Grace; James Cleveland & the Salem Inspirational Choir, Doretha Wade (director) for I Don't Feel Noways Tired; Rev. Isaac Douglas ft. the San Francisco Community Singers, 21st Century Singers for Special Appearance; James Cleveland & the Charles Fold Singers, Charles Fold (director) for Tomorrow	
1980	Mighty Clouds of Joy	Changing Times	Willie Banks & the Messengers for For the Wrong I've Done; James Cleveland & the Southern California Community Choir for It's a New Day; Troy Ramey & the Soul Searchers for Try Jesus	
1981	James Cleveland & the Charles Fold Singers	Lord, Let Me Be an Instrument	James Cleveland & the Voices of Cornerstone for A Praying Spirit; Gospel Keynotes for Ain't No Stopping Us Now; Dorothy Norwood for God Can; O'Neal Twins for He Chose Me; Albertina Walker with James Cleveland for Please Be Patient With Me	
1982	Al Green	The Lord Will Make a Way	Mighty Clouds of Joy for Cloudbust; Daniel Hawkins for Daniel Hawkins; Shirley Caesar for Go; James Cleveland & the Southern California Community Choir for Where Is Your Faith	
1983	Al Green	Precious Lord	Ben Moore for He Believes in Me; Jessy Dixon for Daniel Hawkins; Mighty Clouds of Joy for Miracle Man; Andraé Crouch for We Need to Hear from You	
