= Take Me Back (Andraé Crouch album) =

Studio album by Andraé Crouch and the Disciples
- Released: 1975
- Genre: Jesus music, gospel music
- Label: Light
- Producer: Andraé Crouch and Bill Maxwell

Andraé Crouch and the Disciples chronology
Live at Carnegie Hall	Take Me Back	This Is Another Day

Take Me Back is the sixth album release for Jesus music/gospel music performers Andraé Crouch and the Disciples. The album was digitally remastered and re-released in 2003.

== Accolades ==
Awards and nominations for Take Me Back
Year	Organization	Work	Award	Result	Ref.
1975	Grammy Awards	"Take Me Back"	Best Soul Gospel Performance	Won	

== Track listing ==
All songs written by Andraé Crouch.

=== Side one ===
1. "I'll Still Love You"
2. "Praises"
3. "Just Like He Said He Would"
4. "All I Can Say (I Really Love You)"
5. "You Can Depend On Me"

=== Side two ===
1. "Take Me Back"
2. "The Sweet Love of Jesus"
3. "It Ain't No New Thing"
4. "They Shall Be Mine"
5. "Oh Savior"
6. "Tell Them"

== Personnel ==
Credits adapted from Tidal:

=== Album ===
- Andraé Crouch - production, arrangements, keyboards, organ, percussion, lead vocals, synthesizer
- Bill Maxwell - production, drums, percussion
- Clark Gassman - arrangements
- Larry Muhoberac - arrangements, brass, keyboards, synthesizer
- Fletch Wiley - trumpet, flute, horn and string arrangements
- Conni Treantafeles - art direction, design
- Valerie Behling - art direction, design
- David Hungate - bass
- Wilton Felder - bass
- David T. Walker - guitar
- Dean Parks - guitar
- Fred Tackett - guitar
- Larry Carlton - guitar
- Ernie Watts - horn, saxophone
- Joe Sample - keyboards
- Tom Hensley - keyboards
- Michelle Duffie - marketing consultant
- Billy Preston - organ
- Bill Thedford - percussion, vocals
- Burleigh Drummond - percussion
- Gary Denton - percussion
- Sandra Crouch - percussion, tambourine, vocals
- Bill Grine - photography
- Fred Jackson Jr. - saxophone
- Charles Loper - trombone
- George Bohanon - trombone
- Chuck Findley - trumpet
- Dalton Smith - trumpet
- Mark Underwood - trumpet
- Dannibelle Hall - vocals

=== Digital remaster ===
- Claudius Craig - Compilation Coordinator
- Glenn Meadows - Digital Remastering
- Billy Taylor - Engineering, Mixing
- Chuck Johnson - Engineering
- Tom Trefethen - Engineering, Mixdown Engineering
- Joel Kerr - Mastering
- Michael Granger - Programming

== Charts ==
Singles - Billboard

Year	Single	Chart	Position	Ref
2015	"Take Me Back"	Gospel Digital Song Singles	10	
