= Mercy (Andraé Crouch album) =

Studio album by Andraé Crouch
- Released: 1994
- Studio: The Crouch Factory (Woodland Hills, California); Minds Eye (Temple City, California); O'Henry (Burbank, California); Sounder (Chatsworth, California); Track and Bill Schnee (North Hollywood, California)
- Genre: Gospel, soul, R&B
- Length: 54:56
- Label: Qwest/Warner Bros.
- Producer: Andraé Crouch; Scott V. Smith

Andraé Crouch chronology
No Time to Lose (1984)	Mercy (1994)	Pray (1997)

Mercy is an album by the American musician Andraé Crouch. Released in 1994, it was his first album in 10 years.

The album won a Grammy Award for "Best Pop/Contemporary Gospel Album". It peaked at No. 16 on Billboard's Top Christian Albums chart.

== Production ==
The album was produced by Crouch and Scott V. Smith; it was recorded at Crouch's Woodland Hills home studio. Crouch chose from a pool of around 450 songs that he had written during his break from recording. Quincy Jones, Crouch's label head, took a hands-off approach, allowing Crouch to do whatever he wanted during the recording sessions.

El DeBarge contributed vocals to "The Lord Is My Light". Joe Sample played piano on "Nobody Else Like You".

== Critical reception ==
Professional ratings
Review scores
Source	Rating
AllMusic	3/5 stars
Chicago Sun-Times	4/4 stars
The Encyclopedia of Popular Music	3/5 stars
MusicHound R&B: The Essential Album Guide	5/5 stars
USA Today	3/4 stars

The Dayton Daily News wrote that Crouch "escapes the bounds of his genre while maintaining a spiritually rich, praised-filled album." USA Today stated that "the arrangements, vocals and instrumentation are high-level."

The Philadelphia Inquirer determined that "this is a celebration of styles—from the joyous gospel of 'Give It All Back to Me' to the silky R&B of 'Nobody Else Like You', and the blend of reggae and African rhythms on 'Mercy'." The Virginian-Pilot concluded that, "occasionally, all this star-studded genre-hopping gets to be a bit much." The Chicago Sun-Times thought that the "rich deviations from the more traditional gospel vein are not a dilettante's superfluous musings over more exotic music forms, but rather a convincing display of musical chops, confidence and passion."

AllMusic called the album "a potpourri of musical styles from Caribbean to African, laid down with impeccable taste in arrangement and production." MusicHound R&B: The Essential Album Guide labeled it "a refreshing, triumphant break from contemporary gospel's norm."

== Track listing ==
All tracks are written by Andraé Crouch, except where noted.

No.	Title	Writer(s)	Length
1.	"Say So"		5:43
2.	"Give It All Back to Me"		4:40
3.	"The Lord Is My Light"	Andraé Crouch, Michael Omartian	5:21
4.	"Love Somebody Like Me"		4:34
5.	"Nobody Else Like You"		5:54
6.	"Mercy"		5:52
7.	"This Is the Lord's Doing (Marvelous)"		5:38
8.	"We Love It Here"		5:14
9.	"He's the Light (Of the World)"		4:57
10.	"Mercy Interlude"		0:38
11.	"God Still Loves Me"		6:25
