= Howard McCrary =

American jazz musician

Howard McCrary is an American musician, entertainer, and actor. He was nominated for Grammy Award in 1986 for a gospel record entitled, So Good. He has also been credited for vocal performances and arrangements on the albums of Chaka Khan, Quincy Jones, Michael Jackson, Earth, Wind & Fire, Edwin Hawkins, Kristle Murden, Danniebelle Hall, and many others. He also appears in the first gospel album The Chimes (released in July 2009) of the Chung Brothers (Henry & Roger Chung) in Hong Kong, acting as arranger, pianist and singer in the song "Soul Seranade, Part II".

He guest-starred in the television series Amen, and Martin.

After arriving in Birmingham, England, with the Phil Upchurch Combo on the final date of a UK tour in 1993, McCrary remained in the city for a further year. During this time he performed regularly at the Ronnie Scott's Jazz Club then operating in the city, with one evening's show later released on the Big Bear Records album Moments Like This.

McCrary is the father of actors Darius McCrary and Donovan McCrary.
