= Take the Message Everywhere =

Studio album by Andraé Crouch and the Disciples
- Released: 1968
- Genre: Jesus music, gospel music
- Label: Light
- Producer: Ralph Carmichael

Andraé Crouch and the Disciples chronology
| The COGICS | Take the Message Everywhere | Soulfully |

Take the Message Everywhere (1968) is the debut album release for Jesus music/gospel music performers Andraé Crouch and the Disciples.

== Track listing ==
All tracks composed by Andraé Crouch; except where noted.

=== Side one ===
1. "He Never Sleeps" (Traditional; arranged by Andraé Crouch) - 2:25
2. "Everywhere" - 2:00
3. "The Broken Vessel" - 2:32
4. "I've Got It" - 2:20
5. "Without a Song" (Billy Rose, Edward Eliscu, Vincent Youmans) - 2:45

=== Side two ===
1. "No, Not One" - 2:20
2. "I'll Never Forget" - 2:29
3. "The Blood Will Never Lose Its Power" - 2:58
4. "Wade in the Water" - 2:05
5. "What Makes a Man Turn His Back on God?" - 2:23
6. "Precious Lord, Take My Hand" (Thomas A. Dorsey) - 2:07
