= Annie (original Broadway cast recording) =

Cast recording by the original Broadway cast
- Released: 1977
- Recorded: 1977
- Genre: Show tunes
- Label: Columbia Masterworks

Professional ratings
Review scores
Source	Rating
AllMusic	4.5/5 stars

Annie is an album containing the original studio cast recording of the 1977 Broadway musical Annie. The album was released in the same year on Columbia Records.

== Chart performance and sales ==
The album peaked at number 81 on the U.S. Billboard Top LPs & Tape chart. It was certified Platinum by the RIAA.

According to Billboard, it was the first ever album to be certified Platinum by the RIAA. (Given that the 1971 album Jesus Christ Superstar was released before the Platinum certification was incepted.)

== Track listing ==
LP (Columbia Masterworks JS 34712)

Side 1
No.	Title	Artist(s)	Length
1.	"Overture"		3:20
2.	"Maybe"	McArdle, orphans	2:36
3.	"The Hard-Knock Life"	McArdle, orphans	2:20
4.	"Tomorrow"	McArdle	2:05
5.	"We'd Like to Thank You Herbert Hoover"	Hooverville-ites	2:25
6.	"Little Girls"	Loudon	2:42
7.	"I Think I'm Gonna Like It Here"	Faison, McArdle, servants	2:21
8.	"N.Y.C."	Shelton, Faison, McArdle, orphans	4:49

Side 2
No.	Title	Artist(s)	Length
1.	"Easy Street"	Loudon, Fitch, Erwin	3:21
2.	"You Won't Be an Orphan for Long"	Faison, servants	1:42
3.	"You're Never Fully Dressed Without a Smile"	Craig, Beechman, Cowan, Worth, orphans	3:12
4.	"Tomorrow" (Reprise)	McArdle, Thorne, Shelton, cabinet	2:20
5.	"Something Was Missing"	Shelton	3:40
6.	"I Don't Need Anything but You"	Shelton, McArdle, Faison, guests	2:27
7.	"Annie"	Faison, servants	1:32
8.	"A New Deal for Christmas"	McArdle, Shelton, Faison, Thorne, servants, orphans	2:10

== Charts ==
Chart (1977)	Peak position
US Billboard LPs & Tape	81

== Certifications ==
Region	Certification	Certified units/sales
United States (RIAA)	Platinum	1,000,000^{^}
^{^} Shipments figures based on certification alone.

== Awards ==
Year	Award type	Categories	Results	Ref.
1978	Grammy Awards	Best Score from an Original Cast Show Album	Won	
