= Gilley's Urban Cowboy Band =

Gilley's Urban Cowboy Band is Mickey Gilley's band, featured in the movie Urban Cowboy. In 1981 The Urban Cowboy Band won its first and only Grammy for "Best Country Instrumental Performance". The band also received the Academy of Country Music's "Band of the Year Award".

The original Urban Cowboy Band at Gilley's consisted of Gilley; Johnny Lee; Bobbe Brown, drums, bass, and guitar; Tabby Crabb, piano and guitar; Rocky Stone, guitar; Damon Stephens, lead guitar and keyboards; Ron Levine, fiddle, piano, and band leader; Sidney Pomonis, bass and bus driver; J. B. Van, pedal steel guitar; Mike Schillaci, drums; Norman Carlson, saxophone, keyboards.

In 1990, Gilley and his Urban Cowboy Band opened the Mickey Gilley Theatre in Branson, Missouri. Mickey teamed back up with Johnny Lee for The Urban Cowboy Reunion Tour.

Crabb died April 18, 2011. Gilley died May 7, 2022, of complications from bone cancer.
