= What Cha' Gonna Do for Me =

Studio album by Chaka Khan
- Released: April 15, 1981
- Recorded: 1980
- Genre: Funk; soul; jazz
- Length: 42:04
- Label: Warner Bros.
- Producer: Arif Mardin

Chaka Khan chronology
| Naughty (1980) | What Cha' Gonna Do for Me (1981) | Camouflage (with Rufus) (1981) |

Singles from What Cha' Gonna Do for Me
- 1. "What Cha' Gonna Do for Me" Released: February 1981 (US) [#WBS 49692] June 1981 (UK) [#K17821]; 2. "We Can Work It Out" Released: June 1981 [#WBS 49759]; 3. "Any Old Sunday" Released: August 1981 [#WBS 49804]; 4. "I Know You, I Live You" Released: November 1981 [#WBS 49847]; 5. "Heed The Warning" Released: April 1981 (UK Only) [#K17793]

Professional ratings
Review scores
| Source | Rating |
|---|---|
| AllMusic | 4/5 stars |
| Robert Christgau | B− |
| The Rolling Stone Album Guide | 3/5 stars |
| Rolling Stone | 2/5 stars |

What Cha' Gonna Do for Me is the third solo album by American R&B/funk singer Chaka Khan, released on Warner Bros. Records in 1981. It was certified gold by the RIAA.

== Overview ==
Teaming again with Arif Mardin, slowly but surely the two began to craft an even more successful and innovative sound. This effort not only bests the work before it, but it is Mardin's most fulfilling production since 1974's Average White Band.

— Jason Elias, Allmusic

Three singles were released from What Cha' Gonna Do: the Beatles cover "We Can Work It Out" (US R&B #34), the McCrarys cover "Any Old Sunday" (#68) and the album's title track which became a number one hit on Billboard R&B Singles chart. On Billboard's charts, the album reached #3 on Black Albums, #33 on Jazz Albums, and #17 on Pop Albums. This would be Chaka's highest-charting album until her 1980s-era breakthrough I Feel For You. Its popularity among jazz audiences was likely due to the inclusion of the Dizzy Gillespie composition "Night In Tunisia" with a guest appearance by Gillespie himself as well as what today would be called a 'sample' of Charlie Parker's legendary four bar alto break from his 1946 recording of the title. Khan's vocal interpretation also features lyrics written by the singer herself. This album was nominated for Best R&B Vocal Performance, Female in 1981.

The instrumental intro to "Fate" has been sampled by a host of dance acts all through the 1990s and 2000s, most notably by Stardust on their 1998 hit single "Music Sounds Better With You" and a section of "I Know You I Live You" also features on "Bad Habit" by ATFC & Onephatdeeva feat. Lisa Milett.

=== Reissues ===
What Cha' Gonna Do For Me has only been re-issued on CD in both Europe and Japan. The album has yet to see a CD release in the United States, but did become domestically available digitally shortly after Khan won multiple Grammys for her 2007 album Funk This.

In 2016, Big Break Records re-issued the album as an expanded edition with special liner notes, rare photos, and containing three bonus tracks: "Only Once", "Lover's Touch" and "I Know You, I Live You (Remix)". Though the remix of "I Know You, I Live You" was previously released on Life Is a Dance: The Remix Project, the other two were only available on 7" singles until the Big Break reissue. "Lover's Touch" was the B-Side of "What Cha' Gonna Do For Me" in the US, and "Only Once" was the B-Side of "We Can Work It Out."

== Commercial performance ==
What Cha' Gonna Do for Me debuted at number 80 on the US Billboard 200 during the week of May 9, 1981. The album would eventually peak at number 17 on the week of June 20, 1981. The album also peaked at number 3 on Billboard's Top R&B/Hip-Hop Albums chart during the week of June 13, 1981. On July 1, 1981, What Cha' Gonna Do for Me was certified Gold by the Recording Industry Association of America (RIAA).

== Track listing ==
| No. | Title | Writer(s) | Length |
|---|---|---|---|
| 1. | "We Can Work It Out" | John Lennon, Paul McCartney | 3:43 |
| 2. | "What Cha' Gonna Do for Me" | Ned Doheny, Hamish Stuart | 3:54 |
| 3. | "I Know You, I Live You" | Chaka Khan, Arif Mardin | 4:29 |
| 4. | "Any Old Sunday" | Linda McCrary, Alfred McCrary | 3:37 |
| 5. | "We Got Each Other" | Alan Baboff, Chaka Khan, Fred Lederman | 3:56 |
| 6. | "And the Melody Still Lingers On (Night in Tunisia)" | Chaka Khan, Arif Mardin, Dizzy Gillespie, Frank Paparelli | 5:04 |
| 7. | "Night Moods" | Jerry Ragovoy | 4:21 |
| 8. | "Heed the Warning" | Ellison Chase, Arthur Jacobson, Chaka Khan, Mark Stevens | 4:32 |
| 9. | "Father He Said" | Deborah Ash, Mike Campagna | 3:52 |
| 10. | "Fate" | Dominic Bugatti, Frank Musker | 3:14 |
| 11. | "I Know You, I Live You" (Reprise) | Chaka Khan, Arif Mardin | 1:22 |

== Personnel ==
- Chaka Khan – vocals, background vocals
- Steve Ferrone – drums all tracks except 1, 6
- Anthony Jackson – bass all tracks except 1, 6
- David Williams – guitar all tracks except 1, 6
- Hamish Stuart – guitar all tracks except 1, 6
- Larry Williams – keyboards, flute, saxophone, synthesizer all tracks except 1, 6

Track 1: “We Can Work It Out”
Drums - Ray Pounds
Keyboards [All], Synthesizer [Mini Moog Bass] - Greg Phillinganes
Guitar – Mike Sembello
Percussion – Paulinho da Costa
Horn Arrangement – Larry Williams
Horns [Brass, Reeds] – Bill Reichenbach, Gary Grant, Kim Hutchcroft, Larry Hall, Larry Williams
Arranged by [String Arrangement] – Arif Mardin
Concert Master - Gene Orloff

Track 2: “What Cha’ Gonna Do For Me”
Synthesizer – Bob Christianson
Percussion – Crusher Bennett
Tenor Saxophone [Tenor Sax Solo], Soloist – Michael Brecker
Arranged by [Horn Arrangement] – Arif Mardin
Horns [Brass, Reeds] – Barry Rogers, Lou Delgatto, Lou Soloff, Michael Brecker, Randy Brecker

Track 3, 10: “I Know You, I Live You”
Percussion – Crusher Bennett, Chaka Khan
Arranged by [Horn Arrangement], Saxophone – Larry Williams
Trumpet – Jerry Hey

Track 4: “Any Old Sunday”
Flugelhorn – Randy Brecker

Track 5: “We Got Each Other”
Vocals [Duet Vocal] – Mark Stevens
Arranged by [Horn Arrangement], Saxophone – Larry Williams
Trumpet – Jerry Hey

Track 6: “And The Melody Still Lingers On (Night In Tunisia)”
Drums – Casey Scheuerell
Bass – Abraham Laboriel
Electric Piano – Ronnie Foster
Keyboards [Clavitar Solo, Break], Synthesizer [Oberheim Bells] – Herbie Hancock
Percussion – Paulinho da Costa
Synthesizer [Mini Moog Bass, Prophet 5] – David Foster
Trumpet – Dizzy Gillespie

Track 7: "Night Moods"
Arranged by [String Arrangement] – Arif Mardin
Concert Master - Gene Orloff

Track 8: “Heed The Warning”
Synthesizer [Moog Synthesizer], Soloist [Solo] – David Richards

Track 9: “Fate”
Clavinet – Richard Tee
Guitar [Guitar Solo], Soloist – Hiram Bullock
Percussion – Crusher Bennett
Synthesizer – David Richards

== Non-album tracks ==
- "Lover's Touch" — B-side of single "What Cha' Gonna Do For Me" (WBS 49692) (Taylor) - 4:31
- "Only Once" — B-side of single "We Can Work It Out" (WBS 49759) (Ruff, Ruff, Kaplan) - 3:55

== Charts ==
=== Weekly charts ===
| Chart (1981) | Peak position |
|---|---|
| New Zealand Albums (RMNZ) | 42 |
| US Billboard 200 | 17 |
| US Top R&B/Hip-Hop Albums (Billboard) | 3 |
| US Top Jazz Albums (Billboard) | 35 |

=== Year-end charts ===
| Chart (1981) | Position |
|---|---|
| US Top R&B/Hip-Hop Albums (Billboard) | 36 |

== Certifications ==
| Region | Certification | Certified units/sales |
|---|---|---|
| United States (RIAA) | Gold | 500,000^{^} |
^{^} Shipments figures based on certification alone.
