= Danniebelle Hall =

American gospel musician (1938–2000)

Danniebelle Hall (October 6, 1938 – December 28, 2000), was an American gospel musician, recording artist, songwriter.

== Biography ==
=== Early life ===
Danniebelle Hall was born in Pittsburgh, Pennsylvania the fourth of eight children. She was born to William Butler Jones and Danniebell Jones. Danniebelle learned to play piano at the age of three. She played piano for her hometown church. To advance her passion for spreading the gospel through song, she enlisted the talents of her two younger sisters and formed the trio, The Jones Sisters. She moved to San Francisco, California, when she was 17 years old, where she met and married Charles E. Hall. They had three children Charlotte, Charles and Cynthia.

=== Musical career ===
In 1969, she formed a group called The Danniebelles. The group went on tour overseas. This promoted the growth and the popularity of The Danniebelles beyond expectations. They were able to record an album and minister to thousands while touring with World Vision International in Zamboanga, Mindanao, Philippines, and Phnom Penh, Cambodia. World Crusade Ministries.

A few years later, Danniebelle joined the gospel group of Andraé Crouch and the Disciples. She was featured on such classic Gospel recordings as "Take Me Back" and "Soon and Very Soon."

Danniebelle sang and recorded several solo albums that spanned the next 2 and a half decades. She has traveled worldwide. Using her own personal trials as an example, she spread the love of Jesus Christ. Although she composed and arranged music, she found great fulfillment in being a lyricist. She is admired for having set biblical passages to music. She also penned the popular Gospel song, "Ordinary People," which is included on her 1977 recording, "Let Me Have A Dream" and was also recorded by James Cleveland and the Salem Inspirational Choir in 1978.

== Personal life ==
Being an insulin dependent diabetic for a number of years, she was also under treatment for hypertension. She survived a mastectomy due to breast cancer, left leg amputation below the knee, and a host of other health related issues.

She died on December 28, 2000.

== Discography ==
=== Albums ===
- Danniebelle (Light, 1974)
- This Moment (Light, 1975)
- He Is King (Light, 1976)
- Let Me Have a Dream (Sparrow, 1977)
- Danniebelle Live in Sweden with Choralerna (Sparrow, 1978)
- Unmistakably Danniebelle (Onyx International, 1983)
- Song of the Angels (Onyx International, 1983)
- Designer's Original (CGI, 1992)
- The Best Gets Better (CGI, 1995)
- Remembering the Times (EMI, 2001)
