= Mighty Wind =

Studio album by Andrae Crouch and the Disciples
- Released: 2006
- Genre: Gospel music
- Label: Verity

Andrae Crouch and the Disciples chronology
Gift of Christmas	Mighty Wind

Professional ratings
Review scores
Source	Rating
Christianity Today	

Mighty Wind is a live album that was released to celebrate gospel musician Andrae Crouch's 40th year of recording gospel music. Crouch was able to get many well-known gospel singers to guest star on the project including Marvin Winans ("All Because of Jesus"), Karen Clark-Sheard ("Jesus Is Lord"), Fred Hammond ("Oh Give Thanks") and Crystal Lewis ("We Give You Glory").

== Track listing ==
1. "I Was Glad"
2. "I Was Glad (reprise)"
3. "All Because of Jesus"
4. "All Because of Jesus (reprise)"
5. "Jesus is Lord"
6. "Bless the Lord"
7. "Bless the Lord (reprise)"
8. "O Give Thanks"
9. "We Give You Glory"
10. "Come Home"
11. "Holy"
12. "Thank You for Everything"
13. "Yes Lord"
14. "Mighty Wind"

== Awards ==
In 2007, the album won a Dove Award for Traditional Gospel Album of the Year at the 38th GMA Dove Awards.
