= Myrna Summers =

- Born: 30 March 1949 (age 77); Washington, D.C., United States
- Origin: Washington, DC
- Genres: Gospel
- Years active: 1970 - present

Myrna Summers (born March 30, 1949) is a gospel music singer who has performed professionally for over four decades and is still on fire for the Lord. She has a commanding yet distinctive alto voice.

== Biography ==
Summers was born in Washington D.C. in 1949. Her parents were members of the Church of God in Christ (COGIC), and she performed in services at the Refreshing Spring Church in Riverdale, Maryland from a very early age. She attended the McKinley Tech High School, and went on to the University of Maryland and the Toutorsky Academy of Music.

She formed a group the Refreshingnettes in the early 1960s. The group recorded "Pray Your Troubles / I'm Determined" for HOB Records. Her original compositions "God Gave Me a Song" (1970) and "Give Me Something to Hold on To" (1979) earned her Grammy Award nominations. She was the 1970 recipient of the Gospel Music Workshop of America's Mahalia Jackson Award. Her album entitled "We Going To Make It" became one of her best selling recordings in June 1988 and won a 1989 Stellar Award for Best Traditional Gospel Artist (Female). She is known for her collaborations with Timothy Wright, the Dallas Fort-Worth Mass Choir and Ambassadors for Christ.

She has performed at Madison Square Garden, the Apollo Theater and the Lincoln Center in New York and at the Kennedy Center in Washington, D.C. Summers was Minister of Music at Refreshing Spring COGIC before joining Reid Temple A.M.E Church in 1999. As Minister of Music at Reid Temple she is the leader of the church's five choirs and orchestra, and the Director of the Mass Choir. The choir led by Summers provides a stirring accompaniment to the preaching and prayers at the megachurch.

== Discography ==
Myrna Summers has recorded on more than 50 albums. A select list follows.

Year	Title	Label	Notes
1970	God Gave Me a Song	Cotillion / Atlantic	Single, Grammy Nomination
1972	Tell It Like It Is	Cotillion	
1972	Now	Cotillion	
1975	Myrna Summers & The Myrna Summers Singers	Savoy	
1976	I Found Jesus (and I'm Glad)	Savoy	
1977	Myrna Summers	Savoy	
1978	I'll Keep Holding On	Savoy	
1979	Give Me Something to Hold On To	Savoy	Grammy nominated, Recorded Live at Women's Correctional Facility in WV
1980	Life Is Fragile: Handle With Prayer	Savoy	
1982	Uncloudy Day	Savoy	
1985	Here Comes The Son	Savoy	
1988	We're Going to Make It	Savoy	Guest artist Rev. Timothy Wright. Stellar award
1990	I'll Keep Holding on	Savoy	Live recording
1990	You Are My Miracle		
1990	You Don't Have Nothing If You Don't Have Jesus		
1991	I'll Tell the World	Savoy	
1993	Deliverance	Savoy	
2000	His Mercy Endureth Forever	PGF records	
2006	Mountain Get Out of My Way		with the Reid Temple A.M.E. Mass Choir
