= I'll Be Thinking of You =

Studio album by Andraé Crouch
- Released: 1979
- Studio: Hollywood Sound Recorders, Hollywood, California. Paramount Recording, Hollywood, California. The Sound Labs, Hollywood, California. United Western Studios, Hollywood, California.
- Genre: Gospel, R&B
- Length: 40:32
- Label: Elektra, Light
- Producer: Andraé Crouch, Bill Maxwell

Andraé Crouch chronology
Just Andrae (1973)	I'll Be Thinking of You (1979)	More of the Best... (1981)

I'll Be Thinking of You is a 1979 album by Andraé Crouch, released on the Elektra and Light record labels. The album won a Grammy Award for Best Contemporary Soul Gospel Album.

Artists such as Stevie Wonder and Philip Bailey appeared on the album.

== Critical reception ==
Professional ratings
Review scores
Source	Rating
AllMusic	3/5 stars

The Manchester Evening News wrote that "the way the guy whips up a storm, the phrasing and the ability to handle the slow to up-beat gospel and R and B make it a goodie."

== Track listing ==
Side one
No.	Title	Writer(s)	Length
1.	"I'll Be Thinking of You"	Andraé Crouch	5:10
2.	"I've Got the Best"	Andrae Crouch	4:54
3.	"Touch Me"	Andrae Crouch	5:34
4.	"Lookin' for You"	Andrae Crouch	4:48

Side two
No.	Title	Writer(s)	Length
5.	"Bringin' Back the Sunshine"	Andrae Crouch	4:16
6.	"Jesus Is Lord"	Andrae Crouch, Rev. Patrick Henderson	5:52
7.	"The Love Medley: There's No Hatred/Let The Same Spirit/There's No Hatred (Reprise)"	Andraé Crouch	7:14
8.	"Dreamin'"	Andraé Crouch	3:05

== Personnel ==
Musicians

- Dorothy Ashby – harp
- Philip Bailey – vocals, background vocals, soloist
- Bea Carr – background vocals
- Larry Carlton - guitar
- Lenny Castro - percussion
- Andraé Crouch – keyboards, marimba, vocals, background vocals, soloist
- Sandra Crouch – percussion, background Vocals
- Marvin "Tuffy" Cummings – background vocals
- Mike Escalante - synthesizer
- James Felix – background vocals
- Tommy Funderburk – background vocals
- Tammie Gibson – background vocals
- Jay Graydon – guitar
- Danniebelle Hall – vocals, soloist
- Kathy Hazzard – background vocals
- Rev. Patrick Henderson – keyboards
- Hadley Hockensmith – bass, guitar, soloist
- David Hungate – bass
- Abraham Laboriel – bass
- Bill Maxwell – drums, percussion
- Marty McCall – background vocals
- Dorothy Ashby – background vocals
- Alfred McCrary – background vocals
- Charity McCrary – trumpet
- Howard McCrary – keyboards, background vocals, synthesizer bass
- Linda McCrary – background vocals
- David Miner – bass
- Perry Morgan – background vocals
- Kristle Murden – vocals, background vocals, soloist
- Glen Myerscough – saxophone
- Kenneth Nash – percussion
- Michael Omartian – keyboards
- Lance Ong – synthesizer
- Dean Parks – guitar
- Billy Preston – keyboards
- Harlan Rogers – keyboards, arrangements
- Phyllis St. James – background vocals
- Joe Sample – keyboards
- David Shields – bass
- Leland Sklar – bass
- Howard Smith – vocals, background vocals, soloist
- Steve Tavaglione – saxophone
- Rodney Wayne – background vocals
- David Williams – guitar
- Stevie Wonder – harmonica

Production

- Andraé Crouch – Arranger, Producer, Vocal Arrangement, Mixing
- Bob Cotton – Engineer, Mixing
- John Guess – Engineer
- Peter Haden – Assistant Engineer
- Al Schmidt Jr – Assistant Engineer
- Bill Maxwell – Producer, Vocal Arrangement, Mixing
- Howard McCrary – Vocal Arrangement
- Glenn Meadows – Digital Mastering, Reissue Mastering
- Glen Myerscough – Horn Arrangements
- Ross Pallone – Assistant Engineer
- Ken Perry – Mastering
- Harlan Rogers – Arranger
- Gordon Shryock – Engineer, Mixing
- Lennart Sjöholm – String Arrangements

== Charts ==
Chart performance for I'll Be Thinking of You
Chart (1980)	Peak position
US Top Soul LPs (Billboard)	46
