= Jessy Dixon =

American singer

- Born: March 12, 1938; San Antonio, Texas, U.S.
- Origin: Chicago, Illinois
- Died: September 26, 2011 (aged 73) Chicago, Illinois
- Genres: Gospel, contemporary Christian music, R&B
- Instruments: Vocals, piano
- Years active: 1960s–2011
- Label: Ambassador

Jessy Dixon (March 12, 1938 – September 26, 2011) was an American gospel music singer, songwriter, and pianist, with success among audiences across racial lines. He garnered seven Grammy Award nominations during his career.

He worked with a variety of musicians, including Paul Simon, Andrae Crouch, DeGarmo & Key and Bill and Gloria Gaither. He wrote songs for Amy Grant, Natalie Cole, Cher, and Diana Ross.

Dixon was an ordained minister with Calvary Ministries International of Fort Wayne, Indiana.

== Biography ==
Born in San Antonio, Texas, Dixon sang and played his first song at the age of five. As a youngster he moved to Chicago, where he was discovered by James Cleveland, one of the first artists to sing and record Dixon's compositions "God Can Do Anything But Fail" and "My God Can Make A Way." The organizers of the Newport Jazz Festival invited him to perform his new song "The Wicked Shall Cease Their Troubling, at New York's Radio City Music Hall in 1972. After the performance, Dixon and The Jessy Dixon Singers were requested to do four encores. Paul Simon (of Simon & Garfunkel fame), was in the audience and invited Dixon to share the stage with him as lead vocalist on NBC-TV's Saturday Night Live.

Dixon found himself touring with Simon across the U.S., France, Canada, Scandinavia, Israel, and Japan. Dixon's affiliation with Simon lasted eight years, during which time he recorded two albums, Paul Simon in Concert: Live Rhymin' (1974) and Still Crazy After All These Years (1975), both of which sold a million copies. A later collaboration with Simon took place for "Wartime Prayers," a song that appeared on Paul Simon's 2006 Surprise album.

Bill and Gloria Gaither invited him to sing at a Homecoming video taping. Dixon was a favorite on the series, and has traveled all over the United States and abroad surprising gospel audiences with his stirring performances of "It's A Highway To Heaven," "Operator", "Leaving On My Mind," "Blood Bought Church," "The Wicked Shall Cease Their Troubling," "Lord Prepare Me To Be A Sanctuary," and "I Am Redeemed." Dixon performed in the show Black Nativity with the Jessy Dixon Theater Group.

== Death ==
Dixon was diagnosed with cancer in 2010. Dixon died on September 26, 2011, at his home in Chicago, aged 73.
