= Sandra Crouch =

American musician (1942–2024)

Background information
- Born: Sandra Elaine Crouch; July 1, 1942; Los Angeles, California, U.S.
- Died: March 17, 2024 (aged 81) Los Angeles, California
- Genres: Christian, gospel, soul, pop, R&B
- Occupations: Musician, songwriter, pastor
- Instruments: Vocals, drums, percussion
- Years active: c. 1960–2024
- Labels: Light, Sparrow

Sandra Elaine Crouch (July 1, 1942 – March 17, 2024) was an American gospel music performer, drummer, songwriter and pastor.

== Musical career ==
Crouch won a Grammy Award in 1984 in the category Best Soul Gospel Performance, Female for her 1983 album We Sing Praises. She was nominated for a Grammy in 1986 in the category Best Soul Gospel Performance, Duo, Group, Chorus or Choir (co-nominee Jean Johnson) for the song "Completely Yes" from her 1985 album We're Waiting. Her 1992 album With All of My Heart was nominated for a Grammy award in the category Best Gospel Album by a Choir or Chorus. She won two GMA Dove Awards from the Gospel Music Association for her 1983 and 1992 albums.

Her early works, starting around 1960, include songwriting and performing alongside her twin brother Andraé Crouch in the gospel group The COGICS and later in Andraé Crouch & The Disciples. During the late 1960s through the early 1970s, she played the tambourine on a number of Motown recording sessions in Los Angeles, including the Jackson 5 hits "I Want You Back" and "ABC". Her session credits include recordings with Neil Diamond and Janis Joplin.

== Personal life ==
Sandra Crouch was born on July 1, 1942, in Los Angeles, California, along with her twin brother Andraé. Until his death in January 2015, she and her brother were co-pastors at the New Christ Memorial Church of God in Christ in Pacoima, California. On the day of her brother's death, Crouch released the following statement: "Today my twin brother, womb-mate and best friend went home to be with the Lord. Please keep me, my family and our church family in your prayers. I tried to keep him here but God loved him best." After her brother passed, she continued her work as senior pastor.

Crouch died on March 17, 2024, at the age of 81.

== Discography ==
- We Sing Praises (1983), Grammy winner
- We're Waiting (1985)
- "Completely Yes" (1985), Grammy nominee
- With All of My Heart (1992), Grammy nominee
- Gospel Legacy (2008)

With Lalo Schifrin

- Rock Requiem (1971)

With The Fearless Flyers

- "Barbara" (2018)
- "Signed, Sealed, Delivered" (2018)
