= Kristle Murden =

American singer-songwriter (born 1956)

- Also known as: Kristle Edwards
- Born: December 9, 1956 (age 69); Newark, New Jersey
- Origin: United States
- Genre: Soul Black Gospel
- Occupations: Singer-songwriter, musician, music producer, vocal coach, author and ordained minister
- Label: Light Records

Kristle Murden (born December 9, 1956), also known as Kristle Edwards, is an American singer-songwriter, musician, music producer, author and ordained minister. Murden is the soloist on the song "Can You Feel the Love Tonight" from The Lion King. She made her professional debut in 1979 singing the duet "I'll Be Thinking of You" with Andraé Crouch, for which Stevie Wonder played harmonica. She signed as a solo artist with Light Records, also in 1979. She was nominated for two Grammy awards: her solo album I Can't Let Go was nominated in 1980, and in 1984, she was nominated for her solo vocal performance for "Jesus Come Lay Your Head on Me" from Andraé Crouch's No Time to Lose album. In 1981 she was nominated for a Dove Award for her I Can't Let Go album in the category of Best Soul Black Gospel album.

In 1982 Murden earned the Best New Artist Contemporary Award at The Gospel Music Excellence Awards at the annual Gospel Music Workshop of America. She has worked on over 30 film soundtracks, television shows, and major artists' albums as either a featured or backing vocalist. In 2019, Murden published her autobiography titled It Took a Miracle and Then Some.

== Early life ==
Murden was born December 9, 1956, in Newark, New Jersey. She was the 5th child of Doris B. Legges and Charles H. Murden. At the age of three her family moved to Washington D.C. where she attended West Elementary school, Paul Junior High, Calvin Coolidge High School and McKinley Tech High School. She began singing at 4 years old in the youth choir at the First Baptist Church of Annapolis, Maryland. She taught herself to read music and to play the piano at age ten. She began writing songs a year later.

After a troubled childhood, she became a foster child at 15 years old.

== Career ==
As a vocalist, Murden has traveled to over thirty countries singing with Crouch. She has performed in Jamaica, Israel, Finland, Sweden, Norway, (Germany), the Netherlands, Denmark, Japan, Fiji, Australia, England, Canada, France, Ireland, St. Thomas and St. Martin and New Zealand. She sang on several more of Crouch's albums.

Murden performed another duet with Crouch on the "No Time To Lose" album titled "Somebody Somewhere Is Praying" and performed her solo "Jesus Come Lay your Head on Me" on the same album released in 1984. In 1993 they came together again to record two more duets, "He is The Light" and "Say So" on Crouch's "Mercy" album released in 1994. Murden performed one more duet with Crouch on his 1996 album "Pray" "It's Just A Matter of Time" and another featured solo on "Come Closer". In 1997, she appeared with Crouch on the "Oslo Gospel Choir -Live in Paris " recording. She shared leads with Crouch on "Perfect Peace", "Soon and Very Soon", and My Tribute" on that project. In 1999, Murden and Crouch performed on "Angels Medley" for his "The Gift of Christmas" album. In October 2000 Murden was featured on "The Great Choirs of America" album on the song, "Do You Need a Miracle". Between these recordings she worked as a studio singer on projects for artists such as Barbra Streisand, Michael Jackson, Celine Dion, Whitney Houston, Josh Groban, Ledisi, Clay Aiken, Brandy, Israel Houghton,Christina Aguilera, The Winans, Ronan Keating, CeCe Winans, Disney Greatest Love Songs, Ladies of Gospel, and many more major recording artists. Murden has also worked as an onscreen singer for several television shows. "Mike and Molly", "The Middle", "The Jamie Fox Show", "The Tonight Show", "The Grammy Awards", "Touched by an Angel", "General Hospital", "The Soul Train Music Awards", "The Arsenio Hall Show", and more. She has contributed vocally on movie soundtracks such as "The Lady Killers", where she is featured during the credits, "The Preachers Wife" "The Haunted Mansion" "This is It", "Rent", A Time to Kill, and "Voyage of the Unicorn", to name a few.

== Personal life ==
Murden moved to Tacoma, Washington in December 1978 to take the position of Music Minister for Edwards Temple Church of God in Christ. In August 1979 Kristle signed a record deal with Light Records.
