= Andraé Crouch =

American gospel singer, songwriter, and choir leader (1942–2015)

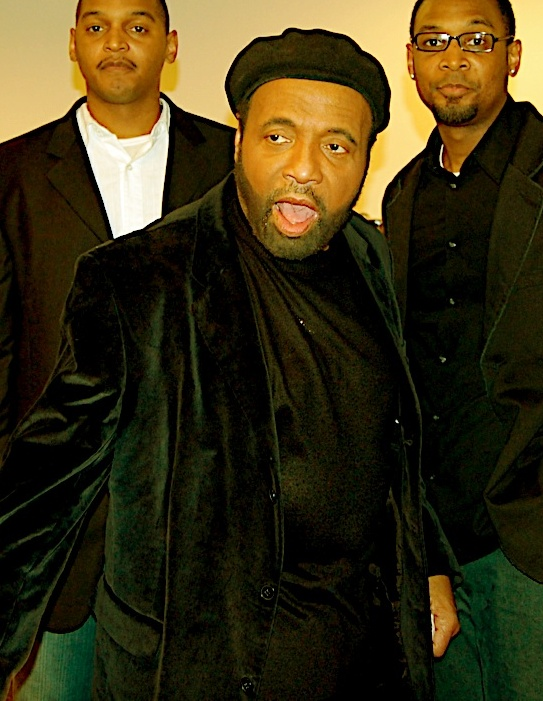
- Crouch in 2008

Background information
- Born: Andraé Edward Crouch; July 1, 1942; Los Angeles, California, U.S.
- Died: January 8, 2015 (aged 72) Los Angeles, California, U.S.
- Genres: Gospel, contemporary Christian
- Occupations: Singer; songwriter; arranger; record producer; choir director; pastor
- Instruments: Vocals, piano, organ
- Years active: 1966–2014
- Labels: Liberty/UA; Light; Qwest/Warner Bros.; Verity/Jive; Riverphlo Entertainment
- Website: Andraé Crouch on Facebook

Andraé Edward Crouch (/ˈɑːndreɪ/; July 1, 1942 – January 8, 2015) was an American gospel singer, songwriter, arranger, record producer and pastor. Referred to as "the father of modern gospel music" by contemporary Christian and gospel music professionals, Crouch was known for his compositions "The Blood Will Never Lose Its Power", "My Tribute (To God Be the Glory)" and "Soon and Very Soon". He collaborated on some of his recordings with famous and popular artists such as Stevie Wonder, El DeBarge, Philip Bailey, Chaka Khan, and Sheila E., as well as the vocal group Take 6, and many popular artists covered his material, including Bob Dylan, Barbara Mandrell, Paul Simon, Elvis Presley and Little Richard. In the 1980s and 1990s, he was known as the "go-to" producer for superstars who sought a gospel choir sound in their recordings; he appeared on a number of recordings, including Michael Jackson's "Man In the Mirror", Madonna's "Like a Prayer", and "The Power", a duet between Elton John and Little Richard. Crouch was noted for his talent of incorporating contemporary secular music styles into the gospel music he grew up with. His efforts in this area helped pave the way for early American contemporary Christian music during the 1960s and 1970s.

Crouch's original music arrangements were heard in the films The Color Purple, for which he received an Oscar nomination, and Disney's The Lion King, as well as the NBC television series Amen. Awards and honors received by him include seven Grammy Awards, induction into the Gospel Music Hall of Fame in 1998, and a star on the Hollywood Walk of Fame.

== Early years ==
Andraé Edward Crouch was born, along with his twin sister, Sandra Crouch, on July 1, 1942, in Los Angeles, California, to parents Benjamin and Catherine (née Hodnett) Crouch. His father was a minister in the Church of God in Christ (COGIC) and pastored Christ Memorial Church of God in Christ in Pacoima, California. When he was young, Crouch's parents owned and operated Crouch Cleaners, a dry-cleaning business, as well as a restaurant business in Los Angeles, California. In addition to running the family's businesses, Crouch's parents also had a Christian street-preaching ministry and a hospital and prison ministry. When Crouch was 11, his father was invited to speak for several weeks at a small church as a guest preacher. Crouch's father and the church's congregation encouraged the young boy to play during the services. At the piano, Crouch found the key in which the congregation was singing and started to play. After this, Crouch honed his piano-playing skills and, in time, wanted to write his own music. When he was 14 years old, he wrote his first Gospel song.

== Career ==
=== Groups ===
Crouch's first musical group was formed in 1960 as the Church of God in Christ Singers (COGICS). The group included future recording artist and session musician Billy Preston on keyboards and was the first to record Crouch's song "The Blood Will Never Lose Its Power". The song's popularity grew following the initial 1964 recording, becoming a standard in churches and hymnals worldwide. While attending Valley Junior College in the San Fernando Valley to become a teacher, he formed the gospel music group "The Disciples" in 1965 with fellow musicians Perry Morgan, Reuben Fernandez, and Bili Thedford. The group became a frequent attraction at "Monday Night Sing" concerts in southern California put on by Audrey Mieir, a Christian minister and music composer who frequently sponsored new Christian music groups. Following Mieir's introduction of Crouch to Manna Music Publishing's founders Tim and Hal Spencer, Manna published Crouch's song "The Blood Will Never Lose Its Power", written when he was 15 years old. The Spencers helped launch Crouch's recording career by introducing him to Light Records founder and prolific Christian songwriter Ralph Carmichael. After the addition of Sherman Andrus to The Disciples, Light Records recorded and released the group's first album, Take the Message Everywhere, in 1968. Following the group's first album release, Crouch's twin sister, Sandra, joined The Disciples in 1970 after Fernandez' departure. Two more albums would follow, Keep On Singin' and Soulfully, before a major change in the group's lineup in 1972.

When Sherman Andrus left the Disciples to join the Imperials, he was replaced by singer Danniebelle Hall. More musicians were being added and the group's membership by the early 1970s included Fletch Wiley on trumpet, Harlan Rogers on keyboards, Hadley Hockensmith on bass, and Bill Maxwell on drums. The group appeared on The Tonight Show Starring Johnny Carson in 1972 and to sold-out crowds at Carnegie Hall in 1975 and 1979. Crouch's most popular songs with the group included "The Blood Will Never Lose Its Power", "Through It All", "Bless His Holy Name", "Soon and Very Soon", "Jesus is the Answer", and "My Tribute".

=== Solo career ===
After The Disciples disbanded in 1982, Crouch continued on with a solo career. His backing ensemble included Howard Smith, Linda McCrary, Táta Vega, and Kristle Murden, along with The Andraé Crouch Singers. Joe Sample, Wilton Felder, Dean Parks, David Paich, Phillip Bailey, Stevie Wonder, El DeBarge, and other secular artists were included in Crouch's recording sessions. With former Disciples drummer-turned-producer Bill Maxwell, Crouch co-produced projects for The Winans, Danniebelle Hall, and Kristle Murden. Many musical acts and solo performers covered his more popular works, including Elvis Presley with "I've Got Confidence". In 1986, Crouch composed the theme music of the Sherman Hemsley sitcom Amen, sung by Vanessa Bell Armstrong.

In 2006 Crouch released Mighty Wind, a 40th anniversary album featuring guest performances by Lauren Evans, Crystal Lewis, Karen Clark Sheard, Táta Vega, and Marvin Winans.

=== TV appearances ===
Crouch made his musical guest debut on Saturday Night Live on May 24, 1980, the Season 5 finale, hosted by actor Buck Henry, along with Andrew Gold and The Voices of Unity; which coincidentally, was the final episode for everyone in the cast. Crouch & the Voices of Unity performed "Can't Nobody Do Me Like Jesus". On February 7, 1982, Crouch guest appeared in Season 8 Episode 16 "Man of the Cloth" on The Jeffersons. He also appeared in the TV movie In Search of Dr. Seuss, playing the title character in "Yertle the Turtle".

=== Influence ===
Crouch has been credited as a key figure in Jesus music of the 1960s and 1970s and, as a result, helping to bring about contemporary Christian music into the church. As well, he is also credited with helping to bridge the gap between black and white Christian music and revolutionizing the sound of urban Gospel music. Though sometimes criticized for diluting the Christian message by using contemporary music styles, his songs have become staples in churches and hymnals around the world and have been recorded by mainstream artists such as Elvis Presley and Paul Simon.

His affiliation with Light Records was instrumental in bringing Walter and Tramaine Hawkins, Jessy Dixon and The Winans to the label, from where they all enjoyed successful gospel music careers.

In 1996, Crouch and his music were honored on the Grammy Award-winning CD, Tribute: The Songs of Andraé Crouch, released by Warner Bros. Records. The album featured a wide range of artists performing Crouch's classic songs and featured the Brooklyn Tabernacle Choir, Take 6, Twila Paris, and Michael W. Smith.

Crouch and his sister Sandra had a friendship and music relationship with Michael Jackson. In 1987, the Andraé Crouch Choir sang background vocals along with Siedah Garrett and The Winans on Jackson's hit single "Man in the Mirror" from the Bad album. The Andraé Crouch Singers were also featured on the songs "Keep the Faith" and "Will You Be There" from Jackson's 1991 Dangerous album. On Jackson's HIStory: Past, Present and Future, Book I project in 1995, the Andraé Crouch Choir is heard on "Earth Song." They are also heard on "Morphine" from HIStory's remix album Blood on the Dance Floor: HIStory in the Mix as well as "Speechless" from the Invincible album. Crouch's composition "Soon and Very Soon" was performed by the Andraé Crouch Choir at the public memorial service for Jackson held at the Staples Center in Los Angeles on July 7, 2009.

== Personal life ==
In 1982, Crouch was arrested in Los Angeles during a routine traffic stop for possession of cocaine. Crouch claimed the cocaine belonged to a friend. Subsequently, the district attorney declined to press charges due to lack of sufficient evidence.

Between 1993 and 1994, Crouch suffered the loss of his father, mother, and older brother. After his father's death, Crouch and his sister took over the shared duty of senior pastor at the church his parents founded, Christ Memorial Church of God in Christ in Pacoima, California.

=== Failing health and death ===
Crouch survived a number of personal attacks from four different forms of cancer, which claimed the life of his mother, father and brother in 1993 and 1994. He was also hospitalized for complications from diabetes in his last few years of life. In early December 2014, Crouch was hospitalized for pneumonia and congestive heart failure. As a result, his December 2014 tour was postponed. He was hospitalized again on January 3, 2015, in Los Angeles, as the result of a heart attack.

On January 8, 2015, Crouch died at Northridge Hospital Medical Center. He was 72. On the same day, his sister, Sandra, released the following statement: "Today my twin brother, womb-mate and best friend went home to be with the Lord. Please keep me, my family and our church family in your prayers. I tried to keep him here but God loved him best."

Following Crouch's death, Christian recording artist Michael W. Smith told Billboard Magazine, "...I'll never forget hearing Andraé for the first time. It was like someone had opened a whole new world of possibilities for me musically. I don't think there is anyone who inspired me more, growing up, than Andraé Crouch. The depth of his influence on Christian music is incalculable. We all owe him so much and I'll forever be grateful for the times we got to work together."

== Discography ==
=== Andraé Crouch and The Disciples ===
- 1968: Take the Message Everywhere (Light)
- 1971: Keep on Singin' (Light)
- 1972: Soulfully (Light)
- 1973: Live at Carnegie Hall (Light)
- 1975: Take Me Back (Light)
- 1976: This Is Another Day (Light)
- 1978: Live in London (Light)

=== Solo recordings ===
- 1972: Just Andrae (Light)
- 1979: I'll Be Thinking of You (Light)
- 1981: Don't Give Up (Warner Bros.)
- 1982: Finally (Light)
- 1984: No Time to Lose (Light)
- 1986: Autograph (Light)
- 1994: Mercy (Qwest)
- 1997: Pray (Qwest)
- 1998: Gift of Christmas (Qwest)
- 2006: Mighty Wind (Verity)
- 2011: The Journey (Riverphlo Entertainment)
- 2013: Live in Los Angeles

=== Other credits ===
Crouch later worked as a producer and arranger with Michael Jackson, Madonna, Quincy Jones, Mika (We Are Golden), Diana Ross, Elton John, Rick Astley ("Cry for Help") and Prefab Sprout. Crouch also had a long relationship with the Oslo Gospel Choir, which he occasionally produced, arranged for and performed with. In 2014, Crouch joined a cast of artists from around the world on a recording of "One World" by Hong Kong duo the Chung Brothers.

== Awards ==
Crouch won numerous awards throughout his career that included seven Grammy Awards and four GMA Dove Awards. He was also the recipient of ASCAP, Billboard, and NAACP Awards. In 2004, he became the only living Gospel artist – and just the third in history – to have a star on the Hollywood Walk of Fame.

In 2011, Sandra and Andrae Crouch were granted an honorary "Artist-in-Residence" Award by the International Center of Worship of Regent University in Virginia Beach, Virginia.

=== Grammy Awards ===
The Grammy Awards are awarded annually by the National Academy of Recording Arts and Sciences. Crouch has received seven awards out of twenty nominations.

Year	Category	Nominated work	Result
1970	Best Soul Gospel Performance	Christian People	Nominated
1973	Best Gospel Performance (Other Than Soul Gospel)	Just Andraé	Nominated
1975	Best Soul Gospel Performance	"Take Me Back"	Won
1976	Best Soul Gospel Performance	This Is Another Day (Album)	Nominated
1978	Best Soul Gospel Performance, Contemporary	Live in London	Won
1979	Best Soul Gospel Performance, Contemporary	I'll Be Thinking of You	Won
1979	Best Soul Gospel Performance, Contemporary	Push For Excellence (Album)	Nominated
1980	Best Gospel Performance, Contemporary Or Inspirational	"The Lord's Prayer"	Won
1980	Best Gospel Performance, Contemporary Or Inspirational	"It's Gonna Rain (Single)"	Nominated
1981	Best Soul Gospel Performance, Contemporary	Don't Give Up	Won
1982	Best Soul Gospel Performance, Traditional	We Need To Hear From You (Track)	Nominated
1982	Best Gospel Performance, Contemporary	My Tribute (Track)	Nominated
1982	Best Soul Gospel Performance, Contemporary	Finally (Album)	Nominated
1983	Best Soul Gospel Performance By A Duo Or Group	"He's Worthy (Track)"	Nominated
1983	Best Soul Gospel Performance By A Duo Or Group	"Glad I Heard Your Voice (Track)"	Nominated
1984	Best Soul Gospel Performance, Male	Always Remember	Won
1994	Best Pop/Contemporary Gospel Album	Mercy	Won
1997	Best Contemporary Soul Gospel Album	Pray (Album)	Nominated
1999	Best Pop/Contemporary Gospel Album	The Gift Of Christmas (Album)	Nominated
2011	Best Gospel Album	The Journey	Nominated

=== GMA Dove Awards ===
- Soul/Black gospel album
  - 1977 – This is another day(Light)
  - 1978 – Live in London (Light)
- Contemporary gospel album of the year
  - 1985 – No Time to Lose (Light)
  - 1998 – Pray (Qwest/Warner Bros.)
- Traditional gospel album of the year
  - 1993 – With all of my heart; Sandra Crouch and Friends (Sparrow)
- Contemporary gospel recorded song of the year
  - 1997 – "Take me back"; Tribute – The Songs of Andrae Crouch (songwriter) (Warner Alliance)
- Inducted into the Gospel Music Association's Gospel Music Hall of Fame in 1998

=== Other honors ===
- 1985: Oscar nomination for music compositions featured in The Color Purple
- 1997: Honorary Doctorate of Music from Berklee College of Music
- 2005: NARAS' Inaugural Salute to Gospel Music Lifetime Achievement Award recipient
- 2007: Christian Music Hall of Fame and Museum inductee
- 2012: How Sweet the Sound Living Legend Award

=== Filmography ===
Film

- 1985: The Color Purple songwriter: "Maybe God's Trying to Tell You Something"
- 1993: Once Upon a Forest songwriter: "He's Gone/He's Back"
- 1994: The Lion King arranger and choral conductor

Television

- 1980: Barbara Mandrell & The Mandrell Sisters special guest
- 1982: The Jeffersons "Men of the Cloth" episode
- 1982: SCTV Network 90 Christmas special
- 1986: Amen theme writer, arranger
- 1994: In Search of Dr. Seuss as Yertle the Turtle
- 1998: Nickelodeon's Cousin Skeeter
