= 44th Annual Grammy Awards =

2002 US music awards ceremony

- Date: February 27, 2002
- Location: Staples Center, Los Angeles, California
- Hosted by: Jon Stewart
- Most awards: Alicia Keys (5)
- Most nominations: U2 (8)
- Website: https://www.grammy.com/awards/44th-annual-grammy-awards

Television/radio coverage
- Network: CBS

The 44th Annual Grammy Awards were held on February 27, 2002, at the Staples Center in Los Angeles, California. The main recipient was Alicia Keys, winning five Grammys, including Best New Artist and Song of the Year for "Fallin'". U2 won four awards including Record of the Year and Best Rock Album, while opening the show with a performance of "Walk On".

== Performers ==
Artist(s)	Song(s)
U2	"Walk On"
Christina Aguilera Lil' Kim Mýa P!nk Patti LaBelle Missy Elliott	"Lady Marmalade"
Gillian Welch Alison Krauss Emmylou Harris	"Didn't Leave Nobody But The Baby"
Dr. Ralph Stanley	"O Death"
Alison Krauss & Union Station Pat Enright Gillian Welch Emmylou Harris	"I Am a Man of Constant Sorrow"
Train Paul Buckmaster Denise Djokic	"Drops of Jupiter"
Alejandro Sanz Destiny's Child	"Quisiera Ser"
Tony Bennett Billy Joel	"New York State of Mind"
*NSync Nelly	"Gone" "Girlfriend"
Alicia Keys Joaquin Cortes	"Fallin'" "A Woman's Worth"
Dave Matthews Band	"The Space Between"
Bob Dylan	"Cry a While"
Mary J. Blige	"No More Drama"
Joshua Bell	West Side Story Suite
Outkast	"Ms. Jackson"
Nelly Furtado Steve Vai	"I'm Like a Bird"
Alan Jackson	"Where Were You (When the World Stopped Turning)"
India.Arie	"Video"
Brian McKnight Al Green Hezekiah Walker CeCe Winans	Gospel Medley

== Presenters ==
- Matthew Perry and Britney Spears – presented Best Pop Performance by a Duo or Group with Vocals
- Natalie Cole, Dave Koz, and P. Diddy – presented Best Female Pop Vocal Performance
- Craig David, Steve Vai, and Nelly Furtado – presented Best Rap Album
- Backstreet Boys and Sarah Elizabeth Hughes – presented Best Pop Collaboration with Vocals
- Ja Rule, Pamela Anderson, and Jamie Foxx – presented Best R&B Album
- Don Henley and Trisha Yearwood – presented Best Rock Song
- Jamie O'Neal, Rob Thomas, and Kid Rock – presented Best Rock Performance by a Duo or Group with Vocals
- Dixie Chicks and Sheryl Crow – presented Best Country Collaboration with Vocals
- Kevin James and Ray Romano – presented Best New Artist
- Elvis Costello, Diana Krall, and Gwen Stefani – presented Song of the Year
- Bonnie Raitt, Celine Dion, and Stevie Wonder – presented Record of the Year
- Gloria Estefan, Matthew McConaughey, and Janet Jackson – presented Album of the Year

== Winners and Nominees ==
=== General ===
Record of the Year

- "Walk On" – U2
  - Brian Eno and Daniel Lanois, producers; Steve Lillywhite and Richard Rainey, engineer/mixers
- "Video" – India.Arie
  - India.Arie and Carlos "Six July" Broady, producers; Kevin Haywood and Mike Shipley, engineer/mixers
- "Fallin'" – Alicia Keys
  - Alicia Keys, producer; Kerry "Krucial" Brothers and Russ Elevado, engineer/mixers
- "Ms. Jackson" – OutKast
  - Earthtone III, producer; John Frye and Neal H Pogue, engineer/mixers
- "Drops of Jupiter" – Train
  - Brendan O'Brien, producer; Nick DiDia, Brendan O'Brien and Ryan Williams, engineer/mixers

Album of the Year

- O Brother, Where Art Thou? – Soundtrack – Various Artists^{[A]}
  - T Bone Burnett, producer; Mike Piersante and Peter Kurland, engineers/mixers; Gavin Lurssen, mastering engineer
- Acoustic Soul – India.Arie
  - India.Arie, Mark Batson, Carlos "Six July" Broady, Blue Miller and Bob Power, producers; Mark Batson, Carlos "Six July" Broady, Kevin Haywood, Avery Johnson, George Karas, Jim Lightman, Blue Miller, Mark Niemiec, Bob Power, Mike Shipley, Alvin Speights, Mike Tocci and Dave Way, engineer/mixers
- Love and Theft – Bob Dylan
  - Jack Frost, producer; Chris Shaw, engineer/mixer
- Stankonia – OutKast
  - Earthtone III, Organized Noize and Antonio "LA" Reid, producers; Jarvis Blackshear, Leslie Brathwaite, Josh Butler, Ralph Cacciurri, John Frye, Mark "DJ Exit" Goodchild, Carl Mo, Kevin Parker, Neal H Pogue, Richard H. Segal, Kenneth Stallworth, Matt Still, Jason Stokes, Bernasky Wall and Derrick Williams, engineer/mixers
- All That You Can't Leave Behind – U2
  - Brian Eno and Daniel Lanois, producers; Brian Eno, Steve Fitzmaurice, Julian Gallagher, Mike Hedges, Daniel Lanois, Steve Lillywhite, Tim Palmer, Richard Rainey and Richard Stannard, engineer/mixers

Song of the Year

- "Fallin'"
  - Alicia Keys, songwriter (Alicia Keys)
- "Drops of Jupiter"
  - Charlie Colin, Rob Hotchkiss, Patrick Monahan, Jimmy Stafford and Scott Underwood, songwriters (Train)
- "I'm Like a Bird"
  - Nelly Furtado, songwriter (Nelly Furtado)
- "Stuck in a Moment You Can't Get Out Of"
  - U2, songwriters (U2)
- "Video"
  - India.Arie, Carlos "Six July" Broady and Shannon Sanders, songwriters (India.Arie)

Best New Artist

- Alicia Keys
  - India.Arie
  - Nelly Furtado
  - David Gray
  - Linkin Park

=== Alternative ===
Best Alternative Music Album

- Parachutes – Coldplay
  - Strange Little Girls – Tori Amos
  - Vespertine – Björk
  - Halfway Between the Gutter and the Stars – Fatboy Slim
  - Amnesiac – Radiohead

=== Blues ===
Best Traditional Blues Album

- Do You Get The Blues? – Jimmie Vaughan
  - Smokin' Joint – Kim Wilson
  - Hellbound on My Trail: The Songs of Robert Johnson – Various Artists
  - Memphis Blood: The Sun Sessions – James Blood Ulmer
  - Richland Woman Blues – Maria Muldaur and Various Artists
  - Here and Now – Ike Turner and the Kings of Rhythm

Best Contemporary Blues Album

- Nothing Personal – Delbert McClinton
  - The Door – Keb' Mo'
  - Matriarch of the Blues – Etta James
  - Sweet Tea – Buddy Guy
  - Creole Moon – Dr. John

=== Children's ===
Best Musical Album for Children

- Elmo & the Orchestra – Sesame Street cast
  - All Wound Up! A Family Music Party – Cathy Fink & Marcy Marxer with Brave Combo
  - Big Wide Grin – Keb' Mo'
  - inFINity – Trout Fishing in America
  - Little House of Music Level 1 Package – Georgia S. Lucking with Various Artists

Best Spoken Word Album for Children

- Mama Don't Allow – Tom Chapin
  - Dr. Seuss' How the Grinch Stole Christmas! – CD Read-Along – Corey Burton and Various Artists
  - The Selfish Giant and the Nightingale and the Rose – Vanessa Redgrave and Stephen Fry
  - A Series of Unfortunate Events – Book 1: The Bad Beginning – Tim Curry
  - Timeless Tales and Music of Our Time – Ruth Westheimer

=== Classical ===
- Best Orchestral Performance
  - Helmut Burk & Karl-August Naegler (producers), Jobst Eberhardt, Stephan Flock (engineers), Pierre Boulez (conductor) & the Chicago Symphony Orchestra for Boulez Conducts Edgard Varèse (Amériques; Arcana; Déserts; Ionisation)
- Best Classical Vocal Performance
  - Christopher Raeburn (producer), Jonathan Stokes (engineer), Bernhard Forck (conductor), Cecilia Bartoli & the Akademie für Alte Musik Berlin for Dreams & Fables - Gluck Italian Arias (Tremo Gra' Fubbi Miei; Die Questa Cetra In Seno, etc.)
- Best Opera Recording
  - James Mallinson (producer), Simon Rhodes (engineer), Colin Davis (conductor), Michelle DeYoung, Ben Heppner, Petra Lang, Peter Mattei, Stephen Milling, Sara Mingardo, Kenneth Tarver & the London Symphony Orchestra for Berlioz: Les Troyens
- Best Choral Performance
  - Martin Sauer (producer), Michael Brammann (engineer), Nikolaus Harnoncourt (conductor), Norbert Balatsch, Erwin Ortner (chorus masters), Bernarda Fink, Matthias Goerne, Dietrich Henschel, Elisabeth von Magnus, Christoph Prégardien, Dorothea Röschmann, Michael Schade, Christine Schäfer, Markus Schäfer, Oliver Widmer, the Arnold Schoenberg Chor, Wiener Sängerknaben & Concentus Musicas Wien for Bach: St. Matthew Passion
- Best Instrumental Soloist(s) Performance (with orchestra)
  - Martin Fouqué (producer), Eberhard Sengpiel (engineer), Daniel Barenboim, Dale Clevenger, Larry Combs, Alex Klein, David McGill & the Chicago Symphony Orchestra for Richard Strauss Wind Concertos (Horn Concerto; Oboe Concerto, etc.)
- Best Instrumental Soloist Performance (without orchestra)
  - Arne Akselberg (producer & engineer) & Truls Mørk (producer & artist) for Benjamin Britten Cello Suites (1 - 3)
- Best Small Ensemble Performance (with or without conductor)
  - Helmut Mühle (producer), Philipp Nedel (engineer), Gidon Kremer (producer & artist) & Kremerata Baltica for After Mozart
- Best Chamber Music Performance
  - Joanna Nickrenz (producer), Marc J. Aubort (engineer) & The Angeles String Quartet for Joseph Haydn: The Complete String Quartets
- Best Classical Contemporary Composition
  - Christopher Rouse (composer), Muhai Tang (conductor), Sharon Isbin & the Gulbenkian Orchestra for Concert de Gaudí for Guitar and Orchestra
- Best Classical Album
  - James Mallinson (producer), Simon Rhodes (engineer), Colin Davis (conductor), Michelle DeYoung, Ben Heppner, Petra Lang, Peter Mattei, Stephen Milling, Sara Mingardo, Kenneth Tarver & the London Symphony Orchestra & Chorus for Berlioz: Les Troyens
- Best Classical Crossover Album
  - Edgar Meyer (producer), Robert Battaglia (engineer), Béla Fleck (producer & artist), Joshua Bell, Evelyn Glennie, Gary Hoffman, Edgar Meyer, Chris Thile & John Christopher Williams for Perpetual Motion

=== Composing and arranging ===
Best Instrumental Composition

- "Cast Away End Credits"
  - Alan Silvestri, composer (Alan Silvestri)
- "Communion"
  - John Patitucci, composer (John Patitucci)
- "The Eternal Vow"
  - Tan Dun, composer (Tan Dun)
- "Oren (Pray)"
  - Gonzalo Rubalcaba, composer (Gonzalo Rubalcaba)
- "Theme from Blonde"
  - Patrick Williams, composer (Patrick Williams)

Best Instrumental Arrangement

- "Debussy: Doctor Gradus Ad Parnassum"
  - Béla Fleck and Edgar Meyer, arrangers (Béla Fleck with Joshua Bell and Gary Hoffmann)
- "En la Orilla del Mundo (At the Edge of the World)"
  - Gonzalo Rubalcaba, arranger (Charlie Haden)
- "Scheherazade Fantasy"
  - Lalo Schifrin, arranger (Lalo Schifrin)
- "Soul Bossa Nova"
  - George S. Clinton, arranger (George S. Clinton)
- "Take the "A" Train"
  - Bob Florence, arranger (Bob Florence and the SWR Big Band)

Best Instrumental Arrangement Accompanying Vocalist(s)

- "Drops of Jupiter (Tell Me)"
  - Paul Buckmaster, arranger (Train)
- "Easy Living"
  - Kurt Elling and Laurence Hobgood, arrangers (Kurt Elling)
- "Fascinating Rhythm"
  - Billy Childs, arranger (Dianne Reeves)
- "Love Letters"
  - Claus Ogerman, arranger (Diana Krall)
- "You're My Thrill"
  - Johnny Mandel, arranger (Shirley Horn)

=== Country ===
Best Female Country Vocal Performance

- "Shine" – Dolly Parton
  - "I Would've Loved You Anyway" – Trisha Yearwood
  - "Cold, Cold Heart" – Lucinda Williams
  - "Long Gone Lonesome Blues" – Sheryl Crow
  - "There Is No Arizona" – Jamie O'Neal

Best Male Country Vocal Performance

- "O Death" – Ralph Stanley
  - "Lovesick Blues" – Ryan Adams
  - "I Dreamed About Mama Last Night" – Johnny Cash
  - "San Antonio Girl" – Lyle Lovett
  - "Grown Men Don't Cry" – Tim McGraw
  - "Marie" – Willie Nelson

Best Country Performance by a Duo or Group with Vocal

- "The Lucky One" – Alison Krauss & Union Station
  - "Ain't Nobody Here but Us Chickens" – Asleep at the Wheel
  - "Ain't Nothing 'bout You" – Brooks & Dunn
  - "One More Day" – Diamond Rio
  - "I'm Already There" – Lonestar

Best Country Collaboration with Vocals

- "I am a Man of Constant Sorrow" – Harley Allen, Pat Enright, and Dan Tyminski (The Soggy Bottom Boys)
  - "Didn't Leave Nobody but the Baby" – Emmylou Harris, Alison Krauss, and Gillian Welch
  - "Beer Run (B Double E Double Are You In?)" – George Jones and Garth Brooks
  - "Bring On the Rain" – Jo Dee Messina and Tim McGraw
  - "Inside Out" – Trisha Yearwood and Don Henley

Best Country Instrumental Performance

- "Foggy Mountain Breakdown" – Jerry Douglas, Gen Duncan, Vince Gill, Albert Lee, Steve Martin, Leon Russell, Earl Scruggs, Gary Scruggs, Randy Scruggs, Paul Shaffer, and Marty Stuart
  - "Sugar-Foot Rag" – Asleep at the Wheel and Brad Paisley
  - "Poultry in Motion" – Bill Kirchen
  - "Choctaw Hayride" – Alison Krauss & Union Station
  - "Munster Rag" – Brad Paisley

Best Country Song

- "The Lucky One"
  - Robert Lee Castleman, songwriter (Alison Krauss & Union Station)
- "I'm Already There"
  - Gary Baker, Richie McDonald, and Frank Myers, songwriters (Lonestar)
- "One More Day"
  - Steven Dale Jones and Bobby Tomberlin, songwriters (Diamond Rio)
- "There Is No Arizona"
  - Lisa Drew, Jamie O'Neal, and Shaye Smith, songwriters (Jamie O'Neal)
- "When I Think About Angels"
  - Roxie Dean, Jamie O'Neal, and Sonny Tillis, songwriters (Jamie O'Neal)

Best Country Album

- Timeless – Hank Williams Tribute – Various Artists
  - One More Day – Diamond Rio
  - Set This Circus Down – Tim McGraw
  - Rainbow Connection – Willie Nelson
  - Inside Out – Trisha Yearwood

Best Bluegrass Album

- New Favorite – Alison Krauss & Union Station
  - Mountain Soul – Patty Loveless
  - Little Sparrow – Dolly Parton
  - History of the Future – Ricky Skaggs and Kentucky Thunder
  - Clinch Mountain Sweethearts – Ralph Stanley and Friends

=== Film/TV/media ===
Best Compilation Soundtrack Album for a Motion Picture, Television or Other Visual Media

- O Brother, Where Art Thou? – Various Artists
  - Bridget Jones's Diary: Music from the Motion Picture – Various Artists
  - Moulin Rouge! Music from Baz Luhrmann's Film – Various Artists
  - Shrek – Various Artists
  - The Sopranos - Peppers & Eggs (Music from the HBO Original Series) – Various Artists

Best Song Written for a Motion Picture, Television or Other Visual Media

- "Boss of Me" from Malcolm in the Middle
  - John Flansburgh and John Linnell, songwriters (They Might Be Giants)
- "A Love Before Time" from Crouching Tiger, Hidden Dragon
  - Jorge Calandrelli, Tan Dun, and James Schamus, songwriters (Coco Lee)
- "My Funny Friend and Me" from The Emperor's New Groove
  - David Hartley and Sting, songwriters (Sting)
- "There You'll Be" from Pearl Harbor
  - Diane Warren, songwriter (Faith Hill)
- "Win" from Men of Honor
  - Brandon Barnes and Brian McKnight, songwriters (Brian McKnight)

Best Score Soundtrack Album for a Motion Picture, Television or Other Visual Media

- Crouching Tiger, Hidden Dragon – Tan Dun
  - A.I. Artificial Intelligence – John Williams
  - Chocolat – Rachel Portman
  - Men of Honor – Mark Isham
  - Planet of the Apes – Danny Elfman
  - Traffic – Cliff Martinez

=== Folk ===
Best Traditional Folk Album

- Down from the Mountain – Various Artists
  - Looking Back Tomorrow: BeauSoleil Live! – BeauSoleil
  - Hamilton Ironworks – John Hartford
  - Treasures from the Folk Den – Roger McGuinn and Various Artists
  - Avalon Blues – A Tribute to the Musi of Mississippi John Hurt – Various Artists

Best Contemporary Folk Album

- Love and Theft – Bob Dylan
  - Buddy & Julie Miller – Buddy and Julie Miller
  - Poet: A Tribute to Townes Van Zandt – Various Artists
  - Time (The Revelator) – Gillian Welch
  - Essence – Lucinda Williams

Best Native American Music Album

- Bless the People: Harmonized Peyote Songs – Johnny Mike and Verdell Primeaux
  - Life Goes On: Hand Drum and Round Dance Songs – Black Eagle
  - Weasel Tail's Dream – The Tradition Continues – Black Lodge Singers
  - Rockin' the Rez – Northern Cree
  - Gathering of Nations 2000: Millennium Celebration – Vol. 1 – Various Northern Drums
  - Change of Life – Oklahoma Pow-Wow Songs – Young Bird

=== Gospel ===
Best Pop/Contemporary Gospel Album

- CeCe Winans – CeCe Winans
  - Oxygen – Avalon
  - Declaration – Steven Curtis Chapman
  - Talk About It – Nicole C. Mullen
  - Worship – Michael W. Smith

Best Rock Gospel Album

- Solo – DC Talk
  - Big Tent Revival Live – Big Tent Revival
  - Flap Your Wings – The Choir
  - Sonicpraise – Sonicflood
  - The Last Street Preacha – T-Bone

Best Traditional Soul Gospel Album

- Spirit of the Century – Blind Boys of Alabama
  - Hymns – Shirley Caesar
  - Not Guilty ... The Experience – John P. Kee and the New Life Community Choir
  - Show Up & Show Out – Dottie Peoples
  - Persuaded – Live in D.C. – Richard Smallwood with Vision

Best Contemporary Soul Gospel Album

- The Experience – Yolanda Adams
  - Live in Concert – Kim Burrell
  - In Case You Missed It ... And Then Some – Fred Hammond
  - Still Tramaine – Tramaine Hawkins
  - Melodies of My Heart – Angie Winans

Best Southern, Country or Bluegrass Gospel Album

- Bill & Gloria Gaither Present a Billy Graham Music Homecoming – Bill & Gloria Gaither and the Homecoming Friends
  - God Is Love: The Gospel Sessions – Ann-Margret and the Jordanaires, Light Crust Doughboys with James Blackwood
  - Two Old Friends – Merle Haggard and Albert E. Brumley Jr.
  - From the Heart – The Oak Ridge Boys
  - Inspirational Journey – Randy Travis

Best Gospel Choir or Chorus Album

- Love Is Live!
  - Hezekiah Walker, choir director (LFT Church Choir)
- All About Him (Jesus)
  - Patrina Smith, choir director (O'Landa Draper's Associates)
- Calling on You
  - Percy Gray Jr., William Hamilton, and Felicia Welch, choir directors (Chicago Mass Choir)
- Light of the World
  - Carol Cymbala, choir director (Brooklyn Tabernacle Choir)
- The Storm Is Over
  - Steve Lawrence, choir director (The Potter's House Mass Choir)

=== Historical ===
Best Historical Album

- Lady Day: The Complete Billie Holiday on Columbia 1933–1944
  - Michael Brooks and Michael Cuscuna, compilation producers; Matt Cavaluzzo, Harry Coster, Seth Foster, Darcy Proper, Ken Robertson, and Mark Wilder, mastering engineers (Billie Holiday)
- Charlie Parker: The Complete Savoy and Dial Studio Recordings 1944-1948
  - Orrin Keepnews, compilation producer; Paul W. Reid III, mastering engineer (Charlie Parker)
- Arhoolie Records 40th Anniversary Collection: 1960-2000 The Journey of Chris Strachwitz
  - Chris Strachwitz and Elijah Wald, compilation producers; Mike Cogan, mastering engineer (Various Artists)
- The Long Road to Freedom — An Anthology of Black Music
  - David Belafonte, Harry Belafonte, and Albert C. Pryor, compilation producers; Michael O. Drexler, mastering engineer (Various Artists)
- Washington Square Memoirs: The Great Urban Folk Boom 1950-1970
  - Ted Myers, compilation producer; Bob Fisher, mastering engineer (Various Artists)

=== Jazz ===
Best Jazz Instrumental Solo

- "Chan's Song" – Michael Brecker
  - "Fragile" – Kenny Barron and Regina Carter
  - "Lost in a Fog" – Terence Blanchard
  - "Move" – Gary Burton
  - "All Blues" – Pat Martino

Best Jazz Instrumental Album

- This Is What I Do – Sonny Rollins
  - Kindred – Stefon Harris and Jacky Terrasson
  - Birds of a Feather – A Tribute to Charlie Parker – Roy Haynes with Dave Holland, Roy Hargrove, David Kikoski, and Kenny Garrett
  - Not for Nothin' – Dave Holland Quintet
  - Live at Yoshi's – Pat Martino

Best Large Jazz Ensemble Album

- Homage to Count Basie – Bob Mintzer Big Band
  - Impulsive! – Eliane Elias, Bob Brookmeyer, and the Danish Radio Jazz Orchestra
  - Rob McConnell Tentet – Rob McConnell Tentet
  - Group Therapy – Jim McNeely Tentet
  - Dear Louis – Nicholas Payton

Best Jazz Vocal Album

- The Calling: Celebrating Sarah Vaughan – Dianne Reeves
  - The Mose Chronicles – Live in London, Vol. 1 – Mose Allison
  - Ballads – Remembering John Coltrane – Karrin Allyson
  - Flirting with Twilight – Kurt Elling
  - You're My Thrill – Shirley Horn

Best Contemporary Jazz Album

- M² – Marcus Miller
  - CAB 2 – CAB (Dennis Chambers, Tony MacAlpine, Brian Auger, and Bunny Brunel)
  - Soul Insider – Bill Evans
  - Ethnomusicology, Vol. 2 – Russell Gunn
  - Voices – Mike Stern

Best Latin Jazz Album

- Nocturne – Charlie Haden
  - Los Hombres Calientes, Vol. 3: New Congo Square – Los Hombres Calientes
  - Supernova – Gonzalo Rubalcaba Trio
  - Travesia – David Sánchez
  - Calle 54 – Various Artists

=== Latin ===
Best Latin Pop Album

- La Música de Baldemar Huerta – Freddy Fender
  - Simplemente – Chayanne
  - Azul – Cristian Castro
  - Abrázame Muy Fuerte – Juan Gabriel
  - Mi Corazón – Jaci Velasquez

Best Traditional Tropical Latin Album

- Déjame entrar – Carlos Vives
  - Chanchullo – Rubén González
  - Canto – Los Super Seven
  - La Charanga Eterna – Orquesta Aragón
  - Las Flores De La Vida – Compay Segundo

Best Mexican/Mexican-American Album

- En Vivo... El Hombre y su Música – Ramón Ayala y sus Bravos del Norte
  - Lo Mejor de Nosotros – Pepe Aguilar
  - Mas con el Numero Uno – Vicente Fernández
  - Muevete Muevete Mas – Grupo Atrapado
  - Contigo – La Mafia
  - Sangre Caliente – Los Terribles del Norte

Best Latin Rock/Alternative Album

- Embrace the Chaos – Ozomatli
  - Gozo Poderoso – Aterciopelados
  - Próxima Estación: Esperanza – Manu Chao
  - Cuando la Sangre Galopa – Jaguares
  - Fíjate Bien – Juanes

Best Tejano Album

- Nadie Como Tu – Solido
  - 20/20 MMXX Twenty-Viente – David Lee Garza y Los Musicales
  - Retro-Momentos – Leonard Gonzales y Los Magnificos
  - Obsesion – Los Palominos
  - Lo Dice Tu Mirada – Emilio Navaira

Best Salsa Album

- Encore – Roberto Blades
  - Doble Play – Oscar D'León y Wladimir Lozano
  - Por Tu Placer – Frankie Negrón
  - En Otra Onda – Tito Nieves
  - Intenso – Gilberto Santa Rosa

Best Merengue Album

- Yo Por Tí – Olga Tañón
  - Haciendo Travesuras – Chico Malo
  - 8 – Gisselle
  - Grupomania 2050 – Grupo Manía
  - Yo Soy Tono – Toño Rosario

=== Musical show ===
Best Musical Show Album

- The Producers – Mel Brooks, composer/lyricist (Original Broadway Cast with Nathan Lane and Matthew Broderick)
  - The Full Monty – David Yazbek, composer/lyricist (Original Broadway Cast)
  - Mamma Mia! the Musical – Benny Andersson and Björn Ulvaeus, composers/lyricists (Original Broadway Cast)
  - Seussical the Musical – Stephen Flaherty, composer; Lynn Ahrens and Dr. Seuss, lyricists (Original Broadway Cast including Kevin Chamberlin)
  - Sweeney Todd: Live at the New York Philharmonic – Stephen Sondheim, composer/lyricist (Patti LuPone, George Hearn, and others)

=== Music video ===
Best Short Form Music Video

- "Weapon Of Choice" – Fatboy Slim featuring Bootsy Collins
  - Spike Jonze video director; Vincent Landay & Deannie O'Neil, video producers
- "Fly Away From Here" – Aerosmith
  - Joseph Kahn, video director; Greg Tharp, video producer
- "One Minute Man" – Missy "Misdemeanor" Elliott featuring Ludacris
  - David Meyers, video director; Ron Mohrhoff, video producer
- "Don't Tell Me" – Madonna
  - Jean-Baptiste Mondino, video director; Maria Gallagher, video producer
- "Ms. Jackson" – Outkast
  - F. Gary Gray, video director; Meredyth Frattolillo, video producer

Best Long Form Music Video

- Recording The Producers - A Musical Romp With Mel Brooks – Mel Brooks
  - Susan Froemke, video director; Susan Froemke & Peter Gelb, video producers
- Rebel Music - The Bob Marley Story – Bob Marley
  - Jeremy Marr, video director; Jeremy Marr, video producer
- Freddie Mercury - The Untold Story – Freddie Mercury
  - Rudi Dolezal & Hannes Rossacher, video directors; Jim Beach & Rudi Dolezal, video producers
- Play: The DVD – Moby
  - Moby, video director; Moby & Jeff Rogers, video producers

=== New Age ===
Best New Age Album

- A Day Without Rain – Enya
  - Live From Montana – Philip Aaberg
  - Cello Blue – David Darling
  - Ancient – Kitarō
  - Sacred Spirit II: More Chants and Dances of the Native Americans – Sacred Spirit

=== Packaging and notes ===
Best Recording Package

- Amnesiac (Special Limited Edition)
  - Stanley Donwood and Tchocky, art directors (Radiohead)
- Bedlam Ballroom
  - Lane Wurster, art director (Squirrel Nut Zippers)
- Levee Town
  - Megan Barra, art director (Sonny Landreth)
- Look into the Eyeball
  - Stephen Doyle, art director (David Byrne)
- Reveal
  - Chris Bilheimer and J. Michael Stipe, art directors (R.E.M.)

Best Boxed Recording Package

- Brain in a Box: The Science Fiction Collective
  - Hugh Brown and Steve Vance, art directors (Various Artists)
- The Long Road to Freedom: An Anthology of Black Music
  - Carol Bobolts, Jaime Boyle, and Deb Schuler, art directors (Various Artists)
- Charlie Parker: The Complete Savoy and Dial Studio Recordings 1944-1948
  - Christian Calabrò, art director (Charlie Parker)
- El Cancionero/Mas Y Mas: A History of the Band From East L.A.
  - James Austin, Hugh Brown, Louie Perez, Al Quattrocchi, and Jeff Smith, art directors (Los Lobos)
- Lady Day: The Complete Billie Holiday on Columbia 1933–1944
  - Ron Jaramillo and Adam T. Owett, art directors (Billie Holiday)

Best Album Notes

- Richard Pryor...And It's Deep Too! The Complete Warner Bros. Recordings (1968-1992)
  - Walter Mosley, notes writer (Richard Pryor)
- ''Arhoolie Records 40th Anniversary Collection: 1960-2000 the Journey of Chris Strachwitz
  - Elijah Wald, notes writer (Various Artists)
- The Long Road to Freedom: An Anthology of Black Music
  - Mari Evans, notes writer (Various Artists)
- The Stax Story
  - Rob Bowman, notes writer (Various Artists)
- Rhapsodies in Black: Music and Words From the Harlem Renaissance
  - Gerald Early, notes writer (Various Artists)

=== Polka ===
Best Polka Album

- Gone Polka – Jimmy Sturr
  - Live and Kickin' – Eddie Blazonczyk's Versatones
  - Kick-Ass Polkas – Brave Combo
  - Lenny Live – Lenny Gomulka and Chicago Push
  - Happy Times – Walter Ostanek and His Band

=== Pop ===
Best Female Pop Vocal Performance

- "I'm Like a Bird" – Nelly Furtado
  - "There You'll Be" – Faith Hill
  - "Someone to Call My Lover" – Janet Jackson
  - "By Your Side" – Sade
  - "Essence" – Lucinda Williams

Best Male Pop Vocal Performance

- "Don't Let Me Be Lonely Tonight" – James Taylor
  - "Fill Me In" – Craig David
  - "You Rock My World" – Michael Jackson
  - "I Want Love" – Elton John
  - "Still" – Brian McKnight

Best Pop Performance by a Duo or Group with Vocal

- "Stuck in a Moment You Can't Get Out Of" – U2
  - "Shape of My Heart" – Backstreet Boys
  - "Superman (It's Not Easy)" – Five for Fighting
  - "Gone" – *NSYNC"
  - "Imitation of Life" – R.E.M.

Best Pop Collaboration with Vocals

- "Lady Marmalade" – Christina Aguilera, Lil' Kim, Mýa, and P!nk
  - "Nobody Wants To Be Lonely" – Christina Aguilera and Ricky Martin
  - "New York State of Mind" – Tony Bennett and Billy Joel
  - "My Kind of Girl" – Brian McKnight and Justin Timberlake
  - "It Wasn't Me" – Shaggy and Ricardo "RikRok" Ducent

Best Pop Instrumental Performance

- "Reptile" – Eric Clapton
  - "Room 335" – Larry Carlton and Steve Lukather
  - "Short Circuit" – Daft Punk
  - "Rain" – Eric Johnson & Alien Love Child
  - "There You'll Be" – Kirk Whalum

Best Dance Recording

- "All for You" – Janet Jackson
  - "Angel" – Lionel Richie
  - "Out of Nowhere" – Gloria Estefan
  - "I Feel Loved" – Depeche Mode
  - "One More Time" – Daft Punk featuring Romanthony

Best Pop Vocal Album

- Lovers Rock – Sade
  - Celebrity – NSYNC
  - Songs from the West Coast – Elton John
  - All for You – Janet Jackson
  - Whoa, Nelly! – Nelly Furtado

Best Pop Instrumental Album

- No Substitutions: Live in Osaka – Larry Carlton and Steve Lukather
  - Unconditional – Kirk Whalum
  - Voice – Neal Schon
  - A Smooth Jazz Christmas – Dave Koz & Friends
  - AArt – Acoustic Alchemy

=== Production and engineering ===
Best Engineered Album, Non-Classical

- The Look of Love
  - Al Schmitt, engineer (Diana Krall)
- Ballads: Remembering John Coltrane
  - Josiah N. Gluck, engineer (Karrin Allyson)
- Time* Sex* Love*
  - Tony Castle, George Massenburg, and Jim Robeson, engineers (Mary Chapin Carpenter)
- New Favorite
  - Gary Paczosa, engineer (Alison Krauss & Union Station)
- Life on a String
  - "Bassy" Bob Brockmann and Martin Brumbach, engineers (Laurie Anderson)

Best Engineered Album, Classical

- Richard King (engineer) & Joshua Bell for Bernstein (Arr. Brohn & Corigliano): West Side Story Suite (Lonely Town; Make Our Garden Grow, Etc.)

Best Remixed Recording, Non-Classical

- "Thank You" (Deep Dish Vocal Remix)
  - Deep Dish, remixers (Dido)
- "Baby, Come Over (This Is Our Night)" (K-Klass Klub Mix)
  - K-Klass, remixers (Samantha Mumba)
- "Soul Shakedown" (Silk's Downunder Mix)
  - Steve "Silk" Hurley, remixer (Bob Marley)
- "I Feel Loved"
  - Danny Tenaglia, remixer (Depeche Mode)
- "Heard It All Before" (E-Smoove House Filter Mix)
  - E-Smoove, remixer (Sunshine Anderson)

Producer of the Year, Non-Classical

- T Bone Burnett
  - Jimmy Jam and Terry Lewis
  - Nigel Godrich
  - Gerald Eaton and Brian West
  - Dr. Dre

Producer of the Year, Classical

- Manfred Eicher

=== R&B ===
Best Female R&B Vocal Performance

- "Fallin'" – Alicia Keys
  - "Rock the Boat" – Aaliyah
  - "Video" – India.Arie
  - "Family Affair" – Mary J. Blige
  - "Hit 'em Up Style (Oops!)" – Blu Cantrell
  - "A Long Walk" – Jill Scott

Best Male R&B Vocal Performance

- "U Remind Me" – Usher
  - "Missing You" – Case
  - "Lifetime" – Maxwell
  - "Love of My Life" – Brian McKnight
  - "Love" – Musiq Soulchild

Best R&B Performance by a Duo or Group with Vocal

- "Survivor" – Destiny's Child
  - "What Would You Do?" – City High
  - "Can't Believe" – Faith Evans featuring Carl Thomas
  - "Contagious" – The Isley Brothers
  - "Peaches & Cream" – 112

Best R&B Song

- "Fallin'"
  - Alicia Keys, songwriter (Alicia Keys)
- "Didn't Cha Know?"
  - Erykah Badu, songwriter (Erykah Badu)
- "Get Ur Freak On"
  - Missy Elliott and Timothy Mosley, songwriters (Missy Elliott)
- "Hit 'Em Up Style (Oops!)"
  - Dallas Austin, songwriter (Blu Cantrell)
- "Love of My Life"
  - Brian McKnight, songwriter (Brian McKnight)
- "Video"
  - India.Arie, Carlos "Six July" Broady & Shannon Sanders, songwriters (India.Arie)

Best R&B Album

- Songs in A Minor – Alicia Keys
  - Aaliyah – Aaliyah
  - Acoustic Soul – India.Arie
  - No More Drama – Mary J. Blige
  - Survivor – Destiny's Child

Best Traditional R&B Vocal Album

- At Last – Gladys Knight
  - This Is Regina – Regina Belle
  - An American Original – Lamont Dozier
  - Three Wishes – Miki Howard
  - For the Love... – The O'Jays

=== Rap ===
Best Rap Solo Performance

- "Get Ur Freak On" – Missy "Misdemeanor" Elliott
  - "Because I Got High" – Afroman
  - "Who We Be" – DMX
  - "Izzo (H.O.V.A.)" – Jay-Z
  - "Ride wit Me" – Nelly

Best Rap Performance by a Duo or Group

- "Ms. Jackson" – OutKast
  - "Clint Eastwood" – Gorillaz
  - "Put It on Me" – Ja Rule featuring Lil' Mo and Vita
  - "Change the Game" – Jay-Z featuring Beanie Sigel and Memphis Bleek
  - "Bad Boy for Life" – P. Diddy, Black Rob and Mark Curry

Best Rap/Sung Collaboration

- "Let Me Blow Ya Mind" – Eve featuring Gwen Stefani
  - "Livin' It Up" – Ja Rule featuring Case
  - "Where the Party At" – Jagged Edge featuring Nelly
  - "Area Codes" – Ludacris featuring Nate Dogg
  - "W" – Mystic featuring Planet Asia

Best Rap Album

- Stankonia – OutKast
  - Scorpion – Eve
  - Pain Is Love – Ja Rule
  - The Blueprint – Jay-Z
  - Back for the First Time – Ludacris

=== Reggae ===
Best Reggae Album

- Halfway Tree – Damian Marley
  - Music Is Life – Beres Hammond
  - A New Day – Luciano
  - Many More Roads – Ky-Mani Marley
  - Island Warriors – Various Artists

=== Rock ===
Best Female Rock Vocal Performance

- "Get Right With God" – Lucinda Williams
  - "Planets of the Universe" – Stevie Nicks
  - "This Is Love" – PJ Harvey
  - "I Want to Be in Love" – Melissa Etheridge
  - "Strange Little Girl" – Tori Amos

Best Male Rock Vocal Performance

- "Dig In" – Lenny Kravitz
  - "Peaceful World" – John Mellencamp
  - "Honest With Me" – Bob Dylan
  - "Superman Inside" – Eric Clapton
  - "New York, New York" – Ryan Adams

Best Rock Performance by a Duo or Group with Vocal

- "Elevation" – U2
  - "Drops of Jupiter" – Train
  - "The Space Between" – Dave Matthews Band
  - "Yellow" – Coldplay
  - "Jaded" – Aerosmith

Best Rock Instrumental Performance

- "Dirty Mind" – Jeff Beck
  - "Whispering on a Prayer" – Steve Vai
  - "Always with Me, Always with You" – Joe Satriani
  - "Vampires" – Godsmack
  - "High Falls" – The Allman Brothers Band

Best Hard Rock Performance

- "Crawling" – Linkin Park
  - "Your Disease" – Saliva
  - "Renegades of Funk" – Rage Against the Machine
  - "Alive" – P.O.D.
  - "Smooth Criminal" – Alien Ant Farm

Best Metal Performance

- "Schism" – Tool
  - "Chop Suey!" – System of a Down
  - "Left Behind" – Slipknot
  - "Disciple" – Slayer
  - "The Wizard" – Black Sabbath

Best Rock Song

- "Drops of Jupiter"
  - Charlie Colin, Rob Hotchkiss, Pat Monahan, Jimmy Stafford, and Scott Underwood, songwriters (Train)
- "Yellow"
  - Guy Berryman, Jonny Buckland, Will Champion, and Chris Martin, songwriters (Coldplay)
- "Walk On"
  - Bono, Adam Clayton, The Edge, and Larry Mullen Jr., songwriters (U2)
- "Jaded"
  - Marti Frederiksen and Steven Tyler, songwriters (Aerosmith)
- "Elevation"
  - Bono, Adam Clayton, The Edge, and Larry Mullen Jr., songwriters (U2)

Best Rock Album

- All That You Can't Leave Behind – U2
  - Hybrid Theory – Linkin Park
  - Stories from the City, Stories from the Sea – PJ Harvey
  - Just Push Play – Aerosmith
  - Gold – Ryan Adams

=== Spoken ===
Best Spoken Word Album

- Q: The Autobiography of Quincy Jones – Quincy Jones
  - An Hour Before Daylight – Jimmy Carter
  - Lake Wobegon Summer 1956 – Garrison Keillor
  - Letters From the Earth – Uncensored Writings by Mark Twain – Carl Reiner
  - War Letters – Extraordinary Correspondence from American Wars – Various Artists

Best Spoken Comedy Album

- Napalm and Silly Putty' – George Carlin
  - The Bride of Firesign – The Firesign Theatre
  - I'm the One That I Want – Margaret Cho
  - Live at Carnegie Hall – Ray Romano
  - The Queens of Comedy – Laura Hayes, Adele Givens, Sommore, and Mo'Nique

=== Traditional Pop ===
Best Traditional Pop Vocal Album

- Songs I Heard – Harry Connick Jr.
  - Keely Sings Sinatra – Keely Smith
  - Romance on Film, Romance on Broadway – Michael Feinstein
  - Sentimental Journey: The Girl Singer and Her New Big Band – Rosemary Clooney
  - Stars and the Moon: Live at the Donmar – Betty Buckley

=== World ===
Best World Music Album

- Full Circle: Carnegie Hall 2000 – Ravi Shankar
  - Vol. 3: Further in Time – Afro Celt Sound System
  - Sao Vicente – Cesária Évora
  - Gil and Milton – Gilberto Gil and Milton Nascimento
  - Saturday Night in Bombay: Remember Shakti – John McLaughlin and Various Artists

== Special merit awards ==
Lifetime Achievement Award

  - Rosemary Clooney
  - Count Basie
  - Perry Como
  - Al Green
  - Joni Mitchell

Trustees Award

  - Arif Mardin
  - Phil Ramone

Tech Award

  - Les Paul
  - Digidesign

MusiCares Person of the Year

- Billy Joel

Recording Academy's Governors Award

- Janet Jackson

== Notes ==
A Award recipients also include Alison Krauss & Union Station, Chris Sharp, Chris Thomas King, Emmylou Harris, Gillian Welch, Harley Allen, John Hartford, Mike Compton, Norman Blake, Pat Enright, Peasall Sisters, Ralph Stanley, Sam Bush, Stuart Duncan, The Cox Family, The Fairfield Four, The Whites & Tim Blake Nelson as the artists.
