= Grammy Award for Best Classical Album =

- Awarded for: quality classical recordings
- Country: United States
- Presented by: National Academy of Recording Arts & Sciences
- First award: 1962
- Final award: 2011
- Website: grammy.com

The Grammy Award for Best Classical Album was awarded from 1962 to 2011. The award had several minor name changes:

- From 1962 to 1963, 1965 to 1972 and 1974 to 1976 the award was known as Album of the Year – Classical
- In 1964 and 1977 it was awarded as Classical Album of the Year
- In 1973 and from 1978 onward it was awarded as Best Classical Album

The award was discontinued in 2012 in a major overhaul of Grammy categories. From then on, recordings in this category fall under the Album of the Year category.

Years reflect the year in which the Grammy Awards were presented, for works released in the previous year.

== Winners and nominees ==
Year	Winner(s)	Title	Nominees	Ref.
1962	Igor Stravinsky (conductor), Columbia Symphony	Stravinsky Conducts, '60: Le Sacre du Primtemps; Petrushka	William Steinberg, Pittsburgh Symphony for Brahms: Symphony No. 2; Joan Sutherland, Francesco Molinari-Pradelli, Royal Opera House Orchestra for The Art of the Prima Donna; Laurindo Almeida for Reverie for Spanish Guitars; Leonard Bernstein, New York Philharmonic for Bloch: Sacred Service	
1963	Vladimir Horowitz	Columbia Records Presents Vladimir Horowitz	Bruno Walter (conductor), Columbia Symphony for Mahler: Symphony No. 9 in D minor; Igor Stravinsky (conductor), Columbia Symphony for Stravinsky: The Firebird Ballet; Jascha Heifetz, Gregor Piatigorsky for The Heifetz-Piatigorsky Concert with Primrose, Pennario and Guests; Otto Klemperer (conductor), Philharmonic Orchestra and Choir for Bach: St. Matthew Passion	
1964	Benjamin Britten (conductor), London Symphony Orchestra	Britten: War Requiem	Vladimir Horowitz for The Sound of Horowitz; Erich Leinsdorf (conductor), RCA Italiana Opera Orchestra and Chorus for Puccini: Madama Butterfly; George Szell (conductor), Cleveland Orchestra for Debussy: La Mer; Ravel: Daphnis et Chloe; Skitch Henderson (conductor), RCA Symphonic Orchestra and Chorus for Great Scenes from Gershwin's Porgy and Bess	
1965	Leonard Bernstein (conductor), New York Philharmonic	Bernstein: Symphony No. 3 (Kaddish)	Carlo Maria Giulini (conductor), Philharmonic Orchestra for Verdi: Requiem Mass; Erich Leinsdorf (conductor), Boston Symphony for Mahler: Symphony No. 5; Berg: Wozzeck Excerpts; Georg Solti (conductor), RCA Italiana Opera Orchestra and Chorus for Verdi: Falstaff; Herbert von Karajan (conductor), Vienna Philharmonic for Bizet: Carmen	
1966	Thomas Frost (producer), Vladimir Horowitz	Horowitz at Carnegie Hall, An Historic Return	Arthur Rubinstein for Chopin: 8 Polonaises and 4 Impromptus; Erich Leinsdorf (conductor), Boston Symphony for Strauss: Salome (Dance of the Seven Veils, Interlude and Final Scene); The Egyptian Helen (Awakening Scene; Karl Böhm (conductor), Orchestra of German Opera for Berg: Wozzeck; Leopold Stokowski (conductor), American Symphony Orchestra for Ives: Symphony No. 4	
1967	Howard Scott (producer), Morton Gould (conductor), Chicago Symphony	Ives: Symphony No. 1 in D minor	Aaron Copland (conductor), London Symphony for Aaron Copland Conducts (Music for a Great City, Statements); Colin Davis (conductor), London Symphony Orchestra for Handel: Messiah; Erich Leinsdorf (conductor), Boston Symphony for Mahler: Symphony No. 6 in A minor; Eugene Ormandy (conductor), Philadelphia Orchestra for Mahler: Symphony No. 10	
1968	John McClure (producer), Leonard Bernstein (conductor), London Symphony with soloists and choruses	Mahler: Symphony No. 8 in E-flat major (Symphony of a Thousand)	Francesco Molinari-Pradelli (conductor), RCA Italiana Opera Orchestra and Chorus for Puccini: La Rondine; Leonard Bernstein (conductor), Vienna Philharmonic for Mahler: Das Lied von der Erde; Leopold Stokowski (conductor), American Symphony Orchestra for Washington's Birthday; Leonard Bernstein (conductor), New York Philharmonic for The World of Charles Ives (Robert Browning Overture); Vladimir Horowitz for Horowitz in Concert	
1968	Thomas Z. Shepard (producer), Pierre Boulez (conductor), Doench, Isabel Strauss, Walter Berry, Fritz Uhl, Orchestra and Chorus of the Paris National Opera	Berg: Wozzeck	Francesco Molinari-Pradelli (conductor), RCA Italiana Opera Orchestra and Chorus for Puccini: La Rondine; Leonard Bernstein (conductor), Vienna Philharmonic for Mahler: Das Lied von der Erde; Leopold Stokowski (conductor), American Symphony Orchestra for Washington's Birthday; Leonard Bernstein (conductor), New York Philharmonic for The World of Charles Ives (Robert Browning Overture); Vladimir Horowitz for Horowitz in Concert	
1969	No award given			
1970	Rachel Elkind (producer), Wendy Carlos	Switched-On Bach	Luciano Berio (conductor), New York Philharmonic, Swingle Singers for Berio: Sinfonia; Philadelphia, Cleveland, and Chicago Brass Ensembles for Gabrieli: Antiphonal Music of Gabrieli; Pierre Boulez (conductor), BBC Symphony for Boulez Conducts Berg; Pierre Boulez (conductor), Cleveland Orchestra for Boulez Conducts Debussy, Vol. 2, Images Pour Orchestre; Zubin Mehta (conductor), Los Angeles Philharmonic for Strauss: Also Sprach Zarathustra	
1971	Erik Smith (producer), Colin Davis (conductor), Royal Opera House Orchestra and Chorus	Berlioz: Les Troyens	Eugene Ormandy (conductor), Philadelphia Symphony Orchestra for Shostakovich: Symphony No. 13; George Szell (conductor), Cleveland Orchestra for Brahms: Double Concerto; Herbert von Karajan (conductor), Berlin Philharmonic for Beethoven Edition '70; Michael Tilson Thomas (conductor), Boston Symphony for Ives: Three Places in New England; Ruggles: Sun Treader	
1972	Thomas Frost, Richard Killough (producers), Vladimir Horowitz	Horowitz Plays Rachmaninoff	Pierre Boulez (conductor), BBC Symphony for Boulez Conducts Boulez: Plia Selon Pli; Eugene Ormandy, Robert Page (conductors), Philadelphia Orchestra, Temple University Choirs for Penderecki: Utrenja, the Entombment of Christ; Eugene Ormandy (conductor), Philadelphia Orchestra for Shostakovich: Symphony No. 14; Colin Davis (conductor), Royal Opera House Orchestra, Covent Garden for Tippett: The Midsummer Marriage	
1973	David Harvey (producer), Georg Solti (conductor), Chicago Symphony, Vienna Boys Choir, Vienna Singervin Chorus	Mahler: Symphony No. 8 in E-flat major (Symphony of a Thousand)	Vladimir Horowitz for Horowitz Plays Chopin; Colin Davis (conductor), BBC Symphony, Chorus of Covent Garden for Berlioz: Benvenuto Cellini; Eugene Ormandy (conductor), Philadelphia Orchestra for Brahms: Concerto No. 2 in B-flat major for Piano; Georg Solti (conductor), Vienna Philharmonic for Wagner: Tannhauser; Leonard Bernstein (conductor), Ensemble Orchestra, Norman Scribner and Berkshire Boys' Choir for Bernstein: Mass	
1974	Thomas Z. Shepard (producer), Pierre Boulez (conductor), New York Philharmonic	Bartók: Concerto for Orchestra	Sergei Rachmaninoff for Rachmaninoff: The Complete Rachmaninoff, Vols. 1-3; Edward Downes (conductor), New Philharmonic for Puccini: Heroines; Eugene Ormandy (conductor), Philadelphia Orchestra for Rachmaninoff: Concerto No. 2 in C minor for Piano; Georg Solti (conductor), Chicago Symphony for Beethoven: Concertos (5) for Piano and Orchestra; Gunther Schuller (conductor), Conservatory Ragtime Ensemble for Joplin: The Red Back Book	
1975	David Harvey (producer), Georg Solti (conductor), Chicago Symphony	Berlioz: Symphonie Fantastique	Benjamin Britten (conductor), English Chamber Orchestra for Schumann: Faust; Carlos Kleiber (conductor), Dresden State Orchestra for Weber: Der Freischütz; Colin Davis (conductor), London Symphony Orchestra and Chorus, Ambrosias Singers, Wandsworth School Boys' Choir for Berlioz: The Damnation of Faust; Isao Tomita for Snowflakes are Dancing; Leonard Bernstein (conductor), London Symphony for Mahler: Symphony No. 2 in C minor (Resurrection); Various Artists for Ives: The 100th Anniversary	
1976	Raymond Minshull (producer), Georg Solti (conductor), Chicago Symphony	Beethoven: Symphonies (9) Complete	Carlos Kleiber (conductor), Vienna Philharmonic for Beethoven: Symphony No. 5 in C minor; Colin Davis (conductor), Royal Opera House for Mozart: Cosi Fan Tutte; Krzysztof Penderecki (conductor), Polish Radio National Symphony and Chorus for Penderecki: Magnificat; Michael Tilson Thomas, Robert Page (conductor), Cleveland Orchestra, Cleveland Orchestra Chorus and Boys' Choir for Orff: Carmina Burana	
1977	Max Wilcox (producer), Daniel Barenboim (conductor), London Philharmonic	Beethoven: The Five Piano Concertos	Vladimir Horowitz for Horowitz Concerts '75/76; David Munrow (conductor), Early Music Consort of London for The Art of Courtly Love; Gunther Schuller (conductor), Original Cast Orchestra and Chorus for Joplin: Treemonisha; Lorin Mazzael (conductor), Cleveland Orchestra for Gershwin: Porgy and Bess; Michael Tilson Thomas (conductor), Columbia Jazz Band, New York Philharmonic for Gershwin: An American in Paris; Rhapsody in Blue; Georg Solti (conductor), London Philharmonic for Bizet: Carmen	
1978	Thomas Frost (producer), Leonard Bernstein (conductor), Vladimir Horowitz, Dietrich Fischer-Dieskau, Isaac Stern, Mstislav Rostropovich, Yehudi Menuhin, Lyndon Woodside	Concert of the Century	Christopher Parkening for Parkening and the Guitar; Antal Dorati (conductor), Orchestre de Chambre de Lausanne for Haydn: Orlando Paladino; Carlo Maria Giulini (conductor), Chicago Symphony for Mahler: Symphony No. 9 in D major; Georg Solti (conductor), Chicago Symphony for Ravel: Bolero; Debussy: La Mer and l'Aprés-Midi d'un Faune; John de Main (conductor), Houston Grand Opera Production for Gershwin: Porgy and Bess	
1979	Christopher Bishop (producer), Carlo Maria Giulini (conductor), Chicago Symphony	Brahms: Concerto for Violin in D major	Carlo Maria Giulini (conductor), Chicago Symphony for Dvořák: Symphony No. 9 in E minor (New World); Claudio Abbado (conductor), Vienna Philharmonic for Mahler: Symphony No. 4 in G major; Colin Davis (conductor), Boston Symphony for Sibelius: Symphonies (Complete); Herbert von Karajan (conductor), Berlin Philharmonic for Beethoven: Symphonyies (9) (Complete); John Frandsen (conductor), Danish Radio Symphony Orchestra and Chorus for Nielsen: Maskarade; Neville Marriner (conductor), Academy of St. Martin-in-the-Fields for Bach: Mass in B minor; Vladimir Horowitz (conductor), Eugene Ormandy, New York Philharmonic for Rachmaninoff: Concerto No. 3 in D minor for Piano – Horowitz Golden Jubilee	
1980	James Mallinson (producer), Georg Solti (conductor), Chicago Symphony Orchestra	Brahms: Symphonies (Complete)	Vladimir Horowitz for The Horowitz Concerto '78/79; Colin Davis (conductor), Royal Opera House Orchestra and Chorus, Covent Garden for Britten: Peter Grimes; Mstislav Rostropovich (conductor), London Philharmonic for Shostakovich: Lady Macbeth of Mtsensk; Pierre Boulez (conductor), London Symphony Orchestra, Frankfurt Radio Orchestra, Juilliard String Quartet for Webern: The Complete Works of Anton Webern, Vol. 1; Riccardo Muti (conductor), Philadelphia Orchestra for Mussorgsky/Ravel: Pictures at an Exhibition; Stravinsky: The Firebird Suite	
1981	Gunther Breest, Michael Horwath (producers), Pierre Boulez (conductor), Orchestre de l'Opera de Paris	Berg: Lulu	Georg Solti (conductor), Chicago Symphony for Bruckner: Symphony No. 6 in A major; Michael Tilson Thomas (conductor), Buffalo Philharmonic for Ruggles: Complete Music; Seiji Ozawa (conductor), Boston Symphony for Berg: Concerto for Violin and Orchestra; Stravinsky: Concerto in D major for Violin and Orchestra; Zubin Mehta (conductor), Los Angeles Philharmonic for Bartók: Concerto for Violin and Orchestra	
1982	James Mallinson (producer), Georg Solti (conductor), Chicago Symphony Orchestra and Chorus	Mahler: Symphony No. 2 in C minor	Teresa Stratas for The Unknown Kurt Weill; Richard Bonynge (conductor), New York City Opera Orchestra for Live from Lincoln Center, Sutherland, Horne, Pavarotti; Vladimir Horowitz for The Horowitz Concerts '79/80; Zubin Mehta (conductor), New York Philharmonic for Isaac Stern 60th Anniversary Celebration	
1983	Samuel H. Carter (producer), Glenn Gould	Bach: Goldberg Variations	Georg Solti (conductor), Chicago Symphony Orchestra and Chorus for Berlioz: La Damnation de Faust; Igor Stravinsky, Robert Craft (conductors), various Orchestras for Stravinsky: The Recorded Legacy; James Levine (conductor), Chicago Symphony for Mahler: Symphony No. 7 in E minor (Song of the Night); Leonard Slatkin (conductor), St. Louis Symphony for Debussy: La Mer; Prelude a l'Apres-Midi d'un Faune; Danses Sacrée et Profane	
1984	James Mallinson (producer), Georg Solti (conductor), Chicago Symphony	Mahler: Symphony No. 9 in D major	Carlo Maria Giulini (conductor), Los Angeles Philharmonic, Los Angeles Master Chorale for Verdi: Falstaff; James Levine (conductor), Metropolitan Opera Orchestra for Leontyne Price and Marilyn Horne in Concert at the Met; Raymond Leppard (conductor), National Philharmonic Orchestra for Haydn: Concerto for Trumpet and Orchestra in E-flat major; Mozart: Concerto for Trumpet and Orchestra in D major; Hummel: Concerto for Trumpet and Orchestra in E-flat major; Zubin Mehta (conductor), Israel Philharmonic Orchestra for Vivaldi: The Four Seasons and Concerto for 4 Violins, Op. 3, No. 10; Bach: Double Concerto, BWV 1043; Mozart: Sinfonia Concertante, K. 364	
1985	John Strauss (producer), Neville Marriner (conductor), Academy of St. Martin-in-the-Fields, Ambrosian Opera Chorus, Choristers of Westminster Abbey	Amadeus (Soundtrack)	James Levine (conductor), Chicago Symphony for Beethoven: The 5 Piano Concertos; James Levine (conductor), Chicago Symphony Orchestra and Chorus for Brahms: A German Requiem; Leonard Slatkin (conductor), St. Louis Symphony for Prokofiev: Symphony No. 5 in B-flat, Op. 100; Raymond Leppard (conductor), English Chamber Orchestra, Wynton Marsalis, Edita Gruberova for Wynton Marsalis, Edita Gruberova: Handel, Purcell, Torelli, Fasch, Molter	
1986	Robert Woods (producer), Robert Shaw (conductor), Atlanta Symphony Orchestra and Chorus	Berlioz: Requiem	Itzhak Perlman, Daniel Barenboim for Mozart: Violin and Piano Sonatas K. 926, 305, 306; Claudio Abbado (conductor), Chicago Symphony Orchestra for Mahler: Symphony No. 7 in E minor; James Levine (conductor), Chicago Symphony Orchestra for Dvořák: Symphony No. 7 in D minor; Leonard Slatkin (conductor), St. Louis Symphony Orchestra for Prokofiev: Cinderella (Suite); Louis Lane (conductor), Atlanta Symphony Orchestra for Respighi: Pines of Rome; The Birds; Fountains of Rome; Michael Tilson Thomas (conductor), Los Angeles Philharmonic Orchestra for Gershwin: Rhapsody in Blue; Second Rhapsody for Orchestra with piano; Prelude for Piano; Short Story; Violin Piece; For Lily Pons; Sleepless Night; Promenade; Robert Shaw (conductor), Atlanta Symphony Orchestra for Berlioz: Les Nuits d'Été; Fauré: Pelleas et Melisande; Robert Shaw (conductor), Atlanta Symphony Orchestra and Chorus for Handel: Messiah	
1987	Thomas Frost (producer), Vladimir Horowitz	Horowitz: The Studio Recordings, New York '85	Georg Solti (conductor), Chicago Symphony Orchestra for Mendelssohn: Symphonies No. 3 in A minor (Scottish) and No. 4 in A (Italian); John Manuceri (conductor), New York City Opera Chorus and Orchestra for Bernstein: Candide; Kathleen Battle, Christopher Parkening for Pleasures of Their Company (Bach, Gounod, Villa-Lobos; Leonard Slatkin (conductor), St. Louis Symphony Orchestra for Copland: Billy the Kid and Rodeo (Complete Ballets); Robert Shaw (conductor), Atlanta Symphony Orchestra and Chorus for Beethoven: Symphony No. 9 in D minor; Yo-Yo Ma, Emanuel Ax for Beethoven: Cello and Piano Sonata No. 4 in C and Variations	
1988	Thomas Frost (producer), Vladimir Horowitz	Horowitz in Moscow	Edo de Waart (conductor), San Francisco Symphony for Adams: The Chairman Dances; Christmas Zeal and Activity; 2 Fanfares for Orchestra; Tromba Iontana; Short Ride in a Fast Machine; Common Tropes in Simple Time; Georg Solti (conductor), Chicago Symphony Orchestra for Beethoven: Symphony No. 9 in D minor (Choral); Leonard Slatkin (conductor), St. Louis Symphony for Hanson: Symphony No. 2 (Romantic); Barber: Violin Concerto; Robert Shaw (conductor), Atlanta Symphony Orchestra and Chorus for Fauré: Requiem, Op. 48; Duruflé: Requiem, Op. 9	
1989	Robert Woods (producer), Robert Shaw (conductor), Atlanta Symphony Orchestra and Chorus	Verdi: Requiem and Operatic Choruses	Georg Solti (conductor), Vienna State Opera Choir, Vienna Philharmonic for Wagner: Lohengrin; Leonard Bernstein (conductor), New York Philharmonic for Mahler: Symphony No. 2 in C minor (Resurrection); Robert Shaw, Louis Lane (conductors), Atlanta Symphony Orchestra for Rorem: String Symphony; Sunday Morning; Eagles; Vladimir Horowitz, Carlo Maria Giulini, La Scala Opera Orchestra for Horowitz Plays Mozart	
1990	Wolf Erichson (producer), Emerson String Quartet	Bartók: 6 String Quartets	Herbert von Karajan (conductor), Vienna Philharmonic for Bruckner: Symphony No. 8 in C minor; Christoph von Dahnanyi (conductor), Cleveland Orchestra for Busoni: Piano Concerto in C (With Male Chorus); Gerard Schwarz (conductor), Seattle Symphony for Hanson: Symphonies Nos. 1 in E minor 'Nordic' and 2 'Romantic'; Elegy in Memory of Serge Koussevitsky; James Levine (conductor), Metripolitan Opera Orchestra for Wagner: Die Walkuere	
1991	Hans Weber (producer), Leonard Bernstein (conductor), New York Philharmonic	Ives: Symphony No. 2; The Gong on the Hook and Ladder; Central Park in the Dark; The Unanswered Question	John Adams (conductor), Sanford Sylvan for Adams: Fearful Symmetries; The Wound-Dresser; Christopher Raeburn (producer), Zubin Mehta (conductor), José Carreras, Placido Domingo, Luciano Pavarotti for Carreras, Domingo, Pavarotti in Concert; Adam Stern (producer), Gerard Schwarz (conductor), Carol Rosenberger for Hanson: Symphonies Nos. 3 & 6; Fantasy Variations on a Theme of Youth; Thomas Frost (producer), Vladimir Horowitz for The Last Recording (Chopin, Haydn, Liszt, Wagner); Robert Woods (producer), Robert Shaw, (conductor) for Rachmaninoff: Vespers	
1992	Hans Weber (producer), Leonard Bernstein (conductor), Kurt Ollmann, June Anderson, Nicolai Gedda, Adolph Green, Jerry Hadley, Della Jones, Christa Ludwig, London Symphony Orchestra	Bernstein: Candide	Jay David Saks, (producer), Leonard Slatkin (conductor), St. Louis Symphony, John Browning for Barber: Symphony No. 1, Op. 9; Piano Concerto, Op. 38; Souvenirs, Op. 28; Gary Schultz (producer), Christopher Oldfather, Juilliard String Quartet for Carter: The Four String Quartets; Duo for Violin & Piano; James Mallinson, John Corigliano (producers), Daniel Barenboim (conductor), Chicago Symphony for Corigliano: Symphony No. 1; Adam Stern (producer), Gerard Schwarz (conductor), Seattle Symphony, New York Chamber Symphony for Hanson: Symphony No. 4, Op. 34; Serenade, Op. 35; Lament for Beowulf, Op. 25; Pastorale, Op. 38; Merry Mount Serenade, Op. 35; Steven Epstein (producer), Michael Tilson Thomas, (conductor), Chicago Symphony for Ives: Symphonies Nos. 1 & 4; Hymns	
1993	Horst Dittberner (producer), Leonard Bernstein (conductor), Berlin Philharmonic Orchestra	Mahler: Symphony No. 9	Nicholas Harnoncourt (conductor), Chamber Orchestra of Europe for Beethoven: Symphony (Complete); Ion Marin (conductor), Orchestra e Coro del Teatro la Fenice for Cecilia Bartoli: Rossini Heroines; David Zinman (conductor), London Sinfonietta for Górecki: Symphony No. 3; Georg Solti, (conductor), Vienna Philharmonic for Strauss: Die Frau Ohne Schatten	
1994	Karl-August Naegler (producer), Pierre Boulez (conductor), Chicago Symphony Orchestra, John Aler, John Tomlinson	Bartók: The Wooden Prince and Cantata Profana	Christopher Alder (producer), James Levine (conductor), Chicago Symphony Orchestra, Anne-Sophie Mutter for Berg: Violin Concerto and Time Chant; Andreas Neubronner (producer), Michael Tilson Thomas (conductor), London Symphony for Debussy: Le Martyre de Saint Sebastien; Christopher Raeburn (producer), Cecilia Bartoli, Gyorgy Fischer for If You Love Me; Ben Turner (producer), Paul McCreesh (conductor), Gabrieli Consort and Players for Venetian Vespers	
1995	Karl-August Naegler (producer), Pierre Boulez (conductor), Chicago Symphony Orchestra	Bartók: Concerto for Orchestra; Four Orchestral Pieces, Op. 12	Wolfgang Mitlehner, Max Wilcox (producers), Thomas Hampson, Cheryl Studer for Barber: Secrets of the Old – The Complete Songs; Christian Gansch, Werner Mayer (producers), André Previn (conductor), Gil Shaham for Barber: Violin Concerto/Korngold: Violin Concerto, etc.; Helmut Burk (producer), Krystian Zimerman for Debussy: Preludes (Books I & II); Andrew Cornall (producer), Herbert Blomstedt (conductor), San Francisco Symphony Orchestra for Mahler: Symphony No. 2	
1996	Karl-August Naegler (producer), Pierre Boulez (conductor), Cleveland Orchestra & Chorus	Debussy: La Mer; Nocturnes; Jeux Etc.	Pierre Boulez (conductor), Chicago Symphony Orchestra for Bartók: Divertimento; Dance Suite; Etc.; Charles Dutoit (conductor), Montréal Symphony Orchestra for Berlioz: Les Troyens; Martin Neary (conductor), London Consort, Westminster Abbey Choir for Music for Queen Mary; Mstislav Rostropovich (conductor), Maxim Vengerov, London Symphony Orchestra for Prokofiev/Shostakovich: Violin Concertos No. 1	
1997	Joanna Nickrenz (producer), Leonard Slatkin (conductor), Michelle de Young, Washington Oratorio Society Male Chorus, National Symphony Orchestra	Corigliano: Of Rage and Remembrance	Pierre Boulez (conductor) for Bartók: The Miraculous Mandarin; Music for Strings, Percussion and Celesta; Esa-Pekka Salonen (conductor) for Bartók: The Three Piano Concertos; Leonard Slatkin (conductor) for Copland: Dance Symphony; Short Symphony; Organ Symphony; James Levine (conductor) for Opera Arias (Works of Mozart, Wagner, Borodin, Etc.); André Previn (conductor) for Prokofiev: Violin Concertos Nos. 1 & 2; Sonata for Solo Violin	
1998	Steven Epstein (producer), David Zinman (conductor), Yo-Yo Ma, Philadelphia Orchestra	Premieres – Cello Concertos (Works of Danielpour, Kirchner, Rouse)	Max Wilcox (producer), Emerson String Quartet for Beethoven: The String Quartets; Helmut Burk (producer), Pierre Boulez (conductor), Cleveland Orchestra for Berlioz: Symphonie Fantastique; Tristia; James Mallinson (producer), Charles Mackerras, Scottish Chamber Orchestra & Choir for Brahms: The Four Symphonies; Academic Festival Overture, Etc.; Michael Woolcock (producer), Georg Solti (conductor), Ben Heppner, Herbert Lippert, Karita Mattila, Alan Opie, Rene Pape, Jose van Dam, Iris Vermillion, Chicago Symphony Orchestra & Choir for Wagner: Die Meistersinger von Nurnberg	
1999	James Mallinson (producer), Robert Shaw (conductor), Atlanta Symphony Orchestra & Choir	Barber: Prayers of Kierkegaard/Vaughan Williams: Dona Nobis Pacem/Bartók: Cantata Profana	Karl-August Naegler (producer), Pierre Boulez (conductor), Jessye Norman, Laszlo Polgar, Chicago Symphony Orchestra for Bartók: Bluebeard's Castle; Michael Haas (producer), Jeffrey Tate (conductor), Renee Fleming, English Chamber Orchestra for The Beautiful Voice (Works of Charpentier, Gounod, Massent, Flotow, Etc.); Judith Sherman (producer), Kronos Quartet for Schnittke: The Complete String Quartets; Chris Hazell (producer), Georg Solti (conductor), Tamas Bubno, Kalman Strausz, Gabriella Thesz for Sir Georg Solti – The Last Recording	
2000	Andreas Neubronner (producer), Michael Tilson Thomas (conductor), Ragazzi Boys' Choir, San Francisco Girl's Chorus, San Francisco Symphony & Chorus	Stravinsky: The Firebird; The Rite of Spring; Perséphone	Christian Gansch (producer), Pierre Boulez (conductor), Gil Shaham, Chicago Symphony Orchestra for Bartók: Violin Concerto No. 2; Rhapsodies Nos. 1 & 2; Ulrich Vette (producer), Anne-Sophie Mutter, Lambert Orkis for Beethoven: The Violin Sonatas; Robert Woods (producer), Robert Shaw (conductor), Atlanta Symphony Orchestra for Dvořák: Stabat Mater; Chris Hazell (producer), Ulf Schirmer (conductor), various artists, Danish National Radio Symphony Orchestra & Chorus for Nielsen: Maskarade	
2001	Da-Hong Seetoo, Max Wilcox (producers), Emerson String Quartet	Shostakovich: The String Quartets	Andreas Neubronner (producer), Murray Perahia for Bach: The Goldberg Variations; Jay David Saks (producer), Evgeny Kissin for Chopin: 24 Preludes, Op. 28; Sonata No. 2, Op. 35; Polonaise, Op. 53; Tony Harrison (producer), Leif Ove Andsnes (conductor), Norwegian Chamber Orchestra for Haydn: Piano Concertos Nos. 3, 4 & 11; Stephen Johns (producer), Simon Rattle for Mahler: Symphony No. 10	
2002	James Mallinson (producer), Simon Rhodes (engineer), Colin Davis (conductor), Michelle DeYoung, Ben Heppner, Petra Lang, Peter Mattei, Stephen Milling, Sara Mingardo, Kenneth Tarver, London Symphony Orchestra	Berlioz: Les Troyens	Helmut Burk, Karl-August Maegler (producers), Pierre Boulez, Chicago Symphony Orchestra for Boulez Conducts Varèse; Petr Vít (producer), Charles Mackerras, Jaroslav Brezina, Ivan Kusnjer, Peter Straka, Eva Urbanova, Czech Philharmonic Orchestra for Janáček: Sarka; Wilhelm Hellweg (producer), Pierre Boulez (conductor), Mitsuko Uchida, Cleveland Orchestra for Schoenberg: Piano Concerto, Etc.; Berg: Sonata, Op. 1; Webern: Variations, Op. 27; Brian Couzens (producer), Richard Hickox, London Symphony Orchestra for Vaughan Williams: A London Symphony	
2003	Thomas Moore (producer), Michael J. Bishop (engineer), Robert Spano (conductor), Norman Mackenzie, Christine Goerke, Brett Polegato, Atlanta Symphony Orchestra & Chorus	Vaughan Williams: A Sea Symphony (Symphony No. 1)	Andrew Keener, (producer), Takács Quartet for Beethoven: String Quartets; Erik Smith (producer), Patrick Summers (conductor), Renee Fleming for Bel Canto (Bellini, Donizetti, Rossini, Etc.); Andreas Neubronner (producer), Michael Tilson Thomas (conductor), San Francisco Symphony for Mahler: Symphony No. 6; Manfred Eicher (producer), Tőnu Kaljuste (conductor), Swedish Radio Symphony Orchestra & Chorus for Pärt: Orient & Occident	
2004	Andreas Neubronner (producer), Michael Tilson Thomas (conductor), Michelle DeYoung, San Francisco Symphony	Mahler: Symphony No. 3; Kindertotenlieder	John Fraser, (producer), Mstislav Rostropovich (conductor), Maxim Vengerov, London Symphony Orchestra for Britten: Violin Concerto/Walton: Viola Concerto; Christian Gansch (producer), Pierre Boulez (conductor), Anne Sofie von Otter, Vienna Philharmonic for Mahler: Symphony No. 3; Nick Parker, Phil Rowlands (producers), José Serebrier (conductor) for Rorem: Three Symphonies; George Blood, Simon Woods (producers), Wolfgang Sawallisch (conductor), Philadelphia Orchestra, various artists for Schumann: Symphonies 1-4; Manfred Overture, Etc.	
2005	John Adams, Lawrence Rock, Richard Elkind (producers), Lorin Maazel (conductor), Brooklyn Youth Chorus, New York Choral Artists, New York Philharmonic	Adams: On the Transmigration of Souls	James Mallinson, (producer), Colin Davis (conductor), Jonathan Lemalu, Anthony Michaels-Moore, James Rutherford, Janice Watson, Glenn Winslade, London Symphony Orchestra & Chorus for Britten: Peter Grimes; Peter Newble (producer), Kenneth Schermerhorn (conductor), Mark Wait, Nashville Symphony for Carter: Symphony No. 1; Piano Concert; Holiday Overture; Elaine Martone (producer), Robert Spano (conductor) for Higdon: City Scape; Concerto for Orchestra; Martin Sauer (producer), René Jacobs (conductor), Concerto Köln, various artists for Mozart: Le Nozze Di Figaro	
2006	Tim Handley (producer), Leonard Slatkin (conductor), Jerry Blackstone, William Hammer, Jason Harris, Christopher Kiver, Carole Ott, Mary Alice Stollak (choir directors), Christine Brewer, Joan Morris, University of Michigan School of Music Symphony Orchestra	Bolcom: Songs of Innocence and of Experience	Jan Karlin, Matthew Snyder (producers), Jeff von der Schmidt (conductor), Southwest Chamber Music & Tambuco Percussion Ensemble for Chávez: Complete Chamber Music, Vol. 3; Ulrich Ruscher (producer), Martha Argerich for Martha Argerich and Friends: Live from the Lugano Festival; Da-Hong Seetoo (producer), Emerson String Quartet for Mendelssohn: The Complete String Quartets; Wilhelm Meister (producer), Mariss Jansons (conductor), Sergei Aleksashkin, Chor & Symphonieorchester des Bayerischen Rundfunks for Shostakovich: Symphony No. 13	
2007	Andreas Neubronner (producer), Michael Tilson Thomas (conductor), San Francisco Symphony	Mahler: Symphony No. 7	James Mallinson (producers), Bernard Haitink (conductor), London Symphony Orchestra for Beethoven: Symphonies Nos. 1-9; David Starobin (producer), various artists, Odense Symphony Orchestra for Lieberson: Rilke Songs; The Six Realms; Horn Concerto; Ulrich Ruscher (producer), Martha Argerich and Friends for Martha Argerich and Friends: Live from the Lugano Festival 2005; Martin Sauer (producer), René Jacobs (conductor), various artists for Mozart: La Clemenza di Tito	
2008	Tim Handley (producer), Leonard Slatkin (conductor), Nashville Symphony	Tower: Made in America	Wilhelm Meister (producer), Riccardo Muti (conductor), Symphonieorchester des Bayerischen Rundfunks, various artists for Cherubini: Missa Solemnis in E; Blanton Alspaugh (producer), Charles Bruffy (conductor), Kansas City Chorale, Phoenix Bach Choir for Grechaninov: Passion Week; David Frost (producer), Renee Fleming, Valeru Gergiev, Orchestra of the Mariinsky Theatre for Homage: The Age of the Diva; Dirk Sobotka (producer), Lorraine Hunt Lieberson, James Levine, Boston Symphony Orchestra for Lorraine Hunt Liberson Sings Peter Lieberson: Neruda Songs	
2009	Fred Vogler (producer), James Conlon (conductor), Anthony Dean Griffey, Patti LuPone, Audra McDonald, various artists, Los Angeles Opera Orchestra and Chorus	Weill: Rise and Fall of the City of Mahagonny	Christopher Raeburn (producer), Wolf-Dieter Karwatky, Philip Siney (engineers), Cecilia Bartoli, Adam Fischer, Orchestra la Scintilla for Maria; Blanton Alspaugh (producer), John Newton, Mark Donahue (engineer), Craig Hella Johnson (conductor), Company of Strings, Company of Voices & Conspirare for O'Regan, Tarik: Threshold of Night; Sid McLauchlan, Arend Prohmann (producers), Stphan Flock (engineer), Esa-Pekka Salonen (conductor), Hilary Hahn, Swedish Radio Symphony Orchestra for Schoenberg/Sibelius: Violin Concertos; Blanton Alspaugh (producer), John Newton, Jonathan Cooper (engineers), Phoenix Chorale for Spotless Rose: Hymns to the Virgin Mary	
2010	Andreas Neubronner (producer), Peter Laenger, Andreas Neubronner, (engineers), Michael Tilson Thomas (conductor), Ragnar Bohlin, Kevin Fox, Susan McMane (choir directors), various artists, San Francisco Symphony & Chorus	Mahler: Symphony No. 8; Adagio from Symphony No. 10	Steven Epstein (producer), Richard King (engineer), Marin Alsop (conductor), various artists, Baltimore Symphony Orchestra for Bernstein: Mass; Elizabeth Ostrow (producer), Jesse Lewis, John Newton, Mark Donahue (engineers), James Levine (conductor), Boston Symphony Orchestra, Tanglewood Festival Chorus for Ravel: Daphin et Chloé; Blanton Alspaugh (producer), Mark Donahue, John Hill (engineers), Alastair Willis (conductor), Julie Boulianne, Nashville Symphony, various artists for Ravel: L'Enfant et les Sortilèges; James Mallinson (producer), John Newton, Dirk Sobtka, Mark Donahue (engineers), Andrei Popov, Sergei Semishkur, Vladislav Sulimsky, Orchestra and Chorus of the Mariinsky Theatre for Shostakovich: The Nose	
2011	Christopher Alder (producer), Tom Lazarus, Christopher Willis, Silas Brown (engineers), Riccardo Muti (conductor), Duain Wolfe (chorus master), Chicago Symphony Orchestra, Chicago Symphony Chorus, various artists	Verdi: Requiem	Everett Porter (producer), Everett Porter (engineer), Mariss Jansons (conductor), Royal Concertgebouw Orchestra for Bruckner: Symphonies Nos. 3 & 4; Blanton Alspaugh (producer), Mark Donahue, John Hill, Dirk Sobotka (engineers), Giancarlo Guerrero (conductor), Terrence Wilson, Nashville Symphony for Daugherty: Metropolis Symphony; Deus Ex Machina; David Frost (producer), David Frost, Tom Lazarus, Steven Mackey, Dirk Sobotka, Silas Brown (engineers), Gil Rose (conductor), Rinde Eckert, Catch Electric Guitar Quartet, Boston Modern Orchestra Project for Mackey, Steven: Dreamhouse; Arend Prohmann (producer), Giovanni Antonini, Philip Siney (engineer), Il Giardino Armonico for Sacrificum	
