= Peter Mattei =

Swedish operatic baritone (born 1965)

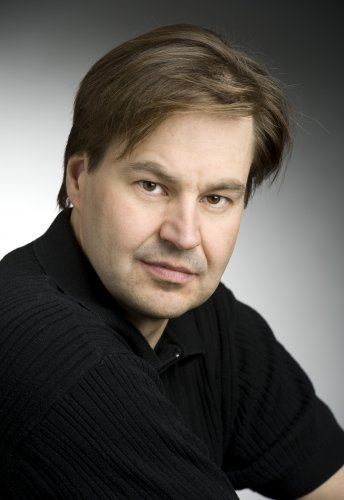
Peter Mattei, 2012. Photo: Håkan Flank.

Peter Mattei (born 3 June 1965 in Piteå) is a Swedish operatic baritone who has won acclaim internationally in a wide variety of roles.

== Biography ==
Mattei studied at the Royal Swedish Academy of Music, and debuted in Mozart's La finta giardiniera as Nardo at the Drottningholm Palace Theatre in Stockholm in 1990. In 1993 Mattei starred as Pentheus in the Ingmar Bergman's TV-film Backanterna. He sang the title role in Mozart's Don Giovanni for the first time at the Gothenburg Opera in the 1994–95 season. In the same season, he performed as Figaro in Mozart's Le Nozze di Figaro.

Mattei made his international debut as Don Giovanni at the Scottish Opera in Glasgow, Scotland. He was then invited to the Théâtre Royal de la Monnaie, Brussels, Belgium and to the Aix-en-Provence Festival, France. His first appearance at the Salzburg Festival was in Beethoven's Fidelio, singing Don Fernando, conducted by Sir Georg Solti in 1996. Claudio Abbado selected him as the bass soloist in Bach's St. Matthew Passion with the Berlin Philharmonic Orchestra. In 2002, Peter Mattei made his first appearance at the Metropolitan Opera, as Count Almaviva in Le Nozze di Figaro. This role has been followed by the title role in Don Giovanni in 2003, Figaro in Rossini's The Barber of Seville in 2006, Wolfram in Wagner's Tannhaüser in 2015, Amfortas in Wagner's Parsifal in 2018, and the title role in Berg's Wozzeck in 2019-2020. With Don Giovanni he also made a very successful debut at La Scala in Milan, opening the 2011–2012 season.

== Personal life ==
Mattei lives in Bromma, Sweden. He is married and has two daughters. Mattei can also play the piano, the accordion and the double bass.

== Awards ==
- 2002: received 44th Annual Grammy Awards for participation in the album Berlioz: Les Troyens in two categories: Best Classical Album and Best Opera Recording
- 2006: appointed Hovsångare by H.M. the King of Sweden

== Selected recordings ==
- Berlioz, Les Troyens, Ben Heppner, Peter Mattei, Tigran Martirossian, Stephen Milling, Kenneth Tarver, Toby Spence, Isabelle Cals, Petra Lang, Michelle DeYoung, Sara Mingardo, London Symphony Orchestra, London Symphony chorus, conducted by Colin Davis (Recorded live at the Barbican Hall, December). 4 CD: LSO Live, Cat: LSO0010 (2000)

== Sources ==
- Fredén, Jonas, "Peter Mattei puts Luleå on the musical map", Swedish Institute, 9 January 2009. Accessed 30 October 2009.
- Metropolitan Opera, Mattei, Peter (Baritone), performance record on the MetOpera Database. Accessed 30 October 2009.
- Wasserman, Adam, "Midnight Son" (cover story), Opera News, November 2006, vol 71, no. 5. Accessed 30 October 2009.
