= Sara Mingardo =

Italian classical contralto (born 1961)

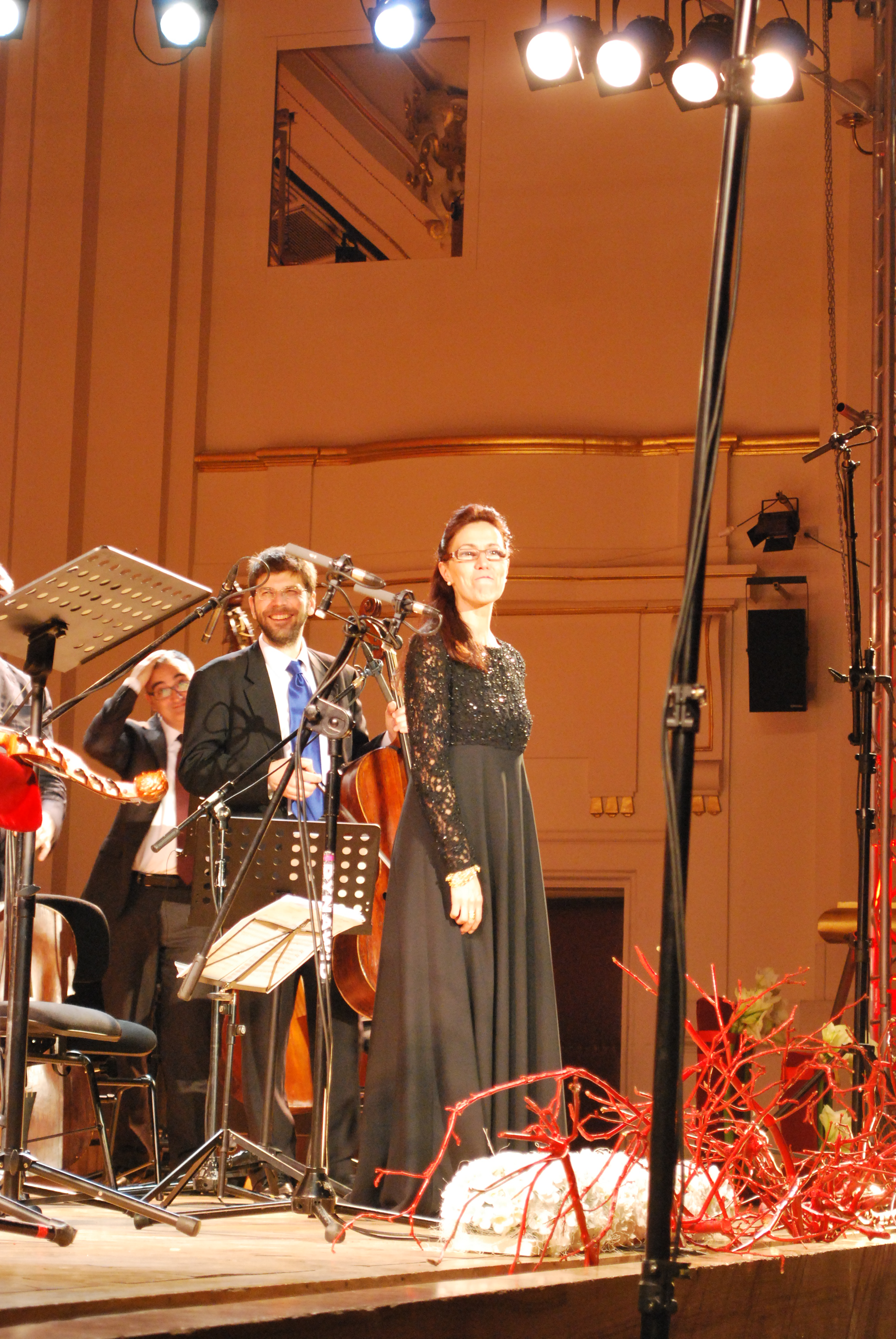
Sara Mingardo

Sara Mingardo (born 2 March 1961) is an Italian classical contralto who has had an active international career in concerts and operas since the 1980s. Her complete recording of Anna in Hector Berlioz's Les Troyens won a Gramophone Award and both the Grammy Award for Best Opera Recording and the Grammy Award for Best Classical Album in 2002. Some of the other roles she has performed on stage or on disc include Andronico in Tamerlano, Mistress Quickly in Falstaff, Rosina in The Barber of Seville, and the title roles in Carmen, Giulio Cesare, Riccardo Primo, and Rinaldo. She has also recorded several Vivaldi cantatas, Bach cantatas, and such concert works as Mozart's Requiem, Rossini's Stabat Mater, and Vivaldi's Gloria among others.

== Life and career ==
Born in Venice, Mingardo studied singing with Paolo Ghitti in her native city at the Conservatorio di Musica Benedetto Marcello di Venezia. She won first prize at the Toti dal Monte international singing competition and the Prize Giulietta Simionato at the 23rd Vienna Competition. She made her professional opera debut in 1987 as Fidalma in Domenico Cimarosa's Il matrimonio segreto in Avezzano. Her career developed rapidly, and by 1989 she had already made appearances at La Scala, La Fenice, the Salzburg Festival, the Teatro Regio di Torino, and the Teatro di San Carlo among other major theatres.

Mingardo has since maintained a busy singing schedule. Her performance credits include appearances at the Aix-en-Provence Festival, the Bregenzer Festspiele, Carnegie Hall, the Festival de Beaune, the Festival della Valle d'Itria, the Grand Théâtre de Genève, La Monnaie, the Liceu, the Montreux-Vevey Festival, the Lausanne Opera, the Opéra de Monte-Carlo, the Opéra national de Montpellier, the Santa Fe Opera, the Schwetzingen Festival, the Semperoper, the Théâtre des Champs-Élysées, the Teatro Comunale di Bologna, the Teatro Comunale Florence, the Teatro de la Zarzuela, the Teatro Lirico di Cagliari the Teatro Massimo, the Teatro Lirico Giuseppe Verdi, and the Teatro Real among others. She has also sung with many notable orchestras in concert, including the Berlin Philharmonic, the Boston Symphony Orchestra, and the London Symphony Orchestra.

== Discography ==
- G. F. Handel - Aci, Galatea e Polifemo - (Serenata a tre) - Teatro Carignano Torino - Antonio Florio (conductor) - Davide Livermore (Stage director)
  Cast: Sara Mingardo (Galatea), Antonio Abete (Polifemo), Ruth Rosique (Aci) - 2009, Live video recording on DVD - Dynamic
- G. F. Handel - Il Trionfo del Tempo e del Disinganno, HWV46a - Emmanuelle Haïm (conductor) - Krzysztof Warlikowski (Stage director)
  Cast: Sabine Devieilhe (Bellezza), Franco Fagioli (Piacere), Sara Mingardo (Disinganno), Michael Spyres (Tempo) with the participation of Christine Angot Le Concert d’Astrée - 2017, Live video recording on DVD - Erato
- Stabat Mater settings by Alessandro Scarlatti and Pergolesi; Concerto Italiano, Rinaldo Alessandrini (Naïve).
- Handel, Vivaldi, Monteverdi; Concerto Italiano, Rinaldo Alessandrini (Naïve).
- Rossini: Petite Messe Solennelle; conducted by Antonio Pappano (EMI).
- Berlioz, Les Troyens, Ben Heppner, Peter Mattei, Tigran Martirossian, Stephen Milling, Kenneth Tarver, Toby Spence, Isabelle Cals, Petra Lang, Michelle DeYoung, Sara Mingardo, London Symphony Orchestra, London Symphony chorus, conducted by Colin Davis(Recorded live at the Barbican Hall, December). 4 CD: LSO Live, Cat: LSO0010 (2000)

== Sources ==
- Sara Mingardo at Stage Door (agency page)
- Sara Mingardo at www.bach-cantatas.com
