= Petra Lang =

German opera singer (born 1962)

- Born: 29 November 1962 (age 63); Frankfurt am Main, Germany
- Education: Peter Cornelius Conservatory
- Occupations: Classical mezzo-soprano; Classical soprano

Petra Lang (born 29 November 1962) is a German opera singer. Beginning as a mezzo-soprano, from 2012 a soprano, she is known for her interpretation of music by Richard Wagner and Gustav Mahler. She made an international career in both opera and concert. She has performed at the Bayreuth Festival from 2005, singing the title role of Isolde in 2016.

== Career ==
Born in Frankfurt am Main, Lang first studied the violin. She then studied voice with Gertie Charlent at the Akademie für Tonkunst in Darmstadt and at the Peter Cornelius Conservatory in Mainz. She also attended the Opernstudio of the Bavarian State Opera, and took master classes with Hans Hotter, Dietrich Fischer-Dieskau, Brigitte Fassbaender and Peter Schreier.

She was a member of the Theater Basel from 1990, and from 1992 to 1995 worked at the Theater Dortmund, where she learned many lyrical mezzo-soprano parts. She appeared as Tamiri in Mozart's Il re pastore at the Nederlandse Opera Amsterdam, as Virtu in Monteverdi's L'incoronazione di Poppea at the Salzburg Festival, as Fenena in Verdi's Nabucco at the Bregenz Festival and as Flora in Verdi's La traviata at the Zurich Festival.

She turned to the works of Wagner in the 1994/95 season, performing Fricka and Waltraute in the Dortmund Ring cycle. From 1995 to 1997 at the Staatstheater Braunschweig, she appeared as Brangäne in Wagner's Tristan und Isolde, Judith in Bartok's Herzog Blaubarts Burg, Marie in Alban Berg's Wozzeck and Eboli in Verdi's Don Carlos. She changed to singing soprano in 2012.

She was awarded two Grammy Awards in 2002 for singing Cassandre in Les Troyens by Berlioz in a 2000 live recording of the London Symphony Orchestra conducted by Colin Davis.

=== Bayreuth ===
Lang performed at the Bayreuth Festival first in 2005 the part of Brangäne in Tristan und Isolde. In 2011 she appeared as Ortrud in Lohengrin, staged by Hans Neuenfels. In 2016, she took over the role of Isolde in the production by Katharina Wagner conducted by Christian Thielemann. A reviewer noted her "floating dark cantilenas" ("mit schwebenden, dunklen Kantilenen"). Eleonore Büning wrote in the Frankfurter Allgemeine Zeitung that she, as the young Irish bride delivered to Marke, expresses her desperation forcefully (headline: "Wie wuchtig die junge Braut ihre Verzweiflung herausschleudert!").

=== Concert ===
Lang recorded alto parts in Advent cantatas by Johann Sebastian Bach with John Eliot Gardiner in 1992. She sang the solo in Mahler's Third Symphony at the Royal Festival Hall on 12 December 2007 with the London Philharmonic Choir and Orchestra, conducted by Gennadi Rozhdestvensky. A review noted her "haunting, intense, totally engrossing 'O Mensch, gib Acht!'", with "immaculate phrasing". She performed the work again in Freiburg with the SWR Orchestra in 2016.

== Selected recordings ==
- Berlioz, Les Troyens, Ben Heppner, Peter Mattei, Tigran Martirossian, Stephen Milling, Kenneth Tarver, Toby Spence, Isabelle Cals, Petra Lang, Michelle DeYoung, Sara Mingardo, London Symphony Orchestra, London Symphony chorus, conducted by Colin Davis (Recorded live at the Barbican Hall, December). 4 CD: LSO Live, Cat: LSO0010 (2000)
