= Michelle DeYoung =

American opera singer (born 1968)

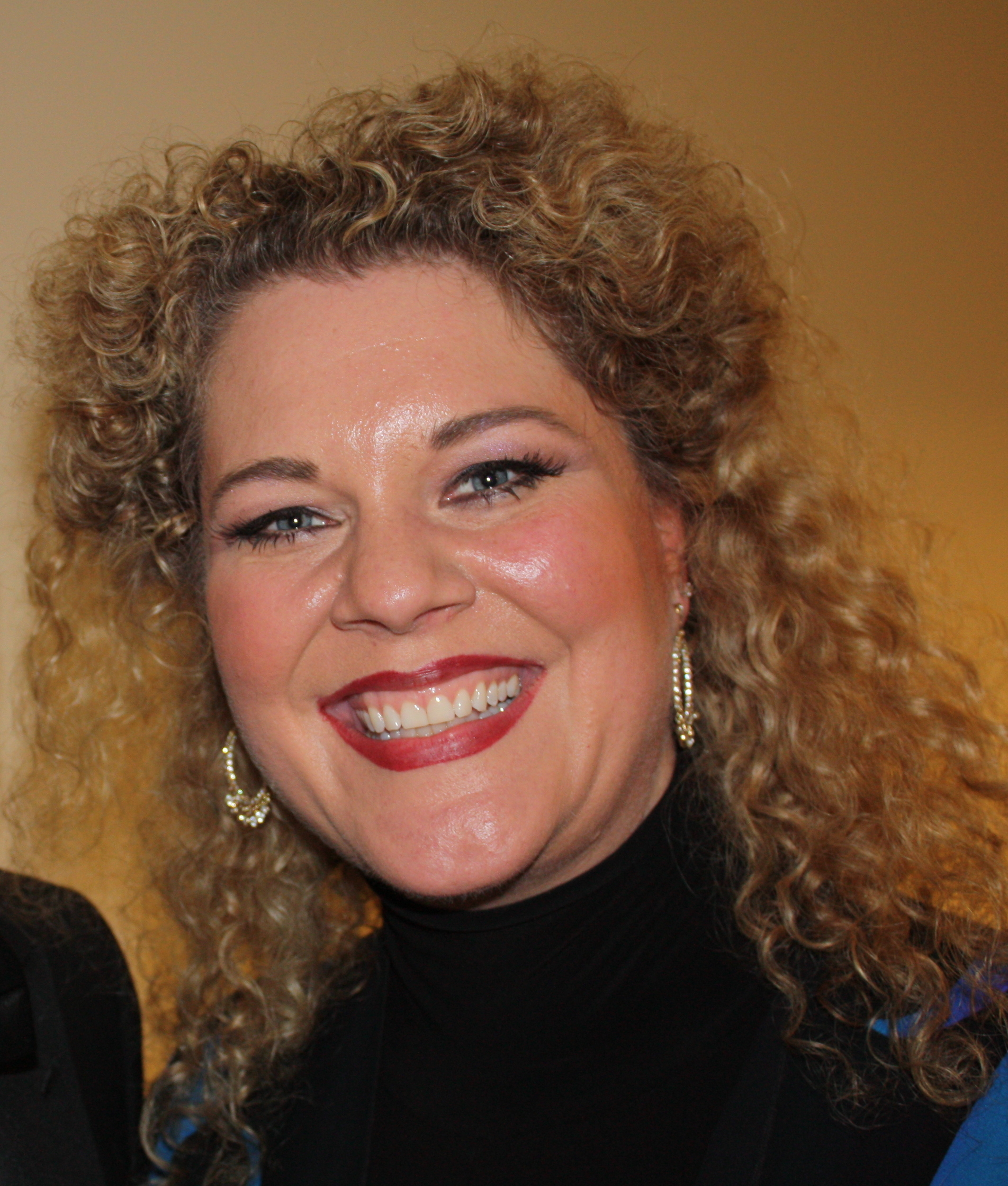
- DeYoung in 2010
- Born: Michelle DeYoung; October 24, 1968 (age 57); Grand Rapids, Michigan, United States
- Occupation: Opera singer (mezzo soprano)
- Years active: 1992–present

Michelle DeYoung (born 1968 in Grand Rapids, Michigan, United States) is an American classical vocalist who has an active international career performing in operas and concerts.

== Early life and education ==
While born in Michigan, DeYoung was raised in Colorado and California, the daughter of a minister. DeYoung is a graduate of the Metropolitan Opera's Lindemann Young Artists Development Program. She won the Metropolitan Opera National Council Auditions in 1992 and has been a regular performer at the Met ever since. In 1995, she was the recipient of the Marian Anderson Award. In 2009, she completed her Bachelor's Degree (that she had to put on hold after going to The Met's Young Artist Program) in Music from California State University, Northridge. Prior to graduation, Michelle sang in the adult choir every Sunday at Our Lady of Lourdes in Northridge, CA, under the direction of Sterling Branton. In May 2010, the University honored her with a Doctorate in Fine Arts for her contributions to the music industry. Past recipients include Michael Eisner and Carol Vaness.

== Career ==
Early in her career, DeYoung sang with Glimmerglass Opera and the Wolf Trap Opera, two companies devoted to fostering the careers and talents of young opera singers. The mezzo-soprano has since performed in leading roles on the stages of many of the world's best opera houses and opera festivals, including the Metropolitan Opera-New York City, the Bayreuth Festival, the Berlin State Opera, the Lyric Opera of Chicago, the Houston Grand Opera, the New National Theatre Tokyo, the Opéra National de Paris, the Salzburg Festival, the Seattle Opera, and the Théâtre du Châtelet. She has enjoyed particular success in portraying Wagnerian roles like Fricka, Sieglinde and Waltraute in The Ring Cycle, Brangäne in Tristan und Isolde, Kundry in Parsifal, and Venus in Tannhäuser. Some of her other stage roles include Gertrude in Hamlet, Jocaste in Oedipus Rex, Judith in Bluebeard's Castle, Marguerite in La Damnation de Faust, and the title role in The Rape of Lucretia. Outside the Wagner roles she has become the premiere Judith in Bluebeard's Castle. She has performed this role with conductor James Levine at Tanglewood, and conductor/composer Pierre Boulez at the Barbican in London, and also with The Cleveland Orchestra. She also performed the role in Salzburg. The role of Judith is one of the most taxing for a mezzo as it goes all the way up to a high C. Michelle DeYoung's range as a singer is three octaves. She also portrayed the role of the Shaman in the world premiere of Tan Dun's The First Emperor at the Metropolitan Opera on December 21, 2006. Ms. DeYoung is also a favorite singer for newer composers like John Adams and Elliot Carter, having premiered several pieces.

In 2008, DeYoung made her debut at La Scala as Brangäne, a performance which was recorded live for release on DVD. She also sang the role of Didon in the 2-time Grammy Award winning recording of Hector Berlioz's Les Troyens under the baton of Sir Colin Davis in 2001. She also recorded a solo album, Songs, which was released on the EMI label in 1999. Her discography also includes a number of works from the concert repertoire, including Gustav Mahler's Symphony No. 3 with the Cincinnati Symphony Orchestra, Mahler's Kindertotenlieder and Mahler's Symphony No. 3 with the San Francisco Symphony, Leonard Bernstein's first two symphonies with Leonard Slatkin and the BBC Orchestra, and the Grammy Award winning recording of John Corigliano's Symphony Number 1 with Slatkin and the National Symphony Orchestra among others. The 2003 Mahler Symphony No. 3 recording with Michael Tilson Thomas and the San Francisco Symphony won DeYoung her third Grammy Award in the Best Classical Album Award.

== Conducting projects ==
In addition to her singing career, she made her debut as a conductor with the Boulder Symphony at the Boulder Theater in Colorado on May 15, 2021. After that experience she created Ensemble Charité, a not-for-profit organization with both charitable and musical ambitions, in which she sings and conducts. The first concert took place on March 23, 2022, and the second one took on September 20, both in Broomfield, Colorado

== Selected recordings ==
- Berlioz, Les Troyens, Ben Heppner, Peter Mattei, Tigran Martirossian, Stephen Milling, Kenneth Tarver, Toby Spence, Isabelle Cals, Petra Lang, Michelle DeYoung, Sara Mingardo, London Symphony Orchestra, London Symphony chorus, conducted by Colin Davis (Recorded live at the Barbican Hall, December). 4 CD: LSO Live, Cat: LSO0010 (2000)
