= 10th Annual Grammy Awards =

1968 US music awards ceremony

- Date: February 29, 1968
- Location: Chicago, Los Angeles, Nashville and New York
- Hosted by: Stan Freberg

Television/radio coverage
- Network: ABC

The 10th Annual Grammy Awards were held on February 29, 1968, at Chicago, Los Angeles, Nashville and New York. They recognized accomplishments of musicians for the year 1967.

== Performers ==
- Glen Campbell, Bobbie Gentry, Chet Atkins, and Jack Jones - Song of the Year medley
- Lou Rawls - Dead End Street
- Ravi Shankar & Yehudi Menuhin - Filmed appearance from a United Nations human rights benefit concert

== Presenters ==
- Tommy Smothers - Introduced Glen Campbell

== Award winners ==
Record of the Year

- "Up, Up and Away" — The 5th Dimension
  - Johnny Rivers & Marc Gordon, producers
- “Somethin’ Stupid” — Nancy Sinatra and Frank Sinatra
  - Jimmy Bowen & Lee Hazelwood, producers
- “Ode To Billie Joe” — Bobbie Gentry
  - Kelly Gordon & Bobby Paris, producers
- “My Cup Runneth Over” — Ed Ames
  - Jim Foglesong & Joe Reisman, producers
- “By The Time I Get To Phoenix” — Glen Campbell
  - Al De Lory, producer

Album of the Year

- “Sgt. Pepper's Lonely Hearts Club Band” — The Beatles
  - George Martin, producer
- “Ode To Billie Joe” — Bobbie Gentry
  - Kelly Gordon & Bobby Paris, producers
- “My Cup Runneth Over” — Ed Ames
  - Jim Foglesong, producer
- “It Must Be Him” — Vikki Carr
  - Tommy Oliver & Dave Pell, producers
- Francis Albert Sinatra/Antonio Carlos Jobim — Frank Sinatra & Antonio Carlos Jobim
  - Sonny Burke, producer

Song of the Year

- "Up, Up and Away" — The 5th Dimension
  - Jimmy L. Webb, songwriter
- “Ode To Billie Joe” — Bobbie Gentry
  - Bobbie Gentry, songwriter
- “My Cup Runneth Over” — Ed Ames
  - Tom Jones & Harvey Schmidt, songwriters
- “Gentle On My Mind” — John Hartford
  - John Hartford, songwriter
- “By The Time I Get To Phoenix” — Glen Campbell
  - Jimmy L. Webb, songwriter

Best New Artist

- Bobbie Gentry
- Jefferson Airplane
- Harpers Bizarre
- The 5th Dimension
- Lana Cantrell

=== Children's ===
- Best Recording for Children
  - Boris Karloff for Dr. Seuss: How the Grinch Stole Christmas

=== Classical ===
- Best Classical Performance - Orchestra
  - Igor Stravinsky (conductor) & the Columbia Symphony Orchestra for Stravinsky: Firebird and Petrouchka Suites
- Best Classical Vocal Soloist Performance
  - Francesco Molinari-Pradelli (conductor), Leontyne Price, & the RCA Italiana Opera Orchestra for Prima Donna, Volume 2
- Best Opera Recording
  - Thomas Z. Shepard (producer), Pierre Boulez (conductor), Walter Berry, Ingeborg Lasser, Isabel Strauss, Fritz Uhl & the Paris National Opera Orchestra & Chorus for Berg: Wozzeck
- Best Classical Choral Performance (other than opera)
  - Leonard Bernstein (conductor) & the London Symphony Orchestra & Choir for Mahler: Symphony No. 8 in E Flat Major (Symphony of a Thousand)
  - Eugene Ormandy (conductor), Robert Page (choir director), the Temple University Choir & the Philadelphia Orchestra for Orff: Catulli Carmina
- Best Classical Performance - Instrumental Soloist or Soloists (with or without orchestra)
  - Vladimir Horowitz for Horowitz in Concert (Haydn, Schumann, Scriabin, Debussy, Mozart, Chopin)
- Best Chamber Music Performance
  - Ravi Shankar & Yehudi Menuhin for West Meets East
- Album of the Year, Classical
  - John McClure (producer), Leonard Bernstein (conductor), various artists & the London Symphony Orchestra for Mahler: Symphony No. 8 (Symphony of a Thousand)
  - Thomas Z. Shepard (producer), Pierre Boulez (conductor), Walter Berry, Ingeborg Lasser, Isabel Strauss, Fritz Uhl, Choeur Nationale de Paris & the Orchestra of Paris National Opera for Berg: Wozzeck

=== Comedy ===
- Best Comedy Performance
  - Bill Cosby for Revenge

=== Composing and arranging ===
- Best Instrumental Theme
  - Lalo Schifrin (composer) for "Mission: Impossible"
- Best Original Score Written for a Motion Picture or a Television Show
  - Lalo Schifrin (composer) for Mission: Impossible
- Best Instrumental Arrangement
  - Burt Bacharach (arranger) for Alfie
- Best Instrumental Arrangement Accompanying Vocalist(s)/Best Background Arrangement
  - Jimmie Haskell (arranger) for "Ode to Billie Joe" performed by Bobbie Gentry

=== Country ===
- Best Country & Western Solo Vocal Performance, Female
  - Tammy Wynette for "I Don't Wanna Play House"
- Best Country & Western Solo Vocal Performance, Male
  - Glen Campbell for "Gentle on My Mind"
- Best Country & Western Performance Duet, Trio or Group (Vocal or Instrumental)
  - Johnny Cash & June Carter for "Jackson"
- Best Country & Western Recording
  - Al De Lory (producer) & Glen Campbell for "Gentle on My Mind"
- Best Country & Western Song
  - John Hartford (songwriter) for "Gentle on My Mind" performed by Glen Campbell

=== Folk ===
- Best Folk Performance
  - John Hartford for Gentle On My Mind

=== Gospel ===
- Best Gospel Performance
  - Porter Wagoner & The Blackwood Brothers for More Grand Old Gospel album
- Best Sacred Performance
  - Elvis Presley for "How Great Thou Art" from the album How Great Thou Art

=== Jazz ===
- Best Instrumental Jazz Performance, Small Group or Soloist With Small Group
  - Cannonball Adderley for Mercy, Mercy, Mercy performed by the Cannonball Adderley Quintet
- Best Instrumental Jazz Performance, Large Group or Soloist with Large Group
  - Duke Ellington for "Far East Suite"

=== Musical show ===
- Best Score From an Original Cast Show Album
  - Fred Ebb, John Kander (composers), Goddard Lieberson (producer) & the original cast (Joel Grey, Jill Haworth, Lotte Lenya, Jack Gilford & Bert Convy) for Cabaret

=== Packaging and notes ===
- Best Album Cover, Graphic Arts
  - Jann Haworth & Peter Blake (art directors) for Sgt. Pepper's Lonely Hearts Club Band performed by The Beatles
- Best Album Cover, Photography
  - Robert Cato & John Berg (art directors) & Roland Scherman (photographer) for Bob Dylan's Greatest Hits performed by Bob Dylan
- Best Album Notes
  - John D. Loudermilk (notes writer) for Suburban Attitudes in Country Verse performed by John D. Loudermilk

=== Pop ===
- Best Vocal Performance, Female
  - Bobbie Gentry for "Ode to Billie Joe"
- Best Vocal Performance, Male
  - Glen Campbell for "By the Time I Get to Phoenix"
- Best Performance by a Vocal Group
  - The 5th Dimension for "Up, Up and Away"
- Best Performance by a Chorus
  - Johnny Mann for "Up, Up and Away" performed by the Johnny Mann Singers
- Best Instrumental Performance
  - Chet Atkins for Chet Atkins Picks the Best
- Best Contemporary Female Solo Vocal Performance
  - Bobbie Gentry for "Ode to Billie Joe"
- Best Contemporary Male Solo Vocal Performance
  - Glen Campbell for "By the Time I Get to Phoenix"
- Best Contemporary Group Performance (Vocal or Instrumental)
  - The 5th Dimension for "Up, Up and Away"
- Best Contemporary Single
  - Johnny Rivers & Marc Gordon (producers) & The 5th Dimension for "Up, Up and Away"
- Best Contemporary Album
  - George Martin (producer) & The Beatles for Sgt. Pepper's Lonely Hearts Club Band

=== Production and engineering ===
- Best Engineered Recording - Non-Classical
  - Geoff E. Emerick (engineer) for Sgt. Pepper's Lonely Hearts Club Band performed by The Beatles
- Best Engineered Recording, Classical
  - Edward T. Graham (engineer) & the Philadelphia Brass Ensemble for The Glorious Sound of Brass

=== R&B ===
- Best R&B Solo Vocal Performance, Female
  - Aretha Franklin for "Respect"
- Best R&B Solo Vocal Performance, Male
  - Lou Rawls for "Dead End Street"
- Best Rhythm & Blues Group Performance, Vocal or Instrumental
  - Sam & Dave for "Soul Man"
- Best Rhythm & Blues Recording
  - Aretha Franklin for "Respect"

=== Spoken ===
- Best Spoken Word, Documentary or Drama Recording
  - Everett M. Dirksen for Gallant Men
