= Maurice Bouchor =

French poet

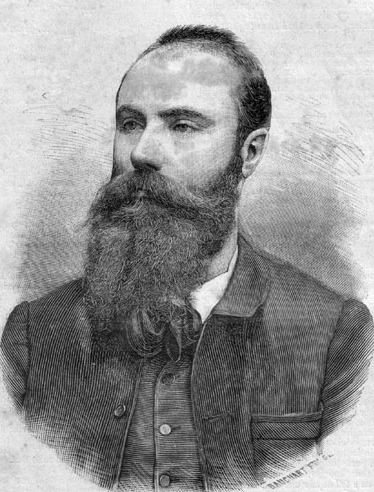
Maurice Bouchor

Maurice Bouchor (18 November 1855 – 18 January 1929) was a French poet.

He was born in Paris. He published in succession Chansons joyeuses (1874), Poèmes de l'amour et de la mer (1875), Le Faust moderne (1878) in prose and verse, and Les Contes parisiens (1880) in verse. His Aurore (1883) showed a tendency to religious mysticism, which reached its fullest expression in Les Symboles (1888; new series, 1895), the most interesting of his works. He contributed to the satirical weekly Le Courrier français.

Bouchor (whose brother, Joseph-Félix Bouchor, b. 1853, became well known as an artist) was a sculptor as well as a poet, and he designed and worked the figures used in his charming pieces as marionettes, the words being recited or chanted by himself or his friends behind the scenes. These miniature dramas on religious subjects, Tobie (1889), Noel (1890) and Sainte Cécile (1892), were produced in Paris at the Théâtre des Marionnettes. A one-act verse drama by Bouchor, Conte de Noël, was played at the Théâtre Français in 1895, but Dieu le veut (1888) was not produced. In conjunction with the musician Julien Tiersot (b. 1857), he made efforts for the preservation of the French folk songs, and published Chants populaires pour les écoles (1897).
