= Cabaret (original Broadway cast recording) =

Cast recording by various artists
- Released: 1966
- Genre: Show tunes
- Label: Columbia Masterworks

Cabaret is an album containing a recording of the 1966 Broadway musical Cabaret made by its original cast. The album was released by Columbia Masterworks on November 28, 1966.

== Critical reception ==
Professional ratings
Review scores
Source	Rating
Billboard	(positive)
AllMusic	5/5 stars

Billboard picked the album for its "Spotlight" section. The magazine's reviewer noted that Columbia Records captured "the full carousing flavor of the Broadway hit" and conluded: "Due to become a big hit."

In her retrospective review for AllMusic, Marjorie Ellen Ruhlmann rated the album 5 stars out of five.

== Chart performance ==
The album reached number 37 on the Billboard's Top LPs chart.

== Track listing ==
LP – Columbia Masterworks KOL 6640 (mono), KOS 3040 (stereo)

All lyrics are written by Fred Ebb; all music is composed by John Kander.

Side 1
No.	Title	Artist(s)	Length
1.	"Willkommen"	Joel Grey, company
2.	"So What?"	Lotte Lenya
3.	"Don't Tell Mama"	Jill Haworth, Joel Grey, girls
4.	"Telephone Song"	Bert Convy, company
5.	"Perfectly Marvelous"	Bert Convy, Jill Haworth
6.	"Two Ladies"	Joel Grey, Rita O'Connor, Mary Ehara
7.	"It Couldn't Please Me More"	Lotte Lenya, Jack Gilford
8.	"Tomorrow Belongs to Me"	Robert Sharpe, Joel Grey, waiters

Side 2
No.	Title	Artist(s)	Length
1.	"Entr'acte"	Kit Kat Band
2.	"Why Should I Wake Up?"	Bert Convy
3.	"The Money Song"	Joel Grey, cabaret girls
4.	"Married"	Lotte Lenya, Jack Gilford
5.	"Meeskite"	Jack Gilford
6.	"If You Could See Her" ("The Gorilla Song")	Joel Grey
7.	"What Would You Do"	Lotte Lenya
8.	"Cabaret"	Jill Haworth
9.	"Finale"	Company

== Charts ==
Chart (1967)	Peak position
US Billboard Top LPs	37

== Awards ==
Year	Award type	Categories	Results	Ref.
1968	Grammy Awards	Best Score from an Original Cast Show Album	Won	
