= Julien Tiersot =

French musicologist, composer and pioneer in ethnomusicology

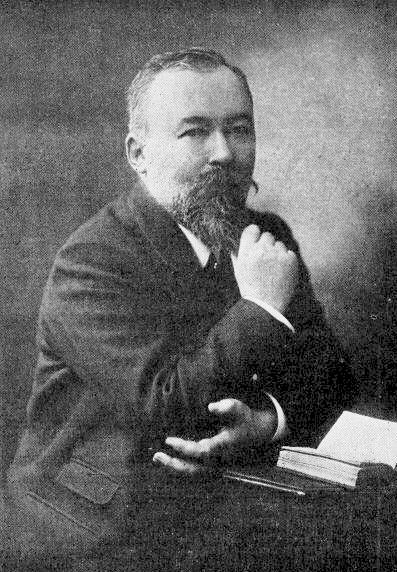
Julien Tiersot

Julien Tiersot (5 July 1857 in Bourg-en-Bresse (Rhône-Alpes) – 10 August 1936 in Paris), was a French musicologist, composer and a pioneer in ethnomusicology.

== Biography ==
Tiersot was first keenly interested in popular French music, on which he published in 1889 his Histoire de la chanson populaire en France, "History of the Popular Song in France." He attempted to trace the history of the genre, linking it to the educated, classical foundations, an approach which was greeted dimly by his contemporaries.

The same year, during the 1889 Paris Exposition, he discovered the Javanese gamelan through the dances he observed, and shortly thereafter published Promenades musicales à l'exposition, Les danses javanaises (Musical tours at the Exhibition: The Javanese Danses). He thus became aware of the value of non-European music and musicians, which were also, as he expressed it, "manifestations of human nature." He discovered that these traditions could also extend to "classical" genres, just as developed as that in the West, and distinguished from a popular musical tradition. He thus grew interested in the music of Japan, China, Java, India, Central Asia, the Arab region, and Armenia as well as Amerindian and African-American musical culture. As such, he was an early pioneer of what would later become ethnomusicology, and which he termed "Musical Ethnography" in his notes of 1905–1910.

His research gave rise to a number of controversies, since his findings often contradicted inherited notions about ethnographic hierarchies. "Does not the music of people separated by space, have the same value as that of people separated by time?" he asked in the preface to his 1905 (repr. 1910) work Notes d'ethnographie musicale (Notes concerning musical ethnography). His works extended beyond a musical aesthetic framework to include sociological considerations.

From 1895 to 1900, he collected roughly 450 popular songs from the French Alps, as well as regional variations, eventually amassing more than 1,200 scores. The resulting publication, Chansons populaires recueillies dans les Alpes françaises appeared in 1903, which included 227 of these melodies.

His curiosity and activities extended to many different classical composers, such as Couperin, Bach, Berlioz and Smetana.

Tiersot sang the tenor part in the premiere of Chabrier's Duo de l'ouvreuse de l'Opéra-Comique et de l'employé du Bon Marché in April 1888.

In 1917, Arthur Honegger wrote the Chant de Nigamon, a symphonic poem based on three Iroquois themes that he found in the Notes concerning Musical Ethnography of Julien Tiersot.

Julien Tiersot has been president of the French association of musicologists Société française de musicologie (1920-1923) and again 1927.

== Selected publications ==
- Histoire de la chanson populaire en France, 1889
- Promenades musicales à l'exposition, Les danses javanaises, 1889
- Chants populaires pour les écoles, poèmes de Maurice Bouchor, 1897
- Chansons populaires recueillies dans les Alpes françaises, 1903 Texte en ligne
- Hector Berlioz et la société de son temps, 1904
- Notes d'ethnographie musicale, 1905–1910
- La Musique dans la comédie de Molière, 1921
- Les Couperin, 1926
- Smetana, 1926
- Musique aux temps romantiques, 1930
- La Chanson populaire et les écrivains romantiques, 1934
- J. S. Bach, 1934
- Lettres françaises de Richard Wagner, 1935
- Mélodies populaires des Provinces de France ( without date )

== See also ==
- Ethnomusicology
