= Folk Den =

American folk music website

- Folk Den logo
- Website type: ibiblio digital library and archive
- Available in: English
- Owner: Roger McGuinn
- Creator: Roger McGuinn
- Website: www.ibiblio.org/jimmy/folkden-wp/
- Commercial: no
- Registration: none
- Launched: 1995; 31 years ago
- Current status: Online
- Content license: Folk Den Songs licensed CC-BY-NC-ND 3.0 US

Folk Den is a folk music website founded in 1995 by Roger McGuinn, former front man of The Byrds. Hosted at the University of North Carolina at Chapel Hill's ibiblio, the site is intended to preserve and promote folk music and offers a new folk song on a monthly basis. Each posting provides an MP3 of a traditional folk song along with a descriptive paragraph, lyrics, guitar chords and related images. The site has received positive reviews from The New York Times, the Discovery Channel, and CNET.

== CD releases ==
A selection of songs from Folk Den, with guest vocalists, was released on CD as Treasures from the Folk Den, which was nominated for a Grammy Award in 2002 for Best Traditional Folk Album. In November 2005, McGuinn released a four-CD box set containing one hundred of his favorite songs from the Folk Den.
