= Duo de l'ouvreuse de l'Opéra-Comique et de l'employé du Bon Marché =

Comic vocal work by Emmanuel Chabrier

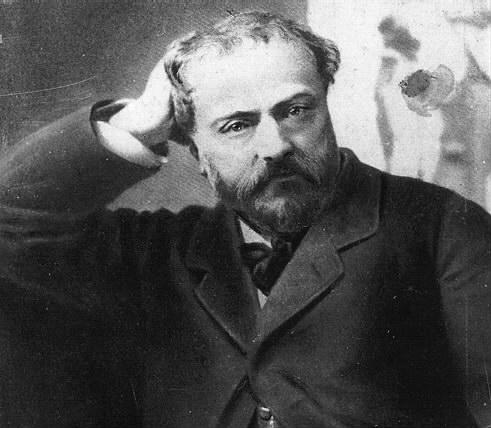
Emmanuel Chabrier in 1882

The Duo de l’ouvreuse de l’Opéra Comique et l’employé du Bon Marché (Duet of the usherette from the Opéra-Comique and the employee of the Bon-Marché department store) is a comic vocal work by Emmanuel Chabrier for soprano and tenor, with piano accompaniment. The lyrics are by Paul Fuchs and Henry Lyon.

== History ==
The work was written in March 1888 for a revue entitled Cent moins un staged at the house of the singer and patroness Madame Henriette Fuchs and was first performed at Fuch's house by Elisabeth Fuchs (her daughter) and Julien Tiersot (a music critic) in April 1888. The revue also had contributions from Jules Massenet, Léo Delibes, Ernest Guiraud, Victorin de Joncières, Théodore Dubois, Vincent d'Indy, Charles Lenepveu, André Messager, Gabriel Pierné and Paul Vidal.

The piece was first published in Le Figaro musical in April 1893, along with the Couplets du capitaine des pompiers (in honour of Colonel Constant, the head of the fire brigade the night of the fire at the Opéra-Comique on 25 May 1887) by André Wormser.

The music is in two verses in a buffo style, with yodeling in the refrain. Chabrier gives indications such as "with a doleful and moronic air", "very stupid" and "dreamily". The usherette, financially secure thanks to government compensation to victims of the fire at the Salle Favart, is able to marry the shop assistant who sings praises to Aristide Boucicaut, founder of the Parisian department store, for his pension, while the usherette lauds Léon Carvalho, director of the Opéra Comique from 1876 to 1887 and 1891–97.

Chabrier wrote to Mme Fuchs on 31 May 1888 to ask her to lend the manuscript to his publishers, Enoch Freress et Costallat, so that they could make a copy of the score.
