= Helmut Burk =

German recording engineer

Helmut Burk is a Grammy Award-winning classical recording engineer and producer. He has worked extensively for the German classical record label, Deutsche Grammophon, and has recorded artists such as Krystian Zimerman, Yuja Wang, Herbert von Karajan, Yundi Li, Maria João Pires, Gidon Kremer, Pierre Boulez, Leonard Bernstein, Claudio Arrau, and numerous others.
