= Isabel Strauss =

German soprano (1928–1973)

Background information
- Born: 1928
- Died: 5 December 1973 (aged 44–45)
- Genre: opera
- Instrument: soprano voice

Isabel Strauss [Strauß] (1928–1973) was a German operatic soprano. She appeared in Munich, Bern, Amsterdam, and Brussels, as well as singing Gutrune in Wieland Wagner's 1963 production of Götterdämmerung, in Cologne. Also in 1963, she portrayed Marta in a film of Tiefland.

In 1964, Strauss was seen on French television in a Concert Version of excerpts from Parsifal (as Kundry), with Wolfgang Windgassen, conducted by Georges Sébastian. The following year, she was seen over the same network in excerpts from Lohengrin (as Ortrud), with Windgassen and Elisabeth Grümmer.

In 1968, a recording of Wozzeck in which she sang received the Grammy Award for Best Opera Recording. Following a 1973 performance of Götterdämmerung, she was a victim of a double suicide, with the conductor Fritz Janota, in a forest near Bern.

== Discography ==
- d'Albert: Tiefland (Schock; Zanotelli, 1963) Eurodisc
- Berg: Wozzeck (Berry; Boulez, 1966) Sony
