= Toby Spence =

British tenor (born 1969)

Toby Spence (born 22 May 1969, Hertford) is a British tenor active internationally on the concert platform, in the opera house and in recordings across a wide range of classical music.

== Early life and studies ==
Spence was born into a musical family that had once owned the London piano manufacturer Squire Pianos. His father was a doctor, and his mother a pianist who worked as an archivist at the Royal College of Music. She had also been personal assistant to Walter Legge and Yehudi Menuhin, and artists and musicians were regular lunch guests at the family home. He was educated at Uppingham School and gained an honours degree in music at New College, Oxford, where he was a choral scholar and his teachers included Edward Higginbottom. He continued his vocal studies at the Guildhall School of Music and Drama, where he studied with David Pollard with whom he has continued vocal studies. While still a student at Guildhall Spence appeared as Normanno in the Dorset Opera Lucia di Lammermoor in Sherborne in 1993.

== Career ==
Spence's professional debut was in 1995 as Idamante in Welsh National Opera's production of Idomeneo, conducted by Sir Charles Mackerras; he repeated the role later the same year in Munich after only one day of rehearsal. Other early engagements included La Calisto with René Jacobs in Brussels, Mitridate in Mitridate Rè di Ponto under Roger Norrington at the Mozart week in Salzburg, and subsequently at the Salzburg Summer Festival, Almaviva in Rossini's The Barber of Seville at the English National Opera, and David in Die Meistersinger under Antonio Pappano at La Monnaie in Brussels. At the same time he was performing on the concert platform in repertoire ranging from Beethoven's Missa Solemnis to Saint François d'Assise by Messiaen.

Toby Spence has on-going connections with English National Opera (ENO), and is a strong believer of the policy of singing in English. He appeared in successive seasons at the Opéra National de Paris and also at the Bavarian State Opera (Bayerische Staatsoper). He was the first Ferdinand in Thomas Adès' opera The Tempest at Covent Garden, and reprised the role in the work's American premiere production at Santa Fe Opera. He has since performed the role of Antonio in the same opera. Following The Tempest he has been invited back regularly to Covent Garden in operas by Rossini, Janáček and Wagner.

He made his Proms debut in 1997, in a performance of the Schubert Mass No. 5 in A flat, following this with Nielsen's Springtime on Funen in 1999, the Bach St John Passion and Parsifal in 2000, Handel's Acis and Galatea in 2001, Les Troyens à Carthage in 2003, Les noces in 2004, the Missa solemnis in 2005, Delius A Song of the High Hills in 2009, Beethoven's Choral Symphony in 2011, Ivor Novello songs and the Berlioz Requiem in 2012, Britten War Requiem in 2014, and Elgar The Dream of Gerontius in 2015.

During 2005 and 2006 his stage roles ranged from Tamino in The Magic Flute at the Teatro Real in Madrid and at ENO, to the Madwoman in Britten's Curlew River at the Edinburgh Festival, Count Almaviva in Rossini's Il barbiere di Siviglia at Covent Garden and Tom Rakewell in Stravinsky's The Rake's Progress. The latter role was one Spence was keen to play from the start of his career, and he has sung it in several productions around the world.

Although he sang in some recitals at the beginning of his professional career, he was dissatisfied with the result and set song to one side for several years. When he resumed recitals his repertoire included Poulenc, Brahms and Britten, as well as the original version of Les nuits d'été with piano.

He made his debut as Aschenbach in Britten's Death in Venice in 2021 (filmed) for the Opéra national du Rhin in Strasbourg, described by one critic as "...powerfully voiced Aschenbach... disintegrate impressively, each utterance of "I, Aschenbach" refrain increasingly more wretched." He sang Vere in the first production of Billy Budd at the Teatro Colón Buenos Aires in July 2025 - "a portrayal of conviction and nuance", having previously sung the role at ENO, Teatro Real Madrid, Rome Opera and the Royal Opera London.

== Recordings ==
Toby Spence has participated in many varied recordings, including songs by Liza Lehmann, Robert Schumann and Arthur Bliss, the Duo de l'ouvreuse de l'Opéra-Comique et de l'employé du Bon Marché by Chabrier, and in Volumes 32 & 35 of the Hyperion Schubert edition.

Other recordings included Parry's Job and Judith, Haydn's The Creation, Paroles tissées by Lutosławski, Offenbach's Vert-Vert, Berlioz's Grande Messe des Morts, Op. 5 and Les Troyens,Handel's La Resurrezione, HWV47, Finzi's Dies natalis, Op. 8, La Rondine, Ferrando in Così fan tutte, Britten's Serenade for Tenor, Horn and Strings, Op. 31, Bantock's Omar Khayyám, Jack in The Midsummer Marriage, the title role in Sullivan's Ivanhoe and Philip, Lord of Mirlemont in Sullivan's The Beauty Stone.

== Personal life ==
In an interview for the Paris Opera in 2008, Spence named Arsène Wenger as his non-musical hero. A man of keen and wide interests, he regularly visits galleries and is a keen concert and cinema goer. He enjoys travelling and in 2003 spent four weeks backpacking around Iran, visiting several cities. His marriage ended in divorce in 2001. In December 2011, he was diagnosed with thyroid cancer, and underwent surgery in February 2012 to remove his glands and lymph nodes. In May 2012, he received the award for Singer of the Year from the Royal Philharmonic Society, and that August sang in public at the Edinburgh Festival for the first time since his operation.

In 2012, Toby and his brother, Magnus Spence, founded a festival of song at Wardsbrook, a farm in East Sussex where Magnus lives with his family. Since its inauguration they have presented recitals by Stéphane Degout, Sarah Connolly, Sir Thomas Allen, Christiane Karg, Felicity Lott, Ian Bostridge and Gyula Orendt. The aim of Wardsbrook is to promote the art of song and raise much needed funds for St Michael's Hospice in St Leonard's, Hastings, which provides palliative care for the community. In the first two years they raised nearly £60,000 for the establishment and running costs of a service that providing home-care for the elderly.
