= Isabelle Cals =

French soprano (born 1993)

- Born: 1993 (age 32–33)
- Education: Opéra de Paris studio
- Occupations: Operatic mezzo-soprano and soprano
- Website: www.isabellecals.com

Isabelle Cals (born 1993) is a French operatic soprano and mezzo-soprano who made an international career in opera and concert. Her roles include Bizet's Carmen and Wagner's Kundry.

== Life and career ==
Born in south-western France, Cals achieved a master's degree in Chinese, and a degree in international relations. She worked as expert for Asia in a lawyer's office and then for three years for Deloitte. She turned to singing at age 24, first as a mezzo-soprano, studying at the Centre de formation lyrique of the Opéra de Paris. Her roles include the title roles of Debussy's Pelléas et Mélisande and Offenbach's La belle Hélène, and Concepcion in Ravel's L'heure espagnole.

Although in demand as a mezzo-soprano, performing roles such as the title role of Bizet's Carmen, she decided to expand her tessitura into the soprano register, and especially study towards a better technique. Her first role as a soprano was Donna Elvira in Mozart's Don Giovanni in 2006. She performed Wagner's Wesendonck-Lieder with the Landesjugendorchester Berlin, Les nuits d'été and La mort de Cléopâtre by Berlioz, Ravel's Shéhérazade, conducted by François-Xavier Roth. She sang Messiaen’s Harawi at the Festival Messiaen, and Four Last Songs by Richard Strauss at the Festival du Septembre Musical de l'Orne. She sang the part of Marguerite in Honegger's Jeanne d'Arc au bûcher, conducted by Alain Altinoglu, on stage in Montpellier in 2006, and appeared in a half-scenic production of the oratorio with chorus and orchestra of the Accademia Nazionale di Santa Cecilia conducted by Antonio Pappano in 2008. She performed the soprano solo of Beethoven's Ninth Symphony in 2019 at the Opéra de Marseille.

Operatic soprano roles include the title roles of Lully's Armide and Béatrice et Bénédict by Berlioz, Giulietta in Offenbach's Les contes d'Hoffmann, Marguerite in La damnation de Faust, the Foreign Princess in Dvorák's Rusalka, Alice Ford in Verdi's Falstaff, Tatiana in Tchaikovsky's Eugene Onegin, Madame Lidoine in Poulenc's Dialogues des Carmélites, and the Governess in Britten's The Turn of the Screw.

In 2023 she appeared as Kundry in Wagner's Parsifal in the project of the Stadttheater Minden, directed by Eric Vigié, with the Nordwestdeutsche Philharmonie conducted by Frank Beermann, alongside Jussi Myllys in the title role, Tijl Faveyts as Gurnemanz and Roman Trekel as Amfortas. A reviewer noted that she portrayed the different aspects of her character with haunting stage presence and a lyrical-dramatic voice and at times a delicate dark timbre.

=== Personal life ===
Cals is married to the Austrian tenor Nikolai Schukoff. They have a residence in a village in the Lot department in south-western France.

== Recordings ==
Cals recorded music by Hector Berlioz in the complete works with Sir Colin Davis and the London Symphony Orchestra, Ascanio in Benvenuto Cellini and Ascagne in Les Troyens, a 2000 recording that received many awards including Grammy Awards. She recorded the role of Mercedes in Carmen in 2003, with the Orchestre Capitole de Toulouse conducted by Michel Plasson. She appeared as Javotte in a recording of Massenet's Manon with Renée Fleming in the title role, and choir and orchestra of the Opéra National de Paris conducted by Jesús López Cobos.
