= Stephen Milling =

Danish operatic bass

- Born: 1965 (age 60–61); Copenhagen, Denmark
- Education: Royal Danish Academy of Music
- Children: 3
- Awards: Seattle Opera's Artist of the Year Grammy Award for Best Opera Recording Grammy Award for Best Classical Album

Stephen Milling is a Danish operatic bass who has had an active international career since the mid-1990s. Although his repertoire encompasses a wide range, he is particularly known for his roles in the operas of Richard Wagner.

== Career ==
Born 1965 in Copenhagen, Milling studied voice at the Royal Danish Academy of Music and has been a member of the Royal Danish Opera since 1994, serving as a principal bass from 1994–2012. In addition to his operatic performances, he is a concert artist and has performed with well-known conductors throughout Europe.

=== Debuts and early performances ===
- In the 1999-2000 season, Milling made his La Scala debut as Don Fernando in Beethoven's Fidelio under conductor Riccardo Muti.
- Soon afterwards, he made his American debut with the Seattle Opera, singing Fasolt in Das Rheingold and Hunding in Die Walküre in Wagner's Der Ring des Nibelungen.
- He returned to Seattle as Gurnemanz in Parsifal for which he won the opera's Artist of the Year award in 2003.
- In 2004, he made his debut at the Metropolitan Opera in New York in the role of Sparafucile in Rigoletto.
- He made his Royal Opera debut in 2005 as Hunding in Die Walküre
- He also sang the roles of King Marke at the Lyric Opera of Chicago, Sarastro in The Magic Flute at the Royal Opera, London, Gurnemanz and King Marke at the Vienna State Opera, and Rocco at the Liceu.

=== 2009 to present ===
Highlights of Milling's career since 2009 include:

- The Verdi Requiem with Mariss Jansons and the Berlin Philharmonic (2010)
- King Marke in Tristan und Isolde with the Seattle Opera (2010).
- King Philip in Don Carlos at the Vienna State Opera
- Fafner in Siegfried and Narbal in Les Troyens at the Palau de les Arts Reina Sofía in Valencia with Valery Gergiev
- Hermann Landgraf in Tannhäuser and Sarastro in The Magic Flute at the Copenhagen Opera House
- Hagen role debut in Götterdämmerung at the 2015 Bayreuth Festival under Kirill Petrenko
- Gurnemanz in Parsifal at the Staatsoper Stuttgart
- Sarastro in The Magic Flute under the stage direction of Simon McBurney at the Bergen National Opera in Norway (2022) and at the Metropolitan Opera in New York (2023)
- Daland in The Flying Dutchman

== Awards and Recordings ==
Milling received the Gladsaxe (Denmark) Music Prize in 1997. The prize is awarded each year to a young performing musician of "considerable talent."

In December 2000, Milling performed Narbal in Les Troyens by Hector Berlioz with Sir Colin Davis conducting the London Symphony Orchestra. A recording of this performance won Grammy Awards for Best Classical Album and Best Opera Recording in 2002. In April 2002, Milling sang the same role with the Chicago Symphony under Zubin Mehta.

The Seattle Opera awarded Milling its Artist of the Year Award in 2003 for his portrayal of Gurnemanz in Parsifal.

A number of recordings that include Milling are available on CD. In addition, a 2009 production of Der Ring des Nibelungen that was staged in Valencia by the Spanish group La Fura dels Baus under the direction of Zubin Mehta is available on DVD.

== Personal life ==
Milling grew up in the village of Annisse by the lake Arresø in Denmark. Milling is married and has three sons. He has taken his family to Seattle for rehearsals, starting when his youngest was only 13 days old.
