= Ben Heppner =

Canadian opera singer and broadcaster (born 1956)

Thomas Bernard Heppner CC (born January 14, 1956) is a Canadian tenor and broadcaster, now retired from singing, who specialized in opera and other classical works for voice. He was widely regarded as the foremost Wagner tenor of his era.

== Early life and career ==
Heppner, was born in Murrayville, British Columbia, and lived in Dawson Creek, British Columbia. His family were Mennonites.

Following secondary school in Dawson Creek, Heppner pursued further studies at the Canadian Bible College in Regina, Saskatchewan (1973–74). In later years he would sing solo for the Billy Graham Crusades in Toronto and Ottawa.

He pursued musical studies at the University of British Columbia from 1975 to 1979, studying with voice teacher French Tickner. He first attracted national attention when he won the CBC Talent Festival in 1979, singing Mozart's "Il mio tesoro" from Don Giovanni. He later studied opera at University of Toronto.

In 1987, under the tutelage of voice teachers William Neill and Dixie Ross Neill, Heppner made a successful transition to the spinto voice category, specializing in the Germanic repertoire. Heppner won the Metropolitan Opera Auditions in 1988 which launched his career. He also won the Birgit Nilsson Prize in 1988.

== International career ==
He was associated with the Wagnerian repertoire, but he performed a range of operas from the German, French and Italian canons. Heppner performed frequently with opera companies in the United States (including the New York Metropolitan Opera) and Europe, and concert appearances with symphony orchestras. Heppner was widely regarded as the foremost Wagner tenor of his era.

Heppner achieved renown in 1993 with the role of Walther von Stolzing in the recording of Wagner's Die Meistersinger von Nürnberg conducted by Wolfgang Sawallisch with the Bavarian State Orchestra.

In 1994, Heppner performed the role of Florestan in Beethoven's Fidelio with Günther Herbig conducting the Toronto Symphony Orchestra.

Heppner recorded Wagner's Die Meistersinger von Nürnberg in 1995 with Sir Georg Solti and the Chicago Symphony Orchestra. He performed Beethoven's Fidelio at the Salzburg Festival with Solti conducting the Vienna Philharmonic Orchestra in 1996, which would be the conductor's final operatic performance, and recorded the work that same year with Sir Colin Davis conducting the Bavarian Radio Symphony Orchestra.

Heppner has often performed Gustav Mahler's Das Lied von der Erde, including a 1995 performance conducted by Bernard Haitink.

He first performed Tristan in Wagner's Tristan und Isolde with the Seattle Opera in 1998, and in November 1998 with the Berlin Philharmonic conducted by Claudio Abbado. Heppner also performed and recorded Wagner's Götterdämmerung with the Berlin Philharmonic conducted by Sir Simon Rattle. He specialized in operatic roles including the title part in Lohengrin, the title part in Otello, and Berlioz's Aeneas in Les Troyens.

He has appeared in the DVD recordings of the Metropolitan Opera productions of Beethoven's Fidelio, Wagner's Die Meistersinger von Nürnberg, and Wagner's Tristan und Isolde, three of his signature roles.

Heppner performed and recorded two major operas composed by Richard Strauss with Giuseppe Sinopoli conducting the Staatskapelle Dresden, Die Frau ohne Schatten and Ariadne auf Naxos.

Also with Sir Colin Davis, Heppner recorded the role of Aeneas in Berlioz' Les Troyens.

Heppner has recorded on multiple labels, participating in complete operas and solo albums of arias and songs. He was signed to an exclusive contract with Deutsche Grammophon (DG). His first solo recording for DG, made in 2001, was Airs Français accompanied by Myung-whun Chung conducting the London Symphony Orchestra. It won a Juno Award.

== Honours ==
Heppner has received Honorary Doctorates from Queen's University (2006), McMaster Divinity College (2005), York University (2003), Memorial University of Newfoundland (2003), University of Toronto (2002), McGill University (2002), and University of British Columbia (1997).

Heppner was awarded the National Arts Centre Award, a companion award of the Governor General's Performing Arts Awards in 1995. He was made a Member of the Order of Canada in 1999, was promoted to Officer in 2002 and Companion in 2008. He performed at closing ceremonies of two Winter Olympic Games. In Turin in 2006, he sang the Canadian national anthem. Four years later, in Vancouver, he sang the Olympic Hymn. Both times, he mixed English and French. In June 2016, Heppner was made a laureate of the Governor General's Performing Arts Awards, with a Lifetime Achievement Award in Classical Music.

== Retirement ==
Heppner announced his retirement from singing in April 2014. Heppner felt unable to be a "part-time singer", feeling that "No matter how often you sing, if you're going to sing at a good level, a quality level, you've got to keep it up all the time. And I was finding that to be a little bit difficult. So that, plus the fact that I've been experiencing a little bit of unreliability in my voice – and that causes some anxieties – I decided it was time".

Post-retirement, Heppner accepted a brief role in a musical production of Titanic at the Princess of Wales Theatre in Toronto in May 2015.

Heppner became a broadcaster on Canadian radio, hosting Saturday Afternoon at the Opera and Backstage with Ben Heppner on CBC Radio. He retired from broadcasting in September 2021.

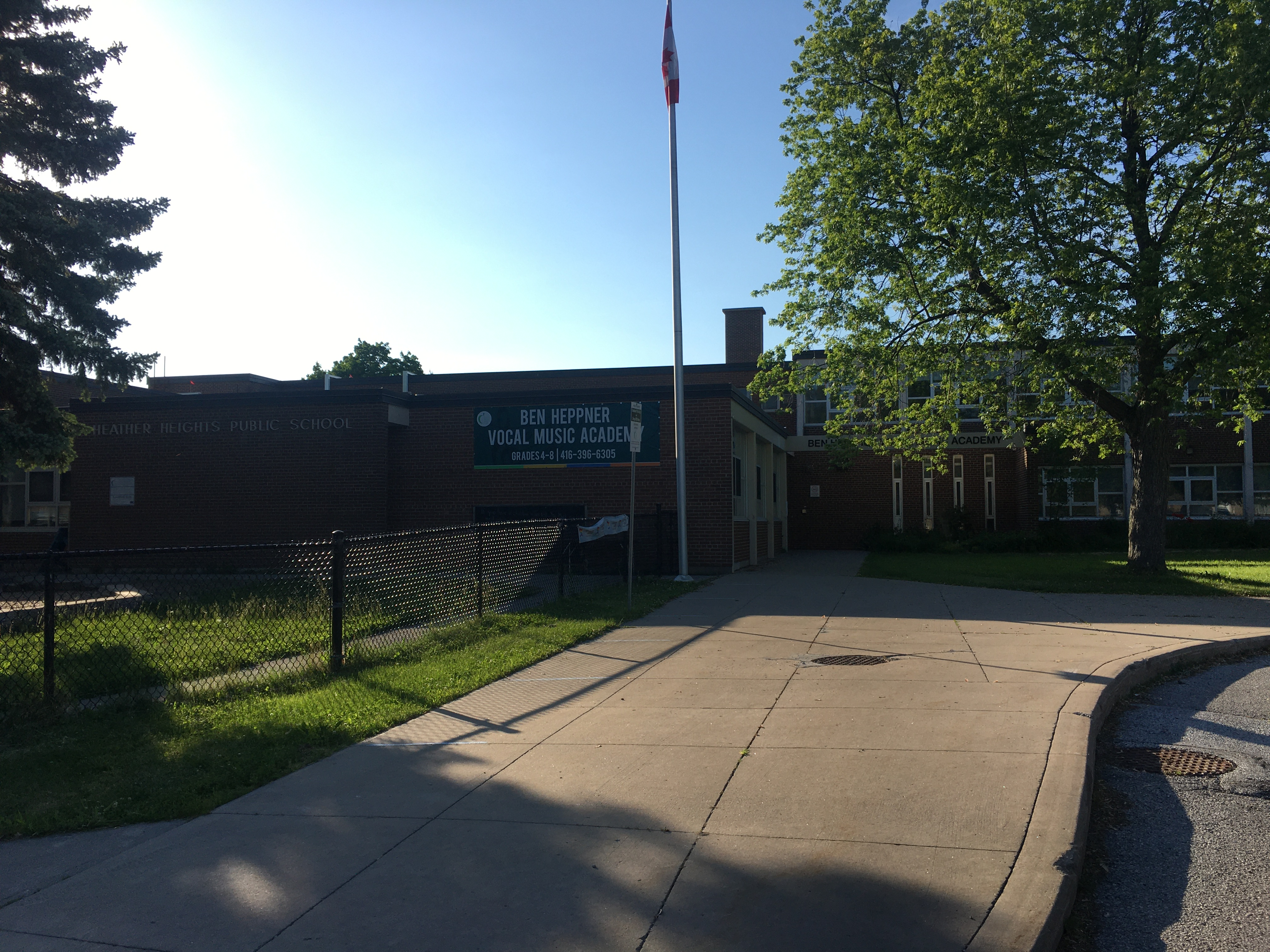
The Ben Heppner Vocal Music Academy at Heather Heights Junior Public School

Heppner plans to continue hosting master classes and coaching singers for roles, and appearing on voice competition juries. The Ben Heppner Vocal Music Academy, a public school in Scarborough, named after Heppner, opened in 2012.

== Discography ==
=== Opera ===
- 1992: Weber: Oberon (Hüon von Bordeaux). Gürzenich Orchestra Cologne, James Conlon. EMI.
- 1993: Puccini: Turandot (Calaf). Münchner Rundfunkorchester, Roberto Abbado. RCA.
- 1994: Wagner: Die Meistersinger von Nürnberg (Walther von Stolzing). Bavarian State Orchestra, Wolfgang Sawallisch. EMI.
- 1995: Massenet: Hérodiade (Jean). Orchestre du Capitole de Toulouse, Michel Plasson. EMI.
- 1995: Wagner: Lohengrin (Lohengrin). Bavarian Radio Symphony Orchestra, Sir Colin Davis. RCA.
- 1996: Beethoven: Fidelio (Florestan). Bavarian Radio Symphony Orchestra, Sir Colin Davis. RCA.
- 1997: Wagner: Die Meistersinger von Nürnberg (Walther von Stolzing). Chicago Symphony Orchestra, Sir Georg Solti. Decca.
- 1997: Wagner: The Flying Dutchman (Erik). Metropolitan Opera Orchestra, James Levine. Sony.
- 1997: Strauss: Die Frau ohne Schatten (the Emperor). Staatskapelle Dresden, Giuseppe Sinopoli. Teldec.
- 1998: Wagner Lohengrin (Lohengrin) Metropolitan Opera Orchestra, James Levine
- 1998: Dvořák: Rusalka (Prince). Czech Philharmonic, Sir Charles Mackerras. Decca.
- 2001: Berlioz: Les Troyens (Énée). London Symphony Orchestra, Sir Colin Davis. LSO Live.
- 2001: Strauss: Ariadne auf Naxos (Tenor/Bacchus). Staatskapelle Dresden, Giuseppe Sinopoli. Deutsche Grammophon.

=== Recital ===
- 1995: Ben Heppner Sings Richard Strauss. Toronto Symphony Orchestra, Andrew Davis (conductor). CBC.
- 1995: Great Tenor Arias. Münchner Rundfunkorchester, Roberto Abbado. RCA.
- 1998: German Romantic Opera. North German Radio Symphony Orchestra, Donald Runnicles. RCA.
- 1998: Dedication. Craig Rutenberg. RCA.
- 1999: My Secret Heart. London Philharmonic Orchestra, Jonathan Tunick. RCA.
- 2001: Airs Français. London Symphony Orchestra, Myung-Whun Chung. Deutsche Grammophon
- 2003: Ideale: Songs of Paolo Tosti. Members of the London Symphony Orchestra. Deutsche Grammophon.
- 2006: Heppner/Wagner: Excerpts from The Ring of the Nibelung. Staatskapelle Dresden, Peter Schneider. Deutsche Grammophon.

=== Others ===
- 1984: Bach: Wachet auf, ruft uns die Stimme, BWV 140. CBC Vancouver Orchestra, Wayne Riddell. CBC.
- 1994: Mahler: Das Lied von der Erde. Cologne Radio Symphony Orchestra, Gary Bertini. EMI
- 1995: Various: Along the Road to Bethlehem. Members of the Toronto Symphony Orchestra, Jean Ashworth Bartle.
- 1996: Beethoven: Symphony No. 9. Berlin Philharmonic, Claudio Abbado. Sony.
- 1997: Mahler: Symphony No. 8. Bavarian Radio Symphony Orchestra, Sir Colin Davis. RCA.
- 2000: Mahler: Das Lied von der Erde. Bavarian Radio Symphony Orchestra, Lorin Maazel. RCA.
- 2001: Mahler: Symphony No. 8. Royal Concertgebouw Orchestra, Riccardo Chailly. Decca.
- 2001: Somers: Songs from the Heart of Somers. John Hess. Centrediscs.
- 2004: Arnold Schoenberg: Gurre-Lieder. Munich Philharmonic, James Levine. Oehms Classics.
- 2004: Wagner: Siegfried, 3rd act. Munich Philharmonic, James Levine. Oehms Classics.
