= Trin-i-tee 5:7 discography =

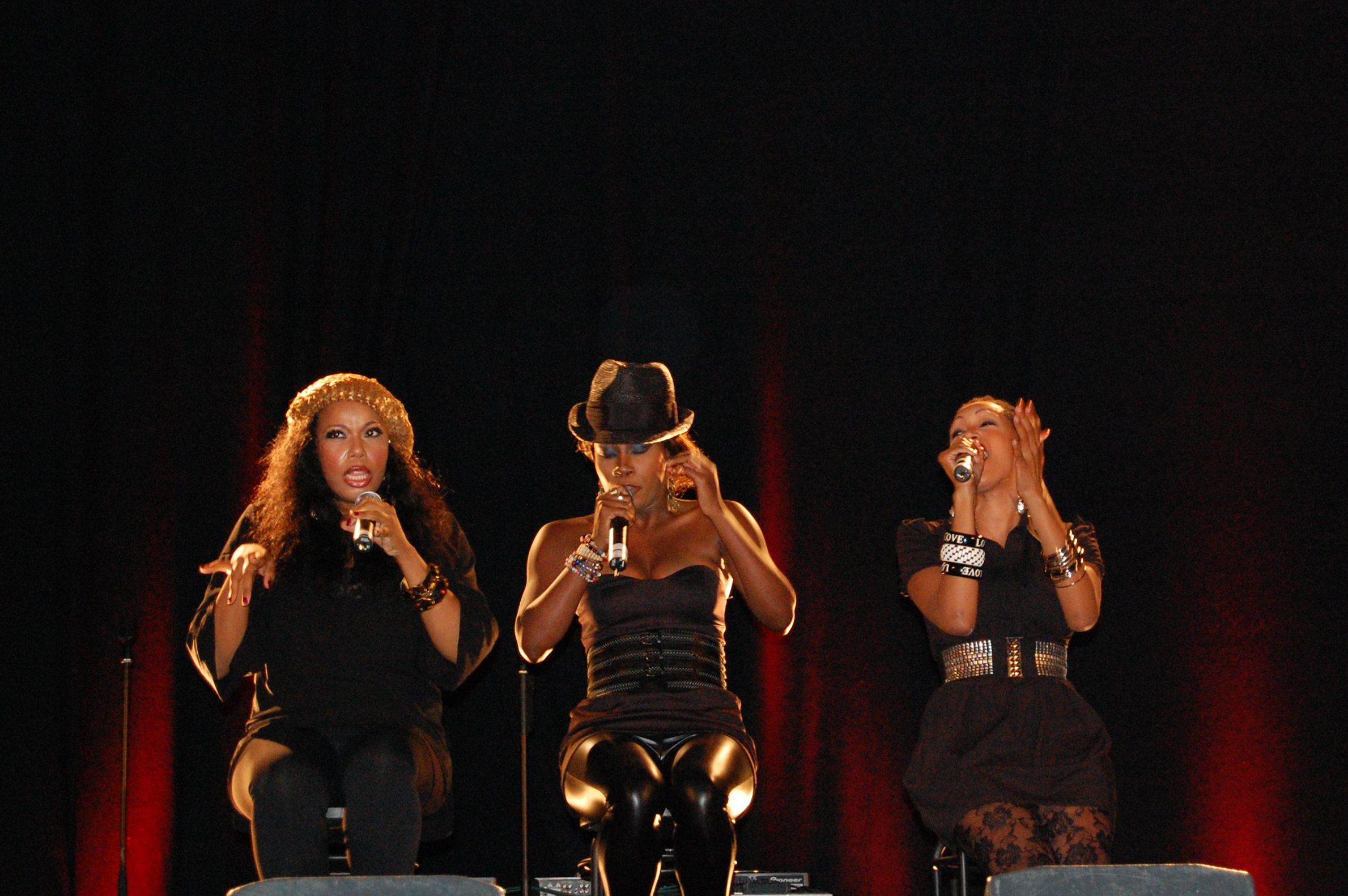
- Anderson, Haynes, Taylor performing in 2009
- Studio albums: 5
- Extended plays: 1
- Compilation albums: 2
- Singles: 15
- Music videos: 11

American gospel girl group Trin-i-tee 5:7 has released five studio albums, two compilation albums, one holiday album, one extended play, and fifteen singles.

Trin-i-tee 5:7 released their self-titled debut album in the United States in July 1998 and it peaked at number 139 on the Billboard 200. It earned a gold certification in the United States by the Recording Industry Association of America (RIAA). The album's lead single, "God's Grace", reached number twenty-three on the Billboard Gospel Airplay. Second album, Spiritual Love, was released in December 1999, and was their breakthrough release debuting at number 1 on the Billboard Top Gospel Albums chart. The second single, "My Body", peaked at number thirty-five on the US Billboard Adult R&B Songs. The album eventually sold over one million copies worldwide.

The group's third album, The Kiss, was released in the summer of 2002 and peaked at number two on Billboard Top Gospel Albums. After a five-year hiatus, the group reunited to record their fourth studio album, T57, released in September 2007. The album reached number two on the Top Gospel Albums. Three singles were released from the album: "Listen", "I Will Lift", and "Get Away". A fifth studio album, Angel & Chanelle, was released in May 2011 following their split. Trin-i-tee 5:7 has sold over 2.5 million records worldwide, and All Music Guide ranks them as one of the most successful contemporary gospel acts of their era.

== Albums ==
=== Studio albums ===
Title	Album details	Peak chart positions					Certifications
Title	Album details	US	US Gospel	US Christian	US R&B	US Indie	Certifications
Trin-i-tee 5:7	Released: July 14, 1998; Label: Gospocentric; Format: CD, cassette, digital download	139	1	2	20	—	RIAA: Gold
Spiritual Love	Released: December 28, 1999; Label: Gospocentric; Format: CD, cassette, digital download	174	1	5	41	—	
The Kiss	Released: August 6, 2002; Label: Gospocentric; Format: CD, digital download	85	2	3	15	—	
T57	Released: September 18, 2007; Label: Spirit Rising; Format: CD, digital download	102	2	5	12	11	
Angel & Chanelle	Released: May 31, 2011; Label: Music World Gospel; Format: CD, digital download	20	1	—	2	5	

=== Christmas album ===
Title	Album details	Peak chart positions		Certifications
Title	Album details	US Gospel	US R&B	Certifications
Love, Peace, Joy at Christmas	Released: October 26, 2009; Label: Music World Gospel; Format: CD, digital download	10	62	

=== Compilation albums ===
Title	Album details	Peak chart positions			Certifications
Title	Album details	US Gospel	US Christian	US R&B	Certifications
Holla: The Best of Trin-i-tee 5:7	Released: June 26, 2007; Label: Gospocentric; Format: CD, digital download	17	45	70	
Trin-i-tee 5:7 Hits	Released: July 23, 2013; Label: Music World Gospel; Format: CD, digital download	26	—	—	
Story of My Life	Released: March 10, 2020; Label: Trinitee Urban Records; Format: digital download, online streaming	—	—	—	

=== Extended play ===
Title	Album details
Back Again	Released: June 26, 2018; Label: Music World Gospel; Format: digital download

== Singles ==
Title	Year	Peak chart positions				Album
Title	Year	US Gospel	US Gospel Digital	US Adult R&B	US R&B	Album
"God's Grace"	1998	23	—	6	32	Trin-i-tee 5:7
"Oh! Mary Don't You Weep"	1998	—	—	—	—	Trin-i-tee 5:7
"You Can Always Call His Name"	1998	—	—	24	—	Trin-i-tee 5:7
"Put Your Hands"	1999	—	—	—	—	Spiritual Love
"My Body"	2000	—	—	35	—	Spiritual Love
"There He Is"	2000	—	—	—	—	Spiritual Love
"Holla"	2002	—	—	—	—	The Kiss
"People Get Ready"	2002	—	—	—	—	The Kiss
"Lord"	2002	—	—	38	—	The Kiss
"Listen"	2007	9	—	—	89	T57
"I Will Lift"	2007	—	—	—	—	T57
"Get Away"	2007	—	—	—	—	T57
"Over and Over" (featuring PJ Morton)	2011	2	6	39	—	Angel & Chanelle
"Heaven Hear My Heart"	2011	—	10	32	—	Angel & Chanelle
"Bring Your Praise"	2011	28	—	—	—	Angel & Chanelle

== Album appearances ==
Year	Song	Album
2006	"Like U"	Gotta Have Gospel! - Gold!
2006	"God's Grace"	Gospo Classic, Vol. 2
2007	"Brahms Lullaby"	Baby Jamz Presents: Nursery Rhymes, Vol. 1
2007	"There Was an Old Lady That Lived in a Shoe"	Baby Jamz Presents: Nursery Rhymes, Vol. 1
2007	"The Christmas Song"	Music World Master Series: Holiday EP
2007	"O Holy Night"	Music World Master Series: Holiday EP
2007	"Grandma"	Spirit Rising, Vol. 1
2008	"Row, Row, Row Your Boat"	Music World Kids Presents Baby Jamz Nursery Rhymes, Vol. 2
2008	"Ring Around a Rosy"	Music World Kids Presents Baby Jamz Nursery Rhymes, Vol. 2
2008	"Three Blind Mice"	Music World Kids Presents Baby Jamz Nursery Rhymes, Vol. 2

== Music videos ==
Year	Song	Album
1998	"God's Grace"	Trin-i-tee 5:7
1998	"You Can Always Call His Name"	Trin-i-tee 5:7
1999	"Put Your Hands"	Spiritual Love
2000	"My Body"	Spiritual Love
2002	"Holla"	The Kiss
2007	"Listen"	T57
2008	"I Will Lift"	T57
2008	"Get Away"	T57
2011	"Over and Over"	Angel & Chanelle
2011	"Heaven Hear My Heart"	Angel & Chanelle
2011	"Bring Your Praise"	Angel & Chanelle
