= Chanel Haynes =

American singer (born 1978)

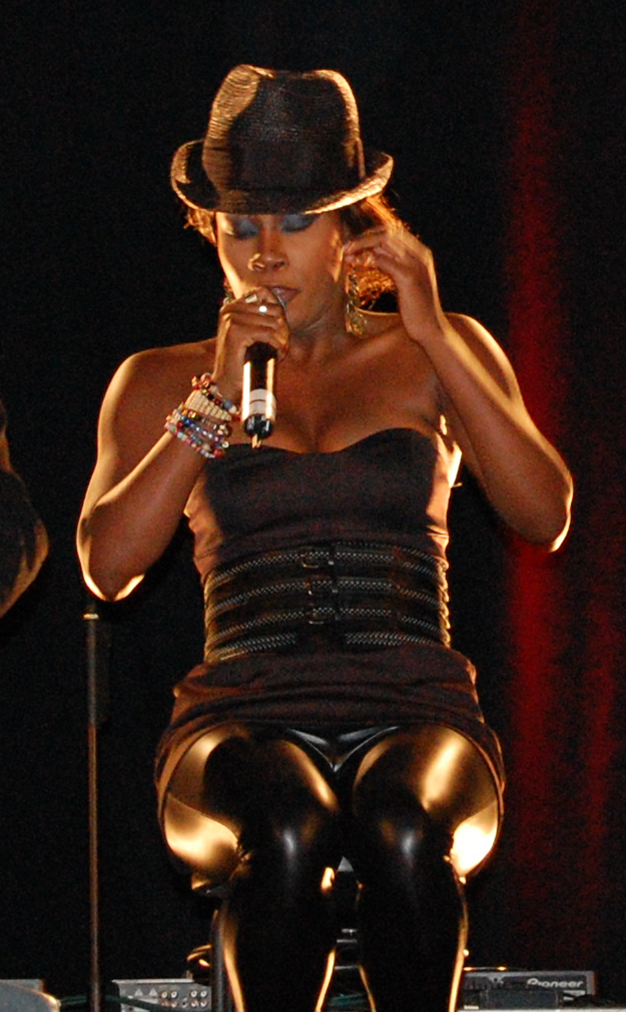
- Haynes performing alongside Trin-i-tee 5:7 in 2009
- Born: December 31, 1978 (age 46); New Orleans, Louisiana, U.S.
- Other names: Chanel, Chanel Haynes-Schwartz
- Occupations: Singer; songwriter; actress
- Musical career
- Genres: Gospel; R&B; pop
- Instrument: Vocals
- Labels: Obsidian; Music World Gospel; GospoCentric
- Formerly of: Trin-i-tee 5:7

Chanelle "Chanel" Haynes (born December 31, 1978) is an American singer-songwriter and actress. She rose to fame in the late 1990s as the lead singer of the gospel girl group Trin-i-tee 5:7, one of the most successful contemporary gospel acts of their era.

After the group disbanded, Haynes released her debut solo album, Trin-i-tee 5:7 According to Chanel (2014), which debuted at number twenty-five on the Billboard's Top Gospel Albums chart. Following the release of her solo album, Haynes pursued an acting career. In 2021, Haynes portrayed Tina Turner in the West End theatre production of Tina: The Tina Turner Musical.

== Early life ==
Chanelle Haynes was born and raised in New Orleans, Louisiana. Haynes participated in local singing competitions, often competing against her childhood friend and future group member Angel Taylor. In 1993, Haynes performed on Star Search. Kenneth Grant, a New Orleans–based entrepreneur and businessman, decided to put together a group. After hearing Haynes perform at his church Greater St. Stephen FGBC, Grant added her to his forthcoming group along with Angel Taylor and local singer Terri Brown. The ladies took on the group name "Trin-i-tee 5:7" based on 1 John 5:7 biblical scripture that refers to the Trinity. Managed by Kenneth Grant, the group secured a recording contract with GospoCentric Records in 1997.

== Career ==
=== 1998–2012: Trin-i-tee 5:7 ===
Trin-i-tee 5:7 released their self-titled debut album in the United States on July 14, 1998, which peaked number one on the Billboard's Top Gospel Albums chart. The album sold over seven hundred-thousand copies in the United States, becoming certified gold by the Recording Industry Association of America (RIAA). The album's lead single, "God's Grace", reached number six on the Billboard Adult R&B Songs and number thirty-two on the Billboard R&B/Hip-Hop Airplay. The group received five Stellar Award nominations, winning New Artist of the Year. The group continued their success with their success with the follow-up album Spiritual Love in 1999. After the release of their third album The Kiss, the group took a hiatus.

In 2007, the group reformed and released their fourth album T57, which won two Dove Awards and was nominated for a Grammy Award. They released their first Christmas album, Love, Peace, Joy at Christmas, on October 26, 2009. On May 31, 2011, Trin-i-tee 5:7 released their sixth studio album Angel & Chanelle. The album became their highest-charting album on Billboard's Top 200 chart, peaking at number twenty and number one the Gospel Albums chart.

In 2012, the group disbanded to focus on solo careers. Trin-i-tee 5:7 has sold more than 2.5 million records worldwide to date, and is recognized as one of the most successful contemporary gospel acts of their era.

=== 2013–2014: Trin-i-tee 5:7 According to Chanel ===
In September 2013, Haynes released her first solo single "Believe". The single peaked nineteen on Billboard's Hot Gospel Songs chart. In June 2014, Haynes released her debut solo album Trin-i-tee 5:7 According to Chanel on her own independent recording label Obsidian Records. The album peaked at twenty-five on Billboard's Top Gospel Albums chart. In August 2014, the album's second single "Repay" peaked at twenty-six on the Gospel Airplay chart.

=== 2015–2022: Theatre and acting debut ===
In July 2015, Haynes made her acting debut in Zach Theatre's musical revue Sophisticated Ladies. In November 2015, she appeared in Zach Theatre's production of A Christmas Carol. In 2016, she appeared as part of the diva ensemble in Zach Theatre's musical production of Priscilla, Queen of the Desert. In April 2017, Haynes starred as Billie Holiday in Zach Theatre's Lady Day at Emerson's Bar and Grill. Her performance won "Best Leading Actress in a Musical" at the B. Iden Payne Awards in 2018.

In 2020, Haynes auditioned for the role of Tina Turner in the Broadway production of Tina: The Tina Turner Musical but did not receive the role. She later auditioned for the lead role in the West End UK production and secured the role. Her performance garnered positive reviews. In December 2021, Haynes appeared on British music competition television series Walk the Line. In June 2022, Haynes performed "Gimme Shelter" alongside The Rolling Stones during their concert in Milan, Italy.

=== Since 2023: Touring with The Rolling Stones ===
In 2023, Haynes began touring as a backup vocalist for The Rolling Stones during their Hackney Diamonds Tour. The New York Times considered her the "breakout star" of the band's May 23, 2024 show at MetLife Stadium.

== Philanthropy ==
After Hurricane Katrina in 2005, Haynes co-founded the Trin-i-tee 5:7 Ambassador of Hope and Triumph Campaign to provide financial assistance to the colleges, hospitals, businesses, and churches. In addition to financial assistance, Haynes also donated her personal time to help uplift the hurricane victims' spirits. In 2008, Haynes took the campaign to Sacramento and Los Angeles, California, and Houston, Texas.

== Personal life ==
In 2013, Haynes married Gregory Schwartz. On February 18, 2018, Haynes gave birth to their first child, Alexander von Schwartz.

== Discography ==
=== Studio albums ===
List of studio albums, with selected chart positions
| Title | Album details | Peak chart positions |
| Title | Album details | US Gospel |
|---|---|---|
| Trin-i-tee 5:7 According to Chanel | Released: June 17, 2014; Label: Obsidian; CD, digital download | 25 |

=== Singles ===
| Title | Year | Chart positions | Album |
| Title | Year | US Gospel | Album |
|---|---|---|---|
| "Believe" | 2013 | 19 | Trin-i-tee 5:7 According to Chanel |
| "Repay" | 2014 | 25 | Trin-i-tee 5:7 According to Chanel |

== Theatre ==
List of acting performances in theatre
| Title | Year | Role | Notes | Ref. |
|---|---|---|---|---|
| Sophisticated Ladies | 2015 | The Soubrette | Supporting role | |
| A Christmas Carol | 2015–2017 | Mrs. Gilchrist | Supporting role | |
| Priscilla, Queen of the Desert | 2016–2017 | Diva ensemble | Supporting role | |
| Lady Day at Emerson's Bar and Grill | 2017 | Billie Holiday | Lead role | |
| Tina: The Tina Turner Musical | 2021–2022 | Tina Turner | Lead role | |

== Awards and nominations ==
| Year | Association | Category | Work | Result |
|---|---|---|---|---|
| 2018 | B. Iden Payne Awards | Best Leading Actress in a Musical | "Lady Day at Emerson's Bar and Grill" | Won |
