= Crystal Lewis discography =

- Studio albums: 17
- Extended plays: 6
- Live albums: 2
- Compilation albums: 7
- Singles: 34
- Video albums: 9
- Music videos: 22
- Christmas albums: 2
- Remix album: 1
- Band albums: 2
- Spanish albums: 7

The discography of contemporary Christian singer Crystal Lewis consists of sixteen studio albums, two live albums, twenty-five singles, two Christmas albums, one EP, two band albums, one remix album, eight Spanish albums and four compilation albums.

Her most recent Christian albums include Crystal Lewis (2015) and its Spanish re-recording Suéltalo (2017). In 2019, she released her first jazz effort Rhapsody (2019). In 2022, the single "I Can't Help It" was released from her newest album, Together We Can. In 2023, she released a series of four *A Seasonal Thing* EPs, ultimately compiled as an album in 2024.

== Studio albums ==
Year	Album details	Peak chart positions			Sales
Year	Album details	US	US Christian	Heat.	Sales
1987	Beyond the Charade: Released: 1987; Label: Frontline Records	—	32	—	
1989	Joy: Released: 1989; Label: Frontline Records	—	40	—	
1990	Let Love In: Released: 1990; Label: Frontline Records	—	5	—	
1992	Remember: Released: 1992; Label: Metro 1 Music	—	13	—	200,000+
1993	The Bride: Released: 1993; Label: Metro 1 Music	—	17	—	200,000+
1995	Hymns: My Life: Released: January 1995; Label: Metro 1 Music	—	14	—	100,000+
1996	Beauty for Ashes: Released: October 1996; Label: Metro 1 Music, Myrrh Records	—	5	—	RIAA (US): Gold; 500,000+
1998	Gold: Released: December 1998; Label: Metro 1 Music, Myrrh Records	—	11	—	100,000+
2000	Fearless: Released: May 16, 2000; Label: Metro 1 Music, GospoCentric, Interscope, Word	—	32	—	100,000+
2002	Holy, Holy, Holy: Released: June 2002; Label: Metro 1 Music	—	16	—	100,000+
2005	See: Released: 2005; Label: Metro 1 Music	—	34	—	100,000+
2006	Joyful Noise (Songs For Kids!): Released: April 2006; Label: Metro 1 Music	—	19	—	100,000+
2011	Plain and Simple: Released: June 7, 2011; Label: Metro 1 Music	—	—	—	
2015	Crystal Lewis: Released: September 11, 2015; Label: Metro 1 Music	—	—	—	
2019	Rhapsody: Released: August 23, 2019; Label: CLR	—	—	—	
2022	Together We Can: Released: May 13, 2022; Label: CLR	—	—	—	
2019	A Seasonal Thing: Released: April 5, 2024; Label: CLR	—	—	—	

== Live albums ==
Year	Album details	Peak chart positions			Sales
Year	Album details	US	Billboard Christian Albums	Heat.	Sales
1999	Live at The Woodlands: Released: December 1999; Label: Metro 1 Music	—	41	—	
2002	More Live: Released: March 2002; Label: Metro 1 Music	—	43	—	

== EPs ==
Year	Album details	Peak chart positions			Sales
Year	Album details	US	Christian Albums	Heat.	Sales
2009	Peace on Earth: Released: November 2009; Label: Metro 1 Music	—	—	—	
2020	Just Because: Released: March 20, 2020; Label: CLR	—	—	—	
2023	A Seasonal Thing...SPRING: Released: May 19, 2023; Label: CLR	—	—	—	
2023	A Seasonal Thing...SUMMER: Released: August 25, 2023; Label: CLR	—	—	—	
2023	A Seasonal Thing...FALL: Released: November 24, 2023; Label: CLR	—	—	—	
2020	A Seasonal Thing...WINTER: Released: February 16, 2024; Label: CLR	—	—	—	

== Christmas albums ==
Year	Album details	Peak chart positions			Sales
Year	Album details	US	Christian Albums	Heat.	Sales
2000	Holiday! A Collection of Christmas Classics: Released: October 2000; Label: Metro 1 Music	—	12	14	
2010	Home for the Holidays: Released: October 2010; Label: Metro 1 Music	—	—	—	

== Remix albums ==
Year	Album details	Peak chart positions			Sales
Year	Album details	US	Christian Albums	Heat.	Sales
1994	The Remix Collection: Released: 1994; Label: Metro 1 Music	—	—	—	

== Spanish albums ==
Year	Album details	Peak chart positions			Sales
Year	Album details	US	Christian Albums	Heat.	Sales
1992	Recuerda: Released: 1992; Label: Metro 1 Music	—	13	—	200,000+
1993	La Esposa: Released: 1993; Label: Metro 1 Music	—	17	—	200,000+
1995	Himnos De Mi Vida: Released: January 1995; Label: Metro 1 Music	—	14	—	100,000+
1996	La Belleza de la Cruz: Released: October 1996; Label: Metro 1 Music, Myrrh Records	—	23	—	100,000+
1998	Oro: Released: December 1998; Label: Metro 1 Music, Myrrh Records	—	11	—	100,000+
2003	Santo, Santo, Santo: Released: June 2003; Label: Metro 1 Music	—	16	—	100,000+
2003	Suéltalo: Released: August 1, 2017; Label: CLR	—	—	—	

== Band albums ==
Year	Album details	Peak chart positions			Sales
Year	Album details	US	Christian Albums	Heat.	Sales
1986	Wild Blue Yonder: Released: 1986; Label: Frontline Records	—	—	—	
1999	Attack of the Screamin’ Rays: Released: 1999; Label: Metro 1 Music	—	—	—	

== Compilation albums ==
Year	Album details	Peak chart positions		
Year	Album details	US	Christian Albums	Heat
1991	Simply the Best: Released: 1991; Label: Frontline Records	—	16	—
1995	Greatest Hits: Released: January 1995; Label: Metro 1 Music	—	—	—
1996	Best of the Harvest: Released: 1996; Label: Metro 1 Music	—	—	—
2000	Harvest 2000: Released: 2000; Label: Metro 1 Music	—	—	—
2000	La Coleccion: Released: May 16, 2000; Label: Metro 1 Music	—	32	—
2001	More: Released: October 2001; Label: Metro 1 Music	—	—	—
2013	Twenty Five: Released: December 2013; Label: Metro 1 Music	—	—	—

== DVDs and videos ==
Year	Title	Format
1985	Hi-Tops	VHS
1995	Crystal Lewis on Film	VHS
1996	Beauty for Ashes (LIVE)	VHS
1996	Milk Break: A Metro One Sampler, hosted by T-Bone	VHS
1997	One Voice: featuring Bryan Duncan, Anointed & Crystal Lewis	VHS
1998	Un Retrato Intimo: A Solas Con Crystal Lewis	VHS
1998	WOW 1999/Bio Videos	VHS
2001	More	DVD
2002	More Live	DVD
2003	Jesus Video (American Heroes Edition)	DVD

== Singles ==
- 1988: "You Didn't Have to Do It"
- 1992: "I Now Live"
- 1993: "The Mother & The Bride"
- 1995: "Come Just As You Are"
- 1995: "Shine Jesus Shine" (No. 1 CCM Dance)
- 1996: "People Get Ready...Jesus Is Comin'" (No. 1 CCM)
- 1996: "Beauty for Ashes" (No. 1 CCM)
- 1996: "The Beauty of the Cross" (No. 1 CCM)
- 1996: "God's Been Good To Me" (No. 1 CCM)
- 1996: "Lion and the Lamb"
- 1998: "Not the Same" (No. 1 CCM)
- 1998: "Lord I Believe in You" (No. 1 CCM)
- 1998: "Be With Him"
- 1999: "Lean on Me" / "Dyer Rd."
- 2000: "Only Fools"
- 2000: "Satisfied"
- 2000: "Trust Me"
- 2001: "Like a Child"
- 2001: "When God's People Pray"
- 2002: "His Eye Is on the Sparrow"
- 2002: "The Wisdom of Tenderness"
- 2005: "Learn to Fly"
- 2005: "Just Sing"
- 2016: "Beginning Again: The Remixes"
- 2017: "Bloom"
- 2017: "Angels We Have Heard On High"
- 2017: "Underneath the Mistletoe"
- 2018: "Dancing Through Tunnels"
- 2019: "It's Just Not Christmas (If You're Not Around)"
- 2020: "Let The Music Play"
- 2021: "STRS"
- 2022: "I Can't Help It"
- 2022: "Everybody Hurts"
- 2022: "She Was Here"

== Music videos ==
- 1992: "I Now Live (Remix)" featuring Peace 586 (aka MC Peace)
- 1996: "The Beauty of the Cross"
- 1996: "Beauty for Ashes" featuring Ron Kenoly
- 1996: "Esplendor Por Ceniza" featuring Marcos Witt
- 1998: "Lord, I Believe in You" (Remix)
- 1998: "Cristo Yo Creo En Ti" (Remix)
- 1998: "Lean on Me" features Kirk Franklin with Mary J. Blige, R. Kelly, Bono & Lewis
- 2000: "Trust Me"
- 2001: "More"
- 2002: "His Eye Is on the Sparrow"
- 2003: "Be the Light"
- 2015: "Love Each Other"
- 2015: "Faithful"
- 2017: "BLOOM"
- 2018: "Dancing Through Tunnels"
- 2020: "Sunrise"
- 2020: "Let The Music Play"
- 2020: "Maybe You Should Call Me"
- 2020: "Let Me Love You"
- 2021: "Just Like That"
- 2021: "STRS"
- 2023: "Endless Summers"
