= Campion =

Campion may refer to:

== Biology ==
- Campions, flowering plants in the genus Silene (carnation family, Caryophyllaceae), including:
  - Silene acaulis, moss campion
  - Silene coronaria rose campion
  - Silene dioica, red campion
  - Silene latifolia, white campion
  - Silene tomentosa, Gibraltar campion
  - Silene vulgaris, bladder campion
  - Silene stenophylla, narrow-leafed campion
  - Silene villosa, desert campion
- Sideridis rivularis, the campion, a moth of Europe and Asia
- Campion (lacewing), a genus of mantidfly in subfamily Mantispinae of family Mantispidae

== Education ==
- Campion College, Old Toongabbie, Australia
- Campion College, Kingston, Jamaica
- Campion College (Regina, Canada)
- Campion College, Gisborne
- Campion House College, Osterley, London
- Campion Hall, Oxford
- Campion School (disambiguation) (several)

== Fiction ==
- Albert Campion, a fictional detective created by English author Margery Allingham
- Campion Bond, a minor character in the comic versions of The League of Extraordinary Gentlemen
- Campion (Watership Down), a rabbit from the novel Watership Down by Richard Adams
- A protagonists of the Alastair Reynolds novel House of Suns
- A character in the HBO Max show Raised By Wolves

== People ==
- Edmund Campion (1540–1581), English Catholic Jesuit priest and martyr
- Michael Campion, various people
- Paul Campion (radio host) (1969-), Australian broadcast radio host
- Polly Campion, American politician
- Thomas Campion (1567 – 1621), English composer, poet, and physician

== Places ==
- Campion, Western Australia
- Campion Air Force Station, Alaska, United States
- Campion, Colorado, United States

== Sport ==
- Campion A.F.C., football team in Bradford, England

== Other uses ==
- Campion (surname)
- Campion (1989 TV series), a BBC television series (1989-1990)
- Campion (1959 TV series), a British mystery television series (1959-1960)
- Campion Cycle Company, a British maker of cycles, motorcycles and cars between 1901 and 1926
