= List of awards and nominations received by Trin-i-tee 5:7 =

Trin-i-tee 5:7 awards and nominations
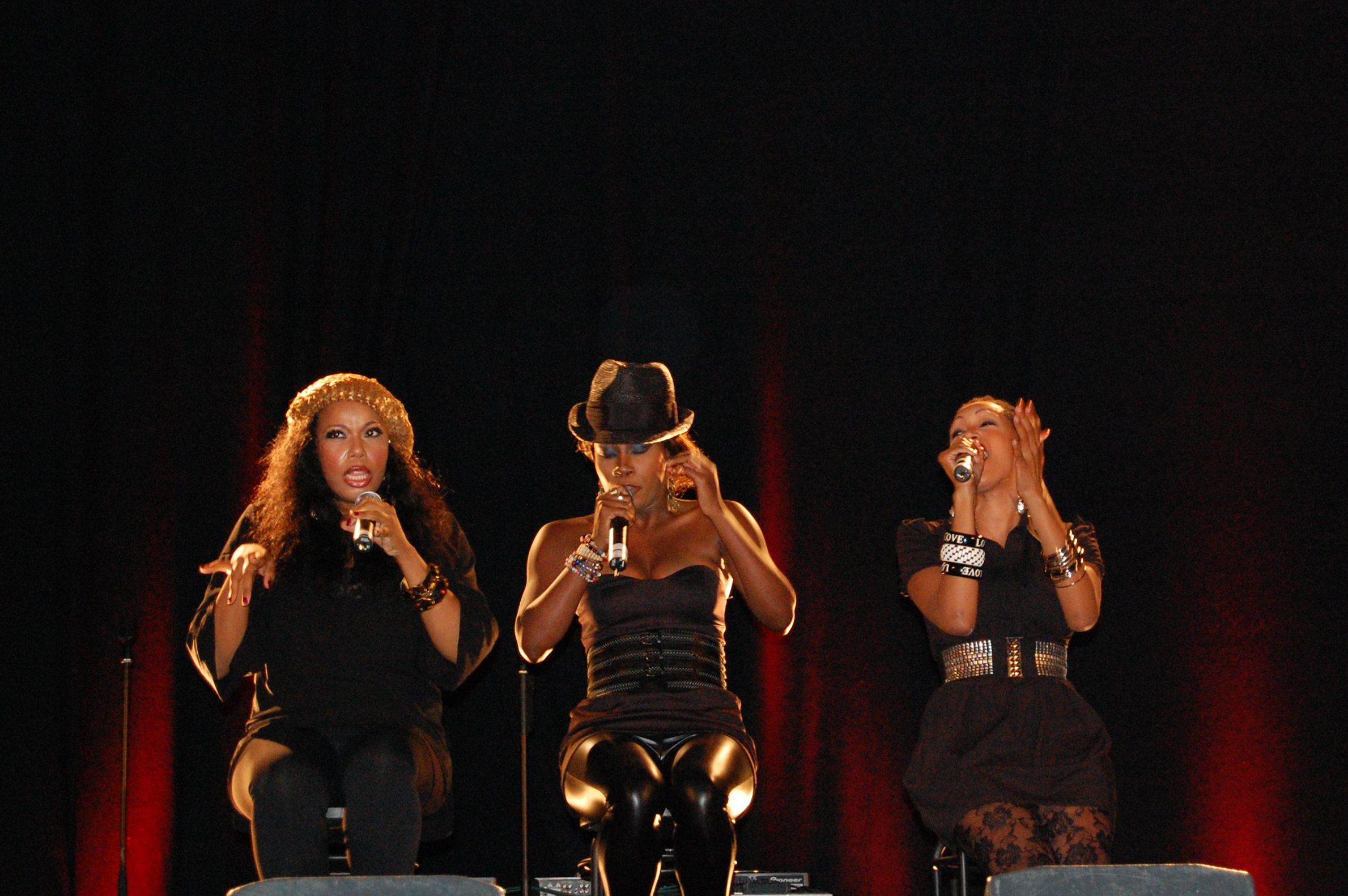
- Anderson, Haynes and Taylor performing in 2009
Awards and nominations
| Award | Wins | Nominations |
| Grammy | 0 | 2 |

Totals (Note: Certain award groups do not simply award one winner. They acknowledge several different recipients, have runners-up, and have third place. Since this is a specific recognition and is different from losing an award, runner-up mentions are considered wins in this award tally. For simplification and to avoid errors, each award in this list has been presumed to have had a prior nomination.)
- Wins: 5
- Nominations: 25

Trin-i-tee 5:7 is an American girl group formed in 1997. The original lineup composed of Chanelle Haynes, Angel Taylor, and Terri Brown-Britton. The group was launched into mainstream recognition following the release of their best-selling debut album, Trin-i-tee 5:7 (1998), which contained the top-charting gospel single "God's Grace". The album became certified gold. Despite critical and commercial success, the group experienced a lineup change when as Terri Brown left the group in 1999.

In mid-1999, Adrian Anderson was added to the group and they released their second album, Spiritual Love. In 2002, they followed up with the release of The Kiss. Their fourth album T57 (2007) earned a Grammy nomination for Best Contemporary R&B Gospel Album. The album spawned the top-charting singles: "Listen" and "Get Away". Following the departure of Anderson in 2011, Trin-i-tee 5:7 moved forward as duo and released their sixth album Angel & Chanelle.

Trin-i-tee 5:7 has sold more than two million records worldwide to date, and is recognized as one of the most successful contemporary gospel acts of their era. They were also ranked as the tenth Top Gospel Artist of the Year by Billboard, in 2002. Their work has earned them several awards and nominations, including two Dove Music Awards, one Stellar Award, two Grammy nominations, and two BET Award nominations.

== BET Awards ==
The BET Awards were established in 2001 by the Black Entertainment Television network to celebrate African Americans and other minorities in music, acting, sports, and other fields of entertainment. Trin-i-tee 5:7 has received 2 nominations.

| Year | Nominated work | Category | Result | Ref |
|---|---|---|---|---|
| 2008 | Trin-i-tee 5:7 | Best Gospel Artist | Nominated | |
| 2009 | Trin-i-tee 5:7 | Best Gospel Artist | Nominated | |

== Dove Awards ==
The Dove Awards are an accolade by the Gospel Music Association (GMA) of the United States to recognize outstanding achievement in the Christian music industry. The awards are presented annually.

| Year | Nominated work | Category | Result | Ref |
|---|---|---|---|---|
| 2003 | "Holla" | Urban Recorded Song of the Year | Nominated | |
| 2003 | The Kiss | Urban Album of the Year | Nominated | |
| 2003 | "Holla" | Short Form Music Video of the Year | Nominated | |
| 2008 | T57 | Urban Album of the Year | Won | |
| 2008 | "Listen" | Urban Recorded Song of the Year | Won | |
| 2012 | Angel & Chanelle | Urban Album of the Year | Nominated | |

== GMWA Awards ==
The GMWA Award of Excellence are an accolade by the Gospel Music Workshop Of America (GMWA) of the United States to recognize outstanding achievement in the Gospel music industry.

| Year | Nominated work | Category | Result | Ref |
|---|---|---|---|---|
| 1999 | Trin-i-tee 5:7 | Best New Artist | Won | |
| 1999 | Trin-i-tee 5:7 | Best New Artist Contemporary | Won | |
| 2000 | Spiritual Love | Group of the Year - Urban Contemporary | Nominated | |
| 2000 | Spiritual Love | Album of the Year - Urban Contemporary | Nominated | |

== Grammy Awards ==
| Year | Nominated work | Category | Result | Ref |
|---|---|---|---|---|
| 2008 | T57 | Best Contemporary R&B Gospel Album | Nominated | |
| 2012 | Angel & Chanelle | Best Gospel Album | Nominated | |

== MOBO Awards ==
The MOBO Awards (an acronym for Music of Black Origin) are held annually in the United Kingdom to recognize artists of any race or nationality performing music of black origin. Trin-i-tee 5:7 has received one nominations.

| Year | Nominated work | Category | Result | Ref |
|---|---|---|---|---|
| 2002 | Trin-i-tee 5:7 | Best Gospel Act | Nominated | |

== Soul Train Music Awards ==
The Soul Train Music Awards is an annual awards show that honors the best in African American music and entertainment. Trin-i-tee 5:7 has received 1 nomination.

| Year | Nominated work | Category | Result | Ref |
|---|---|---|---|---|
| 2011 | "Heaven Hear My Heart" | Best Gospel Performance | Nominated | |

== Stellar Awards ==
The Stellar Awards is an annual awards show in the US, honoring Gospel Music Artists, writers, and industry professionals for their contributions to the gospel music industry. Trin-i-tee 5:7 has been nominated fourteen times and won one award.

| Year | Nominated work | Category | Result | Ref |
|---|---|---|---|---|
| 1999 | Trin-i-tee 5:7 | Best New Artist | Won | |
| 1999 | Trin-i-tee 5:7 | Group/Duo of the Year | Nominated | |
| 1999 | Trin-i-tee 5:7 | Contemporary Group/Duo of the Year | Nominated | |
| 1999 | Trin-i-tee 5:7 | Contemporary CD of the Year | Nominated | |
| 1999 | "God's Grace" | Contemporary Song of the Year | Nominated | |
| 2001 | Trin-i-tee 5:7 | Group/Duo of the Year | Nominated | |
| 2001 | Trin-i-tee 5:7 | Contemporary Group/Duo of the Year | Nominated | |
| 2001 | Spiritual Love | Contemporary CD of the Year | Nominated | |
| 2001 | "Put Your Hands" | Music Video of the Year | Nominated | |
| 2004 | Trin-i-tee 5:7 | Group/Duo of the Year | Nominated | |
| 2004 | Trin-i-tee 5:7 | Contemporary Group/Duo of the Year | Nominated | |
| 2004 | The Kiss | Urban/Inspirational Performance of the Year | Nominated | |
| 2012 | Trin-i-tee 5:7 | Group/Duo of the Year | Nominated | |
| 2012 | Trin-i-tee 5:7 | Contemporary Group/Duo of the Year | Nominated | |
