= Campion (surname) =

Campion is a surname. Notable people with the surname include:

- Bill Campion (born 1952), American basketball player
- Carlo Antonio Campioni (born Charles Antoine Campion; 1720–1788), Italian composer
- Cassie Jackman (born 1972), English squash player, also known as Cassie Campion
- Denys Campion Potts (1923–2016), English academic
- Ed Campion (1915–2005), American basketball player
- Edith Campion (1923–2007), New Zealand actress, writer and co-founder of the New Zealand Players
- Édith Cresson (born Édith Campion; 1934), French politician
- Saint Edmund Campion SJ (1540–1581), English Jesuit and Catholic martyr
- Edmund Campion (historian) (born 1933), Australian priest and historian
- Gerald Campion (1921–2002), English actor
- Kevin Campion (rugby league) (born 1971), Australian rugby league player
- Jane Campion (born 1954), New Zealand film director
- John F. Campion (1848–1916), Irish-American mine owner, investor, and philanthropist
- John Joseph Campion (1963–2020), Irish-American businessman
- Maria Ann Campion (1777–1803), Irish actress
- Paul Campion (film director) (born 1967), English film director
- Paul Campion (French Navy officer) (fl. 1904), French admiral
- Paul Campion (radio host) (born 1969), Australian radio host
- Richard Campion (theatre director) (1923–2013), New Zealand theatre director
- Sarah Campion (1906–2002), pseudonym of Mary Rose Alpers, novelist and social activist
- Thomas Campion (1567–1620), English composer, poet, and physician
- T. J. Campion (1918–1996), American Football Player
- Vikki Campion, spouse of the 17th Deputy Prime Minister of Australia and 13th leader of the National Party Barnaby Joyce
- Sir William Campion (governor) KCMG (1870–1951), English politician and governor of Western Australia
- William Campion (1640-1702), MP for Kent
- William Campion (organist) (fl. 1543), English musician

== Fictional characters ==
- Albert Campion, fictional detective
- Charles D. Campion, character in The Stand

== See also ==
- Campion (disambiguation)
