= Spiritual Love =

Spiritual Love may refer to:

- Spiritual Love (album), a 1999 album by Trin-i-tee 5:7
- Spiritual Love (film), a 1987 film
- "Spiritual Love", a song by Urban Species, released in 1993
- "Spiritual Love", a song by S Club 7 (a cover of the Urban Species song), a B-side of the 2000 single "Never Had a Dream Come True"
