= Michael Campion (musician) =

American musician and entrepreneur

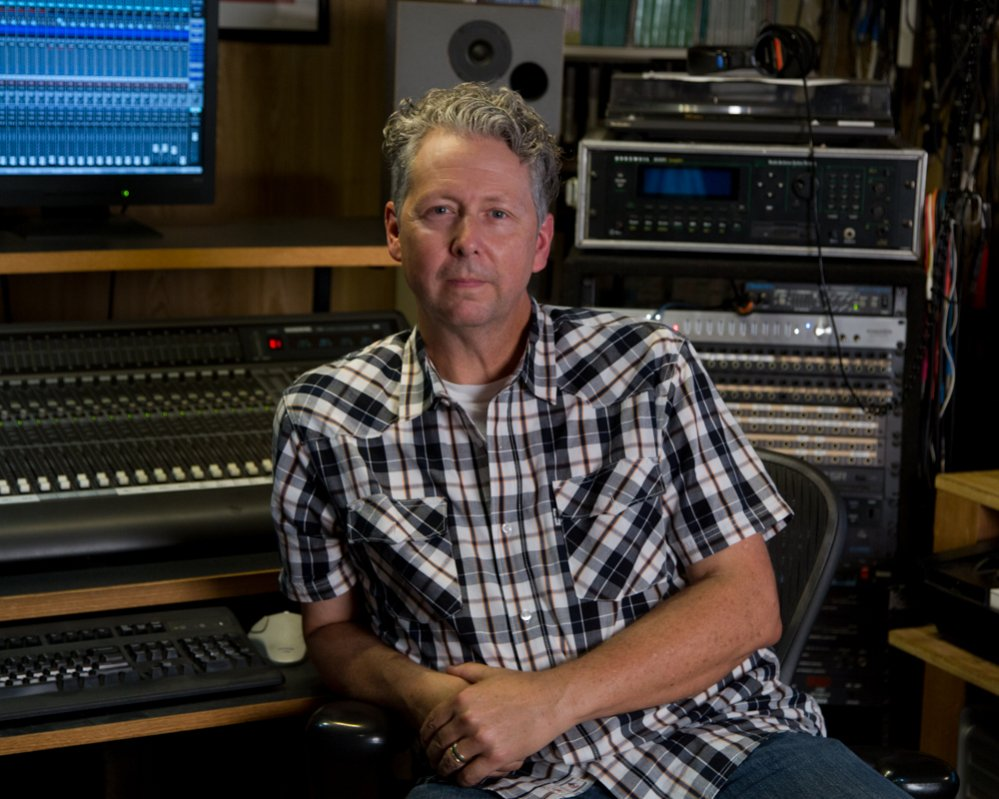
- Born: Michael John Campion; December 4, 1962 (age 63); Moses Lake, Washington
- Occupations: Record producer, Entrepreneur, Musician, Songwriter
- Known for: Co-founding a company that reintroduced the Danelectro brand
- Spouse: Lezlie Gibbs (m. 1988)
- Children: Kylie, Kalina and Kiana
- Website: musicepicenter.com, mediaepicenter.com

Michael John Campion (born December 4, 1962) is an American producer, entrepreneur, musician and songwriter. He is known for resurrecting the guitar company Danelectro.

== Early life ==
Michael Campion was born in Moses Lake, Washington. His family moved to Orange County, California, while he was in grade school. Campion formed a band called "Westbound" in middle school and started playing high school dances before he could drive. He produced his first record for his high school, when he was 17 years old.

== Career ==
=== Bands ===
In 1980, Campion formed "Surf City" (originally "The Surf City Boys"), a band focusing on the music of The Beach Boys and Jan and Dean. While playing at Knott's Berry Farm, he met John Stamos, who joined the band on stage. Stamos would later introduce Campion to The Beach Boys and Jan and Dean, with whom Campion would eventually tour. Through these events Campion met songwriting partner Randell Kirsch and joined forces for a duo project under the name of "C&K". Campion and Kirsch reunited in 2005 to release a gospel vocal album, under the name of "Feather".

=== Jingles ===
At a corporate gig, Campion was approached by Wild West Stores to produce a jingle for a television & radio campaign based on The Beach Boys #1 hit, I Get Around, with Campion's production and rewrite of the lyrics. Under the name of "Pacific Productions", Campion would spend the next couple of years writing and producing dozens of jingles and music campaigns, often calling upon the vocal talents of Beach Boys' band members like Jeffrey Foskett and Phil Bardowell.

=== L.A.B. Sound ===
In 1986 Campion bought into a boutique music store concept called "L.A.B. Sound" and opened a location in Orange County that strategically shared a wall with a recording studio owned by Frontline Records. Frontline dominated Christian radio in the late 80s and Campion contributed songs to several artists on their roster, including Crystal Lewis.

=== Danelectro ===
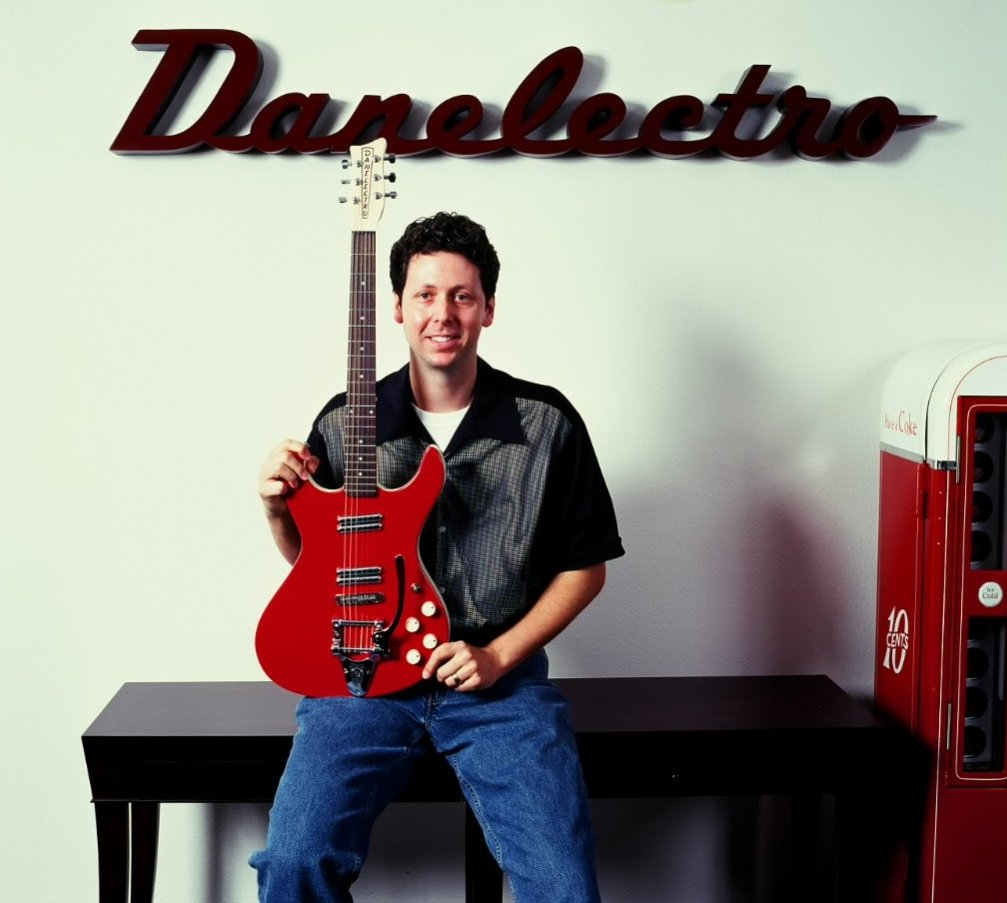

==== Musical Instruments ====
Campion met Steve Ridinger of EVETS Corporation in 1992. QWIK TUNE was the first project that they worked on together. The concept was to take Liquid-crystal display (LCD) technology and simulate the analog meters used in guitar tuners. Old school guitar tuners with analog meters ruled the MI industry in the early 90s (selling at around $100). QWIK TUNE selling at $19.95, was accurate and disruptive to the market. In recent years, QWIK TUNE rebranded as SNARK Tuners.

Campion and Ridinger then saw an opportunity to reproduce the sounds of the most sought after "vintage" guitar pedals, in an affordable package. Many names were considered, but "Danelectro" had a simplistic beauty, history and mystique.

Musicians had been deprived from Danelectro products for nearly 30 years, when Campion and Ridinger introduced 3 new pedals under the brand name, at the Winter NAMM Show, in 1997.

Dealers from all over the world ordered mass quantities, but their number one question was: When are you coming out with guitars? In a rapid, but thorough design and development effort, Danelectro released their first model of guitar, (a replica of the 1956 "U2"), exactly one year later The Danelectro U2 was embraced by the industry and the demand for additional models set the course for the years to follow.

===== Tonal Creations =====
Tonal Creations combined Campion's experience in guitar manufacturing with creative advertising, by producing custom shaped guitars for high-profile companies to use as branding and marketing instruments. Guitars in the shapes of everything from hamburgers to cartoon characters were produced for clients like Mars, Incorporated for M&M's.

=== Music Epicenter ===
Campion left Danelectro in 2002 and dove back into songwriting, placing songs in a few television shows, like One Tree Hill, through agencies that demanded to own the song's publishing, in exchange for their placement efforts. Feeling that this was unfair, Campion formed "Music Epicenter", with partner and mentor songsmith, Chris Falson in 2003.

Campion shifted focus from song placement to finding a solution for an industry in rapid decline. Lack of stable distribution channels for new artists, inspired Campion, along with ME partner Chris Falson and James Langteaux to create "PeaPod Music", where he raised capital and filed a patent on this unique distribution and discovery process.

=== The Raymies ===
The Raymies was a youth-based entertainment project created by Campion, in which he also served as musical director and executive producer. As the project evolved, he raised funds for a television pilot, which he co-produced with Brillstein Entertainment Partners and John Stamos. The lead singers were two of Campion's three daughters (Kalina and Kiana).

In their three years together, The Raymies performed over 100 live shows from Los Angeles to New York and recorded nearly 40 songs written by Campion. Several of the songs found their way into other television and film projects. An animated version of The Raymies was developed for the kid based, online, virtual world of JumpStart, whose Raymies followers grew from 200,000 to 2,000,000 during their two-year collaboration.

In 2011, Campion struck a deal with Rainbow S.r.l. to develop a musical television series with Nickelodeon as a platform for Kalina and Kiana's music career. Campion served as Co-creator and Music Supervisor of the series and wrote much of the music with his daughters. The show (recast) premiered in 2016 as Maggie & Bianca: Fashion Friends. and completed 78 episodes, (including guest appearances by Kalina & Kiana), over three seasons, airing internationally on Netflix, Nickelodeon and Disney.

=== Media Epicenter ===
Through experience gained from Maggie & Bianca, and having directed nearly two dozen music videos, Campion discovered a passion for storytelling beyond music, and launched his own production company - Media Epicenter, in late 2019. The launch was slowed by the COVID-19 pandemic, but the company is back on course and currently has eight film & TV projects in various stages of development, ranging from unscripted to interactive animation. Media Epicenter began production on two documentaries in late 2022 and will launch their first docu-reality series in 2023.

== Personal life ==
Campion married Lezlie Gibbs in 1988. Together they have three daughters: Kylie, Kalina and Kiana.

== Credits ==
=== Discography ===
- Love Is the Answer - Pacifica, 1980, Kitchen Records - Credited Role: Producer, Vocals, Guitar
- City Lights - Surf City, 1983, Nu-Surf Records - Credited Role: Producer, Vocals, Guitar, Keys, Writer for Summer in Huntington and Sandy
- Girl of My Dreams - Surf City, 1984, Graham Street Records - Credited Role: Producer, Vocals, Guitar, Keys, Writer for Girl of My Dreams, I Love You More, One Last Ride, Little Lady
- I Want You to Know - Crossfire, 1985, Graham Street Records - Credited Role: Engineer, Co-producer, Backing Vocals
- Beyond the Charade - Crystal Lewis, 1987, Frontline Records - Credited Role: Backing Vocals, Writer for Frustrated, Runnin', Let Them Know, Tonight
- United We Stand / Divided We Fall - Benny Hester, 1990, Frontline Records - Credited Role: Backing Vocals
- New Life - Sharlyn & Rick Green, 1991, Santa Catalina Records - Credited Role: Engineer, Producer, Backing Vocals, Guitar
- Greatest Hits (Crystal Lewis album) - Crystal Lewis, 1991, Frontline Records - Credited Role: Writer for Frustrated
- Rewards of Wisdom - Thunder Bay, 1992, Santa Catalina Records - Credited Role: Producer, Arranger, Programmer, Vocals, Guitar, Bass, Keys, Writer for Rewards of Wisdom
- Twelve & Twelve - Jeffrey Foskett, 1997, Pioneer LDC / New Surf, Ltd. - Credited Role: Backing Vocals, Writer for I Don't Know
- Near Life Experience - Randell Kirsch, 1999, Dental Records - Credited Role: Backing Vocals
- The Best of Jeffrey Foskett - Jeffrey Foskett, 2001, Pioneer / New Surf - Credited Role: Backing Vocals, Writer for I Don't Know
- Santa Cruz - Papa Doo Run Run, 2001, Blue Pacific Records - Credited Role: Writer for One Last Ride
- Fragile Sunrise - Jeff Larson, 2002, New Surf Records - Credited Role: Backing Vocals
- Blue Plate Special - Papa Doo Run Run, 2002, Blue Pacific Records - Credited Role: Writer for One Last Ride
- Swimming in the Make Believe - Jeff Larson, 2003, New Surf Records - Credited Role: Backing Vocals
- Cornerstone Christmas - Chris Falson & Friends, 2003, Music Epicenter - Credited Role: Producer, Vocals, Guitar
- One in a Million - Dennis Wilson Tribute, 2004, ESQ (Endless Summer Quarterly) - Credited Role: Producer, Vocals, Guitar, Writer for The Only Good Thing About Leavin' and I Wanted You to Know
- Prisoner of Hope - Chris Falson, 2004, Music Epicenter - Credited Role: Associate Producer, Backing Vocals, Acoustic Guitar
- Destiny's Calling (Soundtrack) - 2005 - Destiny Records - Credited Role: Producer, Composer
- Feather - Feather, 2005, Surrender Records - Credited Role: Producer, Vocals, Guitar, Writer of Psalm and Believin'
- Mariner's Christmas with Jeffrey Foskett & Michael Campion, 2005, Music Epicenter - Credited Role: Producer, Vocals, Guitar, Writer for Merry Christmas (Say What You Mean)
- Where Is She? (Soundtrack) - 2008 - Music Epicenter - Credited Role: Producer, Writer for Dance All Night
- Dance All Night - The Raymies, 2009, Music Epicenter - Credited Role: Producer, Writer for Too Soon to Tell, I Can't Wait, Nothin' Seems to Rhyme, Good Day, I Love You More, UP2U, You & Me, Dance All Night, Why Won't You Talk To Me, Someday, Tell Me
- Raymies Rules - The Raymies, 2009, Music Epicenter - Credited Role: Producer, Arranger, Writer for Dance All Night, Kalina, Where Are You?, UP2U, Things You Should Know, I Can't Wait, Too Soon to Tell
- The Raymies Christmas - The Raymies, 2009, Music Epicenter - Credited Role: Producer, Arranger, Writer for At Christmas Time
- Enough - LJCC Live, 2009, Bulldog Records - Credited Role: Producer, Vocals, Guitar
- Enough 2 - LJCC Live, 2010, Bulldog Records - Credited Role: Producer, Arranger, Vocals, Guitar, Additional Lyrics for Some Kind of Wonderful
- Cure Across The World - Cure Across The World, 2010, CATW Records - Credited Role: Producer, Vocals, Writer for UP2U
- My American Friend (Soundtrack) - 2011, Rainbow S.r.l. - Credited Role: Producer, Writer for Here We Go
- Spontaneity - Kylie Campion, 2011, Music Epicenter - Credited Role: Producer
- Places We Would Go - Rocky's Revival, 2012, Music Epicenter - Credited Role: Producer, Bass, Baritone, Writer for Places We Would Go, Breathe In, Breathe Out, Tastes Like Sin
- Winx Club: The Mystery Of The Abyss (Soundtrack) - 2014, Rainbow S.r.l. - Credited Role: Vocal Producer for We All Are Winx
- The Live Collection - Chris Falson, 2014, Sounds Dangerous - Credited Role: Vocals and guitar
- Blue Water Harmony - Blue Water Music Festival, 2015, Blue Water - Credited Role: Producer, Writer for Like a Child
- Newspaper Dream - Rocky's Revival, 2016, Music Epicenter - Credited Role: Producer, Guitar, Baritone, Writer for Newspaper Dream, It Takes One, With You, Like a Child
- Maggie & Bianca: Fashion Friends (Soundtrack) - 2016/2017, Rainbow S.r.l. - Credited Role: Music Supervisor, Producer, Guitar, Bass, Writer for Here We Go, I Can't Wait, Relationship Game, Inside Out, Over and Over Again, Love Is Hard (But It's Worth It), Sitting Next to Him
- Miraculous: Tales of Ladybug & Cat Noir "A Christmas Special" (Soundtrack) - 2016, ZAG Records - Credited Role: Producer, Writer for Miraculous Theme (Christmas Version), It's Gonna Be a Miraculous Christmas, My Christmas Wish
- Sympathetic Vibrations - Gary Griffin, 2017, ViVid Records - Credited Role: Writer for I Wanted You to Know and Pretend It Isn't There
- International Pop Overthrow - Volume 20, 2017, IPO Records - Credited Role: Executive Producer for It Had to Be You (Pre-release)
- Maggie & Bianca: Fashion Friends (Soundtrack Album) Come Le Star - 2017, Sony Music - Credited Role: Producer, Writer for Here We Go, Relationship Game
- Maggie & Bianca: Fashion Friends (Soundtrack) - 2017, Rainbow S.r.L. Credited Role: Producer, Writer for I Can't Wait, Inside Out
- Heathens - Kalina & Kiana, 2017, Music Epicenter - Credited Role: Producer
- Silent Night - Kalina & Kiana, 2017, Music Epicenter - Credited Role: Producer
- His Name Shall Be - (from the motion picture “The Annunciation”) Kalina & Kiana, 2018, Music Epicenter - Credited Role: Producer, Writer
- The Sound of Silence - Kalina & Kiana, 2018, Music Epicenter - Credited Role: Co-Producer
- That Girl's In Love - Kalina & Kiana, 2018, Music Epicenter - Credited Role: Co-Producer, Writer
- Say What You Want - Kalina & Kiana, 2018, Music Epicenter - Credited Role: Co-Producer, Writer
- Shame On Me - Kalina & Kiana, 2018, Music Epicenter - Credited Role: Co-Producer, Writer
- It Had To Be You - Kalina & Kiana, 2018, Music Epicenter - Credited Role: Co-Producer, Writer
- Songs for Social Change (Volume 2) Compilation, 2018, RAWA Records - Credited Role: Producer, Writer for It Takes One
- Maggie & Bianca: Fashion Friends (Soundtrack Album) Hands Up - 2018, Sony Music - Credited Role: Producer, Writer for Over and Over Again, Love Is Hard (But It's Worth It), Sitting Next to Him
- Kyren (Original Motion Picture Soundtrack) Cameron London, 2018, Kyren Records - Credited Role: Co-Producer, Writer for Say What You Want
- That Summer, Vol Two (Various Artists) - 2019, That Summer - Credited Role: Co-Producer, Writer for That Thing
- That Thing - Kalina & Kiana, 2019, Music Epicenter - Credited Role: Co-Producer, Writer
- Gold - Kalina & Kiana, 2019, Music Epicenter - Credited Role: Co-Producer, Writer
- She Is - Kalina & Kiana, 2020, Music Epicenter - Credited Role: Co-Producer, Writer
- Golden Age - Kalina & Kiana, 2020, Music Epicenter - Credited Role: Co-Producer, Writer
- Hungry Heart- Victoria Bailey, 2020, Rock Ridge Music - Credited Role: Vocal Producer
- Sunshine - Kalina & Kiana, 2021, Music Epicenter - Credited Role: Co-Producer, Writer
- Rider In The Rain- Victoria Bailey, 2021, Rock Ridge Music - Credited Role: Vocal Producer
- Something New - Kalina & Kiana, 2021, Music Epicenter - Credited Role: Co-Producer, Writer
- At Christmas Time (How Could He Do This To Me?) - Kalina & Kiana, 2021, Music Epicenter - Credited Role: Co-Producer, Writer
- Golden Age (Live) - Kalina & Kiana, 2022, Music Epicenter - Credited Role: Co-Producer, Writer
- Peter Pan Rd - Kalina & Kiana, 2022, Music Epicenter - Credited Role: Co-Producer, Writer

=== Jingles ===
Advertising: Television & Radio Commercials

Client	Project/Campaign	Year	Credited Role	Notes
Wild West Stores	"I Get Around"	1984	Producer, vocals, Keys, Writer	
Honda	"Love My Honda"	1985	Producer, vocals, guitar, Keys, Programming, Writer	
Toyota	"Get To Know The Park"	1985	Producer, vocals, guitar, Keys, Programming, Writer	
McCowen's Market Place	"Who Could Ask For More?"	1986	Producer, vocals, guitar, Keys, Programming, Writer	
Village Green, Los Angeles	"Meet Me On The Green"	1986	Producer, vocals, guitar, Keys, Programming, Writer	Vocals: Phil Bardowell
Toyota	"Toyota-Land"	1986	Producer, vocals, guitar, Keys, Programming, Writer	
Sunland Ski & Sports	"Fun & Fashion"	1986	Producer, vocals, guitar, Keys, Programming, Writer	Vocals: Laura Savitz
Honda	"Scootermania"	1987	Producer, vocals, guitar, Keys, Programming, Writer	
Operation Santa Claus	"It's Not A Gift You're Giving"	1987	Producer, guitar, Keys, Programming, Writer	Vocals: Laura Savitz
Gelson's Markets	"Greenhouse By Gelson's"	1987	Producer, guitar, Keys, Programming, Writer	
Honda	"Ride With A Winner"	1988	Producer, vocals, guitar, Keys, Programming, Writer	
Black Angus Steakhouse	"Theme"	1988	Producer, guitar, Keys, Programming, Writer	
Sunland Ski & Sports	"Take It To The Top"	1988	Producer, guitar, Keys, Programming, Writer	Vocals: Jeffrey Foskett
Yamaha Motor Company	"We'll Make You A Believer"	1988	Producer, vocals, guitar, Keys, Programming, Writer	
Bausch & Lomb	"Danger Zone"	1989	Producer, vocals, guitar, Keys, Programming, Writer	
Toyota	"Get The Max"	1989	Producer, vocals, writer	
The Orange County Register	"It's In The Register"	1989	Producer, vocals, guitar, Keys, Programming, Writer	
Century 21 Real Estate	"We Know The Game"	1990	Producer, vocals, guitar, Keys, Programming, Writer	
Rescue Rooter	"At Your Service"	1990	Producer, vocals, guitar, Keys, Programming, Writer	
Bupkis	"My Name Is Bupkis"	2012	Producer, vocals, guitar, Keys, Programming, Writer	

=== Film and television ===
Project	Year	Credited Role
LAB Systems	1989	Executive Producer
The Touch Company	1990	Executive Producer
One Tree Hill	2003	Composer
Punk'd	2004	Composer
Punk'd	2005	Composer
The Great American Christmas	2006	Performer
The Maxwell Multiple Climax	2007	Executive Producer and composer
According To Jim	2008	Composer
Where Is She?	2008	Executive Producer and composer
Legally Blondes	2009	Composer
Raymies Rules	2009	Executive Producer and composer
My American Friend (Pilot)	2011	Producer and composer
D.I.L.L.I.G.A.F.	2012	Composer
Winx Club: The Mystery Of The Abyss	2014	Vocal Producer
Maggie & Bianca: Fashion Friends	2016-2017	Music Supervisor and composer
Miraculous: Tales of Ladybug & Cat Noir "A Christmas Special"	2016	Producer and composer
The Annunciation	2018	Producer and composer
Big Shot	2021	Producer and composer

=== Music Videos ===
Song	Artist	Year	Credited Role	Link
UP2U	The Raymies	2009	Director	https://www.youtube.com/watch?v=HPqF3-g5oAs
Good Day	The Raymies	2009	Director	https://www.youtube.com/watch?v=pj2MroKc-Yg
Nothing Seems To Rhyme	The Raymies	2009	Director	https://www.youtube.com/watch?v=Yp1gRfMwHhQ
White Christmas	The Raymies	2009	Director	https://www.youtube.com/watch?v=oflRxSrfXSA
RaymieVision	The Raymies	2009	Director	https://www.youtube.com/watch?v=JhdkG-Bv6nU
Places We Would Go	Rocky's Revival	2013	Director	https://www.youtube.com/watch?v=Mk-S7c6pTdU
Salvation Mountain (Slab City)	Kylie Campion	2014	Director	https://www.youtube.com/watch?v=UdfHB4I7F3k
Silent Night	Rocky's Revival	2015	Director	https://www.youtube.com/watch?v=k_XwZtFxz3c
Lonesome Without You	Kylie Campion	2016	Director	https://www.youtube.com/watch?v=pU8LOs8qQbk
It's Gonna Be A Miraculous Christmas	Kalina & Kiana / Zag Animation	2016	Editor/Composer	https://www.youtube.com/watch?v=m5Gt52e7kiE
Heathens (Live)	Kalina & Kiana	2016	Director	https://www.youtube.com/watch?v=_E4gor4uq5E
Silent Night	Kalina & Kiana	2017	Director	https://www.youtube.com/watch?v=gYPFk0VaXDg
It Had To Be You	Kalina & Kiana	2018	Executive Producer, Composer	https://www.youtube.com/watch?v=MXHa8KeLqSs
Say What You Want	Kalina & Kiana	2018	Executive Producer, Composer	https://www.youtube.com/watch?v=V-MzkgqD8kg
That Girl's In Love	Kalina & Kiana	2018	Director, composer	https://www.youtube.com/watch?v=XPnkG0aoHyk
That Thing	Kalina & Kiana	2019	Director, composer	https://www.youtube.com/watch?v=R-nt2ZuYVtU
Gold	Kalina & Kiana	2019	Director, composer	https://www.youtube.com/watch?v=7Ytntdoq8N4
She Is	Kalina & Kiana	2020	Director, composer	https://www.youtube.com/watch?v=IeytBmNRrrk
Golden Age	Kalina & Kiana	2020	Director, composer	https://www.youtube.com/watch?v=CLyuBwiRhq4
Summertime Sadness (Live)	Kalina & Kiana	2020	Director	https://www.youtube.com/watch?v=dPjFVgTAAoM
Sunshine (Lyric Video)	Kalina & Kiana	2021	Director, composer	https://www.youtube.com/watch?v=9S9fQ8r9YYs
Something New (Lyric Video)	Kalina & Kiana	2021	Director, composer	https://www.youtube.com/watch?v=RFAgAf3zMZc
At Christmas Time (How Could He Do This To Me?)	Kalina & Kiana	2021	Director, composer	https://www.youtube.com/watch?v=7Z0aDWCBj5o
That Thing (TouchMix Sessions) LIVE	Kalina & Kiana	2021	Executive Producer, Composer	https://www.youtube.com/watch?v=i6BW7TFMHDM
