= Paul Campion =

Paul Campion may refer to:

- Paul Campion (radio host) (born 1969), Australian radio host
- Paul Campion (French Navy officer), French admiral
- Paul Campion (film director) (born 1967), English/New Zealand film director
