= Campion School =

Campion School may refer to:

== England ==
- Campion School, Bugbrooke
- The Campion School, Hornchurch
- Campion School, Leamington Spa

== Greece ==
- Campion School (Athens)

== India ==
- Campion School, Mumbai
- Campion School, Bhopal
- Campion Anglo-Indian Higher Secondary School, Trichy

== United States ==
- Campion High School, Wisconsin
- Campion Academy, Loveland, Colorado
