= Fearless (Crystal Lewis album) =

Studio album by Crystal Lewis
- Released: May 16, 2000
- Studios: Jasmine Sound (Laguna Beach, California); Fredonia International (Hollywood, California); New Earth (Laguna Niguel, California); Royaltone (North Hollywood, California); SARM West Coast (Bel Air, California); Velvet Elvis (Laguna Niguel, California)
- Genre: CCM
- Length: 58:08
- Labels: Metro 1 Music; GospoCentric; Interscope; Word
- Producers: Brian Ray; Kirk Franklin; Rhett Lawrence

Crystal Lewis chronology
Gold (1998)	Fearless (2000)	Holy, Holy, Holy (2002)

Singles from Fearless
- 1. "Only Fools" Released: 2000; 2. "Satisfied" Released: 2000; 3. "Trust Me" Released: 2000

Fearless is the ninth studio solo album by American singer and songwriter Crystal Lewis, released through Metro 1 Music, GospoCentric, Interscope, and Word Records on May 16, 2000. With elements of Contemporary Christian music (CCM), adult contemporary, and Christian pop, it features guest appearance from Rahsaan Patterson, T-Bone, and J-Raw (of Priesthood). Fearless was nominated for a Grammy Awards in 2001.

== Recording and release ==
Fearless was recorded at Jasmine Sound in Laguna Beach, California; Fredonia International in Hollywood, California; New Earth Studios and Velvet Elvis in Laguna Niguel, California; Royaltone Studios in North Hollywood, California; and SARM West Coast Studios in Bel Air, California. Metro 1 Music, GospoCentric, Interscope, and Word Records released the album on May 16, 2000. In 2001, it was nominated for a Grammy Awards.

== Composition ==
Fearless incorporates Contemporary Christian music (CCM), adult contemporary, and Christian pop sounds. It includes the Kirk Franklin-penned "I Still Believe" which previously made its first appearance on a Christmas soundtrack album Touched by an Angel. "Trust Me" features background vocals from Rahsaan Patterson, while Christian rappers T-Bone and J-Raw (of Priesthood) appear on the song "What a Fool I've Been". Featuring synthesizer, "Only Fools" is a newer version from the original one from Lewis's album Remember.

== Critical reception ==
Professional ratings
Review scores
Source	Rating
AllMusic	2/5 stars

Ashleigh Kittle of AllMusic described Fearless as a blend of CCM, adult contemporary, and Christian pop built around Lewis's trademark "big voice". Although she considered it weaker than her previous albums Beauty for Ashes and Gold, she highlighted "I Still Believe", "Kiss & Tell", and the re-recording of "Only Fools" as standouts. Kittle praised the former for its prominent beat and slow, determined feel, while noting the electric-guitar-driven sound of "Kiss & Tell" and the synth-based reworking of "Only Fools".

== Track listing ==
Fearless track listing
No.	Title	Writer(s)	Length
1.	"Reach Out"	Crystal Lewis; Brian Ray	4:08
2.	"Satisfied"	Lewis; Jyro Xhan	4:55
3.	"Trust Me"	Lewis	5:01
4.	"Only Fools"	Ray	4:25
5.	"I Still Believe"	Kirk Franklin	3:58
6.	"One Man."	Ray	4:45
7.	"Fearless"	Lewis; Ray	6:05
8.	"Kiss and Tell"	Lewis; Chris Lizotte; Jana Mashonee; Kevin Jarvis; Shawn Tubbs	4:30
9.	"What a Fool I've Been"	Ray; T-Bone; J-Raw	5:04
10.	"I Will Go"	Lewis; Ray	5:48
11.	"Change My Heart"	Lewis	4:41
12.	"My Friend"	Lewis	4:48
Total length:			58:08

== Personnel ==
- Crystal Lewis – vocals, backing vocals, BGV arrangements
- Jyro Xhan – keyboards, programming
- Rich Nibble – guitars
- Tim Pierce – guitars
- Andy Prickett – guitars
- Shawn Tubbs – guitars
- Nathan East – bass
- Elijah Thompson – bass
- Vinnie Colaiuta – drums
- John Andrew Schreiner – string arrangements
- Wayne Rodrigues – vinyl manipulation
- Trina Broussard – backing vocals
- Sherree Ford-Payne – backing vocals
- Rahsaan Patterson – backing vocals
- Kirk Franklin – spoken vocals (5), BGV arrangements
- T-Bone – rap (9)
- J-Raw – rap (9)

Production

- Crystal Lewis – executive producer
- Brian Ray – producer (1–4, 6–12)
- Kirk Franklin – producer (5)
- Rhett Lawrence – producer (5), mixing
- Keith Kutcha – engineer
- Steve MacMillan – engineer, mixing
- Lee Manning – engineer
- Scott Osborne – engineer
- Chris Wonzer – engineer
- Jyro Xhan – engineer
- Chris Lord-Alge – mixing
- Dave Pensado – mixing
- Gavin Lurssen – mastering at The Mastering Lab (Hollywood, California)
- Chris Lizzote – project coordinator
- Daniel Fairbanks – art direction, layout
- Sonya Koskoff – photography
- Garren Tolkin – make-up
