= Jackie McCullough =

Bishop Jackie McCullough
- Also known as: Rev. Dr. Jacqueline E. McCullough
- Born: Jacqueline E. Phillips; January 14, 1950 (age 76); Kingston, Jamaica
- Origin: New York City
- Genres: Gospel, traditional black gospel, urban contemporary gospel
- Occupations: Bishop, pastor, singer, songwriter, pianist
- Instruments: Vocals, singer-songwriter, piano
- Years active: 1998–present
- Labels: Zomba, GospoCentric
- Website: bethrapha.org preciousjems.org

Bishop Jacqueline E. "Jackie" McCullough (born January 14, 1950) is the founder and Pastor of The International Gathering at Beth Rapha. Bishop McCullough is also an author and a gospel musician. Her first album, This Is for You Lord, was released by Zomba and GospoCentric Records in 1998. This was a Billboard magazine breakthrough release upon the Gospel Albums and Christian Albums charts.

== Early life ==
McCullough was born in Kingston, Jamaica, on January 14, 1950, as Jacqueline E. Phillips. She is the daughter of minister parents, who relocated her to New York City as a child. She was a registered nurse at Harlem Hospital Center, while she had aspirations of a medical career, potentially becoming a medical doctor in Pediatrics. At this time, she was in a domestically violent relationship with her now ex-husband, and during this timeframe she had a baby, but the baby did not survive.

== Education and philanthropy ==
McCullough would use these trials, as an impetus to further her walk with the Lord. She went on to postgraduate study at the Jewish Theological Seminary of America. Her Master's degree was earned at New York University in Philosophy. She was bestowed her Doctorate degree in Ministry by Drew University. She pastors and founded, The International Gathering at Beth Rapha that is located in Pomona, New York, along with being the President and founder of a non-for-profit, JEM Ministries. McCullough serves as the Founding President of Beth Rapha Christian College and Theological Seminary, which is in Tampa, Florida.

== Author ==
Bishop McCullough has authored 4 books: 105 Days of Prayer; Satisfaction of the Soul, a devotional entitled Daily Moments with God: in Quietness and Confidence; and her latest book, The Other Side of This, released in August 2012 from her own publishing company, Bright Light Publishing.

== Music career ==
Her music recording career commenced in 1998, with her album, This Is for You Lord, and it was released by Zomba Records and GospoCentric Records on October 20, 1998. This album placed upon two Billboard magazine charts the Gospel Albums at No. 11 and Christian Albums at No. 33. She released a second CD "The New Sound" –

- Christian & Gospel, Music, Spoken Word, Gospel
- Released: January 1, 2010
- ℗ 2010 Precious JEM Music

== Discography ==
List of studio albums, with selected chart positions
Title	Album details	Peak chart positions	
Title	Album details	US Chr	US Gos
This Is for You Lord	Released: October 20, 1998; Label: Zomba, GospoCentric; CD, digital download	33	11
