= Natalie Wilson =

- Born: Natalie Simmons; September 23, 1971 (age 54); Newark, New Jersey, U.S.
- Genres: Christian R&B; gospel; traditional black gospel; urban contemporary gospel; contemporary R&B
- Occupations: Singer; songwriter
- Instruments: Vocals; singer-songwriter
- Years active: 2000–present
- Labels: Interscope Records; GospoCentric Records

Natalie Wilson (born September 23, 1971, as Natalie Simmons), is an American gospel musician and artist. She began her music career in 2000, with the release of Girl Director on Interscope Records. It was on the Top Gospel Albums and the Top R&B Albums charts. Her second album, Good Life, was released in 2003 by GospoCentric Records. The album charted on the two aforementioned charts.

== Early life ==
Wilson was born on September 23, 1971, in Newark, New Jersey, to Bishop Nathaniel Simmons and Johnnie Mae Simmons Nathaniel Simmons started Sounds of Praise Pentecostal Fellowship Ministries, Inc., and was the pastor of St. Paul's Church; he died in 1999. Her brother, Glenn, was supposed to take the helm and lead the choir, but died in 1992. Her father asked her to be the church choir's leader, which she did instead of pursuing an occupation in cosmetology. She has another brother, Bishop Wayne Andre', and two sisters, Stacey and Takesha.

== Music career ==
Wilson's music career started in 2000, with the release of Girl Director by Interscope Records on October 3, 2000. It was No. 8 on the Gospel Albums chart, No. 50 on the R&B Albums chart, No. 39 on the Heatseekers chart, and No. 22 on the Top Christian Albums chart. She released, Good Life, on October 7, 2003, with GospoCentric Records. The album reached No. 12 on the Gospel Albums chart and No. 83 on the R&B Albums chart. Cross Rhythms rated the albums and the first received a nine out of 10, while the second received only a five out of 10 review.

== Personal life ==
Wilson was married to Joseph "Joe" Wilson. She is the maternal aunt of Latrelle.

== Discography ==
=== Studio albums ===
List of studio albums, with selected chart positions
| Title | Album details | Peak chart positions | |
| Title | Album details | US Gos | US R&B |
|---|---|---|---|
| Girl Director | Released: October 3, 2000; Label: Interscope Records; CD, digital download | 8 | 50 |
| Good Life | Released: October 7, 2003; Label: GospoCentric Records; CD, digital download | 12 | 83 |
