= Michael Campion =

Michael Campion may refer to:

- Michael Campion (footballer) (born 1984), Filipino-Hong Kong football midfielder
- Michael Campion (musician), American songwriter, music producer and entrepreneur
- Michael A. Campion, professor of management
- Michael Campion (actor) (born 2002), American actor who played Jackson Fuller in Fuller House
