= Holla: The Best of Trin-i-tee 5:7 =

Greatest hits album by Trin-i-tee 5:7
- Released: June 26, 2007
- Recorded: 1998–2002
- Genre: Gospel, R&B
- Label: GospoCentric
- Producer: Chanelle Haynes, Angel Taylor, Adrian Anderson

Trin-i-tee 5:7 chronology
The Kiss (2002)	Holla: The Best of Trin-i-tee 5:7 (2007)	T57 (2007)

Professional ratings
Review scores
Source	Rating
Allmusic	3.5/5 stars

Holla: The Best of Trin-i-tee 5:7 compiles the greatest hits of the gospel group Trin-i-tee 5:7. The album charted at #17 on Top Gospel charts, #45 on the Top Christian, and #70 on the Top R&B charts. It was released five years after their third studio album, and three months prior to the group's fourth studio album.

== Track listing ==
1. Put Your Hands
2. God's Grace
3. Holla (Urban Remix)
4. With A Kiss
5. There He Is (featuring Kirk Franklin)
6. People Get Ready
7. Dance Like Sunday
8. My Body
9. I Promise You (featuring Crystal Lewis)
10. Highway (featuring Tramaine Hawkins)
11. God's Blessing
12. Mary Don't You Weep
