= Trin-i-tee 5:7 =

American gospel group

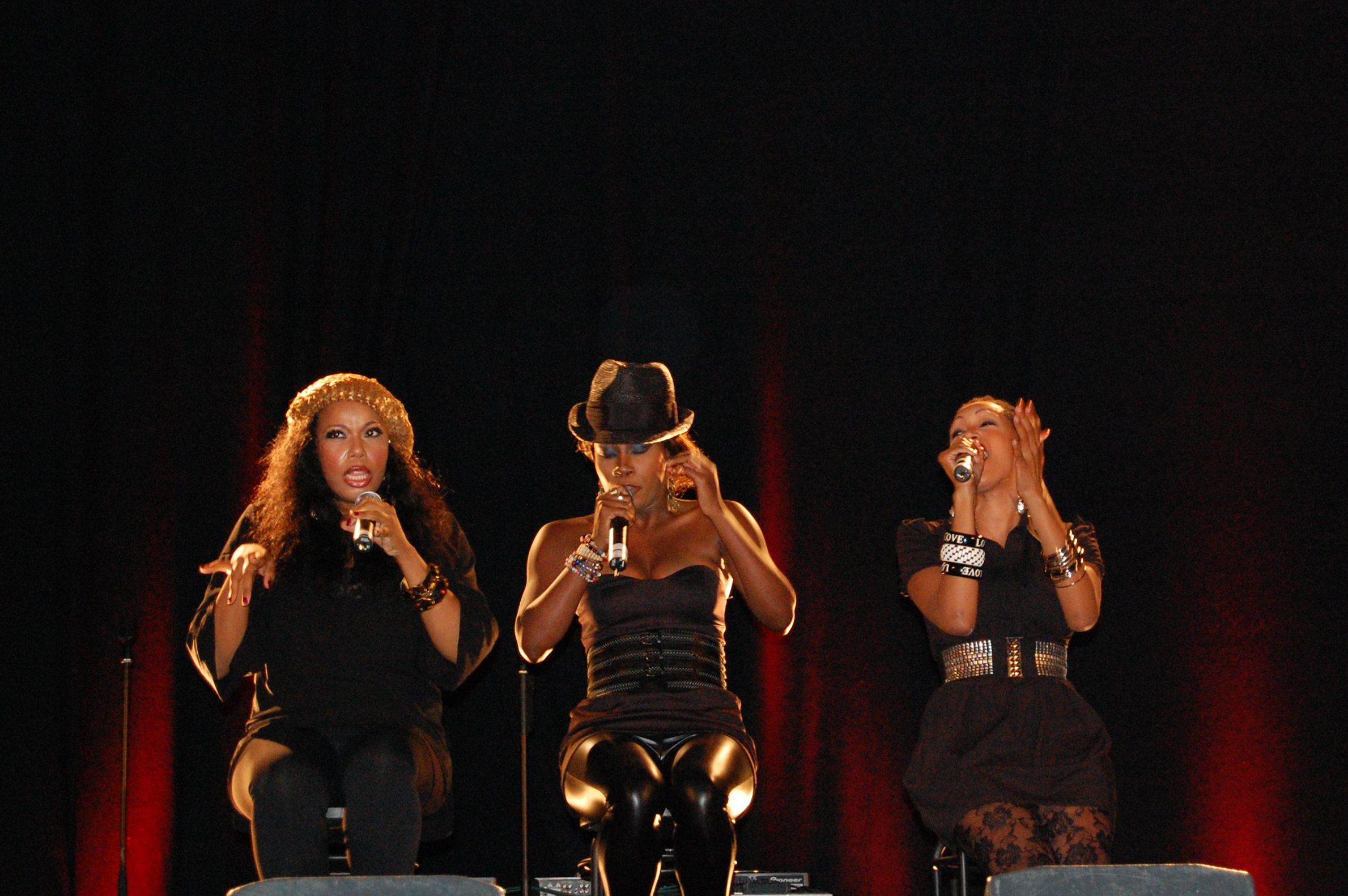
- Anderson, Haynes and Taylor performing in 2009

Background information
- Origin: New Orleans, Louisiana, U.S.
- Genres: Gospel, R&B
- Years active: 1997–2013
- Labels: Music World Gospel, GospoCentric
- Past members: Chanelle Haynes; Angel Taylor; Adrian Anderson; Terri Brown

Trin-i-tee 5:7 was an American gospel girl group formed in 1997. The original lineup composed of Chanelle Haynes, Angel Taylor, and Terri Brown. The group was launched into mainstream recognition following the release of their best-selling debut album, Trin-i-tee 5:7 (1998), which contained the top-charting gospel single "God's Grace". The album became certified gold. Despite critical and commercial success, the group experienced a lineup change when Terri Brown left the group in 1999.

In mid-1999, Adrian Anderson was added to the group and they released their second album, Spiritual Love. In 2002, they followed up with the release of The Kiss. Their fourth album, T57 (2007), earned a Grammy nomination for Best Contemporary R&B Gospel Album. The album spawned the top-charting singles: "Listen" and "Get Away". Following the departure of Anderson in 2010, Trin-i-tee 5:7 moved forward as a duo and released their sixth album Angel & Chanelle (2011).

Trin-i-tee 5:7 has sold more than 2.5 million records worldwide to date, making them one of the top selling gospel artists, and is recognized as one of the most successful contemporary gospel acts of their era. They were also ranked as the tenth Top Gospel Artist of the Year by Billboard, in 2002 and 2011. Their work has earned them several awards and nominations, including two Dove Music Awards, one Stellar Award, two Grammy nominations, and two BET Award nominations.

== History ==
=== 1997–1998: Formation and early years ===
Original members Angel Taylor and Chanelle Haynes were born and raised in New Orleans, Louisiana, where they attended high school together. Haynes and Taylor both participated in local singing competitions, often competing against each other. Kenneth Grant, a New Orleans–based entrepreneur and businessman, decided to put together a group. After hearing Haynes perform at his church, Greater St. Stephen FGBC, Grant added her to his forthcoming group. Taylor, coincidentally a friend of Haynes, would later be added to the group. Grant also added Terri Brown, a local singer in his church. The ladies took on the group name "Trin-i-tee 5:7" based on 1 John 5:7 biblical scripture that refers to the Trinity. Managed by Kenneth Grant, the group secured a recording contract with GospoCentric Records in 1997.

=== 1998–2000: Trin-i-tee 5:7 and Spiritual Love ===
Trin-i-tee 5:7 released their self-titled debut album in the United States on July 14, 1998, featuring productions by R. Kelly, Kirk Franklin, Percy Bady, Kevin Bond, Buster & Shavoni, Soulshock & Karlin. Trin-i-tee 5:7 peaked at number one on the Billboard's Top Gospel Albums and number twenty on the Billboard Top R&B/Hip-Hop Albums. It managed to sell over 700,000 copies in the United States, being certified gold by the Recording Industry Association of America (RIAA). The album's lead single, "God's Grace", reached number six on the Billboard Adult R&B Songs and number 32 on the Billboard R&B/Hip-Hop Airplay. Its follow-up single, "Oh! Mary Don't You Weep" failed to reproduce the success of "God's Grace". Meanwhile, the group featured on a song "As Long As You're With Me" from the soundtrack album of the animated epic musical film The Prince of Egypt. In 1998, Trin-i-tee 5:7 received five Stellar Award nominations, winning New Artist of the Year.

After the success of their debut album, Trin-i-tee 5:7 re-entered the studio quickly, bringing in a new lineup of producers, including Fred Jerkins III and Travon Potts. However, Terri Brown defected from the group to focus on her new marriage as well as a solo career. Adrian Anderson, a makeup artist for Gospocentric, was added to the group in mid-1999. Coming up with Spiritual Love, they released it on December 28, 1999, and it eventually became their breakthrough album. Spiritual Love peaked at number five on the Billboard Top Christian Albums chart and debuted at number one on the Gospel albums chart in early 2000. "Put Your Hands" was released in 1999 as the album's lead single. The main key to the group's breakthrough was the album's second single, "My Body", which charted the Billboard Adult R&B Songs at number thirty-five. Despite the positive message of the "My Body", the song was met with much controversy. The successful release of the singles bolstered the album's sales, eventually selling over one million copies worldwide.

=== 2002–2003: The Kiss ===
By the time the group's The Kiss was released in 2002, they were having problems with GospoCentric. The urban radio track "Holla" didn't get the urban radio push they felt the song merited and failed to make it on the R&B Charts. During that period Kenneth Grant left his post as the group's manager, and they sought to be released from their recording contract, but the label refused.

R&B star Brandy's mother and manager, Sonja Norwood, took over management and brought the group to a higher level of mainstream respect by booking them on major non-gospel television shows. However, she eventually turned the management over to Mathew Knowles.

=== 2004–2009: T57 ===
After a lengthy hiatus, the group was finally released from GospoCentric and Knowles signed them to Spirit Rising, the gospel music division of his Music World Entertainment record label. In 2007, GospoCentric released their first greatest hits album Holla: The Best of Trin-i-tee 5:7. Their fourth studio album, T57, was released the same year. T57 charted at No. 2 on the Gospel charts and #102 on the Billboard 200. The lead single, "Listen" charted at No. 9 on the U.S. Gospel charts. The group later embarked on their The Sisters In Spirit tour. In September 2008, a deluxe edition of T57 was released featuring three additional songs including the single "Get Away" which the group performed at BET's annual Celebration of Gospel. The album won two Dove Awards and was nominated for a Grammy Award.

After the release of T57, the group began doing individual projects. Chanelle pursued an acting career. Angel Taylor became the co-host for the short-lived BET's 106 & Gospel, which premiered January 11, 2009, and lasted for only one season. Adrian Anderson along with Soulfruit appeared on Spirit Rising's Pastor Rudy Experience album. They released their first Christmas album, Love, Peace, Joy at Christmas, on October 26, 2009.

=== 2010–2012: Anderson's departure and Angel & Chanelle ===
In October 2010, Anderson left the group and launched her own beauty line Halo Tu Beauty, leaving Haynes and Taylor to continue on as a duo. In February 2011, Trin-i-tee 5:7 released "Over and Over", the lead single from their forthcoming album. The single, which featured singer PJ Morton, peaked at number two on the Hot Gospel Songs chart. On May 31, 2011, Trin-i-tee 5:7 released their 6th studio album Angel & Chanelle. The album became their highest charting album on Billboard's Top 200 chart, peaking at number 20 and number one the Gospel Albums chart. In May 2011, "Heaven Hear My Heart" was released as the second single, peaking at number ten on the Gospel Digital Song Sales chart. "Bring Your Praise" was released in October 2011 and peaked at number 28 on the Hot Gospel Songs chart.

== Disbandment and aftermath ==
In 2013, Trin-i-tee 5:7 released their second greatest hits album, Trin-i-tee 5:7 Hits, as they announced that they would pursue solo careers. In September 2013, Chanel released her first solo single, "Believe". The single peaked at number 19 on Billboard's Hot Gospel Songs chart. In February 2014, Taylor released her first solo single, "Weak", an R&B-pop song, on her own recording label Taylor Made Music. Her follow-up single "Still God" was released later that year. In 2017, she released two singles "Everything" and "Nobody Better". In July 2014, Chanel released her debut solo album, Trin-i-tee 5:7 According to Chanel, on her own independent recording label Obsidian Records. The album peaked at 25 on Billboard's Top Gospel Albums chart. In August 2014, the album's second single "Repay" peaked at 26 on the Gospel Airplay chart.

On June 26, 2018, the group released an eight-song extended play, Back Again. In March 2020, a compilation album Story of My Life was released, which featured unreleased and leftover songs from previous albums. In September 2022, Taylor performed on-stage with former member Terri Brown at the Gospel Brunch Concert at City Winery.

== Artistry ==
=== Musical style and themes ===
Trin-i-tee 5:7 recorded gospel songs with styles that encompasses urban, contemporary, and R&B. In the group's original line-up, lead vocals were equally shared amongst the members, with Haynes as the group's contralto, Brown as the group's mezzo-soprano, and Taylor as the group's soprano. After a lineup change, Haynes became the primary lead vocalist, Taylor became the second lead vocalist, and Anderson, who sang soprano, often ad-libbed and alternated verses with Haynes. Trin-i-tee 5:7 cited R&B singer Whitney Houston as one of their influences. The Lakeland Ledger described Trin-i-tee 5:7's unique blend of gospel, R&B, hip-hop as "spiritually uplifting". In the same publication, the article noted that the sound that defines Trin-i-tee 5:7, aside from contemporary genre influences, is the group "sings about love that won't hurt you, a lover that will never leave you, the best love anyone, male or female, could have: God's grace." Haynes, however, completely led songs like "I Still Love You" and "Reflection". The group explored their lyrics to man-to-woman relationship, sisterhood and female empowerment anthems. With Haynes' and Taylor's wide role assumed in the production of Spiritual Love, the group's musical content delve into more personal lyrics which often receive criticism. In an interview with Gospel Flava, Haynes acknowledged that the group experienced much controversy for songs like "My Body" and "What He Wants" despite its true message.

=== Public image ===
Trin-i-tee 5:7 have often been described as a Christian version of Destiny's Child and the contemporary gospel vocal equivalent of En Vogue, both of whom are top-selling female groups of the 1990s. Lead singer Haynes has often drawn comparisons to R&B singer Toni Braxton for her smokey contralto voice.

Trin-i-tee 5:7 have often described their image as "fashionable young women who are ambassadors for Christ." Despite their positive image, the group have also experienced heavy criticism and controversy within the Christian community for their style of outfits and appearance. Haynes also remarked that the group have also experienced controversy for their off-stage appearance. However, Alex Henderson of All Music Guide noted that "In terms of image, Trin-i-tee 5:7 favor a look that is stylish and even sexy but not slutty or trashy—they wear makeup and attractive clothing, but they don't go out of their way to exploit their sex appeal."

== Philanthropy ==
In December 2000, Adrian Anderson founded a non-profit organization called the Be an Angel: Wear Your Halo Foundation in Sacramento, California. The foundation provided assistance to low-income and financially struggling families. The organization also distributes "care packages", which contained items including telephone cards, gift cards from supermarkets and retail stores, bath and body products, snack foods for kids, and household items. The Be an Angel: Wear Your Halo Foundation also provided knapsacks under their "Bag of Knowledge" program for college students.

After Hurricane Katrina in 2005, Trin-i-tee 5:7 founded the Trin-i-tee 5:7 Ambassador of Hope and Triumph Campaign to provide financial assistance to the colleges, hospitals, businesses, and churches. In addition to financial assistance, they also donated their personal time to help uplift the hurricane victims' spirits. In 2008, Trin-i-tee 5:7 took the campaign to Sacramento and Los Angeles, California, and Houston, Texas.

== Discography ==
- 1998: Trin-i-tee 5:7
- 1999: Spiritual Love
- 2002: The Kiss
- 2007: T57
- 2009: Love, Peace, Joy at Christmas
- 2011: Angel & Chanelle

== See also ==
- List of awards and nominations received by Trin-i-tee 5:7
