= Crystal Lewis (album) =

Studio album by Crystal Lewis
- Released: September 11, 2015
- Studios: New Monkey (Van Nuys, California); El Casino (Long Beach, California); The Bamboo Room (Altadena, California); Lightning Rod (Kalispell, Montana)
- Length: 45:26
- Label: Metro 1
- Producers: Elijah Thompson; Peace 586

Crystal Lewis chronology
Twenty Five (2013)	Crystal Lewis (2015)	Suéltalo (2017)

Crystal Lewis is the fourteenth studio album by Crystal Lewis. Metro 1 Music released it on September 11, 2015, which was the same day as her birthday. Elijah Thompson and Peace 586 produced the album's songs.

== Critical reception ==
Professional ratings
Review scores
Source	Rating
CCM Magazine	4/5 stars
The Christian Beat	3.5/5 stars
Cross Rhythms	9/10 squares
The Phantom Tollbooth	4/5

Awarding the album four stars from CCM Magazine, Andy Argyrakis states, "Lewis is firmly planted in the here and now." Andrew Wallace, indicating in a nine out of ten review by Cross Rhythms, describes, "A fresh, invigorating listen from an artist still relevant and at the top of her game."

Bert Saraco, rating the album a four out of five at The Phantom Tollbooth, writes, "her self-titled project is a very strong performance full of funk and power, with every word of every lyric plumbed for all its worth." Giving the album three and a half stars for The Christian Beat, Sarah Baylor says, "This record has an uplifting and soulful vibe that leaves you wanting to listen to the album again and again."

== Track listing ==
No.	Title	Writer(s)	Length
1.	"Be Alright" (featuring Anthony Evans)	Crystal Lewis, Jonathan Korszyk, Michael Wofford	3:21
2.	"Faithful"	Crystal Lewis	5:22
3.	"Love Each Other"	Crystal Lewis, Jonathan Korszyk, Michael Wofford	3:35
4.	"Let Go"	Crystal Lewis	4:06
5.	"In Your Name (For Your Glory)" (featuring Christon Gray)	Crystal Lewis, Christon Gray, Izzy Ray	4:28
6.	"Move On"	Izzy Ray	3:43
7.	"Beginning Again"	Crystal Lewis, Jonathan Korszyk, Michael Wofford	4:00
8.	"Seat at the Table"	Crystal Lewis, Chris Lizzote	3:23
9.	"Run"	Crystal Lewis, Peace 586	4:04
10.	"I Will Sing"	Crystal Lewis, Izzy Ray, Jared Rich, Blaine Stark	4:29
11.	"Brave"	Izzy Ray	4:59
Total length:			45:26

== Personnel ==
- Crystal Lewis – vocals
- Jimmy Wallace – keyboards (1–3, 6–8, 11)
- David Vandervelde – clavinet (1–3, 6–8, 11), guitars (1–3, 6–8, 11)
- Elijah Thompson – synthesizers (1–3, 6–8, 11), guitars (1–3, 6–8, 11), bass (1–3, 6–8, 11), bell tree (1–3, 6–8, 11)
- Joel Goodwin – keyboards (4), synth bass (4)
- Blaine Stark – Hammond B3 organ (10), programming (10), additional guitars (10)
- Jared Rich – additional keyboards (10)
- James Raymond – acoustic piano (11)
- Shawn Tubbs – guitars
- Nic Rodriguez – bass (4, 5, 9, 10)
- Frank Lenz – drums (1–3, 6–8, 11), percussion (1–3, 6–8, 11), horn arrangements (8)
- Peace 586 – drum beats (4, 5, 9, 10)
- Phil Krawzak – baritone saxophone (8)
- Mark Visher – saxophones (8)
- Tim Rubottom – trumpet (8)
- Anthony Evans – vocals (1)
- Lauren Evans – backing vocals (2, 8)
- Keri Larson – backing vocals (2, 8)
- Brandon Winbush – backing vocals (2, 8)
- Christon Gray – vocals (5)
- Izzy Ray – backing vocals (6)

Production

- Elijah Thompson – producer (1–3, 6–8, 11), recording (1–3, 6–8, 11), mixing (1–3, 6–8, 11)
- Peace 586 – producer (4, 5, 9, 10)
- Nic Rodriguez – recording (4, 5, 9, 10), mixing (4, 5, 9, 10)
- Gavin Lurssen – mastering at Lurssen Mastering (Hollywood, California)
- Andy Prickett – music mentor, advisor
- Devan Flaherty – artwork
- Denise Bovee – photography
- Stanley Hudson – stylist
