= Silene villosa =

Scientific classification
- Kingdom: Plantae
- Clade: Tracheophytes
- Clade: Angiosperms
- Clade: Eudicots
- Order: Caryophyllales
- Family: Caryophyllaceae
- Genus: Silene
- Species: S. villosa

Binomial name
- Silene villosa Forssk.

Species of flowering plant

Silene villosa, the desert campion, is a therophyte and an annual plant of the family Caryophyllaceae and genus Silene. It has ascending and spreading branches of around 50 cm. It blooms from February to April and its flowers are white, tubular, and solitary.
