= Spiritual Love (album) =

Studio album by Trin-i-tee 5:7
- Released: December 28, 1999
- Genres: Urban contemporary gospel, Gospel, R&B
- Length: 63:30
- Label: GospoCentric
- Producers: Armando Colon; Gerald Isaac; Fred Jerkins III; R. Kelly; Robert Smith; Joe "Flip" Wilson

Trin-i-tee 5:7 chronology
Trin-i-tee 5:7 (1998)	Spiritual Love (1999)	The Kiss (2002)

Spiritual Love is the second studio album by American gospel group Trin-i-tee 5:7. It was released by GospoCentric on December 28, 1999 in the United States. The album features collaborations with gospel artists such as Kirk Franklin, Tramaine Hawkins, Crystal Lewis, and Natalie Wilson of the S.O.P Chorale. Spiritual Love spawned the singles, "Put Your Hands", "I Promise", "My Body" and "There He Is".

== Critical reception ==
Professional ratings
Review scores
Source	Rating
AllMusic	3/5 stars
Cross Rhythms	9/10
USA Today	3/4 stars

AllMusic editor Steve Huey rated the album three ouf of five stars. He felt that Spiritual Love "features a number of fine moments that equal the best of their debut; the juxtaposition of sexy, slinky, urban R&B grooves with non-secular subject matter still seems a bit odd – form not matching up with content – but Christian music fans will be happy to have a sound they enjoy with the messages they respect." Mike Rimmer from Cross Rhythms wrote: "Here's an album that's full of soulful sounds and hot licks. There's also plenty of talent making guest appearances as Tramaine Hawkins and Crystal Lewis add their mighty vocals to the proceedings." Billboard critic Michael Paoletta felt that the "threesome's sophomore effort builds on its smash debut with a diverse but totally cohesive set that highlights the group's range and command of multiple genres.

== Commercial performance ==
The album reached number one on the US Top Gospel Albums and number five on the Top Christian Albums. It also peaked at number 41 on Billboard's Top R&B/Hip-Hop Albums and number 174 on the Billboard 200.

== Track listing ==
Spiritual Love track listing
No.	Title	Writer(s)	Producer(s)	Length
1.	"Put Your Hands"	Angel Taylor; Chanelle Haynes; Armando Colon; Gene MacLellan; Len Ron Hanks; Z. Grey	Colon	3:51
2.	"My Body"	Travon Potts	Colon	4:34
3.	"Spiritual Love"	Potts	Colon	3:26
4.	"Imagine That"	Fred Jerkins III; LaShawn Daniels	Jerkins	4:32
5.	"Interlude: Tribute"		Jerkins; Robert Smith	0:39
6.	"Highway" (with Tramaine Hawkins)	Walter Hawkins	Joe "Flip" Wilson	4:44
7.	"Gonna Get Myself Together"	Gerald Isaac	Isaac	5:24
8.	"There He Is" (featuring Kirk Franklin)	R. Kelly	Kelly	5:28
9.	"How You Living"	Wilson; Melvin Smith; Natalie Wilson; Talyor; Natalie Wilson; Haynes; Taylor; Adrian Anderson	Wilson	4:15
10.	"I Promise You" (featuring Crystal Lewis)	Mark Hammond; Robin Scoffield	Jerkins	4:07
11.	"You Were There"	Jerkins; Daniels	Jerkins	3:37
12.	"We Know"	Taylor; Haynes; Colon	Colon	3:40
13.	"The Day You Came"	Jerkins; Daniels	Jerkins	4:56
14.	"Interlude: Prayer"		Colon	1:20
15.	"If They Only Knew"	Taylor; Haynes; Colon; Kirk Franklin	Colon	4:27
16.	"Y'all Put Your Hands"	Angel Taylor; Chanelle Haynes; Armando Colon; Gene MacLellan; Len Ron Hanks; Z. Grey; Toni Braxton; Kenneth Edmonds; Bryce Wilson	Colon; Kenny M^{[a]}	4:28
Total length:				63:30

Notes

- ^{^[a]} denotes remix producer(s)

Sample credits

- "Put Your Hands" embodies portions of "Put Your Hand in the Hand" and contains elements from "Back In love Again."
- "If They Only Knew" contains elements of "Hold Me Now" by Kirk Franklin.
- "Y'all Put Your Hands" embodies elements from of "You're Makin' Me High" by Toni Braxton.

== Charts ==
Weekly chart performance for Spiritual Love
Chart (2000)	Peak position
US Billboard 200	174
US Top Christian Albums (Billboard)	5
US Top Gospel Albums (Billboard)	1
US Top R&B/Hip-Hop Albums (Billboard)	41
