= The Kiss (album) =

Studio album by Trin-i-tee 5:7
- Released: June 25, 2002
- Genres: Urban contemporary gospel, R&B, Neo soul
- Length: 59:19
- Label: GospoCentric
- Producers: Big Bert; Myron Butler; Shep Crawford; Dawkins & Dawkins; Darren "Limitless" Henson; Carvin "Ransum" Haggins; Darren "Limitless" Henson; Fred Jerkins III; PAJAM; Travon Potts

Trin-i-tee 5:7 chronology
Spiritual Love (1999)	The Kiss (2002)	Holla: The Best of Trin-i-tee 5:7 (2007)

The Kiss is the third studio album by American gospel group Trin-i-tee 5:7. It was released on June 25, 2002 through GospoCentric in the United States. Featuring production by PAJAM, "Uncle Freddie" Jerkins and Myron Butler, "musically, The Kiss is urban contemporary/neo-soul with hip-hop elements, but lyrically", the album "is gospel". Described as "promoting Christianity" in a non-"divisive" manner, the album features lyrical input from the group themselves.

A critical success, the album also fared well commercially, peaking at number two on the US Billboard Top Gospel Albums, number three on the Top Christian Albums chart, number fifteen on the Top R&B/Hip-Hop Albums chart and number eighty-five on the Billboard 200.

== Critical reception ==
Professional ratings
Review scores
Source	Rating
AllMusic	3/5 stars
Cross Rhythms	10/10 stars

The Kiss received positive reviews from critics. Alex Henderson of AllMusic praised the "vocal power" of the group, commenting that they could "hold their own against most of urban contemporary's secular female vocal groups". Henderson also compared The Kiss, musically, to the works of "secular female vocal groups" such as "Destiny's Child, Brownstone, En Vogue" and "TLC", in that it "is urban contemporary/neo-soul with hip-hop elements", but was keen to stress that "it does combine an urban contemporary/neo-soul groove with a gospel message". Henderson also commended "the expressive singers" for not being "in-your-face" or "divisive" about explaining "why Christianity works for them", going on to describe The Kiss as "a pleasing example of how Christian-oriented lyrics can be relevant to 21st century R&B". Anne Adams of Cross Rhythms gave a particularly favorable review of The Kiss. Rating the album ten-out-of-ten, Adams noted “Holla” (which she described as "infectious"), “Dance Like Sunday”, “People Get Ready”, “The One For Me” and “All Of My Life” as being "standout songs".

== Commercial performance ==
The Kiss proved to be Trin-i-tee 5:7's greatest commercial success on the US albums charts. It became the group's first album to chart within the top 100 half of the Billboard 200, peaking at eighty-five. Considerably more successful on the Billboard component charts, the album also became Trin-i-tee's highest charting on the Billboard Top R&B/Hip-Hop Albums chart, where it peaked at number fifteen. Though peaking at number two on the Billboard Top Gospel Albums chart, it failed, however, to match the success of the group's self-titled debut album which topped the chart in 1998. The album was also a success on the Top Christian Albums chart, where it peaked at number three.

== Track listing ==
The Kiss track listing
No.	Title	Writer(s)	Producer(s)	Length
1.	"Holla" (Urban Remix)	James Moss; Paul Allen	PAJAM	3:12
2.	"Lord"	Carvin "Ransum" Haggins; Andre Harris; Taalib Johnson	Harris; Haggins	4:44
3.	"With a Kiss"	Shep Crawford	Crawford	4:16
4.	"Dance Like Sunday"	Fred Jerkins III; LaShawn Daniels	Jerkins	3:59
5.	"What He Wants" (Interlude)		Dawkins & Dawkins	0:59
6.	"What He Wants"	Eric Dawkins; Anson Dawkins	Dawkins & Dawkins	4:27
7.	"People Get Ready"	Curtis Mayfield	Darren "Limitless" Henson; Keith Pelzer	4:14
8.	"Sixteen Again" (Interlude)	Angel Taylor; Adrian Anderson; Chanelle Haynes	Henson; Pelzer	1:15
9.	"Sixteen Again"	Taylor; Anderson; Haynes; Henson; Pelzor	Henson; Pelzer	4:24
10.	"The One for Me"	Taylor; Henson; Pelzor	Henson; Pelzer	4:48
11.	"Rescue Me"	Travon Potts	Potts	3:12
12.	"Here 4 U"	Myron Butler; Jerome Allen; Daria Clark	Butler	3:41
13.	"I Wish"	Robert Smith; Daniels; Haynes	Big Bert	3:55
14.	"Greater than You and Me"	Haynes; Henson; Pelzor	Henson; Pelzer	4:54
15.	"All of My Life"	Smith; Anderson	Big Bert	3:52
16.	"Holla"	Moss; Allen	PAJAM	3:26
Total length:				59:19

Notes

- "People Get Ready" is a cover of the same-titled Curtis Mayfield song - originally recorded by The Impressions.
- "Lord" is based on and heavily interpolates "Love" by Musiq Soulchild.

== Charts ==
Weekly chart performance for The Kiss
Chart (2002)	Peak position
US Billboard 200	85
US Top Christian Albums (Billboard)	3
US Top Gospel Albums (Billboard)	2
US Top R&B/Hip-Hop Albums (Billboard)	15
