= Campion Academy =

Location
- 300 42nd St SW; Loveland, Colorado 80537; United States
- Coordinates: 40°20′54″N 105°5′21″W

Information
- School type: Private college preparatory school
- Denomination: Seventh-day Adventist
- Established: 1907
- Status: Open
- Authority: Rocky Mountain Conference of Seventh-day Adventists
- CEEB code: 051445
- High school principal: Kaleb Leeper
- Grades: 9-12
- Gender: Co-ed
- Enrollment: 115
- Colors: Blue and white
- Athletics: Men's and women's varsity and junior varsity
- Mascot: Cougar
- Yearbook: Mountain Echoes
- Website: http://www.campion.net

Campion Academy is a Seventh-day Adventist boarding school located in Loveland, Colorado, offering college preparatory courses to grades 9-12. The school offers dual enrollment courses, vocational courses, a music program, interscholastic sports, and a work-study program, as well as an English language learner program for international students. Campion is a part of the Seventh-day Adventist education system, the world's second largest Christian school system.

== Accreditation ==
Campion Academy is accredited by the Adventist Accrediting Association (AAA and the CTC, the National Council for Private School Accreditation (NCPSA), and the Middle States Association of Colleges and School Commissions on Elementary and Secondary Schools (MSACS).

== History ==
Founded in 1907 on land donated by William A. Hankins, a homesteader who filed a claim in the 1880s, Campion Academy was founded in order to train young people to spread the gospel at home and around the world. The first school year opened to 29 students attending grades 1-9, in spite of no desks and little other equipment. Throughout the Great Depression and World Wars I and II, the school grew thanks to dedicated families and local church members who helped raise money, build, and work at the school. By 1963, enrollment had grown to 339 students.

Located between Loveland and Berthoud, Colorado, the academy's location along the railroad allowed it to develop industries at which students could work and help pay part of their tuition. Some of the industries included Silver State Plastics (1960), Harris Pine Mills (1962), and Rhodes Bake-N-Serve (1966). Today, students still participate in a work-study program in both on- and off-campus jobs.
