= Greatest Hits (Crystal Lewis album) =

Crystal Lewis' Greatest Hits

Greatest hits album by Crystal Lewis
- Released: January 24, 1995
- Recorded: 1987–1994
- Genre: CCM, pop
- Length: 61:06
- Label: Metro 1 Music
- Producer: Brian Ray

Crystal Lewis chronology
Recuerda (1992)	Crystal Lewis' Greatest Hits (1995)	Gold (1998)

Professional ratings
Review scores
Source	Rating
AllMusic	4.5/5 stars

Crystal Lewis' Greatest Hits is the second greatest hits album by Crystal Lewis, released in 1995.

== Track listing ==
1. "Come Just as You Are" (New song) — (4:26)
2. "Frustrated" (from Beyond the Charade) — (3:33)
3. "Precious Lord" (from Beyond the Charade) — (3:30)
4. "Bloodstained Pages" (from Joy) — (3:49)
5. "You Didn't Have to Do It" (from Joy) — (4:50)
6. "Let Love In" (from Let Love In) — (5:11)
7. "I Must Tell Jesus" (from Let Love In) — (5:02)
8. "Shine, Jesus, Shine" (from The Remix Collection) — (3:28)
9. "I Now Live" (from Remember) — (3:56)
10. "Remember" (from Remember) — (4:46)
11. "Only Fools" (from Remember) — (3:57)
12. "You'll Be Back for Me" (from The Bride) — (4:33)
13. "Amazing Grace" (from The Bride) — (4:40)
14. "My Redeemer Lives" (from The Bride) — (5:19)
