= Angel & Chanelle =

Studio album by Trin-i-tee 5:7
- Released: May 31, 2011
- Recorded: 2010–2011
- Genre: Gospel; R&B
- Length: 46:36
- Label: Music World Gospel
- Producer: Trin-i-tee 5:7 (also exec.); Mathew Knowles (exec.); Tito Ali; Ronny "Flip" Colson; Fred Jerkins III; Stan Jones; PJ Morton; David Mullen; Imani Pressley; Rockwilder; Andrew "Druski" Scott; Surefire Music Group

Trin-i-tee 5:7 chronology
Love, Peace, Joy at Christmas (2009)	Angel & Chanelle (2011)	Back Again (2018)

Trin-i-tee 5:7 studio album chronology
T57 (2007)	Angel & Chanelle (2011)

Singles from Angel & Chanelle
- 1. "Over and Over" Released: February 4, 2011; 2. "Heaven Hear My Heart" Released: May 28, 2011; 3. "Bring Your Praise" Released: October 22, 2011

Angel & Chanelle is the fifth studio album by American girl group Trin-i-tee 5:7. It was released on May 31, 2011 by Music World Gospel. Following a career hiatus that reignited their creativity, Trin-i-tee 5:7 was inspired to create a record musically and lyrically more personal than their previous albums. Their collaborations with songwriters and record producers Rockwilder, Ronny "Flip" Colson, and the Surefire Music Group produced a mellower tone, developing diverse vocal styles and influences from hip hop, pop, and soul music. Angel & Chanelle is also Trin-i-tee 5:7's first album as a music duo, following the departure of Adrian Anderson in October 2010.

By October 2011, the album had sold a total of 69,648 copies. In December 2011, Angel & Chanelle was ranked as the 13th Highest-Selling Gospel Album of 2011 by Billboard.

== Recording and production ==
Production of the album began in summer of 2010 with Trin-i-tee 5:7. Trin-i-tee 5:7 also took the role of executive producing alongside their manager, Mathew Knowles. They collaborated with several record producers and songwriters, including Imani Pressley, Surefire Music Group (production group composed of Jared Hancock, Brendan Brady, Stephen "Nef" Saxon, Sterling Brunsvold, and Brandon "OZ" Coleman), Maroon 5 member PJ Morton, Andrew "Druski" Scott, Tito Ali, Stan Jones, David Mullen, Rockwilder, as well as Rockwilder's protégé Ronny "Flip" Colson. The album also saw the return of frequent collaborator Fred Jerkins III, who co-produced the album's third single "Bring Your Praise". The duo also co-wrote or co-produced all material on Angel & Chanelle.

== Release and promotion ==
In February 2011, Trin-i-tee 5:7 began filming a mini-series titled "A New Day, A New Journey...On the road with Trin-i-tee 5:7", released on Music World Gospel's YouTube page. The mini-series consisted of fifteen episodes that followed Trin-i-tee 5:7 during their performances and recording of Angel & Chanelle. The duo also released a five-part video "Behind the scenes of Angel & Chanelle", with duo elaborating on the production of Angel & Chanelle. The video was also released on their website and later on Music World Gospel's YouTube page. On May 13, 2011, Trin-i-tee 5:7 appeared on 106 & Park to premiere the music video for their second single "Heaven Hear My Heart". On May 24, 2011, the duo performed "Over and Over" on Trinity Broadcasting Network's JCTV 1 Music Village Concert Special. On May 29, 2011, Lift Every Voice premiered the music video for "Over and Over".

The album was released worldwide on May 31, 2011. A deluxe edition of the album was also released simultaneously with the standard edition, which includes all of the previously released songs in addition to the new songs "The Cross", "I'm Still Holdin' On", "Psalm 139", "Drops of Rain", and "New Day". In the same month, they performed "Heaven Hear My Heart" on The Mo'Nique Show where they also sat down for an interview with Mo'Nique. In July 2011, Trin-i-tee 5:7 performed at annual Essence Music Festival.

To further promote the album, Trin-i-tee 5:7 embarked on a 25-city tour.

== Singles ==
The album's lead single, "Over and Over", which featured singer PJ Morton, was released exclusively to radio stations on February 4, 2011. Its high-mark debut at number 24 on the Billboard Hot Gospel Songs chart gave the album an early boost. The single peaked at number two on the chart for the week ending July 9, 2011, giving the group their second top ten single as well as their highest-charting song. After a total of thirty-nine weeks on the chart, "Over and Over" fell to the thirteenth position before retiring from the chart in late November 2011. On May 23, 2011, Trin-i-tee 5:7 released a music video for "Over and Over".

"Heaven Hear My Heart", released on May 28, 2011, debuted and peaked at the tenth position on the Billboard Gospel Digital Songs chart becoming the duo's second top ten single on that chart. "Heaven Hear My Heart" also peaked at number thirty-two on the Adult R&B Songs chart. The third and final single from Angel & Chanelle was "Bring Your Praise" released in the US on October 22, 2011. It peaked at number twenty-eight on the Hot Gospel Songs.

== Critical reception ==
Professional ratings
Review scores
Source	Rating
Christianity Today	3/5 stars
Cross Rhythms	10/10 squares
Rolling Out	(recommended)

Angel & Chanelle received moderately favorable reviews from music critics and media outlets. Andrew Greer of Christianity Today magazine gave the deluxe edition of the album a three-star rating, stating "Seventeen songs is long, but the invigorating duet keeps it fresh with their hip vocals." Arnell Pharr of Rolling Out media praised the lyrical content and wrote "What I appreciate most about this pair’s music is that they actually have lyrics — words that speak, that say something to the hearts and minds of people." The latter eventually gave the album a high recommendation.

Keren Perrott of Cross Rhythms favorable commented that the album "is a sure-fire hit with a plethora of radio-friendly tracks combining inspirational lyrics and soulful tunes."

== Accolades ==
Angel & Chanelle earned Trin-i-tee 5:7 their second Grammy nomination, where it was nominated for Best Gospel Album in 2012. The album also received a nomination in the category for Urban Album of the Year at the 2012 Dove Awards. At the 2011 Soul Train Music Awards "Heaven Hear My Heart" received an award nomination for Best Gospel Performance. Their album performance also earned two Stellar Award nominations, for "Group/Duo of the Year" and "Contemporary Group/Duo of the Year" in 2012.

== Commercial performance ==
In the United States, the album debuted at number 20 on the Billboard 200 for the week ending June 18, 2011, selling over 15,300 copies in the first week of its release. Angel & Chanelle became Trin-i-tee 5:7's highest debuting and charting album on Billboard Top 200 Albums chart, respectively. The following week, Angel & Chanelle fell to number 81 on Billboard 200, selling over 8,200 copies. Angel & Chanelle also debuted at number one on the Top Gospel Albums chart. By October 2011, the album had sold a total of 69,648 copies. In December 2011, Angel & Chanelle was ranked as the 13th Highest-Selling Gospel Album of 2011 by Billboard. The lead single "Over and Over" was also ranked at the 9th Highest-Selling Gospel Song of 2011. These achievements also made Trin-i-tee 5:7 the 10th Highest-Selling Gospel Artist of 2011.

== Track listing ==
Angel & Chanelle – Standard edition
No.	Title	Producer(s)	Length
1.	"Over and Over" (featuring PJ Morton)	Morton	4:07
2.	"Heaven Hear My Heart"	Surefire Music Group	3:11
3.	"God's Grace (Remix)"	Morton	4:23
4.	"I Need You Now"	Surefire Music Group	3:59
5.	"I Don't Need a Reason"	Surefire Music Group	3:31
6.	"Let It Go"	Surefire Music Group	3:39
7.	"Some Kind of Amazing"	Andrew "Druski" Scott	3:38
8.	"I Worship Your Name"	Stan Jones	5:00
9.	"I'm Still Holding On"	Jones	4:55
10.	"Bring Your Praise"	Fred Jerkins III; Imani Pressley	4:10
11.	"Blessing Me"	Rockwilder; Ronny "Flip" Colson	3:43
12.	"Just Remember"	Rockwilder; Colson	4:26
13.	"Listen (Count de Money Remix)"		7:27
Total length:			48:36

Angel & Chanelle – Deluxe edition
No.	Title	Producer(s)	Length
1.	"Heaven Hear My Heart"	Surefire Music Group	3:11
2.	"Let It Go"	Surefire Music Group	3:39
3.	"Some Kind of Amazing"	Andrew "Druski" Scott	3:38
4.	"Over and Over" (featuring PJ Morton)	Morton	4:07
5.	"God's Grace (Remix)"	Morton	4:23
6.	"I Don't Need a Reason"	Surefire Music Group	3:31
7.	"New Day"	Tito Ali	4:07
8.	"I Worship Your Name"	Stan Jones	5:00
9.	"The Cross"	Surefire Music Group	3:27
10.	"Bring Your Praise"	Fred Jerkins III; Imani Pressley	4:10
11.	"Just Remember"	Rockwilder; Colson	4:26
12.	"Blessing Me"	Rockwilder; Ronny "Flip" Colson	3:43
13.	"I Need You Now"	Surefire Music Group	3:59
14.	"I Am Not Alone"		3:52
15.	"I'm Still Holding On"	Jones	4:55
16.	"Psalm 139"	David Mullen	5:52
17.	"Drops of Rain"	Mullen	5:23
Total length:			71:17

== Personnel ==
Credits adapted from the liner notes of Angel & Chanelle.

- Chanelle Haynes – lead vocals, background vocals; A&R, executive producer, arrangement, audio production; vocal production
- Angel Taylor – lead vocals, background vocals; A&R, executive producer, arrangement, audio production; vocal production
- Mathew Knowles – A&R, executive producer
- Tito Ali – audio production
- Ronny "Flip" Colson – audio production
- Fred Jerkins III – audio production
- Stan Jones – audio production
- PJ Morton – lead vocals, audio production
- David Mullen – audio production
- Imani Pressley – audio production
- Rockwilder – audio production
- Andrew "Druski" Scott – audio production
- Surefire Music Group – audio production

== Charts ==
=== Weekly charts ===
Chart (2011)	Peak position
US Billboard 200	20
US Top Gospel Albums (Billboard)	1
US Top R&B/Hip-Hop Albums (Billboard)	2
US Independent Albums (Billboard)	5
US Indie Store Album Sales (Billboard)	15

=== Year-end charts ===
Chart (2011)	Position
US Top Gospel Albums (Billboard)	13
US Top R&B/Hip-Hop Albums (Billboard)	90
