= T57 (album) =

Studio album by Trin-i-tee 5:7
- Released: September 18, 2007 (standard); September 30, 2008 (deluxe)
- Genres: Urban Gospel, R&B, Hip hop soul
- Length: 45:37
- Label: Spirit Rising Music

Trin-i-tee 5:7 chronology
Holla: The Best of Trin-i-tee 5:7 (2007)	T57 (2007)	Angel & Chanelle (2011)

T57 is the fourth album of gospel group, Trin-i-tee 5:7. The album was released September 18, 2007, on Spirit Rising Music.

== Promotion ==
During 2007, the group embarked on their The Sisters in Spirit tour. The tour began in March 2007 and ended in August 2008. In September 2008, a deluxe edition of T57 which features three new songs was released. Following Hurricane Katrina, Trin-i-tee 5:7 formed the Trin-i-tee 5:7 Ambassador of Hope and Triumph Campaign. The group has taken the campaign to New Orleans, offering help to those affected by the hurricane. They have also visited Mississippi. In 2008, Trin-i-tee 5:7 took the campaign to Sacramento and Los Angeles, California, and Houston, Texas.

In January 2009, Trin-i-tee 5:7 performed at BET's Celebration of Gospel performing their single "Get Away". Since the release of T57, the group have been doing individual projects. Chanelle is pursuing an acting and solo career and has recorded her own songs like "I Still Love You". Adrian will be launching her own beauty line. Also, Adrian Anderson along with Soulfruit appeared on Spirit Rising's Pastor Rudy Experience album. Angel was hosting the BET network show 106 & Gospel, a spin-off of 106 & Park lasted for one season.

== Critical reception ==
Professional ratings
Review scores
Source	Rating
Cross Rhythms	9/10

Ian Martin from Cross Rhythms wrote that T57 was "definitely worth the wait." He found that the album "boasts production by some of the industry's finest, allowing for a sound comparable to the top R&B artists of today. However, their sound has a distinct power and soul, due not only to the quality of the music, but the extent to which each member has poured out their experience onto the record." AllMusic wrote: Trin-I-Tee 5:7 have always skillfully bridged the worlds of gospel and mainstream contemporary R&B by applying their slinky, TLC-like sound to messages of Christian faith. T57 is their most successful synthesis of the two genres to date. [It] has all the polish and glamour of most radio-tailored R&B." In her review of the deluxe edition of the album, SoulTracks editor Melody Charles noted: "The talent of Trin-i-tee 5:7 is always worthy, but the word "deluxe" implies much, much more than what this final product demonstrates."

== Awards ==
The album has won two Dove Awards. The group won an award for Urban Album of the Year and Urban Recorded Song of The Year for the song "Listen" at the 39th GMA Dove Awards. The group was also nominated for a Grammy Award. In 2008, T57 earned the group a nomination for BET Award featuring the category of Best Gospel Artist.

== Chart performance and sales ==
T57 debuted at number 102 on US Billboard 200. It also reached number two on Billboard's Top Gospel Albums, number five on the Top Christian Albums, and number 12 on the Top R&B/Hip-Hop Albums chart. In 2008, T57 became certified platinum selling over one million copies worldwide. The album spent over 73 weeks on the Top Gospel charts. "Listen" was released as the album's lead single and charted #1 on the gospel radio charts and #89 on Hot R&B charts. In early 2008, "I Will Lift" was released as the album's second single. "Get Away" was released as the lead single of the deluxe edition. "Get Away" charted at #3 on gospel radio charts. In December 2008, the cover song known as "Soul Is Anchored" was released as the album's fourth single.

== Track list ==
The deluxe version of T57 was released on September 30, 2008. The deluxe edition featured three new songs which also contained the album's third single "Get Away", which was produced by Rodney Jerkins. Along with iTunes, the music videos for "Listen", "I Will Lift", and "Get Away" were released as bonus tracks alongside the deluxe edition of T57. The album also featured a leftover track which leaked to internet entitled, "La-La".

=== Standard edition ===
1. "Listen"
2. "I Need You"
3. "I Will Lift"
4. "Reflection"
5. "Love"
6. "God's Triangle"
7. "Soul Is Anchored"
8. "I Still Love You"
9. "I Want to Go Back"
10. "U Saved Me"
11. "Like U"
12. "Beautiful Girl"

=== Deluxe edition ===
1. "Get Away"
2. "You're Holy"
3. "It Wasn't Me"
4. "Listen"
5. "I Need You"
6. "I Will Lift"
7. "Reflection"
8. "Love"
9. "God's Triangle"
10. "Soul Is Anchored"
11. "I Still Love You"
12. "I Want to Go Back"
13. "U Saved Me"
14. "Like U"
15. "Beautiful Girl"
16. "Listen" (Music video)
17. "I Will Lift" (Performance video)
18. "Behind the scenes"
19. "Get Away" (Music video) (iTunes bonus track)

== Charts ==
=== Weekly charts ===
Weekly chart performance for T57
Chart (2007)	Peak position
US Billboard 200	102
US Top Independent Albums (Billboard)	10
US Top Gospel Albums (Billboard)	2
US Top R&B/Hip-Hop Albums (Billboard)	12

=== Year-end charts ===
2007 year-end chart performance for T57
Chart (2007)	Position
US Top Gospel Albums (Billboard)	46

2008 year-end chart performance for T57
Chart (2008)	Position
US Top Gospel Albums (Billboard)	13

== Release history ==
T57 release history
Region	Date	Edition	Format	Label	Ref.
United States	September 18, 2007	Standard	CD; digital download	Spirit Rising Music	
United States	September 30, 2008	Deluxe	CD; digital download	Spirit Rising Music	
