= Trin-i-tee 5:7 (album) =

Studio album by Trin-i-tee 5:7
- Released: July 14, 1998
- Genres: Gospel, Christian R&B
- Length: 49:50
- Label: GospoCentric
- Producers: A-Tone; Percy Bady; Kevin Bond; Buster & Shavoni; R. Kelly; Stan Scates; Soulshock & Karlin

Trin-i-tee 5:7 chronology
Trin-i-tee 5:7 (1998)	Spiritual Love (1999)

Trin-i-tee 5:7 is the debut studio album by American gospel group Trin-i-tee 5:7. It was released by GospoCentric on July 14, 1998, in the United States. This was the first and only album to feature original member Terri Brown who would leave the following year. In 2011, Taylor and Hayes re-recorded the remix of "God's Grace" from their Angel & Chanelle album with the original versions to the song.

The album debuted at number 139 the US Billboard 200 and reached number one on the Top Gospel Albums, and number two on the Christian Albums. In 2000, it was certified Gold by the Recording Industry Association of America (RIAA). Trin-i-tee 5:7 spawned three singles, including "Oh! Mary Don't You Weep", "God's Grace", and "You Can Always Call His Name".

== Critical reception ==
Professional ratings
Review scores
Source	Rating
AllMusic	2.5/5 stars

AllMusic editor Stephen Thomas Erlewine rated the album two and a half out of five stars. He felt that Trin-i-tee was "an admirable attempt to bring the cool, new jack R&B stylings of TLC to contemporary gospel. Since the sound is so sexy, it's a little strange to hear it in a sacred setting, but the tracks that do work on Trin-I-Tee 5:7 prove that this was a risk worth taking."

== Track listing ==
Trin-i-tee 5:7 track listing
No.	Title	Producer(s)	Length
1.	"Intro: I Won't Turn Back"	A-Tone; Stan Scates	1:04
2.	"God's Grace"	R. Kelly	4:21
3.	"(You Can Always) Call His Name"	Buster & Shavoni	3:57
4.	"Oh! Mary Don't You Weep"	Kevin Bond	5:07
5.	"Saved Boy" (Interlude)	Bond	0:24
6.	"Pray for Awhile"	Buster & Shavoni	4:39
7.	"Good for Me"	Laythan Armor	4:15
8.	"God's Blessing"	Percy Bady	4:57
9.	"Sunshine"	A-Tone; Scates	4:21
10.	"With All My Heart"	Bady	3:56
11.	"Interlude: Pork Chop"	Bond	0:28
12.	"Respect Yourself"	Soulshock & Karlin	4:30
13.	"Holy & Righteous"	Bady	3:12
14.	"Call His Name" (The Remix)	Buster & Shavoni	4:04
15.	"Trin-i-tee" (The Interlude)	Bond	0:35
Total length:			49:50

== Charts ==
=== Weekly charts ===
Weekly chart performance for Trin-i-tee 5:7
Chart (1998)	Peak position
US Billboard 200	139
US Top Gospel Albums (Billboard)	1
US Top R&B/Hip-Hop Albums (Billboard)	20

=== Year-end charts ===
1998 year-end chart performance for Trin-i-tee 5:7
Chart (1998)	Position
US Top R&B/Hip-Hop Albums (Billboard)	95

1999 year-end chart performance for Trin-i-tee 5:7
Chart (1999)	Position
US Top R&B/Hip-Hop Albums (Billboard)	97

== Certifications ==
Certifications for Trin-i-tee 5:7
Region	Certification	Certified units/sales
United States (RIAA)	Gold	500,000^{^}
^{^} Shipments figures based on certification alone.
