= Paul Campion (radio host) =

Australian radio host (born 1969)

- Born: 10 November 1969 (age 56); Sarina, Queensland, Australia
- Presenting career
- Show: Campo Show; The Paul "Campo" Campion Drive Show
- Style: Drive-time show host
- Country: Australia

Paul Campion (born 10 November 1969 in Sarina, Queensland) is an Australian radio host and recipient of the Australian Commercial Radio Award for best music personality. In 2013 he was acknowledged at the Australian Commercial Radio Awards for 25 years of service to the industry. He is currently the breakfast presenter on River 94.9 in Ipswich.

== Career ==
Campion started his career in 1987 at 4MK in Mackay. His early years were spent learning his trade working at country and regional radio stations including 4VL, 4BU and 4GR before arriving at Sea FM on the Gold Coast in 1992.

In 1994 Campion joined 2Day FM in Sydney as an on-air presenter. With Austereo he had stints in Perth on the relaunch of Triple M in 1996 and as Drive presenter and on Drive time at B105 in Brisbane. At the time, he achieved the highest ratings figures in Austereo history.

In October 2001 he became the inaugural breakfast host of the new DMG / ARN 97.3 FM joint venture. He then became the drive presenter in 2004, a role he held until 2015, when he moved to River 94.9 in Ipswich, where he currently hosts and produces the Marnie and Campo breakfast program.

== Education ==
Campion received a graduate certificate in radio programming from the Australian Film, Television and Radio School in 2003. He has been a Queensland University of Technology mentor for media, communication and journalism students in Brisbane as well as studying as a Philosophy master's candidate.

== Personal life ==
Campion is married to Lea and has two children, Sam and Georgia. He is the older brother of former professional rugby league footballer Kevin Campion.
