= Crystal Lewis =

American singer (born 1969)

- Lewis in 2026

Background information
- Also known as: Crystal Lewis Ray
- Born: Crystal Lynn Lewis; September 11, 1969 (age 57); Corona, California, U.S.
- Occupation: Singer
- Instrument: Vocals
- Years active: 1986–present
- Labels: Frontline; Metro 1; Myrrh; Interscope
- Website: www.crystallewis.com

Crystal Lynn Lewis (born September 11, 1969) is an American contemporary Christian and jazz singer and songwriter. She has been nominated for several Grammy Awards and has won multiple GMA Dove Awards. Additionally, she has released numerous CCM chart-topping hits.

Lewis reached a commercial peak with her Billboard Top 5 albums: Let Love In (1990), Beauty for Ashes (1996), Gold (1998) and the Grammy-nominated Fearless (2000), which inspired young future superstars like Katy Perry and Tori Kelly.

== Early life and career ==
Crystal Lewis was born in Corona, California (where she grew up singing in her father's church). In 1984, at the age of 15, Lewis auditioned for a children's musical film called Hi-Tops. It was written and produced by Ernie and Debby Rettino, creators of Psalty, the Singing Song Book. She passed the audition, and was able to go into the studio to participate on the soundtrack recording, with the rest of the cast members.

While working on the musical, Lewis met a member of the rockabilly band The Lifters. After becoming friends with the band members, Lewis was asked to join. Soon after, the band changed its name to Wild Blue Yonder. Wild Blue Yonder was together for two years, and recorded a single full-length album, Wild Blue Yonder. It was produced by Daniel Amos front man Terry Scott Taylor, for Frontline Records in 1986. Lewis also sang on D.A.'s album Fearful Symmetry in 1986, and Taylor's solo album A Briefing for the Ascent in 1987.

After Wild Blue Yonder disbanded, Frontline offered Lewis a solo recording contract at the age of 17. Her first solo project, Beyond the Charade, was released in 1987. It featured the song "Breakdown", written by musician Jon Gibson. In 1988, Lewis sang a duet with Gibson called "Lost Inside of You", from his successful Change of Heart album (also released via Frontline Records).

In 1992, Lewis worked in the sketch comedy television series Roundhouse, which aired on Nickelodeon. In 1996, Lewis released her Myrrh Records debut, Beauty for Ashes. The album included three CCM chart-topping singles, including "People Get Ready (Jesus Is Comin')", which was honored with Song of the Year. Her next album, Gold, followed in 1998. Lewis was also featured on Kirk Franklin's hit song, "Lean on Me" in 1998. In 2000, Lewis returned with Fearless and the Christmas album, Holiday! A Collection of Christmas Classics. In 2015, her self-titled album Crystal Lewis was released, and the soulful jazz album Rhapsody followed in 2019.

In May 2022, Lewis released Together We Can, an album with guest artists and duets. The pop, soul and jazz record features Ty Herndon, Nikki Leonti, Kate Flannery, Tori Kelly, Ally Brooke, Lia Booth and others. She also sings with her adult children, Solomon and Isabella. "I Can't Help It" was the debut single released from the album.

== Personal life ==
Lewis previously lived in Montana with then-husband Brian Ray, with whom she has two children, who were homeschooled. Lewis and Ray divorced after 28 years of marriage, and she now lives in California.

Her daughter, Isabella (Izzi Ray), is also a singer and songwriter. Her son, Solomon, also pursued a career in music. He produced his mother's 2011 release, Plain and Simple.

== Discography ==
- 1986: Wild Blue Yonder
- 1987: Beyond the Charade
- 1989: Joy
- 1990: Let Love In
- 1992: Remember
- 1992: Recuerda
- 1993: The Bride
- 1993: La Esposa
- 1994: The Remix Collection
- 1995: Hymns My Life
- 1995: Himnos de Mi Vida
- 1996: Beauty for Ashes
- 1996: La Belleza de la Cruz
- 1998: Gold
- 1998: ORO
- 1999: Live @ the Woodlands
- 2000: Fearless
- 2000: La Coleccion
- 2000: Holiday!
- 2002: More Live
- 2002: Holy, Holy, Holy
- 2003: Santo, Santo, Santo
- 2005: SEE
- 2006: Joyful Noise
- 2010: Home for the Holidays
- 2011: Plain and Simple
- 2014: 25
- 2015: Crystal Lewis
- 2017: Suéltalo
- 2019: Rhapsody
- 2020: Just Because
- 2022: Together We Can
- 2024: A Seasonal Thing
- 2025: Claire Clementine Finds Her Voice

== Filmography ==
Film roles
Year	Title	Role	Notes
1985	Hi-Tops	Lily from the Valley	
2005	The 7th Commandment	Lil Regina	Short film
2010	The Wylds	The Gatekeeper	
2013	Treasure State	Joan Hogue	

Television roles
Year	Title	Role	Notes
1984	Colby's Clubhouse	N/A	Episode: "Crystal Is a Guest"
1992	Roundhouse	Various	13 episodes
2015	Praise the Lord	Herself / Performer	Episodes: "Episode April 1, 2015" & "Episode September 17, 2015"

== Awards and nominations ==
=== GMA Dove Awards ===
Year	Category	Nominated work	Result
1998	Female Vocalist of the Year		Won
1998	Spanish Language Album of the Year	La Belleza de la Cruz	Won
1999	Female Vocalist of the Year		Nominated
1999	Spanish Language Album of the Year	Oro (tied with Sandi Patty)	Won
1999	Special Event Album of the Year	Exodus (shared with dcTalk, Jars of Clay, Sixpence None the Richer, Cindy Morgan, Chris Rice, The Katinas, Third Day & Michael W. Smith)	Won
2017	Song of the Year	"Even If" (shared with Bart Millard, Ben Glover, David Garcia & Tim Timmons)	Nominated
2017	Pop/Contemporary Recorded Song of the Year	"Even If"	Nominated

=== Additional awards ===
Year	Association	Category	Work	Result
1993	Young Artist Awards	Outstanding Young Ensemble Cast in a Youth Series or Variety Show	Roundhouse (shared with cast)	Won
1999	Soul Train Music Awards	Best R&B/Soul Single – Male	"Lean on Me" (as featured artist)	Nominated
1999	Grammy Awards	Best R&B Performance by a Duo or Group with Vocals	"Lean on Me" (as featured artist)	Nominated
2001	Grammy Awards	Best Pop/Contemporary Gospel Album	Fearless	Nominated
