= GospoCentric Records =

American gospel music record label

- Parent company: Sony Music Entertainment
- Founded: 1993
- Founder: Vicki Mack Lataillade; Claude Lataillade
- Defunct: 2004 (Official); 2011 (Branding)
- Status: Defunct
- Distributor: RCA Inspiration
- Genre: Gospel
- Country of origin: United States
- Location: Inglewood, California
- Official website: gospocentric.com

GospoCentric Records was an Inglewood, California-based gospel music record label, started as an independent label by Vicki Mack Lataillade and Claude Lataillade in 1993. The label rose to prominence in the 1990s, largely on the runaway success of gospel artist Kirk Franklin. The label has grown to become one of the most prominent major gospel labels. GospoCentric later spawned the imprint B-Rite Music, which was used to launch artists like Trin-i-tee 5:7 and God's Property who found considerable mainstream success. GospoCentric was purchased by Zomba Music Group in the mid-2000s, which also owned the major gospel label Verity Records. GospoCentric has since been defunct, and the purchase now led to the record label RCA Inspiration which is owned by Sony Music Entertainment. The label gradually faded from album billing, between 2004 and 2011 on record releases, in which the label billing fading also coincided with the disbanding of Jive in 2011.

== List of artists ==
- Byron Cage
- Kurt Carr
- Dorinda Clark Cole
- Kirk Franklin
- Jon Gibson
- God's Property
- R. J. Helton
- Tramaine Hawkins
- Dave Hollister
- Bobby Jones
- Donald Lawrence
- Jackie McCullough
- Stephanie Mills
- J. Moss
- New Direction
- Kelly Price
- Woody Rock
- Papa San
- The Soul Seekers
- Trin-i-tee 5:7
- Natalie Wilson

== See also ==
- List of record labels
