= Live (Tramaine Hawkins album) =

Studio album by Tramaine Hawkins
- Released: 1990
- Recorded: May 6, 1990
- Studio: Alpha & Omega Recording Studio, San Francisco, California; Calvin Simmons Theater, Oakland, California; Fantasy Studios, Berkeley, California
- Genre: Gospel; R&B
- Length: 1:13:46
- Label: Sparrow
- Producer: Lee Magid; Tramaine Hawkins

Tramaine Hawkins chronology
The Joy That Floods My Soul (1988)	Live (1990)	To a Higher Place (1994)

Live is the debut live album by American gospel singer Tramaine Hawkins, released in 1990 on Sparrow Records. The album peaked at No. 2 on the US Billboard Top Gospel Albums and No. 25 on the US Billboard Top Contemporary Christian Albums chart.

== Reception ==
Professional ratings
Review scores
Source	Rating
AllMusic	4.5/5 stars

AllMusic's Bill Carpenter, in a 4.5/5-star review, called Live "Traditional Black gospel belting.'

Live was nominated for a Soul Train Award in the category of Best Gospel Album. Hawkins also won a Grammy for the album in the category of Best Traditional Soul Gospel Performance.

== Track listing ==
No.	Title	Writer(s)	Length
1.	"I Still Want You"	Timothy Carpenter	4:43
2.	"The Potter's House"	V. Michael McKay	6:35
3.	"Stand Still and Know"	Walter Hawkins	11:22
4.	"Cheer Up"	Jamie Hawkins	4:57
5.	"Who Is He?"	Rev. Calvin Bernard Rhone	6:02
6.	"Lift Me Up"	John Footman	7:42
7.	"Medley: Jesus Christ Is the Way/Dear Jesus, I Love You/He's That ..."	Walter Hawkins	24:57
8.	"Praise the Name of Jesus"	Rev. Calvin Bernard Rhone	7:28

== Personnel ==
- Alan Dockery – Photography
- Barbara Hearn – Art Direction
- Billy Ray Hearn – Executive Producer
- Carl Wheeler – Keyboards, Overdubs, String Overdubs
- Carlos Santana – Guitar
- Daryl Coley – Vocals
- Dave Plank – Assistant Engineer, Mixing Assistant
- Edwin Harper – Choir Coordinator, Choir Director, Coordination, Director
- Edwin Hawkins – Keyboards
- Eric Thomas – Clothing/Wardrobe, Costume Design
- Jamie Bridges – Mixing
- Jamie Hawkins – Keyboards
- Jerry Jordan – Bass
- Jimmy McGriff – Organ
- Joel Bryant – Organ
- Joel Smith – Drums
- John Faizarano – Engineer
- Jonathan DuBose, Jr. – Guitar
- Kevin Bond – Horn Overdubs, Overdubs
- Kevin Monroe – Vocals (Background)
- Laveria Jackson – Vocals (Background)
- Lee Hildebrand – Liner Notes
- Lee Magid – Concert Producer, Mastering, Producer
- Love Center Young Adult Choir – Choir/Chorus, Vocals
- Lucinda Simmons – Vocals (Background)
- Neill King – Mixing Assistant
- Oakland Interfaith Gospel Choir – Choir/Chorus, Vocals
- Ron Ray – Mixing Assistant
- Sherline Hall – Narrator
- Stanley Turrentine – Sax (Tenor)
- The Edwin Hawkins Singers – Vocals
- Tom Baker – Mastering
- Tramaine Hawkins – Producer, Vocals
- Walter Hawkins – Choir Director, Director, Keyboards, Producer
- Wendy McFadden – Design
- Willie Small – Vocals (Background)
