= Fall Down (Spirit of Love) =

Single by Tramaine Hawkins

from the album The Search Is Over
- Released: July 27, 1985
- Recorded: 1985
- Genre: Gospel
- Length: 4:12
- Label: A&M
- Songwriters: Vassal Gradington Benford, Robert Byron Wright
- Producer: Robert Byron Wright

Tramaine Hawkins singles chronology
"Fall Down (Spirit of Love)" (1985)	"Child of the King" (1986)

"Fall Down (Spirit of Love)" is a song by gospel singer Tramaine Hawkins, released in 1985 as a single on A&M Records. The song peaked at No. 1 on the US Billboard Dance Club Songs chart and number seven on the US Billboard Hot Soul Songs chart.

== Cover versions ==
In 2000, "Fall Down (Spirit of Love)" was remade by gospel singer Kelli Williams as "Fall Down 2000".
