= The Joy That Floods My Soul =

Studio album by Tramaine Hawkins
- Released: 1988
- Studio: Mad Hatter, Los Angeles, California; Paramount Recorders, Los Angeles, California
- Genre: Gospel; R&B
- Length: 44:40
- Label: Sparrow
- Producer: Lee Magid; Tramaine Hawkins

Tramaine Hawkins chronology
Freedom (1987)	The Joy That Floods My Soul (1988)	Live (1990)

The Joy That Floods My Soul is the fifth studio album by the American gospel singer Tramaine Hawkins, released in 1988 on Sparrow Records. The album peaked at No. 5 on the US Billboard Top Spiritual Albums chart.

== Reception ==
AllMusic's gave The Joy That Floods My Soul a 4.5/5-star rating.

Hawkins received a Grammy nomination in the category of Best Soul Gospel Performance, Female, for the album.

== Track listing ==
No.	Title	Writer(s)	Length
1.	"All Things Are Possible"	Oliver Jones	3:58
2.	"We're All in the Same Boat Together"	David Grover/Aaron Schroeder	4:53
3.	"Whenever You Call"	Rev. Calvin Bernard Rhone	5:09
4.	"Trusting in You"	Rev. Calvin Bernard Rhone	3:45
5.	"What Sall I Do"	Rev. Quincy Fielding, Jr.	5:54
6.	"I Got Joy"	Rev. Quincy Fielding, Jr.	3:55
7.	"With the Love of the Lord"	Rev. Calvin Bernard Rhone	4:30
8.	"Born of a Virgin"	Rev. Calvin Bernard Rhone	4:03
9.	"You Are My Life"	Angelo Badalamenti/ Artie Kaplan	4:15
10.	"He Loves Me"	Rev. Calvin Bernard Rhone	4:18

== Credits ==
- Alda Denise Mitchell - assistant arranger, Vocals
- Alltrinna Grayson - vocals
- Andrew Gouché - bass
- Barbara Catanzaro - art direction
- Barbara Murphy - vocals
- Belinda Cline - vocals
- Carl Cade - vocals
- Carolyn Johnson-White - vocals
- Charles Harris - vocals
- Charles Woods - vocals
- Cleo Kennedy - vocals
- Corey Briggs - vocals
- Cynthia Cannon - Vocals
- Cynthya Randall - arranger, vocals, background vocals
- Dana Hill - vocals
- Darryl Woolfolk - drums
- David Patterson - alto saxophone
- Durrell Harris - percussion
- Dwight Swiney - vocals
- Dytra Randall - arranger, vocals, background vocals
- Eric Wright - trumpet
- Evelyn J. Reason - vocals
- Fred Dinkins - drums
- Ira Rudnitz - engineer
- Jackie Gouché - vocals
- Jeffrey Richardson - vocals
- Jessica Smith - vocals
- Kecia Sanders - vocals
- Kenny Parker - vocals
- Kimmi Turner - vocals
- Koda McClain - vocals
- Kurt Carr - group, organ
- Lanthya Randall - arranger, vocals, background vocals
- Larry Ball - bass
- Larry Goetz - engineer
- Larry Mah - engineer
- LaShone Cleveland - vocals
- Lee Magid - producer
- Louis Van Taylor - bariton saxophone
- Mark Tucker - photography
- Messengers - choir/chorus
- Michael Neal - vocals
- Mike Daigeau - trombone
- Mike Schlessinger - engineer
- Nordyca Randall - arranger, vocals, background vocals
- Nysa Larry - vocals
- Otellia Allen - vocals
- Patricia Jackson - vocals
- Peter Nomura - design
- Phil Ranelin - trombone (bass)
- Randall - arranger, vocals, background vocals
- Randolph Addie - vocals
- Ray Fuller - guitar
- Regina Webb - vocals
- Rev. Calvin Bernard Rhone - arranger, assistant arranger, horn arrangements, keyboards, piano, string arrangements, vocals
- Rev. Quincy Fielding, Jr. - assistant arranger, horn arrangements, keyboards, piano
- Rickey Woodard - tenor saxophone
- Robin Turrentine - vocals
- Roger Spotts - horn arrangements
- Scott Mayo - alto saxophone
- Sheila Omorogieva - vocals
- Sherron Bennett - vocals
- Stevyn Glass - vocals
- The Randall Sisters & Brother - group, background vocals
- The Tramaingels - choir/chorus
- Theodore Randall II - vocals
- Tim Jaquette - engineer
- Tom Ralls - trombone
- Tommy Carter - trumpet
- Tonie Smith - vocals
- Tramaine Hawkins - arranger, choral adaptation, producer, string arrangements, vocals
- Truly Blessed - group
- Vanessa German - vocals
- Vivian Kirksey - vocals
