= List of awards and nominations received by Vickie Winans =

Vickie Winans awards and nominations
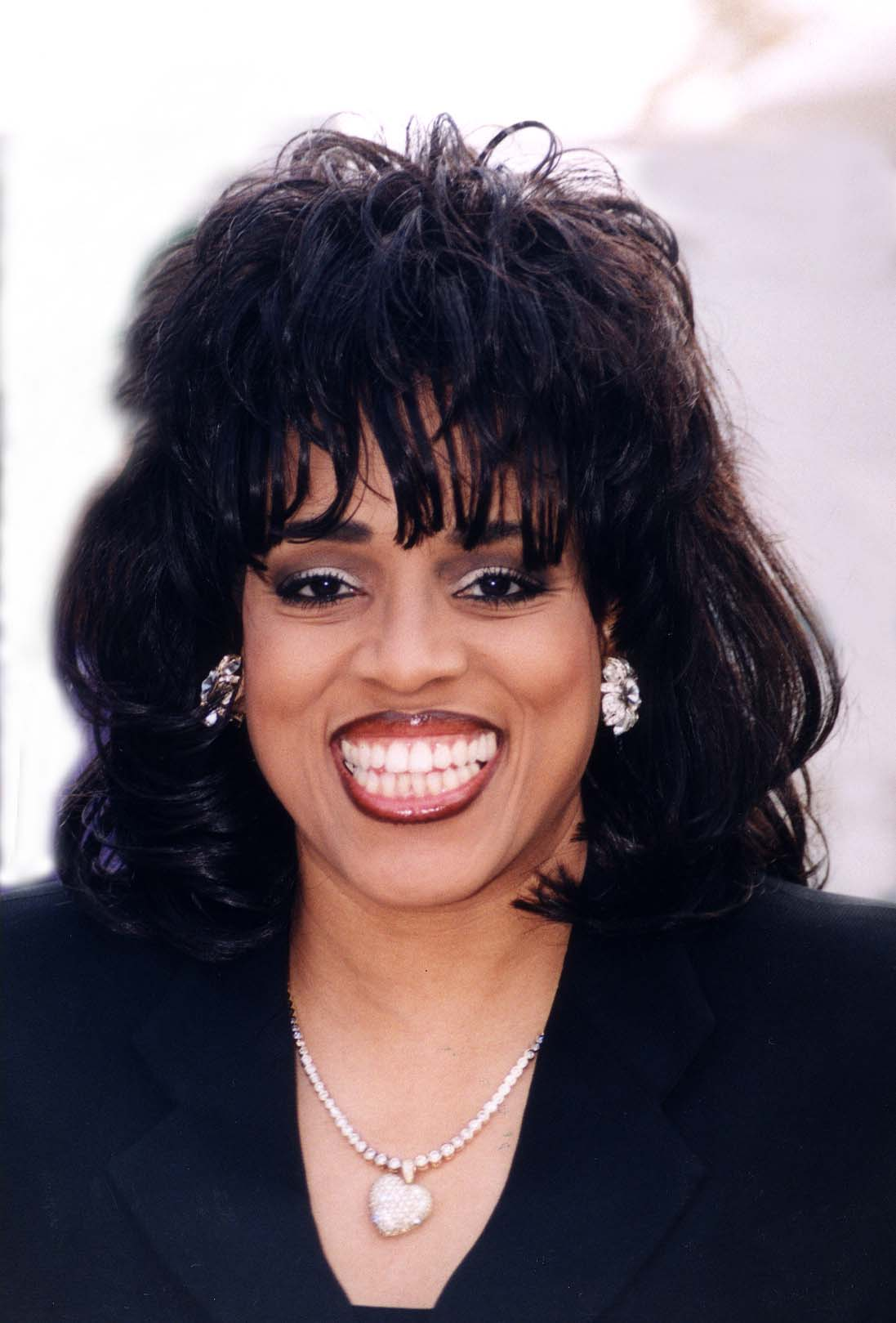
Awards and nominations
Award	Wins	Nominations
Grammy	0	7

Totals (Note: Certain award groups do not simply award one winner. They acknowledge several different recipients, have runners-up, and have third place. Since this is a specific recognition and is different from losing an award, runner-up mentions are considered wins in this award tally. For simplification and to avoid errors, each award in this list has been presumed to have had a prior nomination.)
- Wins: 8
- Nominations: 35

Vickie Winans is an American singer-songwriter and actress. She released her debut album Be Encouraged in 1985, which secured a Grammy Award nomination for Best Soul Gospel Performance, Female. Her breakthrough success with her second live album Live in Detroit II earned three Stellar Awards, and a Grammy Award nomination for Best Traditional Soul Gospel Album.

As of 2025, Vickie Winans has accumulated a total of eight competitive award wins and thirty-five nominations. She has also received a total of five honorary awards.

== Music ==
=== BET Awards ===
Award	Year	Category	Work	Result	Ref.
BET Awards	2004	Best Gospel Artist	—	Nominated	

=== GMA Dove Awards ===
Award	Year	Category	Work	Result	Ref.
GMA Dove Awards	1995	Contemporary Black Gospel Recorded Song	"Now We Shall Behold Him"	Nominated	
GMA Dove Awards	2000	Traditional Gospel Album	Live in Detroit II	Nominated	
GMA Dove Awards	2004	Contemporary Gospel Album	Bringing It All Together	Nominated	
GMA Dove Awards	2010	Best Traditional Gospel Album	How I Got Over	Nominated	

=== Grammy Awards ===
Award	Year	Category	Work	Result	Ref.
Grammy Awards	1988	Best Soul Gospel Performance, Female	Be Encouraged	Nominated	
Grammy Awards	1990	Best Soul Gospel Vocal Performance, Male, Female	Total Victory	Nominated	
Grammy Awards	1993	Best Contemporary Soul Gospel Album	The Lady	Nominated	
Grammy Awards	1998	Best Traditional Soul Gospel Album	Live in Detroit	Nominated	
Grammy Awards	2000	Best Traditional Soul Gospel Album	Live in Detroit II	Nominated	
Grammy Awards	2004	Best Contemporary Soul Gospel Album	Bringing It All Together	Nominated	
Grammy Awards	2010	Best Traditional Gospel Album	How I Got Over	Nominated	

=== Stellar Awards ===
Award	Year	Category	Work	Result	Ref.
Stellar Awards	2000	Artist of the Year	—	Nominated	
Stellar Awards	2000	Female Vocalist of the Year	—	Won	
Stellar Awards	2000	Producer of the Year	Live in Detroit II	Nominated	
Stellar Awards	2000	CD of the Year	Live in Detroit II	Nominated	
Stellar Awards	2000	Traditional Female Vocalist of the Year	Live in Detroit II	Won	
Stellar Awards	2000	Traditional CD of the Year	Live in Detroit II	Won	
Stellar Awards	2000	Music Video of the Year	Live in Detroit II	Nominated	
Stellar Awards	2004	Artist of the Year	—	Won	
Stellar Awards	2004	Song of the Year	"Shake Yourself Loose"	Nominated	
Stellar Awards	2004	Female Vocalist of the Year	—	Won	
Stellar Awards	2004	CD of the Year	Bringing It All Together	Nominated	
Stellar Awards	2004	Producer of the Year	Bringing It All Together	Nominated	
Stellar Awards	2004	Contemporary Female Vocalist of the Year	—	Nominated	
Stellar Awards	2004	Music Video of the Year	"Shook"	Won	
Stellar Awards	2004	Recorded Music Package of the Year	Bringing It All Together	Nominated	
Stellar Awards	2008	Female Vocalist of the Year	—	Nominated	
Stellar Awards	2008	CD of the Year	Woman to Woman: Songs of Life	Nominated	
Stellar Awards	2008	Contemporary Female of the Year	—	Nominated	
Stellar Awards	2008	Music Video of the Year	"The Rainbow"	Nominated	
Stellar Awards	2008	Recorded Music Package of the Year	Woman to Woman: Songs of Life	Nominated	
Stellar Awards	2009	Special Event CD of the Year	Happy Holidays	Nominated	
Stellar Awards	2009	Recorded Music Package of the Year	Happy Holidays	Nominated	
Stellar Awards	2010	Artist of the Year	—	Nominated	
Stellar Awards	2010	Song of the Year	"How I Got Over"	Nominated	
Stellar Awards	2010	Female Vocalist of the Year	—	Won	
Stellar Awards	2010	CD of the Year	How I Got Over	Nominated	
Stellar Awards	2010	Producer of the Year	How I Got Over	Nominated	
Stellar Awards	2010	Traditional Female of the Year	—	Nominated	
Stellar Awards	2010	Urban/Inspirational Single/Performance of the Year	"How I Got Over"	Nominated	
Stellar Awards	2010	Music Video of the Year	"How I Got Over"	Won	
Stellar Awards	2010	Recorded Music Package of the Year	How I Got Over	Nominated	
