= Tramaine (album) =

Studio album by Tramaine Hawkins
- Released: 1979
- Studio: Wally Heider Studios, San Francisco, California; Brass and Strings recorded at Martinsound, Alhambra, California
- Genre: Gospel, R&B
- Label: Light
- Producer: Walter Hawkins

Tramaine Hawkins chronology
Tramaine (1979)	Determined (1983)

Tramaine is the debut studio album by American gospel singer Tramaine Hawkins, released in 1979 by Light Records. The album was Grammy nominated in the category of Best Soul Gospel Performance, Contemporary.

== Track listing ==
All tracks are written by Walter Hawkins.

No.	Title	Length
1.	"Look at Me"	4:54
2.	"Lord I Try"	3:14
4.	"I'll Be with Him"	4:43
5.	"Holy One"	6:22
6.	"Call Me"	3:19
7.	"Highway"	5:14
8.	"When You Pray"	3:04
9.	"Will You Be There"	4:55
