= Still Tramaine =

Studio album by Tramaine Hawkins
- Released: 2001
- Studio: Coda Studios, Oakland, California; Dantny Studios; Sound Chambers REcorders, North Hollywood, California
- Genre: Gospel, R&B
- Length: 1:06:35
- Label: GospoCentric

Tramaine Hawkins chronology
To a Higher Place (1994)	Still Tramaine (2001)	I Never Lost My Praise: Live (2007)

Still Tramaine is the seventh studio album by American gospel singer Tramaine Hawkins, released in 2001 on GospoCentric Records. The album peaked at No. 5 on the US Billboard Top Gospel Albums chart.

== Reception ==
Professional ratings
Review scores
Source	Rating
AllMusic	3.5/5 stars

AllMusic's Tim A. Smith, in a 3.5/5 star review, wrote "This release is the first from landmark contemporary gospel artist Tramaine Hawkins since the mid-'90s. The long lapse of time between projects has done nothing to diminish Hawkins' power-packed, yet distinguished voice. Still Tramaine effectively infuses a nice mixture of traditional and contemporary gospel material".

The album was nominated for a Grammy in the category of Best Contemporary Soul Gospel Album.

== Track listing ==
No.	Title	Writer(s)	Length
1.	"Justified by Faith"	Rev. Calvin Bernard Rhone	5:39
2.	"Great Change"	Taneka Beard/Jason White	3:44
3.	"I'll See You Again"		7:03
4.	"I'm Stronger"	V. Michael McKay	6:05
5.	"It's Your Power"		5:20
6.	"All Is Not Lost"	Rev. Quincy Fielding, Jr.	6:15
7.	"On and On"		7:17
8.	"I'll Wear a Crown"		5:36
9.	"Simple Song"		6:17
10.	"Dedicated"	Bryant Pugh	2:29
11.	"Over There"		6:12
12.	"By His Strength"	Corey Williams	4:38

== Personnel ==
- Antoin Timmons - Vocals (Background)
- Bill Esses - Mixing
- Brenda Roy - Vocals (Background)
- Brian Sullivan - Instrumentation, Mixing, Remixing

Carl Wheeler - Engineer, Instrumentation

- Claude Lataillade - Executive Producer
- Daryl Williams - Vocals (Background)
- Herb Powers - Mastering
- Jamie Hawkins - Producer
- Jeremy Lubbock - Engineer, String Arrangements
- Joel Smith - Drums, Guitar (Bass)
- Jonathan DuBose, Jr. - Guitar
- Kevin Stancil - Guitar (Bass)
- Ladale Kemp - Vocals (Background)
- Mario Castellanos - Photography
- Monica Bacon - Executive Producer
- Patrick Sturgis - Instrumentation, Vocals (Background)
- Tramaine Hawkins - Executive Producer, Instrumentation, Vocals, Vocals (Background)
- Vicki Mack Lataillade - Executive Producer
- Walter Hawkins - Engineer, Producer
- Wendy Jones - Art Direction, Design
