= Special Gift =

Studio album by Walter Hawkins and the Family
- Released: 1988
- Studio: Fantasy Studios Starlight Studios Take One Studios, Burbank
- Genre: Gospel
- Length: 53:57
- Label: Birthright Records
- Producer: Walter Hawkins

Special Gift is a studio album by gospel artist Walter Hawkins and the Family released in 1988 by Birthright Records. The album was produced by Hawkins. The album reached No. 17 on the Billboard Top Gospel Albums chart.

Hawkings was nominated for a Grammy Award for Best Soul Gospel Performance, Male for his performance on the title track.

== Critical reception ==
Professional ratings
Review scores
Source	Rating
AllMusic	2.5/5 stars

AllMusic gave the album a 2.5 out of 5 star rating.

== Track listing ==
No.	Title	Writer(s)	Length
1.	"Had It Not Been For Him"	Walter Hawkins	4:03
2.	"He's Just That Way"	Walter Hawkins	5:01
3.	"Special Gift"	Walter Hawkins	3:38
4.	"Guide My Way"	Kevin Bond, Margaret Poindexter	5:19
5.	"Only Jesus"	Kevin Bond, Margaret Poindexter, Walter Hawkins	4:24
6.	"I'll See The Son"	Walter Hawkins	5:45
7.	"He Does All Things Well"	Walter Hawkins	5:05
8.	"I Will Give All"	Johnathan DuBose	4:25
9.	"Love Is The Only Way"	Edwin Hakwins	6:04
