= The Search Is Over (Tramaine Hawkins album) =

Studio album by Tramaine Hawkins
- Released: 1986
- Studio: Fantasy Studios, Berkeley, California; Media Sound, Copenhagen, Denmark
- Genre: Gospel; R&B
- Length: 43:47
- Label: A&M
- Producer: Loris Holland; Robert Wright; Vassal Benford

Tramaine Hawkins chronology
Determined (1983)	The Search Is Over (1986)	Freedom (1987)

The Search Is Over is the third studio album by the American gospel singer Tramaine Hawkins, released in 1986 on A&M Records. The album peaked at No. 2 on the US Billboard Top Spiritual LPs chart and No. 33 on the US Billboard Top Black Albums chart.

== Reception ==
Professional ratings
Review scores
Source	Rating
AllMusic	4.5/5 stars

AllMusic's Ron Wynn, in a 4.5/5-star review, commented "Although Tramaine insisted that she never deserted the church, it was hard to tell the difference between most of this album's songs and standard secular urban contemporary material."

Hawkins received a Grammy nomination in the category of Best Soul Gospel Performance, Female, for the album.

== Track listing ==
No.	Title	Writer(s)	Length
1.	"Heaven's Gate (Interlude)"	Loris Holland, Robert Wright	1:38
2.	"Fall Down"	Robert Wright, Vassal Benford	4:34
3.	"Child Of The King"	Fonzi Thornton, Robert Wright	5:25
4.	"In The Morning Time"	Robert Wright	5:18
5.	"With All My Heart"	Robert Wright	4:38
6.	"How I Got Over"		5:35
7.	"The Search Is Over"	Edwin Hawkins	5:12
8.	"Everybody Ought To Know"	Robert Wright, Tramaine Hawkins, Walter Hawkins	6:01
9.	"I Know Him"	Edwin Hawkins	5:01

== Personnel ==
- Alan Rubin - trumpet
- Andy Cardenas - Assistant Engineer
- Bashiri Johnson - Drum Programming, Percussion
- Benny Diggs - Choir/Chorus
- Brenda Roy - Vocals (Background)
- Bruce Smith - Assistant Engineer
- Buddy Williams - drums
- Carol Coleman - Production Assistant
- Chuck Beeson - Art Direction
- Doc Powell - guitar
- Edwin Hawkins - Vocals (Background)
- Eric Gale - guitar
- Fonzi Thornton - Choir/Chorus, Composer, Drum Programming, Vocal Contractor, Vocals (Background)
- Francisco Centeno - Bass
- Frank Doyle - Programming, Synthesizer
- Frank Wess - saxophone
- George Marino - Mastering
- Jack Waldman - keyboards, synthesizer
- James Pugh - trombone
- Jeff Gold - Art Direction
- Jimmy Blondolillo - Rhythm Arrangements
- Jimmy Maelen - percussion
- Joel Smith - bass, drums
- Jonathan DuBose, Jr. - guitar
- Larry Williams - photography
- Lawrence Feldman - saxophone
- Loris Holland - Drum Programming, Keyboards, Orchestration, Producer
- Luci Martin - Choir/Chorus
- Mark Kovach - Programming, Synthesizer
- Marshall Titus - Vocals (Background)
- Marvin Stamm - trumpet
- Michael "Dino" Campbell - guitar
- Michael Brecker - saxophone
- Michael D. Hektoen - Executive Producer
- Michelle Cobbs - Choir/Chorus, Vocals (Background)
- Nat Adderley - Horn Arrangements, Keyboards, Rhythm Arrangements, Synthesizer
- Phillip Ballou - Choir/Chorus, Vocals (Background)
- Raul Rekow - percussion
- Rev. Yvette Flunder - Vocals (Background)
- Robert Wright - Producer, Drum Programming, Keyboards, Orchestration, Vocal Arrangement
- Ronnie Cuber - saxophone
- Sammy Merendino - drums
- Shirley Miller - vocals (Background)
- Skip Anderson - bass, synthesizer
- Steve Love - guitar
- T.M. Stevens - bass
- Tawatha Agee - Choir/Chorus, Vocals (Background)
- Tom Roberts - Engineer, Mixing, Special Effects
- Tramaine Hawkins - vocals
- Vassal Benford - Drum Programming, Keyboards, Producer, Synthesizer
- Walter Hawkins - piano, background
- Walter Levinsky - saxophone
- Wayne Andre - trombone
