= Determined (album) =

Studio album by Tramaine Hawkins
- Released: 1983
- Studio: Different Fur Recording Studio, San Francisco, California; Front Page Recording Studio, Irvine, California
- Genre: Gospel, R&B
- Label: Light Records
- Producer: Walter Hawkins

Tramaine Hawkins chronology
Tramaine (1979)	Determined (1983)	The Search Is Over (1986)

Determined is the second studio album by American gospel singer Tramaine Hawkins, released in 1983 on Light Records. The album peaked at No. 6 on the US Billboard Top Spiritual LPs chart.

== Accolades ==
Hawkins earned a Grammy nomination in the category of Best Soul Gospel Performance, Female, for the album.

== Track listing ==
All tracks are written by Walter Hawkins.

No.	Title	Length
1.	"Waymaker"	4:21
2.	"Greatest Lover"	4:42
3.	"Giving and Living"	3:36
4.	"Rescue Me"	4:48
5.	"Can´t Find the Words"	3:08
6.	"Trust and Obey"	1:07
7.	"Set Me Free"	5:32
8.	"I Am Determined"	3:52
9.	"I Need You"	3:37
10.	"Hear My Word"	2:21
