= I Never Lost My Praise: Live =

Live album by Tramaine Hawkins
- Released: March 6, 2007
- Recorded: February 18, 2006
- Studios: AEclectic Studio, Nashville, Tennessee; Reid Temple African Methodist Episcopal Church, Glen Dale, Maryland; Studio in the Heights, Houston, Texas; the Bennett House, Nashville, Tennessee
- Genres: Gospel, R&B
- Length: 1:09:39
- Label: GospoCentric

Tramaine Hawkins chronology
Still Tramaine (2001)	I Never Lost My Praise: Live (2007)

I Never Lost My Praise: Live is the second live album by American gospel singer Tramaine Hawkins, released in 2007 on GospoCentric Records. The album peaked at No. 12 on the US Billboard Top Gospel Albums chart.

== Track listing ==
No.	Title	Writer(s)	Length
1.	"Excellent Lord/Introduction" (featuring Kurt Carr)		4:15
2.	"Excellent Lord" (Reprise)		1:22
3.	"You Get the Glory"	Kurt Carr	7:01
4.	"I Never Lost My Praise" (featuring Patrick Lundy)	Kurt Carr	8:36
5.	"Come Holy Spirit/Worship You"		8:08
6.	"Worship Medley: Praise the Name of Jesus/There Is None Like You/There's"	Lenny LeBlanc	11:05
7.	"I Need You"		6:10
8.	"Oh Happy Day"	Traditional	6:07
9.	"Lord You Are" (featuring Richard Smallwood)		5:17
10.	"Like Never Before" (featuring Patrick Lundy)	Kurt Carr	6:13
11.	"Don't Count Me Out"	Kurt Carr	5:25

== Credits ==
- Barry Green - trombone
- Carl Gorodetzky - concert master
- Carolyn White - vocals
- Charles Harris - technical director
- Chaz Harper - mastering
- Chris Yoakum - mixing assistant
- Claude Lataillade - executive producer
- Daniel Austin - vocals
- Darlene Simmons - vocals
- Doug Moffet - baritone sax, tenor sax
- Edwin Hawkins - adaptation
- Greg Hartman - live recording
- Herb Powers - mastering
- Jeff Gilligan - art direction, design
- Jerome Bell - management, production coordination
- Joel Bryant - organ
- John Jaszcz - mixing, tracking
- Jonathan DuBose, Jr. - guitar
- Kurt Carr - producer
- L. Grant Greene - assistant tracking engineer
- Lloyd Barry - horn arrangements, string arrangements
- Michael McElroy - vocals
- Nathaniel Townsley - drums
- Nick Sparks - horn engineer, string engineer
- Patrick Lundy
- Richard Smallwood
- Steve Patrick - trumpet
- Sunny Hawkins - vocal producer
- Terry Baker - drum overdubs
- The Nashville String Machine - strings
- Timiney Figueroa-Caton - vocals
- Tramaine Hawkins - Executive Producer
- Troy Bright - vocals
- Vicki Mack Lataillade - executive producer, production coordination
- Vinnie Ciesielski - trumpet
- Yvette Williams - vocals
