= Determined =

Determined may refer to:

- Determined (album), 1983 album by Tremaine Hawkins
- "Determined" (song), 2005 song by Mudvayne
- Determined: A Science of Life Without Free Will, 2023 book by Robert Sapolsky

== See also ==
- Determinacy, a subfield of game theory and set theory
