= Love Alive III =

Studio album by Walter Hawkins
- Released: 1984
- Genre: Gospel
- Length: 53:57
- Label: Light
- Producer: Walter Hawkins

Love Alive III is a studio album by gospel artist Walter Hawkins released in 1984 by Light Records. The album reached No. 1 on the Billboard Top Gospel Albums chart and went on to sell over 1 million copies, making it one of the best-selling gospel albums of all time.

== Overview ==
Love Alive III was produced by Walter Hawkins. Artists such as Daryl Coley and Rev. Yvette Flunder appear on the album.

== Critical reception ==
Professional ratings
Review scores
Source	Rating
AllMusic	3/5 stars

AllMusic gave the album a 3 out of 5 star rating.

== Track listing ==
Love Alive III track listing
No.	Title	Writer(s)	Length
1.	"Wait on the Lord"	Walter Hawkins	4:36
2.	"Jesus is My Friend"	Walter Hawkins	5:20
3.	"When the Battle is Over"	Walter Hawkins, Jessie Hill, Mac Rebennack	4:47
4.	"Return, O Backslider"		6:44
5.	"He'll Bring You Out"	Walter Hawkins	4:24
6.	"He Is Lord"	Walter Hawkins	6:25
7.	"I Love You, Lord"	Edwin Hawkins, Walter Hawkins	8:07
8.	"There's a War Going On"	Walter Hakwins	5:55
9.	"Is There Any Way?"	Walter Hakwins	4:50
