= To a Higher Place =

Studio album by Tramaine Hawkins
- Released: 1994
- Recorded: December 6, 1993 – December 15, 1994
- Studio: Interface Recording Studios, New York, New York; Ocean Way Recording Studios, Hollywood, California; Record One Studios
- Genre: Gospel; R&B
- Length: 49:06
- Label: Columbia
- Producer: Lee Magid; Tramaine Hawkins

Tramaine Hawkins chronology
| Live (1990) | To a Higher Place (1994) | Still Tramaine (2001) |

To a Higher Place is the sixth studio album by American gospel singer Tramaine Hawkins, released in 1994 on Columbia Records. The album peaked at No. 4 on the US Billboard Top Gospel Albums chart.

== Reception ==
Professional ratings
Review scores
| Source | Rating |
|---|---|
| AllMusic | 3.5/5 stars |

AllMusic gave To a Higher Place a 3/5-star rating.

The album was nominatedGrammy Award in the category of Best Contemporary Soul Gospel Album.

== Track listing ==
| No. | Title | Writer(s) | Length |
|---|---|---|---|
| 1. | "Amazing Grace" | John Newton | 7:08 |
| 2. | "Who's Gonna Carry You" | Eve Nelson/Diane Scanlon | 5:18 |
| 3. | "That's Why I Love You Like I Do" | Alex Brown/Rev. Patrick Henderson | 4:59 |
| 4. | "Trees" | Joyce Kilmer/Oscar Rasbach | 3:56 |
| 5. | "I Found the Answer" (featuring Mahalia Jackson) | John Lange | 4:11 |
| 6. | "Touch Me" | Alex Brown/ Rev. Patrick Henderson | 4:31 |
| 7. | "Stand Your Ground" | Benny Diggs/Tramaine Hawkins/Joseph Jobert | 4:20 |
| 8. | "Aim Your Arrow High" | George Lyter/Michael OHara/Denise Rich | 4:52 |
| 9. | "I Don't Wanna Be Misunderstood" | Michael OHara/Denise Rich/Mary Unobsky | 4:01 |
| 10. | "It's Never Too Late" | David Grover/Aaron Schroeder | 5:50 |

== Personnel ==
- Abraham Laboriel, Sr. - Bass
- Addison Farmer - Bass
- Alex Brown - Vocals (Background)
- Allen Sides - Editing, Engineer, Mixing
- Benny Diggs - Arranger, Producer
- Bernie Grundman - Mastering
- Carmen Carter - Vocals (Background)
- Dave Darlington - Engineer
- Dave Reitzas - Engineer, Mixing
- David Paich - Keyboards, Producer
- Dr. George Butler - Executive Producer
- Eve Nelson - Keyboards, Producer, Programming, Vocals (Background)
- Greg Phillinganes - Bass, Keyboards, Piano
- Harvey Mason, Sr. - Drums
- Ivan Hampden - Drums
- Jeremy Lubbock - Arranger, Conductor, Producer
- Jerry Peter - Piano, Synthesizer
- Jimmy Raney - Guitar
- Joe Laquidera - Engineer
- Jonathan Grier - Director
- Joseph Jobert - Arranger, Multi Instruments, Producer
- Julie Delgado - Vocals (Background)
- Katreese Barnes - Vocals (Background)
- Larry Bunker - Percussion, Vocals (Background)
- Larry Fuller - Bass
- Leon "Ndugu" Chancler - Drums
- Mahalia Jackson - Vocals
- Marcia Sapp - Vocals (Background)
- Mark Schaffel - Engineer
- Marlena Jeter - Vocals (Background)
- Marty Paich - Arranger, Conductor, Producer
- Michelle Weeks - Vocals (Background)
- Mildred Falls - Piano
- Nancy Jackson - Vocals (Background)
- Noel Hazen - Engineer
- Ossie Davis - Guest Artist
- Paul Jackson, Jr. - Guitar
- Paulinho Da Costa - Percussion
- Phillip Ballou - Vocals (Background)
- Randy Kerber - Piano
- Ray Fuller - Guitar
- Richard Evans - Arranger, Conductor
- Sherry McGhee - Vocals (Background)
- Stephen Walker - Art Direction
- Tata Vega - Vocals (Background)
- Tony Warren - Vocals (Background)
- Tramaine Hawkins - Arranger, Vocals, Vocals (Background)
