= Love Alive II =

Studio album by Walter Hawkins and the Love Center Choir
- Released: 1978
- Studio: Ephesian Church, Berkeley, CA
- Genre: Gospel
- Length: 47:24
- Label: Light
- Producer: Walter Hawkins

Professional ratings
Review scores
Source	Rating
AllMusic	3/5 stars

Love Alive II is a studio album by gospel artist Walter Hawkins and the Love Center Choir. It was released in 1978 by Light Records. Hawkins and the album earned a Grammy nomination in the category of Best Soul Gospel Performance, Contemporary.

== Overview ==
Love Alive II was produced by Walter Hawkins. Tramaine Hawkins appears on the album.

== Track listing ==
All tracks are written by Walter Hawkins.

Love Alive II track listing
No.	Title	Length
1.	"Come By Here, Good Lord"	3:27
2.	"He's That Kind of Friend"	7:36
3.	"Never Alone"	6:30
4.	"Until I Found the Lord"	7:10
5.	"Be Grateful"	6:56
6.	"I'm Goin' Away"	8:34
7.	"God Will Open Doors"	4:13
8.	"Right On"	2:58
