= Love Alive IV =

Studio album by Walter Hawkins
- Released: 1990
- Studio: Love Center Church, Oakland
- Genre: Gospel
- Length: 1:05:56
- Label: Malaco Records
- Producer: Walter Hawkins

Love Alive IV is a studio album by gospel artist Walter Hawkins and the Family released in 1990 on Malaco Records. It was produced by Hawkins. The album spent ten weeks at No. 1 on the Billboard Top Gospel Albums chart and reached No. 29 on the Billboard Top Christian Albums chart.

Love Alive IV earned a Grammy nomination in the category of Best Gospel Album By A Choir Or Chorus.

== Critical reception ==
Professional ratings
Review scores
Source	Rating
AllMusic	3/5 stars

AllMusic gave the album a 3 out of 5 star rating.

== Track listing ==
No.	Title	Writer(s)	Length
1.	"Intro (God Will Take Care of You)"	Traditional	1:30
2.	"Jesus Is Waiting" (featuring Leonard Conner)	Walter Hawkins	4:47
3.	"Solid Rock" (featuring S. Hall, Terri McFarland, Eric Smith)	Patrisha Gill / Traditional	4:45
4.	"I Can Bear It"	Edwin Hawkins	5:05
5.	"He Knows" (featuring Walter Redmond)	Edwin Hawkins	5:36
6.	"Full and Complete" (featuring Rev. Yvette Flunder, Shirley Miller)	Walter Hawkins	11:23
7.	"Oh My Jesus" (featuring Edwin Hawkins, LaVerne Moore)	Walter Hawkins	5:09
8.	"Who Shall Separate Us" (featuring Lawanda Scroggins)		5:34
9.	"Come to Jesus" (featuring Brenda Roy)	Michael Brooks, Walter Hawkins	5:02
10.	"The Just Shall Live" (featuring Carole King)	Michael Brooks, Walter Hawkins	5:02
11.	"Thank You" (featuring Rev. Yvette Flunder)	Walter Hawkins	10:42
