= The Hawkins Family =

Studio album by Walter Hawkins
- Released: 1980
- Genre: Gospel
- Length: 50:32
- Label: Light Records
- Producer: Walter Hawkins

The Hawkins Family is a live album by Walter Hawkins released in 1980 on Light Records. The album was Grammy nominated in the category of Best Soul Gospel Performance, Contemporary.

== Track listing ==
No.	Title	Length
1.	"Goin' to a Place"	4:50
2.	"Love Is God"	5:39
3.	"What Is This"	6:08
4.	"I'm a Pilgrim"	8:32
5.	"He'll Be There (When You Need Him)"	4:41
6.	"Eternal Life"	6:46
7.	"Keep On Fighting"	5:33
8.	"Try Christ"	8:07
