= Sam Fletcher (singer) =

American singer (1934–1989)

- Born: Ira Levi Fletcher; January 15, 1934; Tennessee, U.S.
- Died: April 25, 1989 (aged 55) Los Angeles, California, U.S.
- Genres: Soul, pop
- Occupation: Singer
- Instrument: Vocals
- Years active: 1950s–1980s
- Labels: Metro, Cub, RCA Victor, Tollie, Vee-Jay

Sam Fletcher (born Ira Levi Fletcher, January 15, 1934 – April 25, 1989) (Note: Some sources give a birth year of 1933 and a death year of 1984, but these are in conflict with his headstone and family records.) was an American singer who recorded in the late 1950s and 1960s.

== Life and career ==
Fletcher was born in rural Tennessee and grew up in Memphis. His family were members of the Church of God in Christ (COGIC), and as a child he would attract church audiences for his singing. After studying at college, he joined the US Army, served during the Korean War, and while stationed in Germany sang with the Seventh Army Jazz Concert Band. On returning to the US he began performing popular secular music despite the opposition of his family and church. From 1958, he released several singles on the Metro and Cub labels, both subsidiaries of MGM Records. He performed in jazz and supper clubs in New York City, and appeared in an Off-Broadway production of The Amen Corner. Manager Lee Magid signed him to RCA Victor Records in 1960, and he released further singles, produced by Hugo Peretti and Luigi Creatore, including "Tall Hope" (from the musical Wildcat), and his signature song, "I Believe In You" in 1961. While regionally successful, none of his records made the national charts.

Singer Dinah Shore sought out Fletcher to appear in her television shows. He appeared in her The Best is Yet To Come end-of-season special in 1963, and later on American Bandstand and other television variety shows. After moving to Los Angeles, he became a popular nightclub and cabaret act, and opened for such stars as Phyllis Diller and Mitzi Gaynor. As "The Man With The Golden Voice", he signed for Vee-Jay Records, who released his first album, Sam Fletcher Sings 'I Believe in You' – featuring a re-recording of his earlier song, and arrangements by Bill Finegan – in 1964. Fletcher's single, "I'd Think It Over", produced by Calvin Carter and released on Vee-Jay's subsidiary Tollie label in 1964, was later popular on Britain's Northern soul scene.

Continuing to appear on shows presented by both Dinah Shore and Della Reese, Fletcher recorded his second album, The Look of Love – The Sound of Soul, a collection of jazz standards and other songs including "God Only Knows", arranged by Harry Betts, for Vault Records in 1967. Fletcher's career was derailed and effectively ended by his arrest in Los Angeles on narcotics charges in December 1967. He went into rehabilitation and attempted to revive his career but was restricted to local performances and occasional more public events such as Muhammad Ali's wedding to Veronica Porche in 1977. He also worked as a teacher in Los Angeles. He was injured in a street robbery in the early 1980s, and performers at a benefit event for him included O. C. Smith and his friend Esther Phillips.

He died in Los Angeles in 1989 (not 1984 as sometimes reported), and was buried with military honors at Memphis National Cemetery.

A CD containing both his albums has been released by Fresh Sound Records.

== Albums ==
- Sam Fletcher Sings "I Believe In You" (Vee-Jay, 1964)
- The Look of Love – The Sound of Soul (Vault, 1967)
