= New Dawning =

Studio album by Walter Hawkins and the Hawkins Family
- Released: 1995
- Studio: Calvin Simmons Theater, Oakland, CA
- Genre: Gospel
- Length: 1:13:48
- Label: Bellmark Records
- Producer: Walter Hawkins

New Dawning is a studio album by gospel artist Walter Hawkins and the Hawkins Family released in 1995 by Bellmark Records and produced by Hawkins. The album reached No. 3 on the Billboard Top Gospel Albums chart.

The album was Grammy nominated in the category of Best Traditional Soul Gospel Album.

== Critical reception ==
Professional ratings
Review scores
Source	Rating
AllMusic	3/5 stars

AllMusic gave New Dawning a 3 out of 5 star rating.

== Tracklisting ==
No.	Title	Writer(s)	Length
1.	"There's One"	Kenneth Keith DuBose	4:44
2.	"So We Learn"	Walter Hawkins	6:52
3.	"Take Courage"	Edwin Hawkins	7:51
4.	"Lord You Said It"	Walter Hawkins, Carl Wheeler	5:01
5.	"Come Live With Me"	Walter Hawkins	6:02
6.	"Keeps Making a Way"	Walter Hawkins	4:34
7.	"Daylight's Breaking"	Walter Hawkins	6:56
8.	"My Praise"	Kevin Bond	7:13
9.	"I Love You, Lord"	Edwin Hawkins, Walter Hawkins	9:30
10.	"He Does All Things Well"	Walter Hawkins	5:25
11.	"In the Midst of It All"	Kevin Bond	7:23
12.	"Peace Be With Thee"	Kevin Bond	2:17
