= Deleon Richards =

American gospel singer

Deleon Richards (born September 18, 1976) is an American gospel singer. In the 28th Annual Grammy Awards, she was nominated for Best Soul Gospel Performance - Female.

Richards reportedly had a long relationship with singer R. Kelly in the 1990s. She subsequently married baseball player Gary Sheffield.

== Discography ==
- DeLeon (Myrrh, 1984)
- Don't Follow the Crowd (Rejoice, 1987)
- We Need to Hear from You (Word, 1989)
- New Direction (Word, 1992)
- My Life (Intersound, 1996)
- Straight from the Heart (Tommy Boy Gospel, 2001)
- Here in Me (DeMari/Arrow, 2008)
