= Grammy Award for Best Soul Gospel Performance, Male or Female =

Annual music award

- Awarded for: Quality soul gospel performances
- Country: United States
- Presented by: National Academy of Recording Arts and Sciences
- First award: 1990
- Final award: 1990
- Website: grammy.com

The Grammy Award for Best Soul Gospel Performance, Male or Female was an award presented at the 32nd Annual Grammy Awards in 1990 for quality soul gospel performances. The Grammy Awards, an annual ceremony that was established in 1958, and originally called the Gramophone Awards, are presented by the National Academy of Recording Arts and Sciences of the United States to: "honor artistic achievement, technical proficiency and overall excellence in the recording industry, without regard to album sales or chart position".

Prior to the Grammy Award for Best Soul Gospel Performance, Male or Female, there were two categories separated by gender (Best Soul Gospel Performance, Female and Best Soul Gospel Performance, Male), both of which were first presented in 1984. The first gender-neutral award was presented to Al Green in 1990 for his performance of "As Long as We're Together". In 1991, another category restructure resulted in the soul gospel categories being divided into awards for Best Contemporary Soul Gospel Album and Best Traditional Gospel Album, both of which lasted until the 53rd Grammy Awards in 2011.

== Background ==
Prior to the category Best Soul Gospel Performance, Male or Female there were two categories separated by gender: Best Soul Gospel Performance, Female and Best Soul Gospel Performance, Male. Both awards were presented from 1984 to 1989. The first gender-neutral award was presented in 1990. In 1991, another category restructure resulted in the soul gospel categories being divided into awards for Best Contemporary Soul Gospel Album and Best Traditional Gospel Album (previously known as Best Soul Gospel Performance, Contemporary and Best Soul Gospel Performance, Traditional from 1978 to 1983), both of which lasted until the 53rd Grammy Awards in 2011.

== Recipients ==
Year	Winner(s)	Title	Nominees	Ref.
1990	Al Green	As Long As We're Together	Albertina Walker for My Time Is Not Over; Vickie Winans for Total Victory; Beau Williams for Wonderful; Daniel Winans for You Got a Choice to Make	

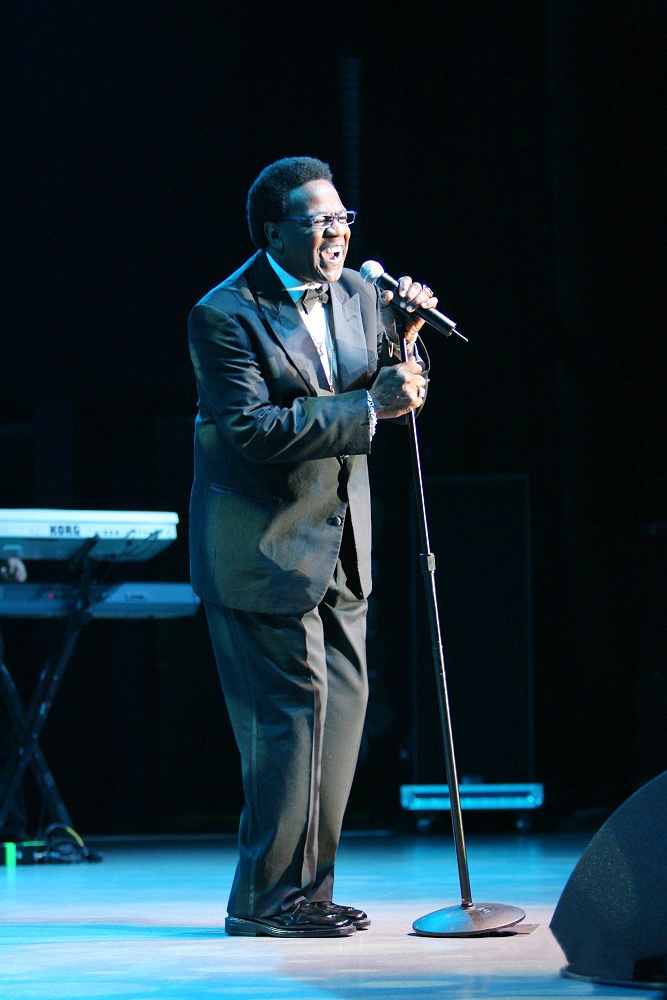
Award winner Al Green performing in May 2006

Nominees for Best Soul Gospel Performance, Male or Female included: Al Green for "As Long as We're Together", Albertina Walker for My Time Is Not Over, Beau Williams for Wonderful, Daniel Winans for "You Got a Choice to Make", and Vickie Winans for Total Victory. The "new jack swing remix" of "As Long as We're Together" was done by Al B. Sure! and Kyle West and appeared on Green's 1989 album I Get Joy, which reached peak positions of number 60 and number 13 on Billboard magazines' R&B Albums and Top Gospel Albums charts, respectively. Allmusic's Jason Elias criticized the remix for having "too much hardware". My Time Is Not Over, recorded in Tennessee, contained 1960's soul music "propelled by a choir's call-and-response" and reached number 33 on the Top Gospel Albums chart. Wonderful reached number 22 and number 2 on Billboards' Top Contemporary Christian and Top Gospel Albums charts, respectively, and earned Williams a Gospel Music Association (GMA) Dove Award for Best Traditional Black Gospel Recorded Song of the Year. Daniel Winans, a member of the Winans family, was also nominated for, and won, the Grammy Award for Best Soul Gospel Performance by a Duo or Group, Choir or Chorus for Let Brotherly Love Continue. Total Victory also charted on the Top Contemporary Christian and Top Gospel Albums charts, reaching peak positions of number 31 and number 7, respectively.

The award was presented to Green, who has received a total of eleven Grammy awards during his lifetime. In 1982, Green was presented the award for Best Soul Gospel Performance, Traditional for The Lord Will Make a Way, followed by awards for Best Soul Gospel Performance, Contemporary and Best Soul Gospel Performance, Traditional in 1983 for Higher Plane and Precious Lord, respectively. Green earned three awards for Best Soul Gospel Performance, Male: the first in 1984 for I'll Rise Again, another in 1987 for "Going Away" (from the album He Is the Light), and a third in 1988 for "Everything's Gonna Be Alright" (from the album Soul Survivor). The song "Sailin' on the Sea of Your Love" earned Shirley Caesar and Green the award for Best Soul Gospel Performance by a Duo or Group, Choir or Chorus in 1985. Green has earned three Grammy awards since his 1990 recognition for "As Long as We're Together"; in 1995 he and Lyle Lovett earned the first Grammy Award for Best Pop Collaboration with Vocals for "Funny How Time Slips Away", and in 2009 he was presented awards for Best Traditional R&B Vocal Performance for "You've Got the Love I Need" and Best R&B Performance by a Duo or Group with Vocals for "Stay with Me (By the Sea)". Of the other Best Soul Gospel Performance nominees for 1990, only Walker eventually earned a Grammy award (Best Traditional Soul Gospel Album in 1995 for Songs of the Church: Live in Memphis).

== See also ==
- Gospel Music Hall of Fame
- List of soul musicians
