= Tramaine Hawkins =

American gospel singer (born 1951)

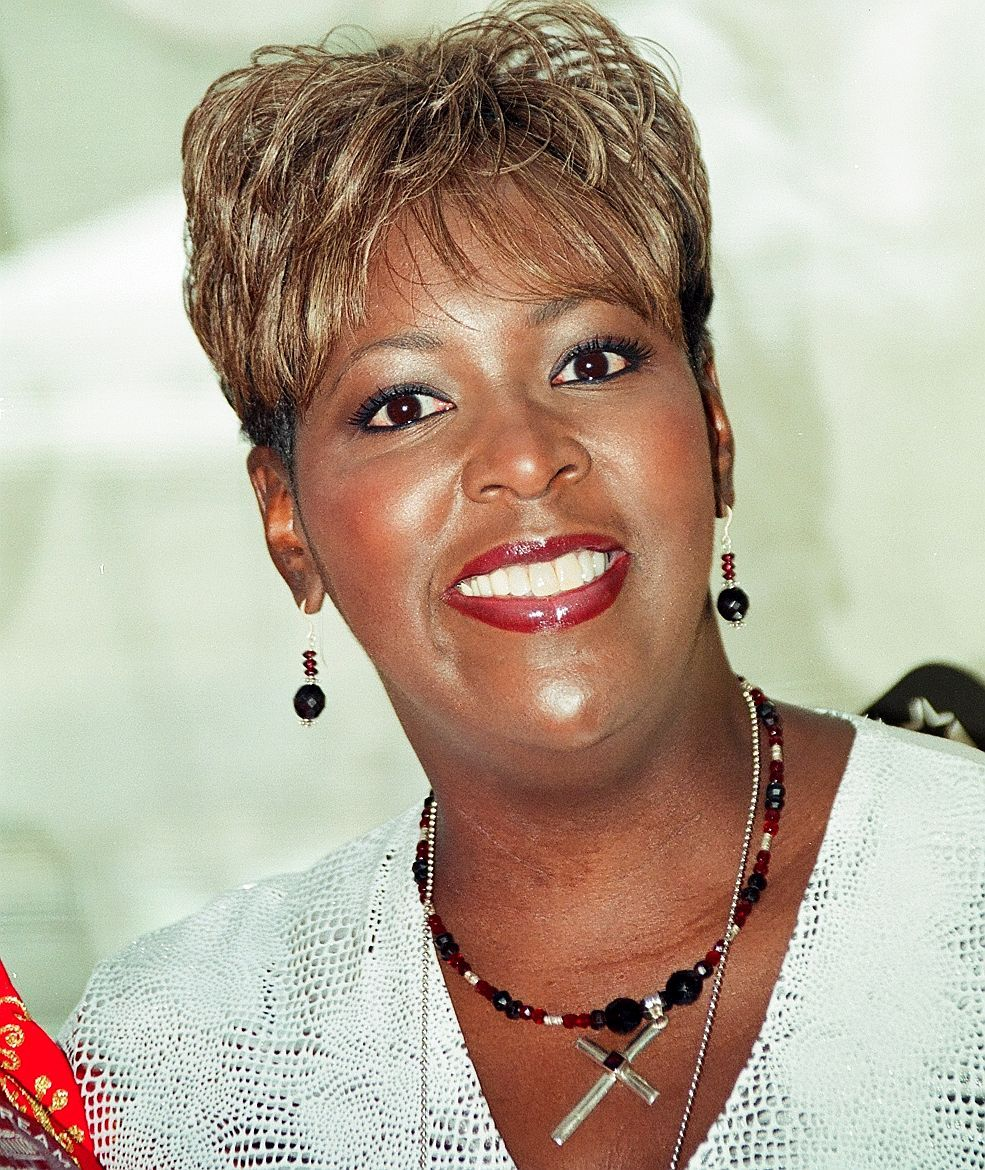
- Hawkins in 1999

Background information
- Also known as: Lady Tramaine Hawkins
- Born: Tramaine Aunzola Davis; October 11, 1951 (age 74); San Francisco, California, U.S.
- Genres: Christian; contemporary gospel; soul
- Occupation: Singer
- Instrument: Vocals
- Years active: 1966–present
- Labels: Light; A&M; Sparrow/Capitol; Columbia; EMI Gospel; GospoCentric
- Website: ladytramainehawkinsmusicministries.com

Tramaine Aunzola Richardson, (née Davis) known professionally as Tramaine/Tramaine Hawkins (born October 11, 1951), is an American award-winning Gospel singer whose career spans over five decades. Hawkins has won two Grammy Awards, two Dove Awards, and 19 Stellar Awards, and is a Gospel Music Hall of Fame inductee.

== Biography ==
=== Early life ===
Hawkins was born in San Francisco, California to Roland and Lois (Cleveland) Davis. She grew up in the Ephesians Church of God in Christ located in Berkeley, California, pastored by her grandfather, the late Bishop E.E. Cleveland.

While still in high school, Hawkins and her friends, Mary McCreary, Elva Mouton, and Vet Stone, had a gospel group called the Heavenly Tones that performed at various venues around the Oakland and San Francisco areas. In 1966 the group recorded the album I Love the Lord for the Gospel label, part of Savoy Records, and a 45 for the Music City label called He's Alright. When Stone's older brother Sylvester, better known as Sly Stone, formed Sly & the Family Stone with their brother Freddie and friends Larry Graham, Cynthia Robinson, Jerry Martini, and Greg Errico, the Heavenly Tones were recruited directly out of high school to become Little Sister, Sly & the Family Stone's background vocalists for their recording. Hawkins was briefly a member of the 1970s R&B/soul vocal group Honey Cone. The group's R&B hit "Want Ads" was later sampled on Mary Mary's 2005 hit "Heaven". Hawkins also briefly sang with Andraé Crouch and The Disciples, singing lead on their Grammy-nominated 1970 release "Christian People".

At the age of 17, Hawkins sang on Edwin Hawkins Singers' hit single "Oh Happy Day". With her distinctive soprano and extensive vocal range, she later became a member of late ex-husband Walter Hawkins' Love Center Choir and the Hawkins Family.

=== Solo career ===
Hawkins won her first Grammy Award in 1981 for her participation performance on "The Lord's Prayer", along with her then-husband Walter Hawkins. Her debut album, Tramaine, was released in 1979 on Light Records. This album was nominated for a Grammy Award in the category of Best Soul Gospel Performance, Contemporary. Her follow up LP, 1982's Determined was also Grammy-nominated, this time for Best Soul Gospel Performance, Female.

In the mid-1980s, she switched over to A&M Records to later release her 1985 Grammy nominated A&M debut The Search Is Over. With this album came dance chart singles such as "Child of the King" and "In the Morning Time". Another single "Fall Down (Spirit of Love)" topped the Billboard Dance Charts, becoming one of the earliest gospel songs to crossover to mainstream charts. A remake entitled "Fall Down 2000", later appeared on Kelli Williams' 2000 album In The Myx. A remix of the song also featured on Hawkins' 2001 compilation album All My Best To You, Vol. 2.

Freedom followed in 1987, with "The Rock" and its title track as the album's singles. The latter was co-written and produced by The Jacksons. Hawkins later signed with Sparrow Records to release 1988's The Joy That Floods My Soul, which was Grammy nominated in the category of Best Soul Gospel Performance, Female. She also won a Grammy in the category of Best Traditional Soul Gospel Performance, for 1990's Live, her first live album. She also sang at the May 1990 funeral of Sammy Davis Jr. and was a guest vocalist on Santana's June 1990 album Spirits Dancing in the Flesh.

Hawkins then sang on MC Hammer's 1991 pop-gospel hit "Do Not Pass Me By". Hawkins became one of the first gospel artists to sign with Columbia Records to release 1994's Grammy-nominated To a Higher Place. In 1999 Hawkins was inducted into the Gospel Music Hall of Fame. She then made a guest appearance on gospel trio Trin-i-tee 5:7's 1999 album Spiritual Love. After signing a new contract with GospoCentric Records, in 2001 Hawkins released Still Tramaine. This album featured remixes of her single "By His Strength" by the Basement Boys.

In 2005 Hawkins sang at the funeral service of civil rights activist Rosa Parks and performed on the Rosa Parks tribute album A Celebration of Quiet Strength, on a song called "Something Inside So Strong". At the 2007 Stellar Awards Hawkins was bestowed with the James Cleveland Lifetime Achievement Award, and won Female Vocalist of the Year and Traditional Female of the Year for her 2007 live album I Never Lost My Praise: Live. After this album's release Hawkins embarked on a tour across the United States. She then sang alongside Andraé Crouch, Rance Allen, Karen Clark Sheard, Walter Hawkins, Joe Ligon of the Mighty Clouds of Joy, Daryl Coley and Dorinda Clark-Cole on the 2008 Mary Mary album The Sound. Hawkins later made a guest appearance on Donnie McClurkin's 2014 album Duets.

== Personal life ==
While married to Walter Hawkins from 1971 until their divorce in 1994, the couple had two children, a son, Walter Jamie Hawkins (Sunny) and a daughter, Trystan Hawkins, with five granddaughters and three grandsons. Hawkins now refers to herself as "Lady Tramaine". She lives in California. She is now married to Tommie Richardson, Jr., who has son Demar Richardson (Chaity) from a previous relationship who has two sons. Richardson is a retired educator with Oakland Unified School District and founder of T. Richardson Investments.

== Awards ==
=== Grammy awards ===
Hawkins has won two Grammys out of eight nominations.

Year	Category	Nominated work	Result
1979	Best Soul Gospel Performance, Contemporary	"Tramaine (Album)"	Nominated
1979	Best Soul Gospel Performance, Contemporary	Push For Excellence (Album)	Nominated
1979	Best Gospel Performance, Contemporary Or Inspirational	"The Lord's Prayer"	Won
1982	Best Soul Gospel Performance, Female	Determined (Album)	Nominated
1985	Best Soul Gospel Performance, Female	The Search Is Over (Album)	Nominated
1987	Best Soul Gospel Performance, Female	The Joy That Floods My Soul (Album)	Nominated
1991	Best Traditional Soul Gospel Performance	"Tramaine Hawkins Live"	Won
1995	Best Contemporary Soul Gospel Album	To a Higher Place (Album)	Nominated
2002	Best Contemporary Soul Gospel Album	Still Tramaine	Nominated

== Discography ==
=== Albums ===
- 1966: I Love the Lord (Gospel Records) (as member of the gospel group The Heavenly Tones)
- 1979: Tramaine (Light)
- 1983: Determined (Light) – No. 6 Gospel
- 1986: The Search Is Over (A&M)^{T} – No. 2 Gospel, No. 33 R&B
- 1987: Freedom (A&M)^{T}
- 1988: The Joy That Floods My Soul (Sparrow/Capitol) – No. 5 Gospel, No. 33 Christian
- 1990: Live (Sparrow) – No. 2 Gospel, No. 25 Christian
- 1994: To a Higher Place (Columbia) – No. 4 Gospel
- 2001: Still Tramaine (GospoCentric)^{T} – No. 5 Gospel, No. 31 Heatseekers
- 2007: I Never Lost My Praise: Live (GospoCentric) – No. 12 Gospel

^{T} Denotes albums released as Tramaine only, as opposed to Tramaine Hawkins.

==== Compilations ====
- 1986: Tramaine Treasury (Light)
- 1994: All My Best to You (Sparrow) – No. 38 Gospel
- 2001: All My Best to You, Vol. 2 (EMI Gospel)
- 2002: Mega 3 Collection (Light)
- 2008: Gospel Legacy (Light)
- 2015: 20th Century Masters - The Millennium Collection - The Best Of

=== Singles ===
- 1966: "He's Alright" (Music City) (as member of the gospel group The Heavenly Tones)
- 1986: "Fall Down (Spirit of Love)" (A&M) – No. 1 Dance, No. 7 R&B, UK No. 60
- 1986: "Child of the King" (A&M)
- 1986: "In the Morning Time" (A&M) – No. 21 Dance, No. 26 R&B
- 1987: "The Rock" (A&M) - No. 22 Dance
- 1987: "Freedom" (A&M)
- 1992: "Do Not Pass Me By" (MC Hammer with Tramaine Hawkins) (Capitol/EMI) – No. 62 US, No. 15 R&B, No. 14 UK
- 1995: "I Found the Answer" (Columbia)
- 1995: "Who's Gonna Carry You" (Columbia)
- 2001: "By His Strength" (GospoCentric)
- 2007: "Excellent Lord" (GospoCentric)
- 2007: "I Never Lost My Praise" (GospoCentric)
- 2014: "My Past" (duet with Donnie McClurkin) (EMI Gospel)
