= 32nd Annual Grammy Awards =

1990 US music awards ceremony

- Date: February 21, 1990
- Location: Shrine Auditorium, Los Angeles, California
- Hosted by: Garry Shandling
- Most awards: Bonnie Raitt (4)
- Most nominations: Don Henley (6)

Television/radio coverage
- Network: CBS

The 32nd Annual Grammy Awards were held on February 21, 1990, and hosted by Garry Shandling. They recognized accomplishments by musicians from the previous year.

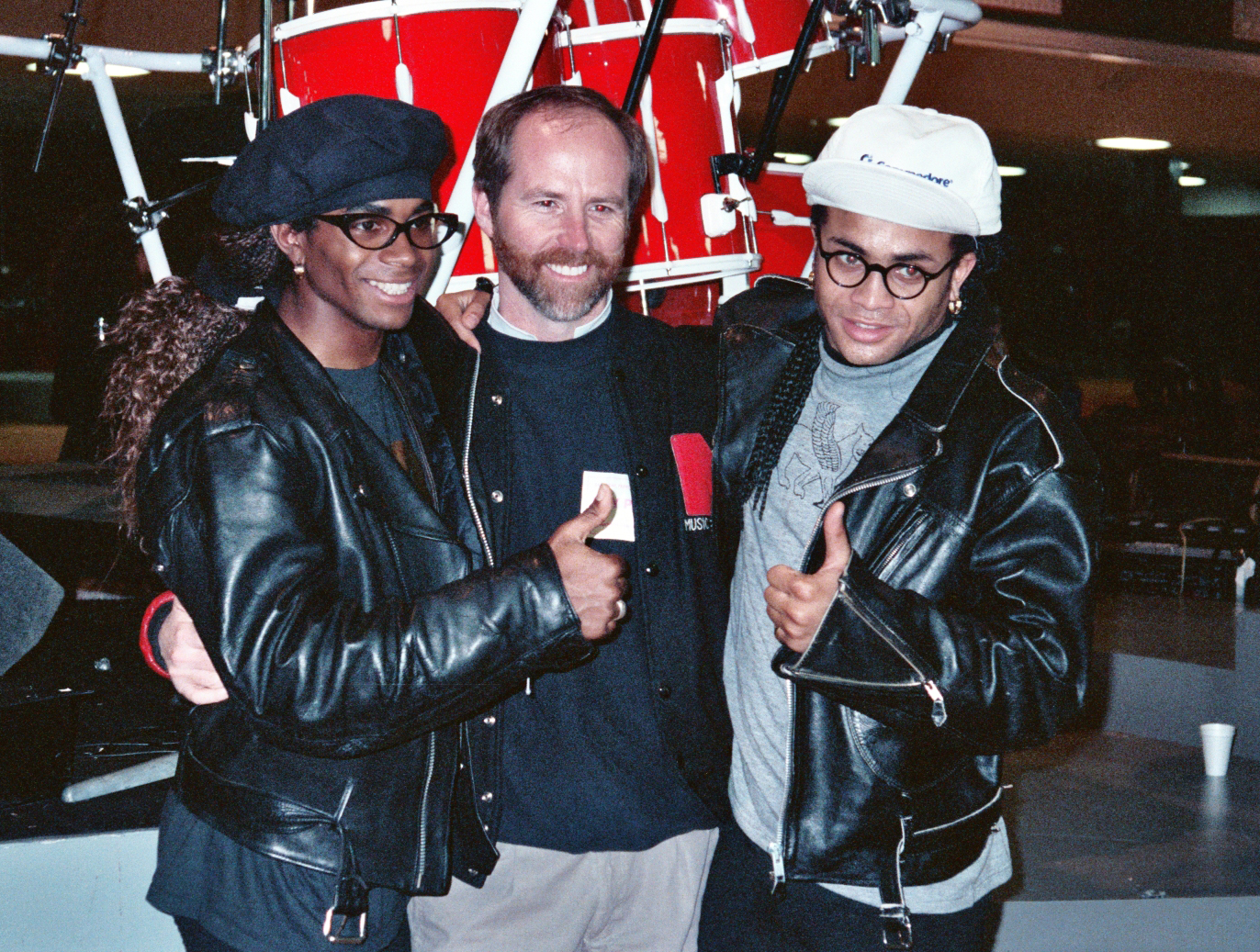
The Milli Vanilli duo pose with Michael Greene, chairman of NARAS, during the 1990 Grammys rehearsal.

== Performers ==
- Bette Midler - Wind Beneath My Wings
- Gloria Estefan - Don't Wanna Lose You
- Fine Young Cannibals - She Drives Me Crazy
- Michael Bolton & Kenny G - How Am I Supposed To Live Without You
- Don Henley - The End of the Innocence
- Rodney Crowell - After All This Time
- k.d. lang - Luck in My Eyes
- Billy Joel - We Didn't Start The Fire
- Bonnie Raitt - Thing Called Love
- Mike + The Mechanics - The Living Years
- Aaron Neville & Linda Ronstadt - Don't Know Much
- Milli Vanilli - Girl You Know It's True
- Ray Charles - Eleanor Rigby
- Stevie Wonder - We Can Work It Out
- DJ Jazzy Jeff & The Fresh Prince - I Think I Can Beat Mike Tyson
- Miles Davis - Hannibal

== Presenters ==
- Anita Baker, Sting & Stevie Wonder - Record of the Year
- Natalie Cole & Ella Fitzgerald - Album of the Year
- Michael Bolton & Kenny G - Song of the Year
- Kris Kristofferson & Young MC - Best New Artist
- Exposé & Randy Travis - Best Pop Performance by a Duo or Group with Vocals
- Patrick Swayze & Paula Abdul - Best Male Pop Vocal Performance
- Olivia Newton-John & Sam Kinison - Best Female Pop Vocal Performance
- B.B. King & John Lee Hooker - Best Female R&B Vocal Performance
- The Nitty Gritty Dirt Band & Dwight Yoakam - Best Male & Female Country Vocal Performance
- New Kids on the Block - Best Rap Performance
- Taylor Dayne & Mötley Crüe - Best Female Rock Vocal Performance
- Meryl Streep - Presents Paul McCartney with the Lifetime Achievement Award
- Bob Seger & Melissa Etheridge - Best Male Rock Vocal Performance
- Lou Reed & Dave Stewart (Eurythmics) - Producer of the Year

== Award winners ==
The Grammy Award for Best New Artist was originally awarded to Milli Vanilli, but the award was revoked by the National Academy of Recording Arts and Sciences on November 19, 1990 after the admission by band members Fab Morvan and Rob Pilatus that they did not sing on their album, Girl You Know It's True: the award was declared vacant. As of 2026, this is the only occasion that a Grammy award has been revoked.

=== General ===
- Record of the Year
  - Arif Mardin (producer) & Bette Midler (artist) for "Wind Beneath My Wings"
  - Don Henley, Bruce Hornsby (producers) & Don Henley (artist) for "The End of the Innocence"
  - Christopher Neil, Mike Rutherford (producers) & Mike + The Mechanics (artist) for "The Living Years"
  - David Z. Fine, Fine Young Cannibals (producers) & Fine Young Cannibals (artist) for "She Drives Me Crazy"
  - Mick Jones, Billy Joel (producers) & Billy Joel (artist) for "We Didn't Start The Fire"
- Album of the Year
  - Don Was (producer) & Bonnie Raitt for Nick of Time
  - Don Henley, Danny Kortchmar (producers) & Don Henley (artist) for The End of the Innocence
  - Jeff Lynne, Tom Petty, Mike Campbell (producers) & Tom Petty (artist) for Full Moon Fever
  - Fine Young Cannibals (producers) & Fine Young Cannibals (artist) for The Raw & the Cooked
  - Jeff Lynne, George Harrison (producers) & Traveling Wilburys (artists) for Traveling Wilburys Vol. 1
- Song of the Year
  - Jeff Silbar & Larry Henley (songwriters) for "Wind Beneath My Wings" performed by Bette Midler

=== Blues ===
- Best Traditional Blues Recording
  - Bonnie Raitt & John Lee Hooker for "I'm in the Mood"
- Best Contemporary Blues Recording
  - Stevie Ray Vaughan & Double Trouble for In Step

=== Children's ===
- Best Recording for Children
  - J. Aaron Brown, David R. Lehman (producers) & Tanya Goodman for The Rock-A-Bye Collection, Vol. 1

=== Classical ===
- Best Orchestral Performance
  - Leonard Bernstein (conductor) & the New York Philharmonic for Mahler: Symphony No. 3 in D Minor
- Best Classical Vocal Soloist Performance
  - David Zinman (conductor), Dawn Upshaw & the Orchestra of St. Luke's for Knoxville - Summer of 1915 (Music of Barber, Menotti, Harbison, Stravinsky)
- Best Opera Recording
  - Cord Garben (producer), James Levine (conductor), Hildegard Behrens, Gary Lakes, Christa Ludwig, Kurt Moll, James Morris, Jessye Norman & the Metropolitan Opera Orchestra for Wagner: Die Walküre
- Best Choral Performance (other than opera)
  - Robert Shaw (conductor), the Atlanta Symphony Orchestra & Chorus, and the Atlanta Boy Choir for Britten: War Requiem
- Best Classical Performance, Instrumental Soloist (with orchestra)
  - David Zinman (conductor), Yo-Yo Ma & the Baltimore Symphony Orchestra for Barber: Cello Concerto, Op. 22/Britten: Symphony for Cello and Orchestra, Op. 68
- Best Classical Performance - Instrumental Soloist (without orchestra)
  - Andras Schiff for Bach: English Suites
- Best Chamber Music Performance
  - The Emerson String Quartet for Bartók: 6 String Quartets
- Best Contemporary Composition
  - Steve Reich (composer) & the Kronos Quartet for Reich: Different Trains
- Best Classical Album
  - Wolf Erichson (producer) & the Emerson String Quartet for Bartók: 6 String Quartets

=== Comedy ===
- Best Comedy Recording
  - Peter Schickele for P.D.Q. Bach: 1712 Overture and Other Musical Assaults

=== Composing and arranging ===
- Best Instrumental Composition
  - Danny Elfman (composer) for "The Batman Theme" performed by the Sinfonia of London Orchestra
- Best Song Written Specifically for a Motion Picture or Television
  - Carly Simon (songwriter) for "Let the River Run"
- Best Album of Original Instrumental Background Score Written for a Motion Picture or Television
  - Dave Grusin (composer) for The Fabulous Baker Boys
- Best Arrangement on an Instrumental
  - Dave Grusin (arranger) for "Suite From The Milagro Beanfield War"
- Best Instrumental Arrangement Accompanying Vocals
  - Dave Grusin (arranger) for "My Funny Valentine" performed by Michelle Pfeiffer

=== Country ===
- Best Country Vocal Performance, Female
  - k.d. lang for Absolute Torch and Twang
- Best Country Vocal Performance, Male
  - Lyle Lovett for Lyle Lovett and His Large Band
- Best Country Performance by a Duo or Group with Vocal
  - Nitty Gritty Dirt Band for Will the Circle Be Unbroken: Volume Two
- Best Country Vocal Collaboration
  - Hank Williams Jr. & Hank Williams Sr. for "There's a Tear in My Beer"
- Best Country Instrumental Performance
  - Randy Scruggs for "Amazing Grace"
- Best Country Song
  - Rodney Crowell (songwriter) for "After All This Time"
- Best Bluegrass Recording
  - Bruce Hornsby & Nitty Gritty Dirt Band for "The Valley Road"

=== Folk ===
- Best Traditional Folk Recording
  - Marcel Cellier (producer) for Le Mystere des Voix Bulgares, Vol. II performed by the Bulgarian State Television Female Vocal Choir
- Best Contemporary Folk Recording
  - Indigo Girls for Indigo Girls

=== Gospel ===
- Best Gospel Vocal Performance, Female
  - CeCe Winans for "Don't Cry"
- Best Gospel Vocal Performance, Male
  - BeBe Winans for "Meantime"
- Best Gospel Vocal Performance by a Duo or Group, Choir or Chorus
  - Take 6 for "The Savior Is Waiting"
- Grammy Award for Best Soul Gospel Performance, Male or Female
  - Al Green for "As Long as We're Together"
- Best Soul Gospel Performance by a Duo or Group, Choir or Chorus
  - Daniel Winans for "Let Brotherly Love Continue"

=== Historical ===
- Best Historical Album
  - Andy McKaie (producer) for Chuck Berry - The Chess Box

=== Jazz ===
- Best Jazz Vocal Performance, Female
  - Ruth Brown for Blues on Broadway
- Best Jazz Vocal Performance, Male
  - Harry Connick Jr. for When Harry Met Sally
- Best Jazz Vocal Performance, Duo or Group
  - Dr. John & Rickie Lee Jones for "Makin' Whoopee"
- Best Jazz Instrumental Performance, Soloist (On a Jazz Recording)
  - Miles Davis for Aura
- Best Jazz Instrumental Performance, Group
  - Chick Corea Akoustic Band for Chick Corea Akoustic Band
- Best Jazz Instrumental Performance, Big Band
  - Miles Davis for Aura
- Best Jazz Fusion Performance
  - Pat Metheny Group for Letter from Home

=== Latin ===
- Best Latin Pop Performance
  - Jose Feliciano for "Cielito Lindo"
- Best Tropical Latin Performance
  - Ray Barretto & Celia Cruz for Ritmo en el Corazon
- Best Mexican-American Performance
  - Los Lobos for La pistola y el corazón

=== Musical show ===
- Best Musical Cast Show Album
  - Jay David Saks (producer) & the original cast with Jason Alexander & Debbie Shapiro & Robert La Fasse for Jerome Robbins' Broadway

=== Music video ===
- Best Music Video, Short Form
  - Jim Blashfield, Paul Diener, Frank DiLeo, Jerry Kramer, (video producers), Jim Blashfield (video director) & Michael Jackson for "Leave Me Alone"
- Best Music Video, Long Form
  - Aris McGarry (video producer), Jonathan Dayton and Valerie Faris (video producers & directors), Dominic Sena (video director), & Janet Jackson for Rhythm Nation 1814

=== New Age ===
- Best New Age Performance
  - Peter Gabriel for Passion - Music For the Last Temptation of Christ

=== Packaging and notes ===
- Best Album Package
  - Roger Gorman (art director) for Sound + Vision performed by David Bowie
- Best Album Notes
  - Phil Schaap (notes writer) for Bird - The Complete Charlie Parker on Verve

=== Polka ===
- Best Polka Recording
  - Jimmy Sturr for All in My Love for You

=== Pop ===
- Best Pop Vocal Performance, Female
  - Bonnie Raitt for "Nick of Time"
- Best Pop Vocal Performance, Male
  - Michael Bolton for "How Am I Supposed to Live Without You"
- Best Pop Performance by a Duo or Group with Vocal
  - Aaron Neville & Linda Ronstadt for "Don't Know Much"
- Best Pop Instrumental Performance
  - The Neville Brothers for "Healing Chant"

=== Production and engineering ===
- Best Engineered Recording, Non-Classical
  - George Massenburg (engineer) for Cry Like a Rainstorm - Howl Like the Wind performed by Linda Ronstadt
- Best Engineered Recording, Classical
  - Jack Renner (engineer), Robert Shaw (conductor), the Atlanta Symphony Orchestra & the Atlanta Boy Choir for Britten: War Requiem
- Producer of the Year
  - Peter Asher
- Classical Producer of the Year
  - Robert Woods

=== R&B ===
- Best R&B Vocal Performance, Female
  - Anita Baker for Giving You the Best That I Got
- Best R&B Vocal Performance, Male
  - Bobby Brown for "Every Little Step"
- Best R&B Performance by a Duo or Group with Vocal
  - Soul II Soul & Caron Wheeler for "Back to Life"
- Best R&B Instrumental Performance
  - Soul II Soul for "African Dance"
- Best Rhythm & Blues Song
  - Kenny Gamble & Leon Huff (songwriters) for "If You Don't Know Me By Now" performed by Simply Red

=== Rap ===
- Best Rap Performance
  - Young MC for "Bust a Move"

=== Reggae ===
- Best Reggae Recording
  - Ziggy Marley & the Melody Makers for One Bright Day

=== Rock ===
- Best Rock Vocal Performance, Female
  - Bonnie Raitt for Nick of Time
- Best Rock Vocal Performance, Male
  - Don Henley for The End of the Innocence
- Best Rock Performance by a Duo or Group with Vocal
  - Traveling Wilburys for Traveling Wilburys Vol. 1
- Best Rock Instrumental Performance
  - Jeff Beck, Terry Bozzio & Tony Hymas for Jeff Beck's Guitar Shop with Terry Bozzio & Tony Hymas
- Best Hard Rock Performance
  - Living Colour for "Cult of Personality"
- Best Metal Performance
  - Metallica for "One"

=== Spoken ===
- Best Spoken Word or Non-musical Recording
  - Gilda Radner for It's Always Something (awarded posthumously)

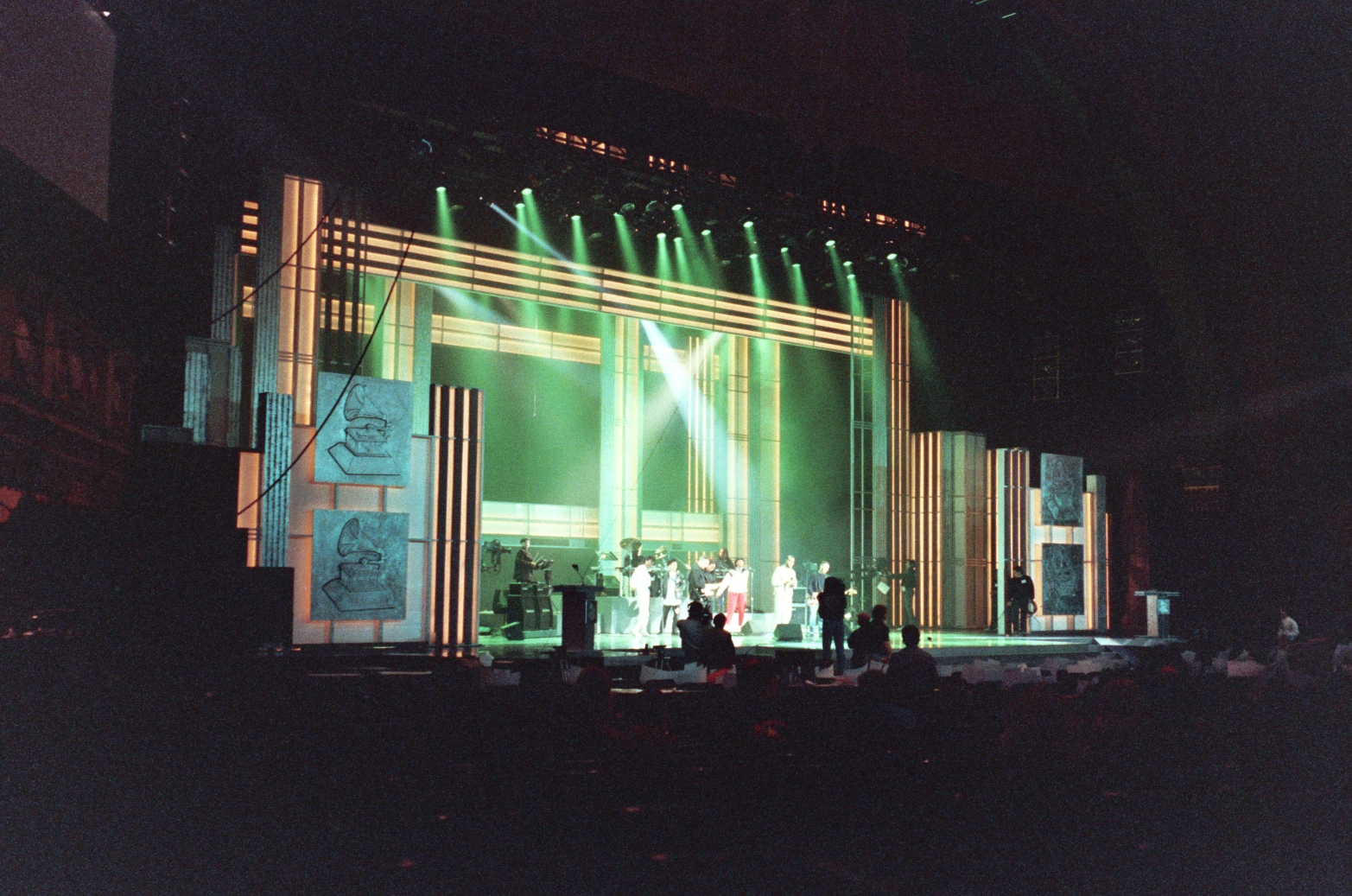
Fine Young Cannibals rehearsing for the Grammys.

== Special Merit Awards ==
=== Lifetime Achievement Award ===
- Nat "King" Cole
- Miles Davis
- Vladimir Horowitz
- Paul McCartney

=== Grammy Legend Award ===
- Andrew Lloyd Webber
- Liza Minnelli
- Smokey Robinson
- Willie Nelson
