= Yvette Flunder =

Bishop of the United Church of Christ

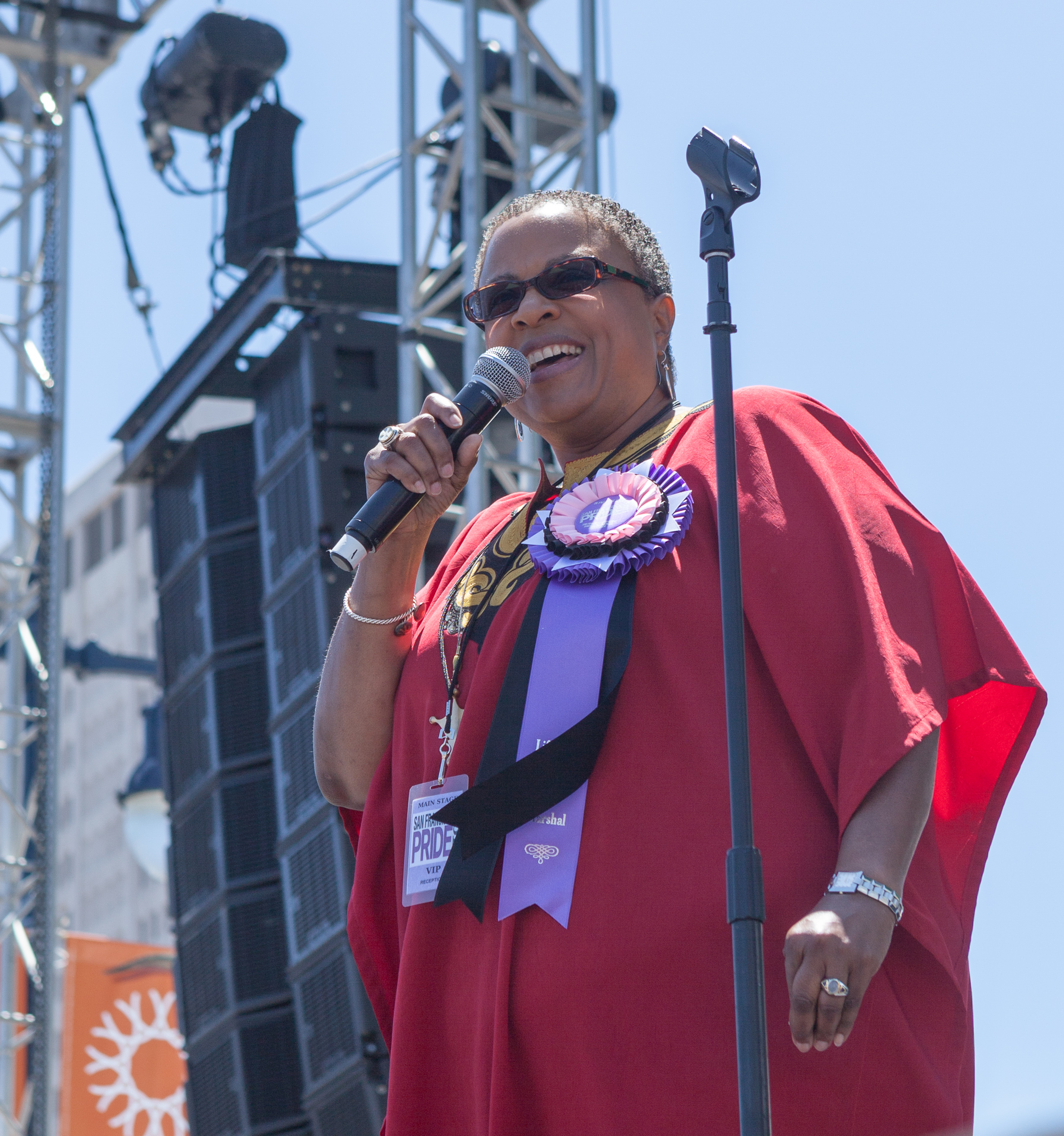
- Flunder singing at 2011 San Francisco Pride
- Church: United Church of Christ

Orders
- Ordination: by Walter Hawkins

Personal details
- Born: July 29, 1955 (age 71) San Francisco, California, U.S.
- Spouse: Shirley Miller

Yvette A. Flunder (born July 29, 1955) is an American womanist, pastor, activist, and singer from San Francisco, California. Currently, she is the senior pastor of City of Refuge United Church of Christ in Oakland, California and Presiding Bishop of The Fellowship of Affirming Ministries.

== Early life, education, ministry ==
=== Early life ===
Yvette Flunder, who is African American, was born on July 29, 1955 in San Francisco, California. She was raised in the Bay Area as well as in Mississippi. When young, Flunder attended a Church of God in Christ (COGIC), and graduated high school at the COGIC's Saints Academy in Lexington, Mississippi before returning to California.

=== Education, music, ministry ===
Following high school, Flunder attended College of San Mateo, earning her bachelor's degree. In 1984, Flunder began singing and recording with Walter Hawkins and Hawkins' Love Center Choir as a lead singer.

In 1986, Flunder was moved to minister to people with HIV/AIDS in response to the epidemic of the 1980s. She founded several not-for-profit enterprises in the San Francisco Bay Area, providing services for people affected by HIV: Hazard-Ashley House, Walker House and Restoration House, through the Ark of Refuge, Inc., which later became the Y. A. Flunder Foundation.

Having been previously ordained by Walter Hawkins, Flunder received a Certificate of Ministry Studies in 1991 and a Master of Arts in 1997 from the Pacific School of Religion. In 2001, Flunder was awarded a Doctor of Ministry degree from San Francisco Theological Seminary.

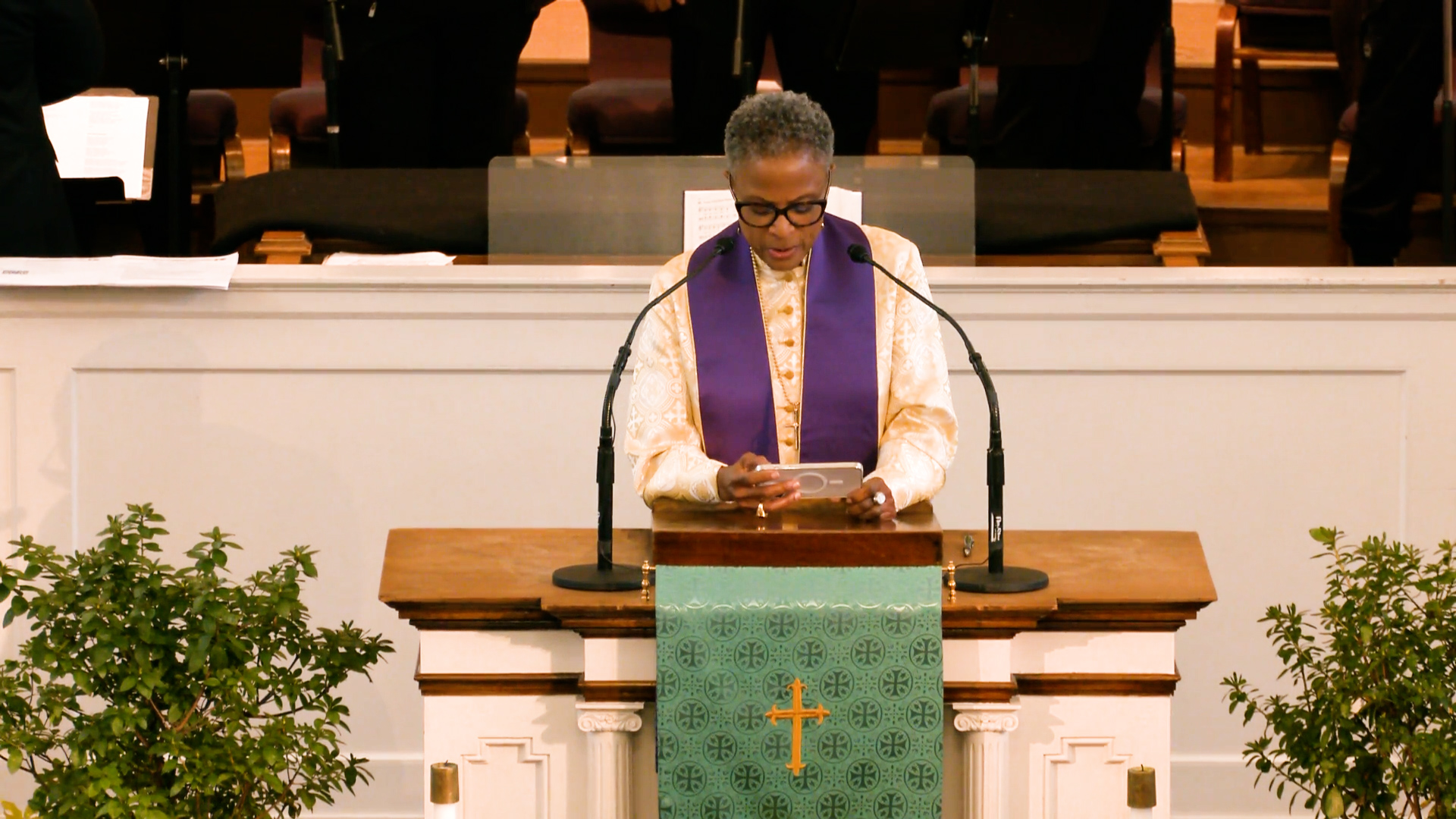
Bishop Flunder in church, 2023

Also in 1991, Flunder founded City of Refuge church under the denominational umbrella of the United Church of Christ, "in order to unite a gospel ministry with a social ministry". She describes City of Refuge UCC as an effort to "create a spiritual community that will embrace our collective cultures, faith paths, gender expressions, and sexual/affectional orientations while simultaneously freeing us from oppressive theologies that subjugate women, denigrate the LGBT community, and disconnect us from justice issues locally and globally". The Transcendence Gospel Choir was a community choir affiliated with the City of Refuge and was the first all-transgender choir in the United States.

In 2000, Flunder founded the Fellowship of Affirming Ministries, a trans-denominational coalition of churches that "desire to celebrate and proclaim the radically inclusive love of Jesus Christ",. She was appointed Presiding Bishop of the organization in 2003.

== Activism and honors ==
Flunder identifies as a womanist and a reconciling liberation theologian. In 2005, she authored a book, Where the Edge Gathers: Building a Community of Radical Inclusion. Prior to his death in 2023, Carlton Pearson named Flunder among the first religious leaders to embrace and encourage him after he was declared a heretic due to coming out in support of universal reconciliation.

In 2013, Flunder was named as a distinguished alumnus of the Pacific School of Religion. On December 1, 2014, Flunder was a keynote speaker in the White House for World AIDS Day, where she spoke about AIDS education and described the harmful effects of stigma and homophobia toward those living with HIV. The following year she was a guest speaker at American Baptist College's Garnett-Nabrit Lecture Series.

Since 2015, Flunder has been a member of the board of trustees of the Starr King School for the Ministry and also served as a member of the Presidential Advisory Council on HIV/AIDS.

== Personal life ==
Flunder's spouse is singer Shirley Miller, cousin of Walter Hawkins. The couple has been together since the mid-1980s.

== Film, television and media ==
Flunder was portrayed by actress Phylicia Rashad for the final 3-part episode as part of the Dustin Lance Black mini-series When We Rise on March 3, 2017, on the major television network ABC. The Bishop's role in the show highlights the compassion of the church, the commitment of its leadership and the loving home the church provides to minister in the tough, primarily African-American community in San Francisco.

Flunder was portrayed by Joni Bovill in the Joshua Marston drama film Come Sunday, which premiered at the 2018 Sundance Film Festival and was released on Netflix in April 2018.

In 2021, Flunder was featured in PBS's "The Black Church: This is our story, this is our song." Also in 2021, she was a panelist for "Fire and Desire" the Smithsonian National Museum of African American History and Culture's Center for the Study of African American Religious Life as they discussed "Black Male Gospel Music Performance."

Flunder's ministry, interests, and activism are represented online through her participation in various social media platforms.

== Bibliography ==
- Those Preaching Women: A Multicultural Collection (1985)
- Birthing the Sermon: Women Preachers on the Creative Process (2001)
- Where the Edge Gathers: Building a Community of Radical Inclusion (2005)
- Queer Christianities: Lived Religion in Transgressive Forms (2014)
