= Patrick Lundy =

American songwriter

- Born: Patrick P. Lundy; March 1967 (age 59); Thomasville, Georgia
- Origin: Washington, D.C.
- Genres: Gospel, traditional black gospel, urban contemporary gospel
- Occupations: Singer, songwriter
- Instruments: Vocals, singer-songwriter
- Years active: 1995–present
- Labels: Allen & Allen, Meridian
- Website: plundymom.com

Patrick P. Lundy (born March 1967) is an American gospel musician and founder/director of Patrick Lundy and The Ministers of Music, based out of Washington, D.C.. His first album, We Sing the Power, was released in 1995. The second album, You Carried Me, was released in 1998. He released the third album, Standin' in 2003 with Allen & Allen Music Group. His four album, In the Fellowship, was released in 2005 by Meridian, and it was his Billboard magazine breakthrough release upon the Gospel Albums chart.

== Early life ==
Lundy was born in March 1967 in Thomasville, Georgia, the son of Charlie B. Lundy and Mary Lundy. He is a graduate of Howard University, where he received his bachelor's degree in music business.

== Music career ==
Lundy formed The Ministers of Music in November 1994 at Ebenezer AME Church located in Fort Washington, Maryland. He started his recording music career in 1995, with the release of We Sing the Power. The subsequent album, You Carried Me, was released in 1998. His third album, Standin', was released in 2003 by Allen & Allen Music Group. and it was produced by Dorothy Norwood. The fourth album, In the Fellowship, was released by Meridian Records on September 13, 2005, and this was his breakthrough release upon the Billboard magazine Gospel Albums chart at No. 29. His fifth album, Determined, was released in 2007, yet this failed to chart.

== Discography ==
List of selected studio albums, with selected chart positions
Title	Album details	Peak chart positions
Title	Album details	US Gos
We Sing the Power	Released: 1995; Label: *; CD, digital download	*
Standin'	Released: September 9, 2003; Label: Meridian; CD, digital download	*
In the Fellowship	Released: September 13, 2005; Label: Meridian; CD, digital download	29
Determined	Released: April 10, 2012; Label: Central South; CD, digital download	*
Majesty	Released: October 5, 2014; Label: *; CD, digital download	*
By Faith	Released: November 10, 2017; Label: Daywind Records; CD, digital download	*
