= Grammy Award for Best Soul Gospel Performance, Male =

Annual music award from 1984 to 1989

The Grammy Award for Best Soul Gospel Performance, Male was awarded from 1984 to 1989. In 1990 this award was combined with the award for Best Soul Gospel Performance, Female as the Grammy Award for Best Soul Gospel Performance, Male or Female.

Years reflect the year in which the Grammy Awards were presented, for works released in the previous year.

== Recipients ==
Year	Winner(s)	Title	Nominees	Ref.
1984	Al Green	I'll Rise Again	Leon Patillo for Cornerstone; Morris Chapman for Longtime Friends; Solomon Burke for Precious Lord, Take My Hand; Thomas A. Dorsey for Take My Hand Precious Lord	
1985	Andraé Crouch	Always Remember'	Jessy Dixon for Sanctuary; James Cleveland for The Prayer; Al Green for Trust In God; Mel Carter for Willing	
1986	Marvin Winans	Bring Back the Days of Yea and Nay	Rev. Marvin Yancy for Heavy Load; Howard McCrary for So Good; Philip Nicholas for Stop Your Searchin' (Try God!); Douglas Miller for Unspeakable Joy	
1987	Al Green	Going Away	Derrick Brinkley for Glorious Day; Daryl Coley for Just Daryl; Howard Smith for Totally Committed; Rodney Friend for Worthy	
1988	Al Green	Everything's Gonna Be Alright	Keith Pringle for All to You; BeBe Winans for Call Me; Jessy Dixon for The Winning Side; Wintley Phipps for Wintley Phipps	
1989	BeBe Winans	Abundant Life	Melvin Williams for Back to the Cross; Marvin Winans for Dancin' in the Spirit; Walter Hawkins for Solo Tracks from Special Gift; Richard Smallwood for You Did It All	
