= Lee Magid =

American R&B producer and manager (1926–2007)

- Born: Leon Magid; April 6, 1926; New York City, U.S.
- Died: March 31, 2007 (aged 80) Malibu, California, U.S.
- Genres: R&B
- Occupations: Record producer A&R scout Manager
- Years active: 1940s–1990s
- Labels: National; Savoy

Lee Magid (born Leon Magid; April 6, 1926 – March 31, 2007) was an American rhythm and blues producer and manager, who worked with artists such as Clara Ward, Al Hibbler, Sam Fletcher, and Della Reese.

Steve Kurutz of AllMusic described Magid as an "old-time record hustler [who] held a position in nearly every facet of the industry at one time or another."

== Life and career ==
Born in New York City to a Jewish family, Magid started playing trumpet and preparing arrangements in his teens, and worked as a song plugger. Around 1945, he started working for Al Green, owner of National Records. Recognizing Magid's ability to place R&B records on white radio stations, Green soon promoted him to an A&R position. Majid also started producing recordings with musicians such as Big Joe Turner, Charlie Ventura, and the Ward Singers.

Feeling that his creative input was constrained by Green's tight budgetary control, Magid moved to Herman Lubinsky's Savoy label, and continued to produce records, working with engineer Tom Dowd. As producer, songwriter, and A&R man, and working with others including Ralph Bass, Magid found commercial success with Johnny Otis and Little Esther.

In 1953, Magid signed singer Al Hibbler, soon becoming his manager and securing his record deal with Decca Records. Increasingly taking on the duties of manager rather than producer, Magid also discovered and managed Della Reese, and later managed Lou Rawls, Earl Grant and Sam Fletcher, among others.

In addition to his work as producer and manager, Magid also worked as a club owner, music publisher, and lyricist, and was involved in the careers of T-Bone Walker, Marian McPartland, O. C. Smith, Eddie "Cleanhead" Vinson, and Marlena Shaw, among others. During the 1980s and 1990s, Magid was the manager of gospel star Tramaine Hawkins and jazz crossover electric violinist Marius Kahan.

Magid died in Malibu, California, on March 31, 2007, aged 80; he was survived by his four children: Diane Magid, Deborah Magid Kagay, Adam Magid and Andrea Magid Hall Phinney.

== Other sources ==
- Who's Who in America, 53rd edition, 1999, Marquis Who's Who, New Providence, NJ (1998) OCLC 40048997 ISBN 083790191X ISBN 9780837901916
- Who's Who in America, 54th edition, 2000, Marquis Who's Who, New Providence, NJ (1999) OCLC 42920692
- Who's Who in America, 56th edition, 2002, Marquis Who's Who, New Providence, NJ (2001) OCLC 48556900 ISBN 0837969581 ISBN 9780837969589 ISBN 083796959X ISBN 9780837969596 ISBN 083796962X ISBN 9780837969626 ISBN 0837969638 ISBN 9780837969633
- Who's Who in America, 57th edition, 2003, Marquis Who's Who, New Providence, NJ (2002) OCLC 50265635 ISBN 0837969662 ISBN 9780837969664
- Who's Who in Entertainment, Second edition, 1992–1993, Marquis Who's Who, Wilmette, IL (1992) OCLC 469878631 ISBN 0837918510 ISBN 9780837918518
- Who's Who in Entertainment, Third edition, 1998–1999, Marquis Who's Who, New Providence, NJ (1997) OCLC 38740408 ISBN 083791857X ISBN 9780837918570
- Who's Who in the World, 16th edition, 1999, Marquis Who's Who, New Providence, NJ (1999) OCLC 464529090 ISBN 0837911222 ISBN 9780837911229
