= Kelli Williams (musician) =

American gospel musician (born 1978)

- Also known as: Kelli Malcolm
- Born: Kelli Evon Williams; June 1978 (age 48); Nashville, Tennessee
- Origin: Portland, Tennessee
- Genres: Gospel, traditional black gospel, urban contemporary gospel
- Occupations: Singer, songwriter
- Instruments: vocals, singer-songwriter
- Years active: 1995–present
- Labels: Sony, Word, Epic

Kelli Evon Williams-Malcolm (born June 1978) is an American gospel musician. Her first album, Kelli Williams, was released by Sony Music Entertainment in 1995. The subsequent album, I Get Lifted, was released in 1998 by Word Records in association with Epic Records, and this was a Billboard magazine breakthrough release upon the Gospel Albums chart. She released, In the Myx, with Word Records in tandem with Epic Records in 2000.

== Early life ==
Williams-Malcolm was born as Kelli Evon Williams, in June 1978, to father, Eddie, and mother, Carolyn, in Nashville, Tennessee. She sang professionally at ten years old. In 1993, Williams-Malcolm appeared on Star Search, which she won.

== Music career ==
Her music recording career commenced in 1995, with the album, Kelli Williams, and it was released by Sony Music Entertainment. The second album, I Get Lifted, was released on February 17, 1998 by Word Records and Epic Records, and this was her Billboard magazine breakthrough release upon the Gospel Albums chart at No. 35. She released, In the Myx, on July 4, 2000 with Word Records and Epic Records.

== Personal life ==
Williams-Malcolm is married to Royce Edward Malcolm. They reside in Portland, Tennessee with their son, Bentley Edward Malcolm, who was born May 2003.

== Discography ==
List of selected studio albums, with selected chart positions
Title	Album details	Peak chart positions
Title	Album details	US Gos
I Get Lifted	Released: February 17, 1998; Label: Word/Epic; CD, digital download	35
In the Myx (of your Will)	Released: July 4, 2000; Label: Word/Epic; CD, digital download	40
