= Grammy Award for Best Soul Gospel Performance, Female =

Annual music award from 1984 to 1989

The Grammy Award for Best Soul Gospel Performance, Female was awarded from 1984 to 1989. In 1990 this award was combined with the award for Best Soul Gospel Performance, Male as the Grammy Award for Best Soul Gospel Performance, Male or Female.

Years reflect the year in which the Grammy Awards were presented, for works released in the previous year.

== Recipients ==
Year	Winner(s)	Title	Nominees	Ref.
1984	Sandra Crouch	We Sing Praises	Tramaine Hawkins for Determined; Albertina Walker for God Is Able to Carry You Through; Shirley Caesar for Jesus, I Love Calling Your Name; Candi Staton for Make Me an Instrument; Vanessa Bell Armstrong for Peace Be Still	
1985	Shirley Caesar	Sailin'	Kristle Edwards for Jesus, Come Lay Your Head On Me; Tata Vega for Oh, It Is Jesus; Albertina Walker for The Impossible Dream; Danniebelle Hall for Unmistakably Danniebelle	
1986	Shirley Caesar	Martin	Vernessa Mitchell for Blessed Assurance; Vanessa Bell Armstrong for Chosen; Deleon Richards for Deleon; Dorothy Norwood for Lift Him Up	
1987	Deniece Williams	"I Surrender All"	Shirley Caesar for Celebration; Candi Staton for Sing a Song; Albertina Walker for Spirit; Tramaine for The Search Is Over	
1988	CeCe Winans	For Always	Lynette Hawkins Stephens for Baby Sis; Vickie Winans for Be Encouraged; Shirley Caesar for The Lord Will Make a Way; Della Reese for You Gave Me Love	
1989	Aretha Franklin	One Lord, One Faith, One Baptism	CeCe Winans for I Have a Father; Shirley Caesar for Live... In Chicago; Vanessa Bell Armstrong for Pressing On; Tramaine Hawkins for The Joy That Floods My Soul	

== See also ==
- List of music awards honoring women
