= Walter Hawkins =

American gospel singer (1949–2010)

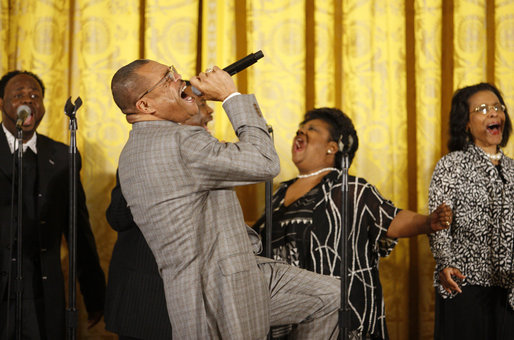
- Hawkins performed on stage in the East Room of the White House, where he was joined on stage by his brother Edwin, Tuesday, June 17, 2008, in honor of Black Music Month.

Background information
- Born: Walter Lee Hawkins; May 18, 1949; Oakland, California, U.S.
- Died: July 11, 2010 (aged 61) Ripon, California, U.S.
- Genre: Gospel
- Occupations: Pastor, singer, songwriter, producer
- Instruments: Vocals, piano, keyboards
- Years active: 1960s–2010
- Labels: Light, Birthright, Malaco, GospoCentric, Interscope, Coda Records
- Formerly of: Tramaine Hawkins, Edwin Hawkins, Andraé Crouch

Walter Lee Hawkins (May 18, 1949 – July 11, 2010) was an American gospel singer, songwriter, composer, and pastor. An influential figure in urban contemporary gospel music, his career spanned more than four decades. Hawkins won one Grammy from a sum of eight nominations.

== Biography ==
Walter Lee Hawkins was born on May 18, 1949 in Oakland, California to Dan Lee Hawkins and Mamie Vivian Hawkins (née Matthews). Hawkins was the brother of gospel musician Edwin Hawkins (1943–2018), with whom he first began recording music as a fundraising effort for the Church of God in Christ.

Hawkins started his career in one of his brother's chorales, the Northern California State Youth Choir of the Church of God in Christ. The choir recorded an album in 1968 as a local fundraiser. When a song from that album, "Oh Happy Day", became a crossover hit, Buddah Records purchased the master and released it as "the Edwin Hawkins Singers". This led to him accompanying his brother Edwin to establish the Edwin Hawkins Singers.

Walter Hawkins left the Edwin Hawkins Singers in the early 1970s to establish the Love Center Church in Oakland, California. He and his Love Center Choir had considerable success with their Love Alive series of recordings, which sold well over a million copies from the 1970s through the 1990s. Love Alive IV, released in 1990, was No. 1 on the Billboard Gospel Album charts, where it stayed for 33 weeks. In all, Walter Hawkins produced and/or collaborated on 116 hit songs which were listed on the Billboard Gospel Music charts.

Hawkins has collaborated with Michael Bolton, Kenny Lattimore, Darlene Love, Earth, Wind & Fire, and Jennifer Holliday.

== Personal life ==
Hawkins was married to Tramaine Hawkins from 1971 until their divorce in 1994. They had two children.

=== Death ===
On July 11, 2010, Walter Hawkins died of pancreatic cancer at the age of 61 in his house in Ripon, California.

== Discography ==
=== Albums ===
- 1972: Selah (Fantasy)
- 1972: Do Your Best (solo album)
- 1975: Love Alive – Love Center Choir (Light)
- 1977: Jesus Christ Is the Way – The Hawkins Family (Light)
- 1978: Love Alive II – with the Love Center Choir (Light)
- 1980: The Hawkins Family (Light)
- 1982: Gospel (Savoy)
- 1982: I Feel Like Singing (Light)
- 1984: Love Alive III (Light)
- 1988: Special Gift with the Family (Birthright)
- 1989: Love Alive Reunion (Light)
- 1990: Love Alive IV – (Malaco)
- 1996: New Dawning – with the Hawkins Family (Bellmark)
- 1998: Love Alive, Vol. 5: 25th Anniversary Reunion – Love Center Choir (Interscope)
- 2000: Take Courage – Hawkins Family (Bellmark)
- 2005: A Song in My Heart (solo) (Coda/Red-Sony)

=== Compilation albums ===
- 1990: Only The Best (Light)
- 1995: Light Years (Light)
- 1995: The Hawkins Family Collection (Platinum)
- 2002: The Best of Love Alive (Light)
- 2002: Legends of Gospel (Light)
- 2002: Mega 3 Collection: Love Alive (Light)
- 2005: The Very Best of Walter Hawkins and the Hawkins Family (Artemis Gospel)

=== Appearances on other albums ===
- 1973: Fire Up – Merl Saunders
- 1975: This Moment – Danniebelle
- 1976: David Soul – David Soul
- 1980: The Lord's Prayer – Various artists; duet with Tramaine Hawkins on "Thy Kingdom Come" (Light)
- 1982: Imagine Heaven – The Edwin Hawkins Singers
- 1982: This Is Love – Patrick Henderson (keyboards)
- 1983: I'm On Your Side – Angela Bofill
- 1986: The Search Is Over – Tramaine Hawkins
- 1986: I Must Go On – Shirley Miller (producer, writer, vocals)
- 1986: Hand in Hand – The Williams Brothers (producer, keyboards)
- 1986: Just Daryl – Daryl Coley (background vocals, keyboards)
- 1986: Frantic Romantic – Jermaine Stewart (background vocals)
- 1987: The Hunger – Michael Bolton (background vocals)
- 1987: Touch the World – Earth, Wind & Fire
- 1987: Baby Sis – Lynette Hawkins Stephens (producer, writer, vocals)
- 1990: Face to Face – Edwin Hawkins
- 1990: Live – Tramaine Hawkins (producer, choir director, keyboards)
- 1991: Gospel Music Workshop of America
- 1991: Gentlemen of Gospel, Vol. 2
- 1992: A Salute to The Caravans – Various artists (performer on "Where Is Your Faith in God")
- 1993: It Remains to Be Seen – The Mississippi Mass Choir (producer)
- 1993: Hold on Old Soldier – The Mississippi Mass Choir (producer, writer, singer)
- 1994: Choirs En Masse – Various artists (performer, producer)
- 1994: Job – Bay Area Mass Choir
- 1995: On & On – Jennifer Holliday (producer, background vocals, piano)
- 1996: Music in Me – Larry Coleman (producer)
- 1996: "I'll See You In The Rapture" Mississippi Mass Choir
- 1996: Be Encouraged – Los Angeles Chapter of the G.M.W.A.
- 1997: Jesus Loves Me – The Western Michigan Mass Choir
- 1997: Leaning on Jesus – Cogic International Mass Choir
- 1997: Live Gospel Experience, Vol. 3 – Various artists
- 1997: Live Gospel Experience, Vol. 4 – Various artists
- 1997: Keepers – Merl Saunders & Friends (background vocals)
- 1998: Love Is the Only Way – Edwin Hawkins
- 1998: I Get Lifted – Kelli Williams (producer, keyboards)
- 1998: Unconditional Love – Darlene Love
- 1999: World Class Gospel Experience, Vol. 1 – Various artists
- 2002: Go Get Your Life Back – Donald Lawrence
- 2005: Get Thee Behind Me – Sacramento Metropolitan GMWA
- 2005: Journey-Live in NY – Richard Smallwood
- 2006: Praise & Worship – Daryl Coley (producer)
- 2006: Finale Act I, Finale Act II & The Grand Finale by Donald Lawrence and The Tri-City Singers
- 2008: The Sound – Mary Mary
- 2010: The Gospel Music Celebration: Tribute to Bishop G.E. Patterson – Various artists ("What is This")
- 2010: The Gospel Music Celebration, Pt. 2: Tribute To Bishop G.E. Patterson – Various artists ("I Love You, Lord")

=== Video ===
- 1982: Gospel
- 1983: Oh Happy Day
- 1991: Love Alive, Vol. 4 (Malaco)
- 1998: Walter Hawkins & The Hawkins Family (Monterey Video)
- 1998: Love Alive, Vol. 5: 25th Anniversary Reunion, Vol. 1 (Interscope)
- 1999: Love Alive, Vol. 5: 25th Anniversary Reunion, Vol. 2 (Interscope)
- 2006: Song in My Heart (Coda)

== Awards ==
=== Grammy Awards ===
Hawkins won one Grammy out of eight nominations.

Year	Category	Nominated work	Result
1978	Best Soul Gospel Performance, Contemporary	"Love Alive II (Album)"	Nominated
1979	Best Soul Gospel Performance, Contemporary	Push For Excellence (Album)	Nominated
1980	Best Gospel Performance, Contemporary Or Inspirational	"The Lord's Prayer"	Won
1981	Best Soul Gospel Performance, Contemporary	Walter Hawkins: The Hawkins Family (Album)	Nominated
1988	Best Soul Gospel Performance, Male	Special Gift (Track)	Nominated
1990	Best Gospel Album by a Choir Or Chorus	Love Alive IV (Album)	Nominated
1996	Best Traditional Soul Gospel Album	"New Dawning (Album)"	Nominated
1998	Best Gospel Choir Or Chorus Album	Love Alive V – 25th Anniversary Reunion (Album)	Nominated

=== Dove and Stellar awards ===
Hawkins won three Gospel Music Association Dove Awards:

- 1980: Soul Gospel Album of the Year for Love Alive II; Walter Hawkins and the Love Center Choir
- 1982: Contemporary Gospel Album of the Year for The Hawkins Family Live
- 1991: Traditional Song of the Year for "The Potter's House" (co-songwriter)

He won two Stellar Awards:

- 2006: Traditional Male Vocalist of the Year
- 2006: Traditional CD of the Year for A Song in My Heart
