= Oregon Symphony discography =

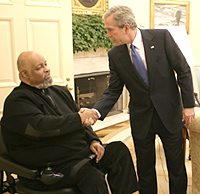
- James DePreist, Oregon Symphony conductor from 1980 to 2003, being congratulated by President George W. Bush after receiving the National Medal of Arts in 2005; the Symphony released 17 albums during DePreist's tenure.
- Studio albums: 19
- Compilation albums: 1

The Oregon Symphony, based in Portland, Oregon, was founded in 1896 as the Portland Symphony Society; it is the sixth oldest orchestra in the United States (and the oldest in the Western United States), and claims to be one of the largest arts organizations in the Pacific Northwest. The symphony has released nineteen studio albums and one compilation album through the record labels Delos, Koch International Classics, Albany and PentaTone Classics. The first recording, Bravura (1987), was released under the artistic leadership of James DePreist. It received favorable reviews and was the first of three released through Delos. The next two recordings were collections of compositions by Sergei Rachmaninoff (The Sea and the Gulls, 1987) and Pyotr Ilyich Tchaikovsky (Tchaikovsky: 1812 Overture; The Tempest; Hamlet, 1989).

In 1992, the orchestra released its first record through Koch, with works by Gian Carlo Menotti, Ronald Lo Presti and Norman Dello Joio. DePreist and the symphony then issued two special edition albums not available commercially: Romeo and Juliet (1992), featuring Tchaikovsky's Fantasy Overture Romeo and Juliet, and Roman Festivals (1993), a re-issue of the performance of Respighi's Feste Romane from Bravura. On Martin Luther King, Jr. Day in 1995, the symphony released its second album through Koch, with works by Joseph Schwantner and Nicolas Flagello; more than 30 United States radio stations broadcast Schwantner's piece on the holiday to commemorate the civil rights leader. The album reached a peak position of number three on Billboard's Classical Albums chart and remains the symphony's best-selling album to date. Later that year, to commemorate its centenary, the symphony released its first compilation album, Centennial Collection, which contained material from previously released recordings. Erich Wolfgang Korngold: The Sea Hawk; Symphony in F-Sharp followed in 1998.

During DePreist's final five years as music director, the symphony was able to fund two recording sessions per year due to a $1 million bequest that established the Gretchen Brooks Recording Fund. The first two resulting albums were Stravinsky: The Rite of Spring; The Firebird Suite (2001) and Respighi's Rome (2001), which completed the "Roman Triptych" of Respighi started by Bravura and continued with Roman Festivals. The remaining albums released through Delos included American Contrasts (2003), Shostakovich: Symphony No. 11 "The Year 1905" (2003), Sibelius: Symphony No. 2; Symphony No. 7 (2004), Walton: Suite from Henry V; Cello Concerto; Violin and Piano Sonata; Bernard Rands: Tre Canzoni Senza Parole (2005) and Tragic Lovers (2008). Each of these featured DePreist as conductor, though some were released following his departure from the Oregon Symphony in April 2003. In 2003, the orchestra also released Orchestral Works by Tomas Svoboda, its first album through Albany. The recording of Tomáš Svoboda's Concerto for Marimba and Orchestra, featuring percussionist Niel DePonte, received a Grammy Award nomination for Best Instrumental Soloist Performance with Orchestra. The orchestra released 17 albums conducted by DePreist.

In 2011, the symphony released Music for a Time of War, which debuted and peaked at number 31 on Billboard's Classical Albums chart and received Grammy Award nominations for Best Orchestral Performance and Best Engineered Album, Classical. This England and Spirit of the American Range followed in 2012 and 2015, respectively. These recordings marked the first three of four albums to be produced by the symphony and the Dutch record label PentaTone by the end of the 2014–15 season, all under the artistic leadership of current conductor Carlos Kalmar.

== Studio albums ==
List of studio albums, with featured conductors and works
Title	Album details	Conductor	Works	Ref(s)
Bravura	Released: 1987; Label: Delos; Format: CD	James DePreist	Ottorino Respighi – Feste Romane (Roman Festivals), P. 157; Richard Strauss – Don Juan, Op. 20; Witold Lutosławski – Concerto for Orchestra	
The Sea and the Gulls	Released: 1987; Label: Delos; Format: CD	James DePreist	Sergei Rachmaninoff – La Mer et les Mouettes (The Sea and the Gulls); Rachmaninoff – Symphony No. 2; Rachmaninoff – "Vocalise", Op. 34 No. 14	
Tchaikovsky: 1812 Overture; The Tempest; Hamlet	Released: 1989; Label: Delos; Format: CD	James DePreist	Pyotr Ilyich Tchaikovsky – The Tempest, Op. 18; Tchaikovsky – Hamlet, Op. 67; Tchaikovsky – 1812 Overture, Op. 49	
Menotti: Apocalypse (World Premiere Recording); Dello Joio: Meditations on Ecclesiastes	Released: 1992; Label: Koch International Classics; Format: CD	James DePreist	Gian Carlo Menotti – Apocalypse; Ronald Lo Presti – The Masks; Norman Dello Joio – Meditations on Ecclesiastes	
Romeo and Juliet	Released: 1992; Format: CD	James DePreist	Pyotr Ilyich Tchaikovsky – Romeo and Juliet	
Roman Festivals	Released: 1993; Format: CD	James DePreist	Ottorino Respighi – Feste Romane (Roman Festivals), P. 157	
Joseph Schwantner: New Morning for the World; Nicolas Flagello: The Passion of Martin Luther King	Released: January 16, 1995; Label: Koch International Classics; Format: CD	James DePreist	Joseph Schwantner – New Morning for the World; Nicolas Flagello – The Passion of Martin Luther King	
Erich Wolfgang Korngold: The Sea Hawk; Symphony in F-Sharp	Released: 1998; Label: Delos; Format: CD	James DePreist	Erich Wolfgang Korngold – Suite from The Sea Hawk; Korngold – Symphony in F-sharp	
Stravinsky: The Rite of Spring; The Firebird Suite	Released: 2001; Label: Delos; Format: CD	James DePreist	Igor Stravinsky – The Rite of Spring; Stravinsky – The Firebird Suite ("Concert suite for orchestra No. 2")	
Respighi's Rome	Released: 2001; Label: Delos; Format: CD	James DePreist	Ottorino Respighi – Fountains of Rome (Fontane di Roma), P. 106; Respighi – Pines of Rome (Pini di Roma), P. 141; Respighi – Roman Festivals (Feste romane), P. 157	
American Contrasts	Released: 2003; Label: Delos; Format: CD	James DePreist	Benjamin Lees – Passacaglia for Orchestra; Vincent Persichetti – Symphony No. 4, Op. 51; Michael Daugherty – "Sundown on South Street"; Daugherty – "Hell's Angels"	
Orchestral Works by Tomas Svoboda	Released: July 2003; Label: Albany Records; Format: CD	James DePreist	Tomáš Svoboda – Overture of the Season, Op. 89; Svoboda – Concerto for Marimba and Orchestra, Op. 148; Svoboda – Symphony No. 1 (of Nature), Op. 20	
Shostakovich: Symphony No. 11 "The Year 1905"	Released: 2003; Label: Delos; Format: CD	James DePreist	Dmitri Shostakovich – Symphony No. 11 ("The Palace Square", "The 9th of January", "In Memoriam", "The Tocsin")	
Sibelius: Symphony No. 2; Symphony No. 7	Released: 2004; Label: Delos; Format: CD	James DePreist	Jean Sibelius – Symphony No. 7; Sibelius – Symphony No. 2	
Walton: Suite from Henry V; Cello Concerto; Violin and Piano Sonata; Bernard Rands: Tre Canzoni Senza Parole	Released: 2005; Label: Delos; Format: CD	James DePreist	William Walton – Suite from Henry V; Walton – Concerto for Violoncello and Orchestra; Bernard Rands – Tre Canzoni Senza Parole (Three Songs Without Words); Walton – Sonata for Violin and Piano	
Tragic Lovers	Released: September 30, 2008; Label: Delos; Format: CD	James DePreist	Richard Wagner – Prelude and "Liebestod" from Tristan and Isolde; Hector Berlioz – "Love Scene" from Roméo et Juliette, Op. 17; Pyotr Ilyich Tchaikovsky – Romeo and Juliet	
Music for a Time of War	Released: October 25, 2011; Label: PentaTone Classics; Format: CD	Carlos Kalmar	Charles Ives – The Unanswered Question; John Adams – The Wound-Dresser; Benjamin Britten – Sinfonia da Requiem; Ralph Vaughan Williams – Symphony No. 4	
This England	Released: November 13, 2012; Label: PentaTone Classics; Format: CD	Carlos Kalmar	Edward Elgar – Cockaigne (In London Town), Op. 40; Ralph Vaughan Williams – Symphony No. 5; Benjamin Britten – Four Sea Interludes and Passacaglia from Peter Grimes, Op. 33a and b	
Spirit of the American Range	Released: February 10, 2015; Label: Pentatone; Format: CD	Carlos Kalmar	Walter Piston – "Suite from The Incredible Flutist"; George Antheil – "A Jazz Symphony"; Aaron Copland – Symphony No. 3	
Aspects of America	Released: September 7, 2018; Label: Pentatone; Format: CD	Carlos Kalmar	Sean Shepherd – "Magiya"; Sebastian Currier – "Microsymph"; Christopher Rouse – "Supplica"; Kenji Bunch – Aspects of an Elephant; Samuel Barber – Souvenirs, Opus 28	
Gospel Christmas	Released: November 2, 2018; Label: Pentatone; Format: CD	Charles Floyd	DeMarcus Williams – "King of Kings"; Bill Winston – "Sacrifice of Praise"; Milton Biggham – "Jesus Is Born"; Terry Davis – "And His Name Shall Be Called"; Michael McElroy / Joseph Joubert / Buryl Red – "You Oughta Know"; Norman Hutchins – "Emmanuel"; Gary Hemenway / Charles Floyd – "Jesus Savior, Come as a Child"; James Fortune (arr. Ayron Lewis) – "Got Tell It – Wonderful Child"; Joseph Pace II – "Zion Rejoice"; George Frideric Handel – "Hallelujah"; Various – "Christmas Worship Medley"; George Frideric Handel – "Joy to the World"	

== Compilation albums ==
List of compilation albums, with featured conductors and works
Title	Album details	Conductor	Works	Ref(s)
Centennial Collection	Released: 1995; Format: CD	James DePreist	Richard Strauss – Don Juan, Op. 20; Witold Lutosławski – Concerto for Orchestra; Sergei Rachmaninoff – Symphony No. 2; Pyotr Ilyich Tchaikovsky – Romeo and Juliet; Gian Carlo Menotti – Apocalypse	
