= Spirit of the American Range =

2015 album by the Oregon Symphony

Studio album by Oregon Symphony
- Released: February 10, 2015
- Recorded: April 13–15, 20–22, 2013; January 5, 2014
- Venue: Arlene Schnitzer Concert Hall, Portland, Oregon
- Genre: Classical
- Length: 65:21
- Label: Pentatone
- Producer: Blanton Alspaugh

Oregon Symphony chronology
This England (2012)	Spirit of the American Range (2015)	Haydn Symphonies (2017)

Spirit of the American Range is a classical music album by the Oregon Symphony under the artistic direction of Carlos Kalmar, released by the Dutch record label Pentatone on February 10, 2015. The album was recorded at the Arlene Schnitzer Concert Hall in Portland, Oregon in April 2013 and January 2014. It contains works by three American 20th-century composers: Walter Piston's ballet suite from The Incredible Flutist, George Antheil's "A Jazz Symphony", and Aaron Copland's Symphony No. 3. The recording was the third by the orchestra under Kalmar's leadership, following the highly successful Music for a Time of War (2011) and This England (2012). Spirit of the American Range received a Grammy Award nomination for Best Orchestral Performance, and its producer, Blanton Alspaugh, was nominated for Producer of the Year, Classical.

== Background and composition ==
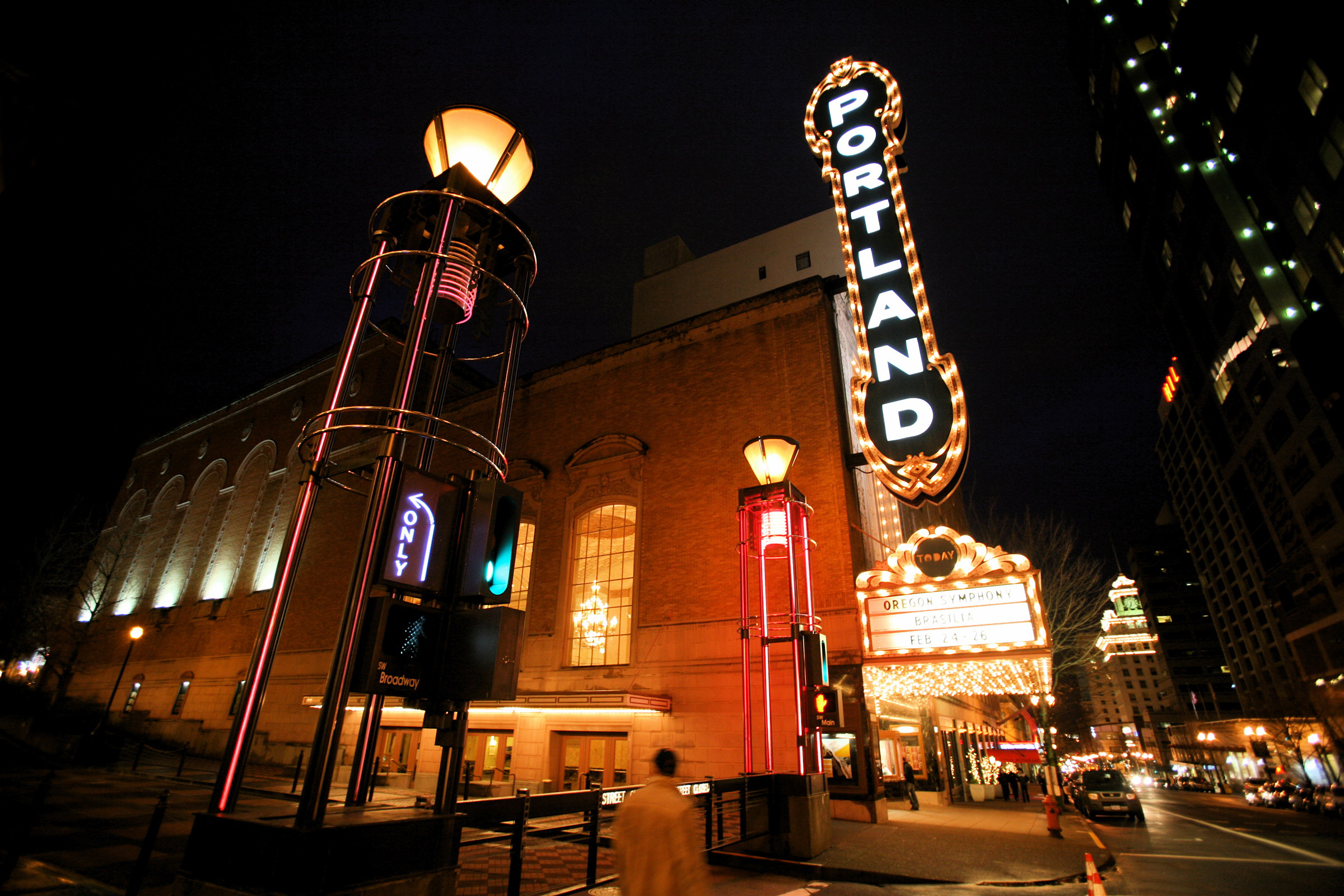
The album was recorded at the Arlene Schnitzer Concert Hall.

Spirit of the American Range was released by the Dutch record label Pentatone in February 2015, following a pre-release by the Oregon Symphony on January 8. The album contains compositions by three 20th-century American composers: the ballet suite from The Incredible Flutist by Walter Piston, "A Jazz Symphony" by George Antheil, and Symphony No. 3 by Aaron Copland. These works were recorded live at the Arlene Schnitzer Concert Hall in Portland, Oregon.

The Piston suite was recorded on April 13–15, 2013, and "A Jazz Symphony" was recorded on April 20–22, 2013, and Copland's symphony was recorded on January 5, 2014. The album was the third recording by the orchestra during Carlos Kalmar's tenure, following the highly successful Music for a Time of War (2011) and This England (2012). Like these albums, Spirit of the American Range was recorded in hybrid multichannel (surround sound) Super Audio CD format by Soundmirror recording engineers John Newton and Blanton Alspaugh.

Mark Donahue served as the mixing and mastering engineer. The album's liner notes are credited to Elizabeth Schwartz with German translations by Franz Steiger; its cover photo was taken by Martha Warrington, and it features designs by Freshu. Angelina Jambrekovic served as a product manager.

Job Maarse, artistic director of Pentatone, said of the album's origins:

From day one the cooperation between Pentatone and the Oregon Symphony and its Music Director Carlos Kalmar has been something magical. The quality of the orchestra and the program ideas of Carlos Kalmar attracted the attention of a large group of music lovers in and outside the U.S. During a pleasant meeting at the Chicago airport almost two years ago the idea for this new album was discussed. I believe all at the table liked it and now everybody can hear how these three pieces, although by composers with different styles, fit perfectly in one program. And of course the Copland Symphony is one of the best pieces ever written by an American composer.

Kalmar said of the recording, "It is a great pleasure to share these important American works for which I have the greatest fondness and appreciation. They aren't widely performed and certainly deserve to be enjoyed by a wider public." Spirit of the American Range was funded in part by the James DePreist Fund for Broadcast and Recording.

=== Works ===
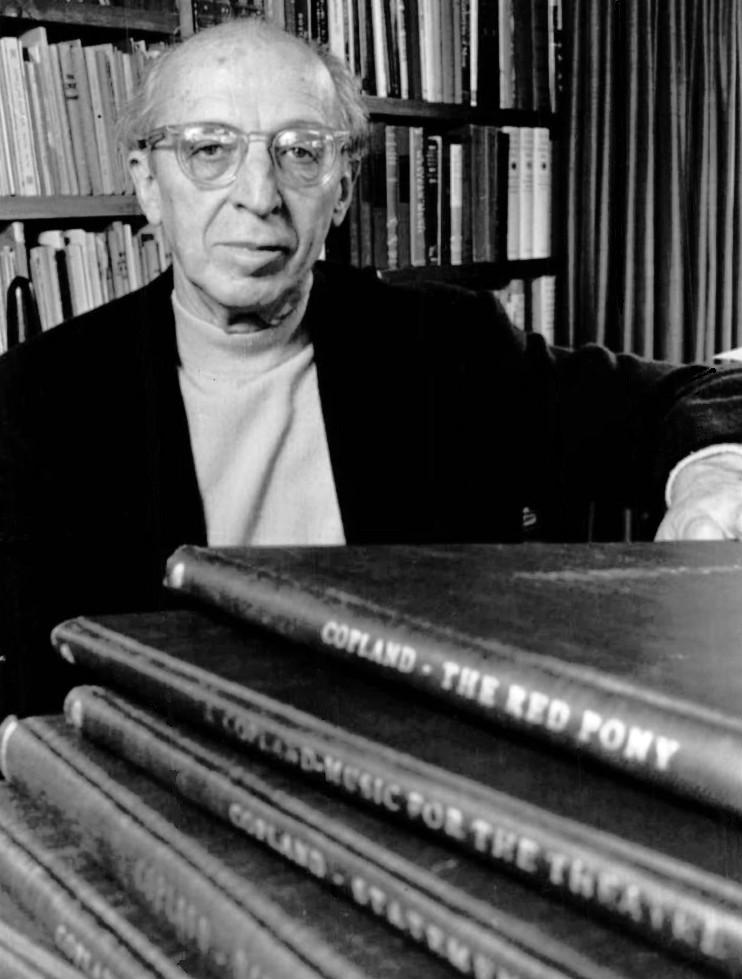
The recording features composer Aaron Copland's Symphony No. 3.

The Incredible Flutist (1938), Piston's only composition for the stage, received its premiere at Symphony Hall on May 30, 1938, by the Boston Pops under Arthur Fiedler. The performance featured work by dancer-choreographer Hans Wiener and his ballet company. The ballet is about residents of a small village becoming enchanted by a flutist affiliated with a traveling circus.

Antheil's "A Jazz Symphony" was composed in 1925 and premiered at Carnegie Hall on April 10, 1927. It is written for two oboes, two clarinets, one soprano saxophone, one alto saxophone, one tenor saxophone, three trumpets, three trombones, tuba, percussion, a drum set, two pianos, two banjos (one doubling guitar), strings, and solo piano. According to Antheil, the work is: "one of the very first symphonic expressions which attempted to synthesize American jazz as a legitimate symphonic expression".

Copland's third symphony was composed between 1944 and September 1946, and was premiered by Serge Koussevitzky conducting the Boston Symphony Orchestra on October 18, 1946. It is written for three flutes, two piccolos, three oboes and English horn, two clarinets, E-flat clarinet, bass clarinet, two bassoons and contrabassoon, four horns, four trumpets, three trombones and tuba, timpani, two harps, celesta, piano, strings, and a variety of percussion instruments, including bass drum, tam-tam, cymbals, xylophone, glockenspiel, tenor drum, wood block, snare drum, triangle, slapstick, ratchet, anvil, claves, and tubular bells. Copland said the work would "reflect the euphoric spirit of the country at the time".

== Broadcasts and reception ==
KQAC (89.9 FM, "All Classical Portland") broadcast the album on January 8, 2015, and made it available to stream on its website. The station offered the album as a thank-you gift to donors during a fundraising campaign.

Classical Voice North America's Paul E. Robinson said the album's contents were unrelated to its title, and had "nothing whatever to do with the early days of the American West", but complimented the orchestra's performances. He praised the "excellent" flute soloist in The Incredible Flutist, called the performance of Copland's symphony "more careful than inspired", and noted the "vast dynamic range" created by the label's sound technology.

Peter Dickinson of Gramophone compared Kalmar's interpretation of Symphony No. 3 to other available recordings: "Kalmar and the Oregon Symphony are impressive and create a challenge to the established choices. Kalmar is a minute shorter than Bernstein in both the opening movement and fanfare finale. Overall his interpretation is similar to Bernstein's, and the orchestra's expert handling of the work suggests that they should record more."

Furthermore, he wrote, "Engineering is excellent but individual tracks for the Piston would have been a help." Anthony Tommasini, music critic for The New York Times, called the recording "exciting" and said the Piston piece received a "supple, colorful performance". He complimented "A Jazz Symphony", which he said "emerges here as a savvy, audacious score", and ended his review with: "Best of all is an urgent, superbly played account of Copland's Third Symphony." The Oregonian's David Stabler praised the Oregon Symphony for recording the lesser-known works by Piston and Antheil.

The album received a Grammy Award nomination for Best Orchestral Performance at the 58th Annual Grammy Awards, marking the third for Kalmar and the orchestra. In addition, Alspaugh was nominated for Producer of the Year, Classical. Kalmer said of the recognition, "I think this is a confirmation of the excellent quality that the orchestra is offering. In my mind, it's very important that we get nominated. Whether we get the Grammy or not has so many other components." Christine Whiteside, executive director of the Oregon Symphony Association in Salem, said, "It validates the quality of the Oregon Symphony, and what a great honor it is to have a Grammy-nominated orchestra play in Salem."

== Track listing ==
1. "Suite from The Incredible Flutist"^{1} (Walter Piston) – 17:12
2. "A Jazz Symphony" (George Antheil) – 7:07

Symphony No. 3 (Aaron Copland)

3. "Molto Moderato, with simple expression'" – 9:55
4. "Allegro molto" – 7:55
5. "Andantino quasi allegretto" – 10:13
6. "Motto deliberato (Fanfare) – Allegro risoluto" – 12:55

Track listing adapted from the album's liner notes.

^{^Note 1} Includes: Introduction; Siesta Hours in the Marketplace and Entrance of the Vendors; Dance of the Vendors; Entrance of the Customers, Tango of the Four Daughters, Arrival of Circus and Circus March; Solo of the Flutist; Minuet: Dance of the Widow and Merchant; Spanish Waltz; Eight O'Clock Strikes; Siciliano: Dance of the Flutist and the Merchant's Daughter; Polka; Finale.

== Personnel ==
- Blanton Alspaugh – recording engineer
- Mark Donahue – mixing and mastering engineer
- freshu – design
- Angelina Jambrekovic – product manager
- Carlos Kalmar – conductor
- John Newton – recording engineer
- Elizabeth Schwartz – liner notes
- Franz Steiger – German translation (liner notes)
- Martha Warrington – cover photography

=== Orchestra roster ===
- violin – Sarah Kwak, Peter Frajola, Maria Stanley Smith, Erin Furbee, Chien Tan, Inés Voglar Belgique, Fumino Ando, Keiko Araki, Clarisse Atcherson, Ron Blessinger, Lily Burton*, Ruby Chen, Emily Cole, Julie Coleman, Dolores D'Aigle, Eileen Deiss, Lisbeth Dreier*, Jonathan Dubay, Gregory Ewer, Daniel Ge Feng, Lynne Finch, Kathryn Gray, Shin-young Kwon, Ryan Lee, Vali Phillips, Deborah Singer, Raffaela Wahby*
- viola – Joël Belgique, Charles Noble, Jennifer Arnold, Silu Fei, Leah Ilem, Brian Quincey, Viorel Russo, Stephen Price, Martha Warrington, Kenneth Freed^, Jin Ningning^
- cello – Nancy Ives, Marilyn de Oliveira, Kenneth Finch, Trevor Fitzpatrick, Gayle Budd O'Grady, Timothy Scott, David Socolofsky, Heather Blackburn^
- bass – Frank Diliberto, Edward Botsford**, Jeffrey Johnson, Kate Munagian*, Jason Schooler, Brian Johnson, David Parmeter^
- flute – Jessica Sindell, Alicia DiDonato Paulsen, Zachariah Galatis, Molly Barth^, Sarah Tiedemann^
- piccolo – Zachariah Galatis
- oboe – Martin Hebert, Karen Wagner, Kyle Mustain
- English horn – Kyle Mustain
- clarinet – Yoshinori Nakao, Todd Kuhns, Mark Dubac, Carol Robe^
- bass clarinet – Todd Kuhns
- bassoon – Carin Miller Packwood, Evan Kuhlmann**, Adam Trussell
- contrabassoon – Evan Kuhlmann, Steve Vaccchi^
- horn – John Cox, Joseph Berger, Graham Kingsbury, Mary Grant, Alicia Waite
- trumpet – Jeffrey Work, David Bamonte, Micah Wilkinson, Charles Butler^, Steve Conrow^
- trombone – Aaron LaVere, Robert Taylor, Charles Reneau
- bass trombone – Charles Reneau
- tuba – JáTtik Clark
- timpani – Jonathan Greeney
- percussion – Niel DePonte, Sergio Carreno, Michael Roberts, Brian Gardiner^, Gordon Rencher^, Chris Whyte^
- harp – Jennifer Craig, Jenny Lindner^
- keyboard – Yoko Greeney^, Carol Rich^

Credits adapted from the album's liner notes.

"*" denotes acting musicians; "**" denotes principals on Copland; "^" denotes guest musicians.

== See also ==
- 2015 in American music
- 2015 in classical music
- List of compositions by Aaron Copland
