= This England (album) =

2012 album by the Oregon Symphony

Studio album by Oregon Symphony
- Released: November 13, 2012
- Recorded: February 18–19; May 12–14, 2012
- Venues: Arlene Schnitzer Concert Hall, Portland, Oregon
- Genre: Classical
- Length: 77:29
- Label: PentaTone Classics
- Producer: Blanton Alspaugh

Oregon Symphony chronology
Music for a Time of War (2011)	This England (2012)	Spirit of the American Range (2015)

This England is a classical music album by the Oregon Symphony under the artistic direction of Carlos Kalmar, released by Dutch record label PentaTone Classics in November 2012. The album was recorded at the Arlene Schnitzer Concert Hall in Portland, Oregon, at five performances in February and May 2012. It contains works by three English 20th-century composers: Edward Elgar's Cockaigne (In London Town), Ralph Vaughan Williams' Symphony No. 5, and "Four Sea Interludes" and "Passacaglia" from Benjamin Britten's opera Peter Grimes. The recording was the orchestra's second under Kalmar's leadership, following Music for a Time of War (2011), which also included works by Britten and Vaughan Williams. This England received positive critical reception but failed to chart.

== Background and composition ==
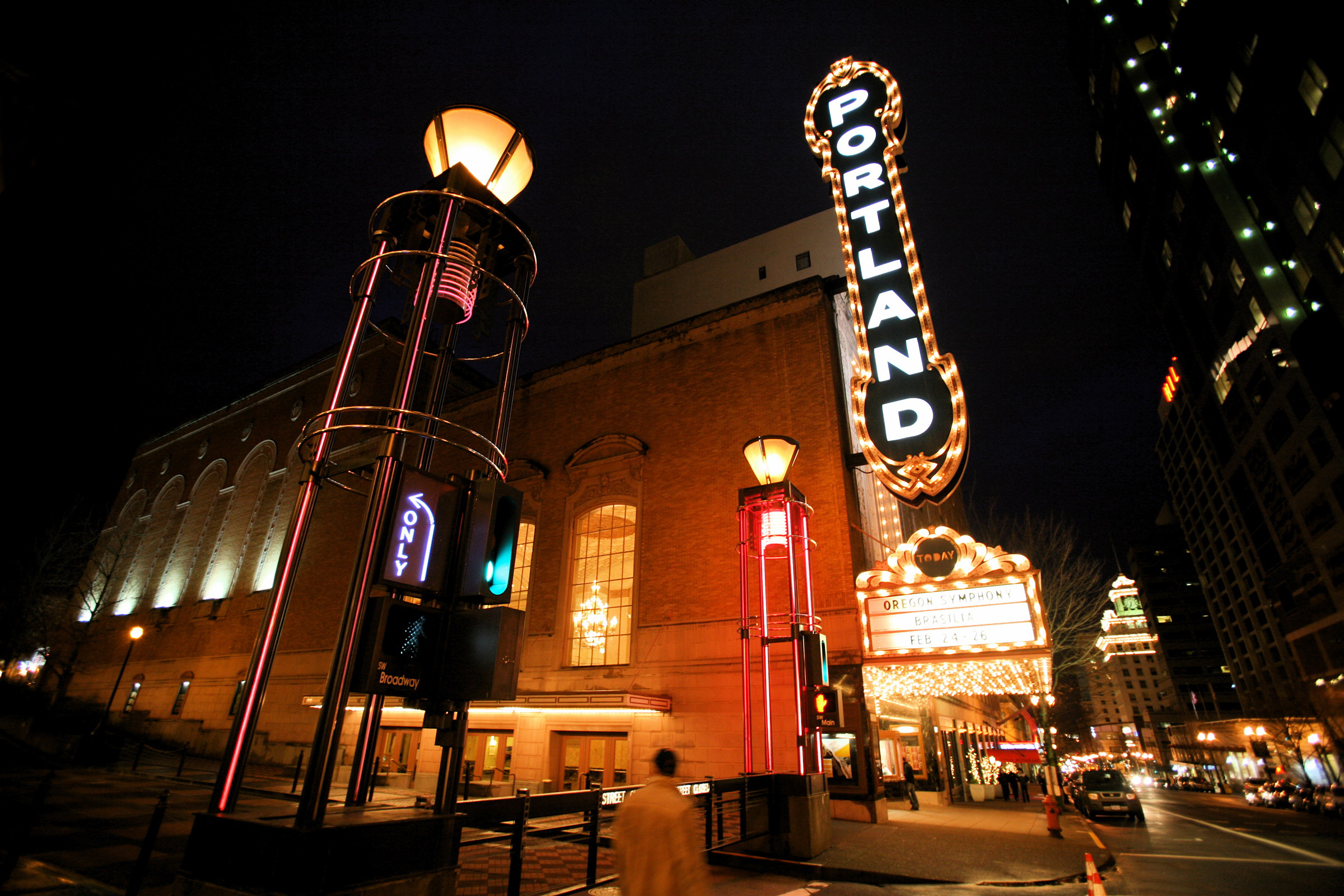
The album was recorded at the Arlene Schnitzer Concert Hall.

This England, released by Dutch record label PentaTone Classics on November 13, 2012, contains compositions by three English 20th-century composers: Cockaigne (In London Town) by Edward Elgar, Symphony No. 5 by Ralph Vaughan Williams, and "Four Sea Interludes" and "Passacaglia" from the opera Peter Grimes (1945) by Benjamin Britten. The album contains ten tracks, with works divided into separate tracks for each movement and interlude. The works were recorded live at the Arlene Schnitzer Concert Hall in Portland, Oregon, at five performances in February and May 2012. Symphony No. 5 and Cockaigne were performed February 18 and 19 as part of the program "Kahane Plays Mozart"; the works by Britten were performed May 12–14 as part of the program "Arnaldo Cohen Plays Tchaikovsky". In his review of the February 18th live performance, The Oregonian's James McQuillen noted disturbances from the audience, including coughing and the ringing of one attendant's cell phone. McQuillen suggested the disturbances could be removed from the audio by engineers if the February 19th recording was not preferable.

The album was the second recorded during Kalmar's tenure, following Music for a Time of War (2011), which also included works by Britten and Vaughan Williams and which received Grammy Award nominations for Best Orchestral Performance and Best Engineered Album, Classical. The recording was the second of four albums expected to be produced by the symphony and PentaTone by the end of the 2014–2015 season, all under Kalmar's artistic leadership. Like Music for a Time of War, This England was recorded in hybrid multichannel (surround sound) Super Audio CD format. Blanton Alspaugh served as producer. Alspaugh and John Newton were the recording engineers, and mixing and mastering was conducted by Mark Donahue. In addition to recording the performances, the Boston-based company Soundmirror edited, mixed and mastered the audio. Program notes for the recording were written by Steven Kruger. The album's cover art was designed by David McLaughlin, art director for the symphony.

The symphony celebrated the recording by hosting a CD release party in late October.

=== Works ===
"It's kind of crazy! You have a Uruguayan–born, Austrian conductor of an American orchestra performing an all-British program. But when you listen to this CD you'll understand why we are so proud of it."

— Carlos Kalmar on This England

Elgar conducted the world premiere of Cockaigne (In London Town) at a Royal Philharmonic Society concert at Queen's Hall in London in June 1901. The Oregon Symphony last performed the overture in January 1990, under Norman Leyden. The work, which is approximately 15 minutes in length, employs two flutes, piccolo, two oboes, two clarinets, two bassoons, one contrabassoon, four horns, two trumpets, two cornets, three trombones, tuba, timpani, five percussionists, strings.

Symphony No. 5 was composed during the period 1936–1943 and premiered in June 1943, with Vaughan Williams conducting the London Philharmonic Orchestra at Royal Albert Hall in London. The widely performed work evokes serenity and pastoral settings; despite being completed during World War II, Vaughan Williams originally intended the work to be an opera when he began writing it before the war. The symphony, which is approximately 41 minutes in length, contains four movements ("Preludio", "Scherzo", "Romanza" and "Passacaglia") and includes two flutes (second doubling piccolo), oboe, English horn, two clarinets, two bassoons, two horns, two trumpets, three trombones, timpani and strings. The Oregon Symphony's February 2012 performances were its first performances of Symphony No. 5.

The recording continues with Britten's "Four Sea Interludes" and "Passacaglia". The four interludes ("Dawn", "Sunday morning", "Moonlight" and "Storm") have been published separately as Opus 33a; "Passacaglia" has also been published separately as Opus 33b. Peter Grimes premiered on June 7, 1945, at the Sadler's Wells Theatre in London, conducted by Reginald Goodall. On June 13, Britten conducted the four interludes with the London Philharmonic in Cheltenham; Adrian Boult conducted "Passacaglia" with the BBC Symphony Orchestra on August 29. Prior to 2012, the Oregon Symphony's most recent performance of "Four Sea Interludes" had been in 1993 under James DePreist; the orchestra had never presented "Passacaglia". The interludes and "Passacaglia" are approximately 16 minutes and 7 minutes, respectively, and include two flutes (both doubling piccolo), two oboes, two clarinets, two bassoons, contrabassoon, four horns, three trumpets, three trombones, tuba, timpani, bass drum, bells, cymbals, gong, snare drum, tam tam, tambourine, tenor drum, xylophone, celeste, harp and strings. The percussion section added a 14-foot chime to produce bell sounds, which had to be stationed horizontally on stage.

== Reception ==
Professional ratings
Review scores
Source	Rating
Philadelphia Daily News	3.5/4 stars

This England received positive critical reception. David Patrick Stearns of Philadelphia Daily News awarded the album 3.5 out of 4 stars and, also referring to the success of Music for a Time of War, wrote that the repertoire has "perfectly wide appeal, especially in vital, muscular performances such as these". Stearns, who appreciated Kalmar's balance of technicality and the music's "exterior atmosphere", called the performances "thoughtful" and "incisive". He also noted the originality of the interludes and "Passacaglia" from Peter Grimes, claiming they "won't be mistaken for anybody else's." In his review for The Huffington Post, Brian Horay wrote that the orchestra delivered "knockout" and "beefy-yet-restrained" performances of the Peter Grimes compositions. Referring to This England and its preceding album, which featured Sinfonia da Requiem, Horay said the recordings "showcase Kalmar and his band as supreme interpreters of Benjamin Britten's amazingly colorful brand of orchestral anxiety, inviting the listener to delve ever deeper into painful, yet rewarding, symphonic ambivalence." Classical CD Review's Robert Benson called the Elgar performance "brilliant" and appreciated that "Passacaglia" was programmed before "The Storm". Benson complimented Kalmar (calling him a "conductor to watch") as well as the sound of the recording, describing it as "well-balanced orchestral sound, with a wide dynamic range". He noted the lack of audience interference with the sound and assured audiophiles that they would appreciate the quality. Steven Ritter of Audiophile Audition wrote that the symphony performed "with a brilliance and verve equal to any on record" and were "entirely attuned to the 'English' idiom". Ritter complimented Kalmar and the orchestra for the performances, saying "Who knew Oregon could sound like this? PentaTone should hold on to this bunch as long as they can, and explore as much repertory as they can handle. Great sound, performances, and production!"

Several Oregon publications included This England on their lists highlighting local products. Portland Monthly included the album on their list of "November's Best PDX Stuff", which showcases Portland's "coolest products and ideas". The Oregonian included the album on their list of "25 local gifts under $25". Oregon ArtsWatch contributor Brett Campbell recommended the album on his list of Oregon classical music "stocking stuffers". Campbell wrote that, despite the acoustic limitations of the Arlene Schnitzer Concert Hall, the live recordings "achieve admirable depth and clarity that bring out unexpected elements in both major 20th century English compositions". He also complimented Kalmar and the orchestra for their "tightly wound expressiveness" and "sharp" performances, and said their recording of Cockaigne can "proudly stand alongside other top versions by the likes of the London Symphony Orchestra".

The Portland Mercury invited local music industry professionals to list "Portland's Top Five Records of 2012"; the reviewer known as "Angry Symphony Guy" (Brian Horay) included This England at the top of his list. The CBC Radio 2 program "In Concert" designated the album as the Disc of the Week for the week of January 7, 2013. In her review, the CBC's Denise Ball said of the recording, "the sound is vivid and fresh, and the orchestra plays with remarkable depth of colour and rhythmic drive."

== Track listing ==
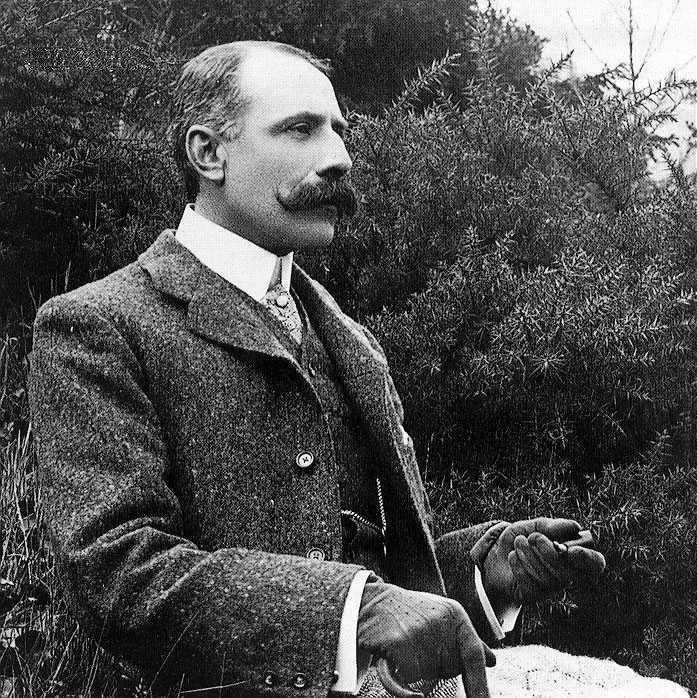
Edward Elgar

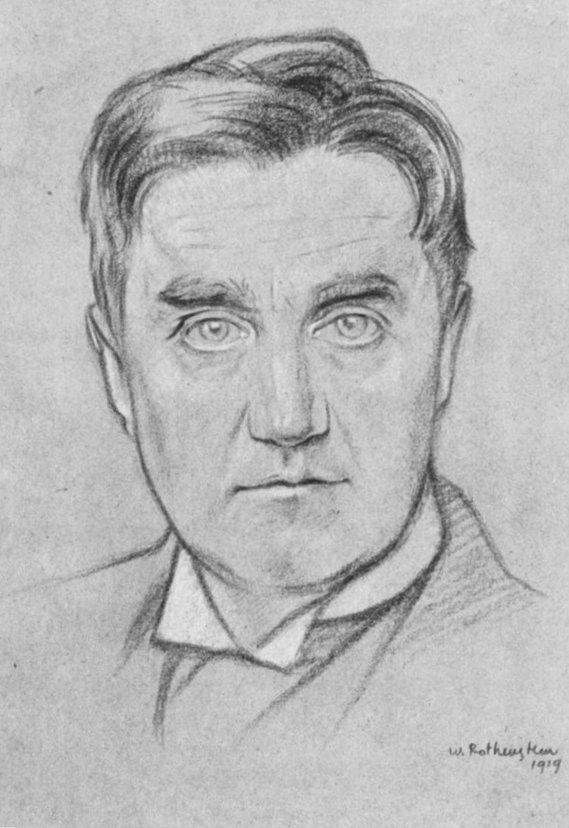
Ralph Vaughan Williams

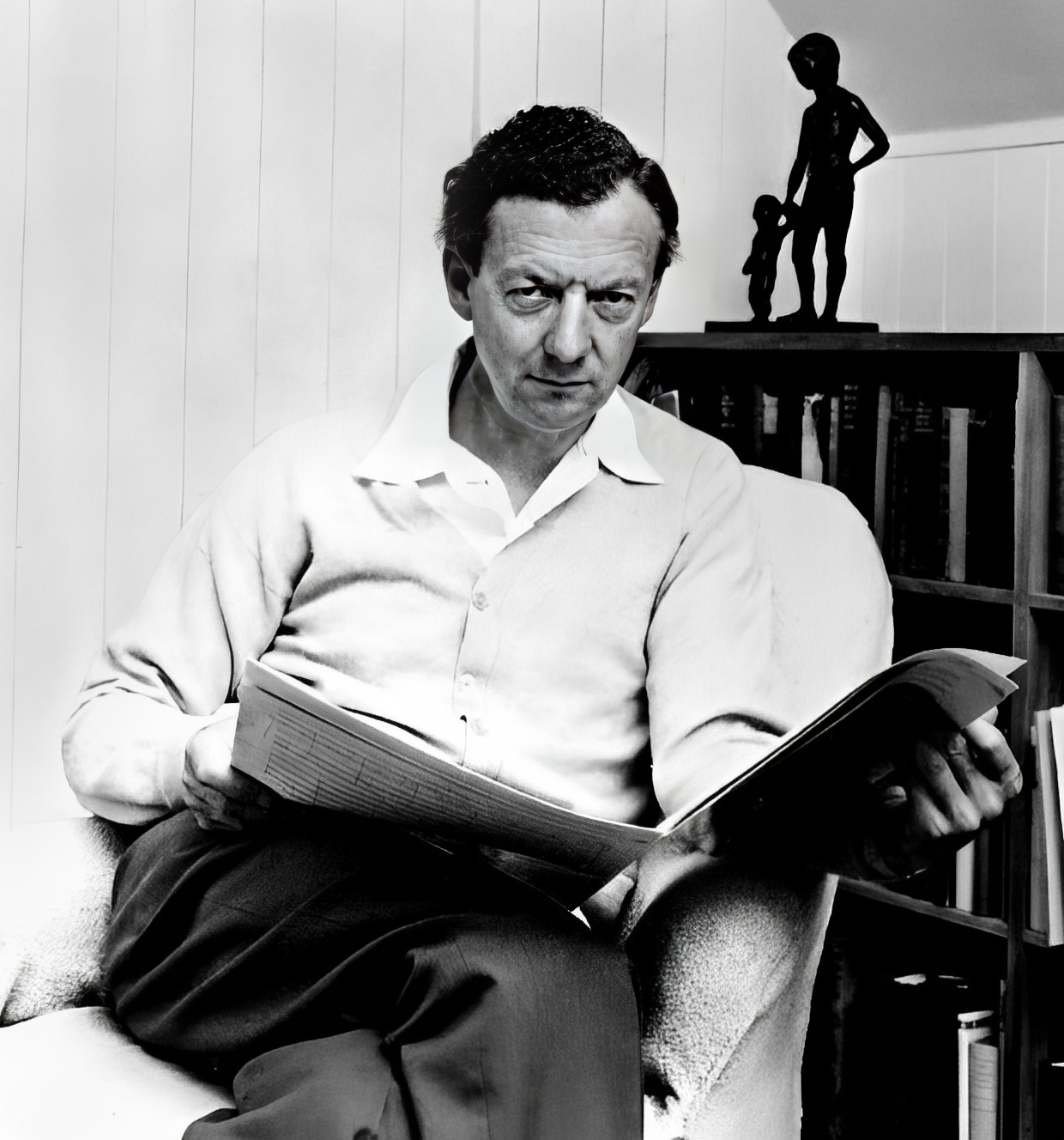
Benjamin Britten

Track listing adapted from the album's liner notes.

1. "Cockaigne (In London Town), Opus 40" (Edward Elgar) – 15:02

Symphony No. 5 in D major (Ralph Vaughan Williams)

2. "Preludio: Moderato" – 11:57
3. "Scherzo: Presto misterioso" – 5:12
4. "Romanza: Lento" – 10:56
5. "Passacaglia: Moderato" – 10:15

"Four Sea Interludes" and "Passacaglia" from Peter Grimes, Opus 33a and b (Benjamin Britten)

6. "Dawn: Lento e tranquillo" – 3:50
7. "Sunday morning: Allegro spiritoso" – 3:53
8. "Moonlight: Andante comodo e rubato"– 4:54
9. "Passacaglia" – 6:53
10. "Storm: Presto con fuoco" – 4:30

== Personnel ==
Credits adapted from AllMusic and the album's liner notes.

=== Production and design ===
- Blanton Alspaugh – producer
- Mark Donahue – mastering, mixing
- Carlos Kalmar – conductor
- Steven Kruger – liner notes
- David McLaughlin – cover art
- John Newton – engineer
- Franz Steiger – liner notes translation
- Brigitte Zwerver-Berret – liner notes translation

=== Oregon Symphony ===
- Fumino Ando – violin
- Keiko Araki – violin
- Jennifer Arnold – viola
- Clarisse Atcherson – violin**
- Lucia Atkinson – violin***
- David Bamonte – trumpet (assistant principal)
- Catherine Barrett – harp***
- Joēl Belgique – viola (principal)
- Joseph Berger – horn (associate principal)
- Ron Blessinger – violin
- Edward Botsford – bass (assistant principal)
- Lily Burton – violin*
- Sergio Carreno – percussion
- Ruby Chen – violin
- JáTtik Clark – tuba (principal)
- Emily Cole – violin
- Julie Coleman – violin
- Steve Conrow – trumpet*
- John Cox – horn (principal)
- Jennifer Craig – harp (principal)
- Dolores D'Aigle – violin (assistant principal second)
- Eileen Deiss – violin
- Marilyn de Oliveira – cello (assistant principal)
- Niel DePonte – percussion (principal)
- Frank Diliberto – bass (principal)
- Lisbeth Dreier – violin*
- Mark Dubac – clarinet, E-flat clarinet
- Jonathan Dubay – violin
- Jennifer Estrin – violin***
- Greg Ewer – violin**
- Silu Fei – viola
- Daniel Ge Feng – violin
- Kenneth Finch – cello
- Lynne Finch – violin
- Trevor Fitzpatrick – cello
- Peter Frajola – associate concertmaster, violin
- Erin Furbee – assistant concertmaster, violin
- Brian Gardiner – percussion***
- Mary Grant – horn
- Kathryn Gray – violin
- Jonathan Greeney – timpani (principal)
- Yoko Greney – keyboard***
- Kimiko Hamaguchi – violin***
- Martin Herbert – oboe (principal)
- Donald Hermanns – bass
- Leah Ilem – viola
- Nancy Ives – cello (principal)
- Brian Johnson – bass
- Jeffrey Johnson – bass
- Mary Ann Coggins Kaza – violin
- Graham Kingsbury – horn (assistant principal)
- Evan Kuhlmann – bassoon (assistant principal), contrabassoon
- Todd Kuhns – clarinet (assistant principal)
- Sarah Kwak – guest concertmaster, violin
- Shin-young Kwon – violin
- Eileen Lande – violin
- Aaron LaVere – trombone (principal)
- Ryan Lee – violin
- Matthew McKay – percussion
- Ben McDonald – trumpet***
- John McMurtery – flute,* piccolo*
- Carin Miller Packwood – bassoon (principal)
- Kyle Mustain – English horn, oboe
- Yoshinori Nakao – clarinet (principal)
- Charles Noble – viola (assistant principal)
- Gayle Budd O'Grady – cello
- Alicia DiDonato Paulsen – flute (assistant principal)
- Stephen Price – viola
- Brian Quincey – viola
- Gordon Rencher – percussion***
- Charles Reneau – bass trombone, trombone
- Viorel Russo – viola
- Jason Schooler – bass
- Timothy Scott – cello
- Jessica Sindell – flute (principal)
- Deborah Singer – violin
- David Socolofsky – cello
- Chien Tan – violin (principal second)
- Robert Taylor – trombone (assistant principal)
- Adam Trussell – bassoon
- Karen Wagner – oboe (assistant principal)
- Martha Warrington – viola
- Inés Voglar – violin
- Raffaela Wahby – violin*
- Alicia Waite – horn
- Jennifer Whittle – violin***
- Chris Whyte – percussion
- Micah Wilkinson – trumpet**
- Jeffrey Work – trumpet (principal)

=== Notes ===
- * designates acting orchestra members
- ** designates musicians on a leave of absence
- *** designates guest musicians.

== See also ==
- 2012 in American music
- 2012 in classical music
- List of compositions by Benjamin Britten
- List of compositions by Edward Elgar
