= Haydn Symphonies (album) =

Album by the Oregon Symphony

Studio album by Oregon Symphony
- Released: April 2017
- Recorded: 2013
- Venue: Arlene Schnitzer Concert Hall, Portland, Oregon
- Genre: Classical
- Label: Pentatone

Oregon Symphony chronology
Spirit of the American Range (2015)	Haydn Symphonies (2017)	Aspects of America (2018)

Haydn Symphonies is an album recorded by the Oregon Symphony under the direction of Carlos Kalmar, released by Pentatone on April 7, 2017. The albums was recorded at Portland, Oregon's Arlene Schnitzer Concert Hall in 2013, and features three symphonies by Joseph Haydn: Symphony No. 53 in D Major ("The Imperial"), Symphony No. 64 in A Major ("Tempora Mutantur"), and Symphony No. 96 in D Major ("The Miracle").

== Track listing ==
Portrait of Joseph Haydn by Thomas Hardy (1791)

Symphony No. 53 in D Major (The Imperial)

1. I. Largo maestoso; Vivace
2. II. Andante
3. III. Menuetto
4. IV. Finale: Capriccio, Moderato

Symphony No. 64 in A Major (Tempora Mutantur)

5. I. Allegro con spirito
6. II. Largo
7. III. Menuetto: Allegretto
8. IV. Finale: Presto

Symphony No. 96 in D Major (The Miracle)

9. I. Adagio; Allegro
10. II. Andante
11. III. Menuetto: Allegretto
12. IV. Finale: Vivace assai

Track listing adapted from AllMusic.

== Credits and personnel ==
- Blanton Alspaugh – Recording Producer
- Joost De Boo – Design
- Mark Donahue – Mastering, Mixing
- Simon M. Eder – Marketing, Merchandising, Production Director
- Franz Joseph Haydn – Composer
- Nancy Horowitz – Cover Image
- Carlos Kalmar – Conductor, Primary Artist
- Renaud Loranger – A&R
- Job Maarse – A&R, Executive Producer
- Leah Nash – Photography
- Veronica Neo – Merchandising
- John Newton – Engineer
- Oregon Symphony – Orchestra, Primary Artist
- Silvia Pietrosanti – Marketing
- Kate Rockett – A&R
- Elizabeth Schwartz – Liner Notes
- Max Tiel – Product Manager
- Dirk Jan Vink – Managing Director

Credits adapted from AllMusic.
