= Tragic Lovers =

2008 album by the Oregon Symphony

Studio album by Oregon Symphony
- Released: September 30, 2008
- Venue: Arlene Schnitzer Concert Hall, Portland, Oregon, U.S.
- Genre: Classical
- Length: 54:22
- Label: Delos
- Producer: Executive: Amelia S. Haygood, Carol Rosenberger; Recording: Michael Fine, Adam Stern

Oregon Symphony chronology
Walton: Suite from Henry V... (2005)	Tragic Lovers (2008)	Music for a Time of War (2011)

Tragic Lovers is a classical music album by the Oregon Symphony under the artistic direction of James DePreist, released by the record label Delos in 2008. It contains three works inspired by tragic love stories in literature: Richard Wagner's Prelude and "Liebestod" from Tristan and Isolde (1865), Hector Berlioz's "Love Scene" from Roméo et Juliette, Op. 17, and Pyotr Ilyich Tchaikovsky's Romeo and Juliet. Amelia Haygood and Carol Rosenberger served as executive producers of the album; the recording producers were Michael Fine and Adam Stern. The album's creation was financially supported by the Gretchen Brooks Recording Fund, which supported two recording sessions per year for each of DePreist's final five years as music director. Tragic Lovers was the orchestra's final recording with DePreist — who left the Oregon Symphony in April 2003 — as conductor and its final contribution to Delos's "Virtual Reality Recording" series.

Compositions from the album have been broadcast on several stations, including Public Radio Exchange, WDAV, New England Public Radio (WFCR) and Northwest Public Radio. WFCR broadcast the Tchaikovsky recording in November 2011 in recognition of DePreist's 75th birthday, and the Berlioz track in February 2013, following DePreist's death. The Classical Music Sentinel published a positive review of the album, comparing it to a three-movement symphony.

== Composition ==
Tragic Lovers, released by the record label Delos in 2008, contains three works inspired by tragic love stories in literature: Richard Wagner's Prelude and "Liebestod" from Tristan and Isolde, Hector Berlioz's "Love Scene" from Roméo et Juliette, Op. 17, and Pyotr Ilyich Tchaikovsky's Romeo and Juliet. The album contains three tracks, each one comprising a single composition and running more than fifteen minutes in length. Amelia Haygood and Carol Rosenberger served as executive producers; the recording producers were Michael Fine for the Wagner and Berlioz works and Adam Stern for the Tchaikovsky composition. The album was engineered by John Eargle, with Andrés Villalta serving as associate engineer for the Wagner and Berlioz recordings. Editing was completed by Fine (Wagner, Berlioz) and Stern (Tchaikovsky). The album marked the orchestra's final recording with DePreist as conductor and its final contribution to Delos's "Virtual Reality Recording" series.

== Broadcasts ==
All three compositions were featured on the Public Radio Exchange program "Compact Discoveries"; the Berlioz and Tchaikovsky recordings aired on an episode titled "Famous Lovers: Romeo & Juliet", and the Wagner recording was part of the following episode, titled "More Famous Lovers". In June 2009, Joe Brant featured the album on his WDAV program "New Classics", which highlights newly released classical music recordings. New England Public Radio (WFCR) aired two tracks from the album: the Tchaikovsky recording was broadcast in November 2011 in recognition of DePreist's 75th birthday, and the Berlioz track aired in November 2010 and again on February 11, 2013, following DePreist's death on February 8. The Berlioz recording also aired on the Northwest Public Radio program "Classical Music with Robin Rilette" on February 1, 2013.

== Reception ==
Jean-Yves Duperron of the Classical Music Sentinel appreciated the continuity of the subject matter and compared the album to a three-movement symphony. Referring to the opener as the first movement of this hypothetical symphony, Duperron wrote that Wagner's composition "works perfectly" by setting the tone for the album. He appreciated the Berlioz composition as a "central movement" for its more "pleasant" mood and lighter musical textures, and Tchaikovsky's work as the finale for its dramatic and "tumultuous" qualities. Duperron complimented DePreist and the orchestra for conveying the emotions depicted in each of the compositions "loud and clear", and specifically highlighted the "massive walls of sound" produced by the strings. He also commended Delos for effectively capturing the performances "with clean and powerful dynamics throughout" and concluded the review by quipping: "This perfectly coordinated collection should be part of every collection!"

== Track listing ==
1. "Prelude and 'Liebestod' from Tristan and Isolde" (Richard Wagner) – 17:14
2. "'Love Scene' from Roméo et Juliette, Op. 17" (Hector Berlioz) – 15:59
3. "Romeo and Juliet Fantasy-Overture" (Pyotr Ilyich Tchaikovsky) – 21:10

Track listing adapted from the album's liner notes.

== Personnel ==
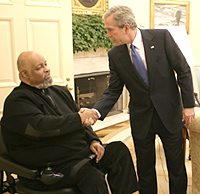
DePreist being congratulated by President George W. Bush after receiving the National Medal of Arts in 2005

- James DePreist – conductor
- John Eargle – engineer
- Mark Evans – graphic design
- Michael Fine – editor (tracks 1–2), recording producer (tracks 1–2)
- Tamra Saylor Fine – production assistant (tracks 1–2)
- Amelia S. Haygood – executive producer
- Wendy Leher – photography
- Oregon Symphony – primary artist
- Harry Pack – creative director, liner notes
- Carol Rosenberger – executive producer
- Adam Stern – editor (track 3), recording producer (track 3)
- Jim Svejda – liner notes
- Andrés Villalta – associate engineer (tracks 1–2)

Credits adapted from AllMusic and the album's liner notes.

== See also ==
- Tristan und Isolde discography
