= This England =

This England may refer to:

- This England (magazine), a magazine published in England focusing on traditional English values and customs
- This England (film), a 1941 film
- This England (album), a 2012 album by the Oregon Symphony
- This England (TV series), a 2022 miniseries
- This England: The Histories, a season of Shakespeare's history plays staged by the Royal Shakespeare Company
