= Aspects of America =

Studio album by Oregon Symphony
- Released: September 2018
- Venue: Arlene Schnitzer Concert Hall, Portland, Oregon
- Genre: Classical
- Label: Pentatone

Oregon Symphony chronology
Haydn Symphonies (2017)	Aspects of America (2018)

Aspects of America is a classical music album recorded by the Oregon Symphony under the direction of Carlos Kalmar, released by Pentatone on September 7, 2018. Featured works include: Magiya by Sean Shepherd, Microsymph by Sebastian Currier, Supplica by Christopher Rouse, Aspects of an Elephant by Kenji Bunch, and Souvenirs by Samuel Barber.

== Reception ==
Jonathan Blumhofer of The Arts Fuse said the recording "is at once superbly played, astutely programmed, and aesthetically necessary". He called "Magiya" "a spirited, blazingly colorful, seven-minute overture that brims with striking gestures and elegant musical ideas dressed up in a brilliant orchestration and never overstaying its welcome".

The album helped earn Blanton Alspaugh a Grammy Award for Producer of the Year, Classical.

== Track listing ==
1. "Magiya", Sean Shepherd - 7:14
2. "Microsymph", Sebastian Currier - 12:33
3. "Supplica", Christopher Rouse - 14:11

Aspects of an Elephant, Kenji Bunch

4. Introduction. Into Darkness - 2:18
5. Var. 1, The Elephant Is a Whip - 1:44
6. Var. 2, The Elephant Is a Spear - 1:38
7. Var. 3, The Elephant Is a Silk Cloth - 2:30
8. Var. 4, The Elephant Is a Tree - 2:02
9. Var. 5, The Elephant Is a Snake - 1:43
10. Var. 6, The Elephant Is a Throne - 1:55
11. The Argument - 1:34
12. Finale. The Creature Revealed - 6:21

Souvenirs, Op. 28 (Version for Orchestra), Samuel Barber

13. I. Waltz - 4:05
14. II. Schottische - 2:24
15. III. Pas de deux - 4:38
16. IV. Two-Step - 1:53
17. V. Hesitation-Tango - 3:52
18. VI. Galop - 2:42

Track listing adapted from the iTunes Store.
