= Emmanuel Feldman =

American cellist (born 1965)

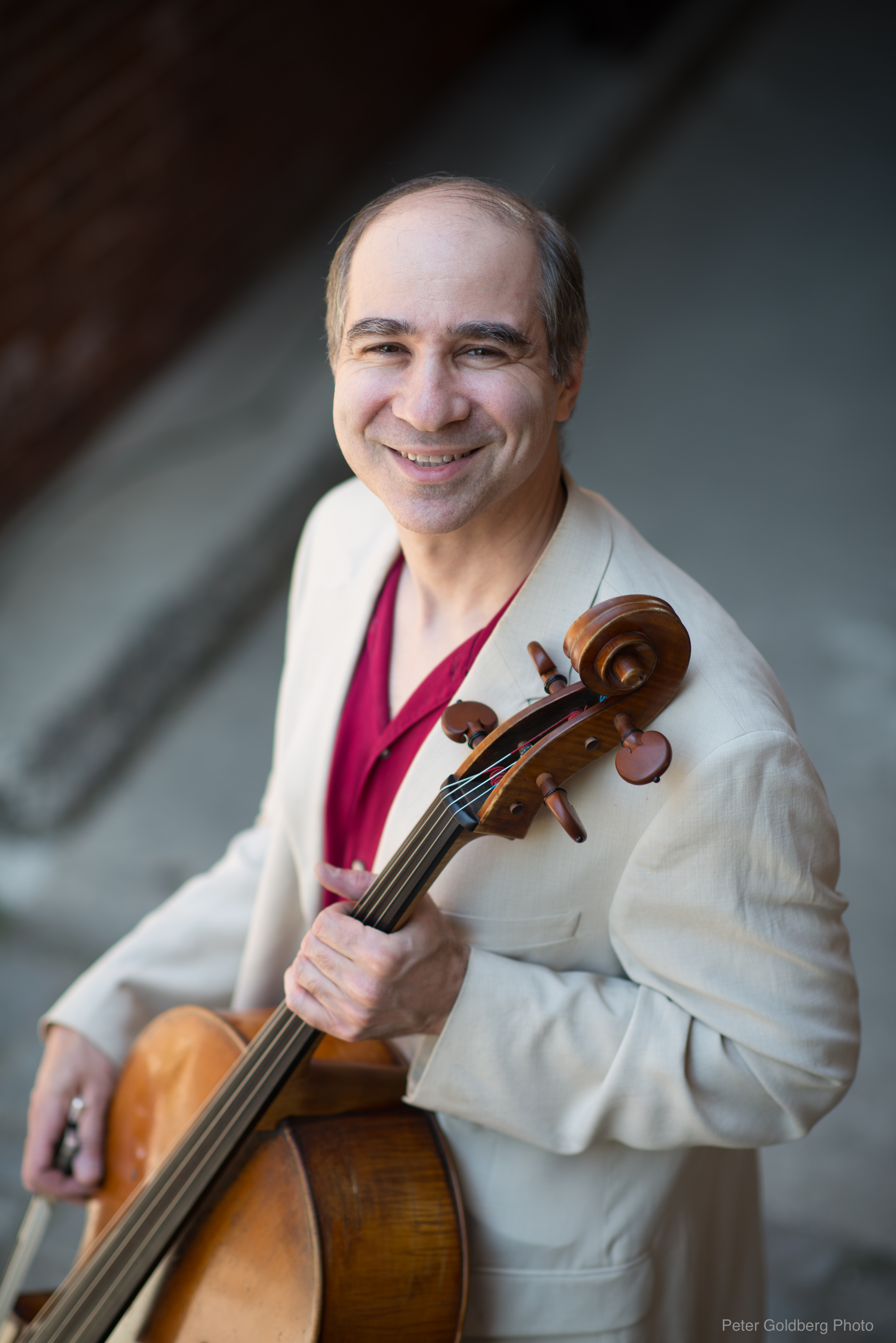

Background information
- Born: 1965 (age 60–61); New York City, New York, U.S.
- Genre: Classical
- Occupation: Musician
- Instrument: Cello
- Years active: 1986–present
- Labels: Albany; Delos; Naxos; Arsis; Navona; MMC
- Website: emmanuelfeldman.com

Emmanuel Feldman (born 1965) is an American classical cellist and teacher based in Boston, Massachusetts. He is the co-founder of the cello-double bass duo Cello e Basso, and a member of the Aurea Ensemble.

== Early life and education ==
Feldman was born and raised in New York City. He studied at the Curtis Institute of Music in Philadelphia, and at the Conservatoire de Paris.

== Career ==
As part of completing his studies in Paris, Feldman joined l'Orchestre des Prix, and was the first American ever in the orchestra. After his time in France, he moved to Boston, where he became the principal cellist in the Boston Pops Esplanade Orchestra in 1990, at the age of 23. He left in 1993 to focus on his solo career.

In 1992, Feldman and his wife Pascale Delache-Feldman formed Axiom Duo, with Feldman on cello and Delache-Feldman on double bass. As pioneers of the cello-double bass combination, they had to devise their own music by writing original pieces and transcribing music from other composers to fit their low-pitched instruments. Their self-titled debut was released in 2002. The album features works originally written for cello and bass, along with their own transcriptions of pieces by Mozart, Bartók and Handel. They later renamed the duo Cello e Basso.

In 2006, Feldman released Rider on the Plains, named after the subtitle of the first movement of Virgil Thomson's 1950 Cello Concerto, which is featured on the album. Feldman first heard of the piece in the late 1990s after speaking with Anthony Tommasini, Thomson's biographer. Feldman found it to be "an undiscovered gem of American cello repertoire." The album also includes two works by Charles Fussell, which Feldman commissioned in 2002 to record alongside Thomson's work. On the album, Feldman is joined by the New England String Ensemble and Nashville Chamber Orchestra. Rider on the Plains was nominated for a 2008 Grammy Award for Producer of the Year, Classical category for producer Blanton Alspaugh. Feldman's second album, Our American Roots, was released in 2013. It features George Gershwin's Three Preludes, arranged for cello and piano by Feldman, as well as renditions of music by Aaron Copland, Samuel Barber and George Walker. As a composer, Feldman's original compositions include the three-movement "Enigma No. 1", written for cello and bass, and "Synergy", written for string orchestra.

Feldman has performed as the principal cellist in the Boston Philharmonic and Boston Pops Esplanade Orchestra; as a soloist with the Nashville Chamber Orchestra, Emmanuel Music, Dinosaur Annex Music Ensemble, New England String Ensemble, New Bedford Symphony Orchestra, and the Boston Modern Orchestra Project; and alongside Bobby McFerrin, Borromeo String Quartet, David Deveau, Marcus Thompson and Gilbert Kalish. He is a faculty member at Boston's New England Conservatory, where he was the cello teacher of Zlatomir Fung, and at the Department of Music at Tufts University, and has also taught cello at Brown University and the University of Massachusetts Dartmouth.

== Personal life ==
Feldman and his wife, Pascale Delache-Feldman, a double bassist, are based in Boston, Massachusetts. They met while studying at the Curtis Institute of Music.

== Discography ==
=== Albums ===
| Year | Title |
|---|---|
| 2002 | Axiom Duo: By: Axiom Duo; Released: 2002; Label: Synergy Classics; Formats: CD |
| 2006 | Rider on the Plains: Cello Concertos: By: Emmanuel Feldman; Released: October 24, 2006; Label: Albany Records; Formats: CD, digital download |
| 2013 | Our American Roots: Gershwin, Barber, Walker, Copland: By: Emmanuel Feldman and Joy Cline Phinney; Released: May 28, 2013; Label: Delos; Formats: CD, digital download |

=== Appears on ===
| Year | Album | Artist | Credits |
|---|---|---|---|
| 1993 | Noises, Sounds & Strange Airs | Ewazen, Heinick, Marshall and Snow | Cello |
| 1995 | Visions: Words for the Future | Boston Gay Men's Chorus | Cello |
| 2007 | Chamber Music | Armand Qualliotine | Cello |
| 2008 | 5th Season | Jonathan Sacks | Cello |
| 2009 | Bloom | Michael J. Evans | Cello |
| 2010 | Classical Contemporary Chamber Music for the 21st Century, Volume 1 | Essex Chamber Music Players | Cello |
| 2010 | Nantucket Dreaming | Carson Cooman | Cello |
| 2010 | Tendrils | Byron Petty, Robert Stewart and Peter Homans | Cello |
| 2015 | Chamber Music | Julian Wachner | Cello |
| 2015 | Winter Shore | Benjamin Sabey | Cello |
| 2016 | Territory of the Heart | Douglas Bruce Johnson | Cello |
