= Music for a Time of War =

2011 concert program and album by the Oregon Symphony

- Orchestra: Oregon Symphony
- Conductor: Carlos Kalmar
- Composers: Charles Ives; John Adams; Benjamin Britten; Ralph Vaughan Williams
- Venue: Arlene Schnitzer Concert Hall, Portland, Oregon; Carnegie Hall, New York City
- Album recording: Music for a Time of War
- Date: May 7–8; 12, 2011
- Guests: Sanford Sylvan

Music for a Time of War is a 2011 concert program and subsequent album by the Oregon Symphony under the artistic direction of Carlos Kalmar. The program consists of four compositions inspired by war: Charles Ives' The Unanswered Question (1906), John Adams' The Wound-Dresser (1989), Benjamin Britten's Sinfonia da Requiem (1940) and Ralph Vaughan Williams' Symphony No. 4 (1935). The program was performed on May 7, 2011, at the Arlene Schnitzer Concert Hall in Portland, Oregon, and again the following day. Both concerts were recorded for album release. On May 12, the Oregon Symphony repeated the program at the inaugural Spring for Music Festival, at Carnegie Hall. The performance was broadcast live by KQAC and WQXR-FM, the classical radio stations serving Portland and the New York City metropolitan area, respectively. The concerts marked the Oregon Symphony's first performances of The Wound-Dresser as well as guest baritone Sanford Sylvan's debut with the company.

In October 2011 the recording of the Portland performances was released on CD by PentaTone Classics. The recording debuted at number 31 on Billboard's Classical Albums chart. The album earned three recognitions from the National Academy of Recording Arts and Sciences for the 2013 Grammy Awards. Producer Blanton Alspaugh received the award for Producer of the Year, Classical for his contributions to Music for a Time of War and other recordings.

== Program ==
Music for a Time of War contains four 20th-century classical compositions based on the theme of war. Kalmar stated that the program was not inspired by current events and that not every composition was written specifically because of war. He also warned that audiences should not attend the performances anticipating an optimistic conclusion:

There is redemption in our concert, but not at the end. I think that is an important point. I don't think that anybody who goes to this concert will come out and think everything is alright. I think the pacing is good because nothing is alright. If we humans have to live with war, that is pretty much what the message should be.

The program began with Charles Ives' The Unanswered Question, originally the first of Two Contemplations, composed in 1906 (along with its counterpart Central Park in the Dark). Theodore Bloomfield, who served as music director of the Oregon Symphony from 1955 to 1959, conducted its world premiere at the Juilliard School in New York in 1946. The second composition was The Wound-Dresser, American minimalist composer John Adams' portrayal of Walt Whitman's experience as a medic during the American Civil War. The program continued with Benjamin Britten's Sinfonia da Requiem (1940), commissioned by the Japanese government to commemorate the 2,600th anniversary of the Japanese Empire. The performance ended with Ralph Vaughan Williams' Symphony No. 4, composed during 1931–1934.

== Performances and broadcasts ==
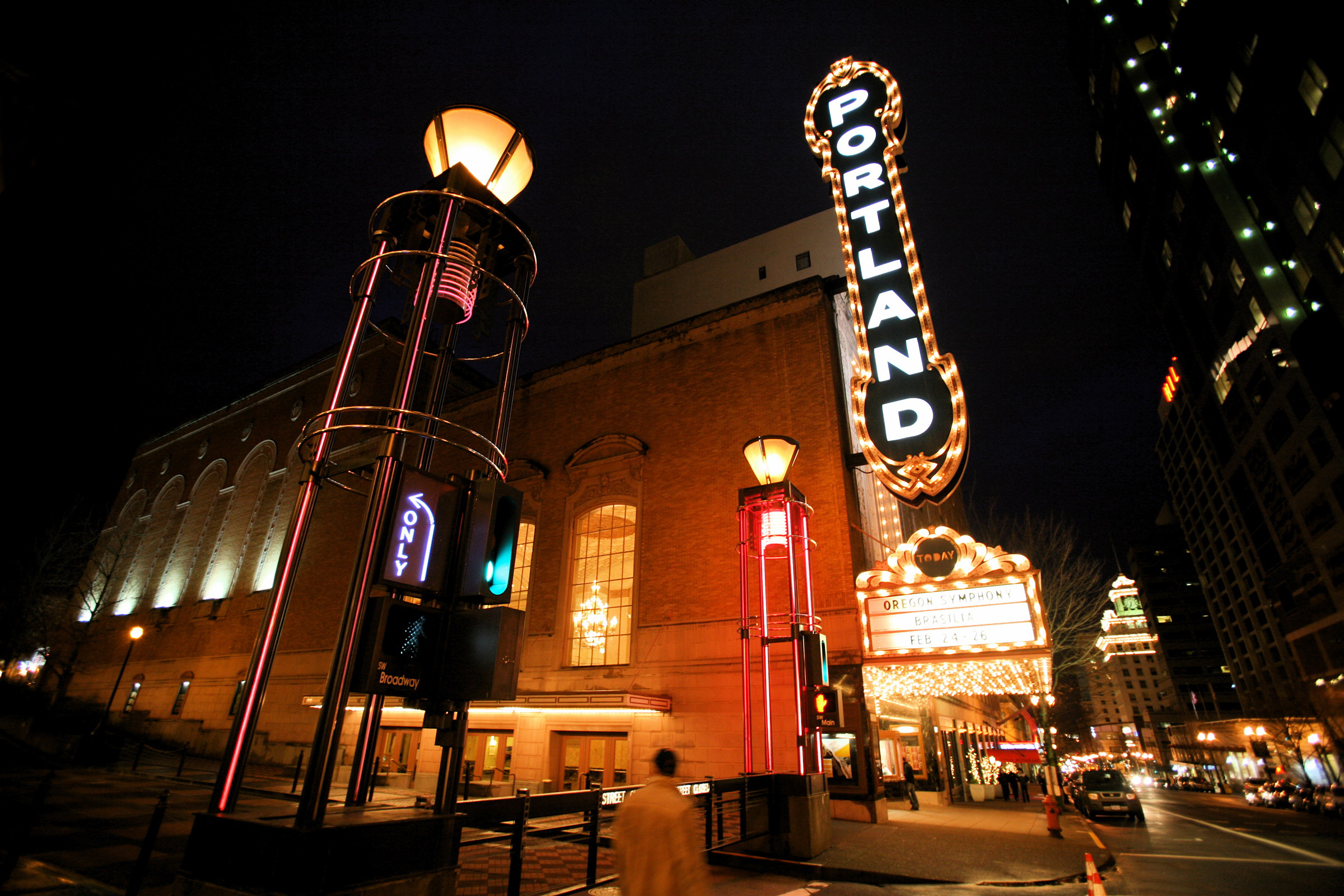
Portland, Oregon's Arlene Schnitzer Concert Hall, where the program debuted and was recorded for album release

The Oregon Symphony presented the program at the Arlene Schnitzer Concert Hall in Portland the evening of May 7 and the afternoon of May 8, 2011. Both performances were recorded for album release by the Boston-based company Soundmirror.

On May 12, the Oregon Symphony repeated the program at the inaugural Spring for Music Festival, marking the orchestra's Carnegie Hall debut. The symphony raised $300,000 to fund travel and hotel expenses for the concert series. In addition to the Oregon Symphony, the inaugural festival presented seven ensembles within nine days, including the Albany Symphony Orchestra, Dallas Symphony Orchestra, Montreal Symphony Orchestra, Orpheus Chamber Orchestra, Saint Paul Chamber Orchestra and Toledo Symphony Orchestra. Orchestras were invited based on their submitted program proposals. No other ensemble presented a program themed by a single topic. In February 2011, three months before the Carnegie Hall performance, The Oregonian reported that nearly half of the 1,000 tickets reserved for distribution by the Oregon Symphony had been sold. Kalmar later confirmed that 450 Oregonians traveled to New York City to witness the performance.

The Carnegie Hall performance was broadcast live across the United States. Portland's classical radio station, KQAC, broadcast the concert live throughout the Pacific Northwest as part of an ongoing partnership with the symphony. WQXR-FM, the classical radio station licensed to Newark, New Jersey and serving the New York City metropolitan area, broadcast the performance live in 3D sound in collaboration with the design and engineering consulting company Arup. WQXR also hosted a live chat on their website. Prior to the live broadcast, WQXR's Q2 Music provided their own take on the Oregon Symphony's war-themed concert by airing a program with works by Lowell Liebermann, Seppo Pohjola, Steve Reich, Frederic Rzewski, Dmitri Shostakovich and John Adams. KQAC rebroadcast the program in November. In April 2012, the station broadcast the album recording and has since aired individual works.

=== Reception (concert) ===
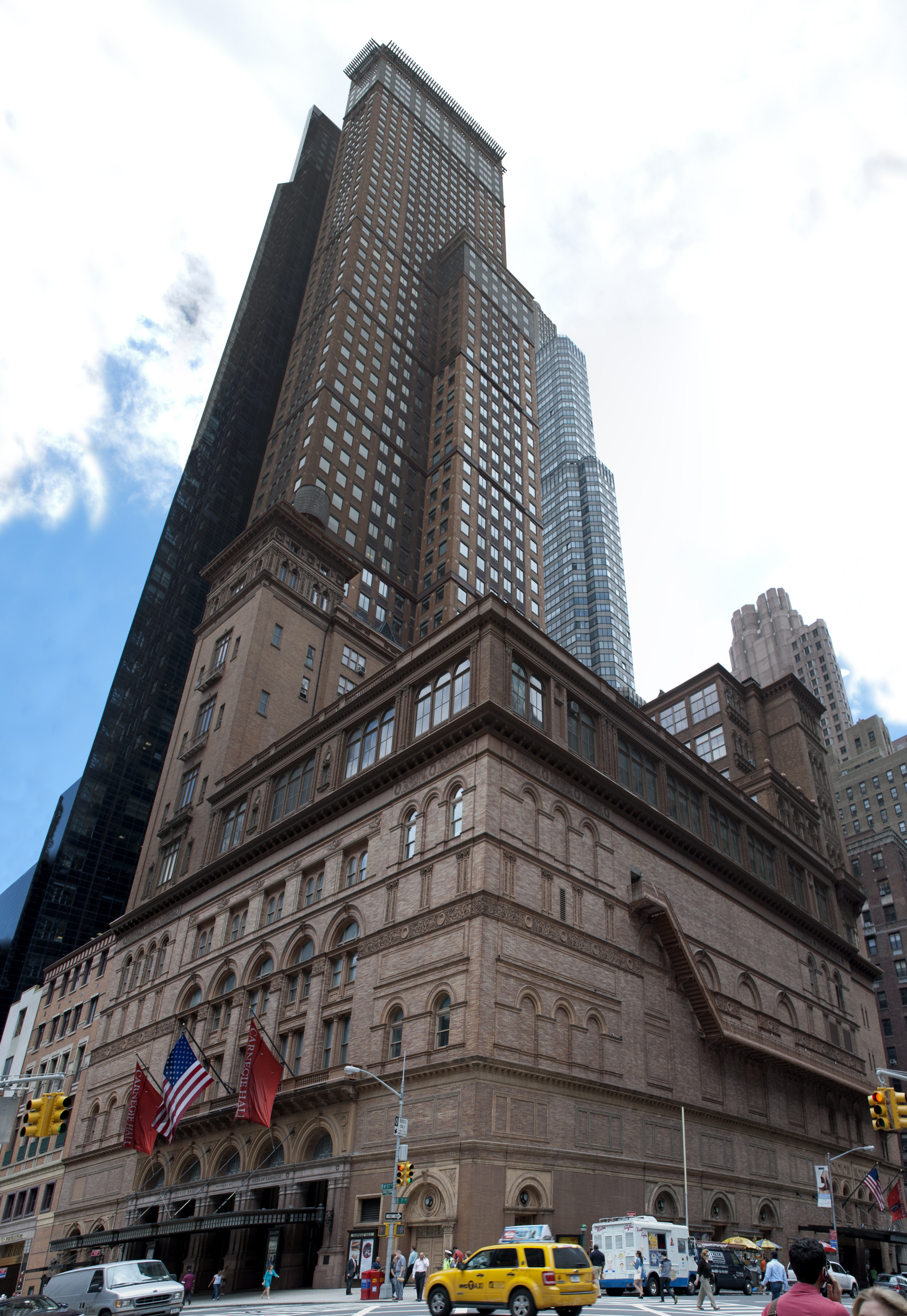
Carnegie Hall (pictured in 2010), where the Oregon Symphony performed at the inaugural Spring for Music Festival to a positive reception

The concert program received a positive reception. The Oregonian's David Stabler wrote that during the May 7 performance the orchestra displayed peak condition and "played with a precision and intensity that would have been unattainable a decade ago". He complimented Sylvan's diction and "emotional engagement", but noted that some words were difficult to make out. Stabler called the timpanist's performance during Britten's symphony "fierce" and the orchestra's playing "clear and intentional". In his review of the Carnegie Hall performance, Stabler opined that the Oregon Symphony's program (which he described as one of "rage, brutality and fleeting beauty that required the utmost precision and ferocity from the musicians") focused more on playing, while the programs by other orchestras drew attention to the music. Stabler wrote: "Everyone knows orchestras are fighting to survive, but on this night, the Oregon Symphony breathed long and deep of triumph." In a separate article summarizing reviews by New York critics, Stabler called the Symphony a "virtuosos band" that "now plays with more acute rhythmic precision, more clarity, more informed style ... and more extreme dynamics and tempos". James Bash of Oregon Music News wrote a positive review of the New York performance, describing it as more enhanced, dramatic and intense than the Portland concerts, partly because of the venue's superior acoustics. Bash described the orchestra's performance of The Unanswered Question as "compelling and auspicious" and wrote that Sylvan's vocals during The Wound-Dresser "conveyed the sensitive text superbly". In addition to complimenting the symphony overall, Bash singled out solo performers by name. After noting the audience's enthusiastic response to the performance, including multiple bravos and particular recognition for Kalmar, Bash quipped "the Oregon Symphony may be regional in terms of size and budget, but they are world-class when they play".

Following the New York concert, music critic Alex Ross tweeted: "Triumphant Carnegie debut for the Oregon Symphony -- best of Spring for Music so far. Eloquent Sylvan, explosive Vaughan Williams." On his blog, "The Rest Is Noise", Ross called the symphony's performance "extraordinary", one of the "most gripping events of the current season". In his two-page review of Spring for Music for The New Yorker, Ross devoted more coverage to the Oregon Symphony than the other featured ensembles and considered Music for a Time of War the festival's highpoint. He complimented the orchestra for playing with "controlled intensity" and said of Symphony No. 4: "The Oregonians' furious rendition of that symphony would have been impressive in any context, but as the capstone to a brilliantly worked-out program it had shattering force." The review contained an illustration of Kalmar, "hair flying and all". Sedgwick Clark of Musical America called the orchestra's performance of the Williams' piece "positively searing ... with fearless edge-of-seat tempos ... breathtakingly negotiated by all." After Clark's review was published, Ross posted on his blog that he and Clark concurred: the symphony's performance was the most "remarkable" of the season. Ross included the symphony's concert on his list of the most memorable classical performances of 2011. Allan Kozinn, music critic for The New York Times, considered the program "pained" and "thought-provoking", and wrote that Sylvan performed with his "characteristic acuity". He called the woodwind and brass playing in Sinfonia da Requiem "superb", specifically highlighting the "pointed" percussion in "Dies Irae" and the "haunting" string tone in "Requiem Aeternam". Like Ross, Kozinn thought Symphony No. 4 was performed "with a furious, incendiary energy" that made an ideal ending to the program.

In September 2011, the symphony confirmed that Kalmar's contract, previously set to expire in 2013, had been extended until 2015. According to the organization, his contract was renewed "in recognition of his significant accomplishments", specifically acknowledging the Carnegie Hall performance. The orchestra was invited to perform again at the 2013 Spring for Music Festival as one of two returning ensembles. Kalmar said of the return invitation, "To be invited once is a thrill. To be invited twice is clear proof that we are in the artistic big leagues." However, in October 2012 the symphony announced it would not accept the invitation for financial reasons.

== Album ==
Music for a Time of War

Studio album by Oregon Symphony
- Released: October 25, 2011
- Recorded: May 7–8, 2011
- Venues: Arlene Schnitzer Concert Hall, Portland, Oregon
- Genre: Classical
- Length: 78:04
- Label: PentaTone Classics
- Producer: Blanton Alspaugh

Oregon Symphony chronology
Tragic Lovers (2008)	Music for a Time of War (2011)	This England (2012)

Music for a Time of War was released on CD by PentaTone Classics on October 25, 2011. It was recorded in hybrid multichannel (surround sound) Super Audio CD format. Blanton Alspaugh served as producer. John Newton and Jesse Lewis were the recording engineers; mastering and authoring was conducted by Jesse Brayman. In addition to recording the performances, Soundmirror edited, mixed and mastered the audio.

The album contains nine tracks (Sinfonia da Requiem and Symphony No. 4 are divided into separate tracks for each movement) and totals just over 78 minutes in length. Program notes for the recording were written by Steven Kruger. The album's cover art photo is credited to orchestra member Martha Warrington.

Music for a Time of War marked the orchestra's first recording in eight years as well as Kalmar's first with the Oregon Symphony. The recording is the first of four albums to be produced by the symphony and PentaTone through the end of the 2014–2015 season, all under Kalmar's artistic leadership.

=== Reception (album) ===
Professional ratings
Review scores
Source	Rating
The Absolute Sound	4.5/5 stars
AllMusic	4.5/5 stars

The album performed well commercially and received favorable reviews. Music for a Time of War debuted and peaked at number 31 on Billboard's Classical Albums chart the week of November 19, 2011. On November 19, BBC Radio 3 reviewed the album on its program "CD Review", which discusses and recommends new classical music recordings. AllMusic's Mike Brownell awarded the album 4.5 out of 5 stars and wrote that the Symphony "prove[d] they can easily stand alongside the world's great orchestras". Audiophile Audition's John Sunier thought the program was "well-chosen to offer great variety in sound and compositional techniques". Michael Miller of The Berkshire Review appreciated the "precision and sensitivity" of the playing and Karlmar's "lucid, straightforward, and ... virile" approach to the program. Miller also complimented Sylvan's performance and called the recording "memorable" and "thrilling", recommending it for any classical music library. Brian Horay, a classical music critic for The Huffington Post, questioned Kalmar's claim that his selections should not be interpreted as political, writing that listeners "[encounter] a more difficult and nuanced 20th-century musical landscape of existential questions, gruesome descriptions, defiant submissions and cold dissonance." Horay continued, "Music for a Time of War serves as a powerful acoustic journey of peaceful resistance and questioning of power". Barry Forshaw of the Islington Gazette thought the war theme was "tendentious" but called the collection "enterprising". James Bash of Oregon Music News called the album a "brilliant stunner", mirroring his positive review of the Carnegie Hall performance.

Soundmirror also received compliments. Andrew Quint of The Absolute Sound described the sound as "vivid, highly detailed, and dynamic" as well as avoiding "digital steeliness". Quint called the front-to-back layering outstanding. John Sunier said the recording's "rich surround sonics" bring together excellent performances and "first-rate fidelity". He also noted the lack of audience interference, suggesting either good behavior by attendees or subtle work by audio engineers. Michael Miller complimented the quality of the recording for having "no problems of intonation or ensemble" and said the album "belongs in the reference collection of any audiophile, whether they are inclined to multichannel playback or not". Miller specifically appreciated Alspaugh and the engineers for capturing the loudness and subtleties of Sinfonia da Requiem. International Record Review's Nigel Simeone recommended the recording, calling it "impressive" and writing that the live sound is "exceptionally vibrant". Kalman Rubinson of Stereophile commended the ensemble, PentaTone and Soundmirror for providing "spacious, transparent, powerful sound". Rubinson, who designated the recording as the year's best concept album, praised the program for being "thought-provoking and restorative" and appreciated the range of emotions it summoned.

Several publications included Music for a Time of War on their lists of the best classical recordings of 2011. Eugene Weekly recommended the album as a "stocking stuffer" on their list of the best Oregon classical music recordings of the year. Contributor Brett Campbell called the recording one of the year's "most compelling", with "blistering, committed, sharply etched performances" that illustrate the orchestra's quality under Kalmar's leadership. Similarly, Portland Monthly included Music for a Time of War on its list of fifteen "giftable" Portland albums. Alex Ross of The New Yorker included the album on his list of the ten most "exceptional" classical music recordings of the year. New York City's Time Out included the album as number seven on their list of the ten "Best Classical Albums of 2011". The publication's Steve Smith called the collection "greater than the sum of its parts". James Manishen of the Winnipeg Free Press included Music for a Time of War as number three on his list of the ten best classical recordings of the year, calling the performances "superbly prepared". The album received its second pressing in February 2012.

Producer Alspaugh received a Grammy award for Producer of the Year, Classical for his contributions to the album and other recordings.

=== Track listing ===
Adapted from AllMusic and the album's liner notes.

1. The Unanswered Question (Charles Ives) – 5:44
2. The Wound-Dresser (John Adams) – 20:18

Sinfonia da Requiem, Op. 20 (Benjamin Britten)

3. "Lacrymosa (Andante ben misurato)" – 8:34
4. "Dies Irae (Allegro con fuoco)" – 4:53
5. "Requiem Aeternam (Andante molto tranquillo)" – 5:36

Symphony No. 4 in F minor (Ralph Vaughan Williams)

6. "Allegro" – 8:57
7. "Andante moderato" – 10:01
8. "Scherzo: Allegro molto" – 5:22
9. "Finale con epilogo fugato: Allegro molto – con anima" – 8:33

== Personnel ==
Credits adapted from AllMusic and the album's liner notes.

- Blanton Alspaugh – producer
- Carlos Kalmar – conductor, primary artist
- Steven Kruger – liner notes
- Jesse Lewis – engineer
- Jesse Brayman – authoring, mastering
- John Newton – engineer
- Oregon Symphony – orchestra, primary artist
- Franz Steiger – liner note translation
- Sanford Sylvan – baritone
- Walt Whitman – text

== See also ==
- 2011 in American music
- 2011 in classical music
- List of compositions by Benjamin Britten
- List of compositions by Charles Ives
