= Symphony No. 5 (Vaughan Williams) =

Musical work; symphony in four movements composed by Ralph Vaughan Williams

Vaughan Williams in 1922

Ralph Vaughan Williams wrote his Symphony No. 5 in D major between 1938 and 1943. In style it represents a shift away from the violent dissonance of his Fourth Symphony, and a return to the gentler style of the earlier Pastoral Symphony.

Many of the musical themes in the Fifth Symphony stem from Vaughan Williams's then-unfinished operatic work, The Pilgrim's Progress. This opera, or "morality" as Vaughan Williams preferred to call it, had been in gestation for decades, and the composer had temporarily abandoned it at the time the symphony was conceived. Despite its origins, the symphony is without programmatic content.

The work was an immediate success at its premiere in 1943, and is frequently performed in concert and on record.

== History ==
=== Background ===
In 1935 Vaughan Williams had caused surprise and even shock with his Fourth Symphony, (Note: The composer did not allocate numbers to any of his symphonies before No 8, but the Fourth, Fifth and Sixth have nevertheless generally been referred to by number.) a strident and dissonant piece in great contrast with its quiet and contemplative predecessor, A Pastoral Symphony (1922). After this he experienced a temporary writer's block, before he began writing his Fifth Symphony in 1938. He had been working intermittently for more than thirty years on what became his opera (or "Morality") The Pilgrim's Progress. (Note: Vaughan Williams had first written music for Bunyan's The Pilgrim’s Progress in 1906 for a dramatisation at Reigate Priory. In 1922 he set a "Pastoral Episode" from the book as his first opera, the one-act The Shepherds of the Delectable Mountains. In 1942–43 he composed incidental music for a BBC Radio adaptation of the book. The culmination of his work on Bunyan's book was The Pilgrim's Progress, premiered in 1951.) Believing that the opera might never be completed he decided to incorporate some of its ideas and themes into other works, most notably the Fifth Symphony.

The symphony was complete enough by the end of 1942 for the composer to prepare a two-piano transcription, which two friends played for him in late January 1943. Any doubts he had about the piece were allayed when he heard the first orchestral run-through on 25 May. (Note: There is conflict between the sources about the location of and orchestra for the run-through. Ursula Vaughan Williams says that the orchestra was the London Philharmonic Orchestra and the venue Abbey Road Studios; Michael Kennedy gives the orchestra as the BBC Symphony Orchestra (under Sir Adrian Boult) and the location Bedford, the orchestra's temporary wartime base.) He found that the symphony said what he meant it to.

=== Dedication ===
Vaughan Williams dedicated the symphony to Jean Sibelius. The musicologist J. P. E. Harper-Scott has called Sibelius "the influence of choice" among British symphonists in the years between the two World Wars, citing Walton's First Symphony, all seven of Bax's and the first five of Havergal Brian. The wording of the dedication differs between the manuscript and the published score: the ascription on the manuscript reads "Dedicated without permission and with the sincerest flattery to Jean Sibelius, whose great example is worthy of all imitation"; this was abbreviated on the published score to "Dedicated without permission to Jean Sibelius". The lack of "permission" may have resulted from problems of communication during World War II, given that Finland was at war with the Soviet Union, a British ally, at the time. Sir Adrian Boult subsequently secured permission, corresponding with Sibelius through an intermediary (Kurt Atterberg) in a neutral country (Sweden). After listening to a broadcast of the work, Sibelius wrote to Atterberg, "I heard Dr. Ralph Vaughan Williams' new Symphony from Stockholm under the excellent leadership of Malcolm Sargent ... This Symphony is a marvellous work ... the dedication made me feel proud and grateful ... I wonder if Dr. Williams has any idea of the pleasure he has given me?" (Note: The dedication may have contributed to early public interest in the symphony, especially in England, given Sibelius's popularity there. In the words of Simona Pakenham, it was enough to send listeners to the premiere performance in London "with their ears pricked to detect echoes of the great Finnish composer in Vaughan Williams's work".)

The wording of the dedication led to speculation as to whether the work contains any direct quotations or imitations of Sibelius. Vaughan Williams made a study of Sibelius's music, notably his Symphony No. 4, before working on his own Symphony No. 5. Similarities in orchestration are evident, such as the atmospheric string writing midway through the first movement of the Vaughan Williams work, noted in the following section. A case for an actual quotation has been made by Robert Matthew-Walker, who notes a subtle similarity in the opening bars of the Fourth and Fifth Symphonies of Sibelius and Vaughan Williams, respectively, concealed by the contrasting moods of the two pieces (in each case, the motif spanning a tritone C–D–F♯ is followed by the repeated interval E–F♯ over a pedal C).

== Composition ==
The symphony is scored for two flutes (one doubling piccolo), oboe, cor anglais, two clarinets, two bassoons, two French horns, two trumpets, three trombones, timpani and strings. This is a smaller orchestra than Vaughan Williams used in his four earlier symphonies, with only two horns, no tuba, no harps and no percussion except timpani.

The symphony is in the customary four-movement form:

1. Preludio
2. Scherzo
3. Romanza
4. Passacaglia

The composer provided metronome markings for all four movements, but they are widely regarded as dubious: the composer did not observe them when he conducted the work, and he expressed approval of Boult's tempi, which were similar to his own. His musical assistant Roy Douglas has suggested that Vaughan Williams simply miscalculated because he did not possess a metronome.

In addition to the Pilgrim's Progress allusions, the score has echoes of Vaughan Williams's hymn tune "Sine nomine", in the second subject of the first movement and at the end of the fourth movement.

=== I. Preludio ===
The first movement, in Frank Howes's analysis (1954), can be seen either as "an elaborate ternary form with coda" or "an exposition of two big groups of themes succeeded without development by a condensed recapitulation". This movement owes something to sonata form, but does not display all its characteristics; the second subject has been derived from the first subject. The movement opens with a pedal C in the bass, answered by a horn call outlining a D major chord in a dotted rhythm, which implies mixolydian D.

The violins use the notes of the pentatonic scale, making the key ambiguous. Wilfrid Mellers believes this is why Vaughan Williams billed the movement as a Preludio, "which suggests an emergent state". The horn call motif fluctuates from major to minor, outlining the tonal ambiguity, moving between the mixolydian and dorian modes, which becomes a characteristic of the movement. The bass's C pedal becomes the tonic when the key changes to either the aeolian or dorian modes. The modality then moves to E, with a new melody in the violins, which, although it does not include a sharpened seventh, outlines E major. The bass, now played pizzicato, supports the melody both melodically and harmonically and the texture incorporates suspensions and passing notes, making the harmony richer. A sudden descent of a semitone, an idea previously used in Vaughan Williams's works Fantasia on a Theme by Thomas Tallis and Job, marks a key change to three flats and also the development section. The tempo accelerates to allegro for the development. The strings are used to imply the winds of nature, in a similar vein to that of Sibelius. This is punctuated by the brass and woodwind with the falling semitone motif, which gets larger intervallically to a major second and then a minor third. This section is a canon; the polyphony of which Mellers believes shows the randomness of nature. The key shifts down mediants, until it reaches D minor, when the strings imitate Sibelius again, this time using tremolo effects.

For the recapitulation the tempo slows and the dynamics are reduced. The C pedal is reintroduced, but this time in a more melodic fashion. There is more development in the recapitulation. The movement ends in a similar way to the opening, with the horn call, but the key signature of two flats rather than one sharp is used. The basses descend to C via E♭, leaving the tonality of the movement still in question.

Arnold Whittall argues that "With respect to D Major, the Preludio might be regarded as a clear case of Schoenbergian 'Schwebende Tonalität' ('fluctuating: suspended, not yet decided' tonality)", although Vaughan Williams stated that Schoenberg's music meant nothing to him.

=== II. Scherzo ===
Vaughan Williams uses rhythm in the Scherzo to convey different effects. The focus of the movement is on the rhythm rather than the ambiguous tonality of the Preludio. Lionel Pike comments that "at times it seems more like a counterpoint of rhythms than of pitches." The movement begins with three dotted minims in a fast 3/4 time (. = 120), and then minims for four bars, which create hemiolas and then crotchets. This gives the illusion that the music is accelerating, and so the pulse does not settle. When the melodic line begins, the music is divided into five bar phrases.

A sense of stability is established when the theme is repeated by the viola and double bass in stable two bar phrases. However, the violins enter with phrasing that does not conform to either pattern, thus adding more confusion. Using this rhythmic phrasing, the dorian line played on the violins and the aeolian woodwind line are differentiated rhythmically, as well as tonally. The rhythmical confusion is halted when the wind and strings alternate downward runs antiphonally.

=== III. Romanza ===
In the manuscript score Vaughan Williams headed this movement with words taken from Bunyan:

Upon that place there stood a cross
And a little below a sepulchre … Then he said
"He hath given me rest by his sorrow and
Life by his death"

The third and fourth lines were later sung in the opera by Pilgrim. The inscription was omitted from the published score in accordance with the composer's wish that the symphony should be regarded as absolute music. The movement may be considered the spiritual core of the work: Frank Howes calls it "the heart of the symphony" and David Cox calls it "a profound meditation on the three main musical elements presented at the outset". It is not clear why the composer called it "Romanza". Howes comments that with its spiritual, meditative nature there is nothing "romantic" about this movement; Michael Kennedy observes that with Vaughan Williams the term "is always a signal that the music was of special significance to him".

The opening cor anglais solo is taken virtually without change.

Rising fourths again appear as connecting passages.

=== IV. Passacaglia ===
Although this movement begins with the repetitive bass line characteristic of the passacaglia form, Vaughan Williams eventually abandons it. The triumphant primary melody of the passacaglia is used as Pilgrim's dialogue with Interpreter in the second half of "The House Beautiful" scene, while the fanfare motif recalls "The Arming of the Pilgrim" in Act II Scene 1. This ushers in a return of the themes from the first movement of the symphony, which are resolved into a quiet valediction played first by the woodwind and then by the upper strings.

== Premieres and publication ==
The Fifth Symphony was premiered on 24 June 1943 at a Prom concert in the Royal Albert Hall, London, by the London Philharmonic Orchestra conducted by the composer. Sir Henry Wood, the founder and presiding figure of the Proms, was originally intended to conduct the performance but was not well enough and the composer was persuaded to take the baton. The American premiere was given in Carnegie Hall on 30 November 1944 by the New York Philharmonic under Artur Rodziński.

The score of the symphony was published by Oxford University Press (OUP) in 1946. Vaughan Williams lightly revised the score in 1951, but that revision was not published during his lifetime. It was published in 1961, re-engraved with corrections in 1969, and in 2008 OUP issued a new edition, edited by Peter Horton, to commemorate the 50th anniversary of the composer's death.

== Reception ==
In a survey of Vaughan Williams's nine symphonies, Elliott Schwartz writes:

When the Symphony in D major was first performed in 1943, it was instantly acclaimed by the listening public. Its success resulted from many factors, most notably the serenity of the work itself as contrasted with the severity of the war then in progress, as well as the allusions to The Pilgrim's Progress.

Hubert Foss comments that public appreciation of the symphony "was more immediate than that of perhaps any other single work by the composer".

The response of music critics was generally enthusiastic. The anonymous reviewer in The Times wrote that the symphony "belongs to that small body of music that, outside of late Beethoven, can properly be described as transcendental … this is music not only of contemplation but of benediction". A grudging note was struck by William Glock, a proponent of avant-garde music, who commented in The Observer that the symphony was "like the work of a distinguished poet who has nothing very new to say, but says it in exquisitely flowing language". Neville Cardus wrote, "The Fifth Symphony contains the most benedictory and consoling music of our time." When the first recording came out in 1944 (see below) The Observer was more welcoming than Glock had been the year before, saying that the Fifth was to the Fourth Symphony as The Tempest is to King Lear … ideal beauty."

After its premiere at a Prom concert in June 1943, the symphony was given in each of the following four seasons, conducted by Boult (1944 and 1947) and Basil Cameron (1945 and 1946). Eighteen further performances were given in subsequent Prom seasons between 1949 and 2020. (Note: The conductors for these performances were Sargent, Vaughan Williams, Trevor Harvey, Cameron, Sir John Barbirolli, Boult, Sir Charles Groves, Vernon Handley, Sir Andrew Davis, Sir Roger Norrington, Jerzy Maksymiuk, Andrew Manze and Simon Rattle.) In 1994 the composer Anthony Payne wrote of the symphony:

This is music that has no place for the dramatic outbursts of the Fourth and Sixth Symphonies, yet their agonies lie beneath its spiritual radiance, sometimes staining its surface and making its calm breadth one of Vaughan Williams' bravest achievements.

== Recordings ==
The symphony was first recorded within a year of the premiere, under the auspices of the British Council. More than thirty recordings have been issued subsequently.

Conductor	Orchestra	Venue	Date	Ref
Ralph Vaughan Williams	London Philharmonic	Royal Albert Hall, London	24 June 1943	
John Barbirolli	Hallé	Houldsworth Hall, Manchester	17 Feb 1944	
Serge Koussevitzky	Boston Symphony	Sanders Theater, Harvard University	4 Mar 1947	
Ralph Vaughan Williams	London Philharmonic	Royal Albert Hall, London	3 Sep 1952	
Sir Adrian Boult	London Philharmonic	Kingsway Hall, London	2–4 Dec 1953	
Sir John Barbirolli	Philharmonia	Kingsway Hall	8–9 May 1962	
Sir Adrian Boult	London Philharmonic	Wembley Town Hall	1–3 Apr 1969	
André Previn	London Symphony	Kingsway Hall	25 & 28 May 1971	
Gennady Rozhdestvensky	BBC Symphony	Royal Festival Hall, London	22 Oct 1980	
Sir Alexander Gibson	Royal Philharmonic	EMI Abbey Road Studios, London	25–26 May 1982	
Vernon Handley	Royal Liverpool Philharmonic	Philharmonic Hall, Liverpool	Sep 1986	
Bryden Thomson	London Symphony	St Jude's Church, Hampstead	7–8 Apr 1987	
Yehudi Menuhin	Royal Philharmonic	All Saints Church, Tooting	30–31 Dec 1987	
André Previn	Royal Philharmonic	Walthamstow Assembly Hall	6–7 Jul 1988	
Gennady Rozhdestvensky	USSR State Symphony	Philharmonia Building, Leningrad	30 Oct 1988	
Leonard Slatkin	Philharmonia	Watford Town Hall	6–8 Apr 1990	
Sir Neville Marriner	Academy of Saint Martin in the Fields	Henry Wood Hall, London	May 1990	
Andrew Davis	BBC Symphony	St Augustine's Church, Kilburn	Dec 1992	
Bernard Haitink	London Philharmonic	Royal Festival Hall	15 Dec 1994	
Bernard Haitink	London Philharmonic	Abbey Road	17–18 Dec 1994	
André Previn	Orchestra of the Curtis Institute of Music	Giandomenico Studios, Collingswood, NJ	8–9 Feb 1995	
Kees Bakels	Bournemouth Symphony	Poole Arts Centre	7–13 Sep 1996	
Roger Norrington	London Philharmonic	Watford Colosseum	25–27 Nov 1996	
Richard Hickox	London Symphony	All Saints, Tooting	28 Oct 1997	
Walter Hilgers	Brandenburgischen Staatsorchester, Frankfurt (Oder)	Konzerthalle Carl Philipp Emanuel Bach, Frankfurt (Oder)	22 Jun & 26 Aug 2005	
Robert Spano	Atlanta Symphony	Woodruff Arts Center, Atlanta	25 Sep–3 Oct 2006	
Peter Oundjian	Toronto Symphony	Roy Thomson Hall, Toronto	Nov 2008	
Martin Yates	Bournemouth Symphony	Lighthouse, Poole	1 Jul 2011	
Leon Botstein	American Symphony	Fisher Center, Annandale-on-Hudson	21 Aug 2011	
Sir Mark Elder	Hallé	Bridgewater Hall, Manchester	9 Nov 2011	
Carlos Kalmar	Oregon Symphony	Schnitzer Hall, Portland, Oregon	18–19 Feb 2012	
Douglas Boyd	Musikkollegium Winterthur	Stadthaus, Winterthur	21–25 Feb 2012	
Douglas Bostock	Argovia Philharmonic	Kultur & Kongresshaus, Aarau	3–5 Nov 2013	
Andrew Manze	Royal Liverpool Philharmonic	Philharmonic Hall, Liverpool	21–23 Apr 2017	
Michael Collins	Philharmonia	Watford Colosseum	Jul 2019	
Martyn Brabbins	BBC Symphony	Watford Colosseum	4–5 November 2019	
Sir Antonio Pappano	London Symphony	Barbican Hall	17-18 Apr 2024	

== Notes, references and sources ==
=== Sources ===
- Atlas, Allan (Autumn 2011). "On the proportions of the passacaglia (fourth movement) of Vaughan Williams's Fifth Symphony". The Musical Times. 152 (1916): 19–32. JSTOR 23037971. (subscription required)
- Bunyan, John (1904) [1678]. The Pilgrim's Progress. London: Oxford University Press. OCLC 1060352.
- Cox, David (1967). "Ralph Vaughan Williams". In Robert Simpson (ed.). The Symphony: Elgar to the Present Day. Harmondsworth: Pelican Books. OCLC 221594461.
- Culshaw, John (1981). Putting the Record Straight. London: Secker and Warburg. ISBN 978-0-436-11802-9.
- Douglas, Roy (1988). Working with Vaughan Williams. London: The British Library. ISBN 978-0-7123-0148-0.
- Foss, Hubert (1950). Ralph Vaughan Williams: a study. London: Harrap. OCLC 1106175387.
- Horton, Julian (2014). "The later symphonies". In Alain Frogley and Aidan J. Thomson (ed.). The Cambridge Companion to Vaughan Williams. Cambridge: Cambridge University Press. ISBN 978-0-521-16290-6.
- Howes, Frank (1954). The Music of Ralph Vaughan Williams. London: Oxford University Press. OCLC 459433504.
- Kennedy, Michael (2013). "Fluctuations in the response to the music of Ralph Vaughan Williams". In Alain Frogley and Aidan J. Thomson (ed.). The Cambridge Companion to Vaughan Williams. Cambridge: Cambridge University Press. ISBN 978-0-521-19768-7.
- Mellers, Wilfrid (1989). Vaughan Williams and the Vision of Albion. London: Barrie & Jenkins. ISBN 0-7126-2117-2.
- Moore, Jerrold Northrop (1979). Music and Friends – Letters to Adrian Boult. London: Hamish Hamilton. ISBN 0-241-10178-6.
- Pakenham, Simona (1957). Ralph Vaughan Williams: A Discovery of his Music. London: McMillan. OCLC 378480.
- Pike, Lionel (1996). Frogley, Alain (ed.). Vaughan Williams Studies. Rhythm in the symphonies: a preliminary investigation. New York: Cambridge University Press. pp. 166–186. ISBN 978-0-521-08864-0.
- Pike, Lionel (2003). Vaughan Williams and the Symphony. London: Toccata Press. ISBN 0-907689-54-X.
- Schwartz, Elliott (1982) [1964]. The Symphonies of Ralph Vaughan Williams. New York: Da Capo Press. ISBN 978-0-306-76137-9.
- Vaughan Williams, Ralph (1969) [1946]. Symphony No. 5. London: Oxford University Press. ISBN 978-0-19-369415-6.
- Vaughan Williams, Ursula (1964). RVW: A Biography of Ralph Vaughan Williams. Oxford: Oxford University Press. ISBN 978-0-19-315411-7.
- Whittall, Arnold (1996). Frogley, Alain (ed.). Vaughan Williams Studies. 'Symphony in D major': models and mutations. New York: Cambridge University Press. pp. 187–212. ISBN 978-0-521-08864-0.
