= The Wound-Dresser =

Piece by composer John Adams for chamber orchestra and baritone singer

- by John Adams
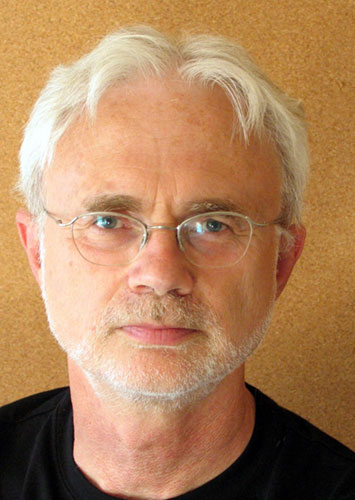
- Style: Postminimalism
- Commissioned by: Carillon Importers on behalf of Absolut Vodka, with assistance from the Saint Paul Chamber Orchestra through a gift from Daniel and Constance Kunin
- Text: "The Wound-Dresser" (Walt Whitman, 1865)
- Composed: 1988
- Duration: about 20 minutes
- Scoring: Chamber orchestra and baritone singer

Premiere
- Date: 24 February 1989
- Location: St Paul, Minnesota
- Conductor: John Adams
- Performers: Sanford Sylvan (baritone) Saint Paul Chamber Orchestra

The Wound-Dresser is a piece for chamber orchestra and baritone singer by composer John Adams. The piece is an elegiac setting of excerpts from American poet Walt Whitman's poem "The Wound-Dresser" (1865) about his experience as a hospital volunteer during the American Civil War.

It was written for baritone singer Sanford Sylvan, who premiered it on 24 February 1989 in St Paul, Minnesota, with the Saint Paul Chamber Orchestra conducted by the composer. It was subsequently recorded by the same forces for Nonesuch Records. Interpreters who have performed and recorded it since have included Thomas Hampson, Nathan Gunn, Jeremy Huw Williams, and Christopher Maltman.

In 2011, the Oregon Symphony performed and recorded the composition for Music for a Time of War.
