= WDAV =

Classical music radio station in Davidson–Charlotte, North Carolina

- Davidson, North Carolina; United States
- Broadcast area: Charlotte metropolitan area
- Frequency: 89.9 MHz (HD Radio)
- Branding: Classical Public Radio

Programming
- Format: Classical music and public radio
- Subchannels: HD2: Spanish and English classical music "Concierto"; HD3: Southern gospel "Joy FM"
- Affiliations: NPR

Ownership
- Owner: Davidson College

History
- First air date: 1973 (originally carrier current 1969-73)
- Call sign meaning: W DAVidson

Technical information
- Licensing authority: FCC
- Facility ID: 66503
- Class: C1
- ERP: 100,000 watts
- HAAT: 246 meters (807 ft)
- Transmitter coordinates: 35°26′54″N 80°50′23″W
- Translator: HD3: 91.3 W217AX (Harrisburg)

Links
- Public license information: Public file; LMS
- Webcast: Listen live
- Website: wdav.org

WDAV (89.9 FM "Classical 89.9") is a non-commercial public radio station licensed to Davidson, North Carolina and serving the Charlotte metropolitan area. The station, licensed to the Board of Trustees of Davidson College, airs classical music and fine arts programming 24 hours a day. WDAV is an NPR member-station.

WDAV has an effective radiated power (ERP) of 100,000 watts, the maximum for non-grandfathered FM stations. The transmitter is off Old Statesville Road in Huntersville, North Carolina. WDAV is also heard on 250 watt FM translator W217AX at 91.3 MHz in Harrisburg, North Carolina.

== Programming ==
WDAV programming originates locally for 24 hours each day, and the tempo of the music is based on the time of day, with "upbeat, inspirational" in the morning and "relaxing, kick-back" late in the day. As of 2018, music director Ted Weiner, who records the overnight show instead of doing it live, has been a full-time personality since 1986, the longest of anyone there. General manager Frank Dominguez, an employee for more than 25 years, hosts Concierto on the HD-2 channel, with composers and musicians from Latin America and Spain, and on 45 public stations. Station personalities include Mike McKay, Myelita Melton, Rachel Stewart and Joe Brant.

== History ==
WDAV signed on in 1973 as a student-run college radio station, taking over from a carrier current station that had been on the air since 1969. The format included jazz, rock music and educational programs. WDAV experimented with two hours of jazz in 1975. It was so popular the amount was increased to six hours and then twelve. The station also had 24 hours of classical music per week. In 1978, it was upgraded to a full-service professional operation. However, student volunteers quit because they did not want the station to go all classical, and it took three months to return to the air. WDAV became "Your station for the arts" and played mostly classical music.

The students asked for another carrier current station, and WALT 1610 came on the air. After years of on and off broadcasting, WALT has been reinstated and operated by students since 2014. WDAV began offering alternative rock for two hours a night on weeknights, and jazz on weekend nights, starting at 11:00. "Flipsides"'and "Jazzsides," hosted by students, featured music from over 2000 albums and rock artists such as Hüsker Dü, Meat Puppets, Fetchin Bones, The Replacements, P.I.L., Mojo Nixon and Skid Roper. In February 1996, WALT became a permanent station at 1610 AM, later adding a webcast.

In 1985, WDAV made plans to increase its signal from 20,000 to 100,000 watts using a directional antenna to prevent interference with WEPR. The station was also moving from a small space in the college's union building to a new building. The power boost, approved in August 1988 and completed in mid-1989, would increase the listening area from 1702 to 2402 square miles, with as many as 850,755 listeners. On October 1, 1988, WDAV began broadcasting 24 hours a day. That same month, the station became an affiliate of American Public Radio, with Radio Kronos and High Performance with André Previn.

On April 19, 1995, WDAV moved from a 350-foot tower two miles south of Cornelius to an 815-foot one in Huntersville, improving its signal in some areas and increasing its signal range to 22 counties. Also in 1995, WDAV ended Metropolitan Opera broadcasts because they had to be live and WDAV felt not enough listeners liked opera.

In July 2003, WDAV added the NPR program World of Opera, which ran until 2016.

Lightning damage in August 2012 resulted in a reduced signal for WDAV after the station had to switch to its old tower temporarily. The signal was back to normal in June 2013.

WDAV was one of the first classical radio stations to stream its signal.

In January 2015, after 20 years, WDAV decided to no longer run NPR news updates at the top of each hour, since listeners tended to change stations if they did not want news, and those who did want news listened to other stations. The size of the audience increased.

In August 2016, WDAV was the number one classical station in the country according to Nielsen Media Research. Half of listeners were over 55, but a fourth were less than 35 years old.

As of 2018, 21 percent of the audience was 18 to 34. The station had three podcasts already and planned two more.
