= James DePreist =

American conductor (1936–2013)

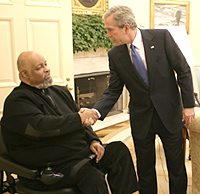
DePreist being congratulated by President George W. Bush after receiving the National Medal of Arts in 2005

James Anderson DePreist (November 21, 1936 – February 8, 2013) was an American conductor. DePreist was one of the first African-American conductors on the world stage. He was the director emeritus of conducting and orchestral studies at The Juilliard School and laureate music director of the Oregon Symphony at the time of his death.

== Early life and education ==
DePreist was born in Philadelphia in 1936. He was the nephew of contralto Marian Anderson. He was in the 202nd Class at Central High School, Philadelphia, graduating in June, 1954. DePreist studied composition with Vincent Persichetti at the Philadelphia Conservatory while earning a bachelor's degree at the Wharton School of the University of Pennsylvania and a master's degree from the Annenberg School for Communication at the University of Pennsylvania in 1958. On the side, he played percussion in a jazz quintet that performed on "The Tonight Show" with Steve Allen in 1956, and did enough composing to win a commission from the Philadelphia Dance Academy. That commission gave DePreist his first chance to conduct.

== Career ==
In 1962, the State Department sponsored a cultural exchange tour and engaged DePreist as an American specialist in music. The tour was to cover the Near and the Far East with DePreist lecturing and performing jazz. While on tour in Thailand and attending a Bangkok orchestra rehearsal, he was asked if he wanted to conduct. This experience caused DePreist to realize he wanted to be a conductor. During the tour DePreist contracted poliomyelitis. However he recovered sufficiently, allowing him to enter and to ultimately claim first prize in the Dimitri Mitropoulos International Conducting Competition. He was then chosen by Leonard Bernstein to become assistant conductor of the New York Philharmonic during the 1965–66 season. DePreist made his highly acclaimed European debut with the Rotterdam Philharmonic in 1969, then made appearances with other European orchestras in Amsterdam, Belgium, Berlin, Munich, Stockholm and Stuttgart. In 1971, Antal Doráti named him associate conductor of the National Symphony Orchestra in Washington, D.C. In 1976, DePreist was appointed music director of the Orchestre Symphonique de Québec, a position he held until 1983.

In 1980, DePreist was named music director of the Oregon Symphony, a position he held until 2003. During his 23-year tenure, he led the transformation of the Oregon Symphony from a small, part-time orchestra to a nationally recognized group with a number of recordings. Peter Frajola, a principal violinist who joined the orchestra in the 1980s recalled "phenomenal musical journeys" with DePreist whose influence reached far beyond the music hall into the community. He was the symphony's ninth music director and was succeeded by Carlos Kalmar.

His other leadership roles with orchestras include tenures with the Orchestre symphonique de Québec, the Malmö Symphony Orchestra in Sweden, and the Monte-Carlo Philharmonic Orchestra. He also served as artistic advisor to the Pasadena Symphony. As guest conductor, DePreist appeared with every major North American orchestra, including the Boston Symphony Orchestra, the Philadelphia Orchestra, the Symphony of the New World, and Juilliard Orchestra. He also led orchestras in Helsinki, Rome, Sydney, Tokyo, London, and many other cities.

DePreist made over 50 recordings, including several Shostakovich symphony recordings with the Helsinki Philharmonic Orchestra as well as 15 recordings with the Oregon Symphony, with such works as Sergei Rachmaninoff's Symphony No. 2.

== Awards ==
DePreist was awarded 15 honorary doctorates. He was an elected fellow of the American Academy of Arts and Sciences and the Royal Swedish Academy of Music (Kungl. Musikaliska Akademien). He was named the laureate music director for the Oregon Symphony. He is a recipient of the Insignia of Commander of the Order of the Lion of Finland, the Medal of the City of Québec and an officer of the Order of Cultural Merit of Monaco. He received the Ditson Conductor's Award in 2000 for his commitment to the performance of American music. In 2005, president George W. Bush presented him with the National Medal of Arts, the nation's highest honor for artistic excellence.

== In popular culture ==
During DePreist's stay in Japan as the permanent conductor of the Tokyo Metropolitan Symphony Orchestra, his name and likeness were used in the Japanese manga and anime, Nodame Cantabile, in which he was the musical director of the fictional Roux-Marlet Orchestra, and hired the series protagonist Shinichi Chiaki as the orchestra's new resident conductor. DePreist also conducted the Tokyo Metropolitan Symphony Orchestra to provide the music for both the anime and the live action drama.

In 1987, DePreist, who had been high school friends with Bill Cosby, was commissioned to rearrange the theme song to The Cosby Show.

DePreist appeared in the role of Lucy's shrink in the film New Year's Day, directed by the conductor's longtime friend, Henry Jaglom. The film was released in 1989.

== Personal life and death ==
He was married to Ginette DePreist. DePreist had two daughters, Tracy and Jennifer, from his first marriage to Betty Childress.

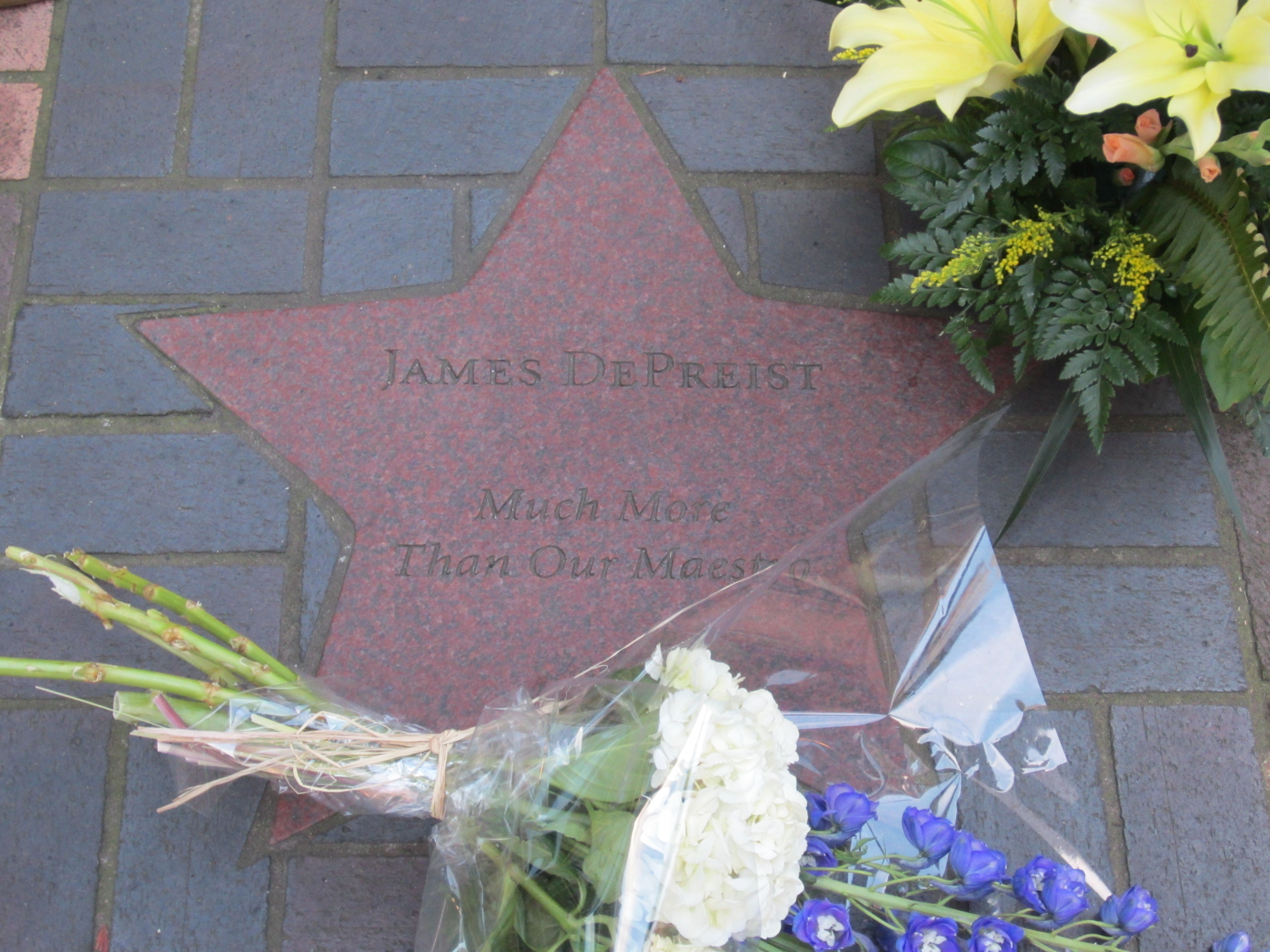
DePreist's star along Portland's Main Street Walk of Stars, showing floral tributes on the day of his death

In 2012, DePreist had a heart attack, from which he never fully recovered. He died on February 8, 2013, at the age of 76, in Scottsdale, Arizona and is interred at Eden Cemetery in Collingdale, Pennsylvania.

== Publications ==
DePreist published two books of poetry: The Precipice Garden (1987) and The Distant Siren (1989).

== See also ==
- Black conductors
- List of poliomyelitis survivors

Cultural offices
Preceded by Pierre Dervaux	Musical Director, Orchestre symphonique de Québec; 1976–1983	Succeeded by Simon Streatfeild
Preceded by Lawrence Leighton Smith	Music Director, Oregon Symphony; 1980–2003	Succeeded by Carlos Kalmar
Preceded by Vernon Handley	Chief Conductor, Malmö Symphony Orchestra; 1991–1994	Succeeded by Paavo Järvi
Preceded by Gary Bertini	Permanent Conductor, Tokyo Metropolitan Symphony Orchestra; 2005–2008	Succeeded by Eliahu Inbal (Principal Conductor)
