= Symphony No. 4 (Vaughan Williams) =

Symphony by Ralph Vaughan Williams

Vaughan Williams in 1922

Ralph Vaughan Williams composed his Symphony No. 4 between 1931 and 1935. Unlike his first three symphonies, it was not given a title: the composer said that it was to be understood as pure music, without any incidental or external inspiration. In contrast to many of Vaughan Williams's previous compositions, the symphony displays a severity of tone. It is in four movements, scored for a large orchestra.

The first performance was given at the Queen's Hall, London, on 10 April 1935; Adrian Boult conducted the BBC Symphony Orchestra. There have been many recordings of the symphony, beginning with one made two years after the premiere featuring the BBC orchestra conducted by the composer.

== Background ==
Towards the end of 1931 Vaughan Williams began work on a new symphony. His first (A Sea Symphony, 1910) had been for chorus and orchestra; his second (A London Symphony (1914) was purely orchestral; and his third (Pastoral Symphony, 1922) was for orchestra with solo singer. His widow, Ursula, wrote in her biography of him that the impetus to write a fourth came from an article in The Times. In August 1931 the paper carried a retrospect of the previous week’s festival of the International Society for Contemporary Music by its music critic, H. C. Colles. He wrote of modern symphonies by composers offering abstract music as a reaction against programme music:

They all rely on the same order of stimuli. The hearer is prodded into activity by dissonance, soothed by sentiment, overwhelmed by the power of a battering climax. The appeal is primarily sensuous, even though the composer makes play with formal processes of thematic development, such as fugato, basso ostinato or variations.

Colles added that possibly "the only thing to do is to make good music on an old principle". On reading the article, Vaughan Williams said, "il faut qui je compose cela" (I need to compose this). His three earlier symphonies had to a greater or lesser extent contained programmatic elements. For the fourth, the composer forwent any such content. Ursula Vaughan Williams wrote that he was "experimenting with purely musical ideas; no sea or city, no essence of the country was at the heart of this score". And she and the composer's biographer Michael Kennedy have both said that the symphony contains an element of self-portraiture: "Many of RVW’s friends recognised in it his outbursts of temper and his gusty humour and ribaldry".

Whilst Vaughan Williams was working on the symphony, his closest friend, Gustav Holst, died. Vaughan Williams had continually had support and advice from him whilst working on previous compositions and, in Ursula's words, "he felt the loss of that loving and critical mind more deeply than ever" whilst completing the new work. Support came from the composer Arnold Bax (dedicatee of the symphony), the teacher and composer R. O. Morris and the conductor Adrian Boult.

== Premiere and reception ==
Boult conducted the BBC Symphony Orchestra in the first performance, given at the Queen's Hall on 10 April 1935 and broadcast live by the BBC. The work was enthusiastically received: the music critic Richard Capell reported:

An immediate impression was made on the Queen's Hall audience by this original, terse and masterly composition. There was no doubting the genuineness of the response. It may be said that the audience was really carried away by the extraordinarily effective scherzo and the strange reckless finale.

Two of Vaughan Williams's younger colleagues, William Walton and Constant Lambert, are reported as calling the work "the greatest symphony since Beethoven". The London music critics were divided about the stature of the work. Neville Cardus commented that although Vaughan Williams had once been "one of our purest melodists, drawing his simple accents from English folk-tunes", he was now the opposite. "His new symphony, played superbly to-night by the BBC Orchestra under Dr Boult, has many admirable orchestral qualities, but a man might as well hang himself as look in the work for a great tune or theme". For Cardus, the symphony was the composer's most concentrated work but lacked the humanity of the London Symphony.

In The Times Colles said that the symphony "begins with excited harmonic gestures from which presently a great variety of tunes emerge" He called the slow movement "a lovely texture of wandering counterpoints" and said that the scherzo is "easily enjoyed by all and sundry at a first hearing, because it has humour which is sensitive in the opening theme and becomes broad when the tuba begins to caper in the Trio". For Capell the work as a whole "is probably not Vaughan Williams at his greatest, for it does not represent his contemplative depths. But it is one of his most vivid compositions, and the intentions are carried out with the point and strength of a master-hand". The anonymous reviewer in The Musical Times wrote:

[T]here can be no two opinions about the work. It is masterly. One has only to think of the average programme of contemporary music to feel how this symphony stands out among its kind. By those works you are bored, by this you are gripped. Those composers cudgel their brains for something to say in the new style. This composer knows what he wants to say and how to say it. He writes music that had to be as it is. Very rarely do we feel this sense of the inevitable – so familiar in the classics – when we listen to modern music. However the fact of its modernism be viewed, the modernism is never of the darksome, fourth-dimensional, understand-me-if-you-can order. It is daylight modernism, done with a clear brain and a sure hand.

During rehearsals, the composer himself said of the work: "I don't know whether I like it, but it's what I meant". He later wrote to a friend, "I am not at all sure that I like it myself now. All I know is that it is what I wanted to do at the time". He disclaimed attempts to interpret his music as a gloss on world events. The Fourth Symphony was being written whilst the Nazis were rising to power in Germany, and commentators including Hubert Foss and Frank Howes suggested that in Vaughan Williams's work "the prophet sees the nature of naked violence triumphant in Europe", in Howes's words. Boult wrote that the symphony "brought many of us straight up against the spectacle of war, and the ghastly possibility of it. A prophet, like other great men, he foresaw the whole thing ... and surely there is no more magnificent gesture of disgust in all music than that final open fifth when the composer seems to rid himself of the whole hideous idea. The composer would have none of this; he told a friend, "I wrote it not as a definite picture of anything external – e.g. the state of Europe – but simply because it occurred to me like this – I can't explain why". He later told the critic Olin Downes:

I don't think I like it any more than you do, but that does not mean I'm sorry I wrote it. I somehow had to at the time, for what reason I don't know; not certainly for the reasons given by some of my kind friends in the press: e.g., that it represented the turmoil of Europe at the moment or that I was trying to go one better than the mid-Europeans.

== Structure ==
The work is in four movements with the third and fourth linked:

1. Allegro
2. Andante moderato
3. Scherzo: Allegro molto
4. Finale con epilogo fugato: Allegro molto

A typical performance takes about 32 minutes.

Opening dissonance of the first movement: (Note: The composer Peggy Glanville-Hicks, a pupil of Vaughan Williams, later maintained that the opening bars of his symphony were taken from her Sinfonietta for Small Orchestra in D minor, but her biographer, Victoria Rogers, discounts the claim, as the sinfonietta postdates the symphony.)

Germinal motive that develops out of the opening dissonance:

Motive built of fourths (measure 14–15):

== Instrumentation ==
The symphony is scored for a large orchestra including: 2 or 3 flutes (2nd doubling on piccolo), 2 or 3 oboes (2nd doubling on cor anglais), 2 clarinets (in B♭), bass clarinet (in B♭) (ad lib.), 2 bassoons, contrabassoon (ad lib.), 4 horns (in F), 2 trumpets (in C), 3 trombones, tuba, percussion (timpani, triangle, side drum, cymbals, bass drum), and strings.

== Later performances, publication and manuscript ==
The American premiere was given on 19 December 1935 by the Cleveland Orchestra conducted by Artur Rodziński. The German premiere was on 8 January 1936 in Munich, conducted by Boult. The Australian premiere was in Sydney on 6 July 1937, conducted by Malcolm Sargent. The symphony was not performed in Canada until 2013; Bramwell Tovey conducted.

The Oxford University Press published the score in 1935. A grant from the Vaughan Williams Trust enabled the Department of Manuscripts of what is now the British Library to purchase the autograph full score of the symphony in 1960. The only autograph manuscript music by Vaughan Williams hitherto preserved in the department's own collections was the Concerto Accademico for violin and string orchestra of 1925, although the department also held the autograph full score of the Sinfonia Antartica on indefinite loan from the Royal Philharmonic Society. The manuscript of the F minor symphony contains several passages later discarded and numerous corrections by the composer.

== Recordings ==
The first recording, made two years after the premiere, featured the composer himself conducting the BBC Symphony Orchestra in what proved to be his only commercial recording of any of his symphonies. It was released on 78-rpm discs in the UK by His Master's Voice and in the US by RCA Victor, and has been reissued on LP and CD. In his 1972 study of Vaughan Williams's symphonies, Hugh Ottaway wrote that "for sheer ferocity" the composer's own recording remained unsurpassed.

Conductor	Orchestra	Year	Ref
Ralph Vaughan Williams	BBC Symphony	1937	
Sir Adrian Boult	NBC Symphony	1938	
Leopold Stokowski	NBC Symphony	1943	
Sir John Barbirolli	BBC Symphony	1950	
Dimitri Mitropoulos	New York Philharmonic	1953	
Sir Adrian Boult	London Philharmonic	1953	
Dimitri Mitropoulos	New York Philharmonic	1956	
Sir Malcolm Sargent	BBC Symphony	1963	
Leonard Bernstein	New York Philharmonic	1965	
Sir Adrian Boult	New Philharmonia	1968	
André Previn	London Symphony	1969	
Norman Del Mar	BBC Scottish Symphony	1973	
Colin Davis	Boston Symphony	1973	
Paavo Berglund	Royal Philharmonic	1979	
Bryden Thomson	London Symphony	1987	
Gennady Rozhdestvensky	USSR State Symphony	1988	
Vernon Handley	Royal Liverpool Philharmonic	1991	
Leonard Slatkin	Philharmonia	1991	
Andrew Davis	BBC Symphony	1992	
Bernard Haitink	London Philharmonic	1996	
Roger Norrington	London Philharmonic	1997	
Richard Hickox	London Symphony	2001	
Paul Daniel	Bournemouth Symphony	2003	
Leon Botstein	American Symphony	2006	
Sir Colin Davis	London Symphony	2008	
Peter Oundjian	Toronto Symphony	2011	
Carlos Kalmar	Oregon Symphony	2011	
Mark Wigglesworth	London Philharmonic	2013	
Robert Spano	Atlanta Symphony	2014	
Sir Mark Elder	Hallé	2016	
Andrew Manze	Royal Liverpool Philharmonic	2016	
Sir Antonio Pappano	London Symphony	2020	

== Notes, references and sources ==
=== Sources ===
- Foss, Hubert (1950). Ralph Vaughan Williams: A Study. London: Harrap. OCLC 1057594846.
- Heffer, Simon (2001). Vaughan Williams. London: Phoenix. ISBN 0-75381-124-3.
- Howes, Frank (1954). The Music of Ralph Vaughan Williams. London: Oxford University Press. OCLC 246382883.
- Kennedy, Michael (1964). The Works of Ralph Vaughan Williams. Oxford and New York: Oxford University Press. OCLC 1391898453.
- Lloyd, Stephen (2001). William Walton: Muse of Fire. Woodbridge: Boydell Press. ISBN 0-85115-803-X.
- Ottaway, Hugh (1972). Vaughan Williams Symphonies. London: British Broadcasting Corporation. OCLC 34112907.
- Rogers, Victoria (1988). The Music of Peggy Glanville Hicks. Farnham: Ashgate. ISBN 978-0-75-466635-6.
- Vaughan Williams, Ursula (1964). RVW: A Biography of Ralph Vaughan Williams. Oxford: Oxford University Press. ISBN 978-0-19-315411-7.
