= A Jazz Symphony =

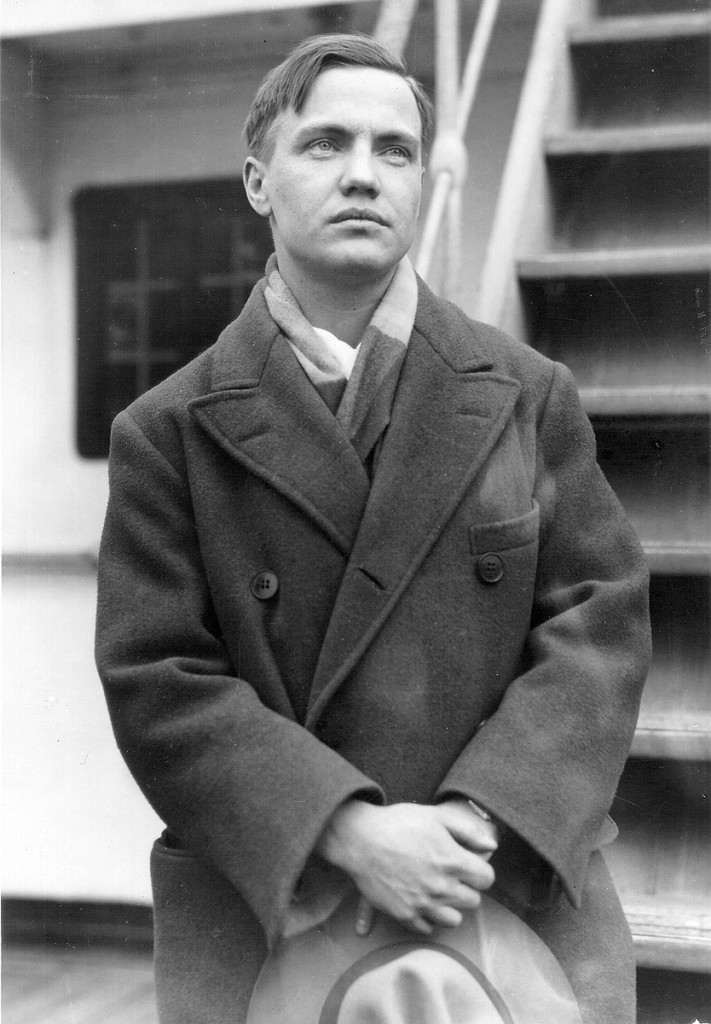
George Antheil arriving in New York in 1927

A Jazz Symphony is a jazz-influenced classical work by avant-garde composer George Antheil.

Written in 1925, it was premiered at his infamous 1927 Carnegie Hall Concert which also debuted the succès de scandale Ballet Mécanique. It was originally intended to be used in Paul Whiteman's Experiment in Modern Music (which famously premiered George Gershwin's Rhapsody in Blue) concerts, but was deemed too radical.

The original version was scored for a large orchestra. For convenience, Antheil reorchestrated the work in 1955 for a much more conservative ensemble, a version which also rids itself of the many dissonances and noises of the original.

It was performed by the Harlem Symphonietta conducted by W.C. Handy, and was praised by Gershwin and Aaron Copland. Despite this critical success, it was overshadowed by the spectacle of the main work, Ballet Mécanique. The work can be seen with Gershwin's Rhapsody in Blue and Darius Milhaud's La création du monde as one of the first classical works with a successful and overt jazz influence. Furthermore, while Gershwin's piece is more influenced by big band and swing, Milhaud's and Antheil's works can be seen as reinterpretations of the large freeness of Creole and New Orleans and cutting-edge New York jazz.

== Instrumentation ==
The 1925 version calls for a large orchestra consisting of the following instruments:

Woodwinds
2 oboes
2 clarinets in B♭
soprano saxophone in B♭
alto saxophone in E♭
tenor saxophone in B♭

Brass
3 trumpets in C
3 trombones
tuba

Percussion
xylophone
glockenspiel
steamboat whistle
drum set

Keyboards
3 pianos (piano I solo)

Strings
2 banjos (2nd optionally doubling guitar)
string section

In contrast the 1955 version calls for a much smaller ensemble:

Woodwinds
1 flute
3 clarinets

Brass
3 trumpets
3 trombones

Percussion
timpani
drum set
xylophone
glockenspiel

Keyboards
piano

Strings
2 violins I
1 violin II
viola
cello
double bass
