= The Incredible Flutist =

The Incredible Flutist is a ballet composed by Walter Piston in 1938, his only composition for the stage. The ballet received its premiere by the Boston Pops under Arthur Fiedler on May 30 of that year. The libretto, written by Piston and Hans Wiener, describes a marketplace teeming with activity and enlivened by a circus. A flutist acts as a snake charmer and also charms women. A rich widow flirts with a merchant, is discovered by her lover, faints, and is revived by the flutist's music. The circus then leaves the square.

Piston extracted an orchestral suite from the ballet, which was premiered on November 22, 1940, by the Pittsburgh Symphony under Fritz Reiner. The suite is in thirteen movements:

- Introduction
- "Siesta Hour in the Marketplace and Entrance of the Vendors"
- "Dance of the Vendors"
- "Entrance of the Customers"
- "Tango of the Four Daughters"
- "Arrival of Circus and Circus March"
- "Solo of the Flutist"
- Minuet – "Dance of the Widow and Merchant"
- "Spanish Waltz"
- "Eight O'Clock Strikes"
- Siciliano – "Dance of the Flutist and the Merchant's Daughter"
- Polka
- Finale

Elliott Carter commented on how Piston avoided the use of a particular musical geographic "pastiche" style in the music, which could have made the setting specific to one geography, and noted that the village can be "any village" in this setting.

== Sources ==
- David Ewen, Encyclopedia of Concert Music. New York; Hill and Wang, 1959.
