= 20th-century music =

Overview of music during the 20th century

The following Wikipedia articles deal with 20th-century music.

== Western art music ==
=== Main articles ===
- 20th-century classical music
- Contemporary classical music, covering the period c. 1970–2000

=== Sub-topics ===
- Aleatoric music
- Electronic music
- Experimental music
- Expressionist music
- Microtonal music
- Minimal music
- Modernism (music)
- Neoclassical music
- Modern opera
- Twelve-tone technique (dodecaphonic music)

== Folk music ==
- Bluegrass music
- Contemporary folk music
- Roots revival
- World music

== Popular music ==
=== Main article ===
- Popular music

=== African popular music ===
- African popular music

=== Popular music in Asia ===
==== India ====
- Indian pop

==== Japan ====
- Japanese popular music

=== Popular music in Latin America ===
- Music of Latin America

== By historical period ==
- Music in World War II
- Music in the movement against apartheid

== See also ==
- Sound recording and reproduction
