= Carlos Kalmar =

Uruguayan conductor (born 1958)

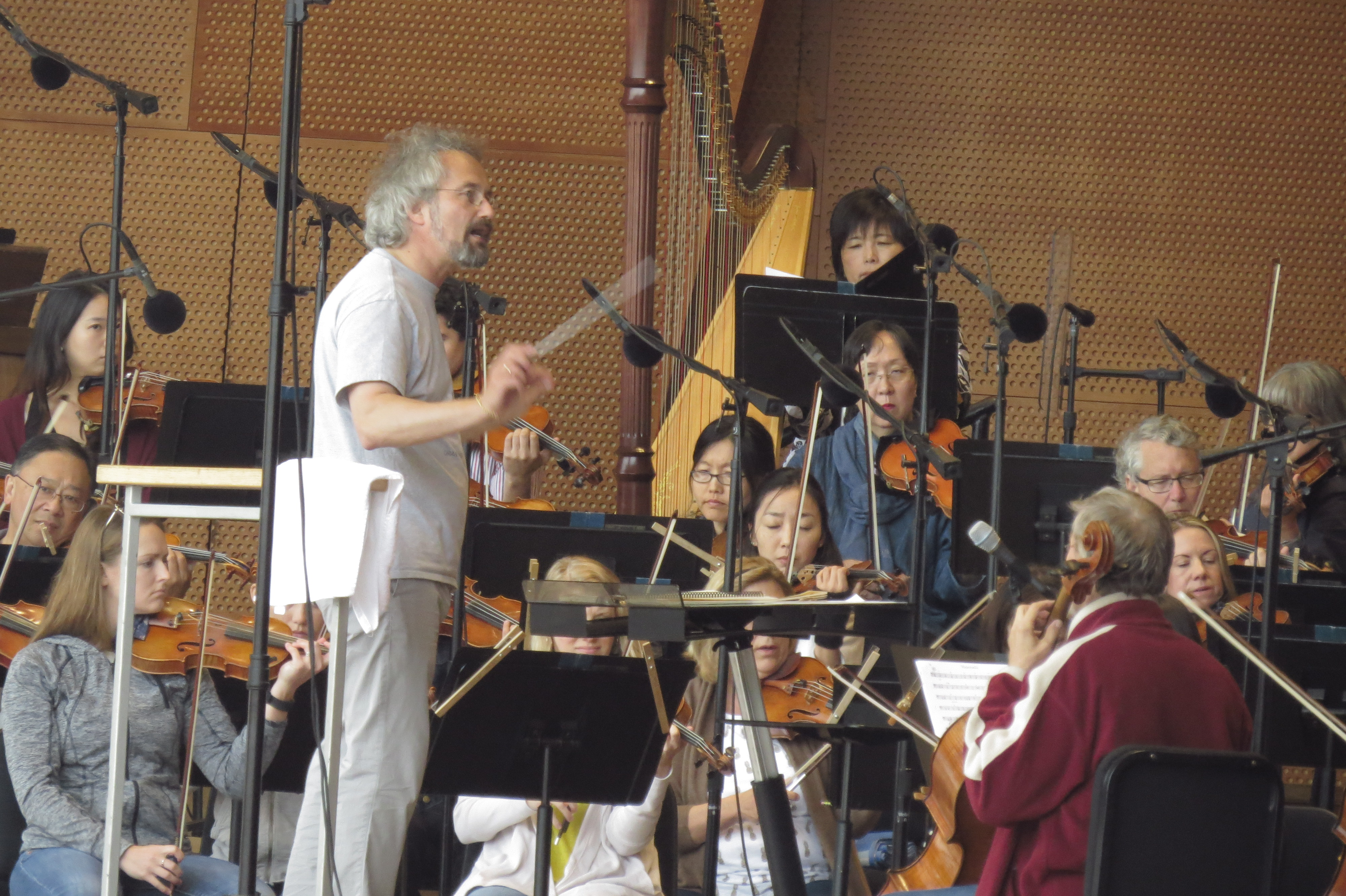
- Carlos Kalmar, shown here rehearsing with the Grant Park Festival orchestra in Chicago.

Background information
- Born: February 26, 1958 (age 68); Montevideo, Uruguay
- Occupations: Conductor

Carlos Kalmar (born February 26, 1958, in Montevideo) is a Uruguayan conductor.

== Biography ==
Born to Jewish immigrant parents from Austria, Kalmar began violin studies at age six. At age fifteen, he enrolled at the Vienna Academy of Music where his conducting teacher was Karl Österreicher. In 1984, he won first prize in the Hans Swarowsky Conducting Competition in Vienna. Kalmar has been music director of the Hamburger Symphoniker (1987–91), the Stuttgart Philharmonic (1991–95), and the Anhaltisches Theater in Dessau. He was principal conductor of the Tonkünstlerorchester, Vienna, from 2000 to 2003.

In the USA, Kalmar was principal conductor of the Grant Park Music Festival in Chicago from 2000 to 2024. He was music director of the Oregon Symphony from 2003 to 2021.

In May 2021, the Cleveland Institute of Music (CIM) announced the appointment of Kalmar as its next director of orchestral studies, effective 1 July 2021. In May 2023, investigation began into alleged Title IX violations by Kalmar at CIM. These allegations were dismissed in August 2023, and the conductor has taken legal action against CIM for damage to his reputation.

Kalmar currently lives in Shaker Heights, Ohio. He had two sons with his second wife, Raffaela, a violinist and nurse. In September 2026, Raffaela filed for divorce.

He was 3 times a nominee to the Grammy Award for Best Orchestral Performance.

== Recordings ==
- Music for a Time of War. Works by Charles Ives, John Adams, Benjamin Britten, Ralph Vaughan Williams. The Oregon Symphony. PENTATONE PTC 5186393 (2011)
- This England. Works by Edward Elgar, Ralph Vaughan Williams, Benjamin Britten. The Oregon Symphony. PENTATONE PTC 5186471 (2012)
- Spirit of the American Range. Works by George Antheil, Walter Piston, Aaron Copland. The Oregon Symphony. PENTATONE PTC 5186481 (2015)
- Haydn Symphonies. Carlos Kalmar, Oregon Symphony Orchestra. PENTATONE PTC 5186612 (2017)
- Aspects of America. Carlos Kalmar, Oregon Symphony Orchestra. PENTATONE PTC 5186727 (2018)

== Notes ==
Cultural offices
Preceded by Heribert Beissel	Chief Conductor, Hamburg Symphony Orchestra; 1987–1991	Succeeded by Miguel Gómez-Martinez
Preceded by Wolf-Dieter Hauschild	Chief Conductor, Stuttgart Philharmonic Orchestra; 1991−1995	Succeeded by Jörg-Peter Weigle
Preceded by Hugh Wolff	Artistic Director and Principal Conductor, Grant Park Music Festival; 2000−2024	Succeeded by Giancarlo Guerrero
