= Blanton Alspaugh =

American record producer (born 1959)

- Education: Rice University
- Occupation: Record producer

Blanton Alspaugh (born 1959) is an American record producer, specialised in classical recordings. He has so far (the 64th Grammy Awards season) won 11 Grammy Awards.

Alspaugh earned a bachelor's of science degree in music education from Tennessee Technological University and a master's degree in orchestral conducting from Rice University. He has been a member of the Soundmirror classical music recording and production team since 1999.

He has worked with a variety of orchestras and musicians, including Detroit Symphony Orchestra, Los Angeles Opera Orchestra, the Harrington String Quartet, William Boggs, Stanislav Pronin and Emmanuel Feldman.

Alspaugh won his first Grammy in 2009 for Best Small Ensemble Performance for Spotless Rose: Hymns to the Virgin Mary.
