= Ferdinand Sorenson =

Ferdinand Sorenson (1882–1966) was a prominent music educator in the U.S. state of Oregon as well as a conductor, composer, dance instructor and performer. Originally from Grenaa (Djursland), Denmark, Sorenson came to the United States as an infant with his parents, Lars and Matilda Sorenson.

Sorenson's music education began with his father, Lars, when he was five years old. At an early age Sorenson played the violin and brass instruments to join in family and community orchestras. When Sorenson went to Salt Lake City in 1898, he continued his violin studies with Willard Weihe. In Salt Lake City, Sorenson played in his first symphony and opera orchestras and met his friend and mentor in music and dancing, Mose Christensen.

In 1905, Mose Christensen and his group of musicians in Boise, Idaho helped Sorenson collect enough money to travel to New York, where he studied cello with William Ebann at the New York College of Music. In New York City Sorenson played the cello in the orchestra of Walter Damrosch and in shows starring David Warfield and silent film star Alla Nazimova.

When he returned to the West, Sorenson played briefly in the Boise Symphony Orchestra (1908) under Mose Christensen's direction and was briefly principal cellist in the Portland Symphony Orchestra under David Rosebrook (1909). Sorenson married in 1909 and moved to Spokane, Washington in 1910. Sorenson taught music, dancing and conducted a theater orchestra in Spokane. Besides playing in the Spokane Symphony he also played in the Gesner-Sorenson String Quartet, the Gottfried Herbst String Quartet, the Spokane Citizen's Band and the Chuck Whitehead Orchestra.

In 1919, Chuck Whitehead built his own dance hall in Spokane, the Whitehead Dancing Palace, where Sorenson started his dancing school after having graduated from Mose Christensen's dance school in Portland, Oregon. Sorenson moved back to Portland in 1924.

In Portland, Sorenson began playing in the Portland Symphony again when Willem van Hoogstraten began as conductor of the orchestra. Other groups he played in were the Ashley Cook Band, the McDougall Concert Band, the Ted Bacon String Orchestra, Kelly's Restaurant Orchestra and the Gershkovitch Symphony Orchestra. He also played in the KGW, KOIN and other radio orchestras over the years. Sorenson also conducted the Sorenson Concert Orchestra and the Inter-Community Orchestra in Longview, Washington.

With Sorenson's numerous string and brass students and extensive teaching experience he was able to assist Mary Dodge, Jacques Gershkovitch and others in developing the Portland Junior Symphony. Besides his private students, Sorenson taught over the years as an adjunct professor at Pacific University, Lewis and Clark College, Portland State College (now Portland State University), and the University of Oregon. He conducted the student orchestra at Marylhurst University and the student band at Pacific University. Sorenson was still teaching privately and at Portland State College when he died in December 1966 at the age of 84.
