= Earnest Andersson =

American polymath (1878–1943)

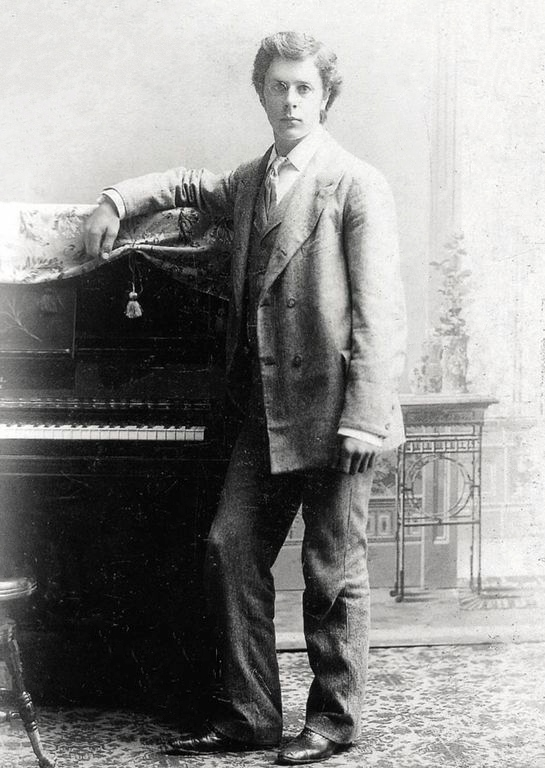
- Andersson in his youth, c. 1896
- Born: Ernest DeNeen Anderson; February 10, 1878; Burr Oak, Iowa, US
- Died: June 23, 1943 (aged 65); Santa Monica, California, US
- Resting place: Lakewood Cemetery, Minneapolis, Minnesota, US
- Occupations: Composer; inventor; businessman
- Years active: 1895–1943
- Spouses: Mary Marguerite Mead (m. 1903; died 1912) Dorothy Farnum (m. 1917; div. 1921)
- Partner: Dona Drake c. early 1940s
- Children: 2
- Relatives: James Sample (son-in-law)

Earnest Andersson (Note: His professional name.) (born Ernest DeNeen Anderson; February 10, 1878 – June 23, 1943) was an American polymath born to a Swedish immigrant father in Iowa. Childhood illness prevented him from attaining formal schooling beyond the fifth grade. Andersson, a highly precocious child, nevertheless became skilled as a composer, inventor, and painter through a combination of home schooling and auto-didacticism.

After dithering over which field to pursue, he chose to become an inventor and moved to New York City to find work. Andersson soon became financially successful; by the end of the 1920s, the patents he was granted for various packaging machines he invented had made him a millionaire. He also became an accomplished amateur athlete, race car driver, pilot, photographer, and radio operator. His wealth connected him to influential artists, including those that he met at the Hotel des Artistes, which he had devised and where he also kept a residence. Although he was affected by the consequences of the Wall Street Crash of 1929, financial decisions he had made allowed him to bear the period without excessive detriment. After a brief residence in Florida, where he became a professional golfer, he settled in Hollywood, California, where he gained attention for the quality of his amateur photography of local film stars.

Throughout his life, Andersson maintained his interest in music. After he moved to California, he rededicated himself to composition, and hired various teachers to help improve his skills. The last of these was Igor Stravinsky, with whom he studied regularly from 1941 to 1943. Stravinsky and his wife, Vera, were grateful to Andersson for the income he provided. In turn, Andersson took on roles in their household as handyman, secretary, and friend. He died in Santa Monica, California, in 1943.

Most of Andersson's personal effects, including musical manuscripts, were destroyed in a fire after his death. In the early 21st century, some of his belongings, including his notebook detailing his lessons with Stravinsky, were discovered in the possession of a private collector. Although critical reception of Andersson's music was mostly positive during his lifetime, posthumous appraisals—including by Stravinsky, who had formerly been a supporter—have been negative. James Sample, who said Stravinsky's later statements were borne from envy for his student's facility, considered Andersson a superior composer to Charles Ives.

== Biography ==
=== Early years ===
Andersson was born Ernest DeNeen Anderson in Burr Oak, Iowa, on February 10, 1878, at his family's home, known locally as "The Red Barn". He was the third of five children born to Lavina (née Nichols) and Andrew Edward Anderson (baptized Anders Edvard Andersson), an inventor of farm equipment who had immigrated from Ödeshög, Sweden. This Swedish heritage was a source of pride for Andersson his entire life. His family moved to Grand Forks, North Dakota, in 1882, then settled permanently in Minneapolis, Minnesota, at the end of the 1880s.

Poor health prevented Andersson from attaining any formal education beyond the fifth-grade. Nevertheless, he was considered an intellectually precocious child. Aside from being home-schooled sporadically by his parents, Andersson also taught himself. He reputedly memorized the English dictionary, among his youthful accomplishments. In his childhood, he studied piano, violin, and also played the tenor horn in a children's band in North Dakota. He began to compose music in 1895, by which point he believed his development had reached a level comparable to those of the composers he admired most. On September 3, he wrote to his father:

If I am ever able to compose (hoping the time will soon come), I would like to have the grandness of Wagner, the deepness of Beethoven, the smoothness of Chopin, the clearness of Haydn, the religiousness of Handel, to sing as beautiful a song in notes as Mendelsshon [sic] did, and to have a soul [to] reign over all.

The letter ends with a quote from a remark that Henry Wadsworth Longfellow had made to his father: "I am almost confident in believing that if I can rise in the world, it must be by the exercise of my talent". Andersson added that the statement could just as well apply to him and his music. Despite his stated resolve, he was unsure of whether to devote himself to becoming a composer, painter, or inventor.

The first recorded instance of a public performance of Andersson's music occurred in 1899 at the Minneapolis Unitarian Church, when his Three Sketches for Opera were played as part of a program that included music by Franz Liszt and Camille Saint-Saëns.

=== New York ===
In 1901, Andersson's grandfather died, which resulted in a modest inheritance. He decided to pursue a career as an inventor and moved to New York City in order to find a market for his work. Professional success followed. Between 1916 and 1924, Andersson applied for and was granted patents for packaging machines used for numerous products that were household names for much of the 20th century. Among his clients were the American Chicle Company, Colgate, French's, Life Savers, and Vicks. A list compiled in June 1926 included seventy-one companies as clients. By 1929, he was a millionaire and the owner of several properties.

Andersson was on the board of directors of the Bankers Securities Corporation. He was also a board member of the Hotel des Artistes, whose concept he had originally created. He kept a duplex apartment there as one of his residences and, over the next decade, subsequently purchased several more.

During this period, Andersson was also successful as an amateur athlete, race car driver, pilot, photographer, and radio operator. He also maintained his interest in music. At his apartment in the Hotel des Artistes he installed a Choralcelo, an early electric organ with two keyboards that occupied a space of two stories, and had cost him US$50,000 (equivalent to $939,320 in 2025). The New York Evening Telegram reported in 1921 that Andersson often played the Choralcelo at home and that he found "true expression of self in music". His pastime was lampooned in a cartoon by Billy DeBeck published in 1924.

The Wall Street Crash of 1929 had significant consequences for Andersson, who was obliged to sell two of his factories. Financial decisions he made for the sake of his family's prosperity, however, allowed him to retire to Florida for a time. While resident there, he became a professional golfer.

In 1930, his daughter from his first marriage married James Sample, who became a decisive figure in Andersson's musical career.

=== Hollywood ===
Andersson moved to Hollywood, California, in April 1933 and established himself in a mansion located in the Outpost Estates neighborhood. With his finances fully recovered, he founded a new company in March 1936 in order to pursue his interests in cartooning and photography. He garnered a favorable reputation for his skill in the latter field. His Leica portraits of Jean Harlow and Johnnie Weissmuller were published in national magazines. He later also photographed Gary Cooper, Bing Crosby, W. C. Fields, Laurel and Hardy, Jeanette MacDonald, Adolphe Menjou, Will Rogers, and Rudy Vallee.

=== Return to composition ===
While Andersson was on a trip to San Francisco in April 1936, his piano improvisations caught the attention of Pierre Monteux, who was Sample's conducting teacher at the time. Intrigued by his music, Monteux suggested its orchestration, which he offered to play in the next season of the San Francisco Symphony Orchestra. Over the next few weeks, Andersson developed these improvisations into a 30-minute symphony. Upon its completion on May 15, he began to orchestrate the music, but by July complained that it was an "arduous task". Although Monteux assisted in the orchestration with Sample, he ultimately reneged on his proposal. The score for the symphony was later lost.

Subsequently in 1938, Andersson joined the Composers' Forum of Los Angeles, a Federal Music Project–sponsored group. He also began lessons in orchestration with Max Donner, a local composer, as well as the second violinist of the Los Angeles Philharmonic, and conductor of the local WPA Federal Symphony Orchestra. As his lessons progressed, Andersson worked on a four-movement orchestral suite entitled The Sun Worshipper. Each movement was premiered by the Los Angeles WPA Federal Symphony Orchestra between 1937 and 1939. The music, particularly its orchestration, elicited positive responses from the public and press.

Sample arrived in Los Angeles in 1938 with his wife and began his conducting career. That same year, Andersson purchased a house for the couple in the Beverly Glen neighborhood. When they were away on trips, Andersson would stay in it. He also rented the home out to movie stars. Another home he purchased in 1940, located within what is today West Hollywood, was rented by Robert Mitchum.

In mid-1940, Andersson discontinued lessons with Donner, choosing instead to study with Daniele Amfitheatrof, after having been impressed with a performance of his American Panorama. Soon after, he chose to continue lessons with Sample instead.

=== Stravinsky ===
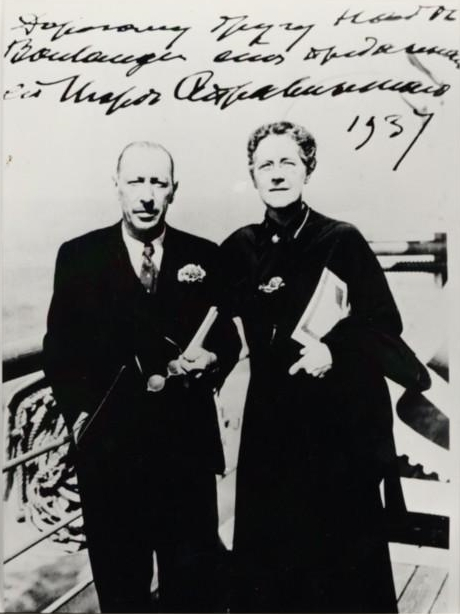
Igor Stravinsky with Nadia Boulanger, 1937

As a patron of the New York Philharmonic-Symphony Orchestra, Andersson may have been in the audience or had heard about Igor Stravinsky's American debut in 1925. In 1935, he had attended Stravinsky's first concert in Los Angeles, as well as subsequent concerts in 1937 at the Shrine Auditorium, and in 1940 at the Hollywood Bowl. The latter concluded with a staging of the suite from The Firebird choreographed by Adolph Bolm, a common friend that Andersson had met at the Hotel des Artistes.

According to Robert Craft, Stravinsky's amanuensis and confidant, Andersson first made contact with the composer in 1941 at the Hotel des Artistes. Hoping to become Stravinsky's student, Andersson enlisted Sol Hurok to propose the idea to the composer and negotiate a contract for private lessons at US$25 (equivalent to $547.23 in 2025) apiece. H. Colin Slim said that Andersson met Stravinsky in Hollywood on February 19, 1941, after the former had returned with his partner from a trip to Palm Springs. After meeting with the composer and his wife, Vera, he offered to let them live at one of his homes, an offer which the couple initially accepted, but later refused. Despite Stravinsky's stated dislike for teaching, he accepted Andersson as a pupil on February 21. Hearing the news, Sample told him that he "would never mind losing a pupil to Stravinsky!"

Because of disruptions to his royalties caused by World War II and a lack of demand for his music in the United States, Stravinsky's financial situation was strained. His wife recorded in her diary that it was a source of profound worry for him. Andersson was Stravinsky's only source of income in 1941. Even so, Vera noted in her diary in March that the money allowed them to purchase furniture and other household necessities. Within the span of a few months, Stravinsky's earnings from teaching Andersson were comparable to his total income as conductor in 1942. By April 1941, he was able to purchase a home on North Wetherley Drive, above the Sunset Strip. When the year ended, Stravinsky had given Andersson a total of 134 lessons; in 1942 the total was 215. Often, their sessions went beyond the hour that they had previously agreed upon.

In the course of his lessons, Andersson became one of the Stravinskys' most frequent visitors, as well as a friend; their only American-born one at the time. He was among the invitees to their first party in the United States. On his birthday in 1942, Vera gifted him a linen tea towel that she had personally embroidered with a dedicatory message. Vera, whose mother was a Swede, taught Andersson Swedish.

Aside from taking lessons, he also made a series of forty photographic studies of Stravinsky on July 1, 1941. The photographs documented Stravinsky making corrections in the score of the second movement of Andersson's Futurama Symphony—one of the rare instances he permitted anyone to watch him at work. Stravinsky presented a manuscript copy of his Tango to Andersson, which he also played for him.

As reciprocal gestures of kindness, Andersson offered his services to the Stravinskys as handyman, secretary, and gofer. When a feud erupted between José Iturbi and Benny Goodman in June 1941 over a scheduled performance by the latter of Stravinsky's Tango, Andersson mediated a resolution on the composer's behalf. Additionally, he paid the taxes on the Stravinskys' home in December.

=== Late recognition ===
Scheduling conflicts between Andersson and Stravinsky resulted in no lessons in 1943. The former headed to Salt Lake City in March to hear excerpts from The Sun-Worshipper and Dreams of Solfomby Francinsadit played by the Utah State Symphony Orchestra conducted by Sample. In the days preceding the concert, the Salt Lake Telegram referred to Andersson as "America's foremost living composer of music". The program also included works by Marcel Poot, Eugene Zador, and Edward MacDowell; the latter in arrangements by Lionel Barrymore. The Deseret News reported that Andersson's music was greeted with a "storm of applause" and that the composer was called to the stage to take a bow.

On May 1, the New York College of Music conferred upon Andersson an honoris causa doctorate in music.

=== Death ===
On June 23, 1943, Andersson had a medical emergency at the Samples' home in Beverly Glen. He was transported to Santa Monica Hospital, where he died later that day. No autopsy was performed. Memorial services were held on June 30 at W. M. Strothers Funeral Parlors in Hollywood, followed by cremation at Hollywood Memorial Park Crematory. He was buried at Lakewood Cemetery in Minneapolis.

Stravinsky was visibly distressed by Andersson's death. "All this is very sad", he later wrote to his son, Soulima, "and just shows I shouldn't teach".

== Destruction of personal documents ==
Most of Andersson's papers were kept at the property he purchased for the Samples in Beverly Glen. A few years after his death, the property and its contents, including most of his unpublished musical manuscripts, were destroyed in a fire.

Investigations in the early 21st century turned up an anonymous collector in Pennsylvania who possessed some of Andersson's personal documents, including the manuscript of his Futurama Symphony with his teacher's revisions. His notebook from the time of his study with Stravinsky, the only extended documentation of his teachings, was also among this collector's holdings.

== Personal life ==
In 1903, Andersson married Mary Marguerite Mead, a painter he had met at the Minneapolis Institute of Art. They had one daughter, Ernestine Frances. Mead died in 1912. In 1917, he married his second wife, Dorothy Farnum, with whom he had a second daughter, DeNeen. The marriage ended in divorce around 1921, by which time Farnum had become a well-known screenwriter for silent films.

Dona Drake was reported to be his partner in early 1941. She later was a tenant at one of his properties.

== Music ==
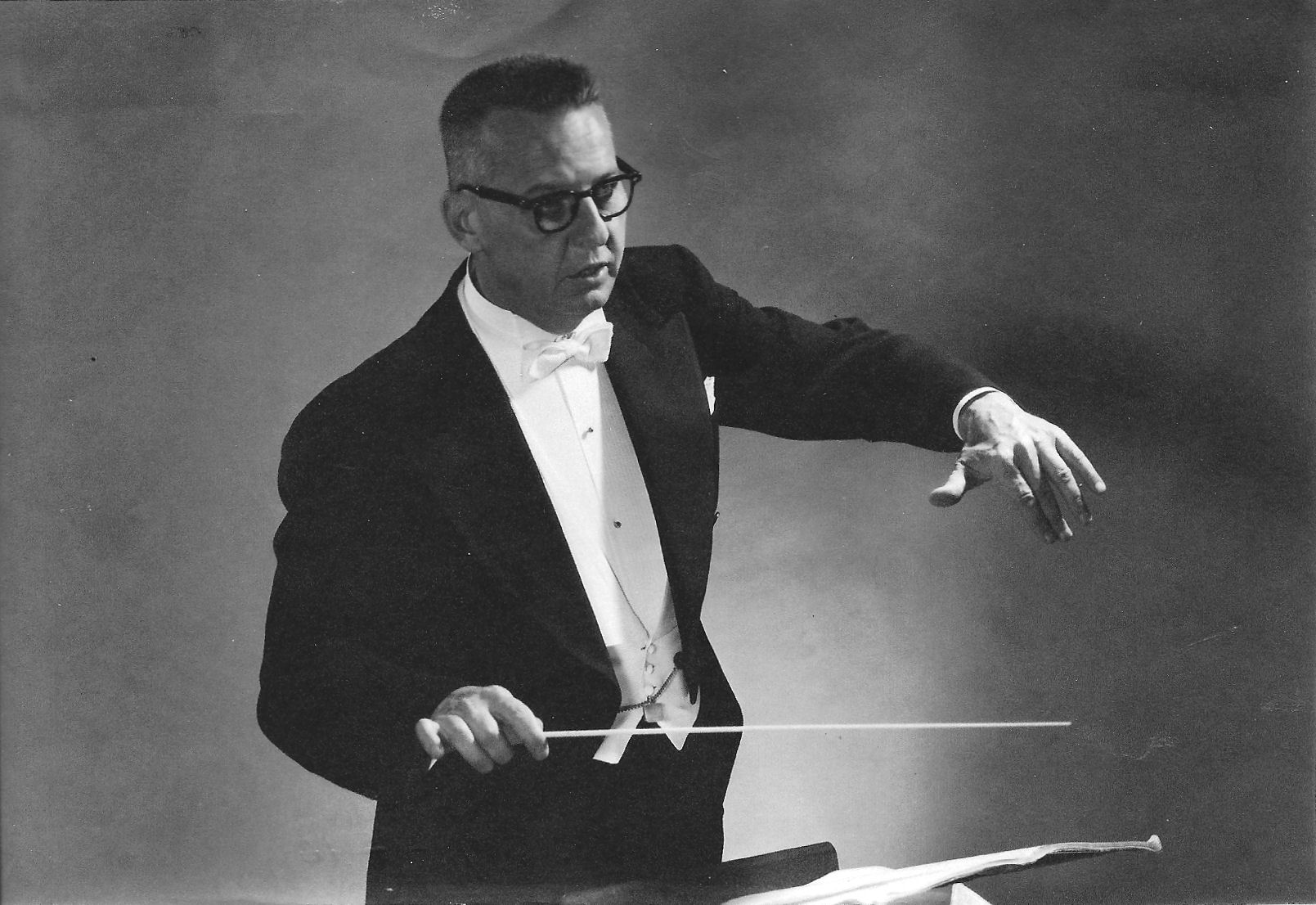
Andersson was championed by his son-in law, James Sample

=== Reception ===
Posthumous appraisals of Andersson as a composer have been negative. Craft in 2013 dismissed the Futurama Symphony as "disappointing". Stravinsky, at an afternoon symposium devoted to his music at the Eastman School of Music in 1966, responded to an inquiry from Walter Hendl about teaching. In a reply wherein he reaffirmed his dislike of teaching, he mentioned his experience with Andersson:

And I said [in response to his desire for composition lessons], a long time you are started [sic] to compose? And he said, oh, I compose all my life. Also, show me please and he showed me [his music] and it was a very, very idiotic music, and I said [to myself] what can I do? I must be polite and I cannot say "idiotic" to him. But you know, it was very, very embarrassing and finally I said, good, you call it symphony. Bring me this symphony [Futurama] and we will compose it together ... And we composed together and it means I composed it—with his themes. And some years later he died. And his son-in-law [Sample] or his daughter, his daughter [Ernestine] which [sic] I know—very nice people—they said we treasure this thing because it is your composition.

Stravinsky's claims of having largely authored the Futurama Symphony are refuted by the extant manuscript score and Andersson's notebook, both of which confirm that he only assisted in its revision. Although in 1966 Stravinsky gave a very unfavorable opinion of Andersson's worth as a composer, in 1942 he had urged John Barbirolli, Serge Koussevitzky, Dimitri Mitropoulos, and Frederick Stock to conduct the Futurama Symphony. To Mitropoulos he said that he could personally "attest to its good musical value". None of these conductors ever performed Andersson's music, an outcome which may have resulted from the composer's untimely death.

Slim and Sample both said that Stravinsky's rejection of Andersson's talent was borne from envy, particularly at his thematic facility. The latter stated in a 1972 interview that Stravinsky was "always, I think, almost jealous of [Andersson's] melodic and rhythmic ideas because they were hard to come by for [him]". Sample recalled another occasion when Stravinsky expressed his approval of a "marvelous theme, a motive, a wonderful melody" that Andersson had composed. He was fascinated by how Andersson had based the theme on the tones of a word he had discovered in a Chinese dictionary.

Reception to Andersson's music was more positive during his lifetime. Richard D. Saunders, music critic for the Los Angeles Evening Citizen News, reported that the "Nocturne" movement from the Futurama Symphony was well-received. He described the music as "a work of impressionistic character, subtly written, and with inherent feeling for orchestral color and pliability of mood". Similarly, Isabel Morse Jones of the Los Angeles Times called the same work "vague and atmospheric". Bruno David Ussher, music critic for the Los Angeles Daily News, was perhaps the most enthusiastic of all:

Conductor Sample introduced a "Nocturne" [unrevised] by Ernest Anderson [sic] of Los Angeles, an astonishing creation in which at last a fusion of such near visionaries as Debussy and Scriabin was accomplished with a daring seldom observed by this writer ... His "Nocturne" further speaks versatility as it bespeaks a sense of reaching out.

After Andersson's death, Sample continued to champion his music. He stated in his 1972 interview that he personally esteemed Andersson as being a superior composer to Charles Ives.

=== List of compositions ===
Aside from a number of juvenilia, Andersson's known musical compositions are:

- Three Sketches for Opera for soprano, tenor, and piano (late 1890s, lost)
- Symphony (1936, lost)
- The Sun-Worshipper, orchestral suite (1937–1938)
- Dreams of Solfomby Francinsadit, orchestral suite (1940?)
- Child's Suite, orchestral suite (1940?)
- Futurama Symphony (1940?; later revised with the assistance of Stravinsky)
- String Quartet (1943)

The manuscript of the revised version of the Futurama Symphony is held in the archives of the UCLA Library. Archival recordings of live performances with the Los Angeles WPA Federal Symphony Orchestra of movements from The Sun-Worshipper and Futurama Symphony also exist.
