= Paul Elgers =

German violinist and music educator

Paul Elgers (real name Wilhelm Paul Bernhard Schmidt) (20 November 1876 – after 1927) was a German violinist and music educator.

== Life ==
Born in Berlin, Elgers was born the son of the factory owner Bernhard Schmidt and his wife Marie Zorn. He attended the Heinrich-Schliemann-Gymnasium (Berlin). From 1895 to 1897 he received violin lessons from Karel Halíř. From 1898 to 1900 he studied violin with Gustav Hollaender and theory with Ludwig Bussler at the Stern Conservatory. In 1900 he changed to Karel Halíř and Joseph Joachim at the Universität der Künste Berlin. From 1901 to 1903 he was taught by Anton Witek in Berlin and from 1903 by Albert Geloso in Paris.

In 1902 he made his debut as a soloist with the Berlin Philharmonic under the direction of Josef Řebíček. Schneider, Tutzing 1982, ISBN 3-7952-0341-4, p. 88. Until 1906 he undertook concert tours. From 1906 to 1911 he was director of the Ochs-Eichelberg Conservatory in Berlin. From 1911 to 1914 he worked as a violin pedagogue in Berlin. In 1919, Bruno Hinze-Reinhold invited him to become head of the 1st violin class at the Hochschule für Musik Franz Liszt, Weimar. After having fallen out with Hinze-Reinhold, he opened a competing violin school in Weimar with Hilde Elgers in September 1924. His successor at the music school was Max Strub. From 1927 Elgers worked as a teacher at the Stern' Conservatory in Berlin. In 1934 he took over a violin training class there.

Elgers, a Protestant, was married and had two children. His son Paul Elgers (1915-1995) was a writer.
