= Mose Christensen =

American conductor

Moses "Mose" Christensen (February 12, 1871 – October 30, 1920) was an American musician, and founder and conductor of the Oregon Symphony (then known as the Portland Symphony Orchestra).

== Early life and education ==
Mose was born in Salt Lake City, Utah. His father, Lars Christensen, had emigrated from Denmark in the early 1850s to Utah as one of the Mormon pioneers. Mose's mother, Elsa Bjerregaard, was Lars Christensen's second wife in a plural marriage.

Mose began his musical training with his father, who played the violin, and his mother, who played the piano. His brothers Chris, Frederic and Lars Peter were part of the Christensen Orchestra that traveled around northern Utah playing for dances and other social functions. The Christensen brothers relocated from Brigham City to Ogden in 1890 and became partners of a dance hall in order to advance their music careers, and in 1893 they moved to Salt Lake City where they once again played for social dances. They were part of the group of musicians who accompanied the Mormon Tabernacle Choir to the Chicago World's Fair in 1893.

== Career ==
After Mose married Carrie Nichols in 1898, he traveled to the East Coast to study with the German violinist Henry Schradieck. After returning to the western United States, he eventually settled in Boise, Idaho, in 1901. During his early years in Boise, Mose met, befriended and became a mentor to the young Ferdinand Sorenson, raising funds with his other musician friends to send Sorenson to New York City to study cello. Sorenson went on to become a renowned cellist, conductor, and teacher in his own right. Mose also traveled to Boston, Massachusetts, to study dancing at the M. B. Gilbert School. In Boise, Mose was a partner of the Riverside Pavilion ballroom where he carried out a social dancing business. Besides playing in his dance orchestra he also played in string quartets, and from 1906 to 1908 was the conductor of the Boise Philharmonic.

In 1908, Mose and his family left Boise. After settling in Portland, Oregon, Mose once again opened a dance hall, and in 1910 joined the American National Association, Masters of Dancing, in New York City. He was elected president of the organization in 1916. Additionally, in order to develop a professional approach to dance at his studio, Mose brought Stefano Mascagno from New York City to teach ballet.

== Later life and death ==
In 1911, Mose gathered with a number of his musician friends at his dance hall to form the Portland Symphony Orchestra on a permanent basis. Until then, symphony concerts were intermittent affairs and years would sometimes pass with no concerts at all. Mose was the first president of the symphony, played the viola, and was one of its conductors on a rotating basis. Mose stopped conducting in 1918 when Carl Denton become the permanent conductor. Mose died two years later at the age of 49.

== See also ==
- Lew Christensen
- Willam Christensen

Cultural offices
Preceded by Waldemar Lind	Conductor, Portland Symphony Orchestra; 1917	Succeeded by Carl Denton
