= Gustav Hollaender =

German violinist, composer, and teacher

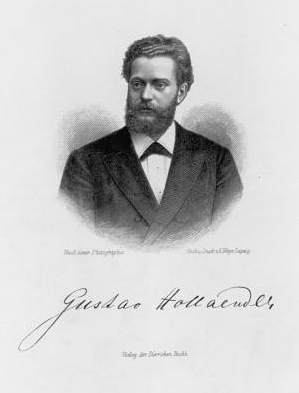
Gustav Hollaender.

Gustav Hollaender (15 February 1855 – 4 December 1915) was a German violinist, conductor, composer and teacher.

== Life and career ==
Hollaender was born in Leobschütz (Upper Silesia), the son of a doctor and also the eldest brother of the writer Felix Hollaender and composer Viktor Hollaender. His musical talents were discovered at an early age.

Hollaender attended the Leipzig Conservatory of Music at the age of twelve, where he studied with Ferdinand David. Later, he went to Berlin and studied with Joseph Joachim (violin) and Friedrich Kiel (composition) at the Royal Music Academy.

In Berlin, Hollaender became a member of the Royal Orchestra, as well as a violin teacher at the Berliner Musikschule (also known as the Theodor Kullak Institute, later the Stern Conservatory). He established his reputation as a violinist in Germany by organizing chamber music evenings at the Singakademie in Berlin with Dr. Hans Bischoft, Hermann Jacobowsky, Xaver Scharwenka, and Heinrich Grünfeld, and making frequent concert tours throughout the country.

After a major concert tour, which Hollaender undertook with Carlotta Patti, Theodore Ritter and Felix Mottl through Austria, he went to Cologne in 1881 to serve as concertmaster of the Gürzenich Orchestra and a violin teacher at the local conservatory. In Cologne, he organized a string quartet with Emil Baré (second violin), Joseph Schwartz (viola) and Friedrich Grützmacher Jr. (cello), touring Germany, Belgium, England, Italy and Denmark.

In 1893, Hollaender was given the title of Royal Professor. Around 1895, he took over the Stern Conservatory of Berlin as an owner and director. He died in Berlin.

Hollaender composed works for the violin, including concerti and a sonata. He was the uncle of the film composer Friedrich Hollaender.

== Legacy ==
Starting in 1900, at its 50th anniversary, the Stern Conversatory began awarding the Gustav Hollaender Medal to outstanding students. Recipients include Claudio Arrau, Max Donner, Lisy Fischer, Frederick Loewe, and Else Schmitz-Gohr.

Hollaender's students include Hans Bassermann, Max Donner, Fritz Cassirer, Paul Elgers, and Else Streit.
