= Carl Denton =

American conductor

James Carlyle "Carl" Denton (November 21, 1874 – November 14, 1955) was an American conductor. He was the first permanent conductor of the Oregon Symphony, then known as the Portland Symphony Orchestra.

== Biography ==
Denton was born at Batley, Yorkshire, England, to James Carl and Agnes Denton née Smith. Denton studied piano from age six, and added to this with study of the organ and violin. According to census records he immigrated to the United States in 1885. He returned to England since we also know that he studied at the Royal Academy of Music for three years, where he was a medalist. Then he became a staff member of the orchestra at Covent Garden where he played for the conductor composers Granville Bantock, Edward Elgar, Samuel Coleridge-Taylor, and Hubert Parry.

Denton was invited to Portland, Oregon, to be organist at Trinity Episcopal Church, where he served from 1901 to 1910. He resigned that post in 1910 to become the organist and choirmaster at St. Stephens's Episcopal Pro-Cathedral, a post he held for 45 years. He was considered an organ virtuoso. He also taught orchestra and music theory at Lincoln High School and other Portland schools for 25 years; and was the representative of the Royal Academy of Music in Portland.

In 1910 Denton helped form the Portland Symphony Society, and in 1911 the orchestra elected Denton as one of four rotating conductors. He lifted his baton at the second concert of the season at the newly opened Heilig Theater on December 17, 1911, and on August 18, 1918, the symphony board appointed him from a field of three candidates as the Portland Symphony's first permanent conductor. After the appointment, he traveled to the east to choose new scores and hear new musical works. He also attended fourteen symphony concerts in San Francisco and Los Angeles. He submitted his resignation as conductor on January 17, 1925, and his final conducting engagement was on May 20, 1925, at the Municipal Auditorium; a concert which included Samuel Coleridge-Taylor's cantata A Tale of Old Japan. At his request, he retained the post of conductor of the Portland Symphony Chorus, which was largely of his making.

The next permanent appointed conductor was Theodore Spiering, one of Denton's suggested rotation of three conductors to complete his symphony season. Spiering was able to serve only a short time before he died.

== Private life ==
Denton married Aileen W. Denton (née Webber) on July 14, 1909. After her death on September 7, 1953, he later moved to Seattle, Washington, to live with his son James C. Denton.

Cultural offices
Preceded by David C. Rosebrook; George E. Jeffery; Mose Christensen	Conductor, Portland Symphony Orchestra; 1911; 1914; 1918–1925	Succeeded by John Bayley; John Bayley; Theodore Spiering
