= Theodore Spiering =

American violinist, conductor, and teacher (1871–1925)

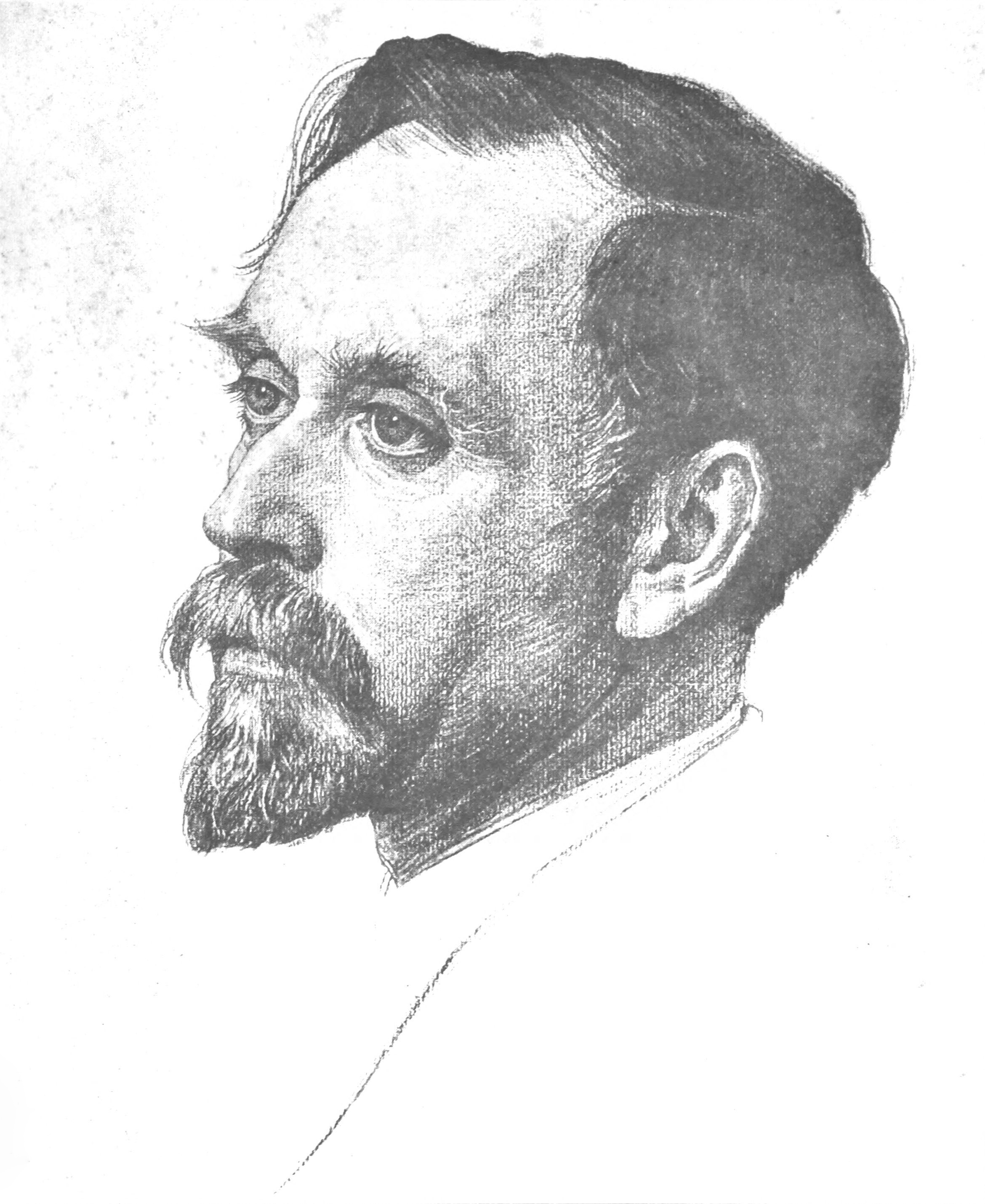

Theodore Bernays Spiering (September 5, 1871 – August 11, 1925) was an American violinist, conductor and teacher.

Spiering was born in Old North St. Louis, Missouri, where at age five he took his first lessons in violin from his father, concertmaster of the St. Louis Symphony Orchestra. He made his first public appearance at age seven. He studied at the College of Music of Cincinnati with violin teacher Henry Schradieck. He studied with Joseph Joachim in Berlin from 1888 to 1892 and later became concertmaster of the orchestra of Joachim Hochschule.

With a letter of recommendation from Joachim, Spiering joined the Chicago Symphony Orchestra in 1892 and remained with that organization until 1896. He often appeared as a soloist with conductor Theodore Thomas. Spiering also organized the Spiering Quartet, which performed 400 concerts between 1893 and 1905. He founded the Spiering Violin School and was also director and instructor of violin for the Chicago Musical College from 1902 to 1905 followed by four years of concert tours in Europe. Gustav Mahler chose him as concertmaster for the New York Philharmonic for two years from 1909, and Spiering was called to conduct the orchestra for the final seventeen concerts of 1911 during Mahler's illness. Although it was expected Spiering would be chosen as Mahler's successor, the tradition of seeking European conductors lead to the selection of Josef Stransky. Disappointed, Spiering returned to Europe, where he guest conducted the Berlin Philharmonic and Blüthner orchestras. Although he sought the position of music director of the Saint Louis Symphony Orchestra, but the position was given to Rudolf Ganz instead.

With the start of World War I, Spiering returned to New York City and engaged in teaching and conducting the philharmonic. In September 1923, he returned again to Berlin and Vienna, where he continued to guest conduct. In 1925, he was appointed conductor of the Oregon Symphony, then the Portland Symphony Orchestra, which he previously conducted as part of a rotating triumvirate. For rest and also to choose new scores for the orchestra, he traveled to Europe after the appointment. In the summer of 1925, Spiering became ill while traveling and died in Munich before the beginning of the fall symphony season. His body was later repatriated and buried in Bellefontaine Cemetery in St. Louis.

Cultural offices
| Preceded by Carl Denton | Conductor, Portland Symphony Orchestra; 1925 | Succeeded by Willem van Hoogstraten |
