= David Danzmayr =

Austrian conductor (born 1980)

- Born: 1980 (age 45–46); Oberndorf bei Salzburg, Austria
- Education: Sibelius Academy
- Occupation: Conductor

David Danzmayr (born 1980, Oberndorf bei Salzburg, Austria) is an Austrian conductor.

== Biography ==
Danzmayr is one of two children from an artistic family, where his mother was an artist, and his father was a presenter for a Salzburg radio station and also a composer. Danzmayr studied at the Mozarteum Salzburg and at the Sibelius Academy in Helsinki. During his studies, he received a conducting scholarship from the Gustav Mahler Youth Orchestra, where he was a conducting assistant to Claudio Abbado and to Pierre Boulez. In June 2006, he became music director of the Ensemble Acrobat.

In 2005 and 2012, Danzmayr took part in the Nikolai Malko conducting competition. He is a recipient of the Bernhard Paumgartner Medal of the International Mozarteum Foundation. In 2013, he won 2nd prize at the International Gustav Mahler Conducting Competition of the Bamberg Symphony Orchestra.

Danzmayr was assistant conductor of the Royal Scottish National Orchestra for three years, from 2007 to 2010. On the European continent, Danzmayr was chief conductor of the Zagreb Philharmonic Orchestra from 2016 to 2019.

In the US, Danzmayr was music director of the Illinois Philharmonic Orchestra from 2012 to 2016. Since 2013, he has been music director of the ProMusica Chamber Orchestra in Columbus, Ohio. His current contract with the ProMusica Chamber Orchestra is through 2026. In 2018, Danzmayr first guest-conducted the Oregon Symphony, and returned in 2019 for an additional guest-conducting appearance. In February 2021, the Oregon Symphony announced the appointment of Danzmayr as its next music director, effective with the 2021–2022 season. In October 2025, the Oregon Symphony announced the extension of Danzmayr's contract as its music director through the 2028–2029 season.

Cultural offices
Preceded by Carmon DeLeone	Music Director, Illinois Philharmonic; 2012–2016	Succeeded by Stilian Kirov
Preceded by Timothy Russell	Music Director, ProMusica Chamber Orchestra; 2013–present	Succeeded by incumbent
Preceded by Vjekoslav Šutej	Chief Conductor, Zagreb Philharmonic Orchestra; 2016–2019	Succeeded by Dawid Runtz
Preceded by Carlos Kalmar	Music Director, Oregon Symphony; 2021–present	Succeeded by incumbent
