= James Sample (conductor) =

American conductor (1910–1995)

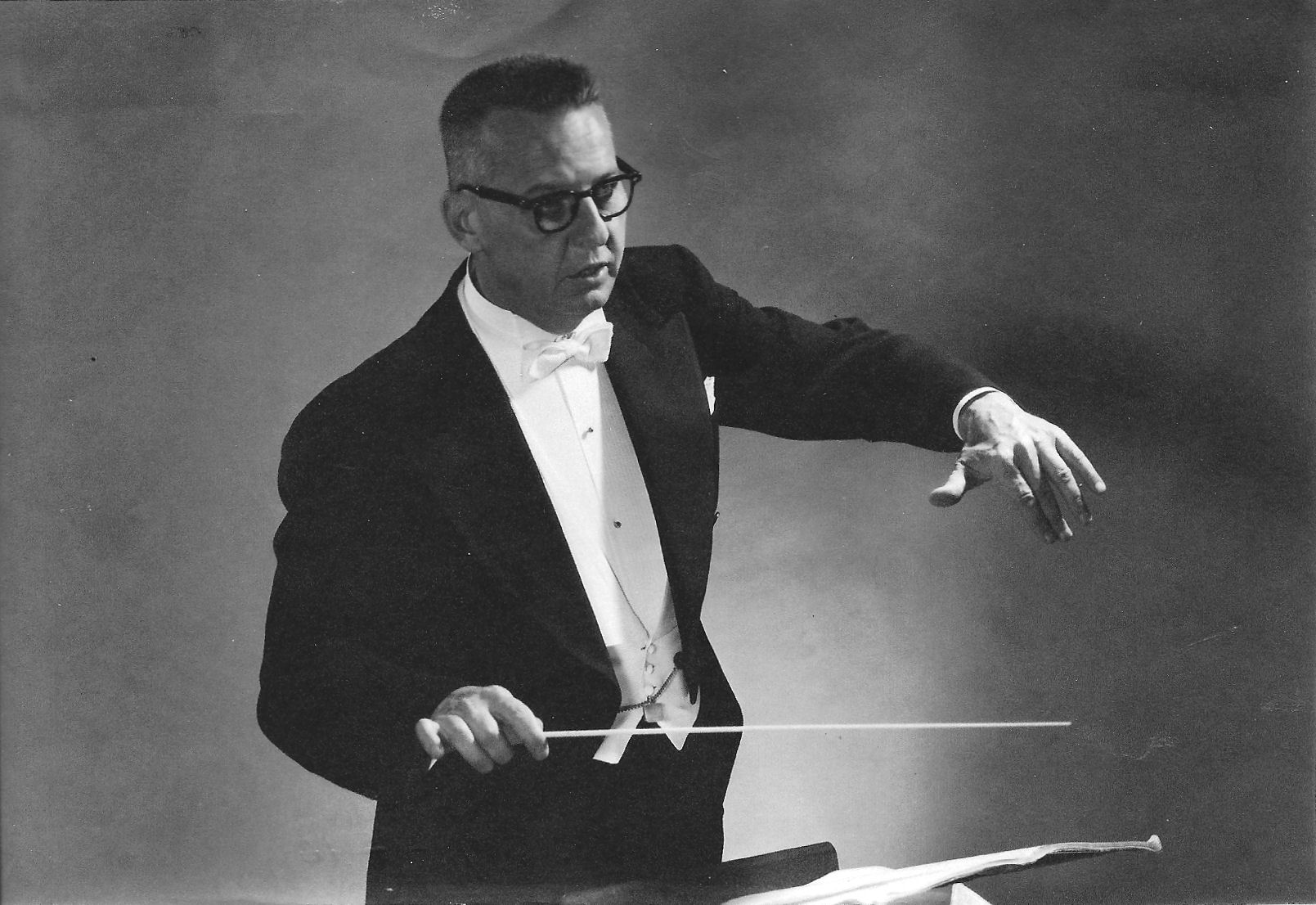
James Sample

James W. Sample (October 8, 1910 – October 7, 1995) was an American conductor.

== Biography ==
Sample was born in Minneapolis, Minnesota, and began studying the violin at age ten and piano at age eleven. By the age of twenty he conducted his first symphony in Minneapolis. He earned his bachelor's in music degree at the MacPhail School of Music in 1930. In Europe, he studied for four years receiving a diploma at the Mozarteum Salzburg in 1934, and also studied with Pierre Monteux who was conducting the Paris Symphony. Sample also studied with Henri Verbrugghen and Bernhard Paumgartner. He also received a doctorate in music in 1942 from the New York College of Music and a doctor of laws degree from Gannon College in 1963.

Sample was the Master of Music at The Blake School in Minneapolis 1929–1933. He also organized the Little Symphony of Minneapolis 1931–1933. Guest conducting in Austria and France occupied his musical efforts in 1933–1937. He was the conductor for the symphony and opera music project in Los Angeles, 1938–1942. In this capacity he led the premiere of Igor Stravinsky’s choral and orchestral setting of The Star-Spangled Banner on October 14, 1941 at the Embassy Auditorium in Los Angeles featuring the WPA Orchestra, Los Angeles Oratorio Society, and the WPA Negro Chorus. Beginning in 1942, he served as an assistant to Canadian conductor Wilfrid Pelletier at the Metropolitan Opera. He made his conducting debut at New York’s City Center Opera Company replacing Laszlo Halasz on February 25, 1944 for Friedrich von Flotow’s opera Martha. He was with the Met and City Center Opera 1942–1945. He guest-conducted the Utah Symphony Orchestra 1945–1946 and is credited with a prominent role in the formation of that orchestra. He was the associate conductor for the San Francisco Symphony transcontinental tour led by Pierre Monteux in 1947. As such, he conducted the orchestra at Carnegie Hall in "Happy Birthday to You" for Monteux's 72nd birthday on April 4, 1947.

Sample was the conductor of the San Bernardino Symphony and Hollywood Chamber Orchestra 1947–1949. He was in charge of the KFI (Radio) Symphony Orchestra in Los Angeles 1946–49. He was conducting their Hollywood Bowl Orchestra auditions when he was selected to be the conductor of the Oregon Symphony. He led that orchestra, then known as the Portland Symphony, in the years 1949–1953. He also led that orchestra in performances on the "Standard Hour" radio program. Sample was credited by the orchestra's manager Phil Hart with making the orchestra and conductor a part of community life. He succeeded Fritz Mahler as conductor of the Erie Philharmonic in 1953, which he conducted 1953–1967; and became conductor of the Fort Wayne Philharmonic Orchestra in 1967. He retired from conducting in 1982 to devote his time to composition and coaching advanced vocal students.

== Personal life ==
James Sample was married to Ernestine F. Sample (August 15, 1909 – September 6, 1980). Her father was Earnest Andersson, a polymath and self-taught composer whose music Sample championed. He died in 1995 of a heart condition in Meadville, Pennsylvania on the day before what would have been his 85th birthday. He is buried in the Columbarium Chapel of Lakewood Cemetery in Minneapolis.

== Awards ==
- City of Erie Award, 1967

Cultural offices
Preceded by Werner Janssen	Conductor, Portland Symphony Orchestra; 1949–1953	Succeeded by Theodore Bloomfield
