= Willem van Hoogstraten =

Dutch violinist and conductor

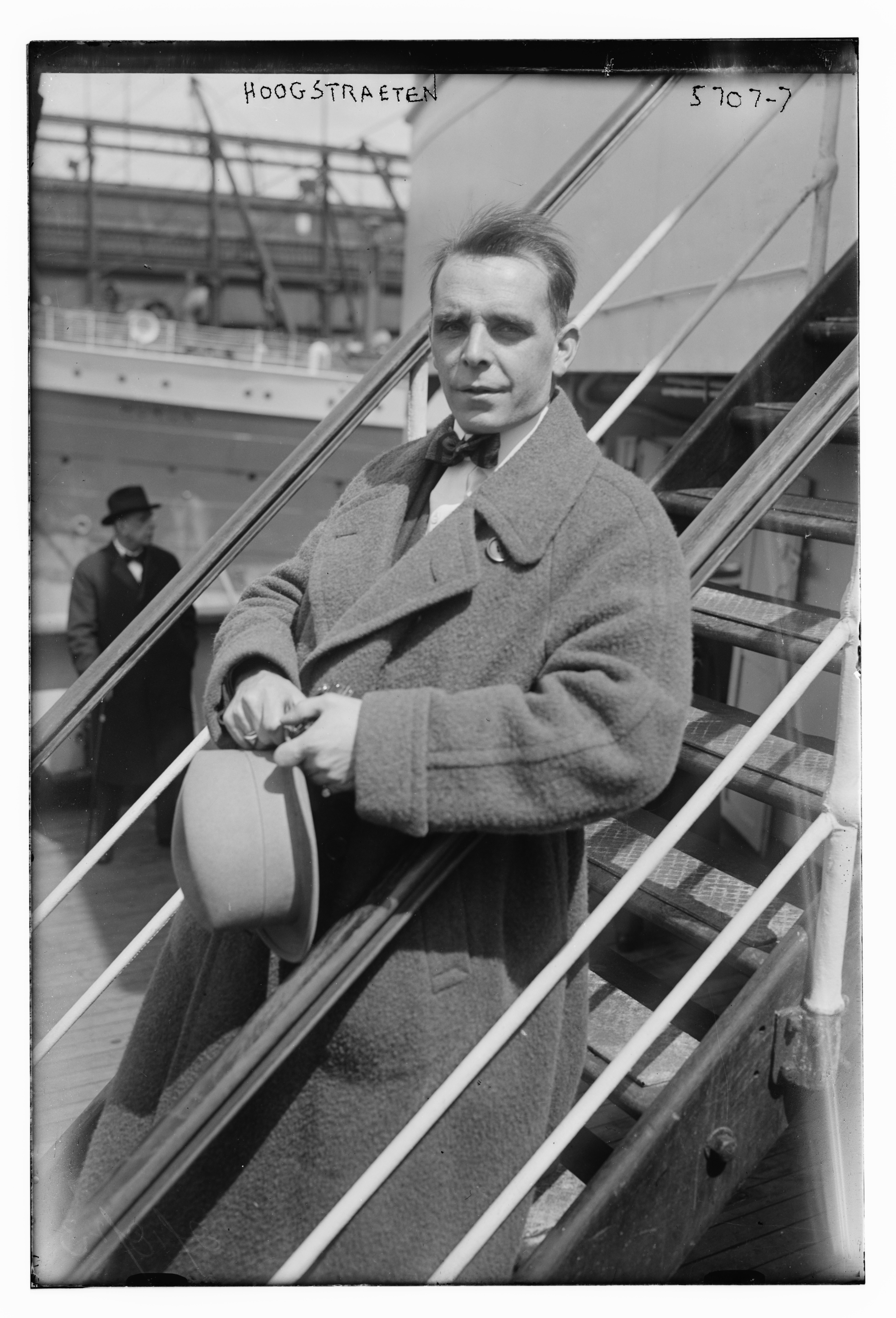
van Hoogstraten in 1922

Willem van Hoogstraten (March 18, 1884 – September 11, 1965) was a Dutch violinist and conductor.

Van Hoogstraten was born in Utrecht, and studied the violin from age eight including studies with Alexander Schmuller, and enrolled at the conservatory in Cologne at age sixteen where he studied with Bram Eldering. He also studied violin with Otakar Ševcik in Prague.

He began his career as the conductor at a health resort, and then conducted the orchestra at Kleefeld 1914–1918.

He was married for sixteen years, from 1911 to 1927, to the pianist Elly Ney. They met in 1907 at the conservatory in Cologne where Ney was a teacher. They traveled throughout Europe performing chamber music, recruiting cellist Fritz Reitz to form a trio. They made their home at Tutzing on the Starnberger See. The two recorded the final three Beethoven piano concertos together for Colosseum Records. A daughter was born to them, the actress Eleonore van Hoogstraten. The couple divorced in 1927.

Van Hoogstraten conducted a Brahms festival in Vienna, and the Mozart festival in Salzburg, as well as guest conducting throughout Europe. He conducted the New York Philharmonic at the Lewisohn Stadium summer concert series from 1922 to 1939 where he was also served as associate conductor from 1923 to 1925. At the Lewisohn, in 1927 he conducted the New York Philharmonic playing Rhapsody in Blue and Concerto in F with George Gershwin as soloist. Van Hoogstraten was appointed by the Philharmonic Society to serve as director of the orchestra between Josef Stránský and Willem Mengelberg, serving half of the orchestra's season until Mengelberg was available.

After the untimely death of Theodore Spiering in 1925, Van Hoogstraten was appointed music director of the Oregon Symphony, where he served for thirteen seasons. From 1939 to 1945, he was permanent conductor of the Mozarteum Salzburg.

Van Hoogstraten died in 1965 in Tutzing, and is buried there with his ex-wife, Elly Ney, at Neuer Friedhof.

Cultural offices
| Preceded by Theodore Spiering | Conductor, Portland Symphony Orchestra; 1925–1938 | Succeeded by Werner Janssen |
