= Werner Janssen =

American conductor (1899–1990)

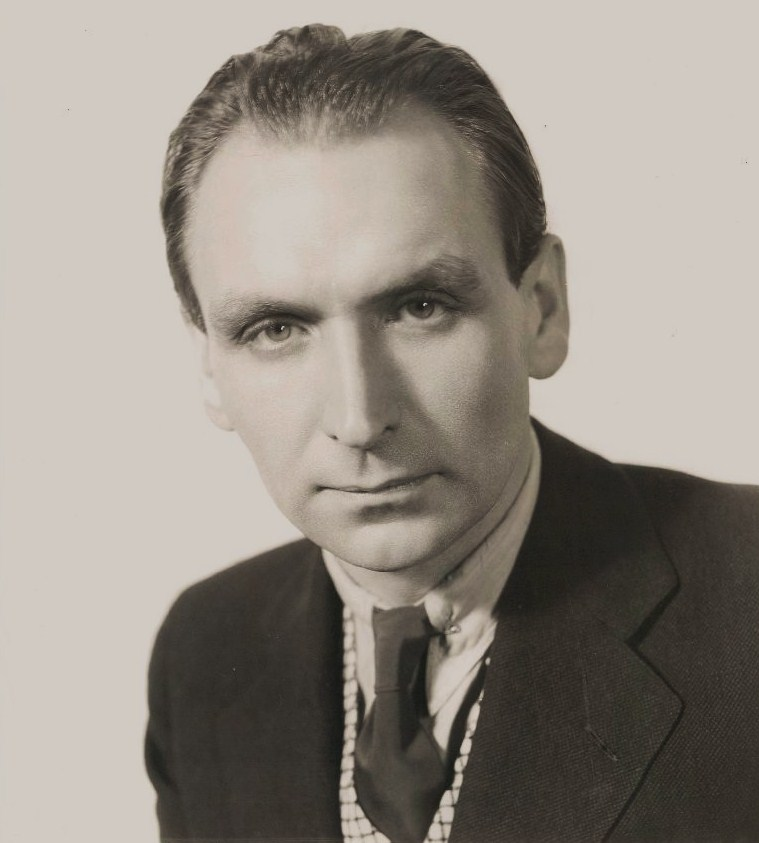
Werner Janssen (1937)

Werner Janssen (born Werner Alexander Oscar Janssen; June 1, 1899 – September 19, 1990) was an American composer and conductor of classical music and film scores. He was the first New York-born conductor to lead the New York Philharmonic. For his film work he was nominated for six Academy Awards.

== Formative influences and career ==
Werner Alexander Oscar Janssen was born in New York City on June 1, 1899, to August Louis Janssen and Alice Bianca E. (née von Boeckmann) Janssen. His father was a New York restaurateur, founder of the Janssen Hofbräu Haus on Broadway. The family lived in Great Neck on King's Point Road next door to musician George M. Cohan. It was Cohan who encouraged young Werner to continue to play piano and explore his passion for music. Cohan described the interplay of the families as he states, "I'll hold to my dying day that Werner became a musician because his dad made him practice the piano all day to keep me awake, just to get even with me for playing all night and keeping him awake." Werner recounted that his first two music students were the daughters of George M. Cohan, whom he taught in their home. As a teenager Werner remembers hearing the first renditions of "Over there" from across the fence between the houses. Cohan reflected on those days, writing to Werner's father, "those were golden days when you were singing songs and I was trying to write them down next door — they were in fact the happiest of all any days as I look back on them now."

August strongly encouraged Werner to enter the family business, opposing the son's desire for a musical career. After Werner completed secondary school (graduating from Phillips Exeter Academy) he had to support his own musical education at Dartmouth College. He did this by being a waiter, performing in cabarets and theaters, and selling his own popular compositions. At the New England Conservatory of Music he studied with the composers George Chadwick and Frederick Converse. He studied piano with Arthur Friedheim, a pupil of Franz Liszt.

Janssen entered the US military (infantry) in World War I. After the war he returned to his studies and earned a bachelor's degree in music at Dartmouth College in 1921. He began to compose jazz songs for Tin Pan Alley. He made recordings as a pianist of two of his popular songs in 1920. He composed for the Ziegfeld Follies of 1925 and 1926 and wrote several songs which became national hits. This helped finance his conducting studies with Felix Weingartner in Basel, Switzerland (1920–21) and with Hermann Scherchen in Strasbourg, France (1921–25). He also received a Juilliard Fellowship and the Rome Prize from the American Academy in Rome for his tone poem for large orchestra in a jazz idiom New Year's Eve in New York. That composition received its premiere from the Rochester Philharmonic Orchestra conducted by Howard Hanson on May 8, 1929. In 1930, it was performed by the Cleveland Orchestra conducted by Nikolai Sokoloff, and was recorded in 1929 by the Victor Symphony Orchestra, conducted by Nathaniel Shilkret. Shilkret and Janssen were later (1945) to exchange roles, with Janssen and his Symphony Orchestra of Los Angeles conducting the Genesis Suite, which was conceived and coauthored by Shilkret.

In 1927, he was hired by NBC to conduct symphony concerts over the radio but was dismissed early on. He was engaged in 1929 by Samuel Roxy Rothapfel to conduct at his Roxy Theater but was soon fired from that position as well. Three years of studying in Rome at the Accademia Nazionale di Santa Cecilia with mentor Ottorino Respighi resulted in several new compositions including the Louisiana Suite and the string quartet American Kaleidoscope performed by the Quartetto di Roma. His work with that group led to an engagement to conduct the Royal Orchestra of Rome. He also took conducting engagements throughout Europe (including Berlin, Budapest, Copenhagen, Riga, Stockholm, and Turin). He conducted an entire concert of the works of Jean Sibelius in Helsinki in February 1934. Sibelius said of this concert: "You may say that tonight Finland has for the first time discovered my music. This achievement of Janssen's is the deed of a hero". After a second concert, he received the Order of the White Rose on March 8, 1936, from the government of Finland for his contribution to Finnish music.

He was appointed associate conductor of the New York Philharmonic for the 1934–35 season, and on November 8, 1934, became the first American-born conductor to lead the orchestra. He was conductor of the Baltimore Symphony Orchestra from 1937 through 1939. While Janssen filled roles as guest conductor, he was also contracted to write film music. His first credited film score was for The General Died at Dawn (1936), which was nominated for an Academy Award, the first of six Janssen scored films to be nominated. In 1939, he resigned his position with the Baltimore Symphony Orchestra to work with film producer Walter Wanger. He composed several other film scores including Blockade (1938), Winter Carnival (1939), Eternally Yours (1939), Slightly Honorable (1940), The House Across the Bay (1940), Guest in the House (1944), The Southerner (1945), Captain Kidd (1945), A Night in Casablanca (1946), Ruthless (1948), and Uncle Vanya (1957), starring and co-directed by Franchot Tone. He was also responsible for the score for the 1966 German television production Robin Hood, der edle Ritter (Robin Hood, the Noble Knight). He continued to write non-film compositions too, including the Foster Suite (1937), the String Quartet No. 2 (1938), the Octet for Five (1965), and the Quintet for 10 Instruments (1968).

In 1940, he formed the Janssen Symphony in Los Angeles, which became a rival organization to the Los Angeles Philharmonic and a forum for contemporary music until 1952. Compositions for this were commissioned from American composers. This group performed and recorded film music, musical theater works, and contemporary musical scores. Numerous recordings were made by Janssen and this orchestra for Capitol Records. Janssen formed a partnership with producer David L. Loew to produce the Musicolor series of classic musical shorts, including Toccata and Fugue (1946) and Enchanted Lake (1947), both filmed in Cinecolor. He was the music director of the Utah Symphony 1946–47, the Oregon Symphony 1947–49, and the San Diego Philharmonic (1952–54). He also had positions at the NBC Symphony Orchestra ("Symphony of the Air") (1956), Toronto Symphony Orchestra (1956–57), the Belgrade Philharmonic Orchestra, the Vienna State Opera Orchestra (1959–61) and the Vienna Volksoper. Recordings with the latter included Karl-Birger Blomdahl's opera, Aniara; and Sergei Prokofiev’s opera War and Peace. He returned to the U.S. in the early 1970s.

Shilkret, described Arthur Judson as being the leading person for choosing symphony conductors, and he quotes Crawford as quoting Hart: "All agree that from 1915 to 1956, at least, Arthur Judson exercised a power and influence in the symphony and concert affairs of this country without equal then or at any other time." Shilkret says that "Werner Janssen tells, in his unpublished autobiography (referenced as 'Janssen, Werner and D. Bruce Lockerbie, ca 1980, While the Music Lasts, unpublished, 261 double-spaced typed pages'), of unintentionally bypassing Judson and later being forced to pay Judson a commission on all of his (Janssen's) performance fees, without getting a single booking from Judson in return."

== Personal life ==
Janssen was married three times, to:

- Elsa Schmidt, an Indianapolis brewery heiress, by whom he had two children, Werner Jr. (1924–2012) and Alice (1923–2011, later Krelle). They divorced in 1937.
- Ann Harding, the Hollywood actress, whom he married in 1937. Their marriage ended in divorce in 1962. By this marriage he had a stepdaughter, Jane Harding.
- Christina Heintzmann, by whom he had a daughter, Jennifer.

== Death ==
Janssen died on September 19, 1990, aged 91, in Stony Brook, New York.

== Awards and honours ==
- Juilliard Fellowship
- Prix de Rome (Rome Prize) for Musical Composition, American Academy in Rome, 1930
- Fellow of the American Academy in Rome, 1930
- Honorary Doctorate in Music (Mus.D. honoris causa) from Dartmouth College, 1935
- Order of the White Rose of Finland, Knight First Class, 1936

== Sources ==
- Composers of Today, 2nd Edition (1936)
- Living Musicians 1st Supplement; Living Musicians (1940)
- Who Was Who in America, 10th ed., Chicago: Marquis (1993)

Cultural offices
Preceded by Willem van Hoogstraten	Conductor, Portland Symphony Orchestra; 1947–1949	Succeeded by James Sample
