= Elly Ney =

German classical pianist (1882–1968)

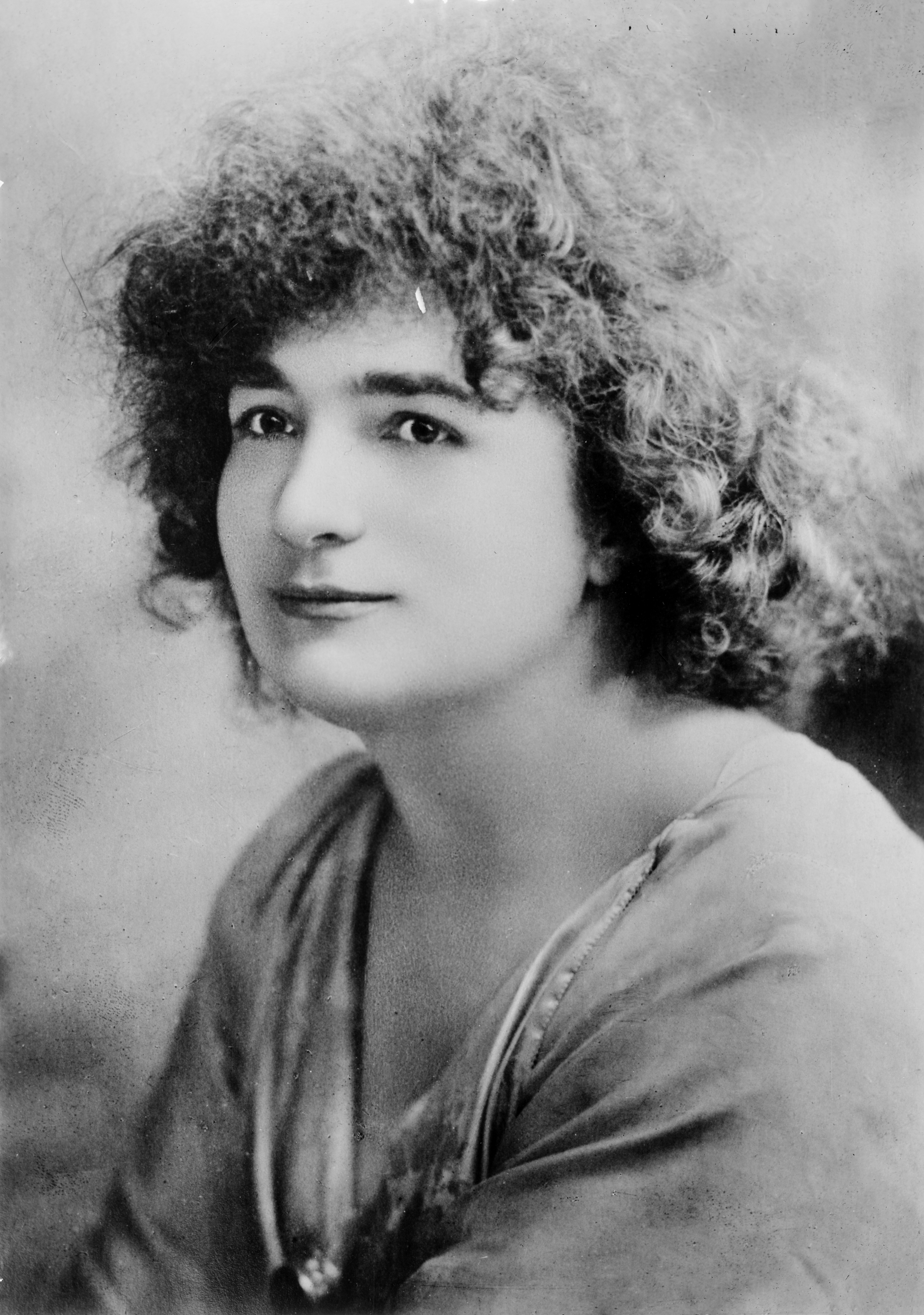
- Elly Ney, 1900

Background information
- Born: 27 September 1882; Düsseldorf, German Empire
- Died: 31 March 1968 (aged 85) Tutzing, West Germany
- Genres: Romantic, Classical
- Instrument: Piano

Elly Ney (27 September 1882 – 31 March 1968) was a German romantic pianist who specialized in Beethoven, and was especially popular in Germany and the United States.

== Early life and career ==
Born in Düsseldorf, Elly Ney was introduced to the music of Ludwig van Beethoven by her grandmother, who became the strongest early influence on her musical development. She studied at the Cologne Conservatory with Isidor Seiss and Karl Bötcher. At the age of sixteen, she won the Mendelssohn Prize in Berlin (1901), a key milestone in her early career, and also placed first in the Ibach competition. She subsequently pursued advanced training in Vienna, taking lessons with Theodor Leschetizky—whose pedagogical lineage traced back to Beethoven through Carl Czerny—and completing her studies with Emil von Sauer, a prominent disciple of Franz Liszt.

After graduating, Ney taught at the Cologne Conservatory for three years, taking over Seiss's masterclass, before deciding to commit herself fully to a career as a touring virtuoso. She launched her performing career in 1904 and made her Viennese debut the following year. Early engagements in Germany featured solo recitals and orchestral collaborations, often centred on Beethoven's sonatas and concertos—works that would define her repertoire. Her rise was accelerated through high-profile partnerships, including frequent appearances with conductor Arthur Nikisch and the Leipzig Gewandhaus Orchestra. She also performed chamber music with a trio comprising cellist Fritz Reitz and violinist Willem van Hoogstraten, whom she married in 1911.

Ney's international career began with a successful tour of Europe, launching in Holland. She made her London debut in 1911 with the Classical Concert Society at the Wigmore Hall, performing works by Brahms. In January 1912, she appeared at a Queen's Hall Promenade Concert under Henry Wood, playing Brahms's Piano Concerto No. 1, and returned for several further Proms appearances through 1930, including a performance of Tchaikovsky's Piano Concerto No. 1 in August 1930.

In 1921, Ney extended her tours to the United States, travelling with her husband. She made her American debut on 15 October 1921 at Carnegie Hall in New York City with an all-Beethoven programme, and gave two further Carnegie Hall recitals during the decade. American critics praised her technical symmetry, tonal variety, and reposefulness. On 9 December 1926, she gave the world premiere of Ernst Toch's Piano Concerto, Op. 38, in Leipzig with Wilhelm Furtwängler conducting, and repeated the work in the United States the following year with the Chicago Symphony Orchestra under Frederick Stock. Her final American appearance took place in 1929, marking the end of her pre-war transatlantic engagements.

In 1927, Ney was granted the honorary freedom of Beethoven's birthplace, Bonn, a rare distinction that reflected her deep association with the city and its most famous son. In 1932, she founded the Elly Ney Trio with violinist Wilhelm Stross and cellist Ludwig Hoelscher. (Some sources give the trio's violinist as Max Strub, indicating a possible change in personnel over time.) The group recorded chamber works, including Brahms's Piano Trio in B major, Op. 8, and in quintet settings collaborated with Florizel von Reuter (violin) and Walter Trampler (viola).

Ney's discography from the 1930s includes extensive electrical recordings for labels such as Brunswick and Electrola, capturing solo works and concertos with orchestras under conductors including Fritz Zaun and her former husband Willem van Hoogstraten. Her pre‑war 78‑rpm recordings—particularly her Beethoven and Brahms interpretations—have been reissued on CD in later decades. After her last American appearance in 1929, she gave her final Prom in August 1930 before returning to Germany, where she remained for the rest of her life.

== Personal life ==
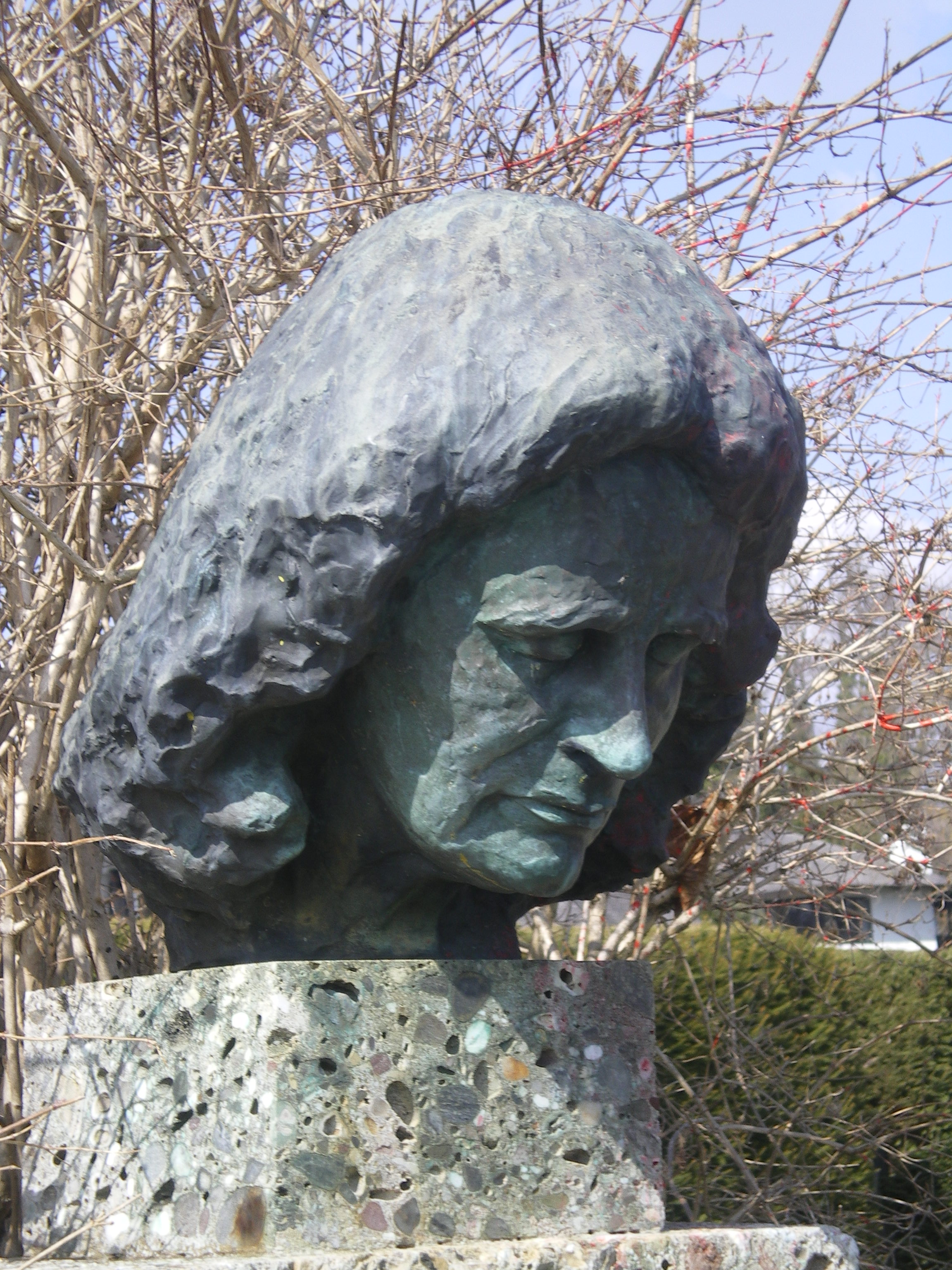
Bust of Elly Ney, Tutzing

In 1911, Ney married Dutch violinist and conductor Willem van Hoogstraten. They frequently performed together and toured the United States in the 1920s. They had one daughter. The marriage ended in divorce in 1927.

In January 1928, she married Paul F. Allais, a coal dealer from Chicago. That marriage also ended in divorce. She remained close to her daughter Eleonore, and she later reconciled with Willhem van Hoogstraten, and they continued to work together professionally.

== Third Reich era ==
Ney joined the Nazi Party in 1937. That same year, Adolf Hitler appointed her a professor at the Hochschule für Musik in Berlin. She participated in "cultural education" camps and became an honorary member of the League of German Girls. She was placed in charge of the Beethoven Festivals in Bonn under Nazi auspices and was awarded the War Merit Cross, 2nd Class, for her troop care. During this period, she made public statements of loyalty to the regime, drawing parallels between Hitler's "most sacred convictions" and the music of Beethoven. In 1933 she refused to replace the Jewish pianist Rudolf Serkin at a performance in Hamburg.

Her relationship with the National Socialist regime was marked by contradictions, a complexity that emerges vividly from the intimate tape recordings she made with her chauffeur and confidant, Frithjof von Bodungen, in the 1960s.

A fervent German nationalist with antisemitic views, she enthusiastically supported the Third Reich and published statements to that effect in the German musical press. However, alongside this documented collaboration, the chauffeur recordings revealed that Ney expressed that she felt marginalized by the regime. She reportedly only received her professorial title after the intervention of the composer Richard Strauss.

== Post-War period ==
Ney went through the Allied denazification process. The authorities examined her Nazi Party membership, her public support for Hitler and her inclusion on the regime's list of "God-gifted" artists. She was initially banned from performing in public. The denazification tribunal classified her as a Mitläufer—a "fellow traveller"—the category for people who joined the party but were not directly responsible for crimes. She was able to resume performing in the late 1940s.

However, the city of Bonn, which had made her an honorary citizen in 1927, kept its own ban on her performing because of her open Nazi sympathies and her refusal to distance herself from the regime. Some Jewish musicians protested when her clearance was considered, pointing to her pre-war antisemitism. On 21 May 1952, Bonn lifted the performance ban, allowing her to play in her hometown again, and soon after she was named an Honorary Citizen of Tutzing, where she lived from 1937 up until her death in 1968.

== 75th birthday tribute in Bonn ==
On 27 September 1957, Elly Ney was honored on her 75th birthday with a large public celebration in Bonn's market square. She stood on the steps of the decorated city hall, accompanied by Federal President Professor Theodor Heuss and other city dignitaries. The broadcast highlighted her artistic generosity: she had always played Beethoven liberally, both in concerts and for younger generations, thereby bringing his music to many people. The event was a festive and multifaceted tribute, recognizing both her artistic achievements and her deep, historical connection to Bonn and to Beethoven's music.

Following the tribute, Ney continued to perform in Germany during the late 1950s and 1960s. In 1964, at age 82, she performed Beethoven's Choral Fantasy in Munich. The next year, at age 83, she played on Beethoven's own Graf piano. Her final performances tapered off in the mid-1960s as her health declined.

== Death and legacy ==
Elly Ney died on 31 March 1968, in Tutzing, at age 85.

Her recordings have remained available, especially her Beethoven performances from the 1930s. Critics continue to praise her 1936 recording of Beethoven's Op. 111 sonata for its depth and power. Her interpretations represent a Romantic approach to Beethoven that has largely fallen out of fashion.

Her association with Nazism has overshadowed her musical legacy. Modern evaluations recognize her technical skill and pianistic brilliance, but also emphasize her support for the Nazi regime and her antisemitic views . Scholars today use her career as an example of how classical musicians became entangled with the Third Reich's cultural machine, and the ethical questions that raises about separating art from the artist.
