= Amy Schwartz Moretti =

American violinist

Amy Schwartz Moretti (born 1975) is an American violinist, who performs internationally as a soloist and chamber musician. She is a member of the Ehnes Quartet.

Moretti was born in Wisconsin and raised in North Carolina and California. She studied in the pre-college program at the San Francisco Conservatory of Music, who awarded her their Distinguished Alumni Award in 2014, and earned bachelor's and master's degrees from the Cleveland Institute of Music, who awarded her an Alumni Achievement Award in 2005. She has been concertmaster at The Florida Orchestra and the Oregon Symphony and in 2007 became the first director of the Robert McDuffie Center for Strings at the Townsend School of Music where she held the Caroline Paul King Chair in Strings at Mercer University until July 2026.
