= Zagreb Philharmonic Orchestra =

Croatian symphony orchestra

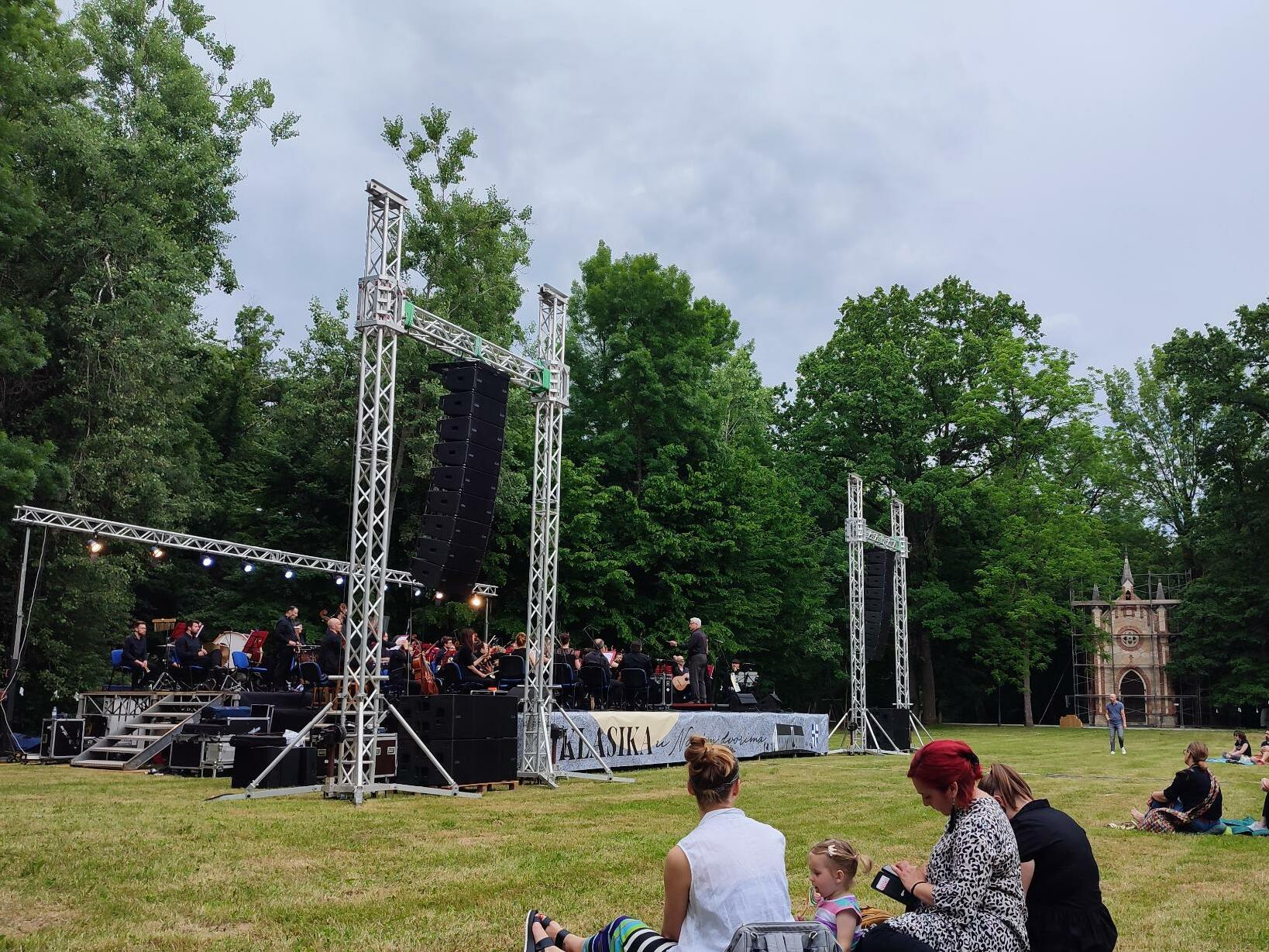
- Zagreb Philharmonic Orchestra performing in Novi Dvori of Zaprešić.
- Founded: 1871
- Principal conductor: Dawid Runtz
- Website: www.zgf.hr

The Zagreb Philharmonic Orchestra (Croatian: Zagrebačka filharmonija) is a Croatian orchestra based in Zagreb. The orchestra gives its concerts principally at the Vatroslav Lisinski Concert Hall and at the Croatian National Theatre, Zagreb.

== History ==
The origins of the orchestra can be found in the opera ensemble of the Croatian National Theatre, Zagreb. In the 19th century, musical ensembles in Zagreb were mostly unorganized, until in 1870, Ivan Zajc established an ensemble for the national theatre. He organised and conducted a professional concert on the 25 February 1871, in Stanković's theatre (the present-day building of the Zagreb Assembly). The orchestra performed a Quodlibet, a style of composition where melodies and motifs from a range of pieces would be combined into a single performance.

A symphony concert in 1916 marked a historical performance in Zagreb's musical history. The concert of young Croatian composers (Croatian: Simfonijski koncert mladih hrvatskih skladatelja) showcased a wide range of composers from the country, including Dora Pejačević. They played at the Croatian National Theatre.

After World War I, significant changes were brought to how Zagreb's musical ensembles were organised. In 1919, at the encouragement of violinist Dragutin Arany, musicians of the opera ensemble officially formed a philharmonic orchestra. The orchestra's name was formally changed to the Zagreb Philharmonic Orchestra on 3 October 1920.

Recent chief conductors of the orchestra have included Kazushi Ōno (1990–1996), Vjekoslav Šutej (2003–2009), and David Danzmayr (2016–2019). Since 2021, the orchestra's chief conductor is Dawid Runtz.

== Selected discography ==
- Beethoven, Violin concerto in D major, conducted by Milan Horvat and Ivan Ozim
- Beethoven, Symphony No. 2, Symphony No. 5, conducted by Richard Edlinger
- Beethoven, Symphony No. 4, Symphony No. 7
- Beethoven, Symphony No. 8, conducted by Richard Edlinger and Michael Halász
- Beethoven, Symphony No. 9
- Janáček, Sinfonietta, conducted by Lovro Matačić
- Keleman, Piano concerto, with Melita Lorković on piano
- Mozart, Piano Concerto no. 27, with conductor Mladen Bašić
- Prokofiev: Symphony No. 1
- Rimsky-Korsakov, Scheherazade, with conductor Pavle Dešpalj
- Shostakovich, Symphony No. 1, conducted by Milan Horvat
- Shostakovich, Symphony No. 9
- Smetana, My Fatherland
- Stravinsky, Petrushka

== Chief conductors (partial list) ==
- Pavle Dešpalj (1980–1985)
- Kazushi Ōno (1990–1996)
- Alexander Rahbari (1997–1999)
- Vjekoslav Šutej (2003–2009)
- David Danzmayr (2016–2019)
- Dawid Runtz (2021–present)
