= Theodore Bloomfield =

American conductor (1923–1998)

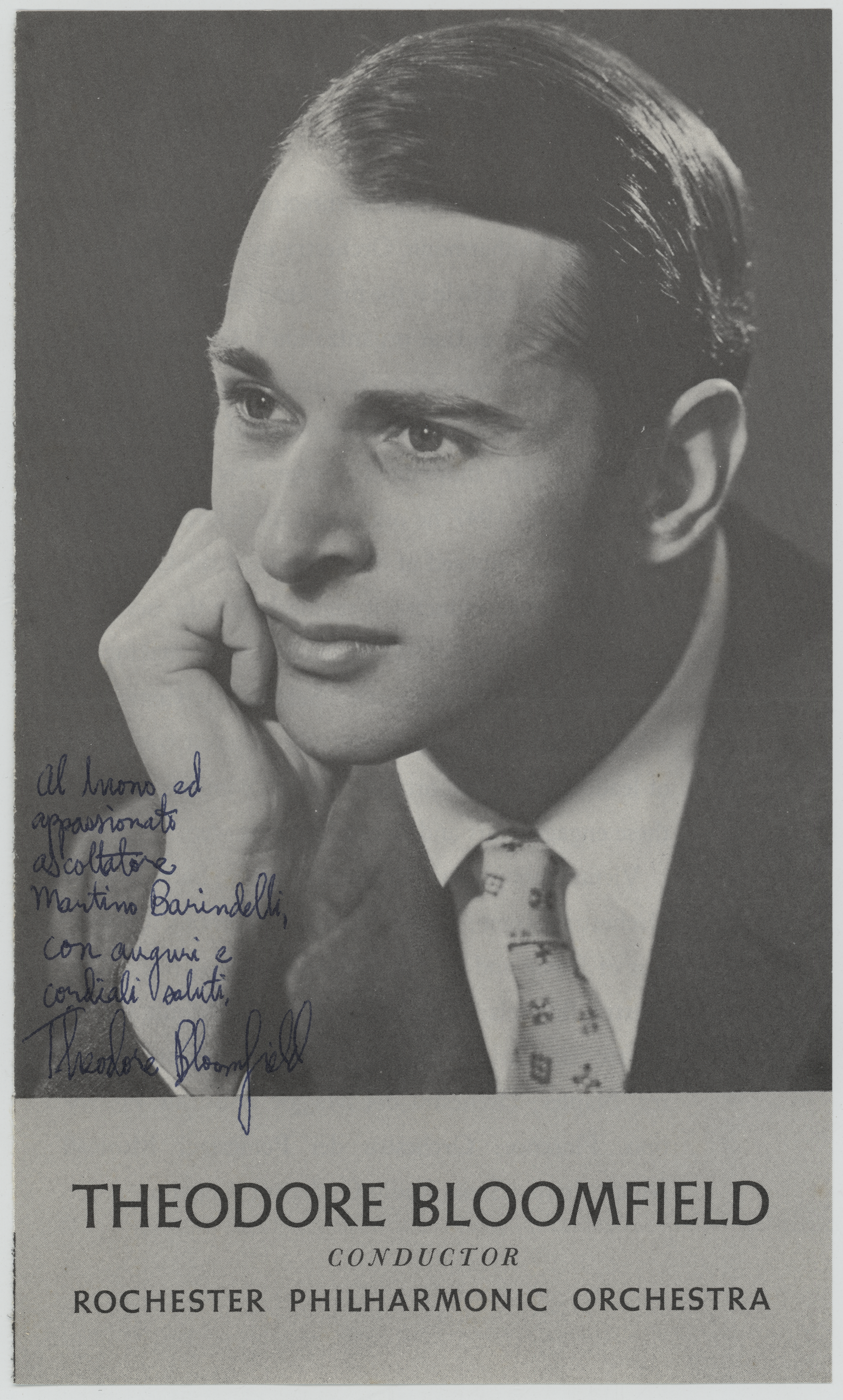
- Theodore Bloomfield (photo with 1961 dedication)
- Born: Theodore Robert Bloomfield
- Occupation: conductor
- Years active: -1990

Theodore Robert Bloomfield (June 14, 1923 – April 1, 1998) was an American conductor.

He was born in Cleveland, Ohio, he studied music at Oberlin College in Ohio and conducting with Edgar Schenkman for two years on a fellowship at the Juilliard School in Manhattan. He studied French horn to gain experience in orchestral performance, and he also studied piano with the Chilean pianist Claudio Arrau. For two summers, he studied conducting with Pierre Monteux in Hancock, Maine. In 1946, Monteux conducted the San Francisco Symphony in the premiere of Bloomfield's transcription of Bach's Toccata and Fugue in C major. Artur Rodzinski conducted the New York Philharmonic premiere of Bloomfield's Toccata and Fugue transcription on October 3, 1946. Olin Downes review stated "This is a sound job, one free from oversimplification or the sensational effects in which so many modern transcriptions indulge. Mr. Bloomfield tells us that he tried to instrumentate as he believes Bach would have done had he had a modern orchestra at his disposal". He closed his review with the words "The score sounded clearly and well".

His first conducting experience was with the New York Little Symphony Orchestra at Carnegie Chamber Music Hall on December 21, 1945. He was chosen from 100 applicants to serve as an apprentice conductor to George Szell at the Cleveland Orchestra for 1946–1947. In 1946, he conducted what then was believed to be the premiere of Charles Ives Central Park in the Dark. This was in New York City with a student chamber orchestra from the Juilliard School at an all-Ives concert held at the McMillin Theatre at Columbia University. (Ives himself recalled an earlier performance – 1906 or 1907). Bloomfield was also the off-stage conductor for the premiere of Ives' The Unanswered Question at the same concert.

In 1947, he organized the Cleveland Little Symphony Orchestra which he directed until 1952. He was a finalist in the Eugene Ormandy contest in November 1948. In 1949, he organized the Civic Opera Workshop of Cleveland. At this time he was also the piano accompanist for Licia Albanese and on the staff of the Tanglewood Music Center.

In 1952 he traveled to Europe to conduct, living in Rome. He conducted the Palermo Massimo Theatre Orchestra in October, 1952. He led his first concert in Vienna in November, 1952 with the Vienna State Opera Orchestra in the Konzerthaus, Vienna.

Although he was engaged to Audrey Kupperstein in January 1947, he married Margery W. Bloomfield in 1953.

Bloomfield was the conductor of the Oregon Symphony 1955-1959 (he was one of the guest conductors for the orchestra in the 1954–1955 season). In four seasons in Portland, he introduced 62 works new to the orchestra audience. Prominent artists he invited to Portland included the pianists Artur Rubinstein and Rudolf Serkin, sopranos Birgit Nilsson and Elisabeth Schwarzkopf, and violinist Isaac Stern. The musicians considered him a strict conductor who was detail oriented. A new violist in the orchestra, Peggy Swafford, said this about the conductor who was her first: "I was a bit intimidated. He was meticulous, and he had every score memorized. But it was a joy. He had wonderful eyes, piercing, and you knew by the look that things were going well or not."

He was appointed conductor of the Rochester Philharmonic Orchestra on March 18, 1958. He served there for the 1959-1963 seasons. One of the works he premiered with that orchestra was Bernard Rogers “Variations on a Mussorgsky Song”, which was also recorded and released by Composers Recordings as CRI 153. He also conducted the Rochester Philharmonic for Everest Records including Sibelius' Symphony No. 5 and Finlandia on SDBR 3068 and a disc of Ravel and Debussy selections on SDBR 3060. He also conducted for MGM Records. Bloomfield had a difficult time in Rochester, managing to alienate many of the musicians, staff, and other members of the musical community during his time there.

In December 1961 he conducted for the first Dimitri Mitropoulos Music Competition in New York, serving as a last minute substitute for Josef Krips. New York Times critic Harold C. Schonberg praised him for handling “his young soloists flawlessly, working closely with them and seeing to it that their tempos and phrasings were accurately followed. It was a noble job”. He served as a judge for the Leventritt Prize in May 1962 and also for the first U.S.-based international conducting competition held in New York in March 1963. This was the second Mitropoulos competition (the first being for pianists). An Oregon Symphony conductor-to-be was one of the entrants here – James DePreist.

Bloomfield resigned from his position in Rochester amid acrimonious circumstances, claiming that "everyone was against him." In May 1964 he signed a three-year contract to become the conductor of the Hamburg State Opera 1964–1966, and he became the general music director of the Frankfort State Opera also for three years - 1966–1968. He guest conducted in Europe and also led the Berliner Symphoniker (West Berlin) 1975–1982.

Bloomfield retired to the Oregon Coast in 1990. He hosted a weekly classical music radio program on Astoria's KMUN. Theodore Bloomfield's final conducting engagement was with the Oregon Symphony in 1996, at a concert during the orchestra's centennial season. He died of a heart attack in Warrenton, Oregon. He was survived by his wife and their five children (Louise, Katherine, Charles, Margaret, and Joan). His wife said that although he conducted many modern works, his favorite composers were Beethoven and Mozart.

== Writings by Theodore Bloomfield ==
- ”In Search of Mahler's Tenth: The Four Performing Versions as Seen by a Conductor”, The Musical Quarterly, Vol. 74, No. 2 (1990), pp. 175–196
- ”Two Undetected Misprints in Mahler's 'Das Lied von der Erde'”, The Musical Times, Vol. 130, No. 1755 (May, 1989), pp. 266–267

Cultural offices
Preceded by James Sample	Conductor, Portland Symphony Orchestra; 1955–1959	Succeeded by Piero Bellugi
