= Piero Bellugi =

Italian conductor

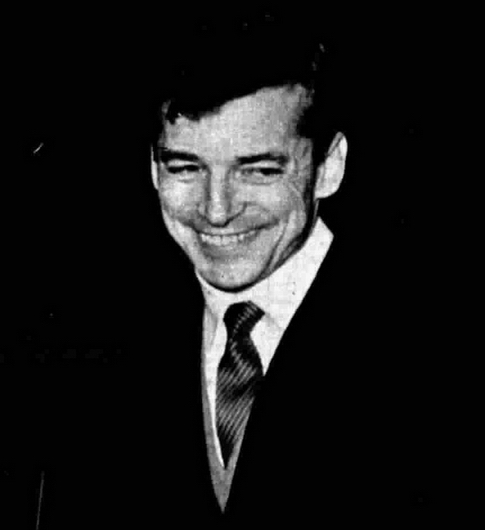
- Bellugi in Radiocorriere magazine, 1970.

Background information
- Born: 14 July 1924; Florence, Italy
- Died: 10 June 2012 (aged 87) Florence, Italy
- Occupation: Orchestral conductor
- Years active: 1951–2012

Piero Bellugi (14 July 1924 – 10 June 2012) was an Italian orchestral conductor.

== Life ==
Bellugi was born in Florence, in Tuscany, on 14 July 1924. He took a diploma in violin at the Conservatorio Luigi Cherubini in that city, studying under Gioacchino Maglioni. He studied conducting under Paul van Kempen at the Accademia Musicale Chigiana in Siena and under Igor Markevitch at the summer academy of the Universität Mozarteum Salzburg in Austria. In 1951, with the help of a study grant, he travelled to the United States, where he studied under William Steinberg and Rafael Kubelík, and at the Berkshire Music Center at Tanglewood under Leonard Bernstein. On 10 August 1951 he conducted a performance of Ma mère l'oye by Maurice Ravel there.

From 1954 to 1956 he was conductor of the Tri-City Symphony Orchestra in Davenport, Iowa. Between 1956 and 1961 he was resident conductor of the Oakland Symphony Orchestra and of the Portland Symphony Orchestra.

From 1960 he received invitations to conduct in Europe, and conducted the orchestra of the Rundfunk der DDR in Berlin, and the orchestra of La Scala in Milan, where his first performance was in the Serse of George Frideric Handel in 1962. He conducted the first performances of Darius Milhaud's Symphony No. 10 in 1961 and of the Settimo Concerto of Goffredo Petrassi in 1965. From 1969 to 1974 he was the resident conductor of the Orchestra Sinfonica di Torino della RAI, at that time one of four orchestras of the RAI, the national broadcaster. In 2004 he was appointed artistic director of the Teatro Massimo, the opera house of Palermo. As a guest he conducted the Aix-en-Provence Festival, the Vienna State Opera, the Orchestra dell'Accademia Nazionale di Santa Cecilia in Rome, the Lyric Opera of Chicago and the San Francisco Opera.

Piero Bellugi taught master-classes at several institutions including the Accademia Musicale Chigiana in Siena, the University of California, Berkeley, and the New England Conservatory of Music in Boston. From 1996 he gave classes at the Conservatorio Luigi Cherubini in Florence. He was also a permanent conductor of the Orchestra Giovanile Italiana and the Toscanini Orchestra of Parma.

He died in Florence on 10 June 2012.

== Family ==
In 1954 he married Ursula Herzberger. Their son David Bellugi was a recorder virtuoso. He had five children in all.

Cultural offices
Preceded by Theodore Bloomfield	Principal Conductor, Portland Symphony Orchestra; 1959–1961	Succeeded by Jacques Singer
