= Oregon Symphony =

Orchestra based in Portland, Oregon, U.S.

- Orchestra
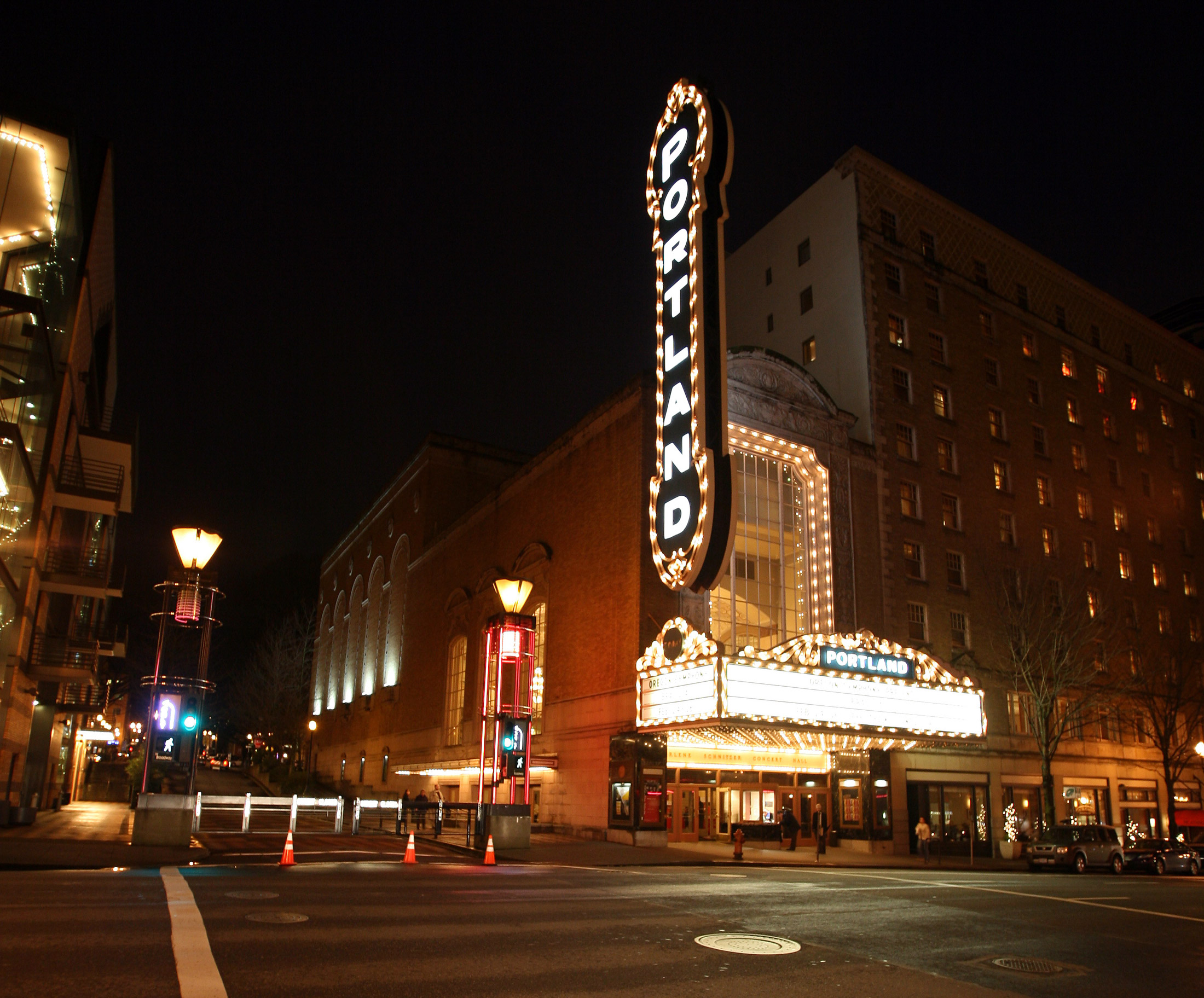
- The Arlene Schnitzer Concert Hall
- Founded: 1896
- Location: Portland, Oregon, U.S.
- Concert hall: Arlene Schnitzer Concert Hall
- Principal conductor: David Danzmayr
- Website: www.orsymphony.org

The Oregon Symphony is an American symphony orchestra based in Portland, Oregon, United States. Founded as the "Portland Symphony Society" in 1896, it is the sixth oldest orchestra in the United States, and oldest in the Western United States. Its home venue is the Arlene Schnitzer Concert Hall in downtown Portland's Cultural District.

== History ==
The precursor ensemble to the orchestra gave its first concert at the Marquam Grand Theatre on October 30, 1896, with W.H. Kinross conducting 33 performers. Included on the first program was Joseph Haydn's Surprise Symphony. By 1899, the orchestra was performing an annual concert series (with occasional lulls). In 1902, the orchestra made its first tour of the state. Orchestra members shared ticket revenues as a cooperative, and elected their conductors in the early years.

Royal Academy of Music-trained musician Carl Denton was a major force in helping the Portland Symphony Society enter a new era. The board of directors was elected and a manager hired. Orchestra members continued to elect their conductors for the 1911/1912 season. The order of conductor and concertmaster rotation was determined by drawing lots. Musicians were from the dance and theatre orchestras of Portland. Following fourteen rehearsals, the first concert of this new-era Portland Symphony Orchestra was held at 2:30 p.m. November 12, 1911, at the newly opened Heilig Theater at SW Broadway and Taylor street. Mose Christensen conducted 54 performers in Dvorak's Symphony No. 9 in E minor and other works. Carl Denton conducted the second concert on December 17, 1911, followed by John Bayley on January 21, 1912, and Harold C. Bayley (the son of John Bayley) on March 3, 1912. Mose Christensen completed that season with the fifth concert on April 14, 1912. Harold Bayley, Carl Denton, and Mose Christensen also served as rotating concertmasters when they weren't conducting. The entire budget was made up of door receipts, which were divided equally except that the conductor received two shares. For the first concert, each musician received $1.45.

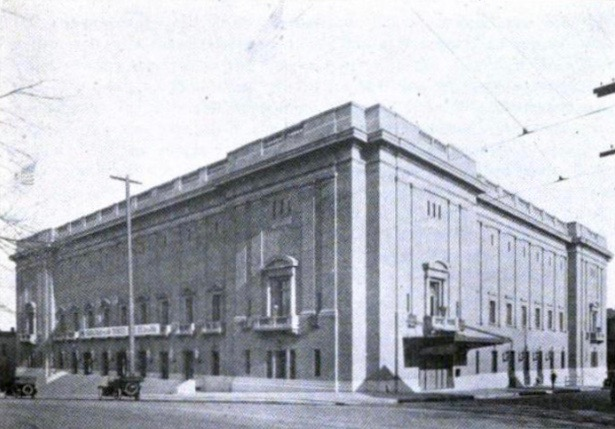
The Portland Public Auditorium (or Municipal Auditorium), circa 1918, shortly after opening

The orchestra continued to elect rotating conductors as leaders until the symphony board appointed Carl Denton as the first permanent conductor on August 18, 1918. The orchestra began holding its concerts at Municipal Auditorium, later renamed Civic Auditorium. Under Denton, ticket sales increased and the number of musicians were therefore increased.

Theodore Spiering, who had guest conducted the orchestra, was the next appointed conductor. Spiering was unable to begin his first season as conductor because of his untimely death in Munich (where he was searching for new scores for the orchestra). At the suggestion of artist manager Arthur Judson, the symphony board next appointed Dutch conductor Willem van Hoogstraten. Hoogstraten's first concert, on November 9, 1925, included Tchaikovsky's Symphony No. 4, performed by 69 musicians. Some of van Hoogstraten's concerts were nationally broadcast on the radio. The orchestra was now recognized as one of the fifteen largest in the nation.

During the Great Depression, the Portland Symphony Society nearly closed in 1931. A mimeographed letter to society members pleading for donations by Isabella Gauld kept the society open. The threat of war and a budget deficit of nearly $20,000 caused the board to suspend operations in 1938. A farewell concert on February 28, 1938, featured van Hoogstraten conducting the symphony and chorus in Brahms' German Requiem.

There was no regular symphony season between 1938 and 1947, except for occasional concerts. There was also a WPA Portland Federal Symphony Orchestra for one season of concerts held at the Neighbors of Woodcraft auditorium, beginning in January 1939. Misha Pelz, who had conducted the Portland Federal Symphony Band, was the regular conductor and Leslie Hodge guest conducted for two concerts.

An orchestra billed as the Portland Philharmonic, with 40 musicians provided by the federal music project, held its debut concert on January 16, 1940, with Hodge conducting. Hodge announced his resignation in September 1940 and Charles Lautrop succeeded him as conductor. Directors suspended operation of this orchestra on December 30, 1940.

== Reorganization ==
The Portland Symphony orchestra was reorganized in 1947 as a permanent professional group. Werner Janssen was engaged for two seasons as principal conductor, from 1947 to 1949, followed by James Sample (1949–1953). Guest conductors were engaged for the 1953–1955 seasons (in lieu of a principal conductor), including Carlos Chávez, Enrique Jordá, Dimitri Mitropoulos, Thomas Schippers, Boris Sirpo, Russell Stanger, and Igor Stravinsky. Theodore Bloomfield was one of these guest conductors, and he also became the next regular conductor (1955–1959). The Italian conductor Piero Bellugi (1959–1961) became only the second non-American principal conductor since Hoogstraten. Each of these early principal conductors in the reorganized symphony era left after only a few years because the orchestra lacked financial backing. Bellugi also refused to return for a scheduled guest conductor engagement in the spring of 1962, citing the programs lacked sufficient scope for his talents.

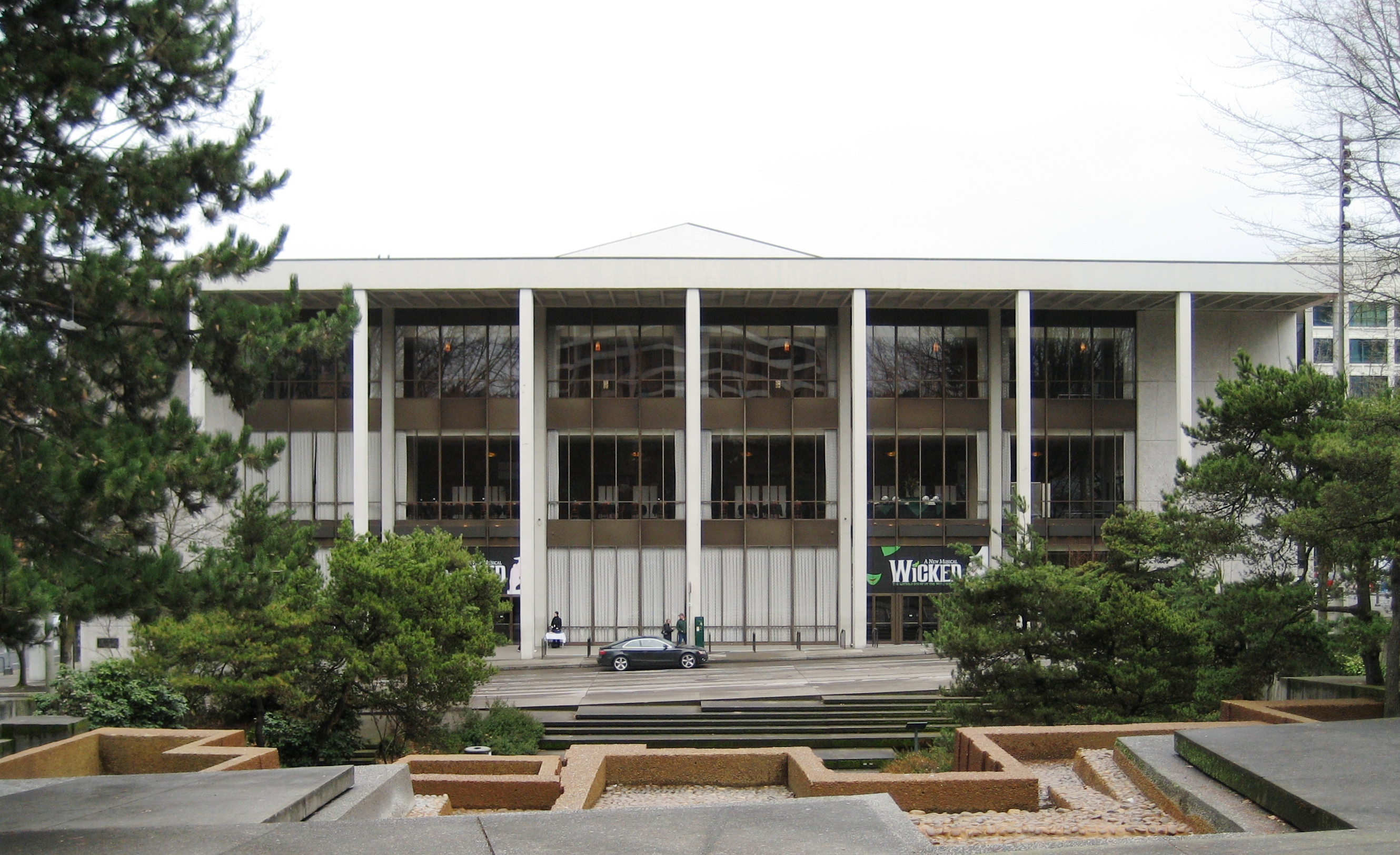
Rebuilt Civic Auditorium (now Keller Auditorium)

Jacques Singer was music director of the orchestra from 1962 to 1972. During 1965–1967, the orchestra performed in a leased 1927 movie house, the Oriental Theatre on SE Grand Avenue between Morrison and Belmont Streets, while the Civic Auditorium was being rebuilt. In July 1966, a $1.25 million Ford Foundation grant was announced. In August 1967, the name was changed to the Oregon Symphony Society (and Orchestra) to reflect the wider scope of the orchestra. In the fall of 1970, the symphony board and musicians' union successfully negotiated the first two-year contract. The musicians, seeking better wages, joined the International Conference of Symphony and Opera Musicians (ICSOM) in 1971.

In 1970, the Oregon Symphony Pops began a longstanding working relationship with conductor Norman Leyden, who was appointed associate conductor in January 1974. Leyden, who retired in May 2004, was honored with the lifetime title Laureate Associate Conductor.

In 1973, Lawrence Leighton Smith was selected as music director, the first conductor born in Portland to lead the orchestra. He led the orchestra until 1980.

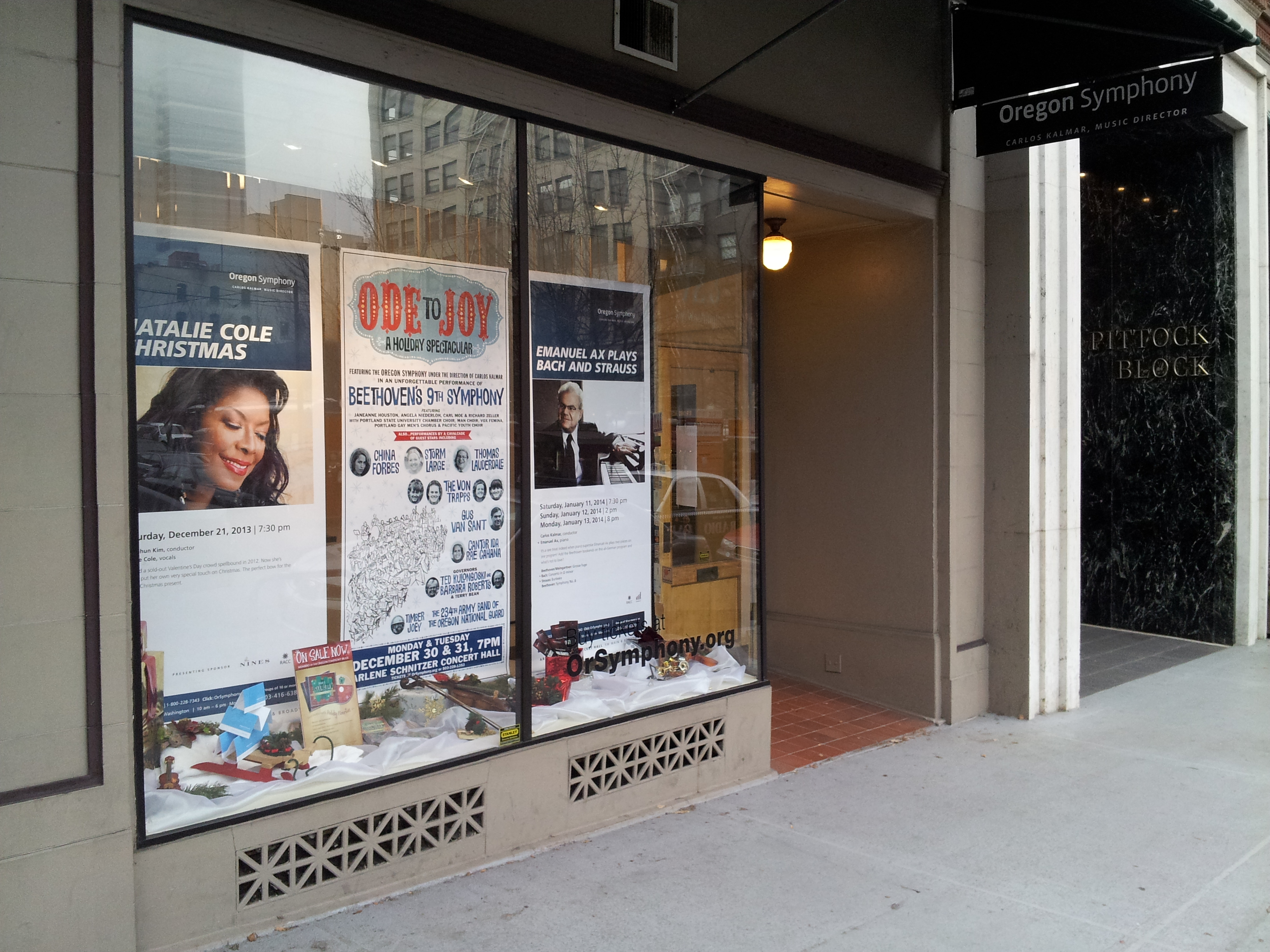
Entrance to the organization's ticket office, located in the Pittock Block, in 2013

James DePreist, one of the first African-American conductors, became the orchestra's conductor in 1980. In 1984, the orchestra went from part-time to full-time status. Also in 1984, the orchestra moved from Civic (now Keller) Auditorium to the Arlene Schnitzer Concert Hall. The orchestra was now able to rehearse in the same space where they performed their concerts. James DePreist's arrangement of the theme for The Cosby Show was recorded by the orchestra in May 1988 for use in the fifth season of that television program. The first out-of-state tour outside of the Pacific Northwest was made in September 1992, to the Hollywood Bowl at the invitation of the Los Angeles Philharmonic.

Although there were labor disagreements and brief lockouts by management in 1986 and 1989, in September 1996, the 86 musicians voted unanimously to strike for the first time. Money was the issue in negotiating a new contract. Five rehearsals and six concerts were canceled before a new four-year contract was negotiated before the end of September.

The orchestra's first Grammy nomination came in 2003. Principal percussionist Niel DePonte was nominated for best instrumental soloist performance with orchestra for Oregon composer Tomas Svoboda's "Concerto for Marimba and Orchestra", recorded by Albany Records in January 2000.

A 90-minute television special from CBS affiliate KOIN Channel 6, produced by John Ray and directed by Richard Hammerstrom, in honor of the symphony's centennial featured DePreist and the orchestra in a performance of Rachmaninoff's Symphony No. 2, and was awarded a Northwest Regional Emmy in June 1997.

DePreist remained as music director for 23 years, until 2003. His tenure saw the growth of the orchestra from a small, part-time group into a full-time nationally recognized orchestra. During his tenure, the orchestra released 17 recordings. After the end of his tenure, DePriest held the title of music director laureate until his death in 2013.

Carlos Kalmar became the orchestra's music director in 2003. In April 2008, the orchestra announced the extension of Kalmar's contract as music director to the 2012–2013 season. Kalmar concluded his Oregon Symphony tenure at the close of the 2020–2021 season.

In 2018, David Danzmayr first guest-conducted the orchestra. He returned in 2019 for an additional guest-conducting appearance. In February 2021, the orchestra announced the appointment of Danzmayr as its next music director, effective with the 2021–2022 season. In October 2025, the orchestra announced the extension of Danzmayr's contract as its music director through the 2028–2029 season.

== Recordings and discography ==
The Oregon Symphony began recording for the Delos label in 1987. A collection entitled Bravura, includes works by Witold Lutosławski, Ottorino Respighi, and Richard Strauss. Recordings have continued, with releases also on the Koch and Albany labels. Sixteen compact discs were issued through 2005.

In November 2011, the orchestra released Music for a Time of War, on the Pentatone label. Recorded at the Arlene Schnitzer Concert Hall in Portland, Oregon, with Carlos Kalmar conducting, the album features the program played at the orchestra's May 2011 Spring into Music Festival concert at Carnegie Hall. December 5, 2012, this album received two Grammy nominations: one for Best Engineered Album, Classical; and one for Best Orchestral Performance. Subsequent recordings were This England (2012), Spirit of the American Range (2015), Haydn Symphonies (2017), and Aspects of America (2018).

== Music directors ==
- David C. Rosebrook (1909)
- Carl Denton (1911)
- John Bayley (1912)
- George E. Jeffery (1913)
- Carl Denton (1914)
- John Bayley (1915)
- Waldemar Lind (1916)
- Mose Christensen (1917)
- Carl Denton (1918–1925)
- Theodore Spiering (1925)
- Willem van Hoogstraten (1925–1938)
- Werner Janssen (1947–1949)
- James Sample (1949–1953)
- Theodore Bloomfield (1955–1959)
- Piero Bellugi (1959–1961)
- Jacques Singer (1962–1972)
- Lawrence Leighton Smith (1973–1980)
- James DePreist (1980–2003)
- Carlos Kalmar (2003–2021)
- David Danzmayr (2021–present)

== Concertmasters ==
- Jno F. N. Colburn (1922–1924)
- Alf Keller (1924–1927)
- Ed Hurlimann (1927–1938)
- John Copin (1947–1948)
- Tibor Zelig (1948–1949)
- Hugh Ewart (1950–1973)
- Michael Foxman (1973–2003 )
- Amy Schwartz Moretti (2004–2007)
- Jun Iwasaki (2007–2011)
- Sarah Kwak (2012–present)

== See also ==
- Culture of Portland, Oregon

== Sources ==
- "Conductor Backs Out of Guest Spot, Program 'Beyond His Dignity',?" Oregonian, April 11, 1962 (Bellugi is the conductor).
- Goodrich, Frederick W. "Nearly 70 Eventful Years of Orchestral Music". The Oregonian, November 3, 1935, page 11.
- Goodrich, Frederick W. "Oregon Orchestra Music, 1868–1932" Oregon Historical Quarterly, June 1932, pages 136–142.
- Millard, Robert E. "The Birth of the Portland Symphony Orchestra". Aired on KPAM radio station on September 30, 1962.
- Noles, B. J. "Bayley Musical Library Donated for University Use". The Oregonian, June 12, 1968, section II, page 7.
- Programs of the WPA Portland Federal Symphony Orchestra 1938–1939
- Programs of the Portland Symphony Orchestra and Oregon Symphony 1896–
- Wallin, J. L. "Half Century of Portland's Symphony". The Oregonian, October 20, 1935.
