= Henry Schradieck =

German musician (1846–1918)

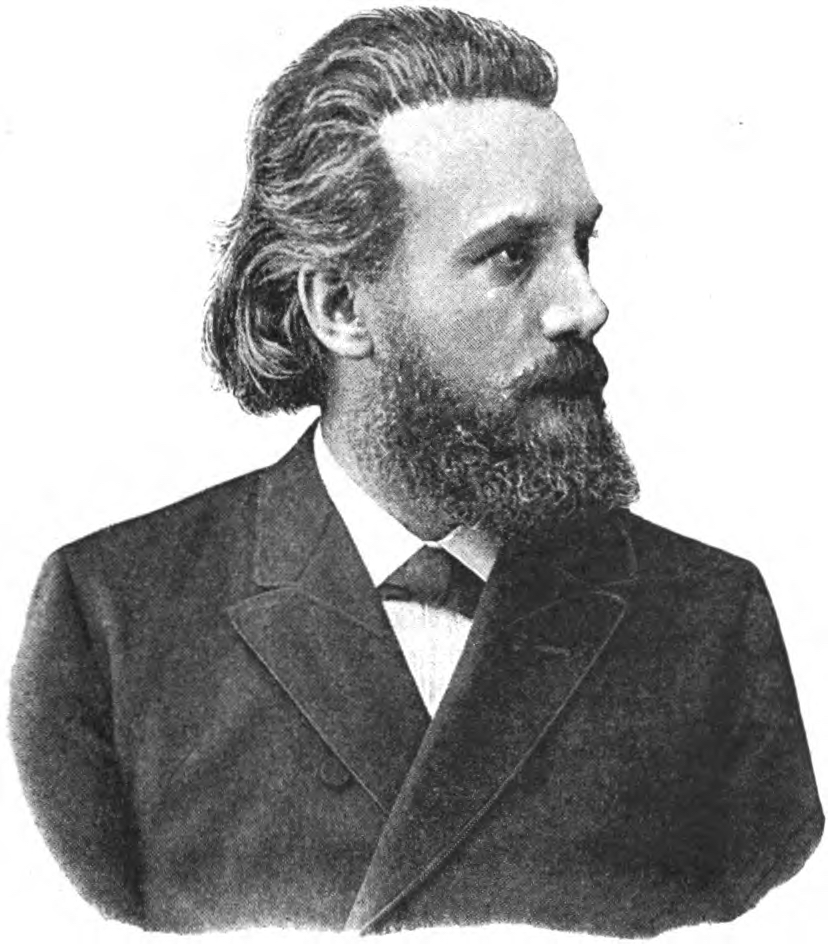
Henry Schradieck

Henry Schradieck (29 April 1846 – 25 May 1918) was a German violinist, music pedagogue and composer. He was one of the foremost violin teachers of his day. He wrote a series of etude books for the violin which are still in common use today.

== Biography ==
Born in Hamburg, he received his first violin lessons from his father, and made his first public appearance at the age of six. He studied under Hubert Léonard, at Royal Conservatory of Brussels, where he gained first prize. Afterwards he went to Leipzig, where he became a pupil of Ferdinand David. In 1863 he became a soloist at the Reinthaler concerts at Bremen. The following year he went to Moscow as Professor of the violin. In 1868 Schradieck returned to Hamburg, to take up the position of conductor of the Philharmonic Society, vacated by Leopold Auer. After six years he became concertmaster at the Gewandhaus Orchestra in Leipzig, professor at the Leipzig Conservatory, and leader of the theater orchestra.

In need of a complete change, he left Leipzig for Cincinnati, Ohio, where he taught at the College of Music of Cincinnati, and also organized a symphony orchestra. In 1889 he took up his old position at Hamburg, besides teaching at the Hamburg Conservatory. Subsequently he returned to America, becoming a teacher in New York City, and in Philadelphia. He was a member of the Beta chapter of Phi Mu Alpha Sinfonia fraternity at Combs College of Music, initiated in either 1900 or 1906, and was active in the Fraternity's New York Alumni Club. In addition to writing pedagogic material for the violin in the way of studies and finger exercises, and earning the reputation of being one of the foremost violin teachers of that day, he also interested himself in matters connected with the making of violins.

Schradieck's notable students include Maud Powell, Ottokar Nováček, Walter B. Rogers, Max Donner, Norman Black, and Theodore Spiering. See: List of music students by teacher: R to S#Henry Schradieck.
