= Emil Baré =

Hungarian violinist (1870–1943)

Emil Baré

Emil Baré, real name Emil Barach (8 September 1870 – 29 March 1943) was a Hungarian violinist.

== Life ==
Baré was born in Vienna from Hungarian Jewish parents. His father was Sigmund Barach (b. 1842), and his mother was Rosa Barach (née Gottlob, 1841–1913), writer and pedagogue. In 1886, at the age of 16, he renounced the Jewish faith and changed his surname Barach to Baré. He studied at the Universität für Musik und darstellende Kunst Wien with Joseph Hellmesberger Jr. and then at the Conservatoire de Paris with Lambert Massart. He then worked in Paris in the late 1890s as concertmaster of the Paris Opera. From 1897 to 1902 he was second concertmaster of the Chicago Symphony Orchestra. He also played in the Orchestre Lamoureux and worked at the opera houses in Mainz and Cologne. In spring 1903, he became concertmaster of the Hungarian State Opera House in Budapest and in 1910 teacher for violin and later professor at the Franz Liszt Academy of Music.

On 20 April 1916, Baré performed the solo violin in the first part of (Une idéale) and Two Portraits Op. 5 by Béla Bartók together with the Orchestra of the Budapest Opera conducted by István Strasser, the two movements being performed together for the first time.
