= Max Donner =

American violinist and composer 1883/4 – 1962)

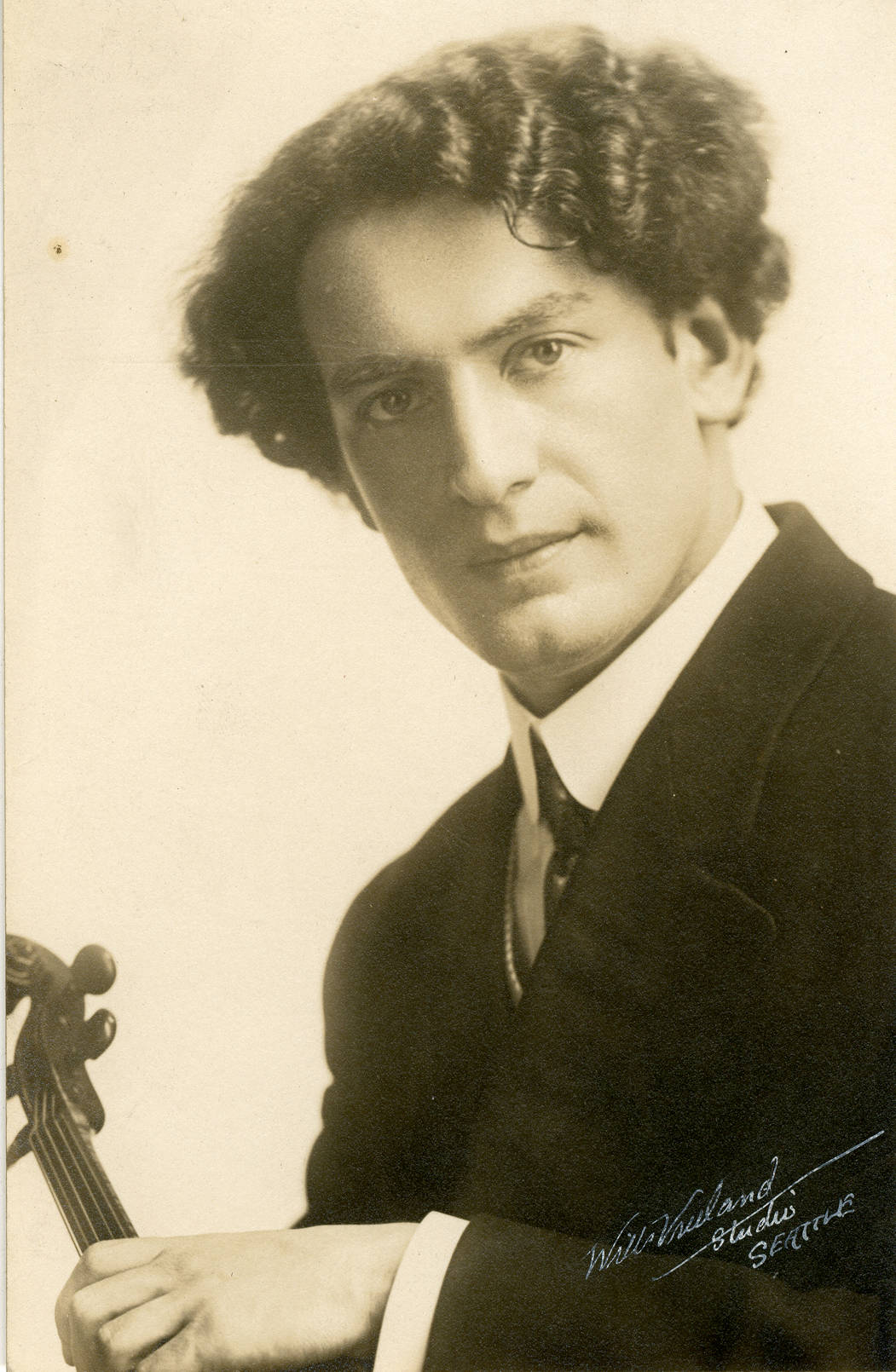
Donner in 1914

Max Donner (22 May 1883/4 – 30 May 1962) was an American violinist, composer, conductor, and teacher of violin, chamber music, and composition.

== Life and career ==
The son of Adolph and Bertha Donner, he grew up in New York City and studied violin with Henry Schradieck. At age fifteen, Donner traveled to Europe and studied at Berlin's Stern Conservatory under Gustav Hollaender (violin) and Hans Pfitzner (composition). At Stern, Donner was the first American to be awarded the Gustav Hollaender Medal. He then studied with César Thomson and Eugène Ysaÿe in Brussels, where he won first prize in violin at the Royal Conservatory of Brussels.

Following a tour of Europe as a violin soloist, Donner returned to the United States, where he continued to give recitals, including with Ernestine Schumann-Heink. After playing violin in the Philadelphia Orchestra from 1907 to 1908, Donner served as the concertmaster of the Seattle Symphony under the direction of conductor Henry Kimball Hadley.

From 1918 to 1923, Donner was head of violin and ensemble at West Virginia University and director of the University Philharmonic Orchestra. He then moved to California, where he joined the violin section of the Los Angeles Philharmonic and Hollywood Bowl Orchestra and taught violin, at one time heading the violin department of the Los Angeles Conservatory of Music. As a conductor, Donner worked with Los Angeles’ WPA Federal Symphony Orchestra, and led the Los Angeles Philharmonic in performances of his own orchestral compositions. He also gave composition lessons.

In 1936, Pierre Monteux premiered Donner's Chinese Rhapsody with the San Francisco Symphony Orchestra.

Donner's wife, Angeline, was a pianist with whom he had five children. She performed with him in recitals. Donner died in 1962.

== Compositions ==
Early on, Donner published compositions for violin and piano with Carl Fischer, including a Sonata for violin and piano, Op. 40 (1908). In The Literature of Chamber Music (1997), Arthur Cohn writes of the sonata:

Donner's music has the darker aspects of Rachmaninoff's. It has strong melodic characteristics, and these are impressively detailed, always with the full sweep of violin lyricism and in dialogue and combination with rich textural material for the piano.

He also wrote violin concertos; orchestral works, including Lyster Symphony in D minor, symphonic poems, suites, and overtures; and additional chamber music.

== Sheet music collection ==
Donner's manuscripts and music collection are contained in the Max Donner Collection of Sheet Music at the University of Tennessee, Knoxville.
