= Tutzing =

- Municipality
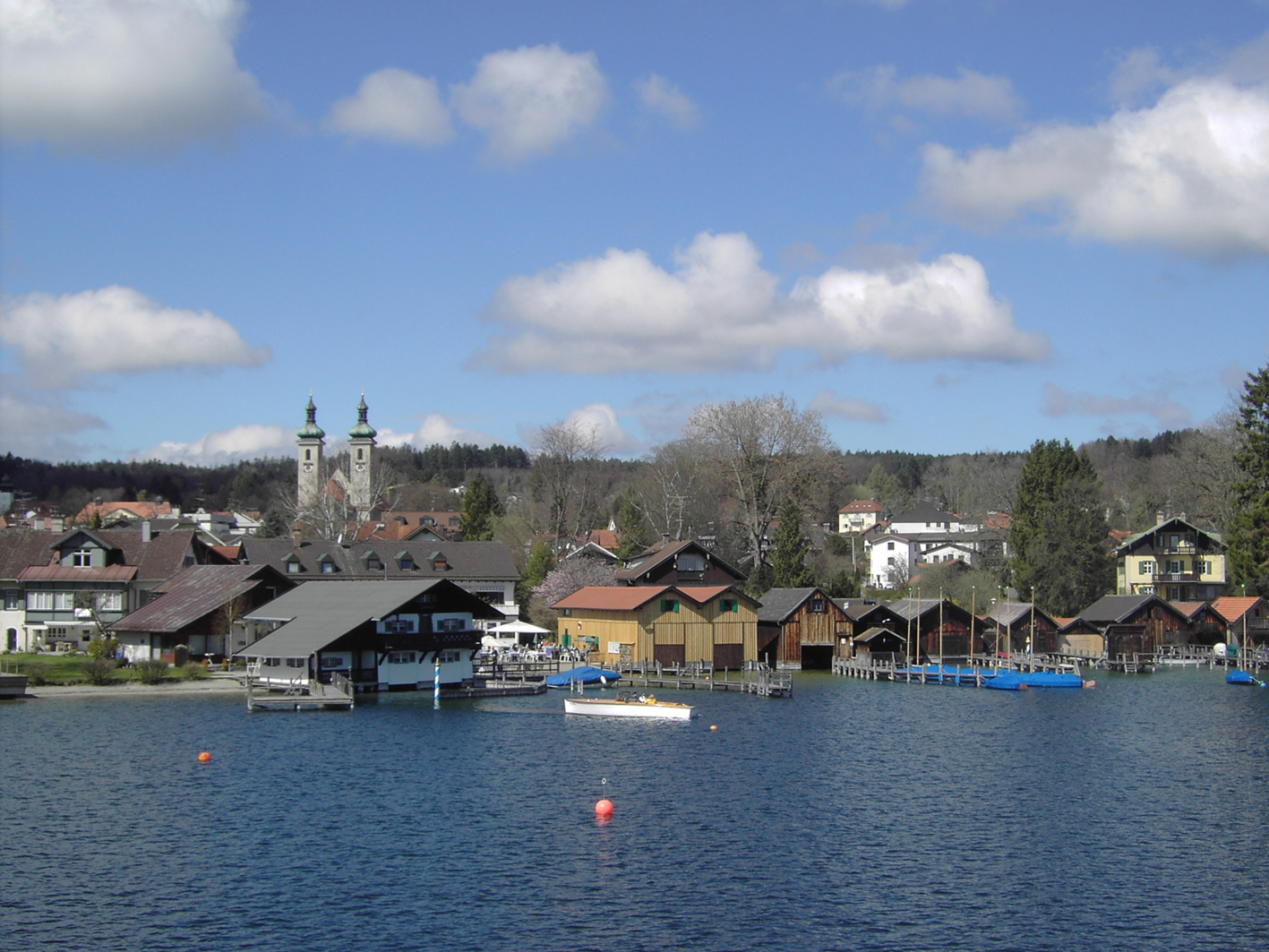
- Tutzing

- Coat of arms

- Location of Tutzing within Starnberg district
- Interactive map of Tutzing
- Location within Germany Location within Bavaria
- Coordinates: 47°54′32″N 11°16′53″E
- Country: Germany
- State: Bavaria
- Admin. region: Oberbayern
- District: Starnberg

Government
  - Mayor (2023–29): Ludwig Horn (CSU)

Area
  - Total: 35.65 km^{2} (13.76 sq mi)
- Elevation: 611 m (2,005 ft)

Population (2025-12-31)
  - Total: 10,054
  - Density: 282.0/km^{2} (730.4/sq mi)
- Time zone: UTC+01:00 (CET)
  - Summer (DST): UTC+02:00 (CEST)
- Postal codes: 82327
- Dialling codes: 08158
- Vehicle registration: STA
- Website: www.tutzing.de

Tutzing (German pronunciation: [ˈtʊtsɪŋ]) is a municipality in the district of Starnberg in Bavaria, Germany, on the west bank of the Starnberger See. Just 40 km south-west of Munich and with good views of the Alps, the town was traditionally a favourite holiday spot for those living in the city.

In 1873 Johannes Brahms spent four summer months in Tutzing, completing his String Quartets Opus 51 and writing the Haydn Variations. A small lakeside park is dedicated to him, and a plaque stands near the large house where he lived and worked.

The town of 10,000 is home to many commuters to Munich, as well as to retirees. Tutzing station is both a terminus of Munich's S-Bahn rail network and a regional train hub serving Innsbruck, Mittenwald, Garmisch-Partenkirchen, Reutte, Kochel and Oberammergau.

Tutzing has a regional hospital and various clinics. It hosts the conference centre Evangelische Akademie Tutzing, founded in 1947.

Tutzing has been home to various German celebrities, including the former president of the Federal Constitutional Court Hans-Jürgen Papier, musicians Peter Maffay, Leslie Mándoki, and Elly Ney, the late Guido Dessauer, and the military general and theorist Erich Ludendorff, who died and is buried in the town.

During the Nazi period, Trutskirch-Tutzing (Dornier), a forced-labour factory for the Dornier-Werke GmbH aircraft concern, was a sub-camp of Dachau Concentration Camp. The town was also a stop on the "trail of tears" of inmates forcibly marched south in 1945; a plaque at the town hall commemorates them.

== Personalities related to Tutzing ==
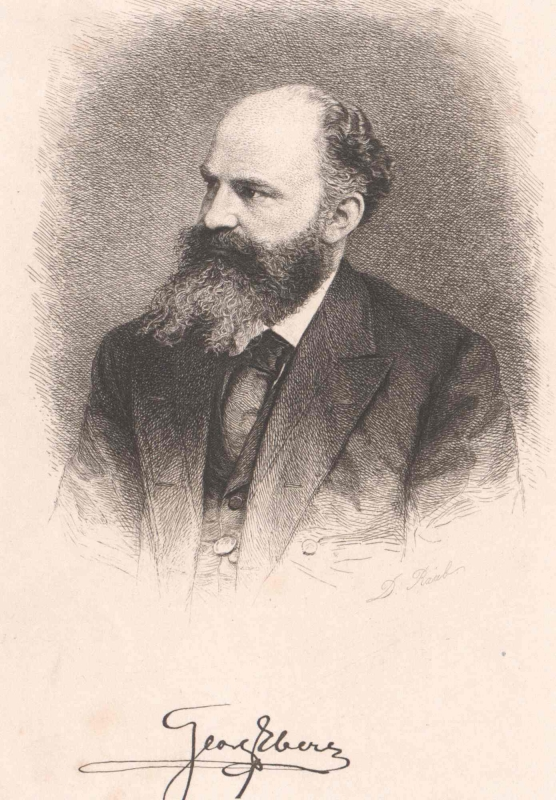
Georg Ebers

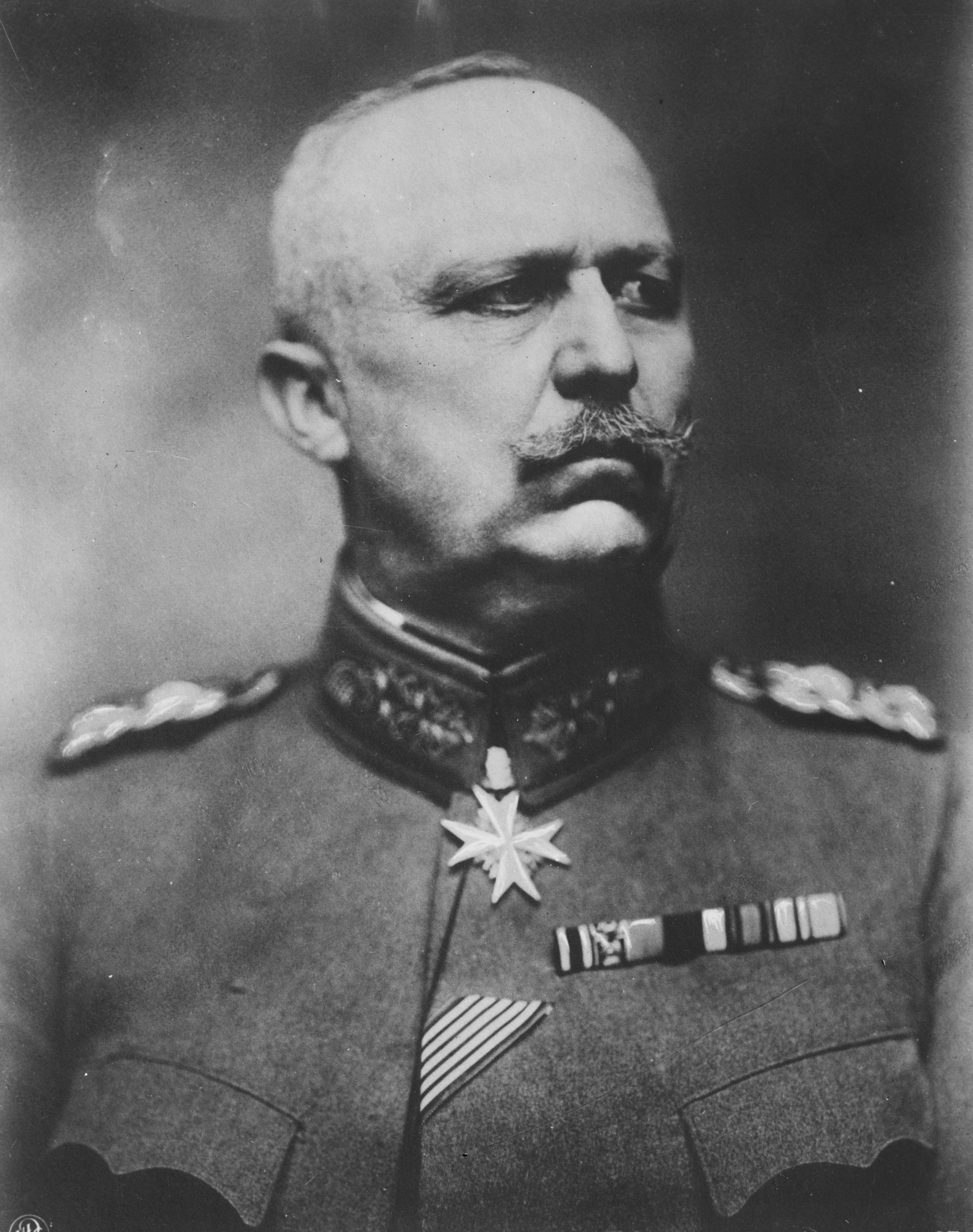
Erich Ludendorff

- Georg Ebers (1837–1898), Egyptologist and writer
- Heinz Engelmann (1911–1996), actor and synchronsprecher, lived and died in Tutzing
- Peter Hamm (1937-2019), poet, author, journalist, editor, and literary critic.
- Marianne Koch (born 1931), actress and a doctor
- Gitta Lind (1925–1974), musician
- Sabine Leutheusser-Schnarrenberger (born 1951), politician (FDP),(deputy bureau in Tutzing, lives in Feldafing)
- Erich Ludendorff (1865–1937), general of World War I, politician, and agitator for the ethnic movement
- Mathilde Ludendorff (1877–1966), teacher, doctor and writer (her third husband was Erich Ludendorff)
- Peter Maffay (born 1949), musician
- Leslie Mandoki (born 1953), musician and music producer
- Christof Mauch (born 1960), historian
- Elly Ney (1882–1968), pianist
- Eugen Ott (1889–1977), German ambassador to Japan during the early years of World War II, died in Tutzing
- Hans-Jürgen Papier (born 1943), until March 2010 President of the Federal Constitutional Court
- Vajiralongkorn (born 1952), current King of Thailand, who owns a villa in the town.
- Prince Waldemar of Prussia (1889–1945) (1889–1945), died in Tutzing and buried
- Sabina Sesselmann (1936–1998), actress, lived and died in Tutzing
- Michael Roll (born 1961), theater and television actor
- Gert Wilden (1917–2015), composer
