= List of awards and nominations received by Leonard Bernstein =

Leonard Bernstein awards and nominations
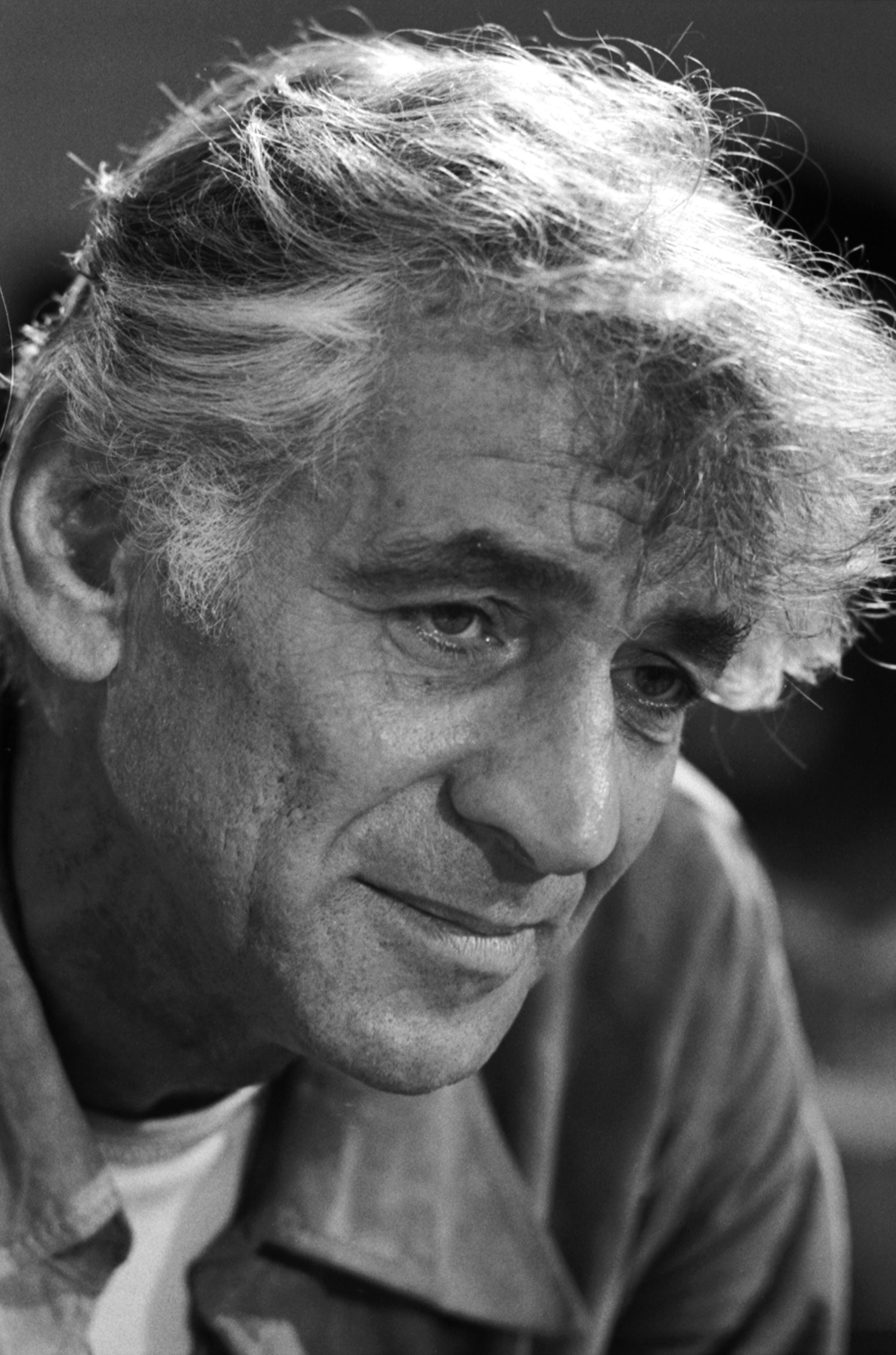
Awards and nominations
Award	Wins	Nominations
Academy Awards	0	1
Emmy Awards	7	13
Grammy Awards	16	63
Tony Awards	2	4

Leonard Bernstein (1918–1990) was an American composer and conductor.

Over the course of his distinguished career he won 16 Grammy Awards (including one for Lifetime Achievement), 7 Emmy Awards and 2 Tony Awards over his lifetime. His awards are both for his conducting and his compositions. He also received a nomination for the Academy Award for Best Original Score for his work on the Elia Kazan drama film On the Waterfront (1954).

Bernstein is also a member of both the American Theater Hall of Fame and the Television Hall of Fame. In 2015, he was inducted into the Legacy Walk. He received the Kennedy Center Honor in 1980 and was offered but declined the National Medal of the Arts.

He also received numerous honors including the Fellow of the American Academy of Arts and Sciences, 1951 the Fellow at the MacDowell 1962, 1970, 1972, the Sonning Award (Denmark) in 1965, the Ditson Conductor's Award in 1958, the George Peabody Medal – Johns Hopkins University in 1980, the Ernst von Siemens Music Prize in 1987, the Royal Philharmonic Society Gold Medal (UK) in 1987, the Edward MacDowell Medal in 1987, Praemium Imperiale in 1990

== Major associations ==
=== Academy Awards ===
The Academy Awards, or "Oscars", are a set of awards given annually for excellence of cinematic achievements. The awards, organized by the Academy of Motion Picture Arts and Sciences (AMPAS), were first held in 1929 at the Hollywood Roosevelt Hotel.

Year	Category	Nominated work	Result	Ref.
1954	Music Score of a Dramatic or Comedy Picture	On the Waterfront	Nominated	

=== Emmy Award ===
The Emmy Award, often referred to simply as the Emmy, recognizes excellence in the television industry.

Primetime Emmy Award
Year	Category	Nominated work	Result	Ref.
1957	Best Male Personality- Continuing Performance	Himself	Nominated	
1957	Best Musical Contribution for Television	Omnibus	Won	
1958	Best Musical Contribution for Television	Omnibus	Won	
1961	Outstanding Achievement in the Field of Music for Television	Leonard Bernstein and the New York Philharmonic	Won	
1965	Outstanding Musical Program	New York Philharmonic Young People's Concerts with Leonard Bernstein	Won	
1972	Outstanding Variety or Musical Program – Classical Music	Bernstein on Beethoven: A Celebration in Vienna	Won	
1973	Outstanding Single Program – Classical Music	Bernstein in London Special of the Week	Nominated	
1975	Outstanding Classical Music Program	Bernstein at Tanglewood	Nominated	
1976	Outstanding Classical Music Program	Bernstein and The New York Philharmonic	Won	
1982	Outstanding Classical Program in the Performing Arts	Bernstein/Beethoven	Nominated	
1984	Outstanding Classical Program in the Performing Arts	Bernstein: Conductor, Soloist and Teacher	Nominated	
1985	Outstanding Classical Program in the Performing Arts	Bernstein Conducts "West Side Story"	Nominated	
1987	Outstanding Individual Achievement – Classical Music-Dance Programming- Performing	Carnegie Hall: The Grand Reopening	Won	

=== Grammy Award ===
The Grammy Awards are awarded annually by The Recording Academy of the United States (formerly the National Academy of Recording Arts and Sciences or NARAS) for outstanding achievements in the music industry. Often considered the highest music honor, the awards were established in 1958.

Year	Category	Nominated work	Result	Ref.
1958	Best Classical Performance – Orchestra	Stravinsky: Le Sacre Du Printemps	Nominated	
1960	Best Classical Performance – Orchestra	Ives: Symphony No. 2	Nominated	
1961	Best Classical Performance – Choral (other than opera)	Beethoven: Missa Solemnis	Nominated	
1961	Album of the Year- Classical	Bloch: Sacred Service	Nominated	
1961	Best Recording for Children	Prokofiev: Peter and the Wolf	Won	
1961	Best Spoken Word Recording	Humor in Music	Won	
1962	Best Classical Performance – Choral (other than opera)	Mahler: Symphony No. 3 In D Minor	Nominated	
1962	Best Classical Performance – Orchestra	Mahler: Symphony No. 3 In D Minor	Nominated	
1962	Best Recording for Children	Saint-Saëns: Carnival of the Animals/Britten: Young Person's Guide to the Orchestra	Won	
1962	Best Spoken Word Recording	First Performance: Lincoln Center For The Performing Arts	Nominated	
1963	Best Classical Performance – Choral (other than opera)	Bach: St. Matthew Passion	Nominated	
1963	Best Classical Performance – Choral (other than opera)	Milhaud: Les Choephores	Nominated	
1963	Best Performance by a Chorus	The Joy of Christmas	Nominated	
1963	Best Recording for Children	Bernstein Conducts for Young People	Won	
1964	Best Classical Performance – Orchestra	Mahler: Symphony No. 2 In C Minor ("Resurrection")	Nominated	
1964	Best Composition by a Contemporary Composer	Bernstein: Symphony No. 3 "Kaddish"	Nominated	
1964	Album of the Year- Classical	Bernstein: Symphony No. 3 "Kaddish"	Won	
1965	Best Composition by a Contemporary Composer	Chichester Psalms	Nominated	
1966	Best Classical Performance – Orchestra	Ives: Fourth Of July	Nominated	
1967	Best Classical Performance – Orchestra	Das Lied von der Erde	Nominated	
1967	Album of the Year- Classical	Das Lied von der Erde	Nominated	
1967	Album of the Year- Classical	The World of Charles Ives (Robert Browning Overture)	Nominated	
1967	Album of the Year- Classical	Mahler: Symphony No. 8 (Symphony of a Thousand)	Won	
1967	Best Opera Recording	Falstaff	Nominated	
1967	Best Classical Performance – Choral (other than opera)	Mahler: Symphony No. 8 in E Flat Major (Symphony of a Thousand)	Won	
1968	Best Classical Performance – Orchestra	Mahler: Symphony No. 6 in A Minor and Symphony No. 9 in D Major	Nominated	
1968	Best Choral Performance (other than opera)	Haydn: The Creation	Nominated	
1972	Album of the Year- Classical	Bernstein: Mass	Nominated	
1972	Best Choral Performance – Classical (other than opera)	Bernstein: Mass	Nominated	
1972	Best Opera Recording	Strauss: Der Rosenkavalier	Nominated	
1973	Best Classical Performance – Orchestra	Holst: The Planets	Nominated	
1973	Best Choral Performance – Classical (other than opera)	Haydn: Mass In Time Of War (Leonard Bernstein's Concert For Peace)	Nominated	
1973	Best Classical Album	Bizet: Carmen	Nominated	
1973	Best Opera Recording	Bizet: Carmen	Won	
1974	Best Classical Performance – Orchestra	Bernstein Conducts Ravel	Nominated	
1974	Best Classical Performance – Orchestra	Mahler: Symphony No. 2 in C Minor	Nominated	
1974	Best Classical Album	Mahler: Symphony No. 2 in C Minor	Nominated	
1975	Best Choral Performance – Classical (other than opera)	Haydn: Harmoniemesse	Nominated	
1976	Best Choral Performance – Classical (other than opera)	Berlioz: Requiem	Nominated	
1977	Best Classical Album	Concert of the Century	Won	
1978	Best Choral Performance – Classical (other than opera)	Haydn: Mass No. 9 In D Minor ("Lord Nelson Mass")	Nominated	
1978	Best Choral Performance – Classical (other than opera)	Stravinsky: Les Noces and Mass	Nominated	
1979	Best Choral Performance – Classical (other than opera)	Beethoven: Missa solemnis	Nominated	
1980	Best Orchestral Recording	Beethoven: Symphony No. 9	Nominated	
1980	Best Orchestral Recording	Shostakovich: Symphony No. 5	Nominated	
1983	Best Orchestral Recording	Bernstein: Symphonic Dances from West Side Story; Candide Overture / Barber: Adagio For Strings/ Schuman: American Festival Overture	Nominated	
1983	Best Opera Recording	Wagner: Tristan und Isolde	Nominated	
1983	Best Classical Performance – Instrumental Soloist	Gershwin: Rhapsody in Blue	Nominated	
1985	Lifetime Achievement Award		Won	
1987	Best Orchestral Recording	Copland: Symphony No. 3/Quiet City	Nominated	
1988	Best Classical Album	Mahler: Symphony No. 2 in C Minor "Resurrection"	Nominated	
1988	Best Orchestral Recording	Mahler: Symphony No. 2 in C Minor "Resurrection"	Nominated	
1988	Best Opera Recording	Puccini: La bohème	Nominated	
1988	Best Opera Recording	Bernstein/Stephen Wadsworth: A Quiet Place	Nominated	
1988	Best Contemporary Composition	Bernstein/Stephen Wadsworth: A Quiet Place	Nominated	
1989	Best Orchestral Performance	Mahler: Symphony No. 3 in D Minor	Won	
1990	Best Contemporary Composition	Bernstein: Arias & Barcarolles	Won	
1990	Best Classical Album	Ives: Symphony No. 2; Gong on the Hook and Ladder; Central Park in the Dark; The Unanswered Question	Won	
1990	Best Orchestral Performance	Ives: Symphony No. 2; Gong on the Hook and Ladder; Central Park in the Dark; The Unanswered Question	Nominated	
1990	Best Orchestral Performance	Shostakovich: Symphonies Nos. 1 & 7	Won	
1990	Best Long Form Music Video	Bernstein In Berlin-Beethoven: Sym. No. 9	Nominated	
1991	Best Classical Album	Bernstein: Candide	Won	
1992	Best Classical Album	Mahler: Symphony No. 9	Won	
1992	Best Orchestral Performance	Mahler: Symphony No. 9	Won	

=== Tony Awards ===
The Tony Awards recognize achievements in Broadway theatre. The awards, presented by the American Theatre Wing and The Broadway League, were first held in 1947 at the Waldorf Astoria New York.

Year	Category	Nominated work	Result	Ref.
1953	Best Musical	Wonderful Town	Won	
1957	Best Musical	Candide	Nominated	
1958	Best Musical	West Side Story	Nominated	
1969	Special Tony Award		Won	

== Honorary accolades ==
=== Kennedy Center Honors ===
Year	Nominated work	Category	Result
1980	Himself	Kennedy Center Honors	Won

=== National Medal of Arts ===
Year	Nominated work	Category	Result
1989	Himself	National Medal of Arts	Declined

In 1989, Leonard Bernstein refused his award, allegedly due to how a federal grant to an art show on AIDS had been revoked.

== See also ==
- List of EGOT winners
