= Grammy Award for Best Orchestral Performance =

Grammy award category since 1959

- Awarded for: Quality orchestral performances
- Country: United States
- Presented by: National Academy of Recording Arts and Sciences
- First award: 1959
- Currently held by: Andris Nelsons (conductor); Boston Symphony Orchestra, "Messiaen: Turangalîla-Symphonie" (2026)
- Website: grammy.com

The Grammy Award for Best Orchestral Performance has been awarded since 1959. There have been several minor changes to the name of the award over this time:

- From 1959 to 1964 it was awarded as Best Classical Performance - Orchestra
- In 1965 it was Best Performance - Orchestra
- From 1966 to 1975 it returned to 'Best Classical Performance - Orchestra
- From 1977 to 1978 it was awarded as Best Classical Orchestral Performance
- From 1980 to 1981 it was awarded as Best Classical Orchestral Recording
- In 1983 it was awarded as Best Orchestral Performance
- In 1984 it was awarded as Best Orchestral Recording
- From 1985 to 1987 it returned to being called Best Classical Orchestral Recording
- From 1988 to 1989 it was once again called Best Orchestral Recording
- From 1990 to the present it has returned to being called Best Orchestral Performance

Years reflect the year in which the Grammy Awards were presented, for works released in the previous year.

Until 1989, the Grammy Award went to the conductor only, but since then, the Orchestra has also been given an award (although the orchestras are not always mentioned as a nominee).

== Recipients ==
Year^{[I]}	Recipients(s)	Work	Nominees (Conductors are identified with "cd")	Ref.
1959	Felix Slatkin conducting the Hollywood Bowl Orchestra	"Gaîté Parisienne"	Charles Münch conducting the Boston Symphony Orchestra – Barber: Meditation and Dance of Vengeance; Bruno Walter conducting the Columbia Symphony Orchestra – Beethoven: Symphony No. 6 in F Major; Pierre Monteux conducting the London Symphony Orchestra – Rimsky-Korsakov: Scheherazade; Leonard Bernstein conducting the New York Philharmonic – Stravinsky: Le Sacre Du Primtemps	
1960	Charles Münch conducting the Boston Symphony Orchestra	"Debussy: Images for Orchestra"	Pierre Monteux conducting the Vienna Philharmonic – Beethoven: Symphony No. 6; Fritz Reiner conducting the Chicago Symphony Orchestra – Rossini: Overture; Morton Gould conducting His Orchestra – Tchaikovsky: 1812 Overture; Ravel: Bolero	
1961	Fritz Reiner conducting the Chicago Symphony Orchestra	"Bartók: Music for Strings, Percussion and Celesta"	Aaron Copland conducting the Boston Symphony Orchestra – Copland: Appalachian Spring; Morton Gould conducting the Morton Gould Orchestra – Grofé: Grand Canyon Suite; Thomas Beecham conducting the Royal Philharmonic – Haydn: Solomon Symphonies, Vol. 2; Leonard Bernstein conducting the New York Philharmonic – Ives: Symphony No. 2	
1962	Charles Münch conducting the Boston Symphony Orchestra	"Ravel: Daphnis et Chloé"	Herbert von Karajan conducting the Philharmonia Orchestra – Bartók: Music for Strings, Percussion and Celesta; Hindemith: Mathis der Mahler; Bruno Walter conducting the Columbia Symphony Orchestra – Bruckner: Symphony No. 4 in E Flat Major; Wagner: Tannhauser Overture and Venusberg Music; Fritz Reiner conducting the Chicago Symphony – Strauss: Don Juan; Debussy: La Mer; George Szell conducting the Cleveland Orchestra – Strauss: Don Quixote	
1963	Igor Stravinsky conducting the Columbia Symphony Orchestra	"Stravinsky: The Firebird Ballet"	Otto Klemperer conducting the Philharmonia Orchestra – Bruckner: Symphony No. 7 in E Major; Leonard Bernstein conducting the New York Philharmonic – Mahler: Symphony No. 3 in D Minor; Bruno Walter conducting the Columbia Symphony Orchestra – Mahler: Symphony No. 9 in D Minor; Fritz Reiner conducting the Chicago Symphony Orchestra – Strauss: Also Sprach Zarathustra, Op. 30	
1964	Erich Leinsdorf conducting the Boston Symphony Orchestra	"Bartók: Concerto for Orchestra"	Fritz Reiner conducting the Chicago Symphony Orchestra – Beethoven: Symphony No. 6 in F Major, Op. 68 (Pastorale); Herbert von Karajan conducting the Berlin Philharmonic – Beethoven: The 9 Symphonies (Complete); George Szell conducting the Cleveland Orchestra – Ravel: Daphnis et Chloé; Arturo Toscanini conducting the Philadelphia Symphony Orchestra – Schubert: Symphony No. 9 in C Major (The Great)	
1965	Erich Leinsdorf conducting the Boston Symphony Orchestra	"Mahler: Symphony No. 5 in C Sharp Minor; Berg: Wozzeck Excerpts"	Eugene Ormandy conducting the Philadelphia Orchestra – Bartók: Concerto for Orchestra; Yehudi Menuhin conducting the Bath Festival Chamber Orchestra – Handel: Concerti Grossi (12), Op. 6; Fritz Reiner conducting the Chicago Symphony Orchestra – Haydn: Symphony No. 95 in C Minor; Symphony No. 101 in D Major (Clock); Leonard Bernstein conducting the New York Philharmonic – Mahler: Symphony No. 2 in C (Resurrection); Bruno Walter conducting the Columbia Symphony Orchestra – Mozart: Last 6 Symphonies; George Szell conducting the Cleveland Orchestra – Strauss: Symphonia Domestica	
1966	Leopold Stokowski conducting the American Symphony Orchestra	"Ives: Symphony No. 4"	Herbert von Karajan conducting the Berlin Philharmonic – Bach: Brandenburg Concertos; Arturo Toscanini conducting the NBC Symphony Orchestra – Berlioz: Romeo et Juliette; Morton Gould conducting the Chicago Symphony Orchestra – Gould: Spirituals for Orchestra; Copland: Dance Symphony; Erich Leinsdorf conducting the Boston Symphony Orchestra – Prokofiev: Symphony No. 6 in E Flat Minor	
1967	Erich Leinsdorf conducting the Boston Symphony Orchestra	"Mahler: Symphony No. 6 in A Minor"	George Szell conducting the Cleveland Orchestra – Bartók: Concerto for Orchestra; Pierre Boulez, Antal Doráti conducting the BBC Symphony Orchestra – Boulez: Le Soleil des Eaux; Messiaen Chronochromie; Koechlin: Les Bandar-Log; Leonard Bernstein conducting the New York Philharmonic – Ives: Fourth of July; Gould conducting the Chicago Symphony Orchestra – Ives: Symphony No. 1 in D Minor; Eugene Ormandy conducting the Philadelphia Orchestra – Mahler: Symphony No. 10	
1968	Igor Stravinsky conducting the Columbia Symphony Orchestra	"Stravinsky: The Firebird and Petrouchka Suite"	Adrian Boult conducting the New Philharmonia Orchestra – Holst: The Planets; Morton Gould conducting the Chicago Symphony Orchestra – Ives Orchestra Set No. 2; Robert Browning Overture: Putnam's Camp; Leonard Bernstein conducting the Vienna Philharmonic – Mahler: Das Lied von der Erde; Georg Solti conducting the London Symphony Orchestra – Mahler: Symphony No. 2 in C Minor (Resurrection); Herbert von Karajan conducting the Berlin Philharmonic – Shostakovich: Symphony No. 10 in E Minor	
1969	Pierre Boulez conducting the New Philharmonic Orchestra	"Boulez Conducts Debussy (La Mer, Prélude à l'après-midi d'un faune, Jeux)"	Nikolaus Harnoncourt conducting the Concentus Musicus Wien – Bach: 4 Suites for Orchestra; Leonard Bernstein conducting the New York Philharmonic – Mahler: Symphony No. 6 in A Minor and Symphony No. 9 in D Major; Seiji Ozawa conducting the Toronto Symphony Orchestra – Messiaen: Turangalila; Takemitsu: November Steps; Erich Leinsdorf conducting the Boston Symphony Orchestra – Prokofiev: Romeo and Juliet	
1970	Pierre Boulez conducting the Cleveland Orchestra	"Boulez Conducts Debussy, Vol. 2, Images Pour Orchestra"	Pierre Boulez conducting the BBC Symphony Orchestra – Bartók: Music for Strings, Percussion and Celesta; Jean Martinon conducting the Chicago Symphony Orchestra – Ravel: Rapsodie Espagnole; Mother Goose Suite; Alborada del Gracioso; Introduction and Allegro; Zubin Mehta conducting the Los Angeles Philharmonic – Strauss: Also sprach Zarathustra; George Szell conducting the Cleveland Orchestra – Wagner: Great Orchestral Highlights from Der Ring Des Nibelungen	
1971	Pierre Boulez conducting the Cleveland Orchestra	"Stravinsky: Le Sacre Du Printemps"	Seiji Ozawa conducting the Chicago Symphony Orchestra – Bartók: Concerto for Orchestra; Carlo Maria Giulini conducting the Chicago Symphony Orchestra – Berlioz: Romeo et Juliette; George Szell conducting the Cleveland Orchestra – Bruckner: Symphony No. 8 in C Minor	
1972	Carlo Maria Giulini conducting the Chicago Symphony Orchestra	"Mahler: Symphony No. 1 in D Major"	Pierre Boulez conducting the BBC Symphony Orchestra – Boulez Conducts Boulez: Pli Selon Pli; Antal Doráti conducting the Philharmonia Hungarica – Haydn: Symphonies Nos. 65-72 (Vol. 1); Bernard Haitink conducting the London Philharmonic – Holst: The Planets; Jascha Horenstein conducting the London Symphony Orchestra – Mahler: Symphony No. 3 in D Minor	
1973	Georg Solti conducting the Chicago Symphony Orchestra	"Mahler: Symphony No. 7 in E Minor"	Pierre Boulez conducting the New York Philharmonic – Boulez Conducts Bartók: The Miraculous Mandarin and Dance Suite; Eugene Ormandy conducting the Philadelphia Orchestra – Glière: Ilya Murometz (Symphony No. 3); Antal Doráti conducting the Philharmonia Hungarica – Holst: The Planets; Leopold Stokowski conducting the London Symphony Orchestra – Ives: Orchestral Set No. 2; Herbert von Karajan conducting the Berlin Philharmonic – Schumann: Symphonies (4); Maxim Shostakovich conducting the Moscow Radio Symphony Orchestra – Shostakovich: Symphony No. 15; Michael Tilson Thomas conducting the Boston Symphony Orchestra – Stravinsky: The Rite of Spring (Le Sacre du Primtemps)	
1974	Pierre Boulez conducting the New York Philharmonic	"Bartók: Concerto for Orchestra"	Georg Solti conducting the Chicago Symphony Orchestra – Beethoven: Symphony No. 9 in D Minor; Seiji Ozawa conducting the Boston Symphony Orchestra – Berlioz: Symphonie Fantastique; Leonard Bernstein conducting the New York Philharmonic – Holst: The Planets; Lorin Maazel conducting the Cleveland Orchestra – Prokofiev: Romeo and Juliet; André Previn conducting the London Symphony Orchestra – Prokofiev: Romeo and Juliet (Complete)	
1975	Georg Solti conducting the Chicago Symphony Orchestra	"Berlioz: Symphonie Fantastique"	Herbert von Karajan conducting the Berlin Philharmonic – Bartók: Concerto for Orchestra; Leonard Bernstein conducting the New York Philharmonic – Bernstein Conducts Ravel; André Previn conducting the London Symphony Orchestra – Holst: The Planets; José Serebrier conducting the London Philharmonic – Ives: Symphony No. 4; Leonard Bernstein conducting the London Symphony Orchestra – Mahler: Symphony No. 2 in C Minor	
1976	Pierre Boulez conducting the New York Philharmonic	"Ravel: Daphnis et Chloé"	Colin Davis conducting the Concertgebouw Orchestra – Berlioz: Symphonie Fantastique; James Levine conducting the Chicago Symphony Orchestra – Mahler: Symphony No. 4 in G Major; Rafael Kubelik conducting the Boston Symphony Orchestra – Bartók: Concerto for Orchestra; Sir Georg Solti conducting the Chicago Symphony Orchestra – Beethoven: Symphonies (9) Complete; Carlos Kleiber conducting the Vienna Philharmonic – Beethoven: Symphony No. 5 in C Minor	
1977	Raymond Minshull (producer), Sir Georg Solti conducting the Chicago Symphony Orchestra	"Strauss: Also Sprach Zarathustra"	Jean Martinon conducting the ORTF National Orchestra – Berlioz: Symphonie Fantastique; James Levine conducting the Chicago Symphony Orchestra – Brahms: Symphony No. 1 in C Minor; Sir Georg Solti conducting the London Philharmonic – Elgar: Symphony No. 2 in E Flat Major; Pierre Boulez conducting the New York Philharmonic – Falla: The Three-Cornered Hat (Boulez Conducts Falla); Michael Tilson Thomas conducting the Columbia Jazz Band – Gershwin: Rhapsody in Blue; Jean Martinon conducting the Orchestre de Paris – Ravel: Daphnis et Chloé (Complete); Zubin Mehta conducting the Los Angeles Philharmonic – The Fourth of July! (Ives: Symphony No. 2, Variations on America/Copland: Appalachian Spring/Bernstein: Overture to Candidate/Gershwin: American in Paris)	
1978	Gunther Breest (producer), Carlo Maria Giulini conducting the Chicago Symphony Orchestra	"Mahler: Symphony No. 9 in D Major"	Pierre Boulez conducting the New York Philharmonic – Bartók: The Wooden Prince; Herbert von Karajan conducting the Berlin Philharmonic – Bruckner: Symphony No. 8 in C Minor; James Levine conducting the Chicago Symphony Orchestra – Mahler: Symphony No. 3 in D Minor; Georg Solti conducting the Chicago Symphony Orchestra – Ravel: Bolero; André Previn conducting the London Symphony Orchestra – Tchaikovsky: Swan Lake	
1979	Michel Glotz (producer), Herbert von Karajan conducting the Berlin Philharmonic	"Beethoven: Symphonies (9) (Complete)"	Zubin Mehta conducting the New York Philharmonic – Stravinsky: The Rite of Spring; André Previn conducting the Chicago Symphony Orchestra – Shostakovich: Symphony No. 5; Leonard Slatkin conducting the St. Louis Symphony Orchestra – Rachmaninoff: Symphony No. 1 in D Minor; André Previn conducting the London Symphony Orchestra – Messiaen: Turangalila Symphony; Kurt Masur conducting the Leipzig Gewandhaus Orchestra – Mendelssohn: Symphonies (5) (Complete); Claudio Abbado conducting the Vienna Philharmonic – Mahler: Symphony No. 9 in D Major; Neville Marriner conducting the Concertgebouw Orchestra – Holst: The Planets; Carlo Maria Giulini conducting the Chicago Symphony Orchestra – Bruckner: Symphony No. 9 in D Minor; Pierre Boulez conducting the New York Philharmonic – Varèse: Ameriques; Arcana; Ionisation (Boulez Conducts Varese)	
1980	James Mallinson (producer), Georg Solti conducting the Chicago Symphony Orchestra	"Brahms: Symphonies (4) (Complete)"	Andreas Holschneider (producer), Alexander Van Wijnkoop conducting the Camerata Bern – Zelenka: Orchestral Works (Complete); André Previn conducting the Pittsburgh Symphony Orchestra – Mahler: Symphony No. 4 in G Major; Dennis Russell Davies conducting the St. Paul Chamber Orchestra – Ives: Three Places in New England; Eugene Ormandy conducting the Philadelphia Orchestra – Sibelius: Four Legens from the Kalevala; Georg Solti conducting the London Philharmonic – Holst: The Planets; Leonard Slatkin conducting the St. Louis Symphony – Rachmaninoff: Symphonies No. 2 in E Minor and No. 3 in A Minor	
1981	Raymond Minshull (producer), Georg Solti conducting the Chicago Symphony Orchestra	"Bruckner: Symphony No. 6 in A Major"	Leonard Bernstein conducting the New York Philharmonic – Shostakovich: Symphony No. 5; Leonard Bernstein conducting the Vienna Philharmonic – Beethoven: Symphonies (9); Michael Tilson Thomas conducting the Buffalo Philharmonic – Ruggles: Complete Music; Michael Tilson Thomas conducting the Los Angeles Philharmonic – Respighi: Feste Romane; Fountains of Rome	
1982	James Mallinson (producer), Georg Solti conducting the Chicago Symphony Orchestra	"Mahler: Symphony No. 2 in C Minor"	André Previn conducting the London Symphony Orchestra – Gershwin: Porgy and Bess (Symphonic Picture); Cuban Overture and Second Rhapsody; Christopher Hogwood & Jaap Schröder conducting the Academy of Ancient Music – Mozart: The Symphonies: Salzburg 1775–1983, Vol. 5; James Levine conducting the Philadelphia Orchestra – Mahler: Symphony No. 10 (Deryck Cooke final version); Simon Rattle conducting the Philharmonia Orchestra – Holst: The Planets	
1983	Jay David Saks, Thomas Z. Shepard (producers), James Levine conducting the Chicago Symphony Orchestra	"Mahler: Symphony No. 7 in E Minor (Song of the Night)"	Christopher Hogwood conducting the Academy of Ancient Music – Mozart: Symphonies, Vol. 1 (The Early Works); Eduardo Mata conducting the Dallas Symphony Orchestra – Strauss: Death and Transfiguration; Don Juan; Salome, Dance of the Seven Veils; Herbert von Karajan conducting the Berlin Philharmonic – Holst: The Planets; Leonard Slatkin conducting the Chicago Symphony Orchestra – Debussy: La Mer; Prelude a l'Après-Midi d'un Faune; Danses Sacrée et Profane	
1984	James Mallinson (producer), Georg Solti conducting the Chicago Symphony Orchestra	"Mahler: Symphony No. 9 in D Major"	Leonard Slatkin conducting the St. Louis Symphony Orchestra – Del Tredici: In Memory of a Summer Day (Child Alice, Part One); Carlo Maria Giulini conducting the Los Angeles Philharmonic – Beethoven: Symphony No. 5 in C Minor, Op. 67; Christopher Hogwood conducting the Academy of Ancient Music – Mozart: The Symphonies, Vol. 6; Leonard Bernstein conducting the Los Angeles Philharmonic – Bernstein: West Side Story Symphonic Dances with Candide Overture; Barber: Adagio for Strings; Schumann: American Festival Overture (Album)	
1985	Jay David Saks (producer), Leonard Slatkin conducting the St. Louis Symphony Orchestra	"Prokofiev: Symphony No. 5 in B Flat, Op. 100"	Claudio Abbado conducting the Chicago Symphony Orchestra – Berlioz: Symphonie Fantastique, Op. 14; Georg Solti conducting the Chicago Symphony Orchestra – Mahler: Symphony No. 4 in G Major; James Levine conducting the Chicago Symphony Orchestra – Schubert: Symphony No. 9 in C Major (The Great); Morton Gould conducting the American Symphony Orchestra – Gould: Burchfield Gallery and Apple Waltzes; Neville Marriner conducting the Academy of St. Martin-in-the-Fields – Amadeus	
1986	Robert Woods (producer), Robert Shaw conducting the Atlanta Symphony Orchestra	"Fauré: Pelléas et Mélisande"	James Conlon conducting the Rotterdam Philharmonic Orchestra – Liszt: A Faust Symphony; James Levine conducting the Chicago Symphony Orchestra – Dvořák: Symphony No. 7 in D Minor; Leonard Slatkin conducting the St. Louis Symphony Orchestra – Prokofiev: Cinderella (Suite); Louis Lane conducting the Atlanta Symphony Orchestra – Respighi: Pines of Rome; The Birds; Fountains of Rome	
1987	Michael Haas (producer), Georg Solti conducting the Chicago Symphony Orchestra	"Liszt: A Faust Symphony"	Bernard Haitink conducting the London Philharmonic Orchestra – Vaughan Williams: Sinfonia Antarctica; Leonard Slatkin conducting the St. Louis Symphony Orchestra – Copland: Billy the Kid and Rodeo (Complete Ballets); Riccardo Muti conducting the Philadelphia Orchestra – Respighi: Pines of Rome; Fountains of Rome; Roman Festival; Robert Shaw conducting the Atlanta Symphony Orchestra and Chorus – Beethoven: Symphony No. 9 in D Minor (Choral)	
1988	Michael Haas (producer), Georg Solti conducting the Chicago Symphony Orchestra	"Beethoven: Symphony No. 9 in D Minor (Choral)"	Charles Dutoit conducting the Montreal Symphony Orchestra – Holst: The Planets; James Levine conducting the Berlin Philharmonic – Berg, Webern, Schoenberg: Orchestral Pieces; Leonard Bernstein conducting the New York Philharmonic – Copland: Symphony No. 3; Quiet City; Leonard Slatkin conducting the St. Louis Symphony Orchestra – Hanson: Symphony No. 2 (Romantic)	
1989	Robert Woods (producer), Robert Shaw & Louis Lane conducting the Atlanta Symphony Orchestra	"Rorem: String Symphony; Sunday Morning; Eagles"	Georg Solti conducting the Chicago Symphony Orchestra – Bruckner: Symphony No. 7 in E; Leonard Bernstein conducting the New York Philharmonic – Mahler: Symphony No. 2 in C Minor (Resurrection); Leonard Slatkin conducting the St. Louis Symphony Orchestra – Copland: Appalachian Spring (Complete); Letter from Home; John Henry; Cortege Macabre from Grohg; Roger Norrington conducting the London Classical Players – Beethoven: Symphony No. 9 in D Minor	
1990	Leonard Bernstein conducting the New York Philharmonic	"Mahler: Symphony No. 3 in D Minor"	Charles Dutoit conducting the Montreal Symphony Orchestra – Bartók: Music for Strings, Percussion and Celesta; Herbert von Karajan conducting the Vienna Philharmonic Orchestra – Bruckner: Symphony No. 8 in C Minor; Orpheus Chamber Orchestra – Copland: Appalachian Spring; Short Symphony; 3 Latin American Sketches; Quiet City; Gerard Schwarz conducting the Seattle Symphony Orchestra – Hanson: Symphony Nos. 1 in E Minor 'Nordic' and 2 'Romantic', Elegy in Memory of Serge Koussevitsky	
1991	Leonard Bernstein conducting the Chicago Symphony Orchestra	"Shostakovich: Symphonies No. 1 & 7"	Sir Georg Solti conducting the Chicago Symphony Orchestra – Beethoven: Symphonies Nos. 7 in A & 8 in F; Gerard Schwarz conducting the Seattle Symphony Orchestra – Hanson: Symphonies Nos. 3 & 6; Leonard Bernstein conducting the New York Philharmonic – Ives: Symphony No. 2; The Gong On the Hook and Ladder; Central Park In the Dark; The Unanswered Question; Leonard Slatkin conducting the St. Louis Symphony Orchestra – Shostakovich: Symphony No. 8, Op. 65	
1992	Daniel Barenboim conducting the Chicago Symphony Orchestra	"Corigliano: Symphony No. 1"	Leonard Slatkin conducting the St. Louis Symphony – Copland: Symphony No. 3; Music for a Great City; James Levine conducting the Chicago Symphony Orchestra – Holst: The Planets; Michael Tilson Thomas conducting the Chicago Symphony Orchestra – Ives: Symphonies Nos. 1 & 4; Rafael Kubelik conducting the Czech Philharmonic – Smetana: Ma Vlast	
1993	Leonard Bernstein conducting the Berlin Philharmonic	"Mahler: Symphony No. 9"	Nicholas Harnoncourt conducting the Chamber Orchestra of Europe – Beethoven: Symphonies (Complete); David Zinman conducting the London Sinfonietta – Górecki: Symphony No. 3; Myung-Whun Chung conducting the Orchestre de l'Opera Bastille – Messiaen: Turangalila Symphonie; Leonard Slatkin conducting the St. Louis Symphony Orchestra – Schumann: Symphony No. 10; New England Triptych; American Festival Overture	
1994	Pierre Boulez conducting the Chicago Symphony Orchestra	"Bartók: The Wooden Prince"	David Zinman conducting the Baltimore Symphony Orchestra – Barber: Adagio, Symphony No. 1, The School for Scandal, Essays; Pierre Boulez conducting the Cleveland Orchestra – Debussy: Images, Printemps, Prélude à l'Après-midi D'un Faune; Ingo Metzmacher conducting the Ensemble Modern – Ives: A Portrait of Charles Ives; Leonard Slatkin conducting the St. Louis Symphony Orchestra – Ives: Symphony No. 3; Three Places In New England; The Unanswered Question; Central Park In the Dark	
1995	Pierre Boulez conducting the Chicago Symphony Orchestra	"Bartók: Concerto for Orchestra; Four Orchestral Pieces, Op. 12"	John Eliot Gardiner conducting the Orchestra Revolutionnaire et Romantique – Beethoven: Nine Symphonies; Oliver Knussen conducting the Cleveland Orchestra, London Sinfonietta – Copland: Grohg; Hear Ye! Hear Ye!; Prelude; Orpheus Chamber Orchestra – Ives: A Set of Pieces (Three Places in New England, Symphony No. 3, etc.); Myung-Whun Chung conducting the Orchestre de l'Opera Bastille – Messiaen: Eclairs Sur L'Au-Dela...	
1996	Pierre Boulez conducting the Cleveland Orchestra	"Debussy: La Mer"	Pierre Boulez conducting the Chicago Symphony Orchestra – Bartók: Divertimento, Dance Suite, Etc.; Simon Rattle conducting the City of Birmingham Symphony Orchestra – Elgar: Enigma Variations, Falstaff, Grania and Diarmid; Wolfgang Sawallisch conducting the Philadelphia Orchestra – Hindemith: Mathis Der Maler Symphony; André Previn conducting the London Symphony Orchestra – Shostakovich: Symphony No. 8	
1997	Michael Tilson Thomas conducting the San Francisco Symphony	"Prokofiev: Romeo and Juliet (Scenes from the Ballet)"	Pierre Boulez conducting the Chicago Symphony Orchestra and Chorus – Bartók: The Miraculous Mandarin; Music for Strings, Percussion and Celesta; Esa-Pekka Salonen conducting the Los Angeles Philharmonic – Lutosławski: Symphony No. 2; Pierre Boulez conducting the Cleveland Orchestra – Messiaen: Et Exspecto Resurrectionem Mortuorum; Chronochromie, Etc.; Yuri Temirkanov conducting the St. Petersburg Philharmonic Orchestra – Shostakovich: Symphony No. 7 'Leningrad'	
1998	Pierre Boulez conducting the Cleveland Orchestra and Chorus	"Berlioz: Symphonie Fantastique; Tristia"	Sir Charles Mackerras conducting the Scottish Chamber Orchestra and Chorus – Brahms: The Four SYmphonies; Academic Festival Overture, Etc.; Franz Welser-Möst conducting the Philadelphia Orchestra – Korngold: Symphony In F Sharp, Op. 40; Christopher Lyndon-Gee conducting the Arnhem Philadelphia Orchestra – Markevitch: Complete Orchestral Music, Vol. 1 (Le Nouvel Age; Sinfonietta In F; Cinema Ouverture); Riccardo Chailly conducting the Philadelphia Orchestra – Shostakovich: The Dance Album (Moscow-Chermoushki; The BOlt, Etc.)	
1999	Pierre Boulez conducting the Chicago Symphony Orchestra	"Mahler: Symphony No. 9"	Nikolaus Harnoncourt conducting the Berliner Philharmonic and Chorus – Brahms: The Symphonies (Nos. 1-4; Haydn Variations; Tragic Overture, Etc.; Oliver Knussen conducting the London Sinfonietta – Henze: Undine; Yoel Levi conducting the Women of the Atlanta Symphony Chorus, Atlanta Symphony Orchestra – Holst: The Planets; Christoph von Dohnányi conducting the Cleveland Orchestra – Ives: Three Places In New England; Orchestral Set No. 2/Ruggles Sun-Treader Men and Mountains; Riccardo Chailly conducting the Royal Concertgebouw Orchestra – Varese: The Complete Works	
2000	Michael Tilson Thomas conducting the Peninsula Boys Choir, San Francisco Girl's Chorus, San Francisco Symphony Orchestra & Chorus	"Stravinsky: The Firebird, The Rite of Spring, Persésophone"	Pierre Boulez conducting the Chicago Symphony Orchestra – Mahler: Symphony No. 1; Simon Rattle conducting the City of Birmingham Symphony Youth Chorus, Ladies of the City of Birmingham Symphony Chorus, City of Birmingham Symphony Orchestra – Mahler: Symphony No. 3; 8 Lieder from "Des Knaben Wunderhorn"; Benjamin Zander conducting the Philharmonia Orchestra – Mahler: Symphony No. 9; Esa-Pekka Salonen conducting the Los Angeles Philharmonic, Los Angeles Philharmonic New Music Group – Revueltas: Sensemayá (Sensemayá; Ocho Por Radio; First Little Serious Piece, Etc.)	
2001	Simon Rattle conducting the Berliner Philharmonic	"Mahler: Symphony No. 10"	Daniel Barenboim conducting the Berliner Staatskapelle – Beethoven: The Symphonies; Charles Mackerras conducting the Scottish Chamber Orchestra – Mahler: Symphony No. 10; Mikko Franck conducting the Swedish Radio Symphony Orchestra – Sibelius: En Saga, Op. 9; Lemminkäinen Legends, Op. 22; Valery Gergiev conducting the Kirov Orchestra – Tchaikovsky: Symphony No. 6 :Pathétique; Romeo and Juliet, Etc.	
2002	Pierre Boulez conducting the Chicago Symphony Orchestra	"Boulez Conducts Varèse (Amériques; Arcana; Deserts; Ionisation)"	Claudio Abbado conducting the Eric Ericson Chamber Orchestra, Swedish Radio Chorus, Berliner Philharmonic – Beethoven: Die Symphonien; Osmo Vänskä conducting the BBC Scottish Symphony Orchestra – Bruckner: Symphony No. 3 in D Minor; Kent Nagano conducting the Berliner Philharmonic – Messiaen: Turangalila-Symphonie (1990 Version); José Serebrier conducting the Bournemouth Symphony Orchestra – Schumann: Violin Concerto; New England Triptych/Ives: Variations On "America"	
2003	Michael Tilson Thomas conducting the San Francisco Symphony	"Mahler: Symphony No. 6"	Nikolaus Harnoncourt conducting the Chamber Orchestra of Europe – Dvořák: Slavonic Dances; Daniel Barenboim conducting the Chicago Symphony Orchestra – Furtwängler: Symphony No. 2; Mstislav Rostropovich conducting the London Symphony Orchestra – Shostakovich: Symphony No. 11; Jesús López-Cobos conducting the Cincinnati Symphony Orchestra – Turina: Danzas Fantàsticas; Sonfonia Sevillana, Etc./Debussy: Iberia	
2004	Pierre Boulez conducting the Vienna Boys' Choir, Women's Chorus of the Vienna Singverein, Vienna Philharmonic, Various Artists	"Mahler: Symphony No. 3"	Roger Norrington conducting the Radio-Sonfonieorchestre, Stuttgart des SWR – Beethoven: Symphonies 1-9; José Serebrier conducting the Bournemouth Symphony Orchestra – Rorem: Three Symphonies; Wolfgang Sawallisch conducting the Philadelphia Orchestra, Various Artists – Schumann: Symphonies 1-4; Manfred Overture, Etc.; José Serebrier conducting the Toulouse National Chamber Orchestra, Various Artists – Serebrier: Symphony No. 3; Passacaglia and Perpetuum Mobile, Etc.	
2005	Lorin Maazel conducting the New York Philharmonic, Brooklyn Youth Chorus, New York Choral Artists	"Adams: On the Transmigration of Souls"	David Lloyd-Jones conducting the Royal Scottish National Orchestra – Bax: Symphony No. 7; Tintagel (Tone Poem); José Serebrier conducting the Royal Scottish National Orchestra – Glazunov: Symphony No. 5; The Seasons, Op. 67 (Complete Ballet); Robert Spano conducting the Atlanta Symphony Orchestra – Higdon: City Space; Concerto for Orchestra; Jirí Belohlávek conducting the Czech Philharmonic Orchestra – Martinů: Symphonies Nos. 3 & 4	
2006	Mariss Jansons conducting the Chor des Bayerischen Rundfunks, Symphonieorchester des Bayerischen Rundfunks	"Shostakovich: Symphony No. 13"	Hugh Wolff conducting the Radio-Sinfonie-Orchester Frankfurt – Antheil: Symphony No. 3 "American"; Yakov Kreizberg conducting the Wiener Symphoniker – Bruckner: Symphony No. 7; José Serebrier conducting the Bournemouth Symphony Orchestra – Mussorgsky/Stokowski: Pictures at an Exhibition; Leon Botstein conducting the London Symphony Orchestra – Popov: Symphony No. 1; Shostakovich: Theme & Variations	
2007	Michael Tilson Thomas conducting the San Francisco Symphony	"Mahler: Symphony No. 7"	Vernon Handley conducting the BBC Philharmonic – Bax: Tone Poems; José Serebrier conducting the Royal Scottish National Orchestra – Glazunov: Symphonies 4 & 7; Iván Fischer conducting the Budapest Festival Orchestra – Mahler: Symphony No. 6 in A Minor; Valery Gergiev conducting the London Symphony Orchestra – Prokofiev: The Complete Symphonies	
2008	Leonard Slatkin conducting the Nashville Symphony	"Tower: Made In America"	Osmo Vänskä conducting the Minnesota Orchestra – Beethoven: Symphony No. 9; José Serebrier conducting the Royal Scottish National Orchestra – Shostakovich: The Golden Age; Esa-Pekka Salonen conducting the Los Angeles Philharmonic – Stravinsky: Le Sacre Du Primtemps; Robert Spano conducting the Atlanta Symphony Orchestra – Vaughan Williams: Symphony No. 5, Fantasia On a Theme by Thomas Tallis, Serenade to Music	
2009	Bernard Haitink conducting the Chicago Symphony Orchestra	"Shostakovich: Symphony No. 4"	Rumon Gamba conducting the Iceland Symphony Orchestra – D'Indy: Orchestral Works, Vol. 1; José Serebrier conducting the Royal Scottish National Orchestra – Glazunov: Symphony No. 6, La Mer, Introduction and Dance from Salome; Alan Gilbert conducting the Chicago Symphony Orchestra – Prokofiev: Scythian Suite, Op. 20; Chris Walden conducting the Hollywood Studio Symphony Orchestra – Walden, Chris: Symphony No. 1, The Four Elements	
2010	James Levine conducting the Boston Symphony Orchestra, Tanglewood Festival Chorus	"Ravel: Daphnis et Chloé"	Simon Rattle conducting the Berliner Philharmoniker – Berlioz: Symphonie Fantastique; Benjamin Zander conducting the Philharmonia Orchestra – Bruckner: Symphony No. 5; Valery Gergiev conducting the Orchestra of the Mariinsky Theater – Shostakovich: Symphonies Nos. 1 & 15; Antoni Wit conducting the Warsaw Philharmonic Orchestra – Szymanowski: Symphonies Nos. 1 & 4	
2011	Giancarlo Guerrero conducting the Nashville Symphony	"Daugherty: Metropolis Symphony; Deux Ex Machina"	Mariss Jansons conducting the Royal Concertgebouw Orchestra – Bruckner: Symphonies Nos. 3 & 4; Gil Rose conducting the Catch Electric Guitar Quartet; Boston Modern Orchestra Project; Synergy Vocals – Mackey, Steven: Dreamhouse; Thomas Fey conducting the Mannheimer Mozartorchester – Salieri: Overtures & Stage Music; Pierre Boulez conducting the Chicago Symphony Orchestra – Stravinsky: Pulcinella; Symphony In Three Movements; Four Études	
2012	Gustavo Dudamel conducting the Los Angeles Philharmonic	"Brahms: Symphony No. 4"	Andrew Davis conducting the BBC Philharmonic – Bowen: Symphonies 1 & 2; Nicholas McGegan conducting the Philharmonia Baroque Orchestra – Haydn: Symphonies 104, 88 & 101; Marek Janowski conducting the Rundfunk Sinfonieorchester Berlin – Henze: Symphonies Nos. 3-5; Jirí Belohlávek conducting the BBC Symphony Orchestra – Martinů: The Six Symphonies	
2013	Michael Tilson Thomas conducting the San Francisco Symphony	"Adams: Harmonielehre & Short Ride in a Fast Machine"	Ivan Fischer conducting the Budapest Festival Orchestra – Mahler: Symphony No. 1; Carlos Kalmar conducting the Oregon Symphony – Music for a Time of War; Valery Gergiev conducting the London Symphony Orchestra – Rachmaninoff: Symphonic Dances; Osmo Vänskä conducting the Minnesota Orchestra – Sibelius: Symphonies Nos. 2 & 5	
2014	Osmo Vänskä conducting the Minnesota Orchestra	"Sibelius: Symphonies Nos. 1 & 4"	Neeme Järvi conducting the Gothenburg Symphony Orchestra – Atterberg: Orchestral Works Vol. 1; Esa-Pekka Salonen conducting the Los Angeles Philharmonic – Lutosławski: Symphony No. 1; Claudio Abbado conducting the Orchestra Mozart – Schumann: Symphony No. 2; Overtures Mangred & Genoveva; Simon Rattle conducting the Berliner Philharmoniker – Stravinsky: Le Sacre du Printemps	
2015	David Robertson conducting the St. Louis Symphony	"Adams: City Noir"	Ludovic Morlot conducting the Seattle Symphony – Dutilleux: SYmphony No. 1; Tout un Monde Lointain; The Shadows of Time; Manfred Honeck conducting the Pittsburgh Symphony Orchestra – Dvořák: Symphony No. 8/Janácek: Symphonic Suite from Jenufa; Simon Rattle conducting the Berliner Philharmoniker – Schumann: Symphonien 1-4; Robert Spano conducting the Atlanta Symphony Orchestra – Sibelius: Symphonies Nos. 6 & 7; Tapiola	
2016	Andris Nelsons conducting the Boston Symphony Orchestra	"Shostakovich: Under Stalin's Shadow - Symphony No. 10"	Manfred Honeck conducting the Pittsburgh Symphony Orchestra – Bruckner: Symphony No. 4; Ludovic Morlot conducting the Seattle Symphony – Dutilleux: Métaboles; L'Arbre des Songes; Symphony No. 2, 'Le Double'; Carlos Kalmar conducting the Oregon Symphony – Spirit of the American Range; Darrell Ang conducting the New Zealand Symphony Orchestra – Zhou Long & Chen Yi: Symphony Humen 1839	
2017	Andris Nelsons conducting the Boston Symphony Orchestra	"Shostakovich: Under Stalin's Shadow - Symphony Nos. 5, 8 & 9"	Michael Tilson Thomas conducting the San Francisco Symphony Orchestra – Bates: Works for Orchestra; Neeme Järvi conducting the Orchestre de la Suisse Romande – Ibert: Orchestral Works; Mariss Jansons conducting the Royal Concertgebouw Orchestra – Prokofiev: Symphony No. 5 in B-Flat Major, Op. 100; Alan Gilbert conducting the New York Philharmonic – Rouse: Odna Zhizn; Symphonies 3 & 4; Prospero's Rooms	
2018	Manfred Honeck conducting the Pittsburgh Symphony Orchestra	"Shostakovich: Symphony No. 5; Barber: Adagio"	Louis Langrée conducting the Cincinnati Symphony Orchestra – Concertos for Orchestra; Leonard Slatkin conducting the Detroit Symphony Orchestra – Copland: Symphony No. 3; Three Latin American Sketches; Michael Tilson Thomas conducting the San Francisco Symphony – Debussy: Images; Jeux & La Plus Que Lente; Osmo Vänskä conducting the Minnesota Orchestra – Mahler: Symphony No. 5	
2019	Andris Nelsons conducting the Boston Symphony Orchestra	"Shostakovich: Symphonies No. 4 & 11"	Manfred Honeck conducting the Pittsburgh Symphony Orchestra – Beethoven: Symphony No. 3/Strauss: Horn Concerto No. 1; Thomas Dausgaard conducting the Seattle Symphony – Nielsen: Symphony No. 3 & Symphony No. 4; David Alan Miller conducting the National Orchestral Institute Philharmonic – Ruggles, Stucky & Harbison: Orchestral Works; Michael Tilson Thomas conducting the San Francisco Symphony – Schumann: Symphonies Nos. 1-4	
2020	Gustavo Dudamel conducting the Los Angeles Philharmonic	"Norman: Sustain"	Manfred Honeck conducting the Pittsburgh Symphony Orchestra – Bruckner: Symphony No. 9; Leonard Slatkin conducting the Detroit Symphony Orchestra – Copland: Billy the Kid; Grohg; Louis Langrée conducting the Cincinnati Symphony Orchestra – Transatlantic; Mirga Gražinytė-Tyla conducting the City of Birmingham Symphony Orchestra & Kremerata Baltica – Wienberg: Symphonies Nos. 2 & 21	
2021	Gustavo Dudamel conducting the Los Angeles Philharmonic	"Ives: Complete Symphonies"	Carlos Kalmar conducting the Oregon Symphony – Aspects of America: Pulitzer Edition; Daniel Bjarnason conducting the Iceland Symphony Orchestra – Concurrence; Michael Tilson Thomas conducting the San Francisco Symphony – Copland: Symphony No. 3; Hannu Lintu conducting the Finnish Radio Symphony Orchestra – Lutosławski: Symphonies Nos. 2 & 3	
2022	Yannick Nézet-Séguin conducting the Philadelphia Orchestra	"Price: Symphonies Nos. 1 & 3"	Giancarlo Guerrero conducting the Nashville Symphony Orchestra – Adams: My Father Knew Charles Ives; Harmonielehre; Manfred Honeck conducting the Mendelssohn Choir Of Pittsburgh & Pittsburgh Symphony Orchestra – Beethoven: Symphony No. 9; Nico Muhly conducting the San Francisco Symphony – Muhly: Throughline; Thomas Dausgaard conducting the Seattle Symphony Orchestra – Strauss: Also Sprach Zarathustra; Scriabin; The Poem of Ecstasy	
2023	Michael Repper conducting the New York Youth Symphony	"Works by Florence Price, Jessie Montgomery & Valerie Coleman"	Doug Perkins (cd); Musicians Of The University Of Michigan Department Of Chamber Music; University Of Michigan Percussion Ensemble; The Crossing; JACK Quartet (ensembles) - Adams, John Luther: Sila - The Breath of the World; Gustavo Dudamel (cd); Los Angeles Philharmonic (orchestra) - Dvorák: Symphonies Nos. 7-9; Christopher Rountree (cd); Wild Up (ensemble) - Eastman: Stay On It; John Williams (cd); Berlin Philharmoniker (orchestra) -The Berlin Concert	
2024	Gustavo Dudamel (conductor); Los Angeles Philharmonic	Adès: Dante	Karina Canellakis (cd); Netherlands Radio Philharmonic Orchestra - Bartók: Concerto for Orchestra; Four Pieces; Yannick Néget-Séguin (cd); The Philadelphia Orchestra - Price: Symphony No. 4; Dawson: Negro Folk Symphony; JoAnn Falletta (cd); The Buffalo Philharmonic Orchestra - Scriabin: Symphony No. 2; The Poem of Ecstasy; Esa-Pekka Salonen (cd); San Francisco Symphony - Stravinsky: The Rite of Spring	
2025	Gustavo Dudamel (conductor); Los Angeles Philharmonic	Ortiz: Revolución Diamantina	Marin Alsop (cd); ORF Vienna Radio Symphony Orchestra - Adams: City Noir, Fearful Symmetries & Lola Montez Does the Spider Dance; JoAnn Falletta (cd); Buffalo Philharmonic Orchestra - Kodály: Háry János Suite; Summer Evening & Symphony in C Major; Susanna Mälkki (cd); Helsinki Philharmonic Orchestra - Sibelius: Karelia Suite; Rakastava & Lemminkäinen; Esa-Pekka Salonen (cd); San Francisco Symphony - Stravinsky: The Firebird	
2026	Andris Nelsons (conductor); Boston Symphony Orchestra	Messiaen: Turangalîla-Symphonie	Michael Repper (cd); The National Philharmonic - Coleridge-Taylor: Toussaint l'Ouverture; Ballade op. 4; Suites From '24 Negro Melodies'; Gustavo Dudamel (cd); Simón Bolívar Symphony Orchestra of Venezuela - Ravel: Boléro; M. 81; Yannick Nézét-Seguin (cd); The Philadelphia Orchestra - Still & Bonds; Esa-Pekka Salonen (cd); San Francisco Symphony - Stravinsky: Symphony In Three Movements	
2027	Winner TBA on 7 February 2027		Barbara Hannigan (cd); Gothenburg Symphony Orchestra - An American Dream?; Marin Alsop (cd); Baltimore Symphony Orchestra - Clyne: Color Field; David Alan Miller (cd); Albany Symphony - Cuong: Orbital; John Williams (cd); United States Marine Band - The President's Own Vol. 3; Gustavo Dudamel (cd); Los Angeles Philharmonic - Pájaros Mágicos	

== Multiple wins and nominations ==
The following individuals received two or more Best Orchestral Performance awards:

Wins	Conductor	Nominations
12	Pierre Boulez	25
9	Georg Solti	18
5	Michael Tilson Thomas	14
5	Gustavo Dudamel	6
3	Leonard Bernstein	20
3	Carlo Maria Giulini	5
3	Erich Leinsdorf	5
3	Andris Nelsons	3
2	James Levine	10
2	Charles Münch	3
2	Robert Shaw	3
2	Leonard Slatkin	14
2	Igor Stravinsky	2

The following individuals received four or more Best Orchestral Performance nominations:

Nominations	Conductor
25	Pierre Boulez
20	Leonard Bernstein
18	Georg Solti
14	Leonard Slatkin
14	Michael Tilson Thomas
10	James Levine
9	Herbert von Karajan
9	José Serebrier
8	André Previn
7	Simon Rattle
6	Morton Gould
6	Manfred Honeck
6	Fritz Reiner
6	George Szell
5
5	Gustavo Dudamel
5	Carlo Maria Giulini
5	Erich Leinsdorf
5	Osmo Vänskä
5	Bruno Walter
4	Claudio Abbado
4	Valery Gergiev
4	Nikolaus Harnoncourt
4	Eugene Ormandy
4	Esa-Pekka Salonen
