= Freuet euch des Lebens =

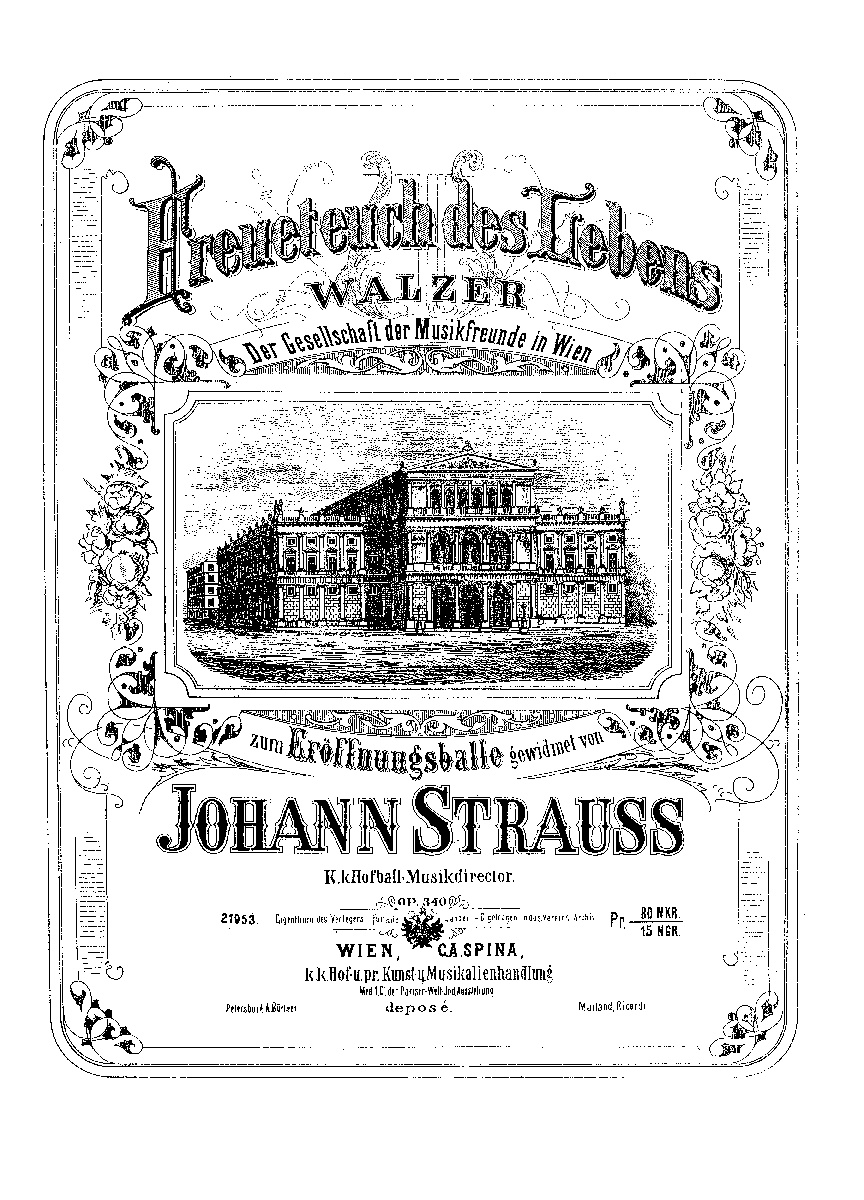
Cover of the piano score

Freuet euch des Lebens (Enjoy Life), Op. 340, is a Viennese waltz composed by Johann Strauss II. It was written for the Vienna Musikverein, and premiered at the new Musikverein building in Vienna in 1870.

Waltz 1

== Influence ==
In the opening movement of his Ninth Symphony, Gustav Mahler quotes from this waltz.

== Vienna New Year's Concert ==
The waltz was played at these Vienna New Year's Concerts:

- 1947 – Josef Krips
- 1962 – Willi Boskovsky
- 1974 – Willi Boskovsky
- 1988 – Claudio Abbado
- 1997 – Riccardo Muti
- 2008 – Georges Prêtre
- 2012 – Mariss Jansons
- 2020 – Andris Nelsons
