= Manfred Honeck =

Austrian conductor (born 1958)

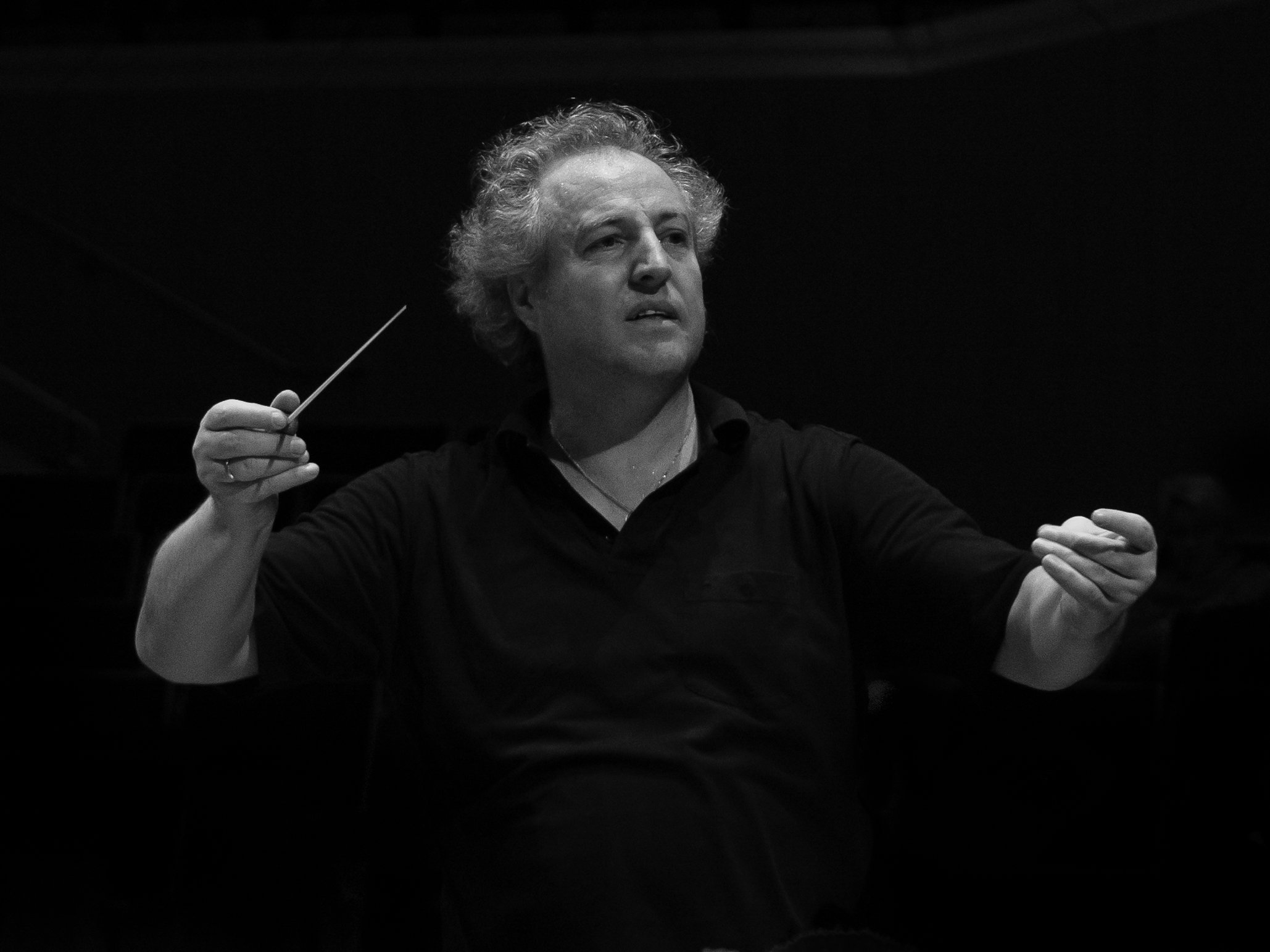
- Honeck in 2013
- Born: 17 September 1958 (age 68); Nenzing, Vorarlberg, Austria
- Education: University of Music and Performing Arts Vienna
- Years active: 1980s–present
- Employer: Pittsburgh Symphony Orchestra
- Organization: Vienna Jeunesse Orchestra
- Style: Classical
- Relatives: Rainer Honeck (brother)

Manfred Honeck (born 17 September 1958) is an Austrian conductor. He is currently music director of the Pittsburgh Symphony Orchestra.

== Early life ==
Honeck was born in Nenzing, Austria, near the border of Switzerland and Liechtenstein, one of nine children of Otto and Frieda Honeck. One of his brothers is the Vienna Philharmonic concertmaster Rainer Honeck (born 1961). Beginning as a violinist, Honeck received his musical training at the University of Music and Performing Arts Vienna and later played the viola. He subsequently played in the Vienna Philharmonic and Vienna State Opera orchestra. His early work as a conductor included a period as assistant to Claudio Abbado with the Gustav Mahler Jugendorchester (youth orchestra). In 1987, Honeck founded the Vienna Jeunesse Orchestra.

== Career ==
=== 1991–1999 ===
Following his work with the Mahler Jugendorchester, Honeck conducted regularly at the Zurich Opera House, from 1991 to 1996. In 1993, while conducting at the Zurich Opera House, he was awarded the European Conductor's Award. From 1997 to 1998, he was music director of the Norwegian National Opera in Oslo and held a regular position, from 1996 to 1999, with the MDR Leipzig Radio Symphony Orchestra. In 1998, he was named the principal guest conductor of the Oslo Philharmonic.

=== 2000–2006 ===
From 2000 to 2006, Honeck was music director of the Swedish Radio Symphony Orchestra. He was principal guest conductor of the Czech Philharmonic Orchestra from 2008 to 2011 and then again from 2013 to 2016. He has also been the artistic director of the International Concerts Wolfegg in Germany for over 20 years.

=== 2006–present ===
Honeck became the general music director of the Staatsoper Stuttgart in the 2007–2008 season, with an initial contract for four years. During his tenure in Stuttgart, Honeck conducted productions of Berlioz's Les Troyens, Mozart's Idomeneo, Verdi's Aida, Strauss's Der Rosenkavalier, Poulenc's Dialogues of the Carmelites and Wagner's Lohengrin and Parsifal, among other works. Honeck formally concluded his tenure with the Staatsoper Stuttgart in 2011. In November 2023, the Bamberg Symphony announced the appointment of Honeck as one of its honorary conductors (Ehrendirigenten).

==== Pittsburgh Symphony Orchestra ====
In May 2006, in the US, Honeck first guest-conducted the Pittsburgh Symphony Orchestra (PSO). In November 2006, he returned for an additional guest-conducting engagement with the PSO. On 24 January 2007, the PSO named Honeck its ninth music director, effective with the 2008–2009 season for an initial contract of three years. In September 2009, the PSO announced the extension of Honeck's contract to the 2015–2016 season. In February 2012, the PSO announced the further extension of Honeck's contract through the 2019–2020 season. In September 2018, the PSO announced the further extension of Honeck's contract through the 2021–2022 season. In September 2021, the PSO announced a further extension of Honeck's contract as music director through the 2027–2028 season. In June 2026, the PSO announced the newest extension of Honeck's contract as its music director through the 2032–2033 season.

Honeck's work with the Pittsburgh Symphony Orchestra has been documented on recordings with the Exton and Reference labels. Honeck and the PSO have recorded four SACDs for Reference Recordings, of Strauss tone poems, Dvořák's Symphony No. 8 and Janáček's Jenůfa suite, Bruckner's Symphony No. 4, and Beethoven's Fifth and Seventh Symphonies. Honeck and the PSO's recordings of Bruckner's Symphony No. 4 and Dvořák's Symphony No. 8, and Janáček's Jenůfa suite were nominated for the Grammy Award for Best Orchestral Performance in 2015 and 2014, respectively.

==== Recent events ====
In September 2026, the Philharmonia Orchestra announced the appointment of Honeck as its next principal conductor, effective in September 2028. Also in September 2026, the San Francisco Symphony announced the appointment of Honeck to the newly-created position of Festival Director, with a contract of five years.

== Awards ==
The Austrian federal president awarded Honeck the honorary title of professor in 2016. He holds four Honorary Doctorates from Duquesne University, Carnegie Mellon University, Catholic University of America and Saint Vincent College. In 2018, he was named Artist of the Year by the International Classical Music Awards. On 28 January 2018, Honeck and the PSO were awarded the 2018 Grammy Award for Best Orchestral Performance for their recording of Shostakovich's Symphony No. 5 and Barber's Adagio for Strings. The recording won a second Grammy Award for Best Engineered Album (Mark Donahue, engineer).

== Personal life ==
Honeck lives in the village of Altach, Vorarlberg, Austria, with his wife Christiane and their six children. He is a devout Roman Catholic, known for praying prior to his performances.

== Selected discography ==
=== Pittsburgh Symphony Orchestra ===
- Mahler, Symphony No. 1, Exton (2009)
- Mahler, Symphony No. 4, Exton (2010)
- Richard Strauss, Ein Heldenleben, Exton (2010)
- Mahler, Symphony No. 3, Exton (2011)
- Tchaikovsky, Symphony No. 5, Exton (2011)
- Mahler, Symphony No. 5 in C-Sharp Minor, Exton (2012)
- Richard Strauss, Don Juan, Death and Transfiguration, Till Eulenspiegel, Reference (2013)
- Dvořák, Symphony No. 8 and Janáček, Jenufa Suite, Reference (2014)
- Beethoven, Symphonies No. 5 and 7, Reference (2015)
- Bruckner, Symphony No. 4, Reference (2015)
- Strauss, Elektra and Der Rosenkavalier Suites, Reference (2016)
- Tchaikovsky & Dvorak, Symphony No. 6 and Rusalka Fantasy, Reference (2016)
- Shostakovich, Symphony No. 5 and Barber: Adagio for Strings, Reference (2017)
- Beethoven: Symphony No. 3, Op. 55 ('Eroica') and Richard Strauss: Horn Concerto No. 1, Op. 11 (Live), Reference (2018)
- Bruckner: Symphony No. 9 in D Minor, Reference (2019)
- Tchaikovsky: Symphony No. 4 and Jonathan Leshnoff: Double Concerto for Clarinet and Bassoon, Reference (2020)
- Beethoven: Symphony No. 9, Op. 125 ('Choral'), Reference (2021)
- Brahms: Symphony No. 4 in E Minor, Op. 98 and Sir James MacMillan: Larghetto for Orchestra (Live), Reference (2021)
- Beethoven, Symphony No. 6 and Steven Stucky, Silent Spring, Reference (2022)
- Tchaikovsky, Symphony No. 5 and Schulhoff, 5 Pieces, Reference (2023)
- Bruckner, Symphony No. 7; Bates: Resurrexit, Reference (2024)
- 'Requiem: Mozart's Death in Words and Music' (2025)
- Dvořák: Symphony No. 9 ('From the New World') and Carlos Simon: Four Black American Dances (2026)

=== Other orchestras ===
- Mahler, Symphony No. 1, BBC Symphony Orchestra, BBC Music Magazine 93 (2000)
- Mozart, Wagner, Richard Strauss, et al., Matthias Goerne: German Opera Arias, Swedish Radio Symphony Orchestra, Exton (2000)
- Walter Braunfels: Jeanne d'Arc, Swedish Radio Symphony Orchestra, Eric Ericson Chamber Choir, Banse, Missenhardt, Stenswold, Decca (2001)
- Mozart, Requiem, Swedish Radio Symphony and Choir, Querstand (2001)
- Mozart, Così fan tutte (Salzburg Festival), Wiener Symphoniker, Martinez, Koch, Mathey, Degout, Donath, Aleen – Decca (2006)
- Allan Pettersson, Symphony No. 12, Swedish Radio Choir, CPO (2006)
- Braunfels: Große Messe, Op. 37, Staatsorchester, Staatsopernchor und Collegium Iuvenum Stuttgart, S. Schneider, G. Romberger, M. Klink, Decca (2010)
- Britten, Violin Concerto, Swedish Radio Symphony Orchestra, Frank Peter Zimmermann – Sony (2009)
- Dvořák, Violin Concerto in A minor, Anne-Sophie Mutter, Berliner Philharmoniker, Deutsche Grammophon (2013)
- Works by Johann Strauss II and his brothers, Wiener Symphoniker (WSO label), 2014
- Beethoven, Suppé, Richard Strauss, et al., 'Frühling in Wien', Wiener Symphoniker (WSO label), (2017)
- María Dueñas, 'Beethoven and Beyond', Wiener Symphoniker, Deutsche Grammophon (2023)

Cultural offices
Preceded by Evgeny Svetlanov	Principal Conductor, Swedish Radio Symphony Orchestra; 2000–2006	Succeeded by Daniel Harding
Preceded by Lothar Zagrosek	Generalmusikdirektor, Staatsoper Stuttgart; 2007–2011	Succeeded by Sylvain Cambreling
