= Gilbert Kaplan =

American businessman and financial publisher (1941–2016)

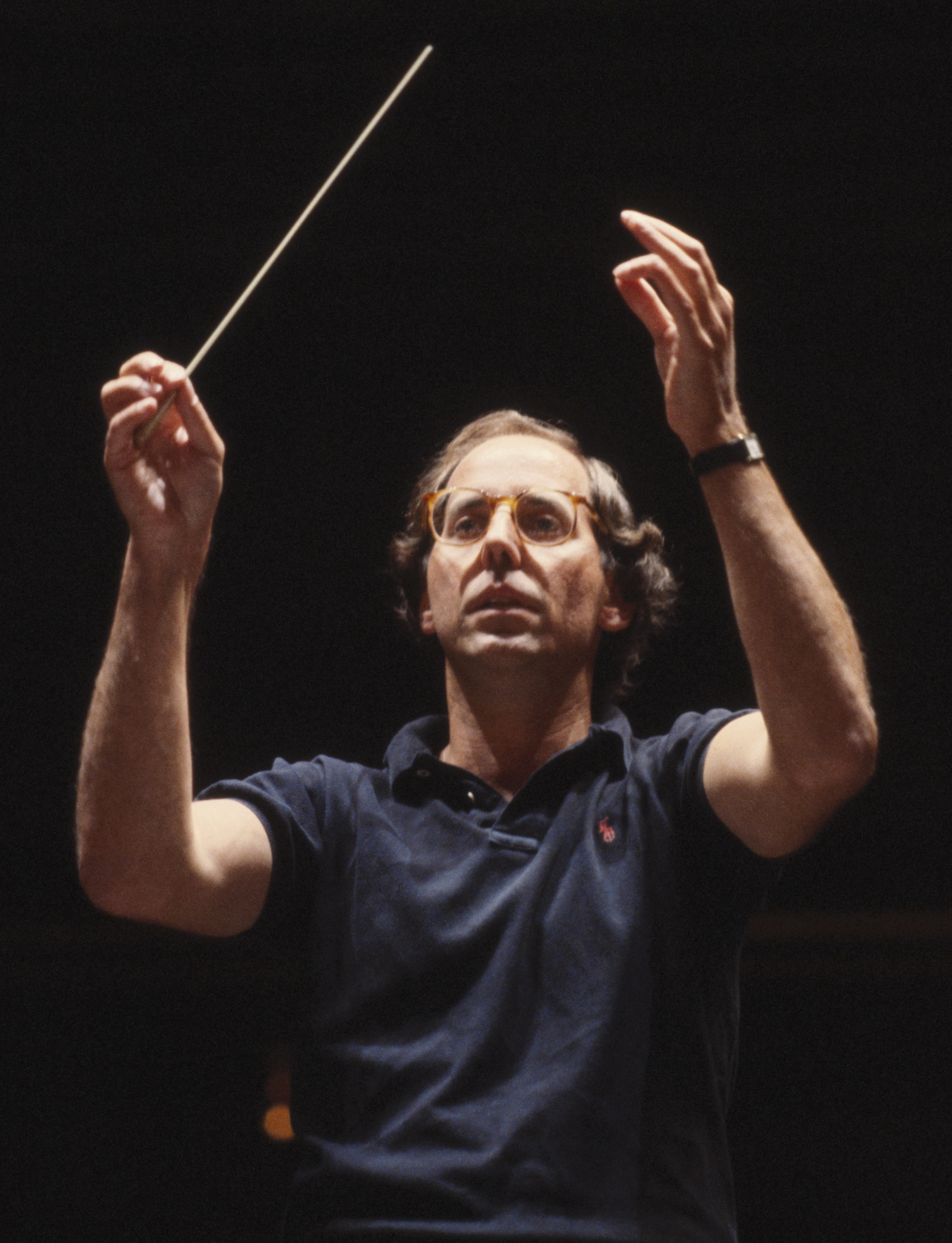
- Gilbert Kaplan conducting in 1982
- Born: March 3, 1941; New York City
- Died: January 1, 2016 (aged 74); Manhattan, New York City
- Education: Duke University; New York University School of Law
- Occupations: businessman financial publisher
- Spouse: Lena Biörck
- Children: 4
- Relatives: Gunnar Biörck (father-in-law)

Gilbert Edmund Kaplan (March 3, 1941 – January 1, 2016) was an American businessman and financial publisher. He was also an aficionado of the music of Gustav Mahler, and an amateur conductor of Mahler's Symphony No. 2.

== Biography ==
Kaplan was born at French Hospital in New York City on March 3, 1941, and grew up in Lawrence on Long Island. His older brother was the composer Joseph Brooks. Kaplan studied at Duke University, and earned a bachelor's degree from The New School for Social Research. He later studied at New York University School of Law. In 1963, Kaplan took a job as an economist with the American Stock Exchange, at a salary of $15,000 per year. Kaplan founded the magazine Institutional Investor in 1967. He was publisher of the magazine until 1990, and editor-in-chief for two more years, although he sold it in 1984. The New York Times reported: "The price was never disclosed but was rumored to be about $75 million."

Kaplan hosted on WNYC and WQXR for more than decade the show Mad About Music until 2012 where he interviewed famous people about their love for music. He was also on the board of WNYC trustees, and in 2000 became an Evening Division faculty member at the Juilliard School.

Kaplan married Lena Biörck, a Swedish interior designer and daughter of Gunnar Biörck, personal physician for the Swedish Royal family, in 1970. The couple had four children. Kaplan died in Manhattan, aged 74, of cancer.

=== Interest in the music of Gustav Mahler ===
Kaplan's interest in Mahler's Symphony No 2 dated back to 1965. In 1981, he began tutelage in conducting with Charles Zachary Bornstein. He rented Avery Fisher Hall in New York for his public conducting debut in 1982, leading the American Symphony and the Westminster Symphonic Choir. Originally, the orchestra had requested that no reviews be published, but Leighton Kerner of The Village Voice breached this requested embargo with a positive review of this performance. Subsequently, Kaplan conducted Mahler's Symphony No 2 in over 100 live performances over the remainder of his life. He established the Kaplan Foundation, dedicated to scholarship and the promotion of the music of Gustav Mahler. After personal research, he twice recorded Mahler's Second Symphony: with the London Symphony Orchestra in 1987, and with the Vienna Philharmonic in 2002. Mahler's Second Symphony was the only complete work he conducted in public, although he did separately record the Adagietto from Mahler's Symphony No. 5 in a studio recording.

Kaplan owned the autograph manuscript of Mahler's score of his Second Symphony and published a facsimile edition of the score in 1986. Tim Page wrote in The New York Times: "Only now will musicians, scholars and the general public be able to own a facsimile manuscript of one of the composer's symphonies." On 29 November 2016, the manuscript was sold at auction for £4,546,250, a record for any music manuscript at the time. He also owned one of Mahler's batons and the autograph manuscript of Mahler's song, "Ich bin der Welt abhanden gekommen", part of the Rückert-Lieder. A facsimile of this manuscript was published by the Kaplan Foundation in 2015. Both manuscripts were, at one time, on deposit at the Morgan Library & Museum in New York City. He was co-editor of the new critical edition of the Second Symphony as part of the Complete Critical Edition of Mahler's works.

Kaplan's conducting attracted criticism and praise, most controversially at his December 2008 New York Philharmonic performance. Steve Smith wrote in The New York Times of this concert:

"That Mr. Kaplan is no professional conductor was immediately apparent. Square-shouldered and stiff, he indulged in no flamboyant gymnastics. He conducted from memory, beating time proficiently and providing cues as needed. Only in a few passages, like the pages of heavenly bliss just before the first movement's tempo-sostenuto conclusion, did a curl of the lip suggest that he was swept up in his work. His efforts were evident throughout a performance of sharp definition and shattering power. From the acute punch of the opening notes, every detail of this huge, complex score came through with unusual clarity and impeccable balance. Every gesture had purpose and impact, and the performance as a whole had an inexorable sweep. ... It seems likely that no one is better equipped to reveal the impact of precisely what Mahler put on the page."

David Finlayson, a trombonist of the New York Philharmonic who performed at this concert, offered a different perspective:

"Having not previously heard either of Mr. Kaplan's two recordings of the symphony, nor having seen him conduct, I came to our rehearsals with an open mind. My initial impression was that Mr. Kaplan displays an arrogance and self-delusion that is off-putting. As a conductor, he can best be described as a very poor beater of time who far too often is unable to keep the ensemble together and allows most tempo transitions to fall where they may. His direction lacks few indications of dynamic control or balance and there is absolutely no attempt to give phrases any requisite shape. In rehearsal, he admitted to our orchestra that he is not capable of keeping a steady tempo and that he would have to depend on us for any stability in that department. Considering his Everest-sized ego, this admission must have caused him great consternation upon reflection. Mahler's wonderful use of the off stage brass in the fifth movement gave Kaplan much tribulation. One would think that after more than fifty performances of the work, even the most plebeian of conductors would have some understanding of how to bring together musicians that are separated by great distance. In the performance, these haunting moments of the symphony slipped away like some wayward musical slinky.

I have to take extreme exception to the many reviews I have read of his performances. Some critics have written that he brings the finest details of the work to the surface. If his past performances were anything like ours, Mr. Kaplan excels in ignoring the blizzard of Mahler's performance direction.

Much has been written about Mr. Kaplan's passion for Mahler's great symphony as if this emotion is unique to him. This assertion is an insult to all professional musicians who have dedicated their entire lives and have sacrificed much toward the preservation of all the great works of history's finest composers. His continued appearances are also an affront to all 'real' conductors who have toiled relentlessly for the recognition they duly deserve."

Peter Kenote, a violist in the New York Philharmonic at this concert, likewise commented about Kaplan:

"I think he's a charlatan. At best his conducting is incompetent. At worst it's laughable. I don't feel the New York Philharmonic should be the platform for his obsession."

In Kaplan's conducting engagements of Mahler's Symphony No 2, he did not accept a fee.

=== Kaplan Foundation ===
Kaplan set up The Kaplan Foundation in New York City to focus on scholarship and preservation with respect to the music of Gustav Mahler. The Kaplan Foundation has published facsimile editions of Mahler's autograph manuscript of the Second Symphony, the Adagietto movement of the Fifth Symphony and the song, "Ich bin der Welt abhanden gekommen". The foundation has produced Mahler Plays Mahler, a recording using piano rolls that Mahler made of his own compositions. These rolls are the only documents that exist of Mahler as a performer.

The foundation has also published Mahler Discography (together with editor Péter Fülöp), a guide to 2,774 recordings of Mahler's music; Mahler's Concerts, by Knud Martner, a compilation of the 323 known performances led by Mahler as a conductor or pianist; and The Mahler Album (editor Gilbert Kaplan), an illustrated biography containing all known photographs and a selection of drawings and sculptures of the composer.

Together with Universal Edition, the foundation is co-publisher of two scores of Mahler's Second Symphony: the New Critical Edition (editors Renate Stark-Voit and Gilbert Kaplan) and the Arrangement for Small Orchestra (by Gilbert Kaplan and Rob Mathes); and with C. F. Peters, co-publisher of the New Critical Edition of Mahler's Sixth Symphony, the latter published in 2010 under the general editorship of Reinhold Kubik.

==== Symphony No. 6 ====
Kaplan underwrote publication of a booklet, The correct movement order in Mahler's Sixth Symphony, which claimed the revised inner movement order of Andante / Scherzo as the single 'correct' order for the inner movements. He wrote a commentary in The New York Times on this subject. Similarly to this pamphlet, Kaplan claimed, in his preface to the 2010 edition of the Sixth Symphony, that the revised order of Andante / Scherzo was the "final" and "unequivocal" decision by Mahler. Kaplan's statement has been criticised as not in accordance with Mahler's actual compositional practices, such as from Herta Blaukopf and David Hurwitz:

"...in this question there is certainly no 'correct' or 'incorrect', no 'right' or 'wrong' – at best there is only an 'in the end'. Mahler's symphonies were subjected to minor and major revisions and developments as many times as they were performed. We can, therefore, refer only to the last state of his thoughts on the matter. What must be considered is that which is revealed by historical documents and that which is revealed by the music itself."

"Thus to insist, as Gilbert Kaplan does in his preface to the present edition, that Mahler's decision to place the Andante second, was 'final' and 'unequivocal' is terribly naïve, as well as irresponsible. No one who knows anything about Mahler's working habits, either with his own music or that of any of the composers that he conducted regularly, would use those words so inappropriately."

=== Popular culture ===
The 2022 film Tár includes an investment banker and amateur conductor named "Eliot Kaplan". Mark Swed criticized the choice, contrasting the "reptilian wannabe conductor" of the film with the real Kaplan, who he called a "kind man who died seven years ago and who cared deeply about music and people." Director Todd Field said that the character is "Kaplan in name only" and called Gilbert Kaplan "a shining example of absolute courage and inspiration".

== Publications ==
- Gilbert E. Kaplan: "How Mahler Performed His Second Symphony". The Musical Times, Vol. 127, No. 1718 (May 1986), pp. 266–267+269+271
- Gilbert Kaplan: The Mahler Album. Kaplan Foundation in association with Thames and Hudson, New York/London 1995, ISBN 0-500-97421-7; new, expanded edition: Kaplan Foundation, New York, 2011, ISBN 978-0-8109-9833-9
- Gilbert Kaplan: "In One Note of Mahler, a World of Meaning". The New York Times, 17 March 2002
- Gilbert Kaplan: The correct movement order in Mahler's Sixth symphony. Kaplan Foundation, New York, 2004, ISBN 0-9749613-0-2
- Gustav Mahler: Symphony No. 2 in C minor : Resurrection : facsimile. Kaplan Foundation, New York, 1986, ISBN 0-571-10064-3
- Gustav Mahler: Adagietto. Facsimile, documentation, recording. Gilbert E. Kaplan, ed. Kaplan Foundation, New York, 1992, ISBN 0-571-51322-0

== Discography ==
- Gustav Mahler: Symphony No. 2 in C minor "Resurrection". Benita Valente, soprano; Maureen Forrester, alto; Gilbert E Kaplan; London Symphony Chorus.; London Symphony Orchestra. 1988
- From Mahler With Love. Gustav Mahler: Adagietto, from Symphony No. 5; Gilbert E Kaplan; London Symphony Orchestra. 1992
- Mahler Plays Mahler. The Welte-Mignon piano rolls. Gilbert Kaplan, Executive Producer. 1993
- The Kaplan Mahler edition. 1996. (contains Symphony No. 2, Adagietto from Symphony No. 5, the Mahler piano rolls, recorded recollections of musicians who performed with Mahler, plus a CD-ROM part containing 150 pictures from The Mahler Album)
- Gustav Mahler: Symphony No. 2. Latonia Moore, soprano; Nadja Michael, mezzo-soprano; Gilbert Kaplan; Wiener Singverein; Wiener Philharmoniker. Deutsche Grammophon 2003
