= Aspects of America: Pulitzer Edition =

Studio album by Oregon Symphony
- Released: 2020

Aspects of America: Pulitzer Edition is an album by the Oregon Symphony. The recording earned Carlos Kalmar and the orchestra a Grammy Award nomination for Best Orchestral Performance.
