= Symphony No. 9 (Mahler) =

Symphony by Gustav Mahler

- by Gustav Mahler
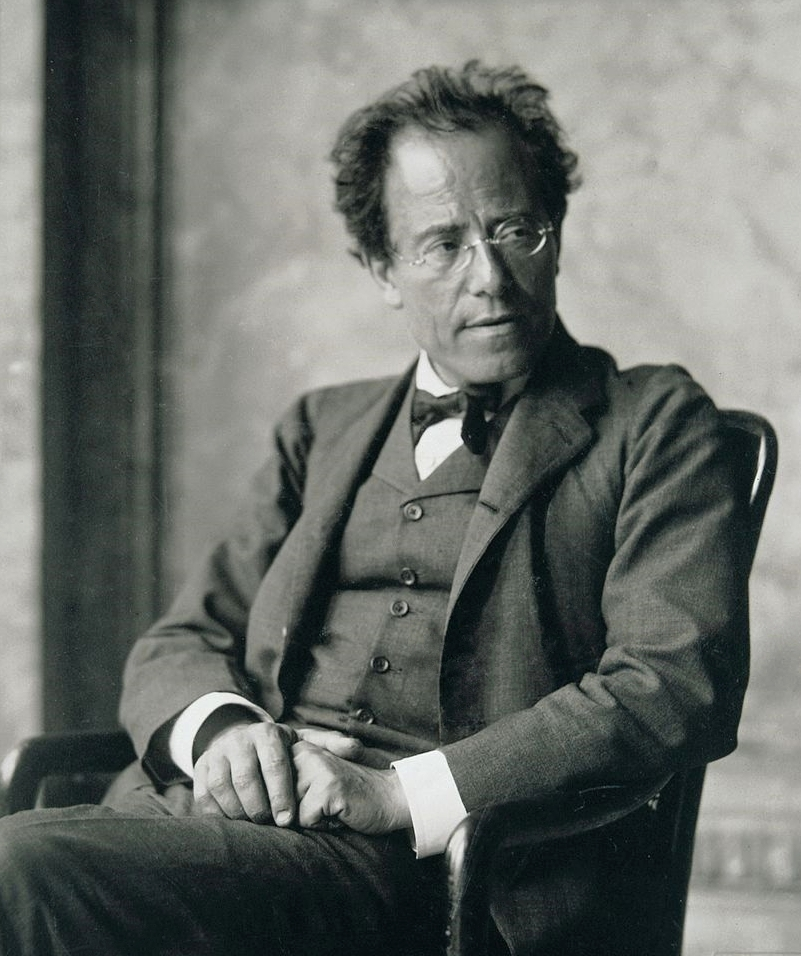
- Gustav Mahler in 1907
- Key: D major (– D-flat major)
- Composed: 1909: Toblach
- Published: 1912, Universal Edition
- Recorded: Bruno Walter, Vienna Philharmonic Orchestra, 1938
- Movements: 4

Premiere
- Date: 26 June 1912
- Location: Vienna, Austria-Hungary
- Conductor: Bruno Walter
- Performers: Vienna Philharmonic

The Symphony No. 9 by Gustav Mahler was written between 1908 and 1909, and was the last symphony that he completed. A typical performance takes about 75 to 90 minutes. A survey of conductors voted Mahler's Symphony No. 9 the fourth greatest symphony of all time in a ballot conducted by BBC Music Magazine in 2016. As in the case of his earlier Das Lied von der Erde, Mahler did not live to see his Symphony No. 9 performed.

Though the work is often described as being in the key of D major, the tonal scheme of the symphony as a whole is progressive. While the opening movement is in D major, the finale is in D♭ major.

== Instrumentation ==
The symphony is scored for a large orchestra, consisting of the following:

Woodwinds
piccolo
4 flutes
4 oboes (4th doubling cor anglais)
E♭ clarinet
3 B♭ and A clarinets
bass clarinet
4 bassoons (4th doubling contrabassoon)

Brass
4 horns
3 trumpets
3 trombones
tuba

Percussion
4 timpani
bass drum
snare drum
cymbals
triangle
tam-tam
3 deep bells in F♯, A, and B
glockenspiel

Strings
2 harps
1st violins
2nd violins
violas
cellos
double basses

== Structure ==
Symphony No. 9
I. Andante comodo

II. Im Tempo eines gemächlichen Ländlers. Etwas täppisch und sehr derb

III. Rondo-Burleske. Allegro assai. Sehr trotzig

IV. Adagio. Sehr langsam und noch zurückhaltend
Performed by Bruno Walter and the Vienna Philharmonic, 16 January 1938 in Vienna at the Musikverein

The symphony is in four movements:

1. Andante comodo (D major)
2. Im Tempo eines gemächlichen Ländlers. Etwas täppisch und sehr derb (C major)
3. Rondo-Burleske: Allegro assai. Sehr trotzig (A minor)
4. Adagio. Sehr langsam und noch zurückhaltend (D♭ major)

Although the symphony has the traditional number of movements, it is unusual in that the first and last are slow rather than fast. As is often the case with Mahler, one of the middle movements is a ländler.

=== I. Andante comodo ===
The first movement embraces a loose sonata form. The key areas provide a continuation of the tonal juxtaposition displayed in earlier works (notably Symphonies No. 6 and No. 7). The work opens with a hesitant, syncopated rhythmic motif (which Leonard Bernstein suggested is a depiction of Mahler's irregular heartbeat), which is heard throughout the movement.

The brief introduction also presents two other ideas: a four-note motif announced by the harp that provides much of the musical basis for the rest of the movement,

and a muted horn fanfare that is also heard later.

In the development, it is heard in the horns and clarinets in Mahler's original form, with a third descending into a fifth. At the height of the development, the trombones and tuba announce the rhythmic heartbeat motif, marked within the score "Mit höchster Gewalt" (with greatest force). It leads into a solemn funeral march, marked "Wie ein Kondukt" (like a funeral procession), on a timpani ostinato of the harp's four-note motif. Low bells are heard here for the first and only time in the symphony, accompanying the timpani in the four-note motif.

Near the end of the movement is a remarkable example of Mahler's linear polyphony, in which piccolo, flute, oboe, and solo violin imitate bird-calls. Alban Berg asserted that this section was a "vision of the hereafter". Allusions to other music in this movement include references to Ludwig van Beethoven's Piano Sonata Op. 81a and to Johann Strauss II's waltz Freuet Euch des Lebens, the latter first noted by Philip Barford in 1971.

=== II. Im Tempo eines gemächlichen Ländlers. Etwas täppisch und sehr derb ===
The second movement is a series of dances, and opens with a rustic ländler, which becomes distorted to the point that it no longer resembles a dance.

The movement contains shades of the second movement of Mahler's Symphony No. 2, in the distortion of a traditional dance into a bitter and sarcastic one. Traditional chord sequences are altered into near-unrecognizable variations, turning the rustic yet gradually decaying C major introductory ländler into a vicious whole-tone waltz, saturated with chromaticism and frenetic rhythms. Strewn amidst these sarcastic dances is a slower and calmer ländler which reintroduces the "sighing" motif from the first movement.

The movement ends with a cheeky pianissimo nod from the piccolo and contrabassoon.

=== III. Rondo-Burleske: Allegro assai. Sehr trotzig ===
The third movement, in the form of a rondo, displays the final maturation of Mahler's contrapuntal skills. It opens with a dissonant theme in the trumpet which is treated in the form of a double fugue.

The following five-note motif introduced by strings in unison recalls the second movement of his Fifth Symphony.

The addition of Burleske (a parody with imitations) to the title of the movement refers to the mixture of dissonance with Baroque counterpoint. Although the term "Burlesque" means "humorous", the actual "humor" of the movement is relatively small compared to the overall field of manic violence, considering only two small neo-classical sections that appear more like a flashback than playfulness.

=== IV. Adagio. Sehr langsam und noch zurückhaltend ===
The final movement, whose tempo marking Sehr langsam und noch zurückhaltend means literally "very slowly and holding back yet more" (implying an especially hesitant manner of performance even beyond what "very slowly" would suggest), opens with only strings. Commentators have noted the similarity of the opening theme in particular to the hymn tune "Eventide" (familiarly sung as "Abide with Me").

But most importantly it incorporates a direct quote from the Rondo-Burleske's middle section. Here it becomes an elegy. After several impassioned climaxes, the movement becomes increasingly fragmented and the coda ends quietly. On the closing pages, Mahler quotes the first violins from his own Kindertotenlieder: The day is fine on yonder heights.

The last note is marked ersterbend ("dying away"). The last two pages last for six minutes, an unprecedented amount of time for so few notes. Leonard Bernstein speculated at the end of his fifth Norton lecture that the entire movement is symbolically prophesying three kinds of death: Mahler's own impending death, the death of tonality, and the death of "Faustian" culture in all the arts.

== Mahler's death ==
Mahler died in May 1911, without ever hearing his Ninth Symphony performed. The work's ending is usually interpreted as his conscious farewell to the world, as it was composed following the death of his beloved daughter Maria Anna in 1907 and the diagnosis of his fatal heart disease. However, this notion is disputed inasmuch as Mahler felt that he was in good health at the time of the composition of the Ninth Symphony; he had had a very successful season (1909–10) as the conductor of the New York Philharmonic Orchestra and, before that, the Metropolitan Opera (New York). In his last letters, Mahler indicated that he was looking forward to an extensive tour with the orchestra for the 1910–11 season and anticipating a return for the 1911–1912 season. Moreover, Mahler worked on his unfinished Tenth Symphony until his death from endocarditis in May 1911.

Mahler was a superstitious man and believed in the so-called curse of the ninth, which he thought had already killed Beethoven, Schubert and Bruckner; this is proven by the fact that he refused to number his previous work Das Lied von der Erde as his ninth symphony, although it is often considered a symphony.

== Premieres ==
The work was premiered on 26 June 1912, at the Vienna Festival by the Vienna Philharmonic conducted by Bruno Walter. It was first published in the same year by Universal Edition.

- Dutch premiere: 2 May 1918, Amsterdam, with the Royal Concertgebouw Orchestra conducted by Willem Mengelberg
- UK premiere: 27 February 1930, Manchester with The Hallé conducted by Hamilton Harty
- American premiere: 16 October 1931, Boston, with the Boston Symphony Orchestra, conducted by Serge Koussevitzky
- Japanese premiere: 16 April 1967, Tokyo, with the Moscow Philharmonic Orchestra conducted by Kirill Kondrashin

== Interpretation ==
The enjoyment of Mahler's Ninth Symphony prompted the essayist Lewis Thomas to write the title essay in his Late Night Thoughts on Listening to Mahler's Ninth Symphony.

Many Mahler interpreters have been moved to speak with similar profundity about the work:

- I have once more played through Mahler's Ninth. The first movement is the most glorious he ever wrote. It expresses an extraordinary love of the earth, for Nature. The longing to live on it in peace, to enjoy it completely, to the very heart of one's being, before death comes, as irresistibly it does. – Alban Berg
- It is music coming from another world, it is coming from eternity. – Herbert von Karajan
- It is terrifying, and paralyzing, as the strands of sound disintegrate ... in ceasing, we lose it all. But in Mahler's ceasing, we have gained everything. – Leonard Bernstein
- [Mahler's] Ninth is most strange. In it, the author hardly speaks as an individual any longer. It almost seems as though this work must have a concealed author who used Mahler merely as his spokesman, as his mouthpiece. – Arnold Schoenberg
- Mahler's Ninth Symphony is not about death, but about dying. Death and dying are two entirely different matters. While working on the Ninth, I realized that I know of no other language apart from German in which the words death (Tod) and dying (sterben) have entirely different etymologies. ... the finale is just one sole extended act of dying, the disintegration of life. The last section, particularly the last page in the orchestra score, describes that situation so perfectly that it surpasses any other depiction, whether it be in literature or the fine arts. – Ádám Fischer

In the early half of the twentieth century, less favourable opinions of Mahler's symphonies as finished works were common. This quote, from 1932, is typical:

- Someday, some real friends of Mahler's will ... take a pruning knife and reduce his works to the length that they would have been if the composer had not stretched them out of shape; and then the great Mahler war will be over ... The Ninth Symphony would last about twenty minutes. – Deems Taylor

== Recordings ==
The Ninth Symphony has been recorded over a hundred times for commercial release on 78-rpm discs, LP, CD, or DVD. An incomplete list includes:

- Bruno Walter with the Vienna Philharmonic, 1938
- Hermann Scherchen with the Vienna Symphony, 1950
- Jascha Horenstein with the Vienna Symphony, 1952
- Paul Kletzki with the Israel Philharmonic Orchestra, 1954
- Hans Rosbaud with the Südwestfunk Symphonie Orchester, Baden-Baden, 1957
- Dimitri Mitropoulos with the New York Philharmonic, 1960
- Leopold Ludwig and the London Symphony Orchestra, 1960
- Dimitri Mitropoulos with the Vienna Philharmonic, 1960
- Bruno Walter with the Columbia Symphony Orchestra, 1962
- Sir John Barbirolli, with the Berlin Philharmonic, 1964
- Kirill Kondrashin with the Moscow State Philharmonic, 1964
- Leonard Bernstein with the New York Philharmonic, 1965
- Jascha Horenstein with the London Symphony Orchestra, April, 1966
- Jascha Horenstein with the London Symphony Orchestra, September, 1966
- Karel Ančerl with the Czech Philharmonic, 1966
- Otto Klemperer and the New Philharmonia Orchestra, 1967.
- Rafael Kubelík with the Bavarian Radio Symphony Orchestra, 1967
- Georg Solti with the London Symphony Orchestra, 1967
- Václav Neumann with the Leipzig Gewandhaus Orchestra, 1967
- George Szell with the Cleveland Orchestra, 1968
- Bernard Haitink, with the Royal Concertgebouw Orchestra, 1969
- Maurice Abravanel with the Utah Symphony, 1969
- Leonard Bernstein with the Vienna Philharmonic, 1971
- Carlo Maria Giulini with the Chicago Symphony Orchestra, 1976 (Grammy Award winner)
- Wyn Morris with the Sinfonica of London, 1978
- James Levine with the Philadelphia Orchestra, 1979
- Kurt Sanderling with the Berlin Symphony Orchestra, 1979
- Klaus Tennstedt with the London Philharmonic Orchestra, 1979
- Leonard Bernstein with the Berlin Philharmonic, 1979 (Grammy Award winner)
- Eliahu Inbal with the Japan Philharmonic Orchestra, 1979
- Herbert von Karajan with the Berlin Philharmonic, 1979–80
- Václav Neumann with the Czech Philharmonic, 1982
- Georg Solti with the Chicago Symphony Orchestra, 1982 (Grammy Award winner)
- Herbert von Karajan with the Berlin Philharmonic, 1982 (Gramophone Record of the Year)
- Lorin Maazel with the Vienna Philharmonic, 1984
- Leonard Bernstein with the Royal Concertgebouw Orchestra, 1985
- Kazuo Yamada with the New Japan Philharmonic, 1986
- Eliahu Inbal with the Frankfurt Radio Symphony, 1986
- Claudio Abbado with the Vienna Philharmonic, 1986
- Bernard Haitink, with the Royal Concertgebouw Orchestra, 1987
- Klaus Tennstedt, with the New York Philharmonic, 1988
- Michael Gielen with the Southwest German Radio Symphony Orchestra, Baden-Baden, 1990
- James Judd with the Gustav Mahler Jugendorchester, 1990
- Libor Pešek with the Royal Liverpool Philharmonic, 1990
- Gary Bertini with the WDR Symphony Orchestra Cologne, 1991
- Leif Segerstam with the Danish Radio Symphony Orchestra, 1991
- Kurt Sanderling with the Philharmonia Orchestra, 1992
- Yevgeny Svetlanov with the Russian State Symphony Orchestra, 1992
- Sir Simon Rattle with the Vienna Philharmonic, 1993
- Bernard Haitink with the European Community Youth Orchestra, 1993
- Rudolf Barshai with the Moscow Radio Symphony Orchestra, 1993
- Giuseppe Sinopoli with the Philharmonia Orchestra, 1993
- Kurt Masur with the New York Philharmonic, 1994
- Michael Halász with the Polish National Radio Symphony Orchestra, NAXOS 8.550535-36, 1994
- Pierre Boulez with the Chicago Symphony Orchestra, 1995 (Grammy Award winner)
- Christoph von Dohnányi with the Cleveland Orchestra, 1997
- Jesús López Cobos with the Cincinnati Symphony Orchestra, 1997
- Giuseppe Sinopoli with the Staatskapelle Dresden, 1997
- James Levine with the Munich Philharmonic, 1999
- Benjamin Zander with the Philharmonia Orchestra, 1999
- Claudio Abbado with the Berlin Philharmonic, 1999
- Seiji Ozawa with the Boston Symphony Orchestra, 2002
- Michael Gielen with the Südwestfunk Symphonie Orchester, Baden-Baden, 2003
- Riccardo Chailly with the Royal Concertgebouw Orchestra, 2004
- Claudio Abbado with the Gustav Mahler Jugendorchester, 2004
- Michael Tilson Thomas with the San Francisco Symphony, 2005
- Gerard Schwarz with the Royal Liverpool Philharmonic, 2006
- Daniel Barenboim with the Staatskapelle Berlin, 2006 (CD)
- Ken'ichiro Kobayashi with the Japan Philharmonic Orchestra, 2006
- Zdeněk Mácal with the Czech Philharmonic, 2007
- Daniel Barenboim with the Staatskapelle Berlin, 2007 (DVD)
- Jonathan Nott with the Bamberg Symphony, 2008
- Sir Simon Rattle with the Berlin Philharmonic, 2007
- Esa-Pekka Salonen with the Philharmonia Orchestra, 2009
- Eiji Oue with the Sinfonieorchester des Norddeutschen Rundfunks, Hamburg, 2009
- Alan Gilbert with the Royal Stockholm Philharmonic, 2009
- David Zinman with the Tonhalle-Orchester Zürich, 2009
- Jukka-Pekka Saraste with the WDR Symphony Orchestra of Koln, 2009
- Sir Roger Norrington with the Stuttgart Radio Symphony Orchestra, 2010
- Seiji Ozawa with the Saito Kinen Orchestra, 2010
- Claudio Abbado with the Lucerne Festival Orchestra, 2010
- Valery Gergiev with the London Symphony Orchestra, 2011
- Bernard Haitink with the Bavarian Radio Symphony Orchestra, 2011
- Bernard Haitink with the Royal Concertgebouw Orchestra, 2011 (DVD & Blu-ray)
- Lorin Maazel with the Philharmonia Orchestra, 2011
- Gustavo Dudamel with the Los Angeles Philharmonic, 2013
- Eliahu Inbal with the Tokyo Metropolitan Symphony Orchestra, 2014
- Myung-whun Chung with the Seoul Philharmonic Orchestra, 2014
- Donald Runnicles with the BBC Scottish Symphony Orchestra, 2014
- Daniel Barenboim with the La Scala Philharmonic Orchestra, Milan 2014
- Michael Schønwandt with the Danish National Symphony Orchestra, 2014
- Iván Fischer with the Budapest Festival Orchestra, 2015
- Sir Mark Elder with the Hallé Orchestra, 2015
- Ádám Fischer with the Düsseldorf Symphony, 2019
- Bernard Haitink with the Royal Concertgebouw Orchestra, 2019
- Bernard Haitink with the Berlin Philharmonic, 2021
- Osmo Vänskä with the Minnesota Orchestra, 2023
- David Bernard with the Park Avenue Chamber Symphony, 2025
