= Symphony No. 3 (Copland) =

Symphonic composition by American composer Aaron Copland

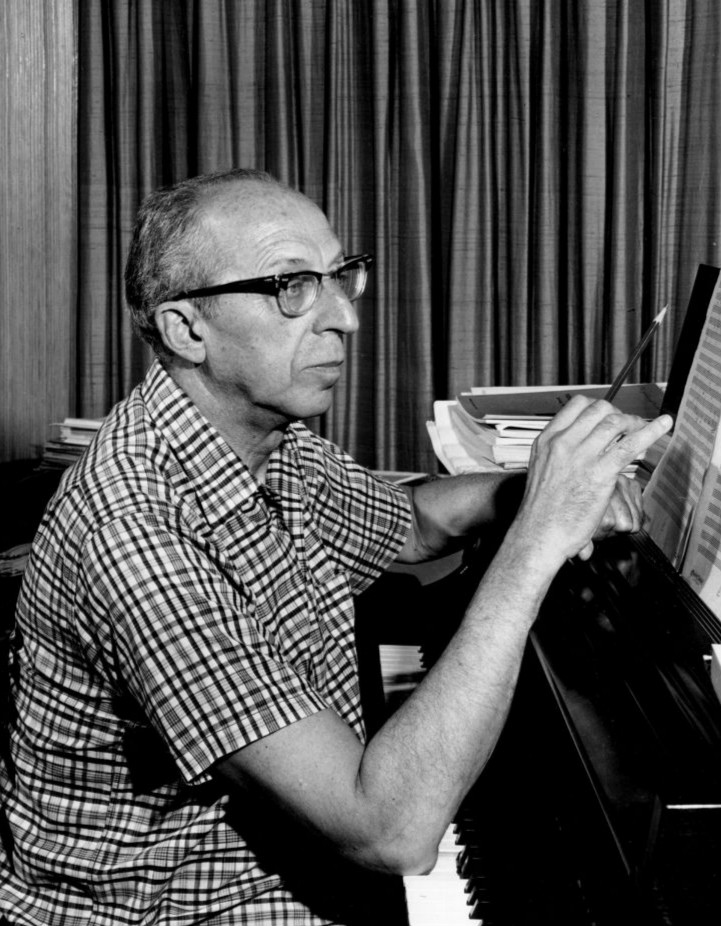
Aaron Copland in 1962

Symphony No. 3 was Aaron Copland's final symphony. It was written between 1944 and 1946, and its first performance took place on October 18, 1946 with the Boston Symphony Orchestra performing under Serge Koussevitzky. If the early Dance Symphony is included in the count, it is actually Copland's fourth symphony.

== Description ==
Written at the end of World War II, it is known as the essential American symphony that fuses his distinct "Americana" style of the ballets (Rodeo, Appalachian Spring, etc.) with the form of the symphony, which has generally been a European-dominated musical form. The Fanfare for the Common Man, written in 1942, is used as a theme in the fourth movement. Various fragments from Fanfare are also used for primary thematic material in the first three movements.

The first movement (Molto moderato) opens with a simple theme in the woodwinds and strings, which is echoed warmly throughout the orchestra, before quickly heightening into a brassy fanfare (in which we get our first hints of the Fanfare for the Common Man theme.)

The movement ends as peacefully as it started, but we are quickly snapped out of the reverie with the thunderous timpani thump that launches the lively scherzo into action.

The whirling second movement (Allegro molto) features a dashing, boisterous theme, settling into gentler, pastoral segment but ending exuberantly.

The third movement (Andantino quasi allegretto) opens slowly and contemplatively, featuring Copland's typically sparse and almost ambiguous harmonies. It digresses into a frisky dance-like passage, vaguely Latin American in tone, before transitioning uninterrupted into the finale (Molto deliberato – Allegro risoluto), where we hear a pianissimo version of the Fanfare for the Common Man, and then the fanfare in its full glory.

The duration of this movement is spent primarily with the development and recapitulation of the Fanfare melody: Copland gives it a dazzling contrapuntal treatment while at the same time managing to introduce an entirely new theme. The symphony closes majestically with a final reprise of both the Fanfare and the symphony's opening motif.

In 1947 Leonard Bernstein, while performing the work in Israel, removed some 10 bars from the fourth movement without Copland's consent. Later on, the composer agreed to these cuts, which were incorporated in the 1966 edition published by Boosey & Hawkes. However, in June 2015, Boosey & Hawkes published a new performing edition in which the cuts have been restored to conform with the original 1946 manuscript. The overall tone of the work is one of heroism and dignity, and it leaves an appropriately stirring impression.

Note that the Fanfare in the fourth movement is not a direct copy of the stand-alone work Fanfare for the Common Man. There are numerous subtle changes, including a new introduction (a woodwind duet begins the fourth movement), two key changes, and different percussion parts.

== Instrumentation ==
The symphony is scored for a large orchestra, comprising piccolo, 3 flutes (3rd doubling 2nd piccolo), 3 oboes (3rd doubling cor anglais), 2 clarinets in B♭, clarinet in E♭, bass clarinet, 2 bassoons, contrabassoon, 4 horns in F, 4 trumpets in B♭, 3 trombones, tuba, timpani, cymbals, bass drum, tenor drum, snare drum, triangle, tamtam, glockenspiel, xylophone, anvil, claves, ratchet, whip, tubular bells, wood block, piano, celesta, 2 harps, and strings.

== Discography ==
Year	Conductor	Orchestra	Label	Notes
1947	George Szell	New York Philharmonic	Classical Roots	Radio broadcast (18 December 1947)
1953	Antal Doráti	Minneapolis Symphony Orchestra	Mercury Records	Premiere recording
1959	Aaron Copland	London Symphony Orchestra	Everest Records	
1967	Leonard Bernstein	New York Philharmonic	Columbia Masterworks	
1970	Aaron Copland	Berlin Philharmonic	Testament	Recorded live in 1970, released on CD in 2017
1978	Aaron Copland	Philharmonia Orchestra	Columbia Masterworks	
1986	Leonard Bernstein	New York Philharmonic	Deutsche Grammophon	
1986	Eduardo Mata	Dallas Symphony Orchestra	Angel Records (EMI)	
1989	Yoel Levi	Atlanta Symphony Orchestra	Telarc	
1990	Leonard Slatkin	St. Louis Symphony Orchestra	RCA Victor Red Seal	
1996	Neeme Järvi	Detroit Symphony Orchestra	Chandos Records	
2000	Eiji Oue	Minnesota Orchestra	Reference Recordings	
2002	James Judd	New Zealand Symphony Orchestra	Naxos Records	
2010	Leon Botstein	American Symphony Orchestra	Digital release by the ASO	Premiere orchestral recording of the original 1946 version (all prior recordings were the 1966 published version with finale cuts)
2014	Lt. Col. Jason Fettig	United States Marine Band	Altissimo Recordings	Final movement only; 1946 version as transcription for wind band
2015	Carlos Kalmar	Oregon Symphony	Pentatone	1966 published version (with finale cuts)
2017	Leonard Slatkin	Detroit Symphony Orchestra	Naxos Records	Second orchestral recording of the original 1946 version
2018	John Wilson	BBC Philharmonic	Chandos Records	Third orchestral recording of the original 1946 version
2019	Carlos Miguel Prieto	The Orchestra of the Americas	Linn Records	Fourth orchestral recording of the original 1946 version
2020	Michael Tilson Thomas	San Francisco Symphony	SFS Media	1966 published version (with finale cuts)
2026	Antonio Pappano	London Symphony Orchestra	LSO Live	Original 1946 version of finale
