= Symphony No. 2 (Mahler) =

Symphony by Gustav Mahler

- Resurrection
- by Gustav Mahler
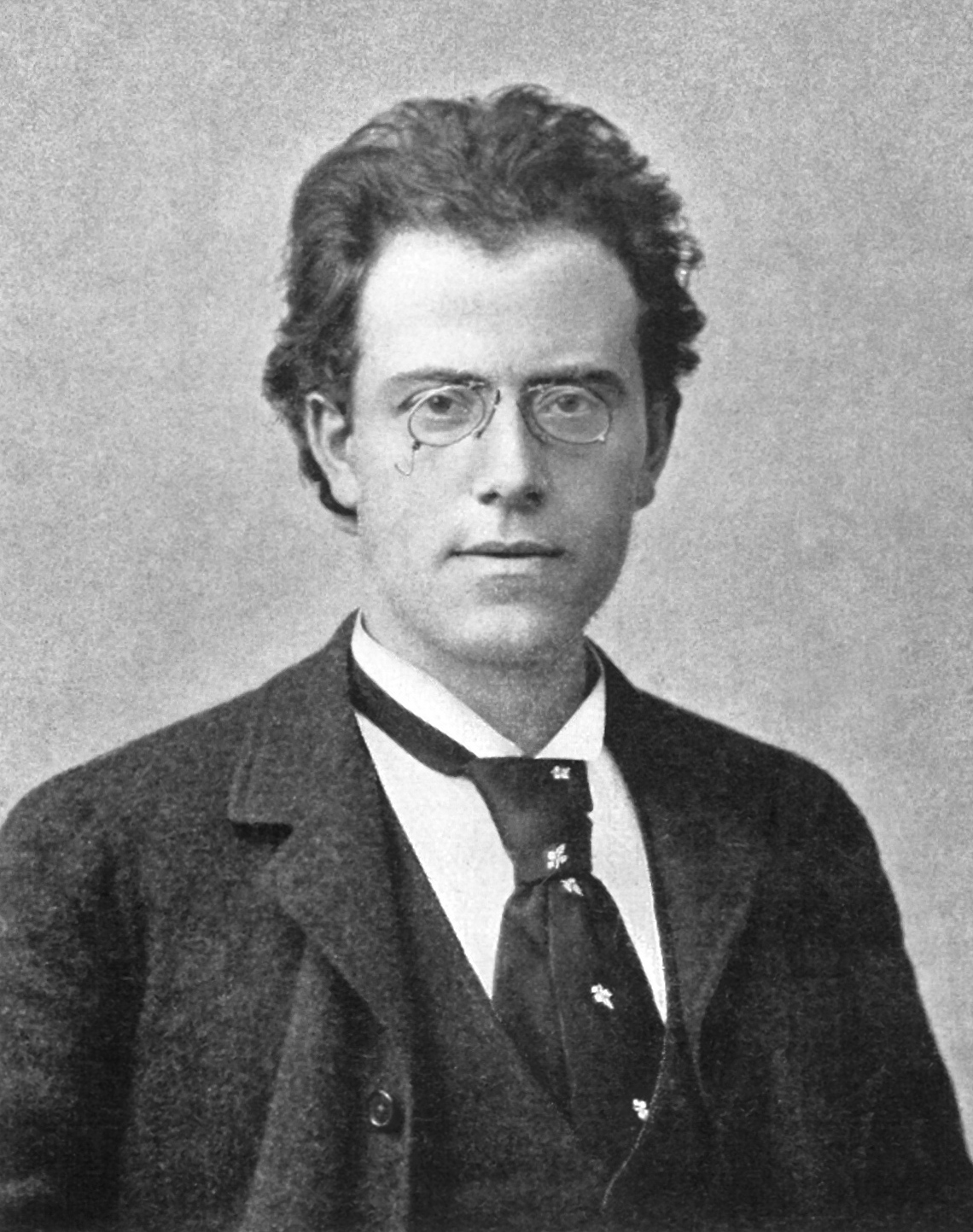
- Mahler in 1892
- Key: C minor – E♭ major
- Text: "Urlicht" from Des Knaben Wunderhorn; "Die Auferstehung" by Klopstock; Gustav Mahler
- Language: German
- Composed: 1888–1894
- Published: 1897 (Friedrich Hofmeister Musikverlag)
- Recorded: 1924 Oskar Fried, Berlin State Opera Orchestra
- Duration: 80–90 min
- Movements: 5
- Scoring: 2 voices (Soprano and Alto); mixed choir (SATB); orchestra

Premiere
- Date: 13 December 1895
- Location: Berlin
- Conductor: Gustav Mahler
- Performers: Berlin Philharmonic Orchestra

The Symphony No. 2 in C minor by Gustav Mahler, also known as the Resurrection Symphony, was written between 1888 and 1894, and first performed in 1895. This symphony was one of Mahler's most popular and successful works during his lifetime. In this large work, the composer further developed the creativity of "sound of the distance" and creating a "world of its own", aspects already seen in his First Symphony. The work is usually performed at a duration of 80 to 90 minutes, and is conventionally labelled as being in the key of C minor; the New Grove Dictionary of Music and Musicians labels the work's tonality as C minor–E♭ major. It was voted the fifth-greatest symphony of all time in a survey of conductors carried out by the BBC Music Magazine.

== Origin ==
Mahler completed what would become the first movement of the symphony in 1888 as a single-movement symphonic poem called Totenfeier (Funeral Rites). Some sketches for the second movement also date from that year. Mahler wavered five years on whether to make Totenfeier the opening movement of a symphony, although his manuscript does label it as a symphony. In 1893, he composed the second and third movements. The finale was the problem. While thoroughly aware he was inviting comparison with Beethoven's Symphony No. 9—both symphonies use a chorus as the centerpiece of a final movement which begins with references to and is much longer than those preceding it—Mahler knew he wanted a vocal final movement. Finding the right text for this movement proved long and perplexing.

When Mahler took up his appointment at the Hamburg Opera in 1891, he found the other important conductor there to be Hans von Bülow, who was in charge of the city's symphony concerts. Bülow, not known for his kindness, was impressed by Mahler. His support was not diminished by his failure to like or understand Totenfeier when Mahler played it for him on the piano. Bülow told Mahler that Totenfeier made Tristan und Isolde sound to him like a Haydn symphony. As Bülow's health worsened, Mahler substituted for him. Bülow's death in 1894 greatly affected Mahler. At the funeral, Mahler heard a setting of Friedrich Gottlieb Klopstock's poem "Die Auferstehung" (The Resurrection), where the dictum calls out "Rise again, yes, you shall rise again / My dust".

"It struck me like lightning, this thing," he wrote to conductor Anton Seidl, "and everything was revealed to me clear and plain." Mahler used the first two verses of Klopstock's hymn, then added verses of his own that dealt more explicitly with redemption and resurrection. He finished the finale and revised the orchestration of the first movement in 1894, then inserted the song "Urlicht" (Primal Light) as the penultimate movement. This song was probably written in 1892 or 1893.

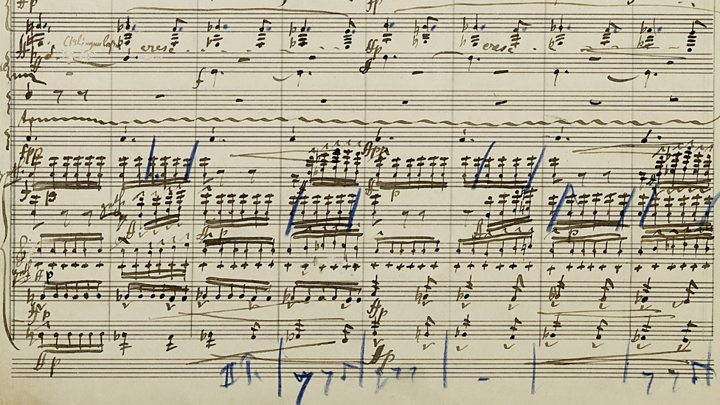
Autograph manuscript of the symphony

Mahler initially devised a narrative programme (actually several variant versions) for the work, which he showed to a number of friends (including Natalie Bauer-Lechner and Max Marschalk). He even had one of these versions printed in the program book at the premiere in Dresden on 20 December 1901. In this programme, the first movement represents a funeral and asks questions such as "Is there life after death?"; the second movement is a remembrance of happy times in the life of the deceased; the third movement represents a view of life as meaningless activity; the fourth movement is a wish for release from life without meaning; and the fifth movement – after a return of the doubts of the third movement and the questions of the first – ends with a fervent hope for everlasting, transcendent renewal, a theme that Mahler would ultimately transfigure into the music of Das Lied von der Erde. As generally happened, Mahler later withdrew all versions of the programme from circulation.

== Publication ==
The work was first published in 1897 by Friedrich Hofmeister. The rights were transferred to Josef Weinberger shortly thereafter, and finally to Universal Edition, which released a second edition in 1910. A third edition was published in 1952, and a fourth, critical edition in 1970, both by Universal Edition. As part of the new complete critical edition of Mahler's symphonies being undertaken by the Gustav Mahler Society, a new critical edition of the Second Symphony was produced as a joint venture between Universal Edition and the Kaplan Foundation. Its world premiere performance was given on 18 October 2005 at the Royal Albert Hall in London with Gilbert Kaplan conducting the Royal Philharmonic Orchestra.

Reproductions of earlier editions have been released by Dover and by Boosey & Hawkes. The Kaplan Foundation published an extensive facsimile edition with additional materials in 1986. 1989 saw the publication of an arrangement by Bruno Walter for piano four hands.

In 2024, the Austrian music publisher Universal Edition published a version of the symphony for chamber ensemble, soloists, and choir, arranged by Germán García Vargas.

== Instrumentation ==
The symphony is scored for large orchestra, consisting of the following instruments.

Woodwinds
4 flutes (all doubling piccolos)
4 oboes (3rd doubling cor anglais, 4th used only in mvmt. 5, doubling cor anglais)
3 B♭, A, C clarinets (3rd doubling bass clarinet)
2 E♭ clarinets (2nd doubling 4th clarinet, doubling when fortissimo where possible)
4 bassoons (3rd doubling contrabassoon, 4th used only in mvmt. 5 and doubling contrabassoon)

Brass
10 horns (7th–10th used only in mvmt. 5, both offstage and onstage)
10 trumpets (5th and 6th used only in mvmt. 5, onstage. 7th–10th used only in mvmt. 5, offstage)
4 trombones
1 tuba

Percussion
2 sets of timpani (a third player is required but only in mvmt. 5, offstage)
2 bass drums (2nd with a cymbal attached, used only in mvmt. 5, offstage)
several snare drums (used only in mvmt. 5)
cymbals (crash and suspended)
2 triangles (2nd used only in mvmt. 5, offstage)
2 tam-tams (high and low)
rute (used only in mvmt. 3)
3 deep, untuned bells (used only in mvmt. 5)
glockenspiel

Keyboards
organ (used only in mvmt. 5)
Voices
soprano solo (used only in mvmt. 5)
alto solo (used only in mvmts. 4 and 5)
mixed chorus (used only in mvmt. 5)

Strings

2 harp parts (several per part)

1st violins
2nd violins
violas
cellos
double basses (several with low C string)

The score also calls for a ‘Fernorchester’ – a small extra orchestra outside the concert hall.

== Form ==
The work in its finished form has five movements.

1. Allegro maestoso
2. Andante moderato
3. In ruhig fließender Bewegung (With quietly flowing movement)
4. "Urlicht" (Primal light)
5. Im Tempo des Scherzos (In the tempo of the scherzo)

=== I. Allegro maestoso ===
"Totenfeier" – I. Allegro maestoso
Performed by Barbara Schubert and the Dupage Symphony orchestra

The first movement is marked Mit durchaus ernstem und feierlichem Ausdruck (With complete gravity and solemnity of expression). It is written in C minor, but passes through a number of different moods and resembles a funeral march.

The movement's formal structure is modified sonata form. The exposition is repeated in a varied form (from rehearsal number 4 through 15, as Ludwig van Beethoven often did in his late string quartets). The development presents several ideas that will be used later in the symphony, including a theme based on the Dies irae plainchant.

Mahler uses a somewhat modified tonal framework for the movement. The secondary theme, first presented in E major (enharmonic of F♭ major, Neapolitan of E♭), begins its second statement in C major, a key in which it is not expected until the recapitulation.

The statement in the recapitulation, coincidentally, is in the original E major (F♭ major). The eventual goal of the symphony, E♭ major, is briefly hinted at after rehearsal 17, with a theme in the trumpets that returns in the finale.

Following this movement, Mahler calls in the score for a gap of five minutes before the second movement. This pause is rarely observed today. Often conductors will meet Mahler half way, pausing for a few minutes while the audience takes a breather and settles down and the orchestra retunes in preparation for the rest of the piece. Julius Buths received this instruction from Mahler personally, prior to a 1903 performance in Düsseldorf; however, he chose instead to place the long pause between the fourth and fifth movements, for which Mahler congratulated him on his insight, sensitivity, and daring to go against his stated wishes.

A practical way of following Mahler's original indication is to have the two soloists and the chorus enter the stage only after the first movement. This creates a natural separation between the first movement and the rest of the symphony and also saves the singers more than twenty minutes of sitting on stage. One can get an idea of Mahler's intention through a comparison with his Symphony No. 3, where – due to the length of the piece – a real break after the first movement (as between two acts of an opera) is highly recommended, and indeed indicated by Mahler. As in the case of Symphony No. 2, this is not always observed nowadays.

=== II. Andante moderato ===
II. Andante moderato
Performed by Barbara Schubert and the Dupage Symphony orchestra

The second movement is marked Sehr gemächlich. Nie eilen. (Very leisurely. Never rush.) It is a delicate Ländler in A♭ major.

It has two contrasting sections of slightly darker music.

This slow movement itself is contrasting to the two adjacent movements. Structurally, it is one of the simplest movements in Mahler's whole output. It is the remembrance of the joyful times in the life of the deceased.

=== III. In ruhig fließender Bewegung ===
III. In ruhig fließender Bewegung
Performed by Barbara Schubert and the Dupage Symphony orchestra

The third movement is a scherzo in C minor. It opens with two strong, short timpani strokes.

It is followed by two softer strokes and then by more even softer strokes which establish the tempo of the movement. After which the main theme appears in the violins, marked Sehr Gemächlich. Nicht eilen (Very leisurely. No rushing).

Mahler quoted Hans Rott's Symphony No.1 third movement in this scherzo.

Mahler called the climax of the movement, a blistering B♭m/C chord in triple-forte which occurs near the end, sometimes a "cry of despair", and sometimes a "death shriek".

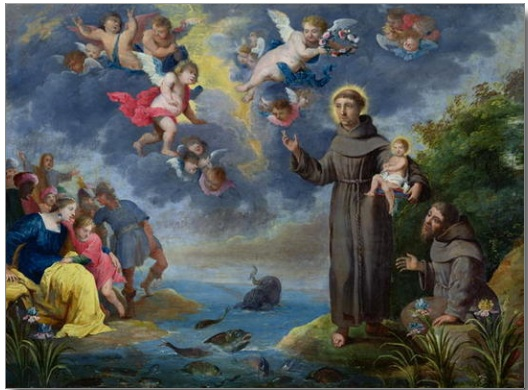
St. Anthony of Padua Preaching to the Fish, by Victor Wolfvoet II

The movement is based on Mahler's setting of "Des Antonius von Padua Fischpredigt" from Des Knaben Wunderhorn, which Mahler composed almost concurrently; in correspondence, Mahler expressed amusement that his sinuous musical setting could imply St. Anthony of Padua was himself drunk as he preached to the fish.

In 1967–68, the movement was used by Luciano Berio for the third movement of his Sinfonia, where it is used as the framework for constructing a musical collage of works from throughout the Western classical tradition.

=== IV. "Urlicht" ===
IV. "Urlicht"
Performed by Barbara Schubert and the Dupage Symphony orchestra. Singer unknown.

The fourth movement, "Urlicht" (Primal Light) is marked Sehr feierlich, aber schlicht (Very solemn, but simple). It is a Wunderhorn song, sung by an alto, which serves as an introduction to the Finale. The song, set in the remote key of D♭ major, illustrates the longing for relief from worldly woes, leading without a break to the response in the Finale.

=== V. Im Tempo des Scherzos ===
V. Im Tempo des Scherzos
Performed by Barbara Schubert and the Dupage Symphony orchestra

The finale is the longest movement, typically lasting over half an hour. It is divided into two large parts, the second of which begins with the entry of the chorus and whose form is governed by the text of this movement. The first part is instrumental, and very episodic, containing a wide variety of moods, tempi and keys, with much of the material based on what has been heard in the previous movements, although it also loosely follows sonata principles. New themes introduced are used repeatedly and altered.

The movement opens with a long introduction, beginning with the "cry of despair" that was the climax of the third movement, followed by the quiet presentation of a theme (another quotation from Hans Rott's Symphony No.1) which reappears as structural music in the choral section.

This is followed by a call in the offstage horns.

The first theme group reiterates the Dies irae theme from the first movement and then introduces the "resurrection" theme to which the chorus will sing their first words, and finally a fanfare.

The second theme is a long orchestral recitative, which provides the music for the alto solo in the choral section.

The exposition concludes with a restatement of the first theme group. This long opening section serves to introduce a number of themes, which will become important in the choral part of the finale.

The development section is what Mahler calls the "march of the dead". It begins with two long drum rolls, which include the use of the gongs. In addition to developing the Dies irae and resurrection themes and motives from the opening cry of despair, this section also states, episodically, a number of other themes, based on earlier material. The recapitulation overlaps with the march, and only brief statements of the first theme group are restated. The orchestral recitative is fully recapitulated, and is accompanied this time by offstage interruptions from a band of brass and percussion (which some had explained as the apocalypse's seven trumpets). This builds to a climax, which leads into a restatement of the opening introductory section. The horn call is expanded into Mahler's "Great Summons", a transition into the choral section.

Tonally, this first large part, the instrumental half of the movement, is organized in F minor. After the introduction, which recalls two keys from earlier movements, the first theme group is presented wholly in F minor, and the second theme group in the subdominant, B♭ minor. The restatement of the first theme group occurs in the dominant, C major. The development explores a number of keys, including the mediant, A♭ major, and the parallel major, F major. Unlike the first movement, the second theme is recapitulated as expected in the tonic key. The restatement of the introduction is thematically and tonally a transition to the second large part, moving from C♯ minor to the enharmonic parallel major, D♭ major — the enharmonic dominant of F♯ minor — in which the Great Summons is stated. The Epiphany comes in, played by the flute, in a high register, and featuring trumpets, that play offstage. The choral section begins in G♭ major.

The chorus comes in quietly a little past the halfway point of the movement.

The choral section is organized primarily by the text, using musical material from earlier in the movement. (The B♭ below the bass clef occurs four times in the choral bass part: three at the chorus' hushed entrance and again on the words "Hör' auf zu beben". It is the lowest vocal note in standard classical repertoire. Mahler instructs basses incapable of singing the note remain silent rather than sing the note an octave higher.) Each of the first two verses is followed by an instrumental interlude; the alto and soprano solos, "O Glaube", based on the recitative melody, precede the fourth verse, sung by the chorus; and the fifth verse is a duet for the two soloists.

The opening two verses are presented in G♭ major, the solos and the fourth verse in B♭ minor (the key in which the recitative was originally stated), and the duet in A♭ major. The goal of the symphony, E♭ major, the relative major of the opening C minor, is achieved when the chorus picks up the words from the duet, "Mit Flügeln", although after eight measures the music gravitates to G major (but never cadences on it).

E♭ suddenly reenters with the text "Sterben werd' ich um zu leben," and a perfect authentic cadence finally occurs on the downbeat of the final verse, with the entrance of the heretofore silent organ (marked volles Werk, full organ) and with the choir instructed to sing mit höchster Kraft (with highest power). The instrumental coda is in this ultimate key as well, and is accompanied by the tolling of deep bells. Mahler went so far as to purchase actual church bells for performances, finding all other means of achieving this sound unsatisfactory. Mahler wrote of this movement: "The increasing tension, working up to the final climax, is so tremendous that I don't know myself, now that it is over, how I ever came to write it."

== Text ==
Note: This text has been translated from the original German text from Des Knaben Wunderhorn to English on a very literal and line-for-line basis, without regard for the preservation of meter or rhyming patterns.

=== Fourth movement ===

Urlicht
O Röschen rot!
Der Mensch liegt in größter Not!
Der Mensch liegt in größter Pein!
Je lieber möcht' ich im Himmel sein.

Da kam ich auf einen breiten Weg:
Da kam ein Engelein und wollt' mich abweisen.
Ach nein! Ich ließ mich nicht abweisen!
Ich bin von Gott und will wieder zu Gott!
Der liebe Gott wird mir ein Lichtchen geben,
wird leuchten mir bis in das ewig selig Leben!
—Des Knaben Wunderhorn

Primeval Light
O little red rose!
Man lies in greatest need!
Man lies in greatest pain!
How I would rather be in heaven.

There came I upon a broad path
when came a little angel and wanted to turn me away.
Ah no! I would not let myself be turned away!
I am from God and shall return to God!
The loving God will grant me a little light,
Which will light me into that eternal blissful life!

=== Fifth movement ===
Note: The first eight lines were taken from the poem "Die Auferstehung" by Friedrich Gottlieb Klopstock. Mahler omitted the final four lines of this poem and wrote the rest himself (beginning at "O glaube").

Aufersteh'n, ja aufersteh'n wirst du,
mein Staub, nach kurzer Ruh'!
Unsterblich Leben! Unsterblich Leben
will der dich rief dir geben!

Wieder aufzublüh'n wirst du gesät!
Der Herr der Ernte geht
und sammelt Garben
uns ein, die starben!
—Friedrich Klopstock

O glaube, mein Herz, o glaube:
es geht dir nichts verloren!
Dein ist, ja dein, was du gesehnt,
dein, was du geliebt,
was du gestritten!

O glaube,
du warst nicht umsonst geboren!
Hast nicht umsonst gelebt,
gelitten!

Was entstanden ist,
das muss vergehen!
Was vergangen, aufersteh’n!
Hör' auf zu beben!
Bereite dich zu leben!

O Schmerz! Du Alldurchdringer!
Dir bin ich entrungen!
O Tod! Du Allbezwinger!
Nun bist du bezwungen!

Mit Flügeln, die ich mir errungen,
in heißem Liebesstreben,
werd' ich entschweben
zum Licht, zu dem kein Aug' gedrungen!

Sterben werd' ich, um zu leben!

Aufersteh'n, ja aufersteh'n wirst du
mein Herz, in einem Nu!
Was du geschlagen
zu Gott wird es dich tragen!
—Gustav Mahler

Rise again, yes, rise again,
Will you, my dust, after a brief rest!
Immortal life! Immortal life
Will he who called you, give you.

You are sown to bloom again!
The Lord of the harvest goes
And gathers sheaves,
Us, who have died.

O believe, my heart, O believe:
Nothing is lost to you!
Yours, yes yours, is what you desired
Yours, what you have loved
What you have fought for!

O believe,
You were not born for nothing!
Have not lived for nothing,
Nor suffered!

What was created
Must perish;
What perished, rise again!
Cease from trembling!
Prepare yourself to live!

O Pain, you piercer of all things,
From you, I have been wrested!
O Death, you conqueror of all things,
Now, are you conquered!

With wings which I have won for myself,
In love's fierce striving,
I shall soar upwards
To the light which no eye has penetrated!

I shall die in order to live.

Rise again, yes, rise again,
Will you, my heart, in an instant!
What you have beat,
To God shall it carry you!

== Notable premieres ==
- World premiere (first three movements only): 4 March 1895, Berlin, with the composer conducting the Berlin Philharmonic.
- World premiere (complete): 13 December 1895, Berlin, conducted by the composer.
- Belgian premiere: 6 March 1898, Liège, 'Nouveaux Concerts', conducted by Sylvain Dupuis. This was the first performance outside Germany.
- Austrian premiere: 4 June 1899, Musikverein, Vienna, with the composer conducting the Vienna Philharmonic.
- Swiss premiere: 6 June 1903, Basel Minster, Basel, with the composer conducting the Sinfonieorchester Basel.
- Dutch premiere: 26 October 1904, Concertgebouw, Amsterdam, with the composer conducting the Concertgebouw Orkest.
- United States premiere: 8 December 1908, Carnegie Hall, New York, with the composer conducting the New York Philharmonic.
- French premiere: 10 April 1910, Théâtre du Châtelet, Paris, with the composer conducting the Orchestre Colonne.

== Score ==
The original manuscript score was given by Mahler's widow to conductor Willem Mengelberg at a 1920 Mahler festival given by Mengelberg and the Concertgebouw Orchestra. It was bought from the Mengelberg Foundation in 1984 by entrepreneur Gilbert Kaplan, who specialised in conducting the symphony as an amateur.

In 2016 the manuscript was auctioned at Sotheby's of London for £4.5 million, the highest price ever attained for an auctioned musical manuscript. The buyer was subsequently revealed to have been Herbert Kloiber, an Austrian businessman and trustee of the Cleveland Orchestra, to which he subsequently donated the score. It is the only known handwritten and autographed manuscript of the work in existence. The manuscript is housed at the Cleveland Museum of Art.
