= Antonio Pappano =

English-Italian conductor and pianist

Sir Antonio Pappano CVO
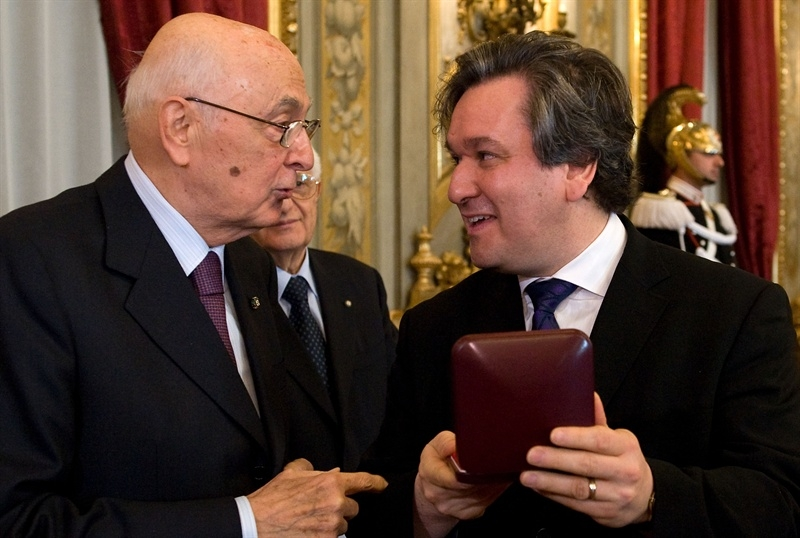
- Pappano (right) receiving the Vittorio de Sica prize from President Napolitano (2010)
- Born: 30 December 1959 (age 66); Epping, Essex, England
- Education: Royal Academy of Music, London
- Occupation: Conductor
- Known for: Conductor of Royal Opera House, and Orchestra dell'Accademia Nazionale di Santa Cecilia and London Symphony Orchestra
- Spouse: Pamela Bullock (1995–present)

Sir Antonio Pappano CVO (born 30 December 1959) is an English-Italian conductor and pianist. Between 2002 and 2024, he was the longest-serving music director of the Royal Opera House. Since 2024, he has served as chief conductor of the London Symphony Orchestra.

== Early life ==
Pappano was born in Epping, Essex. Pappano's family had relocated to England from Castelfranco in Miscano near Benevento, Italy, in 1958, and at the time of his birth his parents worked in the restaurant business. His father, Pasquale Pappano, was by vocation a singing teacher.

When Pappano was 13 years old, he moved with his family to Connecticut. After musical training in piano, composition, and conducting, he became a rehearsal accompanist at the New York City Opera at the age of 21.

== Career ==
Pappano attracted the attention of fellow pianist and conductor Daniel Barenboim, and became his assistant at the Bayreuth Festival. He worked in Barcelona and Frankfurt, and served as an assistant to Michael Gielen.

Pappano's first conducting appearance at Den Norske Opera was in 1987, and he became music director there in 1990. From 1992 to 2002, Pappano served as music director of Royal Theatre of La Monnaie Brussels, Belgium. He was principal guest conductor of the Israel Philharmonic Orchestra from 1997 to 1999. In 2005, Pappano became music director of the Orchestra dell'Accademia Nazionale di Santa Cecilia. He is scheduled to stand down from the Santa Cecilia post in 2023.

In 2002, Pappano was named the music director of the Royal Opera House (ROH) in Covent Garden, London. Pappano was the youngest conductor at the orchestra of the ROH, performing for the Royal Opera and Royal Ballet. At Covent Garden, Pappano and Kasper Holten, the ROH Director of Opera, shared responsibility for production. The ROH contract renewed Pappano's contract several times, to 2017, and then to 2023. BBC Radio broadcast in 2017 an hour-long documentary of Pappano's preparation of a new production of La bohème at the Royal Opera House. In March 2021, the ROH announced the latest extension of Pappano's contract through the 2023–2024 season, and the scheduled conclusion of Pappano's tenure at the close of the 2023–2024 season. After stepping down in June 2024, he was appointed in May 2025 as the first Conductor Laureate of the Royal Opera, a title that recognises his legacy as the longest serving music director of the Royal Opera.

Pappano had first guest-conducted the London Symphony Orchestra (LSO) in 1996. He has returned as guest conductor to the LSO on over 70 occasions, and made several recordings with the LSO. In March 2021, the LSO announced the appointment of Pappano as its next chief conductor, effective in September 2024. He held the title of chief conductor-designate in the orchestra's 2023–2024 London season.

In 2023 he directed the orchestra at the coronation of Charles III and Camilla.

== Awards and honours ==
Pappano's awards and honours include Gramophone's ‘Artist of the Year’ (2000), the 2003 Olivier Award for Outstanding Achievement in Opera, the 2004 Royal Philharmonic Society Music Award, and the Académie du Disque Lyrique's Bruno Walter prize. On 17 January 2013 he received the Incorporated Society of Musicians' Distinguished Musician Award. He was awarded the Gold Medal of the Royal Philharmonic Society in 2015.

Pappano was knighted in the 2012 New Year Honours for services to music. In 2012, he was made a Cavaliere di Gran Croce of the Republic of Italy. He was appointed Commander of the Royal Victorian Order (CVO) in the 2024 New Year Honours for services at the coronation.

At the 2024 Laurence Olivier Awards, Pappano won the Outstanding Achievement in Opera award, for his role as Music Director at the Royal Opera House.

== Personal life ==
Pappano is married to Pamela Bullock, an American vocal coach and they live in London.

== Recordings ==
Pappano records regularly for Warner Classics and is also represented on other labels.

His major recordings include:

- The Age of Puccini: with Jonas Kaufmann, tenor
- Béla Bartók: Violin Concerto No. 1, with Janine Jansen, violin, with Luigi Piovano, cello and Antonio Pappano, piano
- Arnold Bax: Tintagel
- Ludwig van Beethoven: Fidelio
- Ludwig van Beethoven: Lieder & Folk Songs, with Ian Bostridge, tenor, Vilde Frang, violin, Nicolas Altstaedt, cello and Antonio Pappano, piano
- Vincenzo Bellini: Norma
- Alban Berg: Lulu
- Hector Berlioz: Requiem, with Javier Camarena, tenor
- Hector Berlioz: Les Troyens
- Leonard Bernstein: The 3 Symphonies (No. 1; No. 2; No. 3) & Prelude, Fugue and Riffs, with Marie-Nicole Lemieux, contralto, Beatrice Rana, piano and Alessandro Carbonare, clarinet
- Georges Bizet: Carmen
- Harrison Birtwistle: The Minotaur
- Philippe Boesmans: Wintermärchen
- Johannes Brahms: Violin Concerto, with Janine Jansen, violin
- Johannes Brahms: Cello Sonata No. 1 & Cello Sonata No. 2, with Luigi Piovano, cello and Antonio Pappano, piano
- Benjamin Britten: Songs, with Ian Bostridge, tenor, Xuefei Yang, guitar and Antonio Pappano, piano
- Benjamin Britten: War Requiem, with Anna Netrebko, soprano, Ian Bostridge, tenor & Thomas Hampson, baritone
- Susan Chilcott at La Monnaie: works by Britten, Verdi, Richard Strauss & Boesmans, with Susan Chilcott, soprano and other singers
- Aaron Copland: Symphony No. 3
- Gaetano Donizetti: extracts from Anna Bolena, Maria Stuarda & Roberto Devereux, with Diana Damrau, soprano & other soloists
- Johannes Brahms: Symphony No. 4
- Antonín Dvořák: Symphony No. 9 & Cello Concerto,
- Edward Elgar: Cello Concerto, with Gautier Capuçon, cello
- Edward Elgar: Symphony No. 1 & In the South (Alassio)
- Peter Eötvös: Halleluja - Oratorium balbulum & Alle vittime senza nome, with Topi Lehtipuu, tenor, Iris Vermillion, mezzo-soprano and Matthias Brandt, actor
- Umberto Giordano: Andrea Chénier
- Han-Na Chang - Romance: works by Glazunov, Saint-Saëns, Dvořák, Tchaikovsky, Lalo & Casals
- Insieme - Opera Duets: works by Ponchielli & Giuseppe Verdi, with Jonas Kaufmann, tenor and Ludovic Tézier, baritone
- Joyce & Tony - Live at Wigmore Hall: works by Haydn, Rossini, Santoliquido, Curtis, Foster, Kern, Nelson, Dougherty, Moross, Bolcom, Villa-Lobos, Rodgers, Berlin, Arlen & Lowry, with Joyce DiDonato, soprano and Antonio Pappano, piano
- Jonas Kaufmann: Nessun Dorma - The Puccini Album, with Jonas Kaufmann, tenor and Kristine Opolais, soprano
- Edouard Lalo: Symphonie espagnole, with Maxim Vengerov, violin
- Ruggero Leoncavallo: Pagliacci
- Anatoly Liadov: The Enchanted Lake
- Liturgic Pappano: works by Rossini, Verdi & Britten
- Gustav Mahler: Symphony No. 1
- Gustav Mahler: Symphony No. 6
- Giuseppe Martucci: Romance for cello and piano, No 1 & Romance for cello and piano, No 2, with Luigi Piovano, cello and Antonio Pappano, piano
- Pietro Mascagni: Cavalleria rusticana
- Jules Massenet: Manon, Werther
- Peter Maxwell Davies: Symphony No. 10, with Markus Butter, baritone
- Felix Mendelssohn: Elijah
- Wolfgang Amadeus Mozart: Symphony No. 31
- Wolfgang Amadeus Mozart: Le nozze di Figaro
- Wolfgang Amadeus Mozart: Concert Arias, with Rolando Villazón, tenor
- Wolfgang Amadeus Mozart: Complete Violin Sonatas, with Dmitri Sitkovetsky, violin and Antonio Pappano, piano
- Modest Mussorgsky: Night on Bald Mountain
- Modest Mussorgsky: Boris Godunov
- Operatic Pappano: works by Verdi, Puccini, Rossini & Wagner
- Andrzej Panufnik: Symphony No. 10
- Giovanni Battista Pergolesi: Stabat Mater & other works, with Anna Netrebko, soprano and Marianna Pizzolato, contralto
- Pianistic Pappano: works by Arlen, Schubert, Rossini, Berlin, Shostakovich, Finzi, Quilter, Saint-Saëns, Beethoven, Mahler, Prokofiev, Britten & Wolf, with Joyce DiDonato, mezzo-soprano, Ian Bostridge, tenor, Han-na Chang, cello and Martha Argerich, piano
- Sergei Prokofiev: Piano Concerto No. 2, with Beatrice Rana, piano
- Sergei Prokofiev: Sinfonia Concertante & Cello Sonata, with Han-na Chang, cello and Antonio Pappano, conductor and piano
- Giacomo Puccini: Il trittico, La bohème, La rondine, Tosca, Madama Butterfly, Turandot, Manon Lescaut
- Giacomo Puccini: Messa di Gloria, Preludio sinfonico & Crisantemi, with Roberto Alagna, tenor and Thomas Hampson, baritone
- Sergei Rachmaninoff: Symphony No. 2
- Sergei Rachmaninoff: Piano Concerto No. 1 & Piano Concerto No. 2, with Leif Ove Andsnes, piano
- Sergei Rachmaninoff: Piano Concerto No. 3 & Piano Concerto No. 4, with Leif Ove Andsnes, piano
- Maurice Ravel: Daphnis et Chloé
- Requiem - The Pity of War: works by Butterworth, Stephan, Weill, & Mahler, with Ian Bostridge, tenor and Antonio Pappano, piano
- Maurice Ravel: Tzigane, with Maxim Vengerov, violin
- Ottorino Respighi: The Roman Trilogy (Fountains of Rome; Pines of Rome; Roman Festivals) & Il tramonto with Christine Rice, mezzo-soprano
- Nikolai Rimsky-Korsakov: Scheherazade
- Gioachino Rossini: Stabat Mater, Guillaume Tell, Messa di Gloria, Petite messe solennelle
- Gioachino Rossini: Overtures & Andante e tema con variazioni, with Carlo Tamponi, flute, Alessandro Carbonare, clarinet, Francesco Bossone, bassoon and Alessio Allegrini, horn
- Gioachino Rossini: Mélodies, with Rockwell Blake, tenor, Gérard Lesne, countertenor and Antonio Pappano, piano
- Camille Saint-Saëns: Symphony No. 3 & Carnival of the Animals, with Daniele Rossi, organ, Martha Argerich, piano & Antonio Pappano, conductor & piano
- Camille Saint-Saëns: Samson e Dalila
- Camille Saint-Saëns: Violin Concerto No. 3, with Maxim Vengerov, violin
- Franz Schubert: Schwanengesang, with Ian Bostridge, tenor & Antonio Pappano, piano
- Robert Schumann: Piano Concerto, Introduction and Allegro appasionato, Concert Allegro with Introduction and solo piano works, with Jan Lisiecki, piano
- Robert Schumann: Symphonies Nos. 2 & 4
- Richard Strauss: Ein Heldenleben & Burleske, with Bertrand Chamayou, piano
- Richard Strauss: Vier letzte Lieder & final scenes from Capriccio & Salome, with Nina Stemme, soprano & Gerhard Siegel, tenor
- Richard Strauss: Amor: Opera scenes & lieder, with Natalie Dessay, soprano, Felicity Lott, soprano, Angelika Kirchschlager, mezzo-soprano, Sophie Koch, mezzo-soprano & Thomas Allen, baritone
- Symphonic Pappano: with works by Respighi, Bernstein, Rimsky-Korsakov, Dvořák, Liadov, Tchaikovsky, Saint-Saëns, Rachmaninoff & Mahler
- Karol Szymanowski: Król Roger
- Pyotr Ilyich Tchaikovsky: Piano Concerto No. 1, with Beatrice Rana, piano
- Pyotr Ilyich Tchaikovsky: Symphonies Nos. 4-6 (No. 4; No. 5; No. 6)
- Pyotr Ilyich Tchaikovsky: Overtures & Fantasies
- Mark-Anthony Turnage: Anna Nicole
- 12 Stradivari: works by Falla, Suk, Clara Schumann, Robert Schumann, Vieuxtemps, Tchaikovsky, Szymanowski, Ravel, Elgar, Rachmaninoff, Heuberger, Kreisler & Kern written or arranged for violin and piano, with Janine Jansen, violin & Antonio Pappano, piano
- Ralph Vaughan Williams: Symphonies Nos. 4 & 6
- Ralph Vaughan Williams: Symphonies Nos. 5 & 9
- Ralph Vaughan Williams: Fantasia on a Theme by Thomas Tallis
- Giuseppe Verdi: Don Carlo, Il trovatore, Aida, Otello, Rigoletto, I due Foscari, Macbeth
- Giuseppe Verdi: Messa da Requiem, Quattro Pezzi Sacri, Ave Maria (1880), with Maria Agresta, soprano
- Verismo: works by Cilea, Giordano, Puccini, Leoncavallo, Catalani, Arrigo Boito & Ponchielli, with Anna Netrebko, soprano
- Richard Wagner: Tristan und Isolde, Die Walküre, Parsifal
- Richard Wagner: Love Duets, with Plácido Domingo, tenor & Deborah Voigt, soprano
- Richard Wagner: Scenes from The Ring, with Plácido Domingo, tenor & other soloists
- George Walker: Symphony No. 5
- William Walton: Cello Concerto, with Gautier Capuçon, cello
- While I Dream: works by Liszt & Schumann, with Barbara Bonney, soprano and Antonio Pappano, piano
- Hugo Wolf: Lieder, with Ian Bostridge, tenor

== Television ==
Pappano has presented for the BBC including:

- Opera Italia (BBC, 2010) – a three-part series tracing the history of Italian opera. The first episode covers the beginnings of opera, from Monteverdi to Rossini, plus discussing Handel and Mozart who were pivotal in the development of the art form. The second episode examines six of Verdi's most famous works – Nabucco, Rigoletto, Don Carlo, Otello, Falstaff and La Traviata. The third episode covers five of Puccini's most popular operas – La Boheme, Tosca, Madame Butterfly, Gianni Schicchi and Turandot.
- Pappano's Classical Voices (BBC, 2015), a four-part series exploring the great roles and the greatest singers of the last 100 years through the prism of the main classical voice types – soprano, tenor, mezzo-soprano, baritone and bass.

== Sources ==
Maeckelbergh, Lucrèce, Antonio Pappano: Con Passione. Snoeck, 2006. ISBN 90-5349-527-4.

Cultural offices
Preceded by Sylvain Cambreling	Music Director, Théâtre de la Monnaie, Brussels; 1992–2002	Succeeded by Kazushi Ōno
Preceded by Bernard Haitink	Music Director, Royal Opera House, Covent Garden; 2002–2024	Succeeded by Jakub Hrusa
