= List of compositions by Mauricio Kagel =

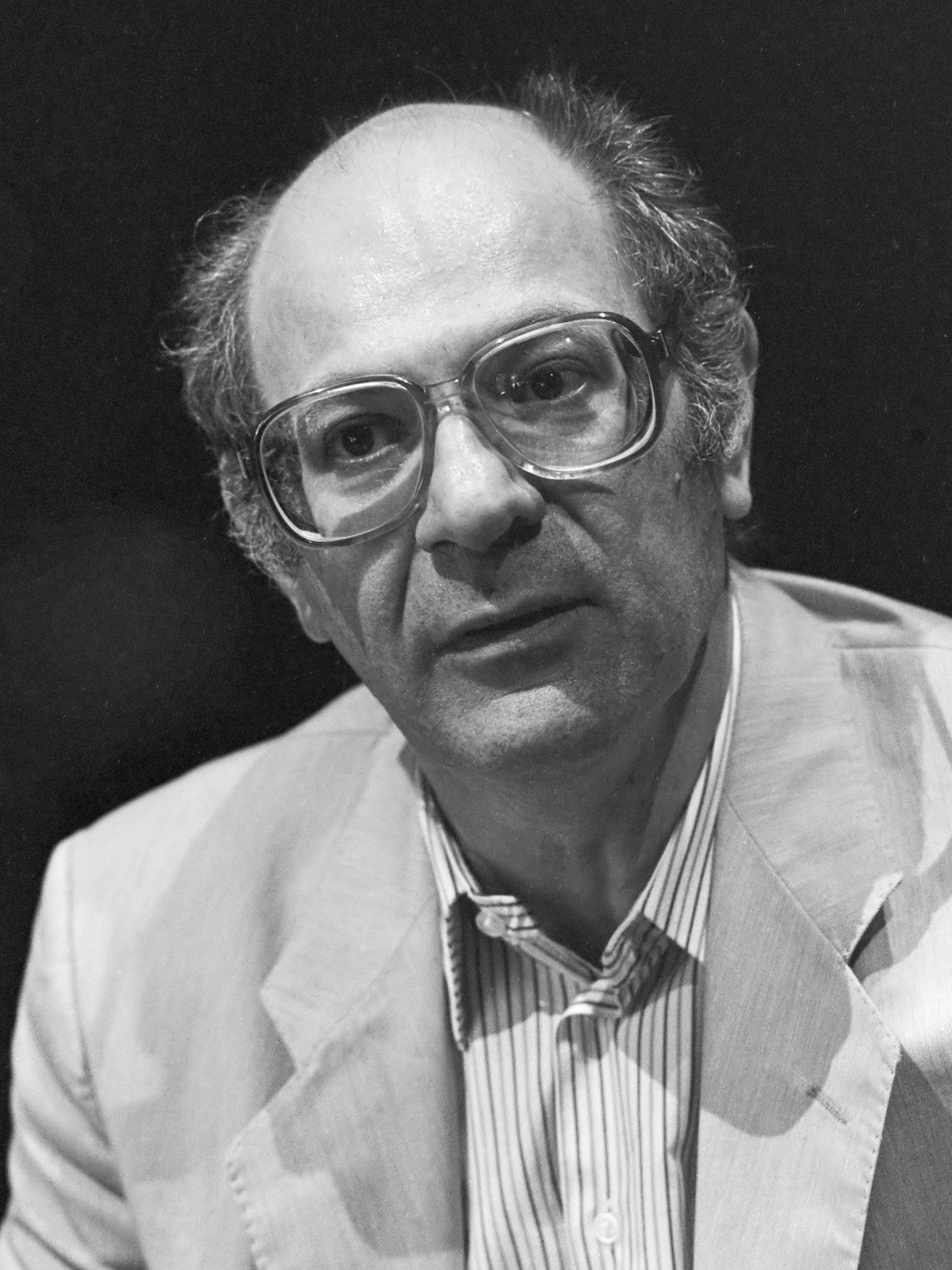
Mauricio Kagel in 1985

This is a list of compositions by Mauricio Kagel. Sources:

== Chronological ==
1950

- Palimpsestos for mixed choir a capella

1952

- Two Pieces for Orchestra
- Variations for mixed quartet (fl, cl, vln, vc)

1953

- Sextet (fl, cl, bcl, vln, vIa, vc); revised 1957 as String Sextet (2 vln, 2 vla, 2 vc)

1954

- Música para la torre ('Music for the Tower'); in four parts: 1) For Orchestra [the Two Pieces from 1952], 2) Study for Percussion, 3) Ostinato for Chamber Ensemble, 4) ensayo de musica concreta (Essay in musique concrète)
- Muertos de Buenos Aires, music for the film of the same title by Alejandro Sanderman
- Cinco cantos de Génesis for voice and piano
- Four Pieces for piano

1955

- Drei Klangstudien ('Three Studies in Sound')
- Ocho motetes apócrifos for mixed choir

1956

- De ruina mundis: Cantata for voice and instruments
- Aforismos de Apollinaire for clarinet and piano
- Prelude No. 1 for bandoneon
- Cuatro piezas breves for strings
- Elegía para clarinete solo for clarinet solo

1958

- Anagrama for vocal soloists, speaking choir and chamber ensemble

1959

- Transición II for piano, percussion and two tape recorders

1960

- Transición I for electronic sounds
- Sur scène: Chamber music theatre piece
- Sonant (1960/...) for guitar, double bass, harp, and skin instruments
- Pandorasbox (Bandoneonpiece) for bandoneon
- Journal de théâtre: Collection of situations for instruments, actors and props; later to comprise 'Pas de cinq' (1965), 'Camera oscura' (1965), 'Die Himmelsmechanik' (1965), 'Variaktionen' (1967) and 'Kommentar und Extempore' (1967)
- Le Bruit: Invection pour toute sorte de sources sonores et expressions injurieuses (unpublished, unperformed)

1961

- Mimetics (Metapiece) for piano; a) for solo piano, b) interrupted by other compositions, c) as Metapiece (Mimetics), simultaneous with other compositions by Kagel or other composers
- Heterophonie for orchestra

1962

- Improvisation ajoutée for organ; rev. 1968
- Antithese; a) Music for electronic and public sounds; b) Play for one actor with electronic and public sounds

1964

- Phonophonie: Four melodramas for two voices and other sound sources; rev. 1965; radiophonic version 1965
- Die Frauen ('The Women'): Theatrical piece for ladies for voices and instruments (unpublished, unperformed)
- Prima vista for slide pictures and indeterminate number of sound sources
- Diaphonie Nos 1-3 for choir and/or orchestra and slide projectors
- Match for three players
- Composition und Decomposition: A reading piece

1965

- Tremens; a) Scenic montage of a test for two actors, electric instruments, percussion, tapes and slide projection; b) Variaktionen über Tremens: Scenic montage of a test for two actors, tapes and slide projection; c) Musik aus Tremens [instrumental version with tapes ad lib]
- 'Pas de cinq': Walking scene for five actors; part of Journal de théâtre (1960)
- 'Die Himmelsmechanik' ('The Mechanism of the Sky'): Composition with stage décors; part of Journal de théâtre (1960)
- 'Camera oscura': Chromatic play for light sources and actors; part of Journal de théâtre (1960)
- Mirum for tuba

1966

- Music for renaissance instruments for 23 players; alt. Chamber Music for Renaissance Instruments for 2-22 players

1967

- String Quartet I/II
- 'Kommentar und Extempore' ('Commentary and Extempore'): Monologues with gestures; part of Journal de théâtre (1960)
- 'Variaktionen' ('Vari-actions') for singers and actors; part of Journal de théâtre (1960)
- Fantasy for organ with obbligati
- Montage for various sound sources [combination of several of Kagel's instrumental compositions]; Montage à titre de spectacle [version with theatrical works]

1968

- Hallelujah for voices
- Der Schall ('Sound') for five players
- Privat for lonely listener
- Ornithologica multiplicata for exotic and indigenous birds

1969

- Synchronstudie ('Study in Synchronicity') for singer, Foley artists and film projection
- Unter Strom ('Under Current') for three players
- (Hörspiel) Ein Aufnahmezustand (1. Dosis) ('(Radio Play) A State of Recording (first dose)')

1970

- Ludwig van: Homage by Beethoven
- Acustica: Music for experimental sound producers, loudspeakers and two to five players
- Klangwehr ('Sound Defence') for marching music corps
- Tactil for three
- Atem ('Breath') for one wind player
- Staatstheater: Scenic composition; constituents:

'Répertoire': Theatrical concert piece
'Einspielungen' ('Recordings'): Music for loudspeakers
'Ensemble' for 16 voices
'Debüt' for 60 voices
'Saison' ('Season'): Singspiel in 65 scenes
'Spielplan' ('Programme'): Instrumental music in action
'Kontra → Danse': Ballet for non-dancers
'Freifahrt' ('Free Ride'): Gliding chamber music
'Parkett' ('Stalls'): Concert mass scenes

1971

- (Hörspiel) Ein Aufnahmezustand (2. und 3. Dosis)
- Probe ('Rehearsal') for an improvised collective; radiophonic version 1972
- Morceau de concours for one or two trumpeters; rev. 1992
- Guten Morgen! ('Good morning!'): radio play consisting of advertisements

1972

- Programm: conversations with chamber music; sections:

'Abend' ('Evening') for vocal double quartet, trombone quintet, electric organ and piano
'Aus Zungen Stimmen' ('From Tongues Voices') for accordion quintet
'Charakterstück' ('Character Piece') for zither quartet
'Gegenstimmen' ('Countervoices') for mixed choir and obligatory harpsichord
'General Baß for continuing instrumental sounds
'Die Mutation' ('The Mutation') for men's (and/or boys') voices and obligatory piano
'Musi' for plucking orchestra
'Recitativarie' for singing harpsichordist
'Siegfriedp' for violoncello
'Unguis incarnatus est' for piano and...[bass instrument]
'Vom Hörensagen' ('Hearsay') for women's (and/or girls') choir and obligatory harmonium

- Exotica for extra-European instruments
- Con Voce for three mute players
- Variationen ohne Fuge ('Variations without Fugue') for large orchestra on Variations and Fugue on a Theme by Handel for piano Op. 24 by Johannes Brahms (1861/62)

1973

- 1898 for children's voices and instruments; rev. 1996
- Zwei-Mann-Orchester ('Two-Man-Orchestra') for two one-man-orchestras

1975

- Soundtrack: A filmic radio play
- Mare nostrum: Discovery, pacification and conversion of the Mediterranean region by a tribe from Amazonia [music theatre]
- Kantrimiusik: Pastoral for voices and instruments

1976

- Bestiarium: Acoustic fables on two stages
- Zählen und Erzählen ('Counting and Recounting') for non-grownups [music theatre by children]
- Die Umkehrung Amerikas ('The Reversal of America'): Epic radio play
- MM 51: A piece of film music for piano

1977

- An Tasten ('On Keys'): Piano etude
- Quatre degrés ('Four Stages'); sections:

'Dressur' ('Dressage'): Percussion trio for wooden instruments
'Présentation' for two
'Déménagement' ('Removal'): Silent play for stage workers
'Variété': Concert show for artistes and musicians

1978

- Tango Alemán for voice, violin, bandoneon, and piano
- Ex-Position; constituents:

'Die Rhythmusmaschinen' ('The Rhythm Machines'): Action for gymnasts, drum machines, and percussionists
'Chorbuch' ('Choir Book') for vocal ensemble and keyboard instruments

- 'Zehn Marsche, um den Sieg zu verfehlen' ('Ten Marches to Miss the Victory') for winds and percussion; from Der Tribun (1979)
- Die Erschöpfung der Welt: Theatrical illusion in one act

1979

- Blue's Blue: An ethnomusicological reconstruction for four players
- Klangwölfe ('Sound Wolves') for violin and piano
- Der Tribun ('The Tribune'): Radio play for a political orator, marching sounds and loudspeakers
- Vox Humana? Cantata for solo loudspeaker, women's voices and orchestra
- Aus Deutschland: lieder opera

1981

- Mitternachtsstük for voices and instruments on fragments from the diaries of Robert Schumann (1828); fourth movement added in 1986
- Finale with chamber ensemble

1982

- Rrrrrrr...

a) A radio fantasy (with 41 pieces):

11 pieces for winds, double basses and percussion: 'Raccontando', 'Rauschpfeifen', 'Rejdovák', 'Register', 'Réjouissance', 'Reprisen', 'Reveille/Retraite', 'Rhapsodie', 'Rheinländer', 'Ritornell l ', 'Ritornell 2'
Seven pieces for mixed choir (piano ad lib): 'Rrrrrrr...', 'Requiem', 'Resurrexit dominus', 'Rêverie', 'Rex tremendae', 'Romance', 'Ring Shouts'
Eight pieces for organ: 'Râga', 'Rauschpfeifen', 'Repercussa', 'Ragtime-Waltz', 'Rondeña', 'Ripieno', 'Rosalie', 'Rossignols enrhumés
Six pieces for two percussionists: 'Railroad Drama', 'Ranz des vaches', 'Rigaudon', 'Rim Shots & Co.', 'Ruf', 'Rutscher'
Four pieces for solo voice with piano accompaniment: 'Railroad Song', 'Rappresentatione sacra', 'Revolution Speech', 'Rural Blue'
Five pieces for jazz ensemble: 'Rackett', 'Rrrrrrre-bop', 'Reeds', 'Rhythm-Bone & Brush', 'Riff'

b) Radio play on 'A radio fantasy' for one speaker (1982)

- Fürst Igor, Strawinsky ('Prince Igor, Stravinsky') for bass voice and instruments
- Fragen: Hörspot ('Questions: Listening Slot')
- Szenario for strings and tape

1983

- Intermezzo for voices and chamber ensemble
- La trahison orale ('Oral treason'): A musical epic on the devil; radiophonic version 1987
- Two Ballads by Guillaume de Machaut; instrumental realization by Mauricio Kagel

1984

- Der Eid des Hippokrates ('Hippocrates' Oath') for piano three-hands
- ...nach einer Lektüre von Orwell ('...upon Reading Orwell'): Radio play in Germanic meta-language

1985

- Pan for piccolo and string quartet
- Saint Bach's Passion for solo voices, choirs and large orchestra
- Cäcilia: Ausgeplündert, ein Besuch bei der Heiligen ('Cecilia: looted, Visit at the Saint'); Radio play
- Trio in Three Movements for violin, violoncello and piano
- Mio caro Luciano: Tape collage

1986

- Aus dem Nachlaß ('From the Estate'): Pieces for viola, violoncello, and double bass
- Ein Brief ('A Letter'): Concert scene for mezzo and orchestra
- Old/New: Study for solo trumpet

1987

- Ce-A-Ge-E for piano and harmonizer
- For Us: Happy Birthday to You!; a) for four violoncellos; b) arranged for picc (doubling alto fl), cl, vla, db, mandoline, gt, hp, perc (1990)
- Third String Quartet in four movements
- Tantz-Schul: Ballet d'action; also version as Suite for Orchestra

1988

- Quodlibet for female voice and orchestra on French chanson lyrics from the fifteenth century

1989

- Music for keyboard instruments and orchestra
- Phantasiestück; a) for flute and piano; b) for flute and piano with accompaniment
- 'Osten' ('East); from Die Stücke der Windrose for salon orchestra
- 'Süden' ('South'); from Die Stücke der Windrose for salon orchestra
- Fragende Ode ('Questioning Ode') for double choir, brass and percussion
- Zwei Akte; a) Grand Duo for saxophone and harp; b) for two actors, saxophone and harp
- Les idées fixes: Rondo for orchestra

1990

- Liturgien for solo voices, double choir, and large orchestra
- 'Nordosten' ('North-east); from Die Stücke der Windrose for salon orchestra
- Opus 1991: Concert piece for orchestra

1991

- "...den 24. xii. 1931": Garbled news for baritone and instruments
- 'Nordwesten' ('North-west'); from Die Stücke der Windrose for salon orchestra
- 'Südosten' ('South-east); from Die Stücke der Windrose for salon orchestra

1992

- Konzertstück for tympani and orchestra
- Étude No. 1 for large orchestra

1993

- Passé composé: KlavieRhapsodie ('piano rhapsody')
- Episoden, Figuren: Solo for accordion
- Fanfanfaren for four trumpets
- Melodien for carillon
- Fourth string quartet in three movements
- 'Südwesten' ('South-west'); from Die Stücke der Windrose for salon orchestra

1994

- Nah und Fern ('Near and Far'): Acoustic listening piece for bells and trumpets with background
- 'Westen' ('West'); from Die Stücke der Windrose for salon orchestra
- 'Norden' ('North'); from Die Stücke der Windrose for salon orchestra
- Interview avec D. pour Monsieur Croche et orchestre; texts by Claude Debussy

1995

- Serenade for three players
- Schattenklänge ('Shadow Sounds'): Three pieces for bass clarinet
- L'art bruit: Solo for two
- À deux mains: Impromptu for piano

1996

- Études Nos 2–3 for large orchestra
- Orchestrion-Straat for chamber ensemble
- Auftakte, sechshändig ('Upbeats, six-hands') for piano and two percussionists; version for two pianos and two percussionists: Auftakte, achthändig (2003)
- Eine Brise ('A Breeze'): Fleeting action for 111 cyclists. Musically enriched sport event in the open

1997

- Ragtime à trois for violin, violoncello and piano
- Playback Play: News from the music fair; radio play
- Orgelmusik zu vier Händen ('Organ Music for four hands')

1998

- Duodramen for voices and orchestra
- Impromptu No. 2 for piano

1999

- Semikolon: Action with bass drum
- Schwarzes Madrigal ('Black Madrigal') for voices and instruments
- Entführung im Konzertsaal ('Abduction in the Concert Hall'): Musical report of an incident

2000

- Burleske for baritone saxophone and choir

2001

- Quirinus' Liebeskuss for vocal ensemble and instruments
- Broken Chords for large orchestra
- Second Trio in One Movement for violin, violoncello and piano
- Double Sextet for ensemble

2002

- Das Konzert for solo flute, harp, percussion and strings
- Der Turm zu Babel ('The Tower of Babel'): Melodies for solo voice

2003

- Andere Gesänge ('Other Chants'): Intermezzi for soprano et pour l'orchestre

2004

- Magic Flutes: Perpetual Canon Interrupted for 12
- Vorzeitiger Schlußverkauf Unvollendete Memoiren eines Toningenieurs ('Premature Sale: Unfinished Memoirs of a Sound Engineer'); radio play
- Motetten for eight violoncellos

2005

- Fremde Töne und Widerhall ('Foreign Notes and Echo') for orchestra
- Capriccio for two pianos
- Fünf Vokalisen for a countertenor

2006

- L'Invention d'Adolphe Sax for saxophone quartet and chamber choir
- Divertimento? Farce for ensemble
- Fifth string quartet in two movements

2007

- Quasi niente for closed mouths
- Verborgene Reime for choir and percussion

2008

- In der Matratzengruft for tenor solo and ensemble

== By genre ==
=== Stage works ===
- Camera obscura chromatic play for light sources with performers (1965)
- Staatstheater (1967/70)
- Mare nostrum, Scenic Play for countertenor, baritone, flute, oboe, guitar, harp, cello and percussion (1975)
- Kantrimiusik, pastorale for voices and instruments (1975)
- Music-Epic about the Devil "La trahison orale" (1983)

=== For orchestra ===
- Dos piezas for orchestra (1952)
- Heterophonie for orchestra (1959–61)
- Zehn Märsche, um den Sieg zu verfehlen (Ten marches in order to miss victory), for brass orchestra (1979)
- Les idées fixes, rondo for orchestra (1988/89)
- Opus 1.991 for orchestra (1990)
- Konzertstück (Concert piece), for timpani and orchestra (1990–92)
- Études for orchestra (I 1992, II 1995/96, III 1996)
- Fremde Töne & Widerhall (Strange sounds and echo), for orchestra (2005)

=== Chamber music ===
- String Sextet (1953–57)
- Transición II for piano, percussion, and two tapes (1958–59)
- Sonant for guitar, harp, contrabass, and skin instruments (1960)
- Improvisation ajoutée for organist and 2–3 "registrants" (1961–62)
- Match for three players (two celli and percussionist-umpire) (1964)
- Musik für Renaissance-Instrumente, for two up to twenty-two instruments (1965–66)
- String Quartets Nos. 1 and 2 (1965–67)
- Der Schall for five players performing on 54 plucked-string, percussion, and wind instruments (1968)
- Acustica for experimental sound-producers and loud-speakers (1968–70)
- Atem for a wind instrument (1969–70)
- Morceau de concours for 1 or 2 trumpets (1968–72)
- 1898 for children's voices and instruments (1972–73)
- Dressur, trio for wood percussion (1977)
- Rrrrrrr...: 5 Jazzstucke for clarinet, bass clarinet, alto saxophone, violin and piano (1981–1982)
- Rrrrrrr..., six duos for two percussionists (1982)
- Pan a tutti i Papagheni, for piccolo and string quartet (1985)
- Piano Trio No. 1 (1985)
- String Quartet No. 3 (1986)
- Aus dem Nachlass, pieces for viola, cello, and contrabass (1986)
- Zwei Akte grand duo for sopranino, alto, baritone saxophones and harp (1988–89)
- Phantasiestück for flute and piano (1989)
- ..., den 24.XII.1931 mutilated news for baritone and instruments (1991)
- String Quartet No. 4 (1993)
- Schattenklänge, three pieces for bass clarinet (1995) [14']
- Art bruit for a percussionist and an assistant (1994/95)
- Piano Trio No. 2 (2001)

=== Vocal works ===
- Blue's Blue, for voice and glass trumpet, E-flat clarinet and alto saxophone, acoustic guitar and violin (1978–79)
- Fürst Igor – Strawinsky, a requiem for Igor Strawinsky for bass and instruments (1982)
- Sankt-Bach-Passion for soloists, choirs and orchestra (premiered in 1985)
- Ein Brief for mezzo soprano and orchestra (1985–86)
- Mitternachtsstük for voices and instruments on four fragments from the diary of Robert Schumann (1980–81/86)
- Schwarzes Madrigal (Black madrigal), for choir, trumpet, tuba and 2 percussionists (1998/99)
- In der Matratzengruft for tenor and ensemble (2008)

=== Film ===
- Antithese (1965)
- Match (1966)
- Solo (1967)
- Duo (1968)
- Hallelujah (1969)
- Ludwig van (1970)
- Tactil (1971)
- Zwei-Mann-Orchester (1973)
- Unter Strom (1975)
- Kantrimiusik (1976)
- Phonophonie (1979)
- Blue's Blue (1981)
- MM 51 (1983)
- Szenario: Un chien andalou (1982)
- Er: Television play on A Radio Fantasy (1984)
- Dressur (1985)
- Mitternachtsstük (1987)
- Répertoire (1989)
- Bestiarium (2000)
