= Introduction and Allegro =

Introduction and Allegro may refer to:

- Introduction and Allegro (Elgar)
- Introduction and Allegro (Ravel)
- Introduction and Allegro appassionato (Schumann)
- Introduction and Concert Allegro (Schumann)
- Introduction and Allegro appassionato (Reinecke)
