= Concert piece =

Short musical work in one movement for a soloist and orchestra

A concert piece (German: Konzertstück; French: pièce de concert, also morceau de concert) is a musical composition, in most cases in one movement, intended for performance in a concert. Usually it is written for one or more virtuoso instrumental soloists and orchestral or piano accompaniment.

In some cases concert pieces start with a separate opening movement, or are otherwise in more than one movement or section. A piece that presents itself as a miniature concerto is rather called concertino than concert piece, although in German several such concertinos are known as Konzertstücke. For instance Siegfried Wagner's Flute Concertino was published as Konzertstück for flute and small orchestra. Incomplete concerto movements by Beethoven and Schubert were retroactively designated as concert pieces. Schumann's 1841 Fantasia for piano and orchestra, in form similar to Weber's Konzertstück, was later rewritten and expanded with two further movements into his Piano Concerto Op. 54. When the soloist is a vocalist, the piece rather belongs to the concert aria genre. Some concert pieces are written for instrumental soloists exclusively, while also concert pieces for orchestra without soloist exist. In this sense as well Chopin's Allegro de concert for solo piano as Tchaikovsky's Romeo and Juliet for orchestra can be called concert pieces. A concert overture is an overture which is conceived as a stand-alone concert piece.

== Examples ==
- Arnold Bax: Concert Piece for Viola and Piano
- Ludwig van Beethoven:
  - Konzertstück for violin and orchestra (a.k.a. Violin Concerto movement) in C major, WoO 5 (fragment)
  - Rondo for piano and orchestra in B-flat major, WoO 6
- Franz Berwald: Konzertstück for Bassoon and Orchestra, Op. 2
- Max Bruch: Konzertstück for Violin and Orchestra, in two movements, Op. 84
- Ferruccio Busoni: Concert Piece for piano and orchestra, BV 236 (Op. 31a)
- Cécile Chaminade: Konzertstück for piano and orchestra, Op. 40
- Hugo Distler: Konzertstück for piano and orchestra, Op. post.
- George Enescu: Konzertstück for Viola and Piano
- Carl Filtsch: Konzertstück for piano and orchestra
- Friedrich Grützmacher: Two Pièces de concert for cello and piano, Op. 32
- Paul Hindemith:
  - Konzertstück (also known as Concertino) for Trautonium (or clarinet) and strings
  - Konzertstück for two alto saxophones
- Mauricio Kagel:
  - Konzertstück for timpani and orchestra
  - Opus 1.991 — Concert piece for orchestra
- Felix Mendelssohn: Concert Pieces in F minor (Op. 113) and in D minor (Op. 114) for clarinet, basset horn and piano (or orchestra).
- Carl Reinecke: Konzertstück for piano and orchestra, Op. 33
- Camille Saint-Saëns:
  - Morceau de concert for violin and orchestra in E minor, Op. 62
  - Morceau de concert for horn and orchestra in F minor, Op. 94
  - Morceau de concert for harp and orchestra in G major, Op. 154
- Franz Schubert:
  - Concert Piece for violin and orchestra in D major, D 345
  - Rondo for violin and string orchestra in A major, D 438
  - Polonaise for violin and orchestra in B♭ major, D 580
- Robert Schumann:
  - Konzertstück for Four Horns and Orchestra, Op. 86
  - Introduction and Allegro appassionato for piano and orchestra, Op. 92
  - Concert Allegro with Introduction for piano and orchestra, Op. 134
- Charles Villiers Stanford: Concert Piece for Organ and Orchestra, Op. 181
- Carl Maria von Weber: Konzertstück in F minor for Piano and Orchestra, Op. 79, J. 282
