= Amel Brahim-Djelloul =

French opera singer

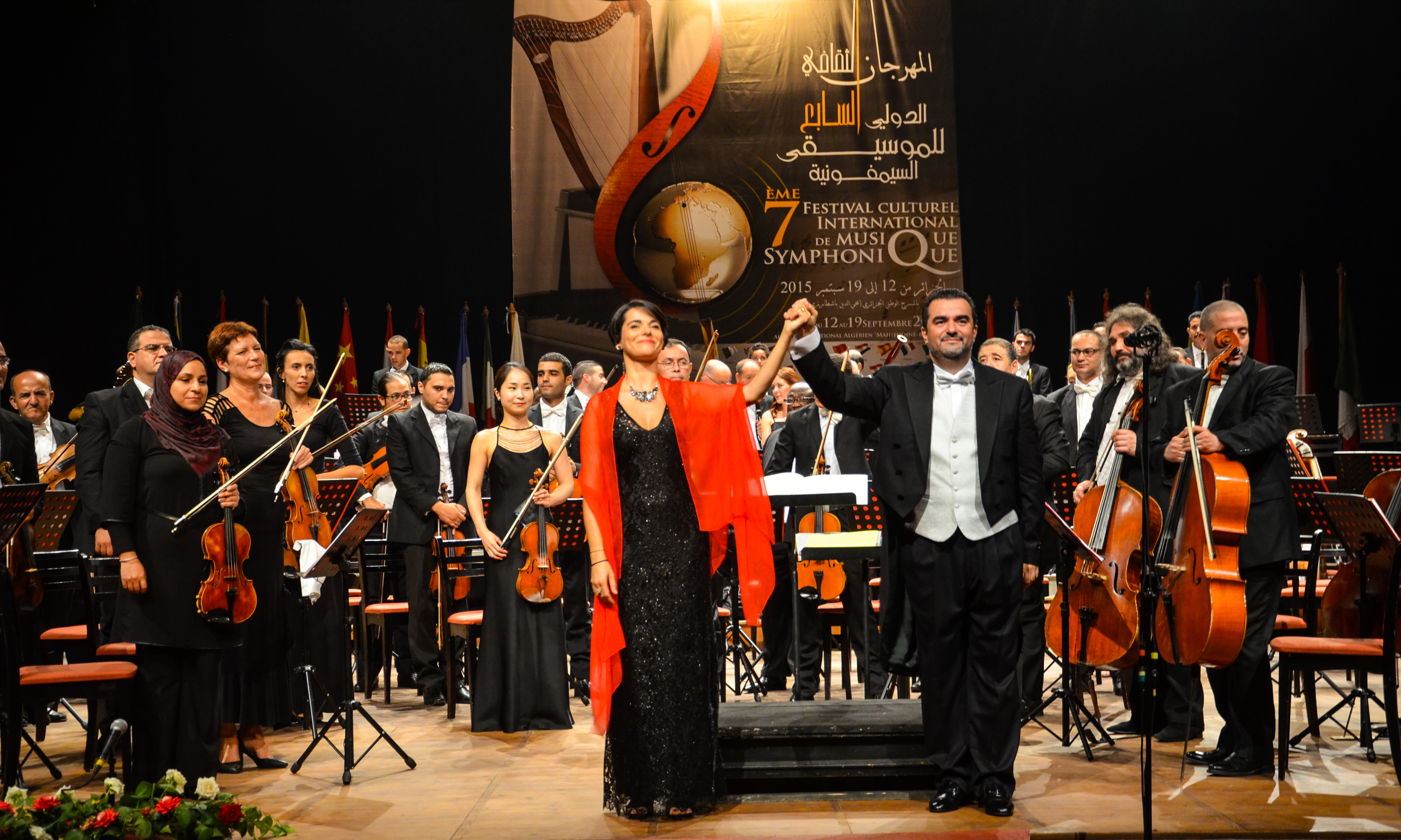

Background information
- Born: 1975 (age 50–51)
- Origin: Algiers, Algeria
- Genres: Opera
- Occupation: Opera singer (soprano)
- Website: Website

Amel Brahim-Djelloul (born 1975) is an Algerian soprano opera singer and concert recitalist.

== Biography ==
Considered one of the most promising singers of her generation, Amel Brahim-Djelloul started her musical studies with the violin. She began studying singing in 1995 in Algiers under the tuition of Abdelhamid Belferouni. It was Noelle Barker who advised her to go to Paris to finish her training, and she studied at the Ecole Nationale de Musique at Montreuil with Frantz Petri and then at the Conservatoire National Supérieur de Musique in Paris with Peggy Bouveret and Malcolm Walker, with whom she has since been working. She graduated from the Conservatoire in June 2003.

Amel Brahim-Djelloul began very early to tackle the key roles in her repertoire. In 2002 she sang Dido in Purcell's opera under Stephen Stubb, and went on to make her debut in the role of Pamina with the Orchestre National d'Ile de France with Alain Altinoglu conducting. René Jacobs noticed her and invited her to take part in a new production of Sartorio's Giulio Cesare at the Innsbruck Ancient Music Festival, conducted by Attilio Cremonesi. He then gave her the roles of Valletto and Amore in a new production of The Coronation of Poppea which he conducted at the Théâtre des Champs-Elysées, then at the Deutsche Oper in Berlin, and at the Opéra de la Monnaie in Brussels in a production by David McVicar.

Amel Brahim-Djelloul later took part in William Christie's Jardin des Voix with whom she appeared on the most renowned stages in the world including the Cité de la Musique in Paris, the Barbican in London, the Grand Théâtre of Geneva, the Grand Auditorium in Madrid, and the Lincoln Center in New York. Having attracted attention during this tour, she was then invited to sing in Handel's Messiah with the National Symphony Orchestra of Washington. She made her debut at the Festival International d'Art Lyrique at Aix-en-Provence in July 2005 in the role of Servilia in a new production of La clemenza di Tito.

Her career has since been involved with such roles as Susanna in The Marriage of Figaro at the opera of Angers-Nantes and then Lausanne, Despina in Così fan tutte at Nice, Adina in L'elisir d'amore at Avignon and the title role in Messager's Véronique at the Paris Châtelet. She has also been heard in The Coronation of Poppea at the Grand Théâtre of Geneva and in the new production of Pelléas et Mélisande, conducted by Bernard Haitink at the Théâtre des Champs-Elysées.

Amel Brahim-Djelloul appears regularly in recitals with Claude Lavoix, Anne le Bozec and Anne-Céline Barrère, for instance in April 2006 at Lille Opera and in June 2006 at the Saint-Denis Festival.

== Opera ==
- Adina (L'elisir d'amore - Donizetti)
- Mélisande, Yniold (Pelléas et Mélisande - Debussy)
- Antigone (Oedipe - Enesco)
- Véronique (Véronique - Messager)
- Valletto/Amore (L'incoronazione di Poppea - Monteverdi)
- Despina (Così fan tutte - Mozart)
- Pamina (Die Zauberflöte - Mozart)
- Servilia (La clemenza di Tito - Mozart)
- Susanna / Barbarina (Le nozze di Figaro - Mozart)
- Dido (Dido and Aeneas - Purcell)
- Divers (The Fairy Queen - Purcell)
- Sesto (Giulio Cesare in Egitto - Sartorio)
- Nanetta (Falstaff - Verdi)

== Records ==
- 2008 - : Amel chante la méditerranée - Souvenirs d'Al-Andalous (Ame Son)- Amel Brahim-Djelloul (soprano) / Rachid Brahim-Djelloul (Violin, Singing and direction) / Ensemble Amedyez : Rachid Brahim-Djelloul (Violon, Chant et direction), Noureddine Aliane (Ud), Dahmane Khalfa (Derbouka and Percussions), Sofia Djemai (Mandoline) et Mohammed Maakni (Guitar).
- 2007 - : Les milles et une nuits (Ame Son) - Amel Brahim-Djelloul (soprano) / Anne-Le Bozec (piano) - Rewards : 4f Télérama - 4 stars Le Monde de la musique - 5 Diapasons - 5 clés de sol by Opéra Magazine - songs by Francesco Santoliquido and others.
- 2006 - : Le Jardin des Voix (Virgin Classics) - Les Arts Florissants / William Christie
- 2006 - : Giulio Cesare in Egitto (ORF Alte Musik) - 4 acte Opera of Antonio Sartorio (1630–1680) - Amel Brahim-Djelloul (Sesto)
- 2005 - : Les Grands Motets de Charpentier (K617) - Conductor: Olivier Schneebeli / Amel Brahim-Djelloul, Robert Getchell, Jean-François Lombard, Jean-François Novelli, Stephan van Dick, Maarten Koningsberger, Edwin Crossley-Mercer, Ens. voc. Les Pages et Chantres du Centre de Musique Baroque de Versailles, Ens. Musica Florea.
- 2004 - : Les Grands Motets de Lully (K617) - Conductor: Olivier Schneebeli / Amel Brahim-Djelloul (soprano), Damien Guillon (alto), Howard Crook (ténor), Hervé Lamy (ténor), Arnaud Marzorati (basse), Ens. voc. Les Pages et Chantres du Centre de Musique Baroque de Versailles, Ens. inst. Musica Florea.
