= Maria de Alvear =

Spanish-German composer

Maria de Alvear (born 1960 in Madrid, Spain) is a Spanish-German composer living in Germany who was born to a Spanish father and German mother. She studied with Mauricio Kagel at the Hochschule für Musik und Tanz Köln, completing a course in new music theatre in 1986.
