= String Sextet (Kagel) =

1953 composition by Mauricio Kagel

Mauricio Kagel composed his String Sextet, his second published chamber music work, in 1953 at the age of 21. It was revised in 1957, just after he moved from Buenos Aires, Argentina to Cologne, West Germany; the following year saw its premiere in the Darmstadt Summer Courses for New Music. It is a short (c. 7 minutes) single-movement serial composition which has been described as dealing with the implications of the collision and co-existence of structures within the music.
