= Piano Concerto (Schumann) =

Romantic concerto by Robert Schumann

- by Robert Schumann
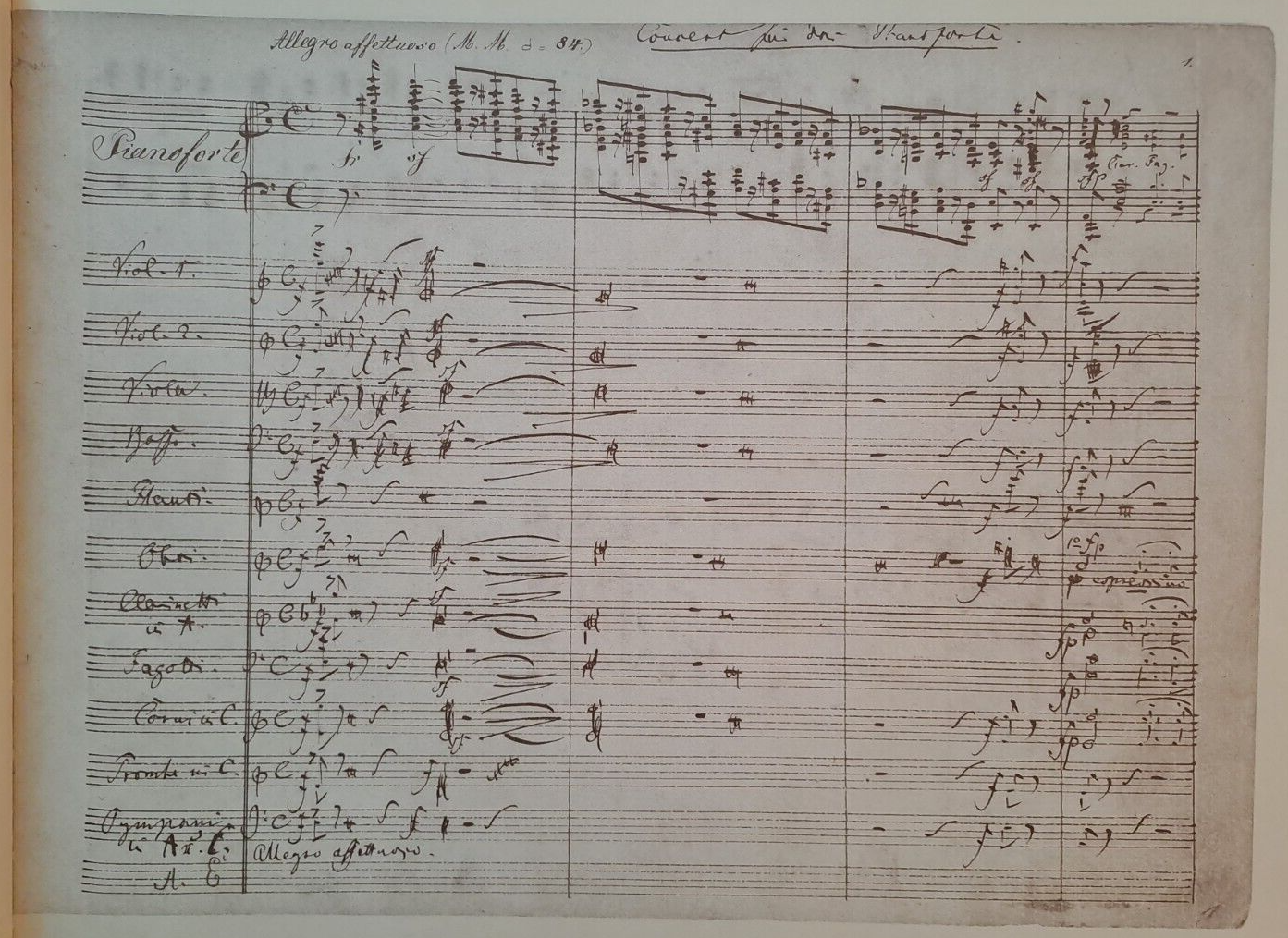
- Facsimile of the autograph manuscript (first bars)
- Key: A minor
- Opus: 54
- Period: Romantic
- Composed: 1841
- Movements: 3

Premiere
- Date: 4 December 1845
- Location: Dresden

The Piano Concerto in A minor, Op. 54, by the German Romantic composer Robert Schumann was completed in 1845 and is the composer's only piano concerto. The complete work premiered in Dresden on 4 December 1845. It is one of the most widely performed and recorded piano concertos from the Romantic period.

The autograph manuscript of the concerto is preserved in the Heinrich Heine Institute in Düsseldorf.

== History ==
Schumann had worked on several piano concertos earlier. He began one in E♭ major in 1828, from 1829–31 he worked on one in F major, and in 1839 he wrote one movement of a concerto in D minor. None of these were completed.

On 10 January 1833, Schumann first expressed the idea of writing a Piano Concerto in A minor. In a letter to his future father-in-law, Friedrich Wieck, he wrote: "I think the piano concerto must be in C major or in A minor." On 17–20 May 1841, Schumann wrote a fantasy for piano and orchestra, his Phantasie in A minor. He unsuccessfully tried to sell it to publishers. In August 1841 and January 1843 Schumann revised the piece, but was unsuccessful. His wife Clara, an accomplished pianist, then urged him to expand it into a full piano concerto. In 1845 he added the Intermezzo and Allegro vivace to the work. It remained the only piano concerto he finished.

The premiere of the first movement (Phantasie) took place on 13 August 1841 at the Gewandhaus in Leipzig with Clara Schumann as the soloist. The complete three-movement version premiered in Dresden on 4 December 1845, again with Clara Schumann, and the dedicatee Ferdinand Hiller conducting. Less than a month later, on 1 January 1846, the concerto was performed in Leipzig, conducted by Felix Mendelssohn.

After this concerto, Schumann wrote two other pieces for piano and orchestra: the Introduction and Allegro Appassionato in G major, Op. 92, and the Introduction and Allegro Concertante in D minor, Op. 134.

== Music ==
I. Allegro affettuoso

II. Intermezzo: Andantino grazioso

III. Allegro vivace
Performed by Sviatoslav Richter and the Warsaw National Philharmonic Orchestra under the direction of Witold Rowicki, 1959.

The concerto is scored for two flutes, two oboes, two clarinets, two bassoons, two horns, two trumpets, timpani, strings, and solo piano. With this instrumentation, Schumann chose the usual orchestration in early Romantic music for this concerto.

The piece, as marked in the score, is in three movements:

1. Allegro affettuoso (A minor)
2. Intermezzo: Andantino grazioso (F major)
3. Allegro vivace (A major)

There is no break between the last two movements (attacca subito). The concerto is about 30 to 35 minutes long, depending on the interpretation.

=== I. Allegro affettuoso ===
The main movement of the concerto is marked Allegro affettuoso; its origin lay in the one-movement fantasy Schumann wrote in 1841, at whose core is the musical development of the conflict between the boisterous Florestan and the dreamy Eusebius, two characters Schumann often used to express the duality of being. The movement is in 4/4 time.

The piece starts with an energetic strike by strings and timpani, followed by a fierce, descending attack by the piano. This exposition chord is followed by a descending, rhythmically incisive chord progression in the solo piano corresponding to the ideal of the boisterous Florestan.

Then, the main, dreamlike theme of Eusebius is introduced by the oboe along with other wind instruments. The melody begins with the notes C–H–A–A, which stand for the Italian spelling of the first name CHiArA of Schumann's wife Clara, who was the soloist at the world premiere of the piano concerto. After its introduction by the woodwinds, the theme is given to the soloist.

In the course of the first movement Schumann varies this theme in many ways. He first offers it in A minor, then in major, and also in small snatches in a slow A♭-major section. The orchestra and especially the clarinet is often used against the piano: while the solo instrument is dedicated to the main theme, the strings begin to intone a Florestan-like, syncopated side thought (bar 41), which becomes increasingly dominant until a variation of the Eusebian theme recurs quietly but urgently.

This is followed by a subsection labeled Animato. At its end Schumann introduces a second theme, which does not reach the significance of the main theme.

The development section begins as a dramatic lament (bar 156). This part is almost an independent section. In A♭ major, the metrically altered main theme is referenced by piano arpeggios. Suddenly, chords of the Florestan theme interrupt. The two struggle, shaping the development with rapid changes of soli and tutti.

With further dramatic progression and a modulation to A minor, the reprise is reached and cites the exposition almost tone for tone. The last tense progression brings forth a solo cadenza of monumental size and virtuosity (bar 402).

In the coda, a throbbing, mysterious 2/4 rhythm dominates. This is turned into a fierce Davidsbündler-march a little later. The main movement of the concerto ends with four tutti chords.

=== II. Intermezzo: Andantino grazioso ===
This movement is in ABA form keyed in F major. The piano and strings open up the piece with a small, delicate tune, which is heard throughout the A section. In the B section in the dominant the cellos and later the other strings and wind instruments display a singing theme which is derived from the piano flourish in bar 7. The piano accompanies the singing theme and interjects but never takes the lead. After a shortened reprise of the A section the movement closes with small glimpses of the first movement's theme before moving straight into the third movement.

=== III. Allegro vivace ===
The movement opens with a huge run up the strings while the piano takes the main A major theme. Schumann shows great color and variety in this movement. Though the nominal time signature is 3/4, the movement in reality alternates between 6/4 and 3/2. The piece is cast in a hybrid sonata-rondo form with an extended and exciting coda, ending with a long timpani roll and a huge chord from the orchestra.

== Intention ==
Despite its three movements, the work has retained the character of a fantasy. The basic idea expressed in the work is that of yearning and happiness between two loving people. Schumann musically transforms his fight for Clara in this work. The main theme of the first movement is similar to the melody of the Florestan aria from Ludwig van Beethoven's opera Fidelio. Congruent with Beethoven, Schumann saw this theme as an expression of the intimate connection between loyalty and the struggle for freedom. In this way the concerto is, like many of his other compositions, based on Schumann's lifelong concern to fight against philistinism with musical means.

== Reception ==
The contemporary reception of the work was consistently positive. Clara Schumann wrote after the premiere: "... how rich in invention, how interesting from the beginning to the end, how fresh and what a beautiful coherent whole!"

Special emphasis was placed on the skilful, colorful and independent orchestral treatment, that would leave room for piano and orchestra alike. The Leipzig Allgemeine Musikzeitung praised the composition on December 31: "because, fortunately, it avoids the usual monotony of the genre, by giving, with great love and care, the obligatory room to orchestra without diminishing the role of the piano, and manages to beautifully link both independent parts together".

The Dresdner Abendzeitung praised the "quite independent, beautiful and interesting orchestral treatment", and recognizes that the "receding of the piano part into the background" could certainly also be seen as progress.

The work may have been used as a model by Edvard Grieg in composing his own Piano Concerto, also in A minor. Grieg's concerto, like Schumann's, employs a single powerful orchestral chord at its introduction before the piano's entrance with a similar descending flourish. Sergei Rachmaninoff in turn used Grieg's concerto as a model for his first Piano Concerto.

The work has become one of the most widely performed and recorded piano concertos from the Romantic period. It has frequently been paired with the Grieg concerto on recordings.

In popular music, the theme of Eusebius (together with Florestan one of Robert Schumann's two imaginary alter egos), which appears played by an oboe and other wind instruments soon into the first movement, might have been an original source of inspiration, possibly via the 1911 suite Goyescas by Spanish composer Enrique Granados, of the song Bésame mucho, whose worldwide success dates back to the 1930s.
