= Il Tramonto (The Sunset) =

Painting by Giorgione

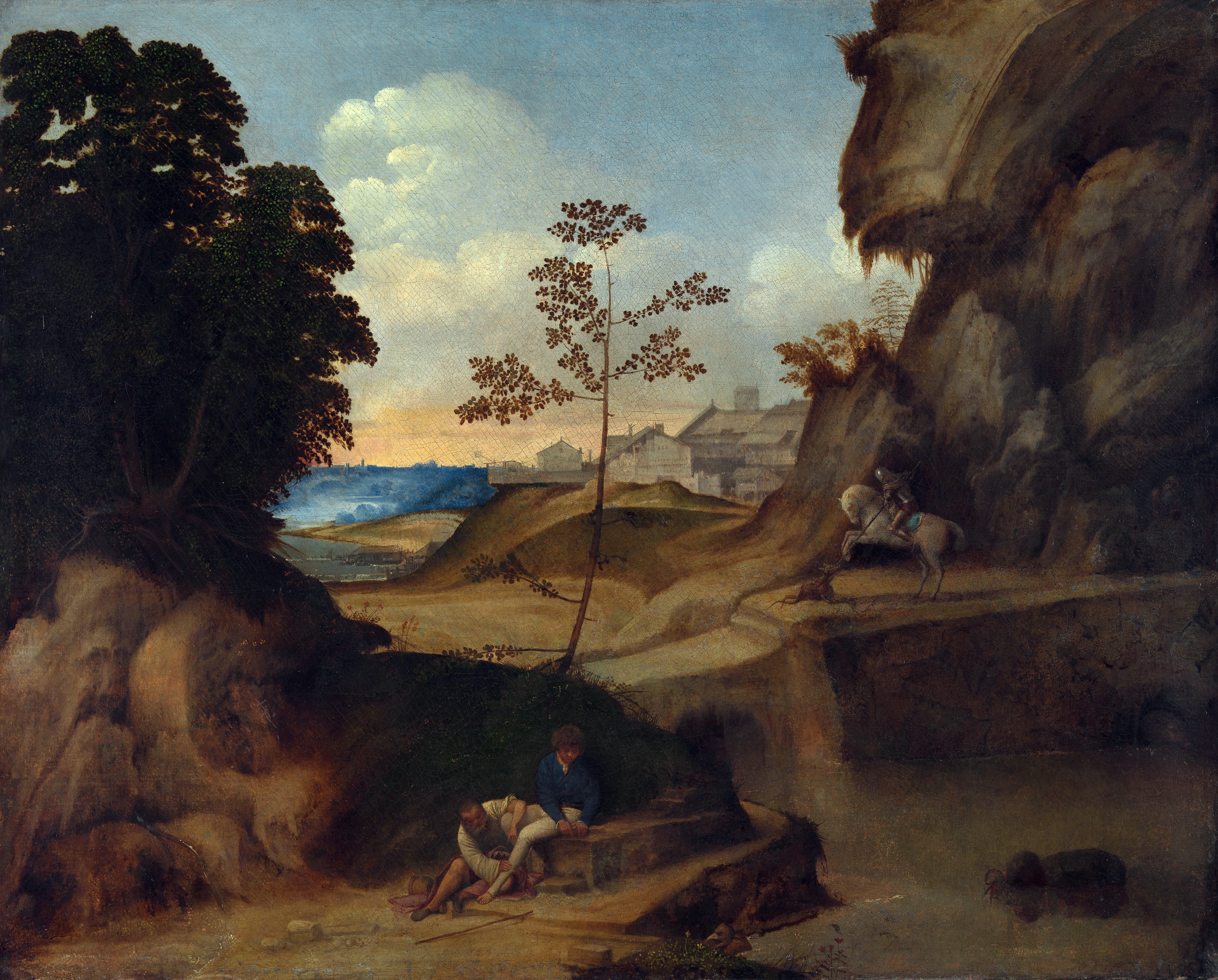
Il tramonto (The Sunset) (c. 1505–1508) by Giorgione

Il Tramonto (The Sunset) is an oil on canvas landscape painting by Giorgione, created c. 1505–1508, now in the National Gallery, London, which bought it in 1961.

In the right background Saint George kills the dragon and Anthony the Great meditates in a cave, whilst Gottard lances Saint Roch's boil in the centre foreground. These sets of figures are divided by a river, as in the same artist's The Tempest. The presence of Saint Roch suggests the work was painted in thanks for the end of the 1504 plague in the Veneto. The work shows influences from both Leonardo da Vinci and the Danube School.

Saint George and the dragon were added during restoration in the 1930s, and a monster in the lake were added during the 1960s, to cover earlier damage.
