= Francesco Santoliquido =

Italian composer (1883–1971)

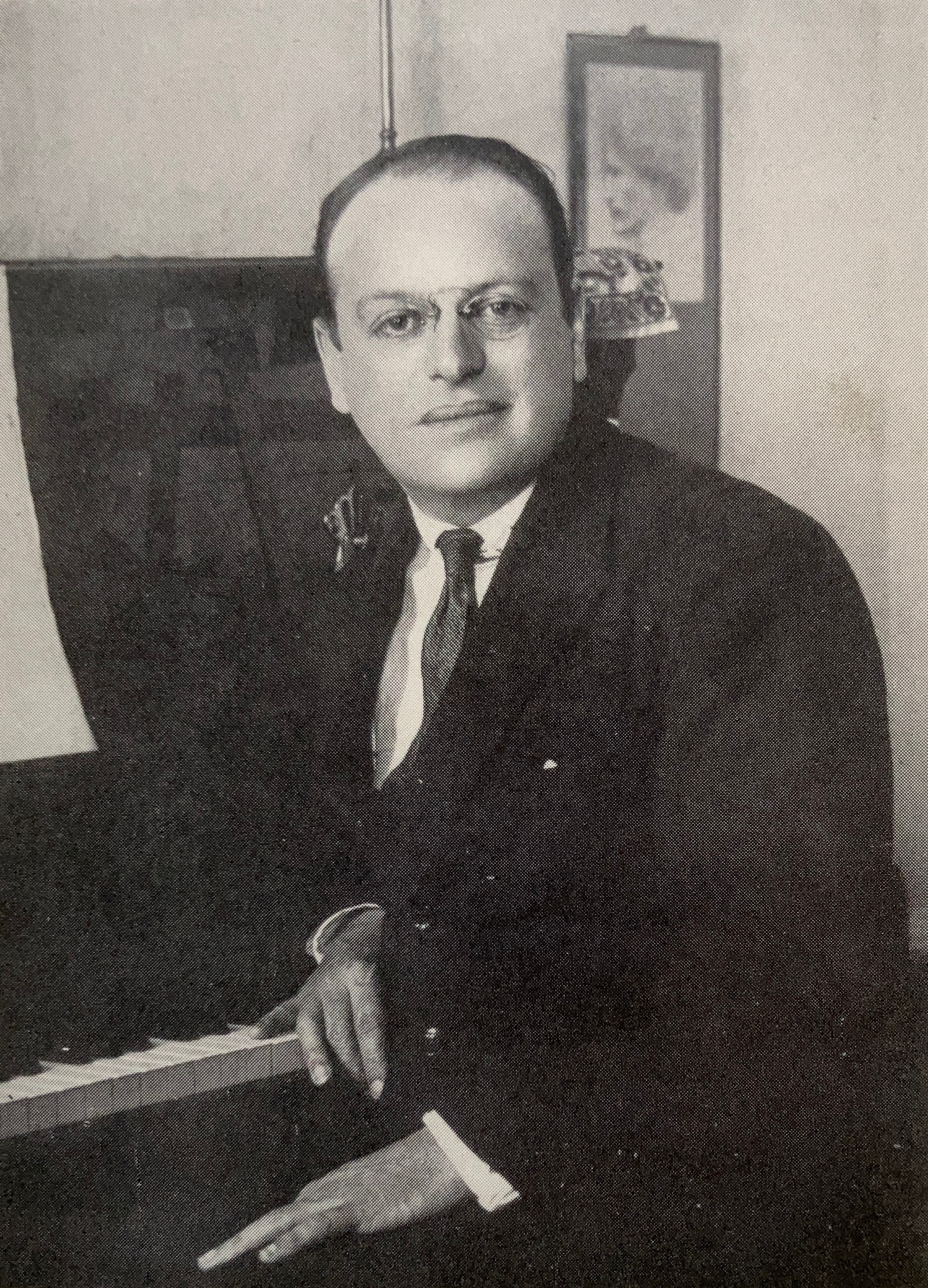
Francesco Santoliquido, circa 1925.

Francesco Santoliquido (1883–1971) was an Italian composer. He studied at the Liceo di Santa Cecilia in Rome, graduating in 1908. His best-known works are his Tre Poesie Persiane, for voice and piano recorded by Amel Brahim-Djelloul and Anne Le Bozec in 2008.

He was born August 6, 1883, in San Giorgio a Cremano (Naples).

His compositions included a violin sonata, a string quartet, a symphony among other works including as noted a number for voice.

He died August 26, 1971, in Anacapri.
