= Luigi Piovano =

Italian cellist and conductor

Luigi Piovano is an Italian cellist and conductor. He is Principal Cellist of the Orchestra dell'Accademia Nazionale di Santa Cecilia, guest Principal Cellist of the Tokyo Philharmonic Orchestra, and guest principal cellist of the Seoul Philharmonic Orchestra. He has recorded on both the modern cello and the Baroque cello (the latter including work as cellist of Concerto Italiano with Rinaldo Alessandrini, chamber music of Robert Schumann with the Michelangelo Piano Quartet for the Chandos label, and the Cello Sonatas of Johannes Brahms). He has also recorded the complete cello works of Camille Saint-Saëns and the Cello Suites of Johann Sebastian Bach. He is a member of the piano trio Latitude 41 with pianist Bernadene Blaha and violinist Livia Sohn, with whom he has recorded the piano trios of Franz Schubert.

He has recorded Vivaldi cello concertos such as the Cello Concerto in a minor, RV 422.
