= Messa di Gloria (Rossini) =

Mass by Gioacchino Rossini

- Mass by Gioachino Rossini
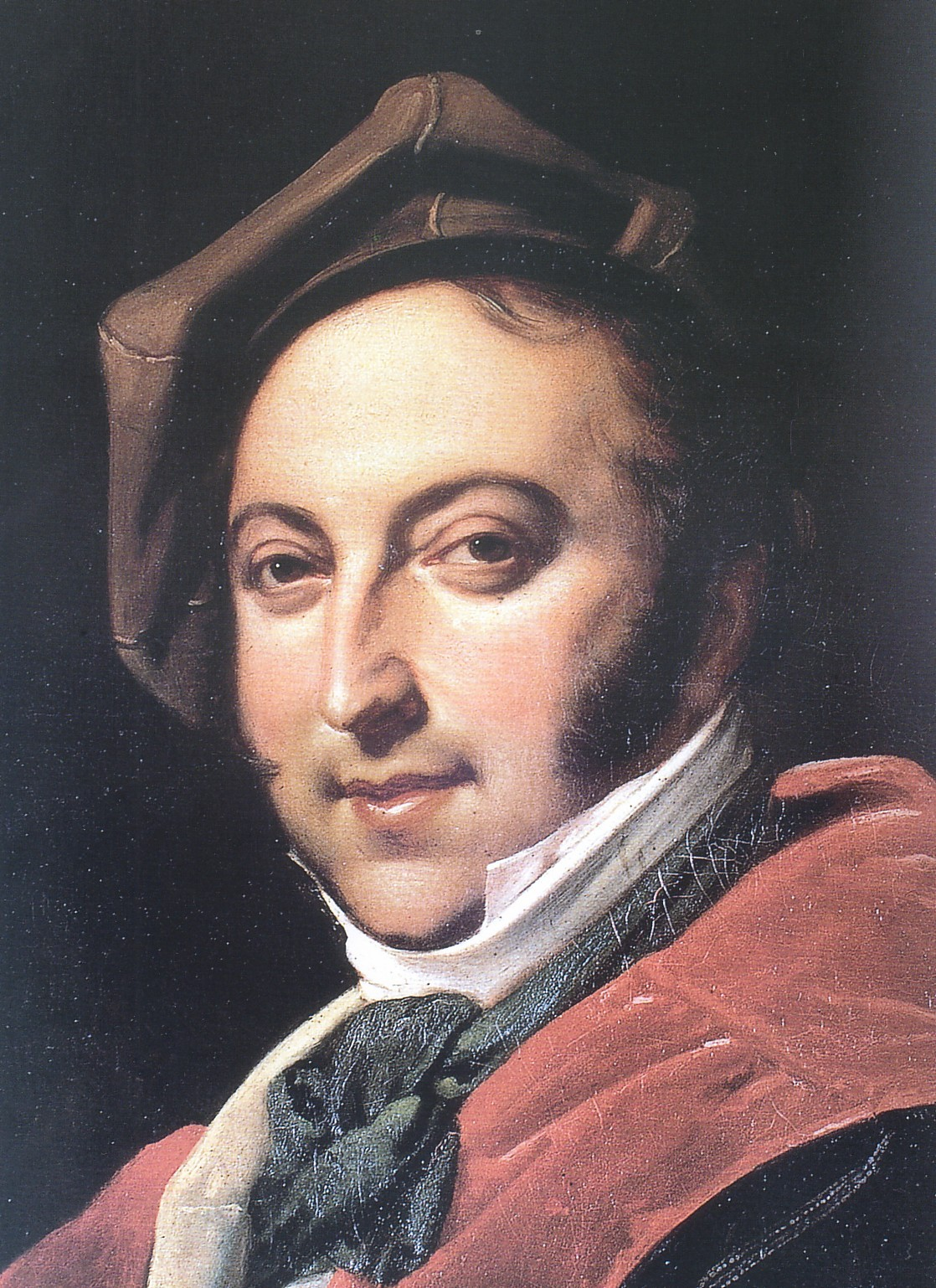
- Rossini, 1820
- Performed: 24 March 1820; 206 years ago Chiesa di San Ferdinando, Naples
- Movements: 9

Messa di Gloria is a nine movement mass, composed by Gioacchino Rossini for the Arciconfraternità di San Luigi. First performed on 24 March 1820 in the Chiesa di San Ferdinando in Naples, it is in the traditional form of a "Gloria" mass, that is a setting of the first two prayers of the Catholic mass, the Kyrie and Gloria. (A "Gloria" mass omits the Credo, Sanctus, and Agnus Dei.) The Messa di Gloria was the only major piece of sacred music written while Rossini was still an active opera composer.

== Analysis ==
The "Kyrie" is divided into three portions, the first a dotted-rhythm "Kyrie eleison" for chorus in E♭ minor, the second, a more lyrical E♭ major "Christe eleison" for two tenors with the first minor-key section rounding out the prayer.

The "Gloria" portion takes up the vast majority of the work and is split up into operatic-style "numbers", soprano soloists alternating with tenors, basses, etc. The high point, emotionally, comes at the "Qui tollis", which begins with a slow portion for chorus and tenor, then concludes with a brilliant cabaletta ("Qui sedes"), showing off the extreme upper end of the tenor's range. Critics of the time were slightly scandalized by Rossini's morphing of sacred ceremony into opera seria, and even buffa, at times.

In his 1995 study of the Messa di Gloria, Jesse Rosenberg agrees with contemporary reports that Rossini was helped in the composition of the concluding "number" of the Messa, a four-part double fugue setting of "Cum sancto spiritu", by another Italian composer more versed in counterpoint, Pietro Raimondi.

== Notes ==
=== Cited works ===
- Gallo, Denise P., Gioachino Rossini: a guide to research, Routledge, 2002. ISBN 0-8153-3474-5
- Osborne, Richard, Rossini: his life and works 2nd Edition, Oxford University Press US, 2007. ISBN 0-19-518129-8.
