= Ludwig van (film) =

1970 film

Ludwig van (full title: Ludwig van: A report; German: Ludwig van: ein Bericht) is a black-and-white German film by Mauricio Kagel. Filmed in 1969, it was first screened the following year. The work was commissioned by Westdeutscher Rundfunk for the bicentennial celebrations of the birth of Ludwig van Beethoven in 1970. The film examines the reception of the composer and his works and how he has become a consumer product of the culture industry. The soundtrack is an arrangement of fragments of Beethoven's works, modified as if heard by the deaf composer himself; it is distinct from Kagel's 1970 composition Ludwig van. Prominent contemporary artists including Dieter Roth, Stefan Wewerka (de), Robert Filliou, and Joseph Beuys were involved in the design. According to Gramophone, "at first it’s a laugh a minute ... then Kagel's film turns dark".

== Summary ==
In the first part of the film, Beethoven visits Bonn of the late 1960s, stopping off at a record shop before embarking upon a tour of the Beethoven-Haus in which he was born; there is a deluge of busts, in the music room every surface is covered in sheet music, and in the final scene his works are hung out to dry in the laundry. There ensues a bridge passage in which he strolls along the Rhine and boards the Cecilie, where he tries to find the source of music but ends up chasing shadows. The second part of the film, a more explicit parody of art films and commentary on the composer's reception, begins with a talk-show in which Karajan is criticised for creating beautiful sound at the expense of revolutionary edge and for conducting the orchestra rather than the music; there follows an encounter with a madman who claims to be Beethoven's true descendant; a sequence set to In questa tomba oscura ("In this dark tomb let me rest"); a scene with a pianist in a lab; and a recital of the Waldstein sonata by a thinly-disguised and super-annuated Elly Ney, where she ends up smoking and the percussive sound morphs into the beating of the heart; the film ends with a scene in a zoo with an owl, tortoise, boar, defecating elephant, and "many ruminants, predominantly ears and paws", accompanied by fragments of the "Prisoners' chorus" from Fidelio and of the Ode to Joy from the Ninth Symphony.

== Analysis ==
A deconstructive analysis of the film investigated Beethoven as a cultural icon, revered yet exploited; the use and misuse of his works, including their appropriation to advance nationalist agendas; the difficulties and anxieties of influence performers face; Beethoven scholarship and attempts to "tame" the composer to accord with bourgeois ideals; and the difficulties of peering through the myths to catch a glimpse of the "real" Beethoven. Kagel uses the term Musealisierung or "musealisation" in speaking of the Beethoven cult, the term used by Theodor W. Adorno to indicate that "museums are the family sepulchres of works of art".

== Reception ==
In West Germany critical opinion was mixed; however, the film was widely condemned in East Germany. According to musicologist Alastair Williams, the latter reaction stems from its "anti-humanist blend of capitalist leisure industry and modernism".
