= Mauricio Kagel =

German-Argentine composer (1931-2008)

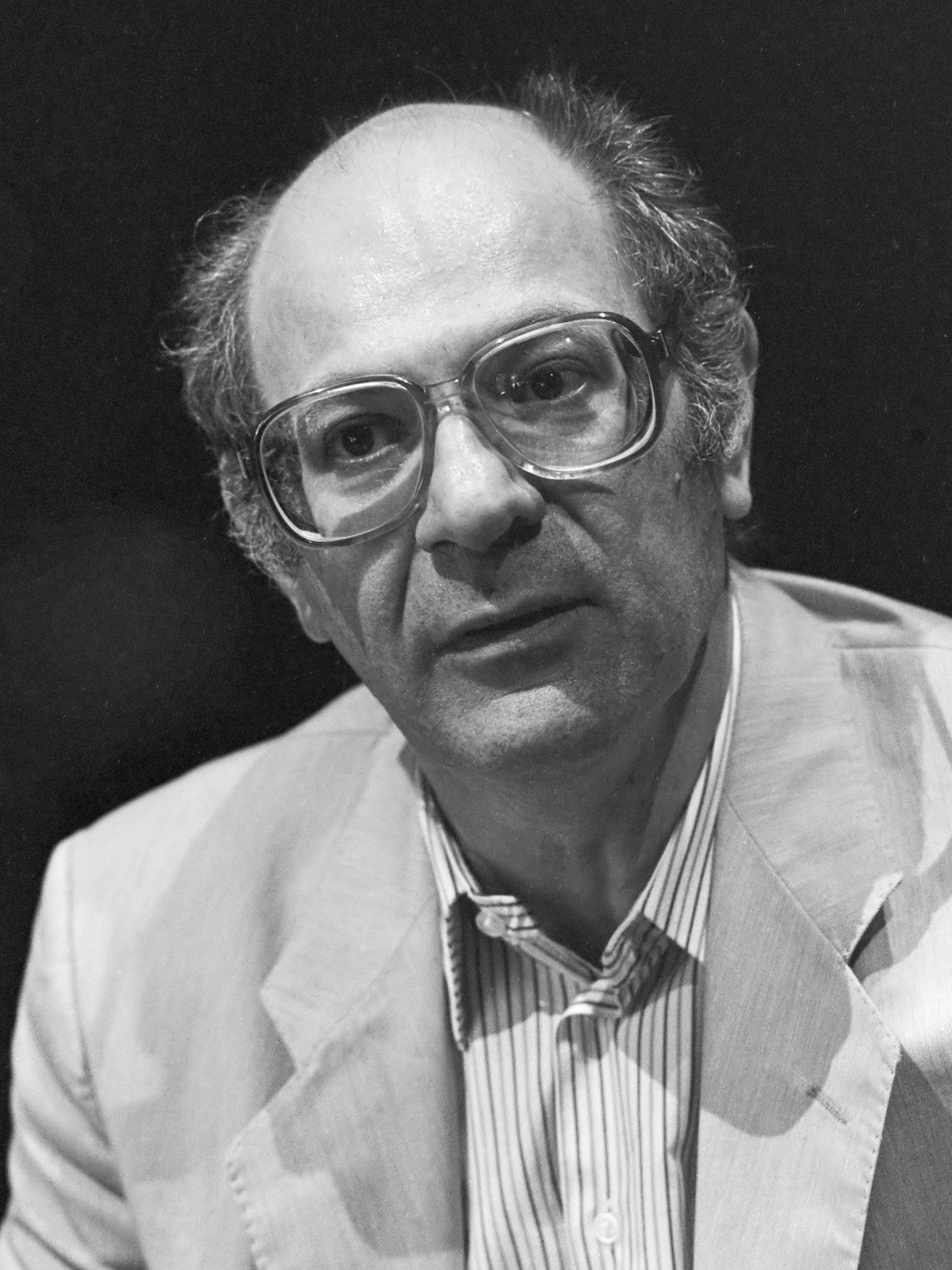
- Kagel in 1985
- Born: Mauricio Raúl Kagel; 24 December 1931; Buenos Aires, Argentina
- Died: 9 September 2008 (aged 76); Cologne, Germany
- Occupations: Composer; Academic teacher
- Known for: List of compositions
- Awards: Ernst von Siemens Music Prize

Mauricio Raúl Kagel (Spanish pronunciation: [mawˈɾisjo ˈkaɣel]; 24 December 1931 – 18 September 2008) was an Argentine-German composer and academic teacher.

== Life and career ==
=== Early life and education ===
Mauricio Raúl Kagel was born on 24 December 1931 in Buenos Aires, Argentina, into an Ashkenazi Jewish family that had fled Russia in the 1920s. He studied music, history of literature, and philosophy in Buenos Aires. In 1957 he moved to Cologne, West Germany, where he lived until his death.

=== As teacher ===
From 1960 to 1966 and from 1972 to 1976 Kagel taught at the Darmstädter Ferienkurse. He also taught from 1964–65 at the University at Buffalo as the visiting Slee Professor of music theory. At the Berlin Film and Television Academy, he was a guest lecturer from 1967 on. In 1968, Kagel was the director of the Scandinavian Courses for New Music in Gothenburg and from 1969–74 he served as the director of the Cologne Courses for New Music, succeeding Karlheinz Stockhausen. He was a professor for new music theatre at the Köln Hochschule from 1974–97.

Among his students were Moya Henderson, Kevin Volans, Maria de Alvear, Carola Bauckholt, Branimir Krstić, David Sawer, Rickard Scheffer, Juan Maria Solare, Norma Tyer, Gerald Barry, Martyn Harry, and Chao-Ming Tung. See: List of music students by teacher: K to M#Mauricio Kagel.

=== As composer ===
Some of his pieces give specific theatrical instructions to the performers, such as to adopt certain facial expressions while playing, to make their stage entrances in a particular way, or to physically interact with other performers. For this reason commentators at times related his work to the theatre of the absurd. He has been regarded by music historians as deploying a critical intelligence interrogating the position of music in society. He was also active in the fields of film and photography. In 1991 Kagel was invited by Walter Fink to be the second composer featured in the annual Komponistenporträt of the Rheingau Musik Festival. In 2000 he received the Ernst von Siemens Music Prize.

== Music ==
Staatstheater (1970) remains, probably, Kagel's best-known work. He described it as a "ballet for non-dancers", although it is in many ways more like an opera; the devices it uses as musical instruments include chamber pots and enema equipment.

Similar is the radio play Ein Aufnahmezustand (1969) which is about the incidents surrounding the recording of a radio play. In Con voce (With Voice), a masked trio silently mimes playing instruments. Match (1964) is a "tennis game" for cellists with a percussionist as umpire, also the subject of one of Kagel's films and perhaps the best-known of his works of instrumental theatre.

Kagel also wrote a large number of more conventional orchestral and chamber pieces. Many of these make references to music of the past by, among others, Beethoven, Brahms, Bach and Liszt.

== Films ==
Kagel also made films, with one of the best known being Ludwig van (1970), a critical interrogation of the uses of Beethoven's music made during the bicentenary of that composer's birth. In it, a reproduction of Beethoven's studio is seen, as part of a fictive visit of the Beethoven House in Bonn. Everything in it is papered with sheet music of Beethoven's pieces. The soundtrack of the film is a piano playing the music as it appears in each shot. Because the music has been wrapped around curves and edges, it is somewhat distorted, but Beethovenian motifs can still be heard. In other parts, the film contains parodies of radio or TV broadcasts connected with the "Beethoven Year 1770". Kagel later turned the film into a piece of sheet music itself which could be performed in a concert without the film—the score consists of close-ups of various areas of the studio, which are to be interpreted by the performing pianist.
