= Introduction and Allegro appassionato (Schumann) =

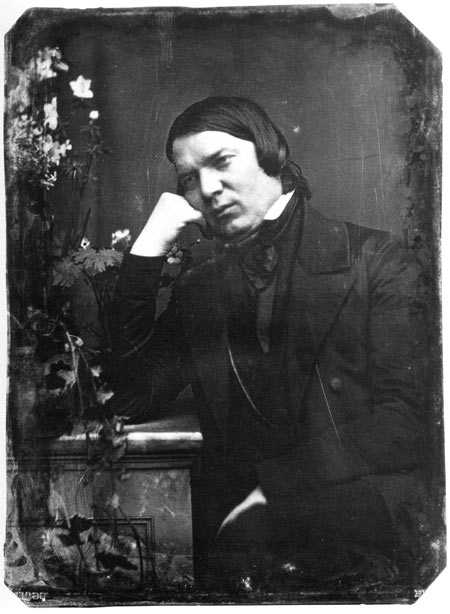
Robert Schumann in an 1850 daguerreotype

The Introduction and Allegro appassionato (Konzertstück) for piano and orchestra in G major, Op. 92, was composed by Robert Schumann in September 1849. It received its first performance in Leipzig on February 14, 1850, with Clara Schumann at the piano with Julius Rietz conducting. The work was published in 1852. The work takes around 15 minutes to perform.

== Music ==
The Introduction and Allegro appassionato is scored for solo piano, pairs of flutes, oboes, clarinets in B♭, bassoons, horns, trumpets and timpani, and strings.

The work consists of two movements:

1. Introduction. Langsam
2. Allegro

== Notable recordings ==
- Vladimir Ashkenazy (piano and conductor), London Symphony Orchestra
- Daniel Barenboim (piano), London Philharmonic Orchestra and Dietrich Fischer-Dieskau
- Murray Perahia (piano), Berlin Philharmonic Orchestra and Claudio Abbado
- Sviatoslav Richter (piano), Warsaw National Philharmonic Orchestra and Stanislaw Wislocki
- András Schiff (piano), Vienna Philharmonic Orchestra and Christoph von Dohnányi
- Rudolf Serkin (piano), Philadelphia Orchestra and Eugene Ormandy
- Wilhelm Kempff (piano), Symphonie-Orchester des Bayerischen Rundfunks and Rafael Kubelik
