= Introduction and Concert Allegro (Schumann) =

1853 composition by Robert Schumann

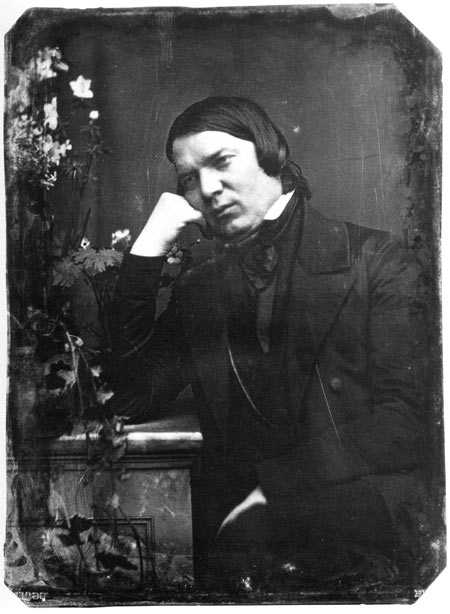
Schumann in an 1850 daguerreotype

Robert Schumann's Introduction and Concert Allegro (German: Konzert-Allegro mit Introduktion) in D minor for piano and orchestra, Op. 134, was one of his last works. Composed in 1853, Schumann gave the autograph score to his wife, Clara Schumann, as a birthday gift; she would give the first performance on 26 November.

The work is dedicated to Johannes Brahms, and a typical performance is 13–14 minutes long.

== Scoring ==
The Introduction and Concert Allegro is scored for solo piano, pairs of flutes, oboes, clarinets in B♭ and A, bassoons, horns, and trumpets, trombone, timpani, and strings.
