= Bianca =

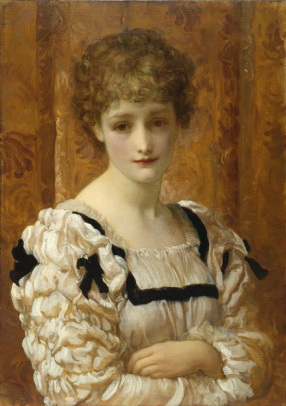
- Bianca by Frederic Leighton, 1881.
- Pronunciation: /biˈæŋkə/ bee-ANG-kə, US also /-ɑːŋ-/ -AHNG- Italian: [ˈbjaŋka] German: [biˈaŋka]
- Gender: Female
- Name day: October 3

Origin
- Origin: Italian
- Meaning: White
- Region of origin: Italy

Other names
- Related names: Bianka; Blanche; Blanca; Branca

Bianca is a feminine given name. It means "white" and is an Italian cognate of Blanche. It is known in the Anglosphere as a character in William Shakespeare's The Taming of the Shrew. It came to greater notice in the 1970s, due to public figures such as Bianca Jagger.

== Variants ==
- Blanche: French
- Bianca: Italian, Romanian, Spanish
- Bianka (Polish, Hungarian, Slovak, German, English, French, Icelandic, Finnish, Dutch, Norwegian, Corsican, Greek)
- Blanca (French, English, Icelandic, Hungarian, Spanish)
- Blanka (Czech, Hungarian, Polish, Croatian)
- Branca (Portuguese)

== People ==
=== Given name ===
==== Medieval period ====
- Bianca Cappello (1548–1587), Italian noblewoman and Grand Duchess of Francesco I de' Medici
- Bianca de' Medici (1445–1505), Italian noblewoman, landowner, and musician
- Bianca Giovanna Sforza, (1482–1496), Italian noblewoman and Countess of Bobbio and Voghera; wife of Galeazzo Sanseverino
- Bianca Lancia (c. 1200–c. 1233), Italian noblewoman; wife of Frederick II, Holy Roman Emperor
- Bianca Maria Sforza (1472–1510), Queen of Germany and Holy Roman Empress; wife of Maximilian I, Holy Roman Emperor
- Bianca Maria Visconti (1425–1468), Italian Duchess of Milan; wife of Francesco I Sforza
- Bianca of Savoy (1337–1387), Italian Lady of Milan; wife of Galeazzo II Visconti
- Bianca Riario (1478–1524), Italian noblewoman and regent; wife of Troilo I de' Rossi

==== Modern era ====
- Bianca Acevedo, American neuroscientist and love researcher
- Bianca Alencar, Brazilian voice actress, dubbing director, singer, songwriter, and digital influencer
- Bianca Allaine (born 1979), American actress, host, and model
- Bianca Allen, American voice actress
- Bianca Amato, South African actress
- Bianca Ambrosetti (1914–1933), Italian Olympic gymnast
- Bianca Andreescu (born 2000), Canadian professional tennis player
- Bianca Andrew (born 1989), New Zealand operatic mezzo-soprano
- Bianca Anghel (born 1985), Romanian long-track speed skater
- Bianca Atterberry (born 1988), American songwriter
- Bianca Atzei (born 1987), Italian singer and television personality
- Bianca Augustyn (born 1998), South African rugby sevens player
- Bianca Baak (born 1992), Dutch middle-distance runner
- Bianca Babb (1856–1950), American pioneer woman and former captive of the Comanche people
- Bianca Bagnarelli (born 1988), Italian artist, writer, illustrator, and cartoonist
- Bianca Bai (born 1982), Taiwanese actress and model
- Bianca Balti (born 1984), Italian model
- Bianca Baptiste (born 1992), English former professional footballer
- Bianca Bardin (born 2000), Italian professional footballer
- Bianca Basílio (born 1996), Brazilian submission grappler, mixed martial artist, and Jiu Jitsu athlete
- Bianca Bazaliu (born 1997), Romanian handballer
- Bianca Beauchamp (born 1977), Canadian fetish model
- Bianca Beetson, Indigenous Australian contemporary artist
- Bianca Belair (born 1989), American professional wrestler, and fitness and figure competitor
- Bianca Bellová (born 1970), Czech writer
- Bianca Berlinguer (born 1959), Italian journalist and former news anchor
- Bianca Biaggi, Brazilian pornographic actress
- Bianca Bianchi, several people
- Bianca Biasi (born 1979), Australian producer, director, actress, and author
- Bianca Bin (born 1990), Brazilian actress
- Bianca Bloch (1848–1901), German author
- Bianca Bonnie, American rapper, singer, songwriter, and television personality
- Bianca Borgella (born 2003), Canadian visually impaired Paralympic sprinter
- Bianca Bosker, American journalist and non-fiction author
- Bianca Botto (born 1991), Peruvian former tennis player
- Bianca Bradey, Australian actress
- Bianca Brandolini d'Adda (born 1987), Italian model, actress, and socialite
- Bianca Buitendag (born 1993), South African Olympic professional surfer
- Bianca Bustamante (born 2005), Filipina racing driver
- Bianca Byington (born 1966), Brazilian actress
- Bianca Canizio (born 1994), American soccer player
- Bianca Carstensen (born 1975), Danish Olympic rower
- Bianca Caruso (born 1996), Italian Olympic sailor
- Bianca Casady (born 1982), American member of musical group CocoRosie
- Bianca Castanho (born 1979), Brazilian actress
- Bianca Castro-Arabejo (1980–2025), Filipina-American transgender drag queen, singer, and television personality
- Bianca Censori (born 1995), Australian-born American architect and model; partner of rapper, songwriter, and record producer Kanye West
- Bianca Chatfield (born 1982), Australian former international netball player
- Bianca Chiminello (born 1976), Australian model and actress
- Bianca Ciambriello, British former model; widow of noble Jago Eliot
- Bianca Claxton, English past member of girl group Parade (group)
- Bianca Collins (born 1988), American actress, curator, and writer
- Bianca Comparato (born 1985), Brazilian actress
- Bianca Costea (born 2005), Romanian Olympic swimmer
- Bianca Cugno (born 2003), Argentine volleyball player
- Bianca Curmenț (born 1997), Romanian handball player
- Bianca D'Agostino (born 1989), American former NWSL- and WPS player
- Bianca Dancose-Giambattisto (born 1994), Canadian artistic gymnast
- Bianca de Jong-Muhren (born 1986), Dutch chess player
- Bianca de la Garza, American journalist and television personality
- Bianca Del Carretto (born 1985), Italian Olympic épée fencer
- Bianca Della Porta (born 1991), Canadian professional ice hockey- and rugby player
- Bianca Del Rio (born 1975), American drag queen, comedian, actor, and costume designer
- Bianca de Oliveira Lima (born 1996), Brazilian badminton player
- Bianca Desai, Indian actress
- Bianca de Vera (born 2002), Filipina actress and Internet personality
- Bianca Devins (2001–2019), American murder victim
- Bianca Dittrich, several people
- Bianca Donati (born 1995), Argentine field hockey player
- Bianca Doria (1915–1985), Italian actress
- Bianca Druță, Moldovan international footballer
- Bianca Dye (born 1973), Australian radio presenter
- Bianca Elmir (born 1982), Saudi Arabian-born Australian boxer
- Bianca Erwee (born 1990), South African retired heptathlete
- Bianca Falcidieno, Italian applied mathematician
- Bianca Farella (born 1992), Canadian Olympic rugby player
- Bianca Farriol (born 2001), Argentine Olympic volleyball player
- Bianca Ferguson (born 1955), American actress
- Bianca Fernandez (born 2004), Canadian tennis player
- Bianca Froese-Acquaye (born 1964), German painter, photographer, producer, vocalist, and author
- Bianca Frogner (born 1979), American health economist and associate professor
- Bianca Garavelli (1958–2021), Italian writer and literary critic
- Bianca Garcia (born 1986), American politician
- Bianca Gascoigne (born 1986), British glamour model and television personality
- Bianca Ghelber (born 1990), Romanian Olympic hammer thrower
- Bianca Giteau (born 1984), Australian former netball player
- Bianca Gittany (born 1999), Australian-born Croatian footballer
- Bianca Golden, American contestant on America's Next Top Model season 9
- Bianca Gomes (born 1990), Brazilian footballer
- Bianca Gonzalez (born 1983), Filipina television host and model
- Bianca Gotuaco (born 1997), Filipina recurve archer
- Bianca Guaccero (born 1981), Italian actress, singer, and television presenter
- Bianca Halstead (1965–2001), American rock musician
- Bianca Hammett (born 1990), Australian Olympic synchronized swimmer
- Bianca Hanif, German past member of pop group Super Moonies
- Bianca Hein (born 1975), German actress
- Bianca Heinicke (born 1993), German fashion- and beauty YouTuber
- Bianca Hendrickse-Spendlove, English actress and journalist
- Bianca Henninger (born 1990), American-born Mexican former professional footballer
- Bianca Hunt (born 1995/1996), Australian television presenter and talent agent
- Bianca Hunter (born 1969), American actress
- Bianca Hyslop, New Zealand Māori dancer and choreographer
- Bianca Ingrosso (born 1994), Swedish blogger, social influencer, television personality, entrepreneur, and singer
- Bianca Jagger (born 1945), Nicaraguan social activist, human rights advocate, and former actress
- Bianca Jakobsson (born 1993), Australian AFLW player
- Bianca Jones Marlin (born 1986), American neuroscientist and assistant professor
- Bianca Joyce (born 1990), Australian former field hockey player
- Bianca Kajlich (born 1977), American actress
- Bianca Kappler (born 1977), German Olympic long jumper
- Bianca King (born 1986), German-born Filipina-Canadian actress and model
- Bianca Knight (born 1989), American former Olympic sprinter
- Bianca Krijgsman (born 1968), Dutch comedian and actress
- Bianca Kronlöf (born 1985), Swedish actress, comedian, and screenwriter
- Bianca Lamblin (1921–2011), French writer
- Bianca Langham-Pritchard (born 1975), Australian former international field hockey player
- Bianca Laura Saibante (1723–1797), Italian poet and playwright
- Bianca Lawson (born 1979), American actress
- Bianca Leigh, American transgender actress
- Bianca Leilua, Samoan competitive sailor
- Bianca Majolie (1900–1997), Italian-born American story artist, concept artist, and writer
- Bianca Manacorda (born 1997), Italian pair skater
- Bianca Manalo (born 1986), Filipina actress and beauty pageant titleholder
- Bianca Mann (born 1995), South African former artistic gymnast
- Bianca Marchesan (born 1999), Brazilian graphic designer and multimedia artist
- Bianca Marcusohn, birth name of Cristina Luca Boico (1916–2002), Romanian communist activist
- Bianca Maria Meda (c. 1661–c. 1732), Italian Roman Catholic nun and Baroque composer
- Bianca Maria Piccinino (1924–2025), Italian journalist and television hostess
- Bianca Marin (born 1999), Romanian handball player
- Bianca Marroquín, Mexican musical theatre- and television actress, and dancer and singer
- Bianca Matte (born 1990), Brazilian model and beauty pageant titleholder
- Bianca Mayer (born 1979), Swiss musician and singer
- Bianca Mendonça (born 1993), Brazilian retired rhythmic gymnast
- Bianca Mikahn, American poet, spoken word artist, hip hop musician, and activist
- Bianca Milesi (1790–1849), Italian patriot, writer, and painter
- Bianca Miquela Landrau, real name of Bia (rapper) (born 1990), American rapper, singer, and songwriter
- Bianca Moon (born 1988), Australian singer-songwriter
- Bianca Mora (born 1996), American professional soccer player
- Bianca Mosca (?–1950), Italian-born British fashion designer
- Bianca Muratagic (born 1977), Swedish singer, hostess, singing teacher, entrepreneur, booking agent, and columnist
- Bianca Narea (born 1986), Romanian Olympic alpine skier
- Bianca Netzler, several people
- Bianca Nicholas, English past member of vocal duo Electro Velvet
- Bianca Nobilo, New Zealand former journalist; daughter of professional golfer Frank Nobilo
- Bianca Noel Piper (born 1991), American person missing since 2005
- Bianca Odumegwu-Ojukwu (born 1968), Nigerian beauty pageant titleholder, politician, diplomat, lawyer, and businesswoman; widow of former Biafran President Chukwuemeka Odumegwu Ojukwu
- Bianca Pagdanganan (born 1997), Filipina professional golfer
- Bianca Pascu (born 1988), Romanian Olympic sabre fencer
- Bianca Piccolomini Clementini (1875–1959), Italian Roman Catholic nun
- Bianca Pinheiro (born 1987), Brazilian comics artist and illustrator
- Bianca Pitzorno (born 1942), Italian writer
- Bianca Poggianti (born 1967), Italian astronomer
- Bianca Quinalha (born 1993), Brazilian BMX rider
- Bianca Raffaella (born 1992), English blind artist, activist, and public speaker
- Bianca Rantala (born 1999), Estonian-Finnish musician, composer, and conductor
- Bianca Răzor (born 1994), Romanian Olympic sprinter
- Bianca Rech (born 1981), German sports director and former professional footballer
- Bianca Reddy (born 1982), Australian former netball player
- Bianca Regina Lyttle Reyes, birth name of Sophie Albert (born 1990), Filipina actress, television personality, model, and singer
- Bianca Reinert (c. 1966–2018), Brazilian biologist and ornithologist
- Bianca Ribi (born 1996), Canadian Olympic bobsledder
- Bianca Rinaldi (born 1974), Brazilian actress
- Bianca Rivera (born 1987), Puerto Rican volleyball player
- Bianca Rosa Hansberg (born 1941), Italian former sport shooter
- Bianca Roses, American contestant on Survivor 48
- Bianca Rossi (born 1954), Italian Olympic basketball player
- Bianca Rowland (born 1990), American volleyball player
- Bianca Russell (born 1978), New Zealand Olympic field hockey player
- Bianca Ryan (born 1994), American musician, singer, and songwriter
- Bianca Salming (born 1998), Swedish heptathlete
- Bianca Sánchez (born 1996), Uruguayan model and beauty pageant titleholder
- Bianca Sandu (born 1992), Romanian footballer
- Bianca Santana (born 1984), Brazilian writer, researcher, journalist, and teacher
- Bianca Santos (born 1990), American actress
- Bianca Saunders (born 1993), British fashion designer
- Bianca Scacciati (1894–1948), Italian operatic dramatic soprano
- Bianca Schenk (1918–2000), Austrian Olympic figure skater
- Bianca Schmidt (born 1990), German footballer
- Bianca Schroeder, Canadian computer scientist and professor
- Bianca Shomburg (born 1974), German singer
- Bianca Sierra (born 1992), American-born Mexican former professional footballer
- Bianca Silva (born 1998), Brazilian rugby union- and sevens player
- Bianca (singer) (born 1948), German singer and composer
- Bianca Smith (born 1991), American professional baseball coach
- Bianca Solorzano (born 1974), American television journalist
- Bianca Spender (born 1976), Australian fashion designer
- Bianca Spriggs (born 1981), American poet, multidisciplinary artist, and professor
- Bianca St-Georges (born 1997), Canadian NWSL player
- Bianca Stigter (born 1964), Dutch writer, director, and producer
- Bianca Stone, American poet and cartoonist
- Bianca Stuart (born 1988), Bahamian Olympic long jumper
- Bianca Szíjgyártó (born 1981), Hungarian former competitive ice dancer
- Bianca Tchoubar (1910–1990), French Ukrainian chemist
- Bianca Thornton, real name of Lady Bianca (born 1953), American electric blues singer, songwriter, actress, and arranger
- Bianca Tiron (born 1995), Romanian handballer
- Bianca Tognocchi, Italian operatic soprano
- Bianca Tragni (born 1944), Italian journalist and writer
- Bianca Turati (born 1997), Italian former WTA player
- Bianca Umali (born 2000), Filipina actress, television host, singer, dancer, and model
- Bianca Urbanke (born 1967), German handball player
- Bianca Valenti (born c. 1986), American professional big-wave surfer and sports equity activist
- Bianca van den Hoek (born 1976), Dutch racing cyclist
- Bianca van der Velden (born 1976), Dutch Olympic synchronized swimmer
- Bianca van Rangelrooy (born 1959), New Zealand artist
- Bianca Viray (born 1983), American mathematician and professor
- Bianca Virnig, American politician
- Bianca Voitek (born 1985), German bodybuilder
- Bianca Walkden (born 1991), English Olympic taekwondo athlete
- Bianca Wallin (1909–2006), Swedish painter
- Bianca Walter (born 1990), German short-track speed skater
- Bianca Webb (born 2001), Australian AFLW player
- Bianca Weech (born 1984), German footballer
- Bianca Weiß (born 1968), German former field hockey player
- Bianca Weinstock-Guttman, American neurologist and professor
- Bianca Williams (born 1993), English Olympic sprinter
- Bianca Williams (anthropologist) (born 1980), American cultural anthropologist, feminist, author, academic, and assistant professor
- Bianca Wood (born 2000), South African field hockey player
- Bianca Woolford (born 1991), Australian Paralympic cyclist with cerebral palsy
- Bianca Wylie (born 1979), Canadian civic tech reformer, open government- and privacy advocate, and writer
- Bianca Xunise, American cartoonist, illustrator, and academic

== Surname ==
- Sondra Bianca (born 1930), American concert pianist and pedagogue
- Stefano Bianca, Swiss architectural historian and urban designer
- Venere Bianca (born 1959), Italian model, pornographic actress, and author
- Viva Bianca (born 1983), Australian actress

== Fictional characters ==
- Bianca, in the Japanese role-playing video game series Dragon Quest
- Bianca (Pokémon), in Pokémon Black and White
- Bianca (Othello), in the c. 1603 UK tragedy play Othello
- Miss Bianca, a literature character created by Margery Sharp
- Bianca Barclay, in the US supernatural mystery comedy TV series Wednesday, played by Joy Sunday
- Bianca Berger, in the German telenovela Bianca – Wege zum Glück, played by Tanja Wedhorn
- Bianca Castafiore, in the Belgian comic series The Adventures of Tintin
- Bianca DeSousa, in the Canadian teen drama TV franchise Degrassi, played by Alicia Josipovic
- Bianca di Angelo, in Percy Jackson & the Olympians
- Bianca Jackson, in the UK TV soap opera EastEnders, played by Patsy Palmer
- Bianca Lussi, in the Italian live-action sitcom Maggie & Bianca: Fashion Friends, played by Giorgia Boni
- Bianca Minola, in the 1590–1592 UK comedy play The Taming of the Shrew
- Bianca Montgomery, in the US TV soap opera All My Children, played by Jessica Leigh Falborn, Caroline Wilde, Lacey Chabert, Gina Gallagher, Nathalie Paulding, Eden Riegel, and Christina Bennett Lind
- Bianca Nugent, in the Australian TV soap opera Neighbours, played by Jane Harber
- Bianca Reyes (comics), in the US comic book publisher DC Comics
- Bianca Scott, in the Australian TV soap opera Home and Away, played by Lisa Gormley
- Bianca Solderini, in the US Gothic vampire novel series The Vampire Chronicles
- Bianca Zanotti, in the Australian TV soap opera Neighbours, played by Annie Gagliardi
- Bianca Zeboat, in the Australian TV soap opera Home and Away, played by Lara Cox
- Bianca Rivera, in the Argentine television series Alguien que me quiera, played by Luisana Lopilato

== Other uses ==
- Bianca (moon), a moon of Uranus

== See also ==
- bianca.com
- Bianka, a feminine given name
- Branca, a feminine given name
- Branka, a feminine given name
- Blanche (given name), a feminine given name
- Blanca (given name), a feminine given name
- Blanka (given name), a feminine given name
