= Frogner (disambiguation) =

Frogner is a borough of Oslo, Norway.

Frogner may also refer to:

== Other things in Norway ==
- Frogner, Akershus, a village
- Frogner stadion, Oslo, a sports stadium
- Frogner church, Oslo
- Frogner manor, Oslo, a manor house

== People ==
- Åse Frogner (1934–2025), Norwegian textile artist and educator
- Bianca Frogner (born 1979), American health economist
- Charlotte Frogner (born 1981), Norwegian actress
- Dag Frogner (1929–2015), Norwegian painter and scenographer
- Einar Frogner (1893–1955), Norwegian politician
- Karoline Frogner (born 1961), Norwegian filmmaker, photographer, writer and lecturer
- Kristin Frogner (born 1978), Norwegian actress, musician and sculptor
