= Blanka (given name) =

- Gender: Feminine
- Language: Czech, German, Hungarian, Slovak, Polish
- Name day: October 7, December 1 Poland October 25 Hungary December 2 Germany

Origin
- Languages: French, German
- Meaning: White, fair

Other names
- Cognate: Blanche
- Anglicisation: Blanche
- Related names: Bianca, Bianka, Blanca, Blanche

Blanka is a feminine given name. Notable people with the name include:

- Blanka of Namur (1320–1363), queen-consort of Sweden and Norway
- Blanka Amezkua (born 1971), Mexican artist
- Blanka Bíró (born 1994), Hungarian handball goalkeeper
- Blanka Lipińska (born 1985), Polish erotic writer
- Blanka Paulů (born 1954), Czech cross country skier
- Blanka Pěničková (born 1980), Czech footballer
- Blanka Říhová (born 1942), Czech immunologist
- Blanka Stajkow (born 1999), Polish singer and model
- Blanka Šrůmová (born 1965), Czech singer-songwriter
- Blanka Szávay (born 1993), Hungarian tennis player, sister of Ágnes Szávay
- Blanka Teleki (1806–1862), Hungarian noblewoman
- Blanka Vlašić (born 1983), Croatian high jumper
- Blanka Waleská (1910–1986), Czech actress
- Blanka Wladislaw (1917–2012), Brazilian-Polish chemist
- Blanka Zizka (born 1955), American theatre director

== See also ==
- Blanca (given name), a feminine given name
- Bianca, a feminine given name
- Bianka, a feminine given name
- Branca, a feminine given name
- Branka, a feminine given name
