= Aaron E. Miller =

American neurologist

Aaron E. Miller is an American neurologist, the first Chairman of the Multiple Sclerosis section of the American Academy of Neurology (AAN) and recognized as a multiple sclerosis clinician.

Miller is both a professor of neurology at the Icahn School of Medicine at Mount Sinai and medical director of the Corinne Goldsmith Dickinson Center for Multiple Sclerosis, both part of the Mount Sinai Medical Center. Additionally, he continues to serve as co-director of the Multiple Sclerosis Care Center at Maimonides Medical Center in Brooklyn.

== Biography ==
Miller graduated from Brandeis University with honors in 1964 and received his medical degree from New York University School of Medicine in 1968. He completed his residency at the Albert Einstein College of Medicine, later acquiring additional postdoctoral training in neurovirology and immunology at the Johns Hopkins School of Hygiene and Public Health.

He was a Lieutenant Commander in the United States Navy from 1971 to 1973.

From 1981 until 2004, Miller headed the Division of Neurology at Brooklyn's Maimonides Medical Center; he continues to serve as co-director of its Multiple Sclerosis Care Center.

Miller was the first Editor of Continuum, AAN's bimonthly continuing education publication, and he is a reviewer for many prominent journals including the New England Journal of Medicine, Neurology and the Archives of Neurology as well as co-author of one of the most-frequently cited articles in Brain: A Journal of Neurology.

In 2001, Miller became the Chief Medical Officer and Chairman of the Clinical Advisory Board of the National Multiple Sclerosis Society (NMSS); he served as chairman of the Clinical Advisory Committee of the New York chapter of the NMSS from 1991 to 2004 and has received grant/research support from Acorda Therapeutics, Biogen Idec, Genzyme, Novartis, and Teva Neuroscience.

He is listed in New York magazine's "Best Doctors" issue of 2008.

== Awards ==
- 1998 – Elected Member, American Neurological Association
- 1985 – current, Fellow, American Academy of Neurology
- 1979 – 1981, Teacher-Investigator Award, NINCDS
- 1968 – Alpha Omega Alpha, New York University School of Medicine
- 1964 – Phi Beta Kappa, Mu chapter of Massachusetts, Brandeis University
- Fellow, New York Academy of Medicine

== Memberships and affiliations ==
- Chairman, Clinical Advisory Committee, National Multiple Sclerosis Society
- Former co-chairman, American Academy of Neurology Education Committee
- Scientific Advisory Committee member, National Multiple Sclerosis Society
- International Advisory Committee on Clinical Trials in Multiple Sclerosis

== Publications ==
Partial list:

- Miller A, Bourdette D, Cohen JA, Coyle PK, Lublin F, Paty DW, Rice GP, Weinstock-Guttman B, editors. Multiple Sclerosis. New York, Continuum; 1999. pp1–196.
- Cutter, GR; Baier, ML; Rudick, RA; Cookfair, DL; Fischer, JS; Petkau, J; Syndulko, K; Weinshenker, BG; Antel, JP; Confavreux, C; Ellison, GW; Lublin, F; Miller, A; Rao, SM; Reingold, S; Thompson, A; Willoughby, E (1999). "Development of a multiple sclerosis functional composite as a clinical trial outcome measure". Brain. 122: 871–882.
- Schwid, SR; Goodman, AD; Apatoff, BR; et al. (December 2000). "Are quantitative functional measures more sensitive to worsening MS than traditional measures?". Neurology. 55: 1901–3. PMID 11134392.
- Miller A. Paroxysmal Disorders. In: Burks JS, Johnson KP, editors. Multiple Sclerosis. Diagnosis, Medical Management and Rehabilitation. New York, Demos Medical Publishing, Inc.; 2000.
- Miller A, Herndon RM. Treatment Issues. In: Kalb RC, editor. Multiple Sclerosis. The questions you have – the answers you need. Second New York, Demos Medical Publishing, Inc.; 2000.
- Miller A. Clinical Features. In: Cook SD, editor. Handbook of Multiple Sclerosis. Third New York, Marcel Dekker, Inc.; 2001.
- Martinelli Boneschi, F; Rovaris, M; Johnson, KP; et al. (August 2003). "Effects of glatiramer acetate on relapse rate and accumulated disability in multiple sclerosis: meta-analysis of three double-blind, randomized, placebo-controlled clinical trials". Mult. Scler. 9: 349–55. PMID 12926839.
- Miller, AE; Coyle, PK (2004). "Clinical features of multiple sclerosis". Continuum. 10: 38–73.
- Panitch, H; Miller, A; Paty, D; Weinshenker, B (2004). "Interferon beta-1b in secondary progressive MS: results from a 3-year controlled study". Neurology. 63: 1788–1795.
- Miller, AE (February 2005). "Glatiramer acetate in the treatment of multiple sclerosis". Neurol Clin. 23: 215–31, viii. doi:10.1016/j.ncl.2004.11.002. PMID 15661095.
- Miller, A (February 2005). "Ethical issues in MS clinical trials". Mult. Scler. 11: 97–8. PMID 15732276.
- Wolinsky, JS; Narayana, PA; O'Connor, P; Coyle, PK; Ford, C; Johnson, K; Miller, A; Pardo, L; Kadosh, S; Ladkani, D (2007). "Glatiramer acetate in primary progressive multiple sclerosis: results of a multinational, multicenter, double-blind, placebo-controlled trial". Ann Neurol. 61: 14–24. doi:10.1002/ana.21079. PMID 17262850.
- Miller A. Ethical consideration in multiple sclerosis clinical trials. In Cohen JA, Rudick RA. Multiple Sclerosis Therapeutics. Third Edition. Informa UK Ltd, 2007.
- El-Moslimany H, Miller A. Escape therapies and management of multiple sclerosis. In Raine C, McFarland H, Hohlfeld R. Multiple Sclerosis: A Comprehensive Text. Elsevier Ltd. Edinburgh, 2008.
