= 1691 in music =

The year 1691 in music involved some significant events.

== Events ==
- July – Johann Heinrich Buttstett succeeds Nicolaus Vetter as organist of the Predigerkirche in Erfurt.

== Published popular music ==
- "The Bachelor's Answer to the Helpless Maiden"
- "The Charming Regent's Wish"

== Classical music ==
- Giovanni Battista Alveri – Mia Vita
- John Blow – Ode for St Cecilia's Day
- Marc-Antoine Charpentier – Marche de triomphe et air, H.547
- Gottfried Finger – A Collection of Musick in Two Parts
- Domenico Galli – Trattenimento musicale sopra il violoncello
- Elisabeth Jacquet de La Guerre – Jeux à l’honneur de la Victoire
- Bianca Maria Meda – Cari Musici (motet)
- Françoise-Charlotte de Senneterre Ménétou – Airs sérieux
- Henry Purcell
  - The Gordion Knot Untied, Z.597
  - The Old Bachelor, Z.607 (pub. 1697)

== Publications ==
- Andreas Werckmeister – Musicalische Temperatur

== Opera ==
The following operas were composed:

- Henry Purcell – King Arthur (with libretto by John Dryden)
- Bernardo Sabadini – Diomede punito da Alcide
- Agostino Steffani – Orlando generoso

== Births ==
- June 14 – Jan Francisci, organist and composer (died 1758)
- December – Conrad Friedrich Hurlebusch, organist and composer (died 1765)
- date unknown – Francesco Feo, opera composer (died 1761)

== Deaths ==
- April 23 – Jean-Henri d'Anglebert, composer (born 1629)
- unknown date – Adriano Morsell, librettist (birth year unknown)
