= Waldow =

Waldow is a surname. Notable people with the surname include:

- B. Waldow, pen name of Bianca Bloch (1848–1901)
- Brad Waldow (born 1991), American basketball player
- Ernst Waldow (1893–1964), German actor
- William F. Waldow (1882–1930), American politician
