= Herlinde =

Herlinde is a German feminine given name. It comes from Old High German and is composed of the stems heri, "armed company, army" and lind, "gentle, soft, mild".

- Herlinde Beutlhauser
- Herlinde Grobe, birth name of Bianca (singer)
- Herlinde Koelbl
- Herlinde Pissarek-Hudelist
