= Bresadola =

Bresadola is an Italian surname. Notable people with the surname include:

- Davide Bresadola (born 1988), Italian Nordic combined skier
- Giacomo Bresadola (1847–1929), Italian mycologist
- Silvano Bresadola (1906–2002), Italian footballer
