= Bianka =

- Gender: Female

Origin
- Origin: Italian and Old French
- Meaning: Italian: white Old French: white, bright

Other names
- Related names: Bianca, Blanche

Bianka is a feminine given name in Hungarian, Russian, Polish, Slovak and German.

== People with the given name Bianka ==
- Bianka (singer) (born 1985), Russian and Belarusian singer
- Bianka Blume (1843–1896), German opera singer
- Bianka Buša (born 1994), Serbian volleyball player
- Bianka Lamade (born 1982), German tennis player
- Bianka Panova (born 1970), Bulgarian gymnast
- Bianka Schwede (born 1953), German rower

== People with the surname Bianka ==
- Dora Bianka (c. 1895–1979), Polish-born French painter, illustrator

== See also ==
- Bianca, a feminine given name
- Blanka (given name), a feminine given name
- Blanca (given name), a feminine given name
- Branca, a feminine given name
- Branka, a feminine given name
