= Bianca Tragni =

Italian journalist and writer (born 1944)

- Angela Bianca Tragni
- Born: January 23, 1944 (age 82)
- Occupations: Writer, journalist
- Writing career
- Language: Italian, English, French, German

Angela Bianca Tragni (born 23 January 1944) is an Italian journalist and writer. Over her career, she carried out research in the culture of the Italian region Apulia and folklore of Southern Italy. She also wrote books on history, especially the Middle Ages.

== Life ==
Bianca Tragni was born on 23 January 1944 in the city of Altamura, in the region Apulia. After she graduated in giurisprudenza (i.e. "law") in Bari and in storia e filosofia (i.e. "history and philosophy") in Florence, she started to write articles on local magazines and newspapers, alternating with her teaching job in Italian high schools. She also dealt with anthropology and folklore and, over her career, she was awarded many prizes related to journalism and culture in general. She later became headmaster of the high school Liceo scientifico Federico II di Svevia (Altamura) (she named the school after Holy Roman Emperor Frederick II of Hohenstaufen).

As a journalist, she wrote articles on some local magazines and some reviews about popular culture on the newspaper La Gazzetta del Mezzogiorno.

In 2004, she also contributed to the founding of association Club federiciano, whose mission is the preservation and enhancement of the historic and artistic heritage of Altamura and Apulia.

== Assignments ==
- Correspondent from Apulia (Italy) of the French historical association Souvenir Napoléonien

== Prizes ==
- Sasso di Castalda, Potenza (1976)
- Leader d'opinione, Roma (1980)
- Città di Gallipoli, Gallipoli (1980)
- Nonino Risit d'Aur Percoto (1982)
- Murgia Dibenedetto-Loizzo Altamura (1983)
- Motula, Mottola (1992)
- Antigone, Bari (1995)
- Mandurion, Manduria (1998)
- Cesare Pavese - Cultura del vino, Santo Stefano Belbo (2005)
- Premio Altamura città del pane DOC, Altamura (2007)
- Festa nazionale dell’Astronomia Federico II, Castel del Monte (2008)
- Club Femminile dell’Amicizia, Santeramo in Colle (2011)
- Mimosa d’argento, Taranto (2012)
- Schòla Federiciana, Lecce (2013)
- Giornata dei Talenti, Taranto (2013)
- Pivot Pierino Piepoli, Castellana Grotte (2016)
- Gioconda Smile’s – Accademia Kronos, Bari (2017)
- Terre di Puglia, Santeramo in Colle (2020)

== Decorations ==
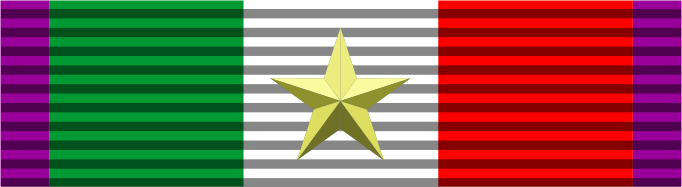

Medaglia d'oro ai benemeriti della cultura e dell'arte

== Works ==
- Morire in Murgia. Bari: Gea editrice. 1977.
- I nomadi del pentagramma: le bande musicali in Puglia. Giovinazzo: Edizioni Peucetia. 1985.
- Itinerari turistico-culturali: la transumanza. Bari: Mario Adda Editore. 1986.
- Artigiani di Puglia. Bari: Mario Adda Editore. 1986. ISBN 978-8880821120.
- Morire di Murgia e altri racconti. Bari: Milella. 1987.
- Pasquale Vilella musicista ed eroe. Roma: Vivere in. 1988.
- Guida turistico-culturale della Puglia: folklore e gastronomia. Bari: Mario Adda Editore. 1988.
- I racconti della fata Murgiana. Milella. 1989. ISBN 978-8880821120.
- I segni della Puglia: la Murgia. Bari: Laterza. 1991.
- Il presepe pugliese: arte e folklore (con C.Gelao). Bari: Mario Adda Editore. 1992.
- San Pietro in Bevagna nella storia e nella tradizione – ed. CRSEC. Manduria. 1993.
- La meravigliosa storia di Federico II di Svevia. Mario Adda Editore. 1994. ISBN 978-8880820000.
- Il mitico Federico II di Svevia. Mario Adda Editore. 1994. ISBN 978-8880821977.
- Lu scegnu ritrovato. Manduria: Filo. 1995.
- Santi di casa nostra, la Puglia dei patroni: festa uguale banda. Monopoli: CRESC. 1996.
- Altamura. Storia, arte, folklore, gastronomia. Filo. 1997. ISBN 978-8887192001.
- Dal merum al primitivo di Manduria. Manduria: Filo. 1997.
- Il re solo. Corrado IV di Svevia. Mario Adda Editore. 1998. ISBN 978-8880822981.
- Claudia Gelao (2000). Il presepe pugliese. Arte e folklore (2 ed.). Mario Adda Editore. ISBN 978-8880821601.
- Un popolo per la libertà: Altamura Leonessa di Puglia (fumetto). Cassano Murge: Messaggi. 1999.
- I racconti della Fata Murgiana. Lecce: Pensa. 2002.
- Anna nella rivoluzione. Bari: Ladisa. 2003.
- Il mare di cristallo. Guida narrata delle cinque torri della costa tarantina da Punta Prosciutto a Torre Ovo. Caforio. 2004. ISBN 978-8889565001.
- Childhood obesity: la figura dell'obeso dalla preistoria ad oggi. Napoli: De Nicola. 2005.
- Il cibo dei morti. Bari: Palomar. 2006. ISBN 978-8876001611.
- Morire di Murgia e altri racconti salentini. Lecce: Pensa. 2006.
- Der Mythische Friedrich II von Hohenstaufen (in German). Translated by C. Jenkner. Bari: Mario Adda Editore. 2007. ISBN 978-8880826965.
- Altamura - Collana guide "Puglia in tasca". Bari: Mario Adda Editore. 2007.
- Favole in cucina. Palomar. 2008. ISBN 978-8876002830.
- La cattedrale di Altamura fra restauri scoperte interpretazioni. Edizione illustrata. Mario Adda Editore. 2009. ISBN 978-8880828617.
- La Cathédrale d'Altamura unique édifice religieux de Frédéric II (in "Frédéric II de la Sicile à l'Alsace") (in French). Zinswiller: APECM. 2010.
- Storia e didattica del Risorgimento (a cura). Altamura: Liceo Scientifico "Federico II". 2010.
- Il Risorgimento in Puglia: 1799-1861 (a cura). Bari: Comitato pugliese per il 150° anniversario dell'Unità d'Italia. 2010.
- I nostri eroi. Breve manuale di storia del Risorgimento in Puglia. Mario Adda Editore. 2011. ISBN 978-8880829720.
- Tutte le donne dell'imperatore. L'universo femmenile di Federico II di Svevia. Mario Adda Editore. 2012. ISBN 978-8867170470.
- Re Gioacchino Murat. La Puglia. Bari nel secondo centenario della nascita di Bari nuova. Mario Adda Editore. 2013. ISBN 978-8867170623.
- Fior da…Fiore: antologia degli scritti di Tommaso Fiore. Cassano Murge: Messaggi. 2014.
- Le légendaire Frédéric II de Hohenstaufen (in French). Translated by C. Jenkner. Mario Adda Editore. 2015. ISBN 978-8867171743.
- The legendary Frederick II of Hohenstaufen. Translated by C. Jenkner. Mario Adda Editore. 2015. ISBN 978-8867171613.
- Racconti nei sassi. Mario Adda Editore. 2016. ISBN 978-8867172283.
- Santa Maria del Casale a Brindisi. Ediz. illustrata. Mario Adda Editore. 2017. ISBN 978-8867172917.
- Cagnazzi. Uno scienziato nelle rivoluzioni. Mario Adda Editore. 2017. ISBN 978-8867173365.
- Da Castel del Monte a l'Asmara...e ritorno: storia di Michele Balacco, costruttore di Molfetta. Mario Adda Editore. 2018. ISBN 978-8867173723.
- Nicolino va alla guerra: il romanzo di un agricoltore pugliese nella fornace della Grande guerra. Mario Adda Editore. 2018. ISBN 978-8867173815.
- Anna Ximenes: Storia d'amore e di rivoluzione. Edizioni di Pagina. 2019. ISBN 978-8874706822.
- 1799 - Altamura Leonessa di Puglia - Storia di una breve utopia (fumetti Paolo Maggi). Fasi di Luna. 2019. ISBN 978-8867174430.
- Murat, un re di Napoli venuto dall'Europa. EAI (Edizioni Accademiche italiane). 2020.
- Il capolavoro di Federico II: l'arte di cacciare con i falchi (De arte venandi cum avibus). Roma: Il Cigno GG. (in via di pubblicazione)
- Gigli fioriti di Murgia. Bari: Mario Adda Editore. (in via di pubblicazione)

=== Publications ===
- "Il piviale di monsignor De Gemmis: un raro cimelio di re Murat in Altamura". La Cattedrale e l'Imperatore - Re Giuseppe Napoleone Bonaparte e la Corte d'appello di Altamura - Atti del convegno internazionale tenutosi in data 9 novembre 2019 ad Altamura. 6. Studio Stampa, di Nicola Schiraldi, per conto dell'Associazione "Club Federiciano": 62–72. 2019.
