= Bianca Hein =

German actress

- Born: 9 September 1975 (age 50); Saarbrücken, West Germany
- Occupation: actress

Bianca Hein (born 9 September 1975, in Saarbrücken) is a German actress.

== Life ==
Born and raised in Saarland, Hein first appeared on stage at the age of five. Together with her father, she acted in various fairy tales and farces at the Naturbühne Gräfinthal. Another great passion of hers was music. As a child, she was sent to early musical education, followed by recorder, guitar and piano lessons. At the age of 13, she received her first singing lesson and became a member of the children's choir of the Saarländisches Staatstheater.

In 1995, she graduated from high school and passed the entrance exam at the Folkwang-Hochschule in Essen. There she studied acting, singing and dance until 1999. During her studies, she was engaged at the Düsseldorfer Schauspielhaus and the Theater im Rathaus in Essen. She also made a short film for the Academy of Media Arts Cologne. After her studies, Hein received her first engagement at the Grenzlandtheater Aachen. There she played four leading roles during one year and was awarded the Karl-Heinz-Walther-Prize for the best young actor in 2000.

Since November 2019, she has been active as a Saarland ambassador.

== Personal life ==
At the end of 2008, Bianca Hein became the mother of a daughter. She lives with her boyfriend in Munich. Her second child was born in early 2013.

== Filmography ==
=== films ===
- 1998: Der Abschied (short film KHM)
- 2002: Der letzte Lude (feature film)
- 2003: Die Sandra Situation (short film)
- 2006: Verliebt in Berlin - Das Ja-Wort
- 2008: Der Prinz von nebenan

=== Series ===
- 2001–2002: Unter uns
- 2003: Balko
- 2003: SOKO Köln
- 2004: Mein Chef und ich
- 2005–2006: Verliebt in Berlin
- 2006–2020: SOKO 5113 (since January 2016 the series is called SOKO München)
- 2008: Angie – Zickenalarm (2. Season, No. 4)
- 2011: Wilsberg – Tote Hose (Episode 32)
- 2016: Hubert und Staller – Babyblues (Episode 71)
- 2016: In aller Freundschaft – Liebende Mütter (Episode 751)
- 2019: Wir sind die Welle
- 2019: Frühling – Weihnachtswunder
- 2020: Um Himmels Willen – Nervensäge (Episode 237)
- 2020: Die Chefin – Schuld (Episode 56)
- 2020: Friesland – Gegenströmung
- 2021: Notruf Hafenkante – Selbstbestimmt (Episode 378)
- 2023: Die Rosenheim-Cops – Ein neuer Italiener

== Music video ==
- 2003: Rolf Stahlhofen – Große Mädchen
