= Corinne Goldsmith Dickinson Center for Multiple Sclerosis =

Hospital in Manhattan, New York

Coordinates: 40.78907°N 73.95459°W

The Corinne Goldsmith Dickinson Center for Multiple Sclerosis
- Established: 2001
- Director: Fred D. Lublin, MD
- Location: Manhattan, New York City, New York, US
- Website: www.mountsinai.org/mscenter

The Corinne Goldsmith Dickinson Center for Multiple Sclerosis is a multiple sclerosis research and treatment center in New York City.

In 2005, it received one of the largest grants ever given for MS research in the United States, a $25 million grant from the National Institutes of Health to study the effectiveness of combining two disease-modifying drugs, and the individual factors that determine disability.

The Center is a part of Mount Sinai Medical Center in Manhattan. Both the Center's Director, Fred D. Lublin, M.D., and the Center's Medical Director, Aaron E. Miller, M.D. are listed in New York Magazine's "Best Doctors of 2008."

== History ==
The Center was established in 2001 with a $5 million endowment from George J. Gillespie, III and Mount Sinai Hospital trustee Clifford H. Goldsmith. It is named in honor of Goldsmith's daughter, Corinne, who coped with the disease until her death in 1999.

== Basic research ==
The pathologic hallmarks of multiple sclerosis are central inflammation, blood–brain barrier permeability, demyelination, progressive axonal transection, and reactive astrogliosis. Demyelination is associated with conduction deficits in affected nerves, including conduction block, a major cause of symptoms early in the disease. It has also been linked to axonal loss, which is associated with permanent deficits later in the disease course. Conversely, remyelination is associated with return of conduction and clinical recovery, but remyelination often fails as the disease progresses, for reasons that are not well understood.

Research in the CGD Center's laboratory (led by Dr. Gareth John) focuses on the mechanisms that control lesion formation and repair in MS. The laboratory is currently supported by grants from the National Institutes of Health, the National Multiple Sclerosis Society, biotech corporations, and private benefactors; work from the laboratory has been published in scientific journals including Nature Medicine and the Journal of Neuroscience.

In a recent study, team members identified the soluble mediator interleukin-11 (IL-11) as a factor that potentiates the survival and maturation of oligodendrocytes, the cells in the brain that produce myelin and are the target of immune attack in MS. IL-11 expression is upregulated at the border of remyelinating lesions in MS. It may represent a potential target for the design of new therapies to promote lesion repair. These findings were recently published.

Using a related approach, members of the laboratory recently found that signaling through Notch1 receptors is activated in oligodendrocyte progenitor cells (OPC) in MS lesions. In the developing CNS, Notch1 restricts OPC differentiation, and is permissive for progenitor expansion. Thus, activation of this pathway in the adult may regulate remyelination. To test this hypothesis, the laboratory has targeted Notch1 inactivation to early OPC in genetically modified animals, using OLIG1Cre:Notch1^{12f/12f} mice. They have found that remyelination is potentiated in these animals, whereas OPC proliferation is restricted. These results suggest regulation of Notch signaling as a therapeutic avenue to enhance remyelination in MS. They were recently submitted for publication.

These studies and others from the laboratory have produced findings that may be relevant to lesion repair in MS. They share a common molecular/cellular approach, beginning with target identification using functional genomics, and progressing through experiments in tissue culture models and into genetically modified animals. The long-term goal of this research is to identify novel therapeutic strategies for MS.

With new drug therapies emerging rapidly, the CGD Center has established a clinical trials program to design and implement tests of experimental agents and allow patients access to therapies not yet widely available.

=== Clinical trials ===
Study Name	Protocol Title	Sponsor
ASSERT	A Multi-Center, Randomized, Double-Blind Placebo Controlled Study Assessing the Add-On Effect of Oral Steroids in Relapsing Remitting Multiple Sclerosis Subjects Treated with Glatiramer Acetate (COPAXONE)	Teva Pharmaceutical Industries
CombiRx	NIH/NINDS UO1 NS04571901: A Multi-Center, Double-Blind, Randomized Study Comparing the Combined Use of Interferon Beta-1a (AVONEX) and Glatiramer Acetate (COPAXONE) to Either Agent Alone in Patients with Relapsing Remitting Multiple Sclerosis (CombiRx-Phase III)	NIH
MS F203 EXT	Open-Label Extension Study to Evaluate the Safety, Tolerability and Activity of Oral Fampridine-SR in Subjects with Multiple Sclerosis who Participated in the MS F203 Trial	Acorda
MS F204 EXT Trial	Open Label Extension Study to Evaluate the Safety, Tolerability and Activity of Oral Fampridine-SR in Patients with Multiple Sclerosis who Participated in the MS F204 Trial (MS F204 EXT)	Acorda
MS F204 Trial	Double-Blind, Placebo-Controlled, 13-Week, Parallel-Group Study to Evaluate Safety and Efficacy of Oral Fampridine-SR (10 mg b.i.d.) in patients with Multiple Sclerosis	Acorda
Novartis 2309 Project	A 24-Month, Double-Blind, Randomized, Multi-Center, Placebo-Controlled, Parallel-Group Study Comparing Efficacy and Safety of FTY720 1.25 mg and 0.5 mg Administered Orally Once Daily Versus Placebo in Patients with Relapsing Remitting Multiple Sclerosis	Novartis
Rituxan	A Phase II/III, Randomized, Double-Blind, Parallel-Group, Placebo-Controlled, Multi-Center Study to Evaluate the Safety and Efficiency of Rituximab in Adults with Primary Progressive Multiple Sclerosis: U2786g	Genentech

== Clinical care ==
The CGD Center sees over 4,800 patients annually, 1,000 of whom each year are new. The Center utilizes a team of doctors, nurse practitioners, fellows, social workers, consultants and a psychiatrist in its integrated approach to enhancing the treatment of MS, attracting visiting neurologists and patients worldwide.

== Community and patient support ==
Many MS Centers provide additional resources with the understanding that some of the most immediate concerns of the newly diagnosed are not medical but social and psychological. In addition to providing full-time social workers for patients and their families through two LCSWs, the CGD Center is unique in providing the services of a psychiatrist trained in the psychiatric manifestations of MS. The Center also provides monthly patient education seminars discussing research and treatment topics.
