= Rovereto =

City in Trentino-Alto Adige

- Comune
- Rovereto
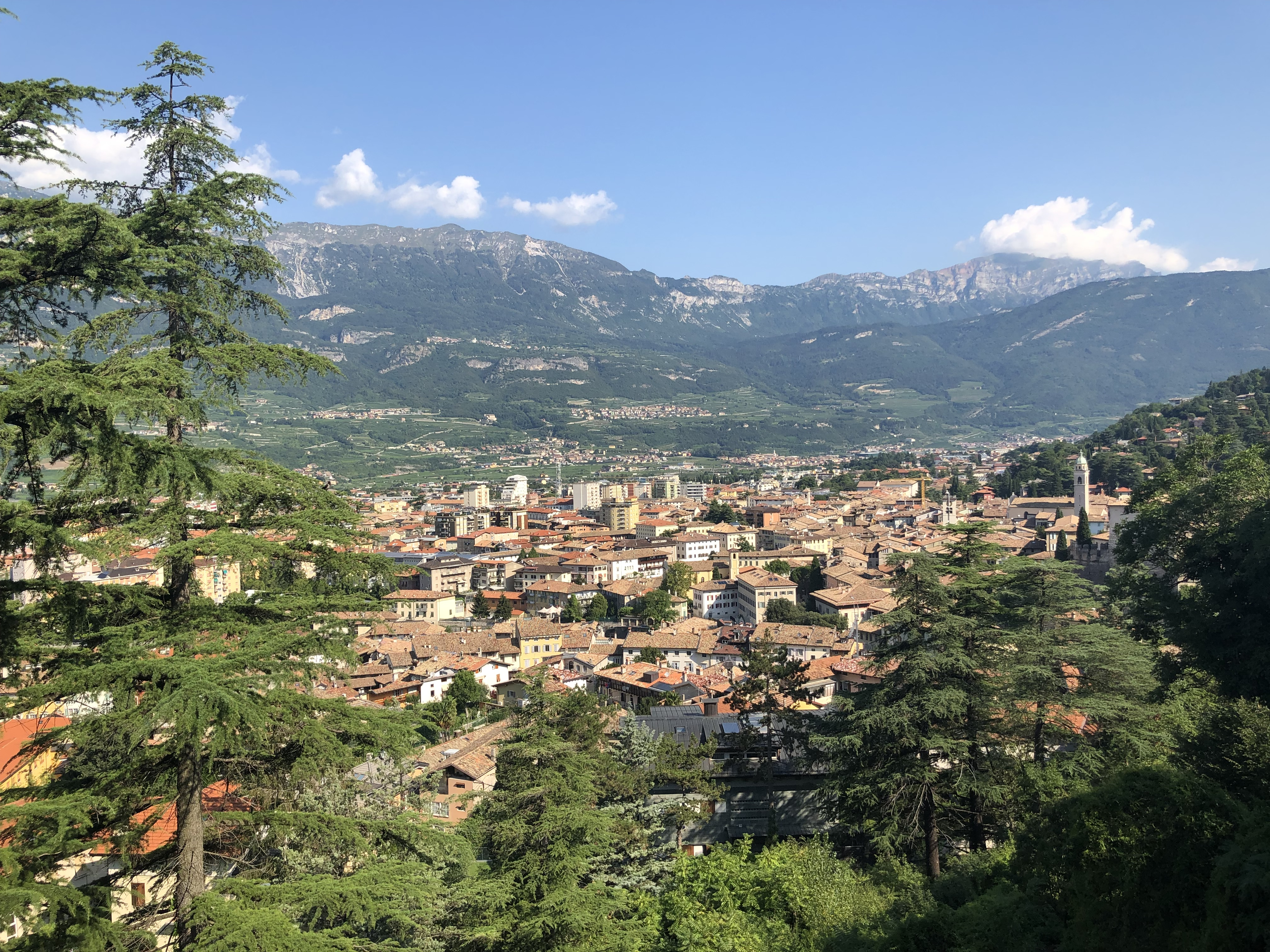
- Panorama of Rovereto, with Monte Cengialto (on the right)

- Flag Coat of arms

- Location within Italy Location within Trentino-Alto Adige/Südtirol
- Coordinates: 45°53′N 11°3′E
- Country: Italy
- Region: Trentino-Alto Adige/Südtirol
- Province: Trentino (TN)
- Frazioni: Borgo Sacco, Lizzana, Lizzanella, Marco, Mori Stazione, Noriglio, San Giorgio, Santa Maria, Sant'Ilario

Government
  - Mayor: Robol Giulia

Area
  - Total: 50 km^{2} (19 sq mi)
- Elevation: 204 m (669 ft)

Population (31 March 2018)
  - Total: 39,915
  - Density: 800/km^{2} (2,100/sq mi)
- Demonym: Roveretani
- Time zone: UTC+1 (CET)
  - Summer (DST): UTC+2 (CEST)
- Postal code: 38068
- Dialing code: 0464
- Patron saint: Saint Mary of the Snow
- Saint day: 5 August
- Website: Official website

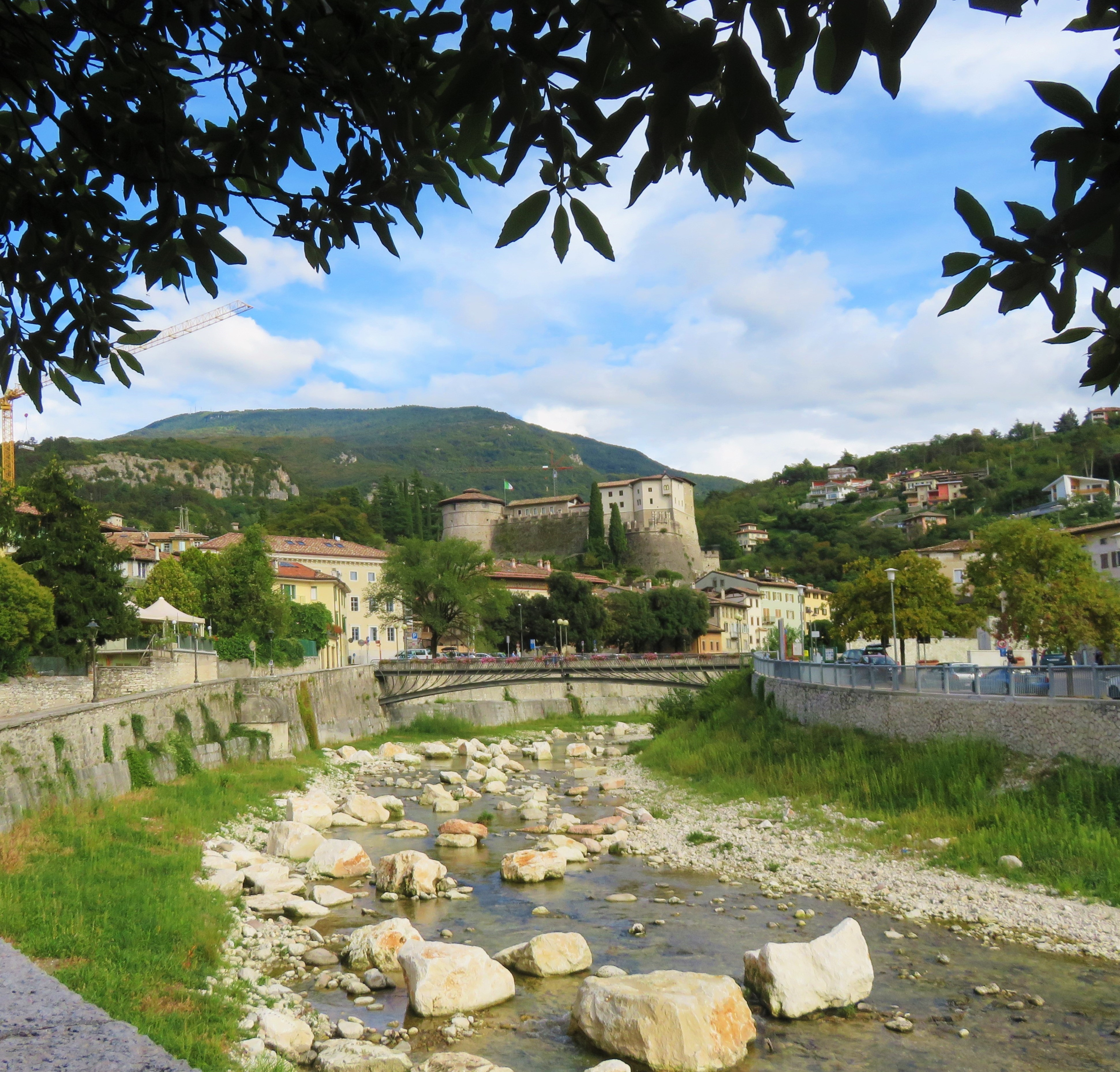
Rovereto castle.

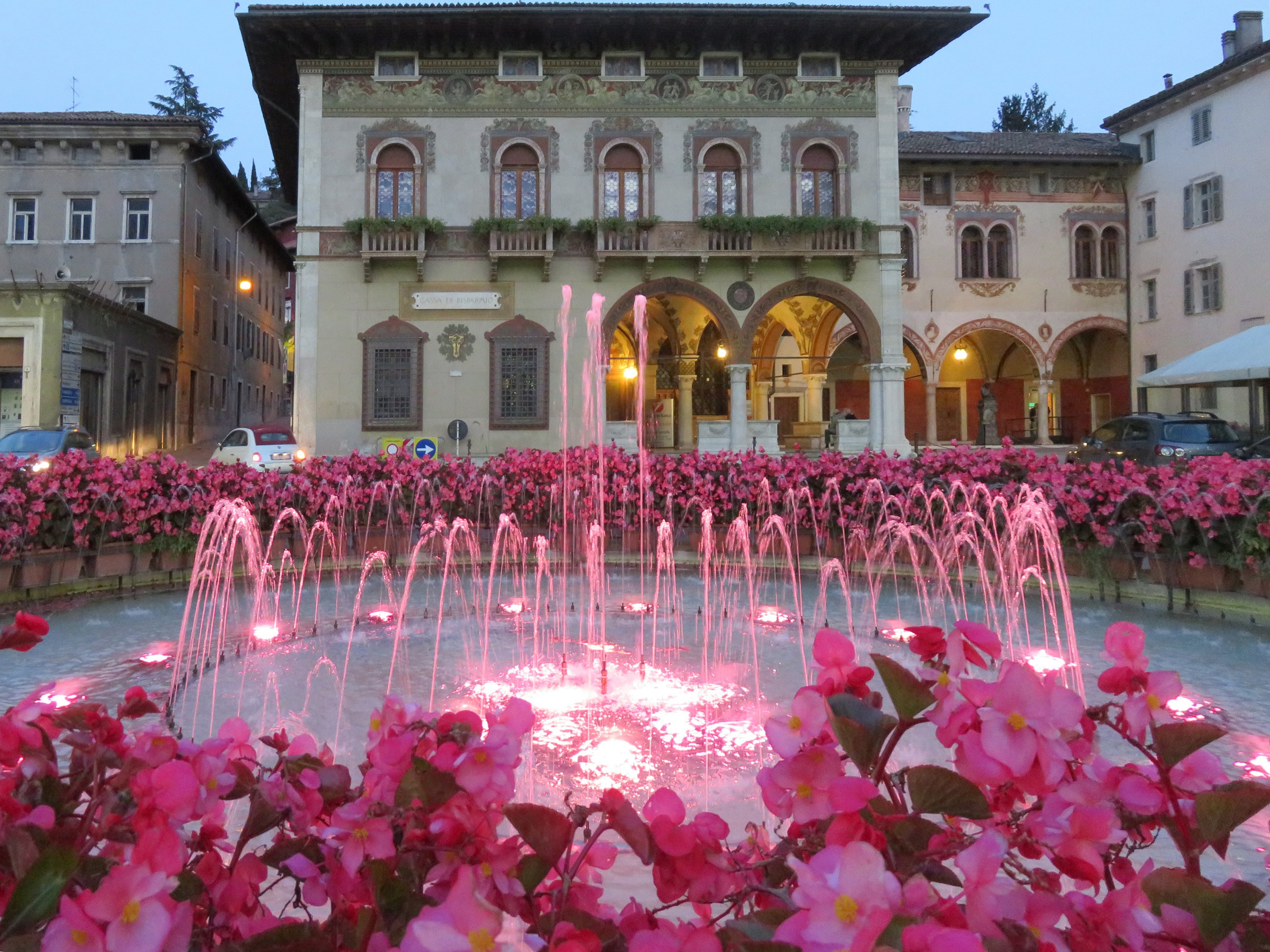
The Rosmini Fountain.

Rovereto (Italian pronunciation: [roveˈreːto]; "wood of sessile oaks"; locally: Roveredo; ladin: Rurëi) is a city and comune in Trentino in northern Italy, located in the Vallagarina valley of the Adige River.

== History ==
Rovereto was an ancient fortress town standing at the frontier between the Republic of Venice – an independent state until 1797 – and the Prince-Bishopric of Trent – a state of the Holy Roman Empire. In the Middle Ages it was known by its German toponyms Rofreit and Rovereith. This town started to be populated with inhabitants of the prehistory with traces that were found where today are the oldest ways which belong to the actual main historical centre, around via della Terra. The town has a complexity of plans which are printed in various developments, as if it could have different directions to evolve an ideal, brought towards its completeness in the 15th century, from the model of Siena – the leaf of the crown and the classic Athens reference of the foxil Nautilus. Some of the traces left behind (apart from the prehistoric levels) are concerned with the Roman period and, in modern times, with the disappearance of the Saint Thomas door and the hospital that had its name. Let us retrace the comparison: while Siena has Saint Mary as the actual general hospital of the town in regard of which replace the symbols of the basilica, Saint Thomas of Canterbury was a hospital probably for orphans as the one of Saint Catherine.

The town has therefore different reminiscences: a leaf shape (the blazon image is "The Town of the Oak" and, as a lanceolate leaf forms the antique part of the town, it recalls the lance of the Roman army) which in other regards is completed by a coquille form of plan, with more of archaeological expectations, as a radiant line, that in some aspects, may recall to us again the triangular geometric construction of a pure alignment of elements. Up to the mountains, with a hermitage built on the rocks, San Colombano on its way up there is on the left the castles of the town, which has become a memorial museum of the history of the wars as the First World War was close to these boundaries.

In 1509 it became an exclave of the Habsburg (Austrian) County of Tyrol and remained so until Trent was absorbed into Tyrol in the 1803 Reichsdeputationshauptschluss.

In the 16th and 17th centuries the town had a development of cultural and educational institutions, with a call for building from the architects of Lombardy (Comaschi-builders-stone workers), for a unity of style, which does not lack curious humour: at every corner, of the Renaissance part of the city – faces, masked and frowning, when not regarding with such stern expression to surprise, are merging some visible points. The history of education starts its scholarship with Descartes's idea of a human being, with its cathedra threshold of anatomy and renews its philosophic pedagogy with the priest – philosopher Antonio Rosmini, in the aesthetic tradition of text–art resources. Roads are therefore built in a rational cut: brevity, then clarity and scientific development of the thought. In the 16th century, the expansion of the town permits to continue the construction of small but high buildings and to use the river to structure small canals for water. Therefore, the colour industry starts with silk and textile its adventure from the more advanced and widespread Venetian corners.

On 4 September 1796, during the War of the First Coalition (French Revolutionary Wars) the Battle of Rovereto took place resulting in victory for the forces of the French First Republic against the Habsburg forces. During the Napoleonic Wars Rovereto was controlled by Bavaria from 1805 (Peace of Pressburg, from 1808 within the Etschkreis), and then by the Napoleonic Kingdom of Italy from 1809 (Treaty of Schönbrunn, Department of Alto Adige). It returned to Austrian control (as part of the County of Tyrol) in 1815 following the Congress of Vienna. Rovereto was the centre of Kreis Roveredo, one of the seven Kreise within Tyrol and Vorarlberg until 1849.

The 19th century is characterized by the influence of the rediscovery of the romance history, with all the consequences of ratios: a tribunal is placed in the area of the new town, with the main external road in its proximities. In a certain regard, it could be said that it is the handle of Saint Catherine's sword on the right side of the Corso where we can find the monastery. Indeed, the road ends up with a piazza and a corner toward the meridian Corso (New Corso – Corso Nuovo) that brings us to the Licei. The organization of the triangular setting is quite easy to collect as a zoning system of areas: we can find a trivium of the oldest part of the town, in its original settlement – but a rational Euclidean square corner in the Modern; an extension of the triangular area that develops and gathers some of the actualized styles of Roman genres (the 19th century and the Post Modern, as Fortunato Depero discovered) at its base on the main road to the province of Trento.

After World War I, southern Tyrol, including Rovereto, passed to the Kingdom of Italy in the Treaty of Saint-Germain.

The town in the 20th century (the Novecento) was recognized as a Peace Town for its Courtois origin and because of its bell dedicated to the fallen people of the "Grande Guerra".

== Geography ==
This city is east of Riva del Garda (at the north-western corner of Lake Garda). Rovereto is the main city of the Vallagarina district.

The town is located at the southern edge of the Italian Alps, near the Dolomites. It is bordered by Monte Cengialto (686 m or 2,251 feet above sea level) to the east.

== Main sights ==
- The Italian War museum (Museo Storico Italiano della Guerra) is located inside the castle. The Italian War Museum was founded in 1921 in remembrance of the First World War and in it are preserved arms and documents relating to wars from the 16th to the 20th centuries.
- The mighty bell Maria Dolens, one of the largest outside Russia and East Asia, and the second-largest swinging bell in the world after the St. Peter's Bell of the Cologne Cathedral. Maria Dolens ("the grieving Virgin Mary") was built under the inspiration of a local priest, between 1918 and 1925, to commemorate the fallen in all wars, and to this day it sounds for the dead every day. Originally a patriotic rather than pacifist idea, it is today regarded as a shrine to peace.
- MART, the Museum of Modern and Contemporary Art of Trento and Rovereto offers temporary exhibitions, and educational activities, and has a remarkable permanent collection.
- The Casa d'Arte Futurista Depero, Italy's only museum dedicated to the Futurist movement, containing 3,000 objects. The Casa d'Arte Futurista Depero is one of MART's venues. Closed for many years for extensive refurbishment, it reopened in 2009.

In the area of Lavini di Marco footprints of dinosaurs have been found. The species have been identified as the herbivorous Camptosaurus and carnivorous Dilophosaurus.

Marco also hosts a large landslide which was mentioned by Dante Alighieri in his Divina Commedia: "Qual è quella ruina che nel fianco di qua da Trento l'Adice percosse, o per tremoto o per sostegno manco" (Inferno, canto XII).

== Economy ==
In the past, Rovereto was an important centre for the manufacture of silk fabrics. Currently, wine, rubber, chocolate, glasses and coffee are the town's main businesses.

Rovereto is the birthplace (1941) of Sferoflex eyeglasses, now taken over by Luxottica. Other relevant companies located in Rovereto are Marangoni Pneumatici, Sandoz Industrial Products S.p.A., Cioccolato Cisa, and Metalsistem. Rovereto is also home to Pama S.p.A. machine tool builder.

== Transport ==
Rovereto railway station, opened in 1859, forms part of the Brenner railway, which links Verona with Innsbruck.

== People ==
- Gaspare Antonio Cavalcabò Baroni (1682–1759) Baroque painter
- Girolamo Tartarotti (born 1706), author
- Bianca Laura Saibante (1723–1797), poet
- Giuseppe Tomaselli (1758–1836), operatic tenor
- Giacomo Gotifredo Ferrari (1763–1842), musician
- Antonio Rosmini-Serbati (1797–1855), priest, philosopher and founder of the Institute of Charity (The Rosminians)
- Gustavo Venturi (1830–1898), a bryologist whose herbarium is now kept at the Museo Tridentino di Scienze Naturali in Trento.
- Riccardo Zandonai (born 1883), composer
- Fortunato Depero (1892–1960), artist
- Fausto Melotti (1901–1986), artist and sculptor
- Carlo Belli (1901–1991), artist and writer
- Ivo Modena (born 1929), physics researcher
- Maria Pia Gardini (1936–2012), entrepreneur and critic of Scientology
- Franco Bonisolli (1938–2003), Italian operatic tenor
- Valerio Fioravanti (born 1958), founder of the terrorist group Nuclei Armati Rivoluzionari
- Paolo Seganti (born 20 May 1965), actor, author

=== Sport ===
- Silvano Bresadola (1906–2002), football player
- Armando Aste (born 1926), influential Italian alpinist of the postwar period
- Marco Martinelli (born 1965), a former volleyball player who earned 155 caps for the Italy men's national volleyball team
- Elena Tonetta (born 1988), archer and 2005 Junior European Champion
- Massimo Parziani (born 1992), Motorcycle racer
- Cesare Benedetti (born 1987), professional cyclist.
- Lara Naki Gutmann (born 2002), figure skater

== Twin towns and sister cities ==
Rovereto is twinned with:

- Bento Gonçalves, Brazil
- Bezerros, Brazil. (Since 2023)
- Dolní Dobrouč, Czech Republic
- Forchheim, Germany
- Kufstein, Austria

== See also ==
- Vallagarina (district)
- List of Podestà of Rovereto
