= Brankica =

Brankica is a Serbian feminine name. It is a diminutive of the name Branka.

== Notable people named Brankica ==
- Brankica Mihajlović, Serbian volleyball player
- Brankica Stanković, Serbian journalist
