= Bianca Bianchi =

Bianca Bianchi may refer to:

- Bianca Bianchi (politician) (1914–2000), Italian teacher, socialist politician, feminist, and writer
- Bertha Schwarz (1855–1947), German opera singer who used the stage name Bianca Bianchi

== See also ==
- Bianco Bianchi (1917–1997), Italian Olympic cyclist
