= Branca =

- Gender: Female

Origin
- Meaning: "White"

Other names
- Related names: Blanche, Bianca, Blanca

Branca is a feminine given name. It means "white" in Portuguese (it is a Portuguese cognate of the name Blanche).

== People with the surname ==
- Infanta Branca, Lady of Guadalajara (1192–1240), Portuguese royal
- Infanta Branca of Portugal (1259–1321), Portuguese nun
- Giovanni Branca (1571–1645), Italian architect
- Wilhelm von Branca (born 1844), German paleontologist and vulcanologist
- Giulio Branca (1851–1926), Italian sculptor
- Dona Branca (1902–1992), Portuguese con artist
- Angelo Branca (1903–1984), Canadian judge
- Vittore Branca (1913–2004), Italian philologist and critic
- Toni Branca (1916–1985), Swiss racing driver
- Ralph Branca (1926–2016), American baseball player
- Glenn Branca (1948–2018), American composer
- John Branca (born 1950), American lawyer
- Daniel Branca (1951–2005), Argentine artist
- Eliseo Branca (born 1957), Argentine rugby player
- Marco Branca (born 1965), Italian football player

== See also ==
- Branka, a feminine given name
- Bianca, a feminine given name
- Bianka, a feminine given name
- Blanca (given name), a feminine given name
- Blanka (given name), a feminine given name
