= Silvano Bresadola =

Italian footballer

Personal information
- Date of birth: 15 June 1906
- Place of birth: Rovereto, Italy
- Date of death: 2002 (aged 95–96)
- Position: Midfielder

Senior career*
Years	Team	Apps	(Gls)
1924–1925	U.S. Rovereto		
1925–1926	Trento		
1926–1929	U.S. Rovereto		
1929–1931	Esperia Trieste		
1931–1932	Ambrosiana-Inter	7	(0)
1932–1934	Pavia	35	(0)
1934–1938	U.S. Rovereto		
Total		42+	(0+)
- * Club domestic league appearances and goals

Silvano Bresadola (15 June 1906 – 2002) was an Italian footballer who played as a midfielder.

He played one season in Serie A, appearing seven times for Ambrosiana-Inter in 1931–32.
