= Branka Nevistić =

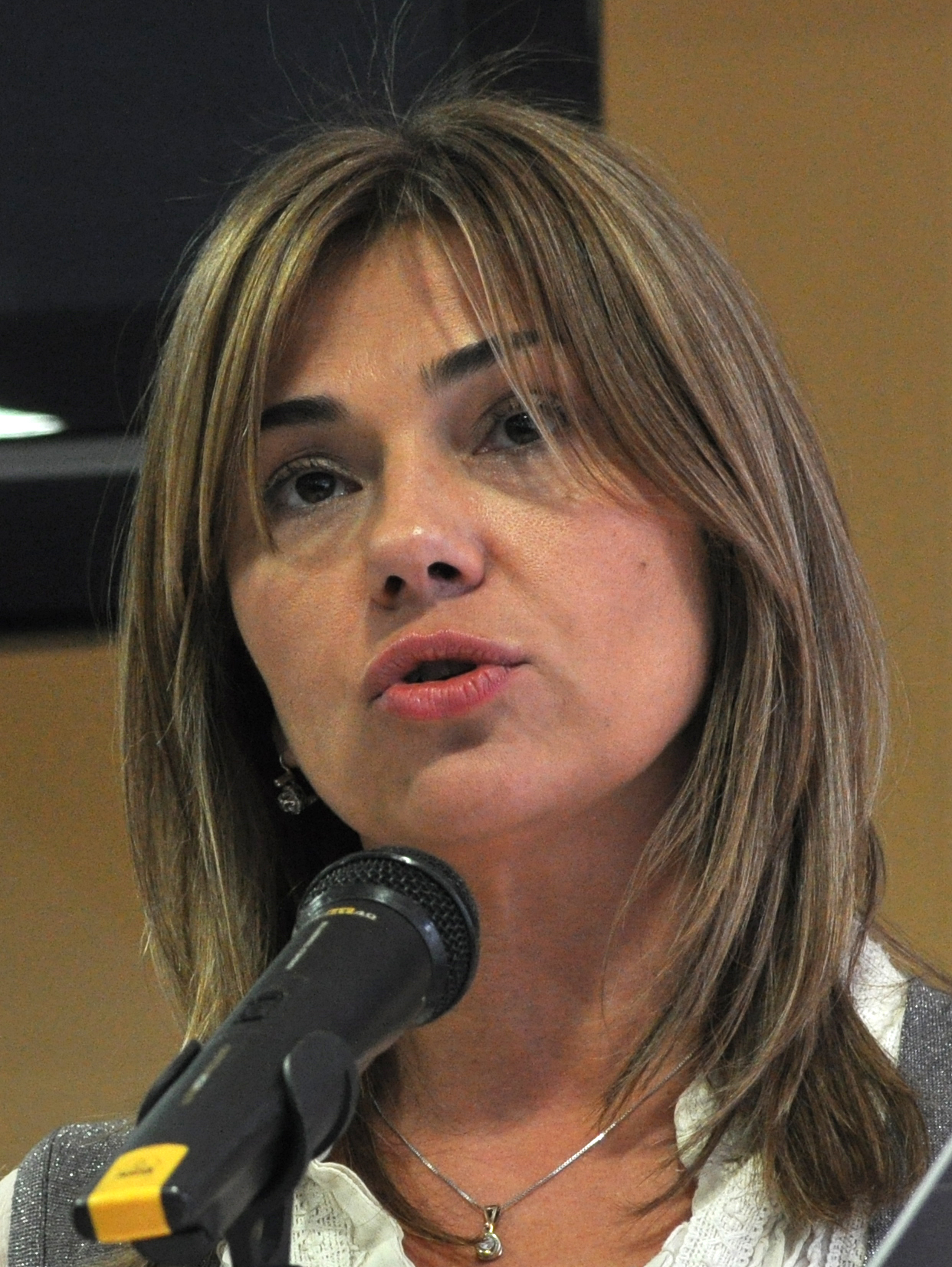
Nevistić in February 2010

Branka Nevistić (born 12 November 1968 in Duvno, SR Bosnia-Herzegovina, SFR Yugoslavia) is a Serbian television presenter and journalist.

After moving to capital Belgrade at the age of 18, she started her journalism career in 1995 at now defunct BKTV. After spending almost an entire decade there she switched over to public broadcaster RTS in 2004 where initially she anchored the central daily newscast Dnevnik 2.

In fall 2005, she was on the move again, this time to RTV Pink where she hosted the Serbian version of political talk/game show Piramida. After doing that for two seasons, she switched to the Montenegrin version of the same show, which she did for 27 episodes at TV Atlas. Simultaneously, from mid June 2007 until early November 2008 she wrote a weekly column for Press daily newspaper.

Eventually, in autumn 2008, she announced her return to old stomping grounds RTS where she was supposed to develop a show for the 2008/09 television season, however nothing came of that.

Finally, in mid-2010 she returned to television hosting a talk show Časna reč that premiered on 12 May 2010 on TV Košava. The programme went off the air quickly by summer 2010. Ahead of the 2010–11 TV season, Nevistić was announced as the weekend newscast anchor at Prva srpska televizija. She left the network in November 2011 amid controversy.

== Personal ==
She has a son from a relationship with former professional basketball player Momčilo Lavrnić.
