= Dag Frogner =

Norwegian painter and scenographer (born 1929)

Dag Frogner (29 May 1929 – 5 March 2015) was a Norwegian painter and scenographer.

He was born in Modum, and was educated at the Norwegian National Academy of Craft and Art Industry and the Norwegian National Academy of Fine Arts. He has worked as scenic designer at the theatres Folketeatret, Oslo Nye Teater, Det Norske Teatret, Den Nationale Scene, Riksteatret, Trøndelag Teater and Rogaland Teater. He also worked for NRK for 25 years, from the start of its television era, including for Fjernsynsteatret.

He was married to textile artist Åse Frogner from 1957, and to Kirsten Grønseth from 1993.

Frogner died on 5 March 2015.

== Honours ==
- Prix Italia
