= Grenzlandtheater Aachen =

Theatre in Aachen, Germany

Coordinates: 50.773559°N 6.08878°E

Grenzlandtheater Aachen is a theater in Aachen, North Rhine-Westphalia, Germany founded by actor Kurt Sieder (1899–1964) in 1950.
