= Bianca Rowland =

American volleyball player (born 1990)

Personal information
- Nationality: American
- Born: September 5, 1990 (age 36); Everett (Washington)
- Height: 183 cm (6 ft 0 in)
- Weight: 70 kg (154 lb)
- Spike: 290 cm (114 in)
- Block: 280 cm (110 in)
- Education: Uni. of Washington

Volleyball information
- Position: Centre
- Current club: (France) Vannes VB
- Number: 5

Career
Years	Teams
2012-2013	(Switzerland) Hôtel Cristal VFM
2013-2014	(Germany) VolleyStars
2014-2015	Vannes VB

National team
USA

Bianca Rowland is an American volleyball player, born September 5, 1990 in Everett (Washington). She measures 1.83 metres (6 ft 0 in) and plays centre.

== Clubs ==
Club	From	To
(United States) University of Washington	2008-2009	2010-2011
(Switzerland) VB Franches-Montagnes	2012-2013	2012-2013
(Germany) VolleyStars Thüringen	2013-2014	2013-2014
(France) Vannes Volley-Ball	2014-2015	…

== Honours ==
- German Cup
  - Finalist : 2014.

== See also ==
- United States women's national volleyball team
