= Bianca Garavelli =

Italian writer and literary critic (1958–2021)

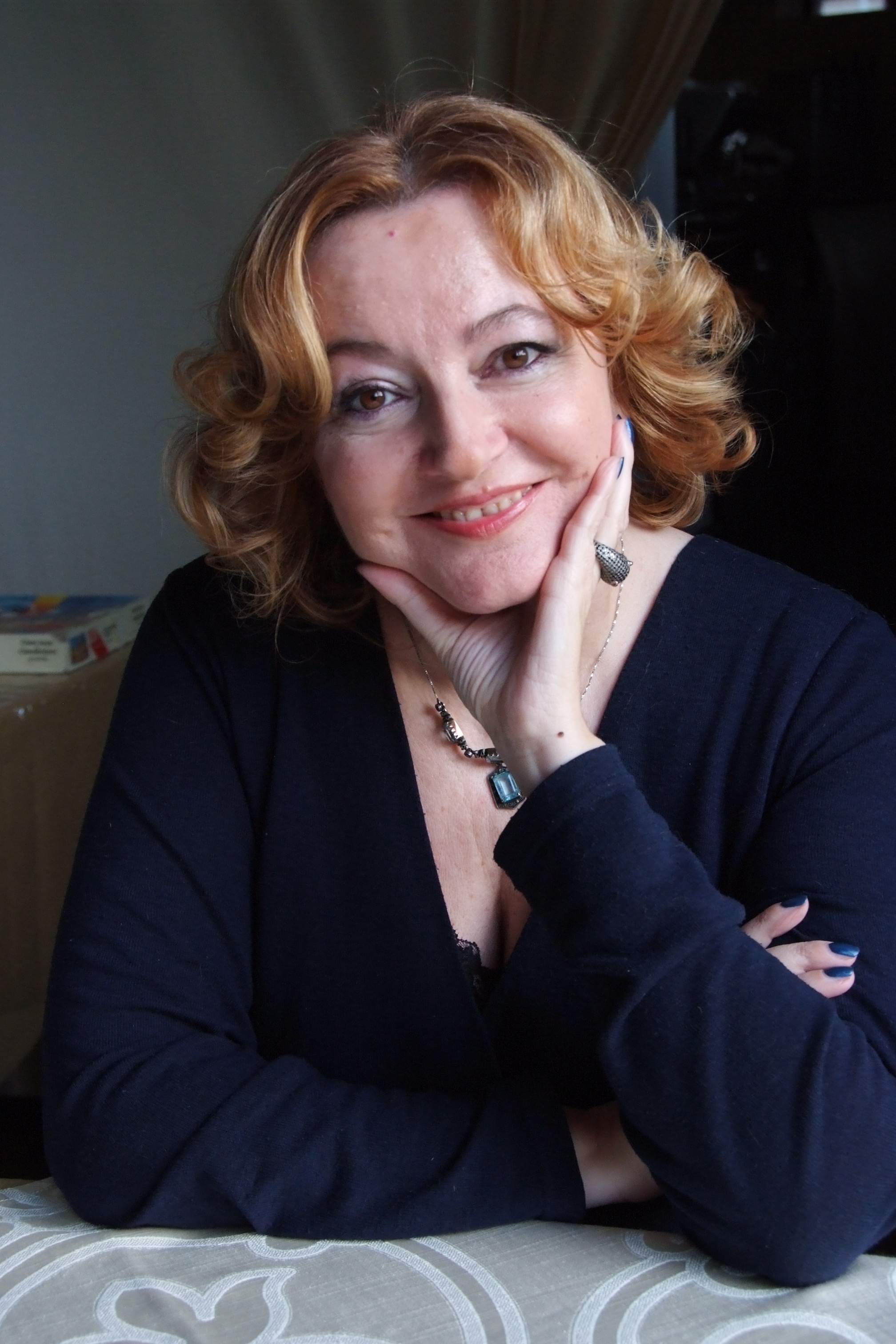
Bianca Garavelli

Bianca Garavelli (23 August 1958 – 29 December 2021) was an Italian writer and literary critic known for her work on the writings of Dante Alighieri. She died on 29 December 2021, at the age of 63.
