= Souvenir napoléonien =

The Souvenir napoléonien, founded in 1937, is an association which promotes the historical study of the Napoleonic era. Its full name is the Société française d'histoire napoléonienne.

== Background ==
First established in the year 1937 by Eugénie Gal, a great-great-niece of Marshal Suchet, the Souvenir napoléonien was recognized as a benevolent association by a French decree dated 5 November 1982. The society studies and makes known the history of the First and Second French Empires, from the time of the French Revolution, the imperial family, and the institutions, places, and people who were part of this history. For this purpose, it organizes a wide variety of events, such as conferences, seminars, study visits, and commemorations, at the international, national and regional levels, both in France and abroad.

The society works closely with the Fondation Napoléon, from which it receives financial support for the publication of its magazine, the Revue du souvenir napoléonien.

== Structure ==
The officers of the Souvenir napoléonien are a President, an Honorary President, three Vice-Presidents, a Treasurer and a Deputy Treasurer. The governing body is called the Steering Committee. There is also a General Secretary and an editor-in-chief of the magazine.

In France and abroad, delegates are tasked with the organization of venues and conferences.

=== Delegations in France ===
Nord-Pas-de-Calais, Picardy, Normandy, Brittany, Paris and Île-de-France, Champagne-Ardenne, Lorraine, Alsace, Loire Valley, Berry, Burgundy, Franche-Comté, Poitou-Charentes, Limousin, Auvergne, Lyonnais, Dauphiné-Savoie, Aquitaine, Midi-Pyrénées, Languedoc-Roussillon, Provence-Alpes-Côte d'Azur, Nice Alpes-Maritimes, and Corsica.

=== Delegations abroad ===
Northern Italy, Rome and Central Italy, Belgium, Sweden and Switzerland. In addition, there are overseas correspondents for Montreal, Bogotá, Vienna, and the United Kingdom.

== Library ==
The Souvenir napoléonien has a library which was initially established with about five hundred books from the library of Baron Jean Thiry, bequeathed to the society by the historian's children. This library is constantly expanded by donations from the society's members and from authors and publishers, as well as by purchases, and is available for the use of members of the association and of students in a building at 82 rue de Monceau, Paris.

The library contains the archive of the Revue du Souvenir napoléonien magazine, starting from issue number 233 of December 1967.

== The Revue du Souvenir napoléonien ==
Many historians, including Thierry Lentz, Michel Wilmot, Maurice Bernard-Catinat, Jacques-Olivier Boudon, and Jean Étèvenaux, have contributed to the society's magazine Revue du Souvenir napoléonien on topics relating to the Napoleonic era, from the Directoire to the Second French Empire.
