= Françoise-Charlotte de Senneterre Ménétou =

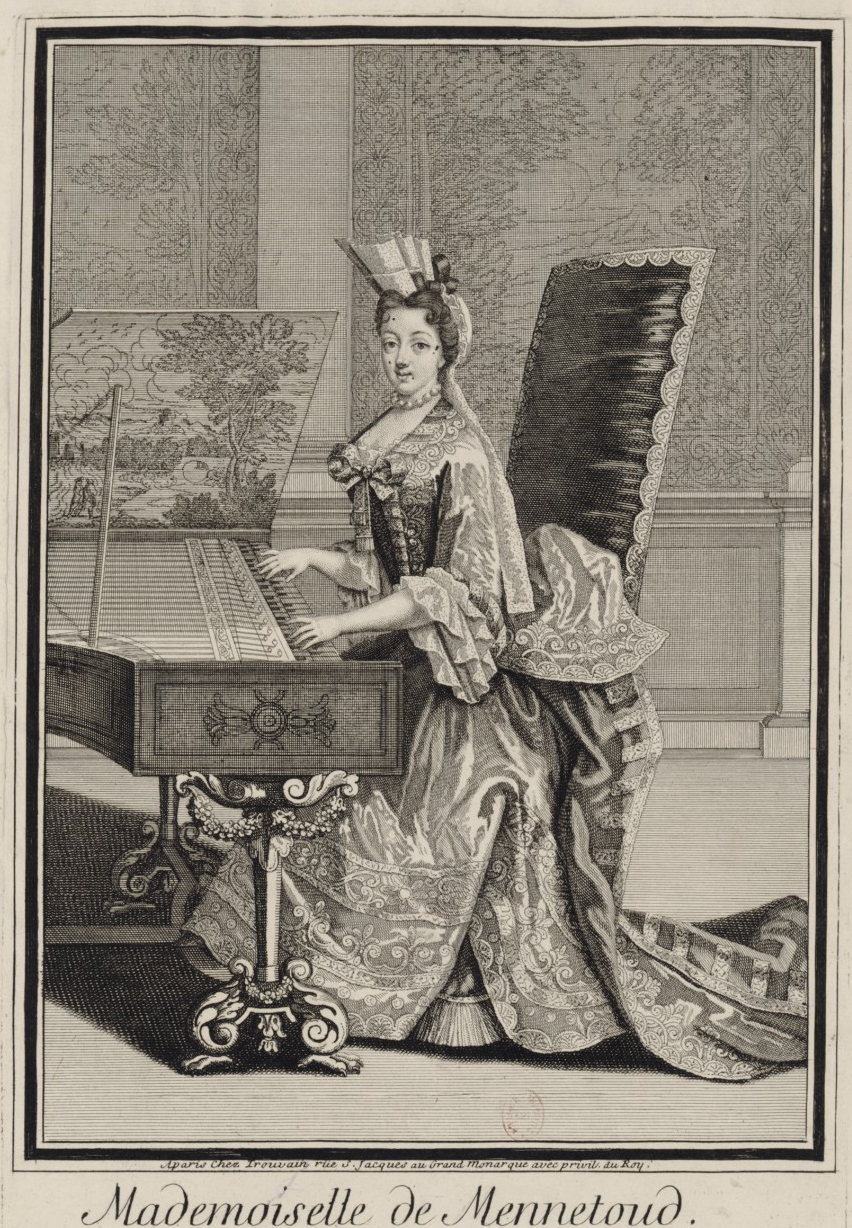
Mennetoud

Françoise-Charlotte de Senneterre Ménétou (1679 – 4 November 1745) was a French harpsichordist and composer.

== Biography ==
Françoise-Charlotte Ménétou was born into an aristocratic family in 1679 of parents Henri François de Saint-Nectaire, Duc de La Ferté-Sennecterre (1657–1703), and Isabelle Gabrielle Marie Angélique de La Mothe-Houdancourt. She married François Gabriel Thibault de La Carte, Marquis de la Ferté on 28 July 1698 and her son was Louis Philippe Thibault de La Carte, Marquis de La Ferté-Senneterre (1699–1780). She died at Château de la Ferté at age 66.

Françoise-Charlotte Ménétou performed before King Louis XIV at the age of nine. In 1691 she became the youngest female composer to have her works issued by the royal printer, Christophe Ballard. The historical significance of her manuscript was first noted in 1970 in an article by Alan Curtis.

== Works ==
De Senneterre Ménétou composed for voice and harpsichord. Selected works include:

- Aymez DeSornaus for voice and harpsichord
- De Toutes Les Heures for voice and harpsichord
- Folies D'espagne for harpsichord
- Gavottes for harpsichord
- J'ay pour Tous Bien une Musette for voice and harpsichord
- Menuete for harpsichord
- Les Olivettes for harpsichord
- Sans Crainte Dans nos Praires for voice and harpsichord
