= Bianca Tognocchi =

Italian operatic soprano

- Born: Italy
- Education: Milan Conservatory
- Occupation: Operatic soprano
- Website: www.biancatognocchi.com

Bianca Tognocchi is an Italian operatic soprano. Based at the Oper Frankfurt from 2020, she appeared as Despina in Mozart's Così fan tutte in 2025.

== Life and career ==
Tognocchi was born in Como. She studied voice at the Milan Conservatory. She won a Special Prize at the 2017 Renata Tebaldi Competition.

She performed with OperaLombardia from 2010, in roles including Olympia in Offenbach's Les contes d'Hoffmann, Giulia in Rossini's La scala di seta, Ninetta ikn Mozart's La finta semplice. She became a member of the Leipzig Opera in 2018, where she performed as Gilda in Verdi's Rigoletto, as the Voice of the Forest Bird in Wagner's Siegfried, in the title role of Donizetti's Lucia di Lammermoor, as Frasquita in Bizet's Carmen and Adina in Donizetti's L'elisir d'amore. After a performance as Gilda at the Oper Frankfurt in 2019, she joined the company's ensemble with the 2020/21 season, where her roles have included Mozart's Susanna in Le nozze di Figaro and Blonde in Die Entführung aus dem Serail, Norina in Donizetti's Don Pasquale, Olga Sukarew and Madame Brillante in Giordano's Fedora, the title role in Cimarosa's L'Italiana in Londra, Beauté in Magnard's Guercœur and Bianca in Rossini's Bianca e Falliero. Tognocchi appeared as Despina in Mozart's Così fan tutte in the opening performance of the 2025/26 season at the Oper Frankfurt, conducted by Thomas Guggeis and directed by Mariame Clément.
