= Bianca Laura Saibante =

Italian poet and playwright

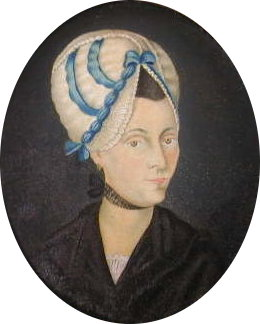
Portrait of Bianca Laura Saibante by Clementino Tomitano

Bianca Laura Saibante (1723–1797) was an 18th-century Italian poet and playwright. Born into a wealthy family, she is considered one of the founders of the Accademia Roveretana degli Agiati in Rovereto.

== Biography ==
Bianca was born on 17 May 1723 to Francesca Caterina Sbardellati and Girolamo Saibante in Rovereto, Italy. Her father was a successful merchant, and the Saibante family were considered part of the Italian nobility. The family was an important part of Rovereto high society, and often hosted local leaders and intellectuals at their residence; sources describe the Saibante home as being akin to a literary salon. Bianca was active in her family's activities, and in her youth was part of a literary circle her family was affiliated with.

In 1750 Bianca, Giuseppe Valeriano Vannetti (an esquire and knight), local writer Girolamo Tartarotti, and several other prominent residents of Rovereto announced their intent to turn the Saibantes' literary circle into a proper academy. The new institution—based on the Accademia degli Arcadi in Rome—was concerned with stimulating the intellectual environment in Rovereto, which Bianca's co-founder Tartarotti lamented was “only abundant in silk, cocoons and silkworms”. The new academy was named the Accademia Roveretana degli Agiati di Scienze, Lettere ed Arti, and was intended to be accessible to both the middle and upper classes. Bianca—who used the pseudonym Atalia Sabina Canburi—contributed heavily to the academy's successes; she corresponded with other European intellectuals, worked to promote the mission of the academy in Rovereto, and personally designed the academy's emblem.

=== Personal life ===
In 1754, Bianca married Giuseppe Valeriano Vannetti (1719-1764), a fellow co-founder of the Accademia Roveretana. She gave birth to a son, Clementino Vannetti, in 1755. Her husband died in 1764, and Bianca herself died in Rovereto in 1797.
