= Bianca Babb =

Pioneer woman and captive of Native Americans (1856–1950)

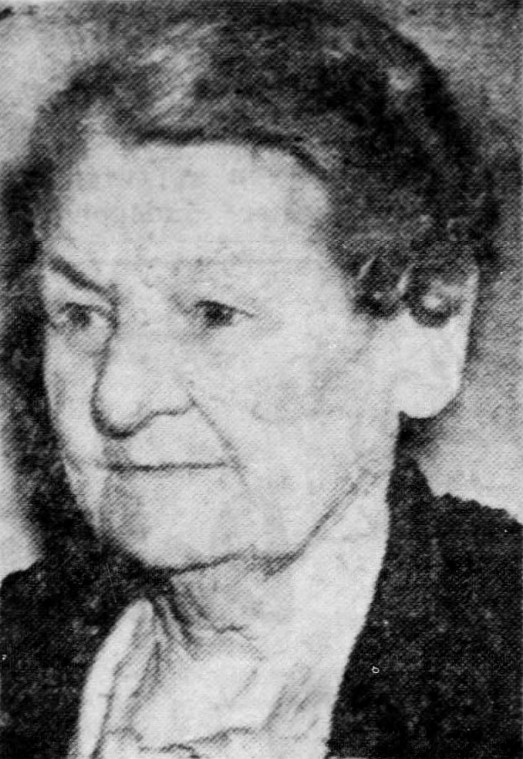
- Babb c. 1950
- Born: August 26, 1856; Lecompton, Kansas Territory, U.S.
- Died: April 13, 1950 (aged 93); Denton, Texas, U.S.
- Occupation: Pioneer woman
- Known for: Captivity among the Comanche
- Spouse: Jefferson Davis Bell (m. 1882; died 1934)
- Relatives: Theodore "Dot" Babb (brother)

Bianca Babb (August 26, 1856 – April 13, 1950) was an American pioneer woman and former captive of the Comanche people. As a child, she was taken captive during a Comanche raid on her family's homestead in Wise County, Texas, in 1866. Babb spent seven months living among the Comanches before being ransomed and returned to her father in 1867. She later wrote a memoir that provided a rare first-person account from the perspective of a young female captive, offering insights into Comanche culture and life on the Southern Plains frontier of the late 19th century.

== Early life, capture, and captivity ==
Bianca Babb, originally named Bianca Louella and also known as Bankuella, Bianca Babb Bell, or simply Banc, was born on August 26, 1856, during her family's journey from Wisconsin to Texas, in a covered wagon near Lecompton, Kansas. Her parents, John S. Babb and Isabel A. Babb, were settlers and ranchers. In her formative years, Bianca resided with her family in a cabin near present-day Chico in Wise County, Texas. The region, situated on the outskirts of non–Native American settlements, was often fraught with tensions and conflicts between settlers and indigenous tribes, particularly the Comanche people who dominated the area.

On September 14, 1866, a band of Nokoni Comanches, led by Persummy, raided the Babbs' cabin. Bianca's father and eldest brother were away at the time, leaving her mother, Isabel Babb, and Bianca herself, along with her siblings, vulnerable to the attack. Isabel Babb was stabbed or shot five times, scalped alive, and left to die with her infant child still breastfeeding, while Bianca, along with her brother Theodore Adolphus ("Dot") and a young houseguest named Sarah Jane Luster, were captured by the Comanches.

Comanche warriors, renowned for their exceptional horsemanship, were adept at traversing long distances without sustenance. Racing westward through the night, they swiftly crossed the Little Wichita River close to modern-day Henrietta. The journey proved arduous for the captives, who endured a relentless ride spanning at least 50 miles (80 km) without pause, eventually halting at 11 a.m. the following day near Holiday Creek. There, they prepared and consumed the flesh of a steer mauled by wolves. Bianca, consumed by hunger, pleaded for raw meat. Exhausted and numb, she sat amidst her own filth, earning the disparaging moniker "stinks when walks" from her captors.

After the young houseguest, who had been raped, escaped with Dot's help, the warriors beat the boy and prepared to kill him. The siblings defied execution, earning the warriors' respect, hence they allowed her brother to live. Bianca was separated from her brother. The warrior Kerno who captured her gave Bianca as a foster daughter to his widowed sister Tekwashana. For seven months in 1866–1867, Bianca lived immersed in traditional Comanche society. While being forced to gather wood and haul water, she learned skills like camp setup, swimming, and cultural practices like ear-piercing from her adoptive mother. Tekwashana also darkened Bianca's blonde hair. The band followed a nomadic lifestyle, frequently relocating camps across the Oklahoma–Texas panhandle region, allowing Bianca to experience the daily routines, customs, and way of life among the Comanches firsthand.

After Bianca's capture, her father John Babb joined efforts by frontiersmen and Native allies to search for his missing children. Around April 1867, Jacob J. Sturm, a civilian agent from Fort Arbuckle, located Bianca and secured her ransom and release from the Comanches for US$333 (roughly $7,671 today). Sturm then brought Bianca to the fort. Despite her months living with the tribe, Bianca returned willingly to her family. Most children suffered from Stockholm syndrome after such an ordeal and did not want to return. In June 1867, her brother Dot was also ransomed for $210 (roughly $4,837 today), with articles of clothing worth $23.75, and released back to their father.

== Later years and memoir ==
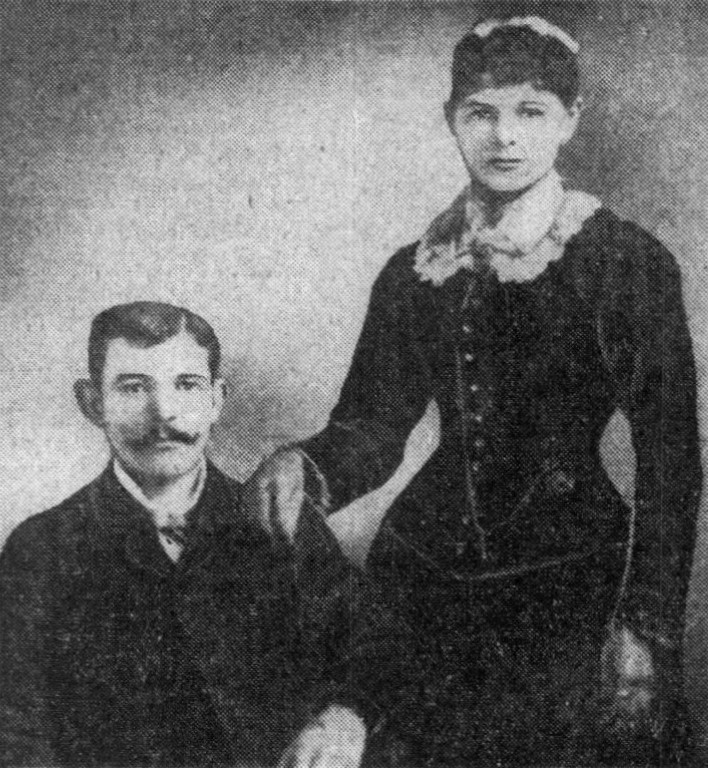
Mr. and Mrs. J. D. Bell (the former Bianca Babb), in their wedding finery, 1882

The Babbs initially relocated to Reedsburg, Wisconsin, after the ordeal, though Bianca later returned to Texas in 1881. On June 25, 1882, she married Jefferson Davis Bell, an abstractor of land titles. Bianca attributed her wanderlust and frequent family relocations between various North Texas towns like Henrietta, Denton, Greenville, as well as periods in California and New Mexico, to her nomadic experiences living with the Comanches.

From 1897 to 1900, the former Kiowa–Comanche–Apache reservation lands were divided into household allotments. As a former adoptee, Bianca filed a claim seeking her own allotment and restitution for losses in the 1866 raid, including her mother's death. Though she revisited the reservation and had supportive testimonies from Comanche friends, her allotment claim was rejected.

In the 1920s, Bianca wrote an unpublished memoir manuscript recounting her seven months living among the Comanches as a child captive. While circulated in typescript form, it did not receive wide publication during her lifetime.

Unlike her brother Theodore "Dot" Babb who published his own memoirs to fame, Bianca did not widely publicize her remarkable childhood experiences living among the Comanches when interviewed by journalists later in life. She was widowed in 1934 after over 50 years of marriage. Bianca Babb died on April 13, 1950, in Denton, Texas, at age 93, recognized as the final surviving American to have been adopted into a Plains Indian tribe as a child captive.

=== Scholarly reception ===
Bianca Babb's unpublished memoir manuscript has received scholarly attention as a significant primary source captivity narrative. While the captivity narrative was a popular literary genre in 19th-century America, many examples were sensationalized accounts of questionable authenticity. In contrast, Babb's work is viewed by researchers as a credible and insightful first-person perspective.

The memoir provides one of the few detailed accounts from the viewpoint of a juvenile female captive adopted into a Plains Indian tribe, differing from the predominant narratives focused on adolescent male captive experiences assimilating into warrior cultures. Babb's recollections center on intimate depictions of domestic life, material culture, and survival skills learned while immersed in traditional Comanche society.

Having acquired fluency in the Comanche language during childhood, Babb demonstrated an ethnographic eye for cultural details in her descriptions of practices like kinship systems, religious ceremonies, and subsistence activities. Scholars have corroborated many of her observations against other historical and anthropological sources from this era.

Despite her hardships, Babb painted a sympathetic picture of the Comanches in her memoir, describing her time among them as feeling like "every day seemed to be a holiday".

== Sources ==
=== Books ===
- Gelo, Daniel J. (October 2007). "Babb, Bianca". American National Biography. New York: Oxford University Press. doi:10.1093/anb/9780198606697.article.2001884. (subscription required)
- Tate, Michael L. (1966). Winfrey, Dorman H.; James M., Day (eds.). The Indian Papers of Texas and the Southwest 1825-1916. Vol. IV. Austin, Texas: Texas State Historical Association.

=== Journals ===
- TSHA (2003). Tyler, Ron (ed.). "Every Day Seemed to Be a Holiday: The Captivity of Bianca Babb". The Southwestern Historical Quarterly. 107. Texas State Historical Association: 35–48.
