= Bianca Rantala =

Finnish and Estonian composer and band leader (born 1999)

- Born: Kristina Bianca Rantala; 5 February 1999 (age 27); Rauma, Finland
- Origin: Võro, Estonia
- Occupations: Composer, band leader
- Years active: 2020–present

Kristina Bianca Rantala (born 5 February 1999) is an Estonian and Finnish musician, composer and conductor.

She is a singer, keyboardist, composer, arranger, bandleader and teacher of singing, specializing in jazz and big band music.

In autumn 2026 and spring 2027, Rantala will be UMO's composer-in-residence. UMO describes her as follows:

Rantala is known for her bold and emotionally charged musical expression, which moves effortlessly between different genres, combining intelligence and playfulness, and building a bridge between jazz and contemporary music.

She has composed for various ensembles, small ensembles, choirs and symphony orchestras, and has conducted several big bands in Estonia and acted as a guest conductor in various countries. She has received several awards as both a composer and a singer. She was awarded the Composer of the Year award at the Estonian Jazz Gala.

In Finland, she has performed as part of his own quintet, the Bianca Rantala Quintet. Its musicians are:

- Bianca Rantala, vocals, piano, compositions
- Jonas Metsäkylä, guitar
- Sami Leponiemi, wind instruments
- Okko Saastamoinen, drums
- Mikael Saastamoinen, bass

== Education ==
Rantala has studied classical piano and singing in Estonia at the music schools of Võru, Räpina and Põlva.

In 2020, she graduated from the Georg Ots Music School in Tallinn, Estonia, with a major in rhythmic music instruments (piano). She then studied music production and jazz composition at the Metropolia University of Applied Sciences in Finland.

In 2025, she began her master's studies in composition at the Frankfurt University of Music and Performing Arts in Germany and the Sibelius Academy Jazz Department in Finland.

== Work and music projects ==
In 2021, Rantala was selected as a composer for the international "European Composers" program in Cologne, Germany (as one of five scholarship recipients).

In 2026, she participated in a summer residency program at the jazz club Philly Joe's in Tallinn, where she presented her composition and music-making styles by giving concerts with a new programme and a different instrumental line-up every week in August.

In January 2026, Rantala was selected as the composer-in-residence of the Finnish professional jazz orchestra UMO Helsinki Jazz Orchestra for the 2026–2027 season. This means that during this period, she will compose new commissioned works for the orchestra that will enrich the UMO repertoire, and will also participate in the orchestra's artistic curation as a composer.

She has taught rhythmic music and vocal ensembles at the Georg Ots Music School in Tallinn and directed vocal ensembles, the Georg Ots Music School Big Band and the Tallinn University of Technology Big Band. She has taught children's solo singing at the ETV Lasteekraan music studio.

Since 2019, several of her concerts and performances have also been broadcast on Klassikaaradio.

== Activities as a composer ==
As a composer, Bianca Rantala cultivates modern jazz, which she combines with elements of other genres. She has created musical works and made hundreds of arrangements for many musical groups from choirs to symphony orchestras, including the Tallinn Chamber Orchestra, the Vantaa Pops Orchestra, the Subway Jazz Orchestra, the New Wind Jazz Orchestra, the Conscript Band of the Finnish Defence Forces, the Estonian Dream Big Band and many others.

In April 2024, the opening concert of the Jazzkaar jazz festival featured her new piece "Moral Paradox", in which she herself was the female vocalist, Jukka Eskola the male vocalist and Valter Soosalu conducted the string orchestra.

== Awards ==
- 2016 – Grand Prize Winner of the "Space 2016" Singing Competition (Vilnius, Lithuania)
- 2018, 2019, 2020 – Winner of the Uno Naissoon Composition Competition
- 2020 – Winner of the "Baltic Big Band Composer Contest”
- 2021 – Member of the "European Composers" Program (Cologne, Germany)
- 2023 – Winner of the "Nordic Composer Contest”
- 2025 – Winner of the Jazz Composer of the Year Award
- 2025 – Recipient of the Jaak Sooäär Scholarship

== Personal life ==
Bianca Rantala, whose father is Finnish and mother is Estonian, was born in Rauma, Finland, but spent her childhood in southern Estonia. Her studies (and later work) at the Georg Ots Music School brought her to live in Tallinn. After starting her music studies in Finland in 2020, she has established a second home in Rauma, where she has a creative studio with a grand piano and a recording studio. Rantala is renovating her family's old house in Kulamaa, Rauma, and dreams of farming there. She says she has always been present there, as all the family's holidays have been spent in Rauma.
