= Bianca Mayer =

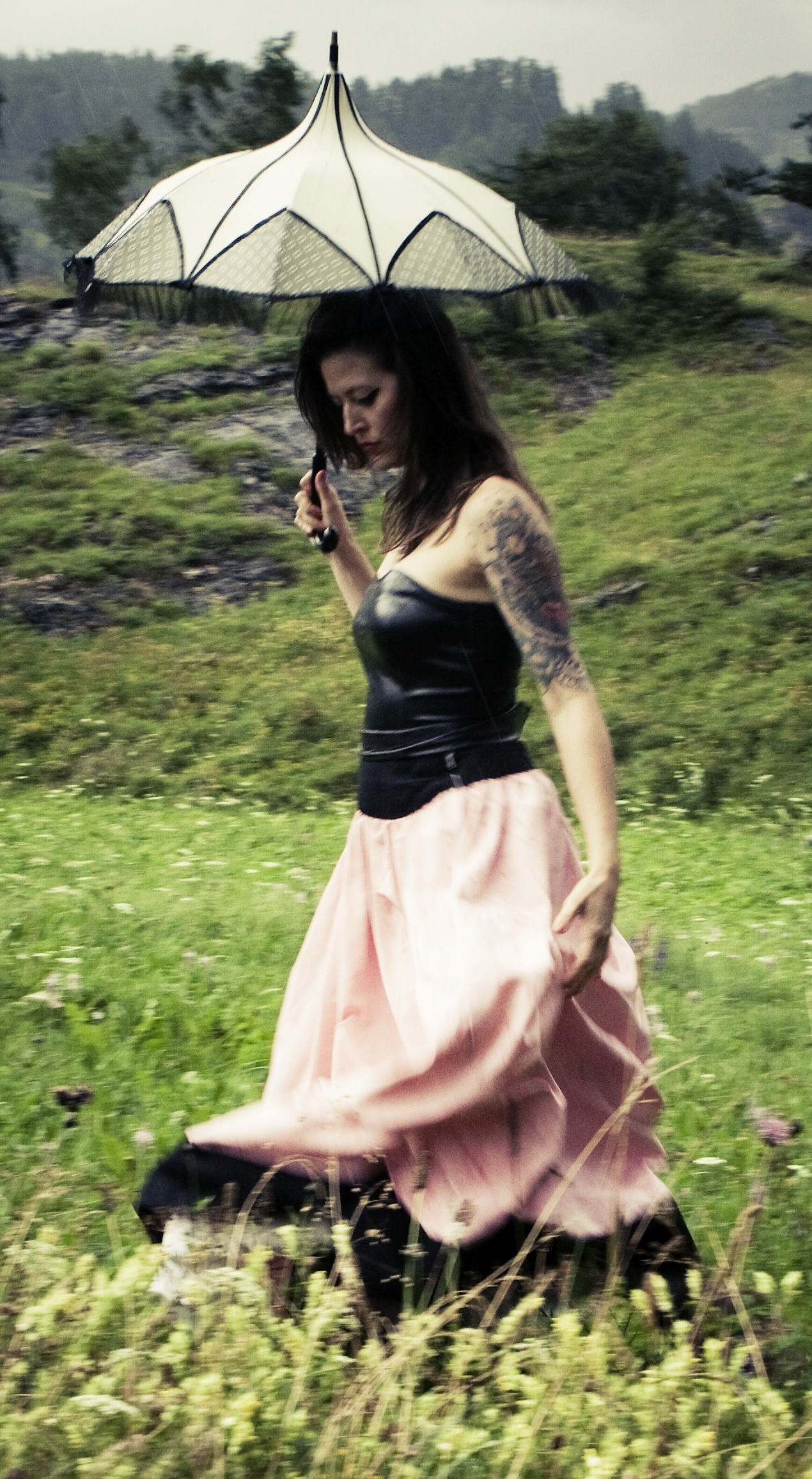
- Bianca Mayer aka Bibi Vaplan, 2012

Background information
- Also known as: Bibi Vaplan
- Born: 17 May 1979 (age 47); Scuol, Graubünden, Switzerland
- Instruments: Guitar, harpsichord, piano
- Works: Üna jada intuorn als Alba da la Clozza, 2009; Ingio vasch? als Bibi Vaplan, 2011; Eu vegn cun tai als Bibi Vaplan, 2011; Sdruogliar als Bibi Vaplan, 2012; Cul vent als Bibi Vaplan, 2015
- Formerly of: Alba da la Clozza

Bibi Vaplan (stage name of Bianca Mayer) (born 17 May 1979) is a Swiss Romansh musician and singer.

== Life ==
Mayer was born in 1979 in Scuol, Graubünden, Switzerland, and grew up in the Engadine valley. She completed her piano studies at the Zurich University of Music (ZHdK) in 2005 with a teaching diploma.

During her studies, she composed for films and theater (including for Vitus), and toward the end of her studies, she began teaching herself. In 2009, Mayer won the Canton of Graubünden's Cultural Promotion Prize.

From 2013 to 2014 she was a radio presenter at Radiotelevisiun Svizra Rumantscha (RTR).

Her first major CD project was "Alba da la Clozza" (2009), featuring Romansh music. Subsequent albums were "Ingio vasch" (Where Are You Going?), "Eu vegn cun tai" (I'm Coming with You), and "Sdruogliar" (Awakening).

With her duet with Carlos Leal, but also with solo pieces such as "Lascha a Mai", Bibi Vaplan has achieved regular airplay on Radio SRF 3.

In 2016, Bibi Vaplan published her first Romansh-German book.

Bibi Vaplan is on tour with the Popcorn Opera in 2025. The tour will stop in St. Moritz, Lucerne, Biel and Bern.

== Music ==
=== Film and theatre music ===
Since 2003, Mayer has been writing compositions for plays and films, working on ten projects from 2004 to 2008. She was a composition assistant for the soundtracks of the films Vitus (Fredi Murer, 2005), I Was a Swiss Banker (Thomas Imbach, 2007) und Happy New Year (Christoph Schaub, 2008), among others.

=== Alba da la Clozza ===
After her studies, Mayer was active as a singer and guitarist in the rock band Alba da la Clozza until 2009.

=== Bibi Vaplan ===
Since 2010, Mayer has developed a quieter and more contemplative musical style. Bibi, va plan! means "Bianca, go slowly!" in her Romansh idiom Vallader dialect and is intended to be a programme. As Bibi Vaplan, she writes the lyrics and the music, sings, and plays the piano and harpsichord. The 2012 album Sdruogiar (German: Awakening) was created in collaboration with the Graubünden Chamber Philharmonic.

Bianca Mayer's lyrics are always about Vallader. The songwriter says about her personal motivation for making music:

"Music helps me escape, understand, feel, or find my feet again when I'm lost in something. If I were completely content, I wouldn't have to make music. I'd rather go for coffee with friends."

— Engadiner Post from 15 November 2012

== Discography ==
=== Albums ===
- Üna jada intuorn as Alba da la Clozza, 2009.
- Ingio vasch? as Bibi Vaplan, 2011.
- Eu vegn cun tai as Bibi Vaplan, 2011.
- Sdruogliar as Bibi Vaplan, 2012.
- Cul vent as Bibi Vaplan, 2015.
- Cler Cler as Bibi Vaplan, 2018.

=== EPs and singles ===
- 60 minuts (Verisun radio) as Bibi Vaplan in 2015.
- Las dumondas (Radio Edit) as Bibi Vaplan in 2015.
- Milli Bels Guottins as Bibi Vaplan in 2017.
- Miss Pompus/Swiss Press Song 18 as Bibi Vaplan in 2018.
- Crazy Popcorn 1 as Bibi Vaplan in 2020.
- Captain Flamingo as Bibi Vaplan in 2021.
- Glüna 3.7 as Bibi Vaplan in 2021.
- Madagascar as Bibi Vaplan in 2022.
- Crazy Popcorn 2 as Bibi Vaplan in 2022.
- Glüna 3.9 as Bibi Vaplan in 2023.
- Culurio as Bibi Vaplan in 2024.
- Edi Plop as Bibi Vaplan in 2025.

== Awards ==
- 2009: Promotional Prize of the Canton of Graubünden.
- 2014: Grant from the Canton of Graubünden.
- 2015: Grant from the Canton of Graubünden.
