= Blanka Wladislaw =

Brazilian chemist (1917–2012)

- Born: 3 June 1917; Warsaw, Congress Poland, Russian Empire
- Died: 26 January 2012 (aged 94); São Paulo, Brazil
- Citizenship: Poland (by birth); Brazil
- Education: University of São Paulo
- Awards: National Order of Scientific Merit; Rheimboldt-Hauptmann Prize
- Scientific career
- Fields: Chemistry
- Thesis: Sobre o comportamento de compostos de enxofre em presença de Níquel de Raney (1948)
- Doctoral advisor: Heinrich Hauptmann

Blanka Wladislaw (born Blanka Wertheim, 3 June 1917 – 26 January 2012) was a Brazilian chemist of Polish-Jewish descent.

== Biography ==
Wladislaw was born Blanka Wertheim on 3 June 1917, in Warsaw, Congress Poland, a part of the Russian Empire. Her family emigrated to Brazil when she was 14, where they have faced great financial difficulty on their arrival in São Paulo. She decided to dedicate herself to her studies in order to enter the University of São Paulo and in 1937 accomplished this, entering the university's Faculty of Philosophy, Sciences and Letters and graduated in 1941. Wladislaw's professional career began when she was hired by Matarazzo Industries (Indústrias Reunidas Francisco Matarazzo), but she was determined to go to graduate school. In 1949, she completed her doctorate with her thesis analyzing the behavior of various sulfur compounds in presesence of Raney nickel catalysts, advisor Heinrich Hauptmann, and joined the Faculty of Philosophy, Sciences, and Letters as an assistant to Hauptmann.

In 1949, she joined the faculty of Organic and Biological Chemistry at the USP to become and became full time assistant professor in 1953. Blanka got a grant from the British government to conduct postdoctoral studies at the Imperial College London on organic electrosynthesis. In the following decade, Wladislaw researched with organic electrochemistry, again with sulfur compounds. Returning to this field of study in 1971, she would at the same time be promoted to become a full time professor at USP's Institute of Chemistry and in 1975 started the University's Department of Fundamental Chemistry.

== Legacy ==
Blanka Wladislaw wrote more than 115 research papers, 171 papers in congress, and directed four Master's dissertations and 24 Doctoral theses. After retiring, she wrote a guide to the teaching of chemistry and remained at the University of São Paulo as a guest teacher.

In 1973, she was elected a full member of the Brazilian Academy of Sciences, Brazilian Association of Chemists, Royal Society of Chemistry (MRSC), and the Brazilian Society for the Advancement of Science. The following year she became a member of the São Paulo Academy of Sciences. For the quality of her work in the field of chemistry, Wladislaw was awarded the Brazilian National Order of Scientific Merit and the Rheimboldt-Hauptmann Award.
