= Bianca Netzler =

Bianca Netzler may refer to:

- Bianca Netzler (cyclist) (born 1974), New Zealand cyclist representing Samoa
- Bianca Netzler (field hockey) (born 1976), Australian field hockey player
