= Bianca Marchesan =

Multimidia artist

Bianca Marchesan (born 1999) is a Brazilian graphic designer and multimedia artist. Her work focuses on the exploration of visual composition, color, form, and materiality, often drawing from her immediate surroundings. Marchesan primarily works with photography and video, incorporating experimental processes into her artistic practice.

She was born in Santa Maria, Rio Grande do Sul, and has developed a body of work that engages with both digital and physical media. Her projects frequently examine the interplay between image, context, and material, and are informed by research-based and process-driven approaches.

Marchesan participated in an artist residency at the Fabrica Research Centre, financed by the Benetton Group, where she explored the use of live coding environments for audiovisual creation. Inspired by analog modular synthesis, her work during the residency investigated concepts such as video feedback, fractals, and audio-responsive systems. These experiments resulted in immersive installations that combined projection and physical elements.

In addition to her visual work, Marchesan has contributed to discourse in design and photography. In 2021, she published the article "The Possibilities for a Designer to Act in Fine Art Photography," which discusses the intersection of graphic design and fine art photography, highlighting potential roles and approaches for designers within the artistic field.
