= Bianca Bianchi (politician) =

Italian politician (1914–2000)

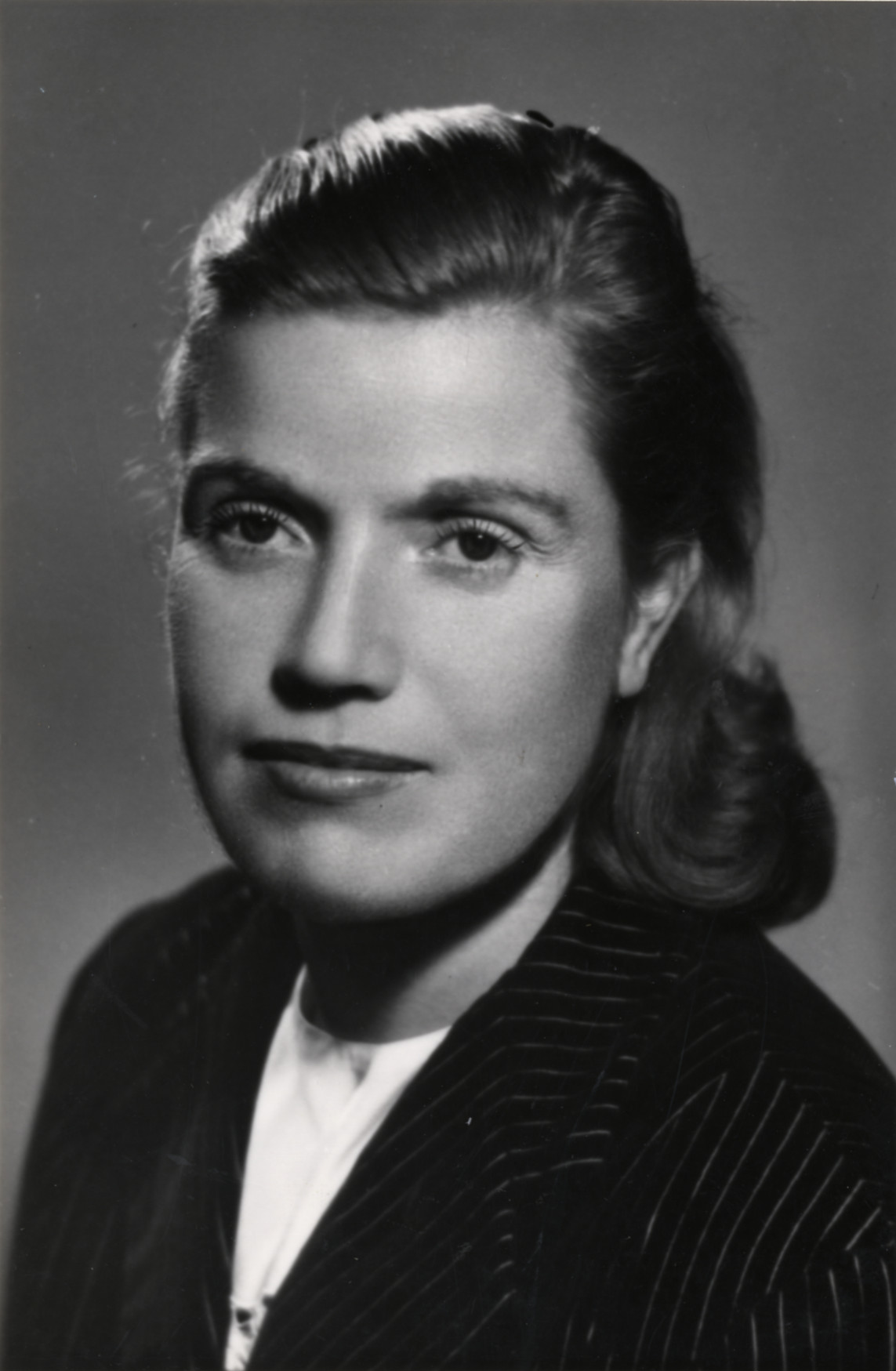
Official portrait, 1948

Bianca Bianchi (31 July 1914 – 9 July 2000) was an Italian teacher, socialist politician, feminist, and writer.

== Biography ==
Bianchi was born in Vicchio, in the province of Florence. Upon the death of her father, the town's blacksmith and an active socialist, she moved to Rufina with her mother's family, then to Florence to continue her studies. She obtained her master's degree in philosophy at the University of Florence before enrolling in the faculty of teaching. As a teacher, she encountered difficulties and obstacles to the point of losing her job, due to disagreements with her superiors regarding her independent way of conducting lessons (for example, her desire not to neglect Jewish culture and civilization). She therefore accepted the opportunity in late 1941 to work as an Italian language teacher in Bulgaria. In June 1942 she returned to Italy and, after a brief period in which she settled again in Rufina, returned to Florence after the fall of Mussolini.

Bianchi took part in the meetings of the Action Party during the latter stages of World War II, helping to distribute anti-fascist leaflets and working to secure arms transport for the partisans. In 1945 she joined the Italian Socialist Party of Proletarian Unity (PSIUP), then led by Giuseppe Saragat and Pietro Nenni, and wrote for various political journals. She was a friend of the socialist activist Angelica Balabanoff, and shared both her aspiration for women's emancipation and her pessimism about the backward position of the country.

In the elections of June 2, 1946, she was among 21 women (out of a total of 556 members) elected to the Italian Constituent Assembly. During her time in the assembly she spoke on issues relating to schools, pensions and employment. When the Palazzo Barberini split occurred within the PSIUP in January 1947, she and Balabanoff followed the anti-communist Saragat group out of the party, helping to form the Italian Socialist Workers' Party (PSLI) in its stead, which five years later was renamed the Italian Democratic Socialist Party (PSDI).

In 1948, she was elected on the Socialist Unity list to represent Sicily in the First Legislature. From the 1950s onwards she devoted herself to the study of educational problems and to the creation of the School of Europe in Monte Senario, a model institute for elementary and middle school children. The ideas that motivated this experiment, in many aspects experimental and avant-garde, are expressed in the essays L'esperienza di un'educazione nuova alla Scuola d'Europa. During these years she also collaborated with the newspaper La Nazione in Florence, writing the "Occhio ai ragazzi" column on educational issues.

From 1970 to 1975 she was a PSDI municipal councillor in Florence, holding the office of deputy mayor. From this time she also devoted herself to writing works of an autobiographical nature. She died in Florence in July 2000.

== Selected publications ==
- (1946) Parole alle donne, la vita nel socialismo, Firenze, Libreria Editrice Socialista
- (1946) Il Partito socialista e la scuola. Discorso pronunciato all'Assemblea costituente nella seduta del 22 luglio 1946, Roma, Tip. della Camera dei deputati
- (1951) Figli di nessuno, Milano
- (1951) "Le donne e l'art.37 [interview]", Noi donne, 45, 18 November 1951, p. 5
- (1952) Il sistema educativo di Maria Montessori, Firenze, Le Monnier
- (1954) Lineamenti di metodologia, Torino, Paravia (Il maestro)
- (1955) "Il fanciullo e il suo mondo di fantasia", in: Problemi della letteratura per l'infanzia in Europa. Atti delle Giornate Europee tenute in Firenze dal 27 al 30 May 1954, Firenze, Centro didattico nazionale di studi e documentazione, p. 44-54
- (1957) "Una nobile figura di studioso e di democratico. Gaetano Pieraccini si è spento a Firenze", Il Resto del carlino, 14 aprile 1957,
- (1960) "Sembra che tutti vedano... Vedono infatti, ma con le mani", La Giustizia, 1 November 1960, p. 3
- (1962) Amicizia per i nostri figli, Roma, Opere nuove (Esperienze didattiche e pedagogiche, 1)
- (1962) L'esperienza di un'educazione nuova alla Scuola d'Europa, Roma, (Esperienze didattiche e pedagogiche, 2)
- (1973) Milinkata, Firenze, Il fauno
- (1974) Il sole nero, Firenze, Il fauno
- (1976) Il tempo del ritorno, Selci Umbro, Stabilimento tipografico Pliniana
- (1981) Al di là del muro, cronaca di un viaggio in Ungheria, Poggibonsi, Lalli (Scrittori italiani contemporanei)
- (1989) "La politica e la donna", in Le donne e la Costituzione, atti del convegno promosso dall'Associazione degli ex-parlamentari, Roma, 22–23 March 1988, Roma, Camera dei deputati, p. 229-231
- (1993) Il colore delle nuvole, Firenze, Firenze libri
- (1994) Principessa, Firenze, Firenze libri
- (1995) Io torno a Vicchio, Firenze, Giorgi & Gambi
- (1997) Vivrò ancora, Firenze, Morgana
- (1998) La storia è memoria, ti racconto la mia vita, Firenze, Giorgi & Gambi (I fiorentinissimi, 1)
- (1999) Il seme della terra, Firenze, Giorgi & Gambi (I fiorentinissimi, 2)
