= Fred D. Lublin =

American medical academic

Fred D. Lublin is an American neurologist and an authority on the treatment of multiple sclerosis. Along with colleagues at the National Multiple Sclerosis Society, his work redefined the clinical course definitions of MS.

Lublin is Director of the Corinne Goldsmith Dickinson Center for Multiple Sclerosis at Mount Sinai Medical Center in New York and Saunders Family Professor of Neurology at Mount Sinai School of Medicine. He sits on the board of directors at both the National Multiple Sclerosis Society and MS Hope for a Cure and has been listed in "Who's Who in Frontiers of Science and Technology" and New York Magazine's "Best Doctors" issue every year since 2000.

According to his employer, in 2004, Lublin secured one of the largest grants ever given for MS research, a $25 million grant from the NIH, to study the benefits of combination drug therapy. He is a consultant to the National Institutes of Health and to pharmaceutical/biotech companies in all phases of drug development in preparation for presentation to the FDA and their advisory panels.

He is the author of numerous scientific publications including Defining the Clinical Course of Multiple Sclerosis: Results of an International Survey, one of the most frequently cited works in the field of multiple sclerosis.

== Biography ==
Lublin was born in 1946 in Philadelphia, Pennsylvania. He graduated from Temple University in 1968 and Jefferson Medical College in 1972. He completed his internship in internal medicine at the Bronx Municipal Hospital, Albert Einstein Medical Center and his residency at the New York Hospital, Cornell Medical Center.

He joined the staff at Mount Sinai Medical Center in April 2000.

Lublin was among the first in the United States to study Interferon β-1b and its ability to treat the relapsing-remitting form of multiple sclerosis; in 1993, IFN β-1b was approved by the U.S. Food and Drug Administration for that very purpose.

He is the author of nineteen chapters, 136 publications and one text, and is a member of dozens of medical societies including: the National Multiple Sclerosis Society; the MSSM General Clinical Research Center Advisory Committee; and the executive committee of the International Medical & Scientific Board of the Multiple Sclerosis International Federation.
