= Bianca Marin =

Romanian handball player (born 1999)

Bianca Sorina Marin
Personal information
- Nationality: Romanian
- Born: 21 March 1999 (age 27) Ploiești, Romania
- Height: 1.67 m (5 ft 6 in)

Sport
- Sport: Handball
- Position: Left wing
- Current club: CSM București
- Number: 19

Youth career
- Years: Team
- 2016–2017: CSM Ploiești
- 2017–2018: CSM București

Senior clubs
- Years: Team
- 2018–: CSM București

Bianca Sorina Marin (born 21 March 1999) is a Romanian handball player who plays for CSM București.

== Achievements ==
- Cupa României
  - Winner: 2019
- Supercupa României:
  - Finalist: 2018, 2019
