= Super Moonies =

German band that created songs for Sailor Moon German dub

- Genres: Pop
- Years active: 1998–2000
- Label: Edel AG
- Past members: Bianca Hanif ("Kisu"), Gabriela Gottschalk ("Sailor Moon"), Jascha Anantaponge ("Tuxedo Mask")

Super Moonies was a German pop group created in 1998 to provide the soundtrack for the successful Sailor Moon anime series, particularly the German-dubbed version. Their songs included "Kämpfe Sailor Moon" (Fight Sailor Moon) and "Macht des Mondes" (Power of the Moon), and sold on compilation CDs with unrelated songs by artists such as Jasmin Wagner and Aaron Carter. Original choreography was created by the same choreographer that choreographed Blumchen's Jasmin Live 1998 Tour. That American Choreographer is Kris Mohfanz.

== Singers ==
Super Moonies consisted of the singer Bianca Hanif (known as "Kisu", from the Japanese word for "kiss") and two dancers: Gabriela Gottschalk (now a member of the band Hot Banditoz) as Sailor Moon and Jascha Anantaponge as Tuxedo Mask.

Both Bianca and Gabby (Gabriela) appeared in the 2000 Blümchen (Jasmin Wagner) music video "Ist deine Liebe echt?" (in both versions of the music video: The Original Disco Version & The Kurzer Mix ) as dancers with Blümchen and as her friends.

Super Moonies also appear in Blümchen's VHS biography video "Blümchen '95-'98" during backstage clips of Blümchen on tour, inter cut with her back-up dancers (The B-Boys), and her stage crew.

== Discography ==
The songs by Super Moonies were produced by Avenue Music in Munich, and appeared on CDs by EDEL Records. These include:

- August 3, 1998: CD Sailor Moons Welt (Sailor Moon's World) (This peaked at #5 on the Media Control Charts in Germany))
- September 21, 1998: Single-Auskopplung Kämpfe Sailor Moon (Fight, Sailor Moon) Peaked at #58 on the Media Control Charts)
- January 4, 1999: CD Sailor Moons Wintertraum (Sailor Moon's Winter Dream) (Peaked at #23 on the Media Control Charts)
- July 19, 1999: CD Die Macht des Mondes (The Power of the Moon) (Peaked at #31 on the Media Control Charts)
- January 24, 2000: CD Silver Millennium – Best of Super Moonies
