= Bianca Muratagic =

Swedish singer

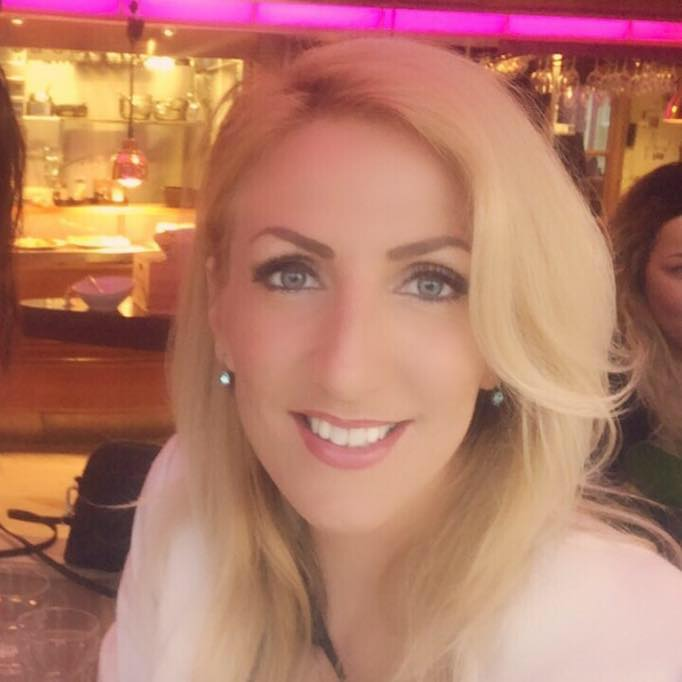
- Born: Bianca Muratagic; 30 September 1977 (age 48); Sarajevo, SR Bosnia and Herzegovina, SFR Yugoslavia
- Occupations: Singer; hostess; singing teacher; entrepreneur; booking agent; columnist
- Musical career
- Genres: Opera
- Instrument: Vocals

Bianca Muratagic (born 30 September 1977) is a Swedish singer, hostess, singing teacher, entrepreneur, booking agent and columnist.

She has worked for 10 years within operas, operettas, musical shows, jazz, blues, soul, rock and sevdah concerts on theaters, opera houses in Sweden and abroad. She has performed on several TV channels and radio stations and she has worked as a voice coach on one of Sweden's most popular singing contests. In March 2017, Nyheter 24 published an article by Muratagic where she stated that "in Sweden the polarisation, hatred and frustration is increasing" because of Swedish mainstream media bias. In October 2018, after the 2018 Swedish general election, she tweeted about the election being rigged due to suspicion of family voting. During a protest at Mynttorget on 16 December 2018, Bianca Muratagic held a speech, alongside Izabella Nilsson Jarvandi and Katerina Janouch. Muratagic is a hostess and moderator of the talkshow Biancas Sverige.

== Early life ==
Bianca Muratagic was born on 30 September 1977 in Sarajevo in the Socialist Republic of Bosnia and Herzegovina. She came to Sweden in 1991 at the age of 14 as a war refugee of the Yugoslav Wars.

== Career ==
Muratagic graduated in opera soloist singing and singing pedagogy in 2004 at Giuseppe Verdi Conservatory in the Academy of Music in Milan. She has also played the titular role of Giacomo Puccini's Tosca at Skånska Operan in Malmö. She has been titled a "singing bird" by Uppsalatidningen. On 11 July 2013, Muratagic performed the song "Sto te nema" at Paul Wallenberg in Stockholm to honour the victims of the Srebrenica massacre. Expo published an article about the event. Muratagic has performed operas, concerts and events on music and theater houses, castles and churches in Sweden, the Czech Republic, Italy and Switzerland. She is also a Sevdalinka in Scandinavia Concerts and other musicals with pop, soul, jazz and blues. As of today, Muratagic runs the song academy "Sångakademi Bianca" in Uppsala where she works as a singing coach, voice coach, art leader, ensemble leader, concert arranger, music producer and songwriter.

== Personal life ==
=== Politics ===
Bianca Muratagic is an active columnist, debater and critic of Swedish mainstream media and the Swedish politics and has published numerous articles on ProjektSanning and KaterinaMagasin. In December 2018 Muratagic published an article demanding that a state of emergency be announced due to the massive increase of rape and violence in Sweden. In April 2018 Dagens Nyheter published an article by Jonas Bengtsson who wrote that Bianca Muratagic had been banned from Facebook after having criticized Annie Lööf, the party leader of the Centre Party of Sweden. In a quote Muratagic says "This is just a way of censoring me." In an article by Nya Tider, Muratagic writes of the "left politics anti-democratic hypocrisy and their supposed solidarity". In November 2017 Bianca Muratagic met up with Eddie Mohamed Omar, known as the "anti-khalif" for a radio interview to discuss "Sweden's dangerous future". In 2017, she initiated a petition to boy-cot the theater show "jihadisten" (jihadist), a Swedish state funded project with the goal of "showing the humanist aspect of the Islamist jihadist". White TV published an article of Bianca Muratagic and Katerina Janouch both being interviewed about the increasing crimes in Sweden and cited several links to petitions encouraging the Swedish public to sign them. Bianca wrote a letter or manual to United States president Donald Trump: "This is how the rotten Swedish legal system works" which was highlighted by alternative media and translated into several different languages in Europe.

== Operas and concerts ==
- Anna Bolena by G.Donizetti in the role of Anna Bolena
- Norma (V. Bellini) in the role of Norma Alcina (G.F.Händel) in the role of Alcina
- Gianni Schicchi (G. Puccini) in the role of Lauretta
- La Wally (A. Catalani) in the role of La Wally
- L'incornazione di Poppea
- (C. Monteverdi) in rollen of Ottavia-Figaros Wedding (W.A. Mozart) in the role of Rosina
- The Count of Maritza (Emmerich Kálmán) in the role of Count Maritza
- Madame Butterfly (G. Puccini) in the role of Madame Butterfly
- Carmen (G. Bizet) in the role of Carmen
