= Åse Frogner =

Norwegian textile artist (1934–2025)

- Born: 10 February 1934; Larvik, Norway
- Died: 18 May 2025 (aged 91)
- Education: Norwegian National Academy of Craft and Art Industry
- Occupation: Textile artist
- Spouse: Dag Frogner

Åse Frogner (10 February 1934 – 18 May 2025) was a Norwegian textile artist and educator.

== Personal life ==
Frogner was born in Larvik on 10 February 1934, a daughter of Antonette Andersen and Ludvig Næss. In 1957 she married painter and scenographer Dag Frogner.

== Career ==
She studied at the Norwegian National Academy of Craft and Art Industry (Statens håndverks- og industriskole) under Kjellaug Hølaas from 1953 to 1957. She was assigned to Sigrun Berg's weavery from 1957 to 1958. From 1958 she lectured at the National Academy of Craft and Art Industry, in coloring and material application.

She was engaged as designer for several Norwegian textile factories, including Halden Bomuldsspinderi & Væveri, De Forenede Ullvarefabrikker, Fredfoss, and Carl Wolf. Her works are represented at the National Museum of Norway, the Norwegian Museum of Decorative Arts and Design, and public buildings.

She wrote a book titled Farge & Fiber, published in 1995.

Frogner died on 18 May 2025, at the age of 91.
