= Branka =

- Gender: female
- Language: Serbo-Croatian, Slovene, Portuguese

Origin
- Origin: Latin
- Meaning: "defender" (Slavic), "white" (Portuguese)
- Region of origin: former Yugoslavia, Portugal, Brazil (spelled with 'C' instead of 'K')

Other names
- Alternative spelling: Bronka
- Variant form: Branko (m)
- Nickname: Brankica (diminutive of Branka)
- Related names: Branca, Blanca

Branka (Serbian Cyrillic: Бранка) is a Serbo-Croatian female given name derived from the Slavic root bran – the same as in Branislav and Branimir – with the meaning "to defend or protect". It can also be a version of the Portuguese name Branca meaning "white" (Casablanca was originally called Casabranca). The name Branka became popular in the territory of former Yugoslavia some hundred years ago.

The name Branka may refer to:

== People ==
- Branka Katić (born 1970), Serbian actress
- Branka Nevistić (born 1968), Serbian television presenter and journalist
- Branka Prpa (born 1953), historian, author, and director of Belgrade's Historical Archives
- Branka Raunig (1935–2008), Bosnian archaeologist, prehistorian, and museum curator

== In fiction ==
- Branka, a character from the video game Dragon Age: Origins
- Moe the bartender from the animated TV sitcom The Simpsons had a Macedonian grandmother he called "Baba Branka."

== Groups ==
- Branka, a splinter group of the Basque armed separatist group Euskadi Ta Askatasuna (ETA) led by Txillardegi from the 1960s to the 1970s

== Places ==
- Branka u Opavy, a municipality and village in the Czech Republic
- Branka, a village and administrative part of Halže in the Czech Republic

== See also ==
- Branko, the masculine equivalent
- Branca, a feminine given name
