= Bianca Maria Meda =

Italian composer

Bianca Maria Meda (c. 1661 – c. 1732) was an Italian nun and Baroque composer.

== Life ==
Little is known about Bianca Maria Meda's life, but she was a Benedictine nun at the convent of San Martino del Leano in Pavia. Although her profession is unknown, she first appears in convent records between August 1677 and February 1678, likely at the age of 16. Meda's death is also undocumented, however, due to the omission of her name in a convent record dated September 1733, it can be assumed that she died before that date around the age of 70. Based on this knowledge, Meda was about 30 years old when her motet collection was published.

Meda was among the final nun composers in 17th-century Italy to publish their music, only being followed by Isabella Leonarda. Given the rarity of female composers being published at the time, Meda's work is a valuable contribution to early modern Italian convent music through its artistic and expressive qualities.

== Music and influence ==
Bianca Maria Meda published only one work, a collection of motets, Mottetti a 1, 2, 3, e 4 voci, con violini in Bologna in 1691.

Meda's motet collection includes 12 pieces. There are two for solo voice, two duets, four trios, and four quartets. Meda's music is presented in six partbooks: Canto, alto, Tenore, Basso, and two books labeled 'Violone' and 'Organo." While Meda's motets are sacred, they are not liturgical. The text reflects a strong influence from the Italian language and is written in the feminine first person. There is a personal relationship between the speaker and Christ, suggesting the voice is of a cloistered nun. While focusing on themes such as spiritual love and worldly desires, some texts show detailed examples of imitatio Christi or the wish to share in Christ's suffering to reach salvation. It is possible the author of the texts was a nun from 'il Leano' or Meda herself.

=== Skills ===
The motets composed by Meda are highly complex, showing the advanced skills of both the singers and instrumentalists in Meda's convent. Pieces such as In tribunale horendo feature a wide vocal range and quick, intricate musical passages. Her works use vivid imagery and frequent word painting to create both intensity and passion.

==== Structure ====
Meda's motets follow a consistent form. Each motet is divided into sections with varying rhythmic and harmonic elements. Full-ensemble sections alternate with solo arias written in a da capo form. Typically, the last section is an energetic alleluia in tutti. Although these pieces were written for a convent, they include tenor and bass parts to meet market demands. The nuns would often transpose these lower parts up or use instrumentation to successfully perform these vocal lines. In order to avoid the difficulties caused by a tenor line in a female ensemble, Meda never paired the bass and tenor together. Along with this, Meda only utilized a tenor vocal line in her quartets while avoiding it all together in the duets and trios.

== Works ==
=== Mottetti a 1, 2, 3, e 4 voci, con violini, e senza (1691) ===
1. Cari musici (soprano, 2 violins, continuo)
2. Volo vivere (bass, 2 violins, continuo)
3. O quante contra me (soprano, bass, continuo)
4. In tribunale horendo (soprano, bass, continuo)
5. Spirate vos Zeffiri (soprano, alto, bass, continuo)
6. Nò non tentate (soprano, alto, bass, continuo)
7. Anime belle (soprano, alto, bass, continuo)
8. Jesu mi clementissime (2 sopranos, bass, continuo)
9. Ardete (soprano, alto, tenor, bass, continuo)
10. In foco ardentissimo (soprano, alto, tenor, bass, continuo)
11. Vibrate (soprano, alto, tenor, bass, continuo)
12. O lacrimæ amaræ (soprano, alto, tenor, bass, continuo)

== Discography ==
- Cappella Artemisia (2018), Lacrime Amare: Bianca Maria Meda Motets (95736), Brilliant Classics, 1 CD.
