= Bianca Frogner =

American health economist

- Born: 1979 (age 46–47); San Carlos, California, USA

Academic background
- Education: BS, Molecular and Cell Biology, 2001, University of California, Berkeley; PhD, health economics, 2008, Johns Hopkins Bloomberg School of Public Health
- Thesis: Long-run modeling of health care expenditure growth in industrialized countries (2008)

Bianca Kiyoe Frogner (born 1979) is an American health economist. As an associate professor at the University of Washington (UW), she is the Director of the UW's Center for Health Workforce Studies and deputy director of the Primary Care Innovation Lab. Prior to joining UW, she was an assistant professor at the Milken Institute School of Public Health at the George Washington University.

== Early life and education ==
Frogner was born in 1979 and raised in San Carlos, California. She attended the University of California, Berkeley for her Bachelor of Science degree in Molecular and Cell Biology before enrolling at Johns Hopkins Bloomberg School of Public Health for her PhD in health economics. As a doctoral student, Frogner worked alongside Gerard Anderson to publish an annual series in journal Health Affairs using data from the Organization for Economic Co-operation and Development. She also served as a consultant on health services delivery issues for the World Bank, the Kaiser Family Foundation, the Bill and Melinda Gates Foundation, and the South Africa National Education Health and Allied Workers Union.

== Career ==
Upon completing her post-doctoral fellowship at the University of Illinois at Chicago School of Public Health, Frogner joined the Health Services Management and Leadership Department faculty at the Milken Institute School of Public Health as an assistant professor. In this role, she trained Health Administrators in the areas of quantitative data and quantitative methods. She stayed there until December 2014 when she accepted an associate professor position in the University of Washington's (UW) Department of Family Medicine and Directorship of the UW's Center for Health Workforce Studies. The following year, Frogner was appointed to the Institute of Medicine Consensus Study Committee on Educating Health Professionals to Address the Social Determinants of Health.

During the 2017–2018 academic year, Frogner published a study in the journal Health Services Research which found that physical therapy was a much more effective pain killer than opioids for lower back pain. As the lead author of the study, she received the 2019 John M. Eisenberg Article-of-the-Year in Health Services Research. Frogner became an active voice in the health community during the COVID-19 pandemic and collaborated with directors from various health workforce research centers to publish Ensuring and Sustaining a Pandemic Workforce through The New England Journal of Medicine. The paper voiced concerns regarding the lack of state regulations and governance surrounding health care professionals and the impact it has on the overall health of patients.
