= Bianca Weinstock-Guttman =

American neurologist

Academic background
- Education: MD, 1983, University of Bucharest

Bianca Weinstock-Guttman is an American neurologist. She is a SUNY Distinguished Professor at the University at Buffalo.

== Early life and education ==
Weinstock-Guttman completed her medical degree at the University of Bucharest in 1983 and her internship at Meir Hospital and Tel Aviv University.

== Career ==
Upon completing her formal education, Weinstock-Guttman accepted a faculty position at University of Buffalo in 1998. In 2006, she helped establish the Pediatric MS Center of Buffalo with a grant from the National Multiple Sclerosis Society. In this role, she received the 2013 UB Exceptional Scholars Sustained Achievement Award.

In 2017, Weinstock-Guttman was named the principal investigator to lead clinical trials exploring potential therapeutic applications of cannabinoids in progressive multiple sclerosis. The following year, she received the National Multiple Sclerosis Society's Impact Award for her research, patient care and advocacy skills. During the COVID-19 pandemic, Weinstock-Guttman co-authored Asymptomatic infection after BNT162b2 mRNA COVID-19 vaccination in multiple sclerosis patient with Dejan Jakimovski. She was also the recipient of the 2020 Stockton Kimball Award for outstanding scientific achievement and service. The following year, she was promoted to the rank of SUNY Distinguished Professor, the highest rank in the SUNY system.
