= Bianca Bloch =

German author (1848–1901)

- Born: 19 January 1848; Lauban, Silesia, Kingdom of Prussia
- Died: May 1901 (aged 53); Görlitz, Saxony, Kingdom of Prussia
- Writing career
- Pen name: B. Waldow
- Language: German

Bianca Bloch (19 January 1848 – early May 1901), also known by the pen name B. Waldow, was a German author.

== Biography ==
Bloch was born in 1848 in Lauban, Silesia. Her father was attendant at a local court, who could only afford to send his children to primary school. She subsequently made up for the deficiency by extensive reading. In this, as in her literary work, she was encouraged by Bernhard Stavenow of Görlitz, who recognized her talent and encouraged it.

In collaboration with C. von Breckheyde (Aline Neumann) she wrote two plays, Ein Heisser Tag—a farce, 1881; and Vor dem Fest—a comedy, 1889. Her other works are: Blauaugen—a farce, 1891; In Ernster Zeit—a drama; Lieutenant und Assessor, oder Maiwein—a comedy; and Strohwitwer—a farce, 1892. Bloch also published poetry and fiction in various magazines.

== Selected publications ==
- Lieutenant und Assessor, oder Maiwein (in German). Berlin: Kühling. 1880. Comedy
- Vor dem Fest (in German). Bern: Suter & Lierow. 1889. With C. von Breckheyde, Schwank in 1 act
- In ernster Zeit (in German). Lauban: Wilhelm Ludwig. 1890. Festival play in 3 acts
- Blauaugen (in German). Braunschweig: Patriotischer Verlag Schlegel. 1891. Schwank in 1 act
- Ein heisser Tag (in German). Landsberg an der Warthe: Volger & Klein. 1891. With C. von Breckheyde, Schwank
- Strohwitwer, oder an Kaisers Geburtstag (in German). Braunschweig: Patriotischer Verlag Schlegel. 1892. Schwank in 1 act
