= Bianca (singer) =

German singer and composer

Herlinde Grobe (born October 5, 1948, in Hausen bei Offenbach), known by her stage name Bianca, is a German singer and composer of folk hits. She is particularly known for her songs with religious content. As a singer she performs under the name "Bianca"; as a composer under her real name "Herlinde Grobe". She writes the lyrics for her songs under the pseudonym "Sandra Mareike".

== Biography ==
Bianca already played the accordion as a child and sang in a children's choir. She underwent classical dance training and eventually became a finetäschnerin. At the age of fifteen, she tried her hand at singing pop songs. Between 1964 and 1968, she released 7 singles under the stage name Berti Glockner. Thomas Fritsch and Bianca released the song Ihr waren doch auch nicht anders as Berti und Thommy in 1966. In the 1970s, she sang in Christian musicals (including the role of Lydia in Siegfried Fietz's Paulus oratorio in 1973). Also in 1973, she recorded the signature tune Radio Luxembourg wishes "Good Morning" for Radio Luxembourg's Happy Alarm Clock. She also sang the chorus with Frank Farian in his hit Rocky (also in Spring über deinen Schatten, Tommy and An mir soll es nicht liegen). In 1977, Farian produced the single Der Junge, den ich nie vergessen kann for Herlinde.

In 1986, she began her career as a singer and composer. She composed two titles (Lieder der Berge and Zaubersee) for the Grand Prix der Volksmusik, which she initially sang herself. In the competition, the titles were then sung by Heino and Uschi Bauer. Heino's song reached 12th place, Uschi Bauer was eliminated early. At the Grand Prix der Volksmusik 1989 she was again represented with two titles composed by her. Hörst du die Glocken von Stella Maria, sung by Edith Prock, reached 4th place, and Die Rosen der Madonna, which she sang herself, reached 5th place. At the Grand Prix der Volksmusik 1990, she tried with the song Lieber Gott, lass uns erhalten and did not make it past the preliminary round. In the same year, she reached 3rd place with Ich träume in der Heide at the Lieder so schön wie der Norden competition in 1990. In 1992 she was at the Grand Prix der Volksmusik 1992 with Schäfers Traum and reached 10th place, and at the Grand Prix der Volksmusik 1995 she did not make it past the preliminary decision. At the Grand Prix der Volksmusik 1996, she took 4th place with Und in Val Campano ist Frühling. She is a frequent guest at folk television and radio events.

She is divorced and has two daughters.

== Awards ==
- 1992: Edelweiss
