= Blanca (given name) =

Blanca is a feminine Spanish given name. Notable people with the name include:

- Blanca of Navarre (disambiguation), the name of various members of the aristocracy
- Princess Blanca of Bourbon (1868–1949), Archduchess and Princess of Austria and Princess of Hungary, Bohemia, and Tuscany by marriage
- Blanca de la Cerda y Lara (c. 1317 – 1347), Spanish noblewoman
- Blanca Delia Pérez, Spanish politician of the Canary Islands
- Blanca Alcalá, Mexican politician
- Blanca Canales (1906–1996), Puerto Rican nationalist leader
- Blanca Castellón (born 1958), Nicaraguan poet
- Blanca Catalán de Ocón (1860-1904), Spanish botanist
- Blanca Eekhout (born 1968), Venezuelan politician
- Blanca Errázuriz (1894–1940), Chilean woman acquitted of the murder of her husband
- Blanca de Gassó y Ortiz (1846–1877), Spanish writer and poet
- Blanca Heredia, Miss Venezuela 1956
- Blanca Lewin (born 1974), Chilean actress
- Blanca Osuna (born 1950), Argentine politician
- Blanca Ovelar (born 1957), Paraguayan politician and former Minister of Education
- Blanca Estela Pavón (1926–1949), Mexican film actress
- Blanca Paloma (born 1989), Spanish singer, set designer and costume designer
- Blanca Portillo (born 1963), Spanish actress
- Blanca Quiñónez (born 2006), Ecuadorian basketball player
- Blanca del Rey (born 1946), Spanish flamenco dancer and choreographer
- Blanca Rodriguez (1926–2020), First Lady of Venezuela (1974–1979, 1989–1993)
- Blanca Rosa Vilchez, Hispanic journalist
- Blanca Suárez, a Spanish actress
- Blanca Callahan, Puerto Rican-born American singer; former member of Christian Pop duo Group 1 Crew

== See also ==
- Blanka (given name), a feminine given name
- Bianca, a feminine given name
- Bianka, a feminine given name
- Branca, a feminine given name
- Branka, a feminine given name
