= Unity: The Latin Tribute to Michael Jackson =

Compilation album by Various artists
- Released: 2015
- Genre: Salsa; tropical
- Length: 58:32 (CD); 73:01 (DVD)
- Label: Universal
- Producer: Tony Succar

Singles from Unity
- 1. "I Want You Back" Released: September, 2012; 2. "Sera que no me amas" Released: October, 2012

Unity: The Latin Tribute to Michael Jackson, also known as Unity, is a collaborative musical project formed to create a Michael Jackson tribute album inspired by Latin music styles. The leader of the project is Peruvian-American musician Tony Succar, and vocals are provided by a number of leading artists in Latin music genres, especially salsa. Succar's aim with the project was to celebrate Jackson's music and legacy by combining it with a Latin-orchestrated sound. The stated goal is "to honor the legacy of Michael Jackson, the King of Pop. By remaining true to his artistic essence, excellence, and music we seek to unify all human beings." Upon its release, the album debuted at number one on the Billboard Tropical Albums chart.

== History ==
When Michael Jackson died on June 25, 2009, Succar was in the final year of a graduate programme at Florida International University. In October of that year Succar was planning a Halloween concert when the client asked him to close the performance with Jackson's song Thriller. At the time Succar had a predominantly salsa band, so he decided to create and perform a salsa arrangement of Thriller. The song was well received by the audience and Succar decided to produce an album of Jackson covers as a tribute. He did not have the funds to begin production, so decided to use Kickstarter to raise the necessary financing. This paid for the initial stages of production and Succar funded ongoing costs by working locally with his band. Succar also faced challenges in obtaining licenses to use Jackson's music; the license for Thriller alone took three years to be granted.

Succar initially worked with fellow FIU students to produce new versions of Jackson's songs in a Latin style. The music was rewritten to include tropical rhythms from the Caribbean. Other influences were jazz, world music and American pop. Succar wanted high-profile singers to provide the vocals for the album. Kevin Ceballo was the first artist to sign up, followed by Tito Nieves. Nieves was initially reluctant due to other commitments, but a backing vocalist who was involved in the project contacted him directly; after listening to a demo of a track from the album Nieves agreed to take part. He recorded two tracks for the album, and his involvement helped Succar bring several other prominent vocalists on board; these include salsa singers La India, Michael Stuart, Jon Secada, Jean Rodríguez, Obie Bermúdez and Jennifer Peña. Secada had previously recorded with Jackson on the 2001 charity single What More Can I Give.

In total around 90 musicians have contributed to the album. Recording has taken place in several major US cities, as well as in Puerto Rico and Peru.

== Performances ==
In late 2012 Succar and the Unity Project performed as the showcase act at a TEDx event at Florida International University. Featured performers included Judith Hill, Sheila E. and Jean Rodríguez. Hill had previously sung with Jackson during rehearsals for the cancelled This Is It concerts. The Miami nightclub Ball & Chain hosted the group in June 2015. A special performance was captured on video at the headquarters of SiriusXM satellite radio in December 2015, and a full show was delivered in Aruba at the Caribbean Sea Jazz Festival in September 2016. The group performed at the October 2018 Miami Salsa Conference.

== Album track listing ==
An album containing 12 tracks produced by Unity was released in April 2015.

All tracks feature Tony Succar.

1. "I Want You Back" (Tito Nieves) – 4:43
2. "Billie Jean" (Jean Rodríguez) – 5:03
3. "Man in the Mirror" (Kevin Ceballo) – 5:09
4. "Sera Que No Me Amas" (Michael Stuart) – 4:43
5. "Earth Song" (La India) – 6:26
6. "Human Nature" (Jon Secada) – 4:13
7. "Todo Mi Amor Eres Tú" (Jennifer Peña and Obie Bermúdez) – 4:25
8. "Black or White" (Kevin Ceballo) – 4:20
9. "Smooth Criminal" (Jean Rodríguez) – 4:40
10. "They Don't Care About Us" (Kevin Ceballo) – 5:06
11. "Thriller" (Kevin Ceballo) – 4:35
12. "You Are Not Alone" (Tito Nieves and Tito Nieves Jr.) – 5:05

== Singles ==
A single from the album, "I Want You Back", was released in September 2012.

A second single entitled "Sera que no me amas" was released through iTunes on October 17, 2012. This is a remake of the 1978 hit "Blame it on the Boogie" by the Jackson 5.

== Personnel ==
- Michael Jackson – composer
- Steve Porcaro – composer
- John Bettis – composer
- Rod Temperton – composer
- Tony Succar – primary artist, producer, arranger
- Tito Nieves – primary artist
- Jean Rodríguez – primary artist
- Kevin Ceballo – primary artist
- Michael Stuart – primary artist
- LA INDIA – primary artist
- Jon Secada – primary artist
- Obie Bermudez – primary artist
- Jennifer Pena – primary artist
- Tito Nieves Jr. – primary artist
- Carlos Alvarez – mixing
- Bruce Swedien – mixing
- Nick Valentin – mixing
- Mike Fuller – mastering

== Reception ==
Raul Da Gama summarised the album as "Suffice it to say that this is no ordinary Latin Tribute. It is a rocking rhythmic re-invention of the music of Michael Jackson... [a] maddeningly brilliant album. And it’s touching and toe-tapping in equal measure."
