= Tony Succar =

Peruvian percussionist and producer (born 1986)

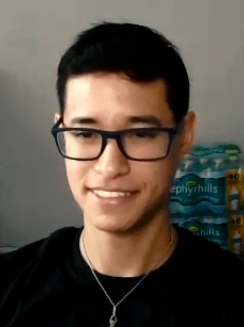
- Succar in 2020
- Born: Antonio Guillermo Succar Tayrako; 18 May 1986 (age 40); Lima, Peru
- Occupations: Musician, composer, arranger, producer
- Parent(s): Mimy Succar; Antonio Succar
- Musical career
- Genres: Salsa; jazz; tropical
- Years active: 1999-present
- Labels: Mixtura; Unity; Universal Latin; Universal Classics
- Website: tonysuccar.com

Antonio Guillermo "Tony" Succar (born 18 May 1986), is a Peruvian naturalized American percussionist, composer, arranger, bandleader, and producer. Succar won two Latin Grammy Awards in 2019 for Best Salsa Album and Producer of the Year. In 2025, he won the Grammy Award for Best Tropical Latin Album along with his mother, the Peruvian singer Mimy Succar.

== Early life ==
Succar was born in Lima, Peru to Antonio F. Succar, a Peruvian pianist, and Miriam Tayrako Sakaguchi, a Peruvian singer of Japanese descent. He has an older sister, Claudia and one younger brother, Brian Kenyi, also an artist and producer. When he was two years old his family emigrated to the United States and settled in Miami, Florida. Among his relatives were a number of musicians who encouraged Succar to develop his own musical interests. The family's musical tradition began with his paternal great-grandparents. Since he was 3 years old Tony started playing the Peruvian cajón. When Succar was 13, he began playing drums with his parents' band when they performed at weddings and other private and corporate functions, mainly in Miami.

== Education ==
Succar attended Miami Sunset Senior High School in Miami-Dade County. At the time his ambition was to be a professional soccer player, and he played in several teams, including his high school team when it won the 2004 state championships. Later he tried to earn a soccer scholarship at Florida International University. Unable to obtain a scholarship, he asked his father for study advice. The advice he got was to apply for FIU's School of Music. Seeking an interview with the school's drum instructor he ended up auditioning for the Latin Jazz ensemble and was quickly accepted. Succar gained a Bachelor of Arts in Jazz Performance in 2008 and went on to study for a master's degree, which he gained in 2010.

== Musical career ==
Succar already had an active musical career while still an undergraduate student. As a college junior, he took over as musical director of the family band, which he rebranded as Mixtura. Mixtura played weekly in various Florida venues but also at Calle Ocho Festival in Miami, Carnaval on the Mile in Coral Gables, Florida, and a salsa cruise with Tito Nieves.

On 21 September 2010, Succar released an album recorded at his graduate recital, a live concert featuring Mixtura at Miami's Wertheim Performing Arts Center. This CD/DVD contains a mix of Latin-influenced arrangements of classic Jazz numbers and original material. It received numerous positive reviews including Audiophile Audition and JazzChicago.

After graduating from FIU, Succar became an artist-in-residence there in 2012, continuing to work with the school's music students on a number of projects. He is the youngest artist ever to hold this appointment at FIU.

Succar has worked with a number of prominent artists in the Latin music genres. These include Tito Nieves, La India, Kevin Ceballo, Michael Stuart, Jon Secada, Jennifer Peña, Jean Rodríguez and Obie Bermúdez, who all collaborated with him on Unity: The Latin Tribute to Michael Jackson.

In 2019, Succar was nominated for a Latin Grammy Award in four separate categories, winning for Best Salsa Album and as Producer of the Year.

In 2023, Succar released Mimy & Tony, an album with his mother, Mimy Succar. The album features José Alberto "El Canario", La India, Haila Mompié, Cali Flow Latino, and Rafael Brito. Tony Succar writes about the album, which was nominated for a Grammy in 2024 for Best Tropical Latin Album:

It combines the wisdom gained through years of experience with a modern and groundbreaking approach. “Mimy & Tony” celebrates beloved classics from Latin American artists while also introducing original hits by Mimy. Both Mimy and Tony shine on this project, not only as a remarkable mother-son duo but also as exceptional artists and creative partners.

== The Unity Project ==
Unity: The Latin Tribute to Michael Jackson is a collaborative project to produce a musical tribute to Michael Jackson. As well as live performances, the project plans to release an album consisting of 14 Jackson songs rewritten to include Latin influences, primarily salsa. and Latin American Ritmos, Succar, who was a long-term fan of Jackson's work, is the founder and producer of the project. Unity was launched in 2015 with a concert at Olympia theater in Miami Sponsored and transmitted by PBS TV, 360 Stations, and also Sponsored by Universal Music Classic. Unity features more than 100 musicians, such Latin superstars as Tito Nieves, Jon Secada, La India, Obie Bermudez, Jennifer Pena, Michael Stuward, Angel Lopez, Sheila E., Judith Hill, Jean Rodríguez, Fernando Vargas, Maribel Diaz, Kevin Ceballo, Presented in PBS TV by Gloria Estefan, mixed by engineer Bruce Swedien. In 2024, through Unity Entertainment, Tony Succar released Mimy & Tony: The Creation of a Dream, a biographical documentary film about Mimy Succar's life and her musical resurgence since her participation in La Voz Perú and her Grammy Award nomination.

== Alma, Corazón, y Salsa ==
In February 2025, Succar and his mother, Mimy Succar, won a Grammy Award for Best Tropical Latin Album. The live album they released was Alma, Corazón, y Salsa (Live at Teatro Nacional). At the same time, Mimy Succar picked up another Grammy for her collaboration with Sheila E. and Gloria Estefan on the song "Bemba Colorá".

== Discography ==
Studio albums

- 2007: El Color del Tambor
- 2015: Unity: The Latin Tribute to Michael Jackson
- 2019: Más de Mí
- 2020: Mestizo
- 2020: Raíces Jazz Orchestra (with Pablo Gil y Raíces Jazz Orchestra)
- 2026: Asuccar

Live albums

- 2010: Live at the Wertheim Performing Arts Center CD/DVD
- 2012: De One (Live Sessions), Vol. 1
- 2016: Unity: The Latin Tribute to Michael Jackson (Live Concert Special)
- 2021: Live in Peru
- 2023: Mimy & Tony (with Mimy Succar)
- 2023: Sirius Live
- 2024: Alma, Corazón y Salsa (Live at Gran Teatro Nacional) (with Mimy Succar)
