= TUMI USA Awards =

Annual awards for Peruvians and Peruvian-Americans

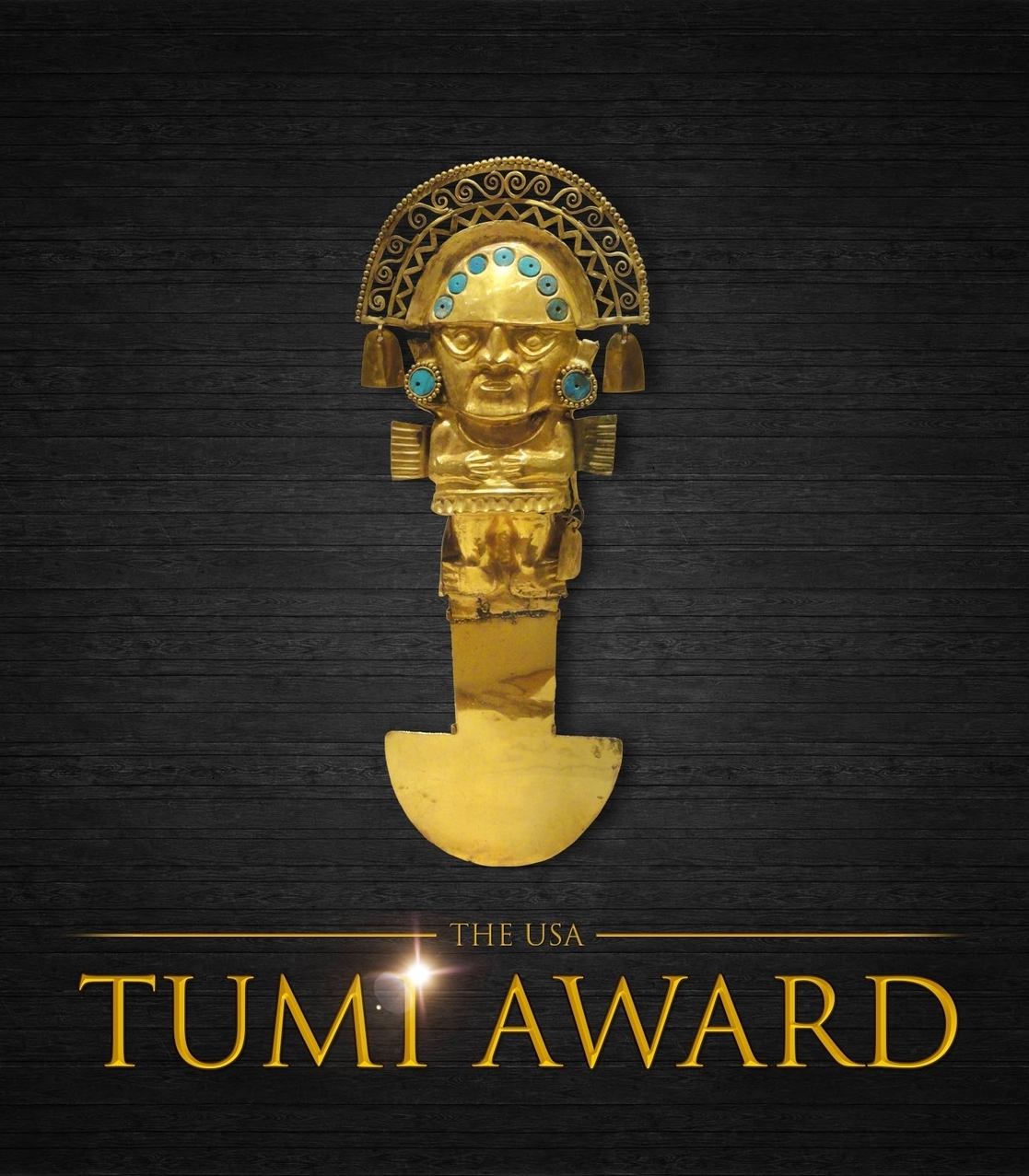
- Awarded for: Excellence in various fields by Peruvians and Peruvian-Americans
- Location: Miami, Florida
- Country: United States
- Presented by: TUMI USA Awards Organization
- First award: 1995
- Website: tumiusa.org

The TUMI USA Awards (also known as Premios Tumi USA) are annual honors presented in the United States to recognize Peruvians and Peruvian-Americans who have excelled in their respective fields. Established in 1995 and based in Miami, Florida, the awards celebrate individuals for their professional success, community service, and contributions to society. They have been referred to as the "Hall of Fame" or even the "Oscar" of the Peruvian community in the U.S., reflecting their prestige within the diaspora. Since their inception, the TUMI USA Awards have honored hundreds of notable personalities from various disciplines, highlighting the talent and achievements of the Peruvian immigrant community.

Each year, a gala awards ceremony is held (often in Miami or other U.S. cities) to bestow the TUMI USA Awards in multiple categories. The award trophy consists of a statuette featuring a Tumi – a ceremonial pre-colonial Peruvian Inca blade symbol – mounted on a clear acrylic block engraved with the winner’s name. This symbol was chosen as it represents Peruvian heritage and excellence. The ceremony and award program were founded by Peruvian community leaders Sergio Massa, Gloria Rosebrough, and Nancy Bradley, who envisioned an event to honor outstanding Peruvian immigrants in the U.S.. Over the years, the organization has grown with the involvement of other figures (including famed ex-footballer Teófilo “Nene” Cubillas as a longtime board member) and has incorporated modern touches such as online voting and virtual events. By its 20th anniversary in 2015, more than 200 individuals had received a TUMI award, and the tradition has continued into the present, including adaptations for events like a virtual ceremony during the COVID-19 pandemic in 2020.

== Award Categories ==
The TUMI USA Awards recognize excellence across a broad range of categories, reflecting the diversity of contributions by Peruvians in America. Award of Excellence (Premio a la Excelencia) is a general distinction given to several individuals each year for outstanding merit in their field. There are typically specific awards for Professional Achievement, Business/Entrepreneurship, Arts and Culture, Gastronomy, Science and Education, and a New Generation Award which honors young emerging figures. For example, in one year the categories included “Profesionales” (professionals), “Empresarios” (businesspeople), “Arte y Cultura” (art and culture), “Nueva Generación” (new generation), as well as special honors like Tribute to the Peruvian Woman and Good Citizen Award for community service.

In addition to these, the TUMI Awards often confer a prestigious Lifetime Achievement Award, reserved for distinguished individuals with a long record of accomplishments. Special awards are occasionally given for unique achievements – for instance, a “Gran Amauta” or other honorary titles for contributions to culture, or surprise awards to notable community heroes. The selection process involves public nominations and voting overseen by the award committee, ensuring community involvement in choosing the honorees. Through these varied categories, the TUMI USA Awards highlight Peruvians excelling in fields ranging from academia and science to gastronomy, arts, sports, journalism, and public service.

== Notable Recipients ==
- Gastón Acurio – Chef/restaurateur.
- Gian Marco Zignago – Singer-songwriter.
- Pedro Pablo Kuczynski – Former President of Peru.
- Jaime Bayly – Journalist/novelist.
- Pedro Suárez-Vértiz – Rock musician.
- Jaime Caudra – Singer.
- Tony Succar – Music producer.
- Mimy Succar – Singer.
- Ana Maria Estrada – Actress.
- Elmer Huerta – Public health specialist.
- Julio Velarde – Economist.
- Juan Chipoco – Chef/restaurateur.
- Jorge Pardo – Singer.
- Julie Freundt – Singer.
- Ines Melchor – Long-distance runner.
- Miguel Valladares – Film producer.
- Teófilo “Nene” Cubillas – Footballer.
- Pedro Pablo Peña – Dancer/choreographer.
- Alicia Cervera – Real estate pioneer.
- Javier Wong – Chef/restaurateur.
- Jorge Koechlin – Race car driver/media entrepreneur.
- Grimanesa Amorós – Light installation artist.
- Auggie Velarde – Music artist.
- Blanca Rosa Vílchez – Journalist.
- Jimmy López – Composer.
- Guillermo Wong – Chef/restaurateur.
- Elaine King – Financial educator.
- Rocío Quispe-Agnoli – Scholar.
- Marino Morikawa – Environmental scientist.
- Claudia Cisneros – Journalist.
- Percy Cespedez – Director.
- Cecilia Alegría Varona – Journalist/author.
