= Infanta Blanca =

Infanta Blanca may refer to:

== Navarre ==
- Blanca of Navarre, Queen of Castile (died 1156)
- Blanche of Navarre, Countess of Champagne (c. 1177–1229)
- Blanche of Navarre, Duchess of Brittany (1226–1283)
- Blanche of Navarre, Queen of France (c.1331–1398), Queen of France
- Blanche I of Navarre (1387–1441), Queen of Navarre
- Blanche II of Navarre (c.1449–1487), also Infanta of Aragon, and titular Queen of Navarre

== Castile ==
- Blanche of Castile (1188–1252), Queen of France
- Blanche of France, Infanta of Castile (1253–1323)

== Spain ==
- Princess Blanca of Bourbon (1868–1949), infanta claimed by the Carlists

== Portugal ==
- Infanta Branca, Lady of Guadalajara (1198–c.1240)
- Blanche of Portugal (1259–1321)

== See also ==
- Blanca (given name)
- Blanche (given name)
- Blanca of Navarre (disambiguation)
