= Anthony Roth Costanzo =

American countertenor (born 1982)

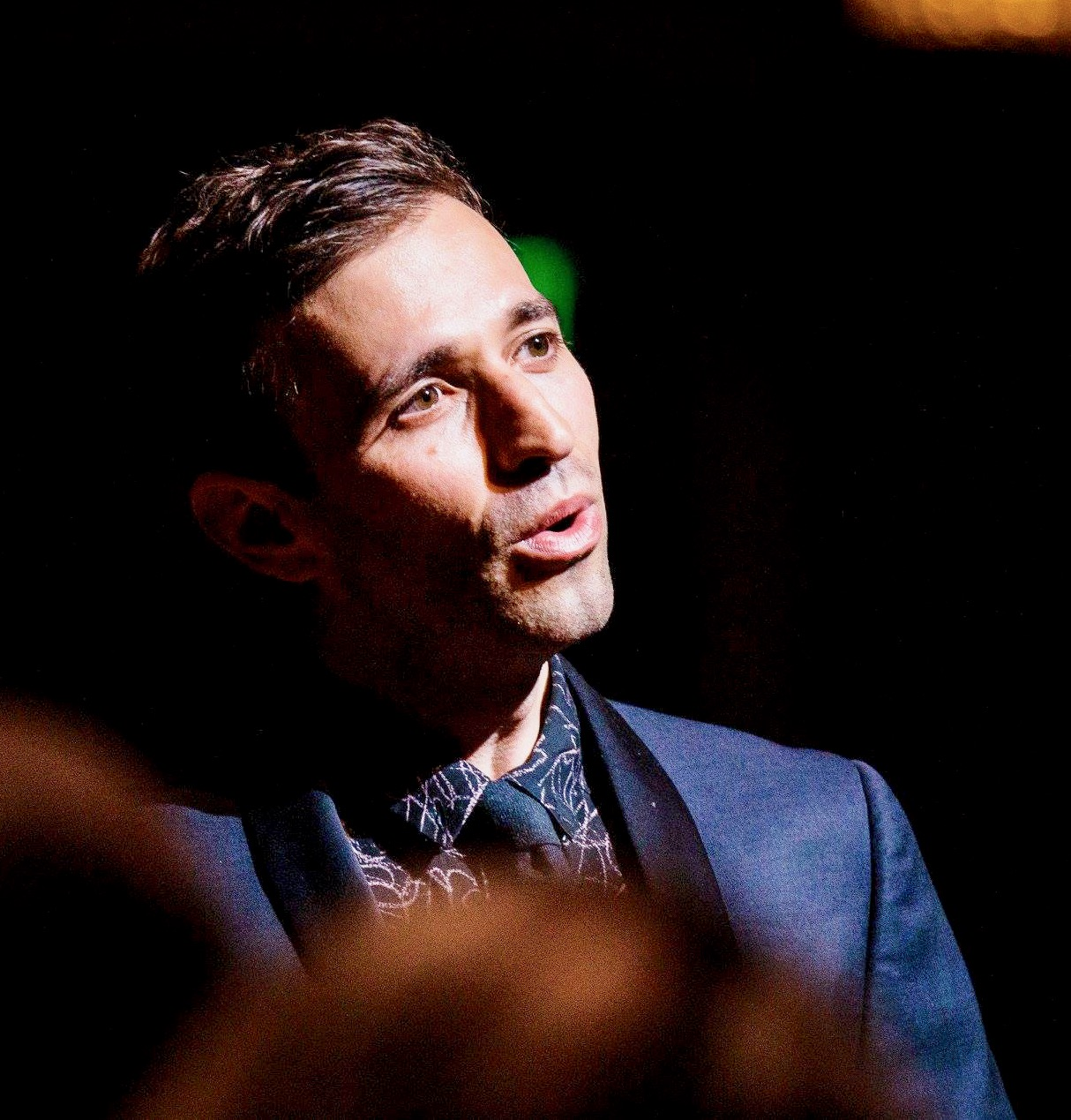
- Anthony Roth Costanzo singing at an event for Cincinnati Opera in June 2018

Background information
- Born: May 8, 1982 (age 44); Durham, North Carolina, U.S.
- Genres: Classical, contemporary classical music
- Occupation: Opera singer (countertenor)
- Years active: 1993–present
- Label: Decca Gold
- Website: anthonyrothcostanzo.com

Anthony Roth Costanzo (born 8 May 1982) is an American countertenor and opera director. He began his career in musical theatre at the age of 11. Costanzo is a graduate of Princeton University and of the Manhattan School of Music. In 2012, he won first place at the Operalia competition. In 2009, he was a Grand Finals winner of the Metropolitan Opera National Council Auditions. He has been an actor in film and a producer and curator. He is the designated general director and president of Opera Philadelphia, where he has instituted a flexible ticket pricing policy.

== Early life ==
Costanzo grew up in Durham, North Carolina. Both of Costanzo's parents were professors of psychology at Duke University. His mother was Hungarian-Jewish, and his father Italian.

Costanzo became active in the arts at a young age. He performed on Broadway and in Broadway national tours including A Christmas Carol, The Sound of Music, and Falsettos. He sang backup for Michael Jackson and the Olsen Twins, as well as a duet with Deborah Gibson. He began his opera career while still a teenager, performing the role of Miles in The Turn of the Screw. Costanzo also performed with Luciano Pavarotti in the Opera Extravaganza production by the Academy of Music in Philadelphia.

== Education ==
Costanzo graduated magna cum laude and Phi Beta Kappa from Princeton University in 2004 with a degree in music. He was awarded the Lewis Sudler prize in the arts. Costanzo frequently returns to Princeton to teach courses and master classes. After Princeton, Costanzo attended the Manhattan School of Music, where he received his Masters of Music and earned the Hugh Ross Award.

== Career ==
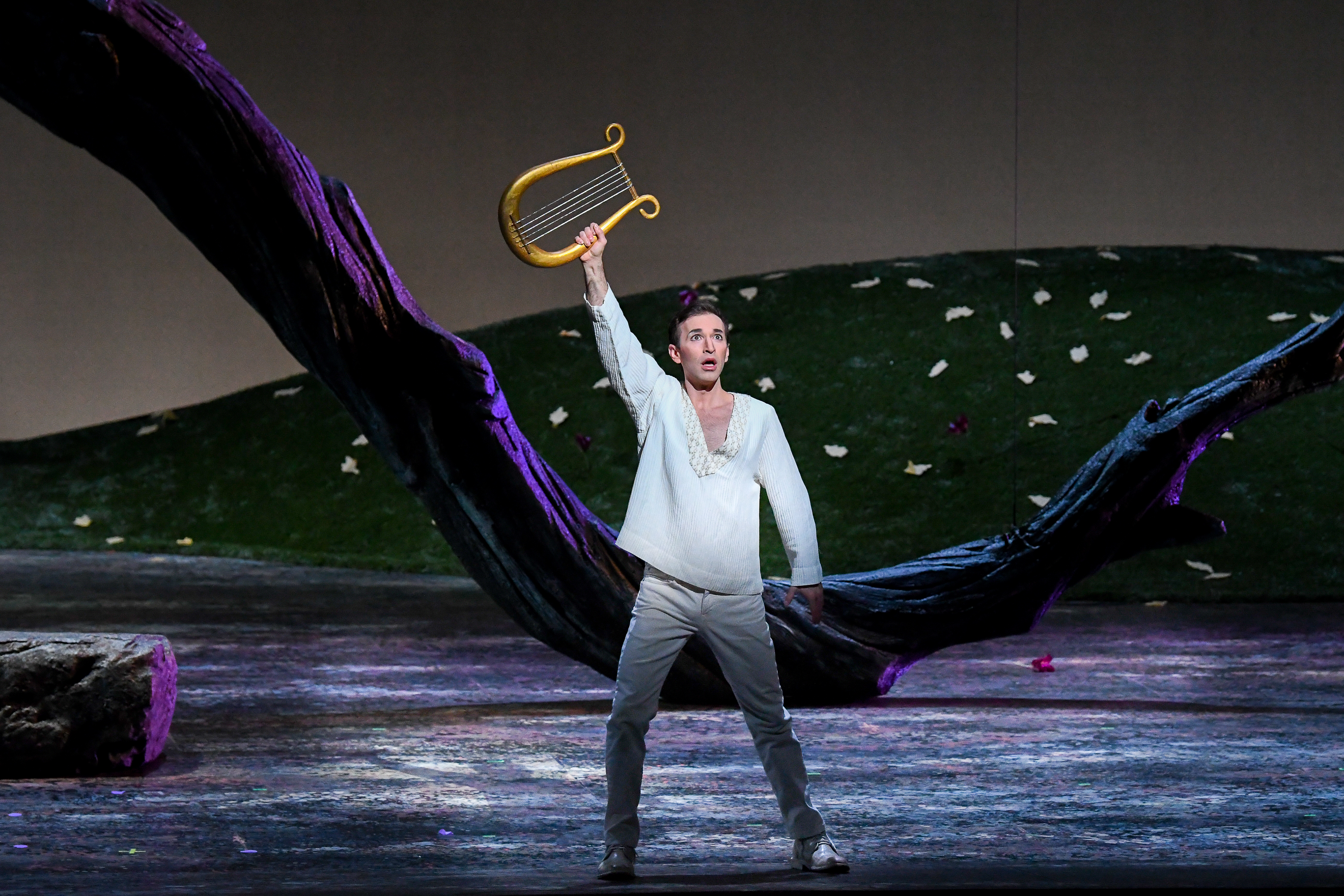
Costanzo as Orfeo in Orfeo ed Euridice with Florida Grand Opera

=== Opera ===
Costanzo has appeared in numerous roles at the Metropolitan Opera. He has appeared as both Ferdinand and Prospero in the world premiere of The Enchanted Island. He also performed as Prince Orlofsky in a production of Die Fledermaus after making his debut as Unulfo in Rodelinda.

Costanzo has appeared in many venues throughout North America. He performed the title role in Philip Glass' Akhnaten at the English National Opera, the Los Angeles Opera, and again at the Metropolitan Opera in November and December 2019. He has also appeared with the San Francisco Opera, Lyric Opera of Chicago, Houston Grand Opera, Dallas Opera, Glimmerglass Festival, Opera Philadelphia, San Diego Opera, Boston Lyric Opera, Michigan Opera Theater, Palm Beach Opera, The North Carolina Opera, Cincinnati Opera, and as a guest with Juilliard Opera.

Internationally, Costanzo made his European debut at the Glyndebourne Festival in Rinaldo and later performed with the Canadian Opera Company. Costanzo appeared at the Teatro Real Madrid in Death in Venice in 2014, the English National Opera in The Indian Queen in 2015 and the Finnish National Opera in Kaija Sariaaho's Only the Sound Remains in 2017.

A champion of new works, Costanzo has created roles in Jimmy López's Bel Canto at the Lyric Opera of Chicago and Jake Heggie's Great Scott at Dallas Opera. He has also premiered works written for him by Matthew Aucoin, Paola Prestini, Gregory Spears, Suzanne Farrin, Bernard Rands, Scott Wheeler, Mohammed Fairouz, Steve Mackey, and Nico Muhly.

In April 2024, Opera Philadelphia announced the appointment of Costanzo as its next general director and president, effective 1 June 2024, with an initial contract of three years. In January 2026, Opera Philadelphia announced the extension of Costanzo's contract as general director and president of the company through 31 May 2029.

=== Concert ===
In 2018 Costanzo made his concert debuts with the London Symphony Orchestra and the Berlin Philharmonic in performances of György Ligeti's Le Grand Macabre, conducted by Simon Rattle and directed by Peter Sellars. He sang in Messiah at Carnegie Hall in 2009. Costanzo appeared in the New York Philharmonic's production of Le Grand Macabre in 2010. Costanzo performed in Handel's Messiah, Bernstein's Chichester Psalms and Orff's Carmina Burana with The Cleveland Orchestra.

Costanzo has also appeared in concert with the International Contemporary Ensemble (ICE) at both the Mostly Mozart Festival and the Metropolitan Museum of Art. Costanzo has also performed with Jordi Savall in Barcelona, Paris, and Versailles, with Ian Bostridge and Julius Drake at the Teatro Real, and the Spoleto Festival USA. He has also appeared with the San Francisco Symphony, the National Symphony Orchestra, Trinity Church Wall Street, and the orchestras of Indianapolis, Detroit, Denver, Birmingham (Alabama), and Seattle.

=== Collaboration ===
In 2018, Costanzo created an art installation with multimedia fashion and art company Visionaire, producer Cath Brittan, artist George Condo, fashion designer Raf Simons (chief creative officer of Calvin Klein), choreographer Justin Peck, dancers David Hallberg and Patricia Delgado, and other artists including James Ivory, Pix Talarico, Maurizio Catellan, Pierpaolo Ferrari, Mark Romanek, Mickalene Thomas, Daniel Askill, AES+F, and Chen Tianzhuo. He recently helped create two unique collaborations with Kabuki and Noh actors in a presentation of The Tale of Genji, with sold-out runs in Tokyo and Kyoto. His has curated and produced two sold-out runs of performances for National Sawdust including Aci, Galatea e Polifemo, and Orphic Moments which traveled to the Salzburger Landestheater, and then Lincoln Center's Rose Theater with MasterVoices. At Princeton, Costanzo also created a pasticcio about castrati in collaboration with choreographer Karole Armitage and filmmaker James Ivory, which was chronicled by the documentarian Gerardo Puglia. The film was selected for the Cannes Film Festival and qualified for an Academy Award, airing on PBS affiliates.

In New York City, he has appeared in venues such as the Park Avenue Armory, Joe's Pub, the Guggenheim Museum, (Le) Poisson Rouge, Subculture, The Box Soho, Morgan Library & Museum, the Metropolitan Museum of Art, the Miller Theatre, the New York Public Library, and Madison Square Garden. In 2020 during the COVID-19 pandemic, Costanzo devised the 'NY Phil Bandwagon' project in collaboration with the New York Philharmonic, for small-scale, socially distanced outdoor concerts.

Costanzo was nominated for an Independent Spirit Award for his role of Francis in the Merchant Ivory film, A Soldier's Daughter Never Cries. He also played Simon in Brice Cauvin's film De Particulier a Particulier and portrayed Allen Ginsberg in the short film Starving Hysterical Naked.

In 2023, he collaborated with the group Princess Goes, made up of Michael C. Hall, Matt Katz-Bohen and Peter Yanowitz, on the track "Saving Grace" for their second album Come of Age.

=== Recordings, publications ===
Costanzo is an exclusive recording artist for Decca Gold. His debut album, ARC, was released in 2018. It features backing from Les Violons du Roy with Jonathan Cohen conducting and consists of operatic works by Philip Glass and Handel. It was nominated for the 2019 Grammy Best Classical Solo Vocal Album.

Costanzo collaborated with cabaret artist Justin Vivian Bond on their show "Only an Octave Apart" which premiered at St. Ann's Warehouse in Brooklyn and went to London in the fall of 2022. They released an album of music by the same name.

He published a book about the history of the countertenor in 2026, Countertenor.

== Personal life ==
Costanzo is gay. He participated in the pride month event hosted by the Metropolitan Opera.

While a guest on Fresh Air in November 2026, Constanzo told interviewer Terry Gross that he considered having a Bar Mitzvah as a young teen, but he and his mother decided that having performed the Bar Mitzvah scenes in Falsettos so many times was sufficient.

== Major performances ==
=== Operas ===
- Metropolitan Opera (Rodelinda, Die Fledermaus, The Enchanted Island, Akhnaten)
- Lyric Opera of Chicago (Bel Canto – world premiere)
- San Francisco Opera (Partenope)
- English National Opera (Akhnaten, The Indian Queen)
- Los Angeles Opera (Akhnaten)
- Glyndebourne Festival Opera (Rinaldo)
- Houston Grand Opera (Giulio Cesare)
- Teatro Real, Madrid (Death in Venice)
- Opera Philadelphia (Written on Skin, Phaedra)
- Canadian Opera Company (Semele)
- White Light Festival – Lincoln Center (Stabat Mater)
- Glimmerglass Festival (Tolomeo, Stabat Mater, Dido and Aeneas, and Giulio Cesare)
- Cincinnati Opera (L'incoronazione di Poppea)
- Dallas Opera (Great Scott – world premiere)
- Spoleto Festival USA (Farnace, Dido and Aeneas)
- Finnish National Opera (Only the Sound Remains)
- Florida Grand Opera (L'Orfeo)
- Boston Lyric Opera (Agrippina)
- San Diego Opera (Great Scott)
- Palm Beach Opera (L'Orfeo)
- Michigan Opera Theatre (Giulio Cesare)
- New York City Opera (Partenope)
- Juilliard Opera (Ariodante)
- Manhattan School of Music (Griffelkin)
- Seattle Opera Young Artists Program (A Midsummer Night's Dream)
- Santa Fe Opera world premiere 2017 (The Lord of Cries by John Corigliano and Mark Adamo)
- Paris Opera (The Exterminating Angel, Satyagraha)

=== Orchestra ===
- New York Philharmonic (Le Grand Macabre)
- Cleveland Orchestra (Messiah)
- National Symphony Orchestra (Messiah)
- London Symphony Orchestra (Le Grand Macabre)
- Berlin Philharmonic (Le Grand Macabre)
- Tours in Spain and France with Jordi Savall and his ensemble

== Awards ==
Award	Competition	Year
Nomination	61st Annual Grammy Awards: Best Classical Solo Vocal Album	2019
First place	Operalia	2012
Richard Tucker Career Grant	The Richard Tucker Foundation Competition	2010
George London Award	The George London Foundation Competition	2010
First place and Audience Choice	The Houston Grand Opera Eleanor McCullom Competition	2010
Grand Finals Winner	Metropolitan Opera National Council Auditions	2009
First place	National Opera Association Vocal Competition/Artist Division	2009
First place	Jensen Foundation Competition	2009
Richard F. Gold Career Grant	Shoshana Foundation	2009
Top award	Sullivan Foundation Auditions	2008
First place	Opera Index Vocal Competition	2008

== Leadership roles ==
- Board of Trustees, Manhattan School of Music
- Advisory Council, Department of Music, Princeton University
- Artistic Advisory Council, National Sawdust
- Artistic Advisory Board, Glimmerglass Festival
- Artistic Advisory Board, Brooklyn Youth Chorus
- Board of Directors, American Opera Project
- Advisory Board, Brooklyn Music School
- Advisor to the Board, Jonah Bokaer Arts Foundation
- Board member, National Black Theatre
