= Jacques Imbrailo =

South African classical baritone (born 1978)

- Born: 1978 (age 47–48)
- Origin: Free State, South Africa
- Education: Potchefstroom University (B.A., BMus)
- Genres: Opera
- Occupation: Musician
- Instrument: Singer
- Awards: BBC Cardiff Singer of the World competition – Audience Prize; 2007

Jacques Imbrailo (born 1978) is a South African classical baritone, who sings in operas and oratorios.

== Biography and career ==
Jacques Imbrailo grew up on a farm in the Free State province of South Africa, and first got into singing on a dare, at age 11, during open auditions after a concert by the Drakensberg Boys' Choir School. He later went to university to study law, but took singing lessons on the side, earning both a BA Law degree and a B Mus degree at Potchefstroom Campus in South Africa, in 2002. He later studied at the Royal College of Music in London. He was also a member of the Jette Parker Young Artists Programme at the Royal Opera House, Covent Garden.

Imbrailo has been recognized in many competitions, and was runner-up at the South African Music Rights Organization International Scholarship competition, winner of Distell National Singing Competition in South Africa, won second prize at the 2005 Richard Tauber singing competition, won the vocal category of the Royal Overseas League Competition, and was finalist in the Kathleen Ferrier Competition. In 2007, Imbrailo received the Audience Prize at the BBC Cardiff Singer of the World competition.

Imbrailo's first major success was his performance as Billy Budd in Britten's opera at Glyndebourne in 2010, and he has since performed on the great opera stages around the world. He has performed Debussy's Pelléas et Mélisande with the Welsh National Opera and at the Aalto Theatre in Essen, Germany, Mozart's Don Giovanni with the Scottish Opera, Così fan tutte with the Houston Grand Opera, Die Zauberflöte with the Welsh National Opera, Le nozze di Figaro with the Royal Opera House, Covent Garden, and Purcell's Dido and Aeneas with Rome Opera. In 2015, he created the role of Joachim Messner at the world premiere of Jimmy López' opera Bel Canto for the Lyric Opera of Chicago.

He has also performed in concert with the Hallé Orchestra and Sir Mark Elder at the BBC Proms, and with the New York Philharmonic under Rafael Frühbeck de Burgos. He has performed solo recitals at Wigmore Hall, the Concertgebouw in Amsterdam, the Verbier Festival, and Royal Albert Hall.

== Discography ==
Jacques Imbrailo has featured on several recordings, including Britten's Billy Budd, where he played the title role, recorded at the Glyndebourne Festival, with the London Philharmonic Orchestra, and conductor Sir Mark Elder, and Elgar's The Apostles, with the Hallé Orchestra, also conducted by Sir Mark Elder. There are also a number of DVDs and Blu-rays featuring his performances, in operas such as Bizet's Carmen, Debussy's Pelléas et Mélisande, and Britten's Billy Budd.
