= Valdemar Villadsen =

Danish operatic tenor

Valdemar Villadsen (born October 17, 1979) is a Danish operatic tenor, known for his performances across Europe's leading opera houses and concert venues.

== Early life and education ==
Villadsen was raised in Copenhagen, Denmark. Initially, he worked as an actor before transitioning to classical singing. He was accepted into the Royal Danish Academy of Music, where he completed his studies in 2012.

== Career ==
Villadsen made his professional debut in 2012 in Yuri Possokhov's Narcissum at the Royal Danish Theatre in Copenhagen. Since then, he has performed at major opera houses such as the Staatsoper Berlin - Unter den Linden, Royal Opera House La Monnaie in Brussels, and the Royal Danish Opera, as well as concert venues including the Royal Albert Hall, Berliner Philharmonie, and Queen Elizabeth Hall.

Villadsen's repertoire includes works from a variety of musical styles, such as bel canto opera, early and Baroque music, Mozart, and contemporary classical music. Villadsen is also recognized as a Bach evangelist, frequently performing Bach's St. Matthew Passion and St. John Passion.

In addition to his singing career, Villadsen works as a stage director, having directed opera productions and theatrical works at venues such as Shakespeare's Globe Theatre.
