= Universal Music Latin Entertainment =

American record label; record company, division of Universal Music Group

- Parent company: Universal Music Group (UMG)
- Founded: 2008; 18 years ago
- Distributors: Self-distributed (in the US); Universal Music Group (Outside the US)
- Genre: Latin music
- Country of origin: United States
- Location: Los Angeles, California
- Official website: universalmusica.com

Universal Music Latin Entertainment (UMLE), also known as Universal Música, is the Latin music division of Universal Music Group (UMG), founded in 2008. Headquartered in Los Angeles, with offices in Miami, it oversees the marketing and distribution of Latin music in the US (including Puerto Rico) and Mexico.

UMLE includes labels such as Universal Music Latino, Fonovisa Records, Universal Music México, Capitol Latin, Machete Music, and Disa Records. The division was formed after UMG acquired Univision Music Group and merged it with its roster of Latin artists and catalog.

== Labels ==
=== Univision Records (2001–2008) ===
Launched mid 2001, Univision Records already had a considerable artist roster: Anasol, Pilar Montenegro, Anaís, Jennifer Peña, Graciela Beltrán, Iman, Los Forasteros, Daniel René, and most recently Mexican Ranchero music icon, Pepe Aguilar.

- In 2003, Jennifer Peña became the only female artist nominated for a Grammy in the "Best Mexican/Mexican-American Album" category.
- The label was dissolved in May 2008 with Univision Music Group being acquired.

=== Fonovisa Records & Disa Records (now FONO) ===
Acquired in 2002 back then by Univision Music Group, Fonovisa is the largest Regional Mexican label in the music industry and since 1984 has launched major Latin stars into international markets and mainstream America.

- Fonovisa's impressive roster of over 120 artists include multi-platinum artists Marco Antonio Solís, Banda El Recodo de Cruz Lizárraga, Conjunto Primavera, Los Temerarios, and Los Tigres del Norte.

Disa Records is the second largest Regional-Mexican label after Fonovisa. It was owned by the Chávez family of Monterrey until June 2001, when Univision acquired 50% of Disa from the Chávez family. In November 2006 Univision acquired the other 50% of the label making it a subsidiary of Univision Music Group.

- Disa represents over 50 artists, many of which are household names in Spanish-language music, including Palomo, Los Angeles Azules, Grupo Bryndis, Liberación, El Poder del Norte, and most recently, renowned Mexican actress and singer, Aracely Arámbula.

On May 14, 2025, Fonovisa and Disa fully merged to make FONO. The merge expanded the label's roster and would partner with more labels and artists since then.

=== Machete Music ===
Machete Music includes the top reggaeton artists from Puerto Rico and Latin artists from all over the world. Artists like Akwid, Wisin & Yandel, Ivy Queen, Daddy Yankee, Don Omar, Molotov, and others.

=== Universal Music Latino ===
Formed in 1997, Universal Music Latino includes top artists from the Latin music genre, including Tono Rosario, music group Belanova, music artists Luis Fonsi, Enrique Iglesias, Juanes, Olga Tañón, David Bisbal. PolyGram Latino merged with Universal Music Latino after Universal Music Group's acquisition of PolyGram. In 2006 UML with Vene Music started Siente Music. Canadian born artist Nelly Furtado and Miami rapper Pitbull have also joined Universal to release a Spanish album.

=== Capitol Latin ===
Following Universal Music Group's acquisition of EMI Music in 2012, Capitol Latin was merged with UMLE. The label includes artists that were signed on at the time of the acquisition.

=== Aftercluv Dance Lab ===
A label which focuses mainly on the electronic music Latin audience. Launched in 2014, musical acts that have signed on to the label include Cher Lloyd, 3Ball MTY, Juan Magan, Atellagali, Marcelo Cic, and Buraka Som Sistema.

=== Defunct labels ===
- RMM Records & Video
- PolyGram Latino
  - Rodven Records

== List of artists on UMLE ==
This is a list of artist currently signed on to Universal Music Latin Entertainment.

- 3Ball MTY
- Aaron Emanuel
- Adrian Monroy
- Alejandro Fernández
- Alejandro Sanz
- Alex Midi
- Alkilados
- Allan Ramirez
- Alvaro Soler
- Alx Veliz
- America Sierra
- Andrea Bocelli
- Ariana Grande
- Anahí
- Anitta (Floresta/Republic/Universal Music Latino)
- AtellaGali
- Animation vs. Minecraft - Kids Songs
- Animation vs. Minecraft & Monster School - Kids Songs
- Banda Carnaval
- Banda El Recodo
- Banda Los Recoditos
- Banda Los Sebastianes
- Banda Rancho Viejo
- Belanova
- Beto Verdejo
- Buraka Som Sistema
- Café Tacuba
- Cali & El Dandee
- Camila Fernández
- Charly Black
- Chino & Nacho
- Christian Pagan
- Chuy Liazaragga
- Chuy & Miguel
- Club Banditz
- Código FN
- Coti
- Cynthia Erivo
- Daddy Yankee
- Danay Suarez
- Danna Paola
- David Bisbal
- David Bustamante
- Diego Moura
- Don Omar
- DRIMS
- Dulce María
- El Bebeto
- El Dasa
- El Dusty
- Elvis Crespo
- Emmanuel
- Enigma Norteño
- Enjambre
- Eros Ramazzotti
- Eyes of Providence
- Gelab
- Grupo Bryndis
- Grupo Canaveral
- Grupo H100
- Grupo Sexto Sentido
- Hijos de Barrón
- Huichol Musical
- Héctor el Father
- Intocable
- Ivete Sangalo
- Ivy Queen
- Javier Rosas
- J Balvin (Universal Latin/Interscope | SONO Music Group)
- Jencarlos Canela
- Jesus Mendoza
- Joaquina
- Joey Montana
- Jorge Valenzuela
- Jon Valentine
- Juanes
- Juan Gabriel
- Juan Luis Guerra
- Juan Magan
- Julian Mercado
- Julión Álvarez
- Karla Luna
- Karlos Rosé
- Karol G
- KIDZ BOP Kids
- La Arrolladora Banda El Limón
- La Bandononona Clave Nueva
- La Estructura
- La Maquinaria Norteña
- La Poderosa Banda San Juan
- Larry Hernández
- La Santa Cecilia
- La Septima Banda
- Lasso
- Laura Denisse
- León Larregui
- Los Angeles Azules
- Los Bañales Juniors
- Los Hijos de Hernandez
- Los Horóscopos de Durango
- Los Primos MX
- Los Rakas
- Los Tigres del Norte
- Los Tres Tristes Tigres
- Los Tucanes de Tijana
- Lucero
- Luciano Pereya
- Luis Fonsi
- Luz Maria
- Mafer Chavana
- Manny Manuel
- Manuel Carrasco
- Marcelo CIC
- Marco Antonio Solís
- Malu Trevejo
- MLKMN
- Molotov
- Mon Laferte
- Monster School - WildBrain - Kids Songs
- Pablo Lopez
- Palomo
- Paty Cantú
- Paula Fernandes
- Pedro Fernández
- Pesado
- Pirulo y la Tribu
- El Poeta Callejero
- Proyecto X
- Remmy Valenzuela
- Roberto Tapia
- Rodrigo Aguilar "El Pantera"
- Saul "El Jaguar" Alarcón
- Selena
- Suzie Del Vecchio
- Tan Biónica
- Tiempo Libre
- Tom & Collins
- Yunel Cruz
- Zoé

== List of former artists on UMLE ==
These are artists who were formerly signed on to either Universal Music Latin Entertainment or Universal Music Latino.

- 24 Horas
- Alessandro Safina
- Alih Jey
- Amaury Gutiérrez
- Ana Isabelle
- ANG
- Babasónicos
- Cheo Feliciano
- Chenoa
- Christian Nodal
- Cristian Castro
- Diego Torres
- Domingo Quiñones
- Enrique Iglesias
- Franco De Vita
- Gloria Trevi
- Grupo Manía
- Gustavo Galindo
- Jandy Feliz
- Jason Flores Contreras
- Il Volo
- J-King & Maximan
- Jenni Rivera
- José Feliciano
- Jon Valentine
- Juan Velez
- Kevin Ceballo
- La Factoría
- Makano
- Manny Manuel
- Michael Stuart
- Myriam Hernández
- Oscar D'León
- Paulina Rubio
- R.K.M. & Ken-Y
- Rosana
- Sandy & Junior
- Sergio Dalma
- Soraya
- Tamara
- Toño Rosario
- Wisin & Yandel
- Yolandita Monge
- Zucchero

== See also ==
- List of Universal Music Group labels
