= Danielle de Niese =

Australian-American lyric soprano (born 1979)

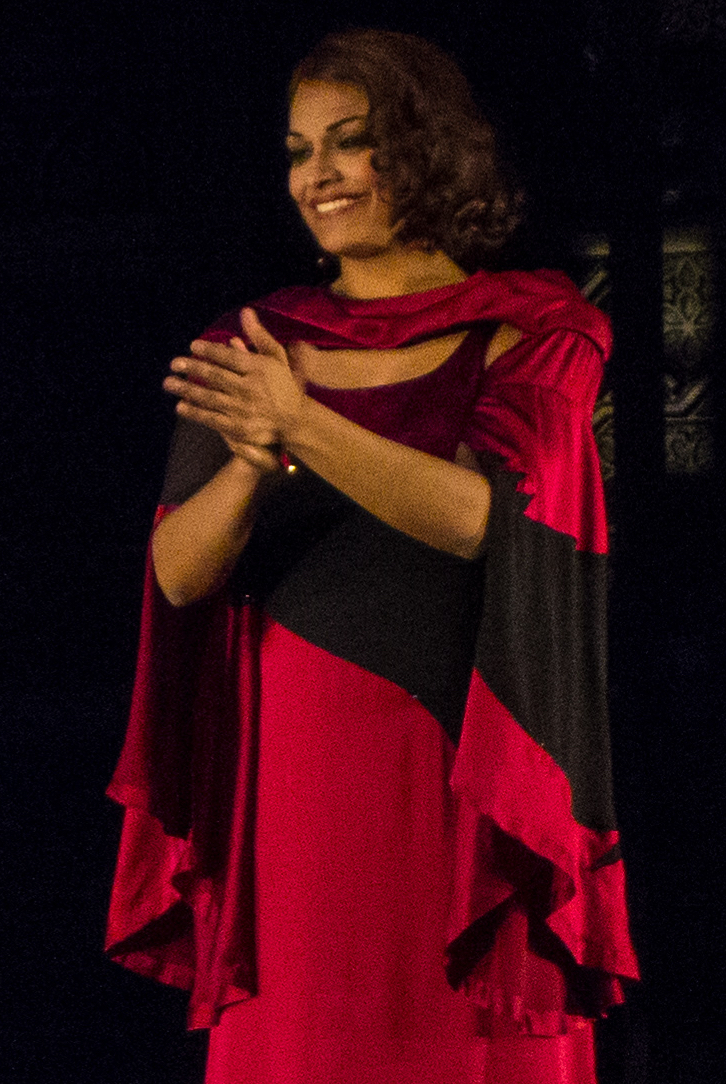
- De Niese at the Metropolitan Opera, 2014
- Born: 11 April 1979 (age 47); Melbourne, Australia
- Occupation: Operatic soprano
- Spouse: Gus Christie (m. 2009)
- Children: 2
- Awards: Emmy Award
- Website: danielledeniese.com

Danielle de Niese (born 11 April 1979) is an Australian-American lyric soprano. After success as a young child in singing competitions in Australia, she moved to the United States, where she developed her operatic career. From 2005, she came to widespread attention with her performances as Cleopatra in Giulio Cesare at Glyndebourne Festival Opera in the United Kingdom.

== Early life ==
De Niese was born in Melbourne, Victoria, Australia. Her parents, Chris and Beverly, had migrated to Australia from Sri Lanka as teenagers. She is a Sri Lankan Burgher with some Dutch and Scottish heritage. In 1988, at the age of nine, she became the youngest winner of the Australian TV talent competition Young Talent Time, singing a Whitney Houston medley. The prize was A$ 5,000, and a Yamaha baby grand piano, which she still owns.

In 1990, her family moved to Los Angeles, where she became a regular guest host of the TV programme L.A. Kids, for which she won an Emmy Award at the age of 16.

== Career ==
De Niese made her professional operatic debut at the age of 15 with the Los Angeles Opera. She became the youngest singer ever to participate in the Young Artists Studio at the Metropolitan Opera, where she debuted in 1998 at the age of 19 as Barbarina in a new production of The Marriage of Figaro directed by Jonathan Miller and conducted by James Levine. She studied voice privately with Ruth Falcon, and at the Mannes College of Music in Manhattan.

Ridley Scott's 2001 film Hannibal features a scene from Dante's La Vita Nuova; in it, de Niese sings as the character Beatrice the song "Vide Cor Meum" by Patrick Cassidy. She was subsequently asked to perform the title role in the Met's production of Maurice Ravel's L'enfant et les sortilèges. Other Met roles include Cleopatra in Giulio Cesare (2007), Euridice in Orfeo ed Euridice (2009), and Susanna in the same production of The Marriage of Figaro in which she sang Barbarina in 1998.

De Niese's career has ranged through Baroque music (Poppea in L'incoronazione di Poppea), via Handel, Mozart and contemporary opera premieres (RAAFF by Robin de Raaff, 2004, Dutch National Opera) at major opera houses around the world, to Broadway (Les Misérables) and film (Hannibal) roles. She has appeared in productions of a number of Baroque operas on stage and on DVD, including the Les Arts Florissants production of Les Indes galantes by Jean-Philippe Rameau, and as Cleopatra in Giulio Cesare, directed by David McVicar, at Glyndebourne in 2005, 2006 and 2009, and in the same production at the Lyric Opera of Chicago in 2007.

At the end of 2006, when De Nederlandse Opera staged the three Mozart-Da Ponte operas conducted by Ingo Metzmacher, de Niese sang Susanna in The Marriage of Figaro and Despina in Così fan tutte. In 2009, de Niese made her Covent Garden debut in The Royal Opera's production of Handel's Acis and Galatea, directed by choreographer Wayne McGregor and recorded on DVD.

Beginning on 31 December 2011 and continuing through January 2012, de Niese appeared as Ariel in The Enchanted Island, a pastiche opera created by Jeremy Sams for the Metropolitan Opera. The performance on 21 January was broadcast worldwide as a MET HD video transmission. She has subsequently returned to the Met as Cleopatra in Handel's Giulio Cesare (2013), Despina in Così fan tutte (2013) and Susanna in The Marriage of Figaro (2014).

In March 2012, de Niese appeared as Norina in Don Pasquale at the San Diego Opera. She performed that role again the following year at the Glyndebourne Festival Opera. In November 2013, she portrayed Poppaea in Handel's Agrippina at the Liceu. In 2014, she appeared as the title heroine in Francesco Cavalli's La Calisto at the Bavarian State Opera, sang Anne Trulove in The Rake's Progress at the Teatro Regio di Turino, and performed the title role in Handel's Partenope at the San Francisco Opera.

In February 2015, de Niese sang Susanna in The Marriage of Figaro at the Hamburg State Opera. In August 2015, she returned to the Glyndebourne Festival Opera in performances of Concepción in L'heure espagnole and the title role in Ravel's L'enfant et les sortilèges. In December 2015, she created the role of Roxane Coss in the world premiere of Jimmy López's opera Bel Canto at the Lyric Opera of Chicago.

2017 saw her stage debut in Australia as Hanna Glawari in Graeme Murphy's production of The Merry Widow for Opera Australia in performances at the Arts Centre Melbourne and the Sydney Opera House, conducted by Vanessa Scammell.

In September 2018, she was featured as the castaway on long-running BBC Radio 4 programme, Desert Island Discs; she selected Barbra Streisand's "Evergreen", F. Scott Fitzgerald's The Great Gatsby and "a slide projector with all the photos she's ever taken of her loved ones" as her chosen favourite track, book and luxury item respectively.

In 2019, she played Aldonza/Dulcinea in Man of La Mancha with English National Opera at the London Coliseum opposite Kelsey Grammer as Cervantes/Quixote, Peter Polycarpou as Sancho, and Nicholas Lyndhurst as the Governor/Innkeeper.

In February 2020, she created the title role in the world premiere of Eurydice, written by Matthew Aucoin with a libretto by Sarah Ruhl, at the Los Angeles Opera. In May 2023, she sang the role of Giulietta in the West End revival of Andrew Lloyd Webber's musical Aspects of Love at the Lyric Theatre, London.

In 2023, she was named number seven on Tatler's best dressed list.

In 2026, de Niese was awarded the Outstanding Contribution to Opera Award at the 2026 Laurence Olivier Awards.

On 15 September 2026, de Niese joined the West End cast of Hadestown, playing the role of Persephone opposite Nathan Sykes as Orpheus and Shaun Dooley as Hades.

== Albums ==
- Semele (2004)
- Handel Arias (2008)
- Raaff (2009)
- The Mozart Album (2009)
- Diva (2010)
- Beauty of the Baroque (2011), with Andreas Scholl, The English Concert conducted by Harry Bicket

== Personal life ==
De Niese (called Danni by her friends and colleagues) married Gus Christie, grandson of John Christie and chairman of Glyndebourne Festival Opera, on 19 December 2009 in St Bartholomew-the-Great, London. Since her marriage, she has lived at Glyndebourne in Sussex. The couple have two children.

In 2015, she was invited to become a patron of the Australian performing arts charity the Tait Memorial Trust.
