= Jean Rodríguez =

Puerto Rican singer (born 1980)

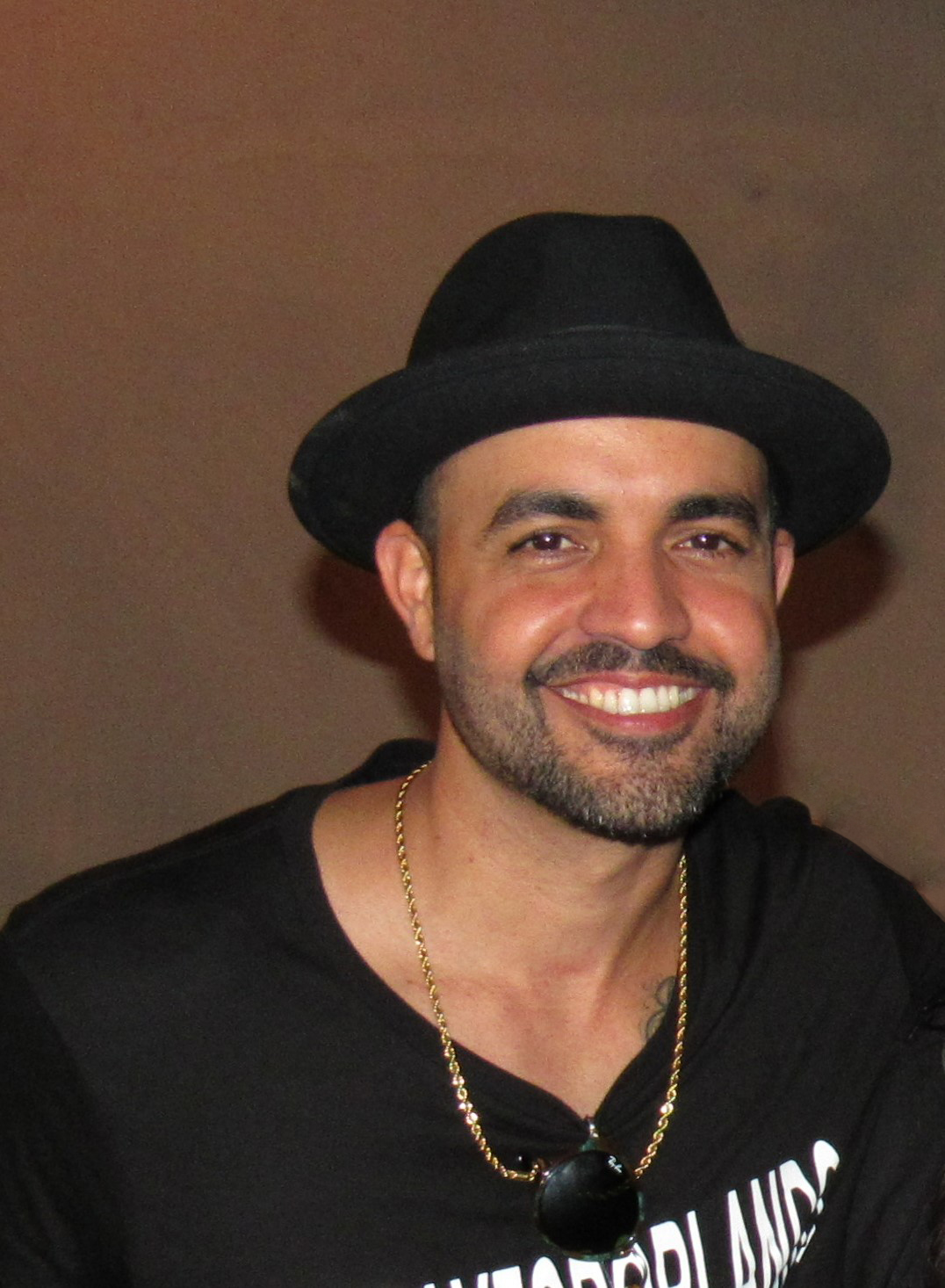
- Rodríguez in 2016

Background information
- Born: Jean Carlos Rodríguez López-Cepero; December 10, 1980 (age 45); San Juan, Puerto Rico, United States
- Origin: Orlando, Florida, United States
- Genres: Latin pop, Latin jazz, salsa
- Occupations: Singer, songwriter, composer, record producer
- Years active: 2001–present
- Labels: A&M, BMG Chrysalis, Sony Music Latin
- Website: jeanmusica.com coastcityvibes.com

Jean Carlos Rodríguez López-Cepero (Spanish pronunciation: [ʝin roˈðɾiɣes]; born December 10, 1980), also known as Jean, is a Puerto Rican singer, the younger brother of Luis Fonsi. Rodríguez has released a handful of solo albums and mixtapes, hitting number one on Billboard's Latin Pop Airplay chart with the single "Duele" in 2006. As a member of the production duo Coastcity, he co-produced the Spanish-language version of "Hey Ma" by Pitbull, J Balvin and Camila Cabello in 2017; the Spanish-language video passed 400 million views on YouTube, and the song was nominated for a Latin Grammy.

Rodríguez sang on Tony Succar's Unity Project, covering Michael Jackson's "Smooth Criminal" and "Billie Jean", and in 2017 he performed "Super Freak" by Rick James for the BMI Los Producers charity ball. The same year, he served as Beyoncé's vocal coach for her Spanish-language remix of the song "Mi Gente". Through Coastcity, he teamed with his brother on the single "Pa La Calle" in 2018.

Rodríguez was named in two Latin Grammy Award nominations. At the 19th Annual Latin Grammy Awards in 2018, he was a contender in the Best Tropical Song category for the song "Me Enamoro Más De Ti", sharing credit with Tony Succar and Jorge Luis Piloto. Two years later at the 21st Annual Latin Grammy Awards, Rodríguez was nominated for Album of the Year for co-producing the Ricky Martin EP Pausa.

== Early life ==
Rodríguez was born in San Juan, Puerto Rico, to Alfonso Rodríguez and Delia López-Cepero. His older brother is Luis Fonsi, and his sister is named Tatiana. His parents sang in the choir Viva la gente (Up with People), and one grandfather played trumpet in Puerto Rico. One grandmother came from the Dominican Republic. Rodríguez sang from age four, and at age six he joined his brother in the San Juan Children's Choir. When he was nine years old, his family left Puerto Rico to move to Orlando, Florida, where Rodríguez continued his schooling. He learned to play trombone, performed with the school jazz band, and sang in the chorus at Dr. Phillips High School. He was influenced by music from Stevie Wonder, Michael Jackson, the Jackson 5, Mint Condition, Brian McKnight and Boyz II Men. Two years younger, Rodríguez idolized his brother Luis and Luis's friend Joey Fatone, wishing he could join their singing group, the Big Guys. Fatone later became famous with boy band NSYNC, while Luis found success in 2008 with "Aquí Estoy Yo", and scored a record-breaking hit with "Despacito" in 2017.

== Career ==
=== S'tilo trio ===
Rodríguez formed a Latin vocal trio called S'tilo with Wes Rodriguez (no relation) and Carlos Mendoza, after the three met in high school choir. Performed with choreographed dance moves, their songs were a blend of hip-hop, pop, Latin and R&B. The trio appeared at local venues such as House of Blues and Hard Rock Cafe. In early 2001, S'tilo went to Los Angeles to sign a recording deal with A&M Records, under the personal attention of label president Ron Fair. The record company's legal team found an earlier act named Steelo, pronounced the same way, so the trio began searching for a new name to avoid confusion. They spent time in the recording studio, but the project was shelved. Rodríguez chose to stay in Los Angeles, collaborating with artists such as Cutfather, Manuel Seal and Robbie Nevil. After two years, he relocated to New York City to perform at Joe's Pub, Village Underground and The Cutting Room. He signed with BMG Chrysalis as a songwriter. Following this, Rodríguez moved back to Florida, this time to Miami where he reconnected with his Latin music roots.

=== Jean ===
In 2005, Rodríguez signed a record deal with Sony BMG Norte, to record and release the album On in April 2006, using the mononym Jean. On was mainly urban R&B with elements of hip hop and tropical music. Two singles came from the album: "Juegas Con Fuego" produced by Jim Jonsin, and "Duele" which hit number one on the Latin Airplay charts. Rodríguez was invited by FIFA to represent the music of Puerto Rico at the 2006 World Cup in Germany.

In 2008, he self-released the mixtape JeaniusMusiq Mixtape followed by the Sony BMG album Out the Box. In 2009 he released another mixtape: Genius To Jeanius. The independent single "Mia" peaked at number 21 on Billboard's Tropical Airplay chart in October 2011. In between these recordings, Rodríguez toured South and North America in 2010 with Marc Anthony in support of Anthony's Iconos album.

In 2012 at the invitation of producer Juan Luis Guerra, Rodríguez assisted as a vocal producer on the live album MTV Unplugged by Juanes. The album debuted at number one on the Billboard Top Latin Albums chart, and won the 2012 Latin Grammy Award for Album of the Year. The next year, Rodríguez co-wrote and co-produced Soy el Mismo for Prince Royce. The album topped the Billboard Latin album chart in October 2013.

The independently released album It's Jean peaked at number 8 on Billboard's Tropical Albums chart in April 2014. The single "Can't Find Love" rose to number 19 on the Tropical Airplay chart in May. Released a year earlier, the lead single "Maquina Del Tiempo" hit number 3 on Tropical Airplay.

For Yandel's 2014 album De Líder a Leyenda, Rodríguez co-wrote the song "En La Oscuridad" for Yandel.

=== The Latin Tribute to Michael Jackson ===
Rodríguez was a major contributor to Tony Succar's Unity Project, a Latin-flavored tribute to Michael Jackson. Rodríguez sang lead vocals on "Billie Jean" and "Smooth Criminal", including a section of Spanish language translation. The album Unity: The Latin Tribute to Michael Jackson was released in early 2015, led by the first single, "Smooth Criminal".

The Unity project gave various live concerts starting with a TEDx presentation at Florida International University in late 2012 which was filmed for DVD release. A special performance was captured on video at the headquarters of SiriusXM satellite radio in December 2015, and a full show was delivered in Aruba at the Caribbean Sea Jazz Festival in September 2016. Rodríguez sang additional songs for these live concerts, including "Man in the Mirror" and "Black or White".

=== Coastcity ===
In 2014 when Rodríguez was considering a third album as Jean, he tapped Puerto Rican–American Danny Flores to produce it. The album was intended to be named Coast City, but as the two began working together, they decided to form a partnership. The duo took the name Coastcity from the abandoned album.

Coastcity was formed as a tropical and Latin soul songwriting team, recalling sounds of the Caribbean, combined with funk and urban R&B. The duo worked with Pitbull and J Balvin to produce the Spanish-language version of the song "Hey Ma", sung by Pitbull, Balvin and Camila Cabello for the film The Fate of the Furious. The Spanish and English versions of the song appear on the soundtrack album, The Fate of the Furious: The Album (2017). "Hey Ma" was certified Gold in the US, 3× Platinum in Spain, and it was nominated for a Latin Grammy. Also in 2017, Rodríguez helped Beyoncé with her Spanish version of the song "Mi Gente" by J Balvin and Willy William. Beyoncé donated her share of the profit to disaster relief efforts in Mexico following the 2017 Puebla earthquake. Rodríguez said Beyoncé was "such a pro", insisting that the two spend more time at her studio in the Hamptons because she knew she could improve her Spanish pronunciation with a little more coaching and personal effort. Coastcity signed with talent agents Atomic Music Group in October 2017.

Coastcity released the singles "Desconocidos" in October 2017 and "Besos Pesos" featuring Girl Ultra in April 2018. Both of these were included on the duo's first album, Coastcity, released in 2018. Other songs on the album include the single "Noche y Manaña" and the Prince-inspired "Countach". Further singles from the duo include the Father's Day special song "Lullaby" in 2018, and the 2019 singles "Salvaje", "Nadie Es Santo", "Juicio Criminal" and "Contigo" – the latter song featuring Fuego and Nat'Lee. Coastcity's EP 1190 was released in 2019. One more single came out of the EP: "Circulo", featuring Cierra Ramirez.

Coastcity released a single in September 2018, "Pa La Calle", featuring Luis Fonsi, Rodríguez's brother. A video of the song shows the brothers having a stylish evening out while Flores drives them around, joining the party. On Vevo, the video attracted more than two million views. "Pa La Calle" was the first time that Rodríguez and Fonsi released a song together.

== See also ==
- List of Puerto Ricans
