= Love Duets =

Love Duets may refer to:

- Love Duets (Toni Gonzaga and Sam Milby album), 2009
- Love Duets (Stephen Costello and Ailyn Perez album), 2014
