= Out the Box =

"Out the Box" may refer to:

- Out the Box (Tonéx album), an album by Tonéx
- Out the Box (Jean album), an album by Jean
- " Out The Box" Out The Box online travel presenter
