= Mimy Succar =

Peruvian singer (born 1961)

- Born: Miriam Tayrako Sakaguchi; 21 September 1959 (age 66); Pueblo Libre, Peru
- Genres: Salsa; Latin jazz; tropical; Japanese music
- Occupations: Singer
- Years active: 1990–present

Miriam Tayrako Sakaguchi (born 21 September 1959), known by her stage name Mimy Succar, is a Peruvian naturalized American singer and musician. She won the 2025 Grammy Awards in the category of Best Tropical Latin Album, with "Alma, corazón y salsa (Live at Gran Teatro Nacional)", an album recorded live with her son Tony Succar at the Gran Teatro Nacional del Perú, including collaboration with 35 guest musicians and artists.

== Early life ==
Miriam Tayrako Sakaguchi was born on 21 September 1959 in the district of Pueblo Libre, Lima Province. Coming from a family of Japanese roots, she lived her early years in the Peruvian-Japanese neighborhood of the district of Lurigancho-Chosica, where she would begin to choose her talent for music.

When she came of age, Succar participated in the local beauty pageant Miss Nikkei Peru, obtaining first place in the competition and became the winner of the 1978 edition. Thanks to her victory, she directly entered the international Miss Nikkei contest in Brazil, where she obtained the title of Miss Congeniality and the award for "Best Traditional Costume." Years later, she would meet the Peruvian pianist and sailor of Lebanese descent Antonio Succar, who would later become her sentimental partner and finally, her current husband.

After getting married, Succar moved with her entire family to Miami in 1989 to start a business new life in the American city. In the first days, Succar was left in charge of her children while her husband worked in a restaurant as a pianist.

== Musical career ==
Some time later, after receiving a proposal from the owner of the aforementioned establishment, Succar formed the musical duo Mistura with her husband in 1990, under the stage name Mimy Succar, using the name Mimy (short for Miriam) and the surname of her in-laws. With her group, she gained popularity in the Latin community of Miami, performing her own songs from her repertoire and performed in different venues such as the Club Peruano Japonés. Over the years, her children Claudia Succar (singer), Brian "Kenji" Succar (music producer) and Antonio "Tony" Succar (percussionist) joined the band, who are also collaborators in her artistic career. In addition, she participated in galas of the Peruvian Association for the children of the San Juan de Dios Clinic and the Esperanza y Caridad Association.

But it was not until 2021, when Succar was invited to the game show "La voz Senior" to surprise her son Tony, who worked as a coach for the aforementioned show. Thanks to this, it has allowed her to be part of the jury cast of the other television production "Perú tiene talento", in addition to participating in different television commercials and performing the cover of the single "No me acostumbro". She was awarded by the TUMI USA Awards in recognition of her musical career in 2022.

In 2023, she released her debut album entitled "Mimy & Tony" with the collaboration of her son, thus managing to establish herself in Peruvian salsa. In said material, she had her version of the musical theme "Quimbara" by Celia Cruz, as well as her own such as "Pa'lante un pié" and "Sin fronteras", the latter in collaboration with La India and Haila Mompié. Thanks to her musical success, she won the "Best New Artist" category from the Luces Awards in 2021. Next, Succar had a brief participation in the Peruvian film No vayan!! in 2023, in which she played herself and participated in a duet with fellow singer Nora Suzuki, vocalist of the musical band Orquesta de La Luz, in the compilation single Sukiyaki. In addition, Succar was part of the film based on her family that premiered on 12 September 2024.

In 2024, Succar announced a collaboration with Gloria Estefan and Sheila E. That same year, she made another collaboration with Bartola to perform the song "Bemba colorá" live, originally included in the album Bailar, which went viral on social media due to the suggestiveness of its lyrics. The song received recognition from the Grammy Awards, winning in the Best Global Music Performance category.

== Discography ==
- 2022: Sin Fronteras
- 2023: Mimy & Tony
- 2024: Alma, Corazón y Salsa (Live at Gran Teatro Nacional)

== Filmography ==
=== Television ===
Year	Title	Role	Channel
2021	La voz Senior	Special guest	Latina Televisión
2021	La voz Generaciones	Jury	Latina Televisión
2022	Perú tiene talento	Jury	Latina Televisión

=== Film ===
Year	Title	Role
2023	No vayan!!	Herself
2024	Mimy & Tony: The Creation of a Dream	Herself

== Awards and nominations ==
Year	Award	Category	Nominated work	Result	Ref.
2021	Luces Awards by El Comercio	Best New Artist	Musical recognition	Won	
2022	TUMI USA Awards	Best Artist	Musical recognition	Won	
2024	Grammy Awards	Best Tropical Latin Album	Mimy & Tony	Nominated	
2025	Grammy Awards	Best Tropical Latin Album	Alma, corazón y salsa (Live at Gran Teatro Nacional)	Won	
2025	Grammy Awards	Best Global Music Performance	"Bemba Colorá" – Sheila E. featuring Gloria Estefan & Mimy Succar	Won	
