= Bel Canto (opera) =

Opera by Jimmy López

Bel Canto is an opera by Peruvian composer Jimmy López. Based on the 2001 novel of the same name by Ann Patchett, the work uses a libretto by Pulitzer Prize-winning playwright Nilo Cruz. The libretto is sung in Spanish, English, Japanese, Russian, German, French, Latin, Italian, and Quechua. It was commissioned by the Lyric Opera of Chicago as part of the Renée Fleming initiative. Sir Andrew Davis conducted the 2015 premiere, and director Kevin Newbury staged the work. The cast included Danielle de Niese as Roxane Coss, J’Nai Bridges as Carmen, Jeongcheol Cha as Hosokawa, and Andrew Stenson as Gen.

== Performance history ==
=== Pre-production ===
The opera underwent several revisions and rewrites as a result of numerous work sessions between composer Jimmy López, librettist Nilo Cruz, director Kevin Newbury, conductor Sir Andrew Davis, and creative consultant Renée Fleming. A workshop took place on July 8–11, 2014 where four out of a total of six scenes were rehearsed with members of The Patrick G. and Shirley W. Ryan Opera Center. A select group of donors and members of the press were invited to attend the last day of the workshop on July 11, 2014. The creative team (this time with soprano Danielle de Niese, bass-baritone Jeongcheol Cha, and pianist Adam Nielsen) met for a final work session and workshop on December 7–9, 2014 at Opera America's National Opera Center. The tech rehearsals took place on the week of July 20, 2015 and the Lyric Opera Chorus began rehearsals in late July under the supervision of chorus master Michael Black.

=== World premiere ===
Bel Canto premiered in Chicago on December 7, 2015, at the Ardis Krainik Theatre of the Civic Opera House, home to the Lyric Opera of Chicago. Since its announcement on February 28, 2012 Bel Canto garnered increasing attention, and it became one of the most awaited world premieres of the 2015–2016 season. It was performed seven times: December 7, 10 and 12, 2015 and January 5, 8, 13 and 17, 2016. The sixth performance was filmed by PBS for a later airing in 2016.

=== Subsequent performances ===
Bel Canto was performed on July 21, 2023, at the Aspen Music Festival and School in Aspen, Colorado. Director Kevin Newbury led this production with the Aspen Chamber Symphony and conductor George Manahan. Composer Jimmy López and librettist Nilo Cruz attended the performance at the Benedict Music Tent.

== Roles ==
Role	Voice type	Premiere cast, December 7, 2015 (Conductor: Sir Andrew Davis)
Roxane Coss	soprano	Danielle de Niese
Carmen	mezzo-soprano	J’nai Bridges
Katsumi Hosokawa	bass-baritone	Jeongcheol Cha
Gen Watanabe	tenor	Andrew Stenson
General Alfredo	tenor	Rafael Dávila
Joachim Messner	baritone	Jacques Imbrailo
Ruben Iglesias	tenor	William Burden
César	countertenor	Anthony Roth Costanzo
Victor Fyodorov	bass	Rúni Brattaberg
Christopf	tenor	John Irvin
Simon Thibault	baritone	Anthony Clark Evans
Father Arguedas	baritone	Takaoki Onishi
General Benjamín	bass	Bradley Smoak
Ismael	tenor	Alec Carlson
Edith Thibault	mezzo-soprano	Annie Rosen
Beatriz	soprano	Diana Newman
Chorus of Guests/Hostages SATB divisi 8-8-8-8
Chorus of Terrorists SATB divisi 4-4-4-4 plus six solo terrorists (two generals plus four named terrorists)

== Instrumentation ==
The work is scored for 3 flutes (2nd and 3rd doubling piccolo), 3 oboes (3rd doubling english horn), 3 clarinets in B-flat (2nd doubling clarinet in E-flat and 3rd doubling bass clarinet), 3 bassoons (3rd doubling contrabassoon), 4 horns in F, 3 trumpets in B-flat and C (2nd doubling pututu in E-flat & A-flat and 3rd doubling piccolo trumpet in A), 3 trombones, tuba, timpani, 3 percussion instrument players, piano (on stage), harp, and strings.

== Staging ==
Director Kevin Newbury led the following group of designers who were in charge of bringing Bel Canto to the stage: set designer David Korins, costume designer Constance Hoffman, lighting designer Duane Schuler, and projection designer Greg Emetaz.
