= Ailyn Pérez =

American opera singer

Ailyn Perez
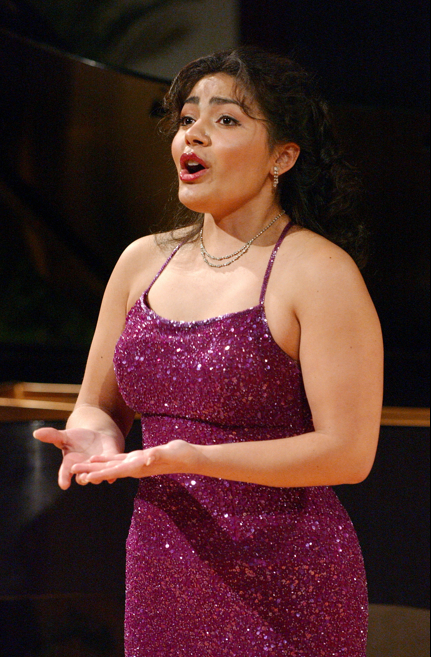
- Born: August 15, 1979 (age 47); Chicago, Illinois, U.S.
- Education: Indiana University Bloomington (BM); Academy of Vocal Arts (GrDip)
- Occupation: opera singer (soprano)
- Years active: 2006–present
- Website: ailynperez.com

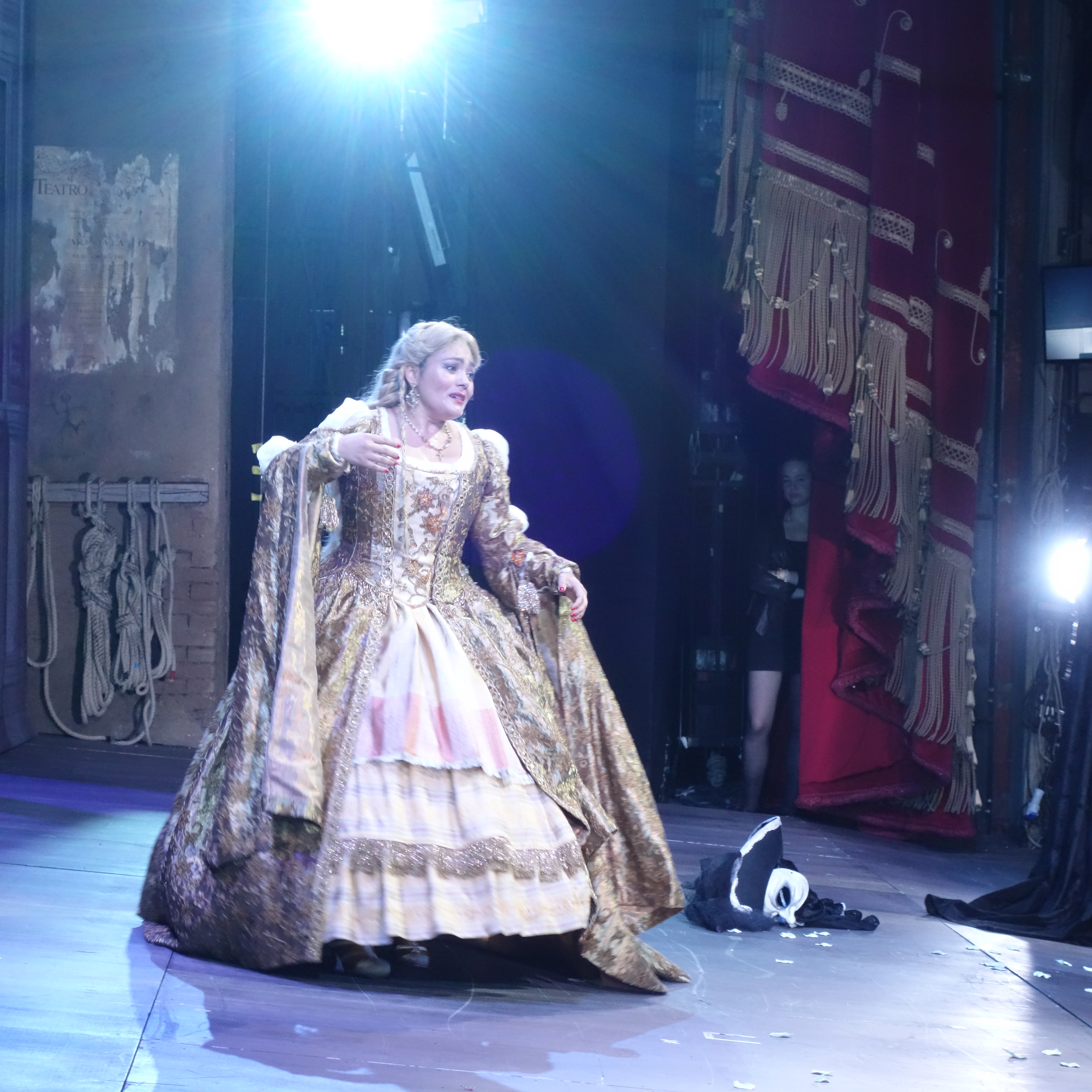
Ailyn Pérez as Elvira in Ernani at Teatro alla Scala, 2018

Ailyn Pérez (born August 15, 1979) is an American operatic soprano known for her interpretation of Violetta, Mimì and Thaïs. She is a 2019 Opera News Awards Honoree, and the winner of the 2012 Richard Tucker Award. In 2016, she received the $50,000 Beverly Sills Award and the 2017 Sphinx Medal of Excellence from the Sphinx Organization.

== Career ==
Pérez, daughter of Mexican immigrants, was born in Chicago and grew up in Elk Grove Village, Illinois, where she graduated from Elk Grove High School. She attended the Indiana University School of Music and the Philadelphia Academy of Vocal Arts, graduating in 2006.

In Autumn 2006, she toured with Andrea Bocelli as the guest soprano.

In 2008, Pérez made her Salzburg Festival debut as Juliette in Roméo et Juliette alongside Rolando Villazón.

Pérez is known as an interpreter of Violetta in La traviata, which she has performed at Deutsche Staatsoper Berlin, Hamburg State Opera, Vienna Staatsoper and Royal Opera House. She has sung as Amelia alongside Plácido Domingo in Simon Boccanegra at the Deutsche Staatsoper and made her debut at La Scala in the same production. In 2010 she appeared as Mimì in La bohème at Cincinnati Opera and also sang the role at New York's Metropolitan Opera in 2016. Her repertory includes roles like the Countess in Le nozze di Figaro, Juliette in Roméo et Juliette, and Micaëla in Carmen.

Highlights in the 2018/19 season included Elvira in Ernani at Teatro alla Scala, Mimì in La bohème at the Metropolitan Opera, Alice in Falstaff at the Metropolitan Opera, Donna Anna in Don Giovanni at the Houston Grand Opera, and Violetta in La traviata at the Bayerische Staatsoper.

In 2023, she sang in Spanish the title role of Florencia in the Metropolitan Opera's premiere of Florencia en el Amazonas.

== Awards ==
She placed second at Operalia in 2006, and at the Loren L. Zachary Competition in 2005. In 2006, she received the Wolf Trap Opera Award, and was given an encouragement award from Opera Index, and she was a winner of the Shoshana Foundation Richard F. Gold Career Grant. She was honored twice by the Licia Albanese-Puccini Foundation, once as a second-place winner in 2004, and again with the Distinguished Achievement Award In 2016. In 2012, she won the Plácido Domingo Award, followed by the Martina Arroyo Foundation Award in 2017.

== Discography ==
- Poème d'un jour. Iain Burnside Rosenblatt Recital. CD, texts and translations, live. OpusArte 2013
- Love Duets (2014) with Stephen Costello
- Great Scott by Jake Heggie and librettist Terrence McNally. (2018)
