= Rocío Quispe Agnoli =

Literary scholar and writer

Academic background
- Education: Brown University
- Thesis: La escritura : remedio contra la violencia "Nueva corónica y buen gobierno" en el discurso colonial hispanoamericano (2000)

Rocío Quispe Agnoli is a Peruvian writer and professor at Michigan State University. She is scholar of Latin American Indigenous and Mestizo literary and cultural studies, colonial and decolonial studies, and Peruvian speculative fiction. She also writes fiction under the pen name Rocío Qespi.

== Education and career ==
Quispe Agnoli received her B.A. in Linguistics and Literature from the Pontificia Universidad Católica del Perú in 1985. In 1987, she obtained a D.E.A. (Dîplome d’Édudes Approfondies) in Linguistique/Sémiotique from the Université de Toulouse-Le Mirail. Later she received her M.A. (1993) and Ph.D. (2000) in Hispanic Studies from Brown University, under the direction of Peruvian writer Julio C. Ortega.

Quispe Agnoli joined the faculty at Michigan State University in 2000 as an assistant professor, and was promoted to full professor in 2015. Throughout her career, her work and activities have received several honors and recognitions. In 2022 she received the William J. Beal Outstanding Faculty Award, and became Affiliated Scholar of The Quechua Initiative on Global Indigeneity at Harvard University.

Between 2020 and 2024 she was the editor-in-chief of the journal Revista de Estudios de Género y Sexualidades / Journal of Gender and Sexuality Studies.

== Work ==
=== Research ===
Quispe Agnoli is known for her work on native Peruvian Indian writer Felipe Guamán Poma de Ayala, as well as Latin American decolonial studies, women’s studies and gender studies, and speculative fiction.

=== Fiction writing ===
Quispe Agnoli is also a fiction writer under the name Rocío Qespi. Her short fiction has received the 1999 “La Regenta” Literary Award (Spain) for “El cuarto mandamiento.”

Her short story “El Cementerio de Acarí” was first runner-up in the 1999 Ana María Matute Short Narrative Award and published in Ellas también cuentan (Torremozas 2000). This work also received the 1999 Asociación Atenea Accésit Award, and it was published in English as “The Cemetery of Acarí” in Metamorphoses: A Journal of Literary Translation.

In 2008 she published her first collection of short fiction Durmiendo en el agua ISBN 9786034516755.

In 2020, her story “El médico de las muñecas” won the Múltiples rostros de la muerte literary competition. which was published in Aeternum. Revista de literatura oscura. In 2021, she joined the Qhipa Pacha Collective, alongside Peruvian authors of science fiction and Peruvian futurism.

== Honors and awards ==
- 2012 Fintz Award for Teaching Excellence in the Arts and Humanities (2012).
- 2013 Successful Peruvian Woman in America. Embassy of Peru in the United States.
- 2013 TUMI USA Award in Professional Excellence, Peruvian Community in the United States.
- 2016 CAL Faculty Leadership Award.
- 2017 Flora Tristán Award for Nobles de papel. Latin American Studies Association-Peru Section.
- 2019 Inspirational Woman of the Year. Professional Achievement.
- 2024: Lifetime Achievement Award.

== Selected publications ==
- Quispe-Agnoli, Rocío (2006). La fe andina en la escritura (in Spanish). Lima: Rocio Quispe-Agnoli. ISBN 978-9972-46-316-7.
- André, María Claudia; Quispe-Agnoli, Rocío (2014). "Mirada de Mujer: narrativas visuales femeninas y narraciones femeninas de lo visual en el mundo luso-hispano". Letras Femeninas. 40 (1). Asociación de Estudios de Género y Sexualidades: 9–17. ISSN 0277-4356. JSTOR 44733684.
- André, Claudia; Agnoli, Rocío Quispe (2015). "Mirrors and Mirages:: Women's Gaze in Hispanic Literature and Visual Arts". Cuaderno Internacional de Estudios Humanísticos y Literatura (in Spanish) (22). Universidad de Puerto Rico en Humacao: 6–10. ISSN 1521-8007.
- Quispe-Agnoli, Rocío (2016). Nobles de papel: identidades oscilantes y genealogías borrosas en los descendientes de la realeza Inca (in Spanish). Madrid: Iberoamericana. ISBN 978-84-8489-888-7.2
- Díaz, Mónica; Quispe-Agnoli, Rocío (2017). Women's negotiations and textual agency in Latin America, 1500-1799. Abingdon, Oxon: Routledge, an imprint of the Taylor & Francis Group. ISBN 978-1-138-22504-6. OCLC 958224481.
- 2020: Más allá de los 400 años: Guamán Poma de Ayala revisitado. Monographic Issue. Letras. Revista de Investigación de la Universidad Nacional Mayor de San Marcos. Vol. 91, n. 133 (2020). Co-edited with Carlos García Bedoya.
- Quispe-Agnoli, Rocío; Brian, Amber, eds. (2022-12-08). Latin American Literature in Transition Pre-1492–1800. Cambridge University Press. doi:10.1017/9781108976893. ISBN 978-1-108-97689-3.
- Quispe-Agnoli, Rocío (2024). Qhipa pacha : futurismo peruano : antología bilingüe = Peruvian futurism : a bilingual anthology (in Spanish). Lima, Perú: Pandemonium Editorial. ISBN 978-612-49465-2-3. OCLC 1479591444.
