= On (Jean album) =

Studio album by Jean
- Released: May 16, 2006
- Genre: Pop, R&B
- Label: Sony Music

Jean chronology
On (2006)	Out the Box (2008)

On is the debut studio album by Puerto Rican singer-songwriter Jean. It was released on May 16, 2006.

== Track listing ==
1. "Duele"
2. "Juegas Con Fuego" (featuring Black Violin)
3. "No Te Puedo Alcanzar"
4. "Vamo' A Chocar" (featuring Black Violin)
5. "Get There"
6. "Spanish Holiday" (featuring Epidemic)
7. "Girls" (featuring Black Violin)
8. "Dulce Café"
9. "Cruel" (featuring M.R.P.)
10. "Ves"
11. "Get There (Acoustic Version)"
