= Mimy & Tony: The Creation of a Dream =

- Theatrical release poster
- Directed by: Tony Succar
- Written by: Tony Succar
- Produced by: Tony Succar
- Starring: Mimy Succar; Tony Succar
- Cinematography: Tony Succar
- Edited by: Tony Succar
- Production company: Unity Entertainment
- Distributed by: Tondero Distribución
- Release date: September 12, 2024
- Running time: 103 minutes
- Countries: Peru; United States
- Languages: Spanish; English

Mimy & Tony: The Creation of a Dream (Spanish: Mimy & Tony: La creación de un sueño) is a 2024 biographical documentary film written, filmed, edited and directed by Tony Succar marking his directorial debut. It follows the life of Mimy Succar, Tony's mother, and her journey in reviving her musical career following her participation in La Voz Perú. It premiered on September 12, 2024, in Peruvian theaters.

== Synopsis ==
Review of the musical career of Tony Succar and his mother Mimy, as they create together Mimy & Tony, an album nominated for a Grammy in the category of Best Tropical Latin Album.

== Accolades ==
Year	Award / Festival	Category	Recipient	Result	Ref.
2024	21st Universe Multicultural Film Festival	Best Feature Documentary	Mimy & Tony: The Creation of a Dream	Won	
2024	14th Latino & Native American Film Festival	Best Feature Documentary	Mimy & Tony: The Creation of a Dream	Won	
2024	Georgia Latino International Film Festival	Best Documentary	Mimy & Tony: The Creation of a Dream	Nominated	
