= Great Scott (opera) =

Opera by Jake Heggie

- Opera by Jake Heggie
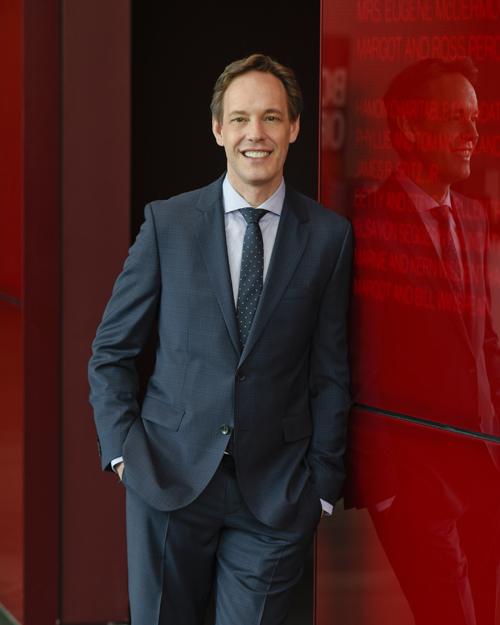
- Jake Heggie
- Librettist: Terrence McNally
- Premiere: October 30, 2015; Winspear Opera House, Dallas

Great Scott is an opera composed in 2015, with music written by Jake Heggie to a libretto by Terrence McNally. This was the duo's first, full-length opera since the premiere of Dead Man Walking in 2000. It was one of three works commissioned by the Dallas Opera in 2015.

In a production starring mezzo-soprano Joyce DiDonato, Great Scott premiered at the Winspear Opera House in Dallas, Texas, on October 30, 2015.

A West Coast premiere of Great Scott by the San Diego Opera opened on May 7, 2016.

== Roles ==
Roles, premiere cast
Role	Premiere cast
Arden Scott	Joyce DiDonato
Tatyana Bakst	Ailyn Pérez
Winnie Flato	Frederica von Stade
Sid Taylor	Nathan Gunn
Roane Heckle	Anthony Roth Costanzo
Eric Gold	Kevin Burdette
Ghost of Vittorio Bazzetti	Kevin Burdette
Wendell Swann	Michael Mayes
Tommy Taylor	Mark Hancock
Anthony Candelino	Rodell Rosel
