= Alma, Corazón y Salsa (Live at Gran Teatro Nacional) =

Live album by Tony Succar and Mimy Succar
- Released: August 16, 2024
- Recorded: Gran Teatro Nacional, Lima, Peru
- Genre: Salsa, bolero, Afro-Peruvian music
- Length: 1:29:00
- Label: Unity Entertainment
- Producer: Tony Succar

Alma, Corazón y Salsa (Live at Gran Teatro Nacional) is a live album by Peruvian musicians Tony Succar and Mimy Succar. It was recorded at the Gran Teatro Nacional in Lima, Peru, and released on August 16, 2024, through Unity Entertainment. The album brought together original songs and covers, and highlighted its combination of salsa, bolero and Afro-Peruvian elements.

The album won the Grammy Award for Best Tropical Latin Album at the 67th Annual Grammy Awards in 2025.

== Background ==
Tony Succar, a Peruvian-American producer and percussionist, has been known for blending Latin genres with orchestral and contemporary arrangements. The collaboration with his mother, singer Mimy Succar, highlights a multigenerational musical partnership rooted in traditional Latin music styles.

== Release ==
Apple Music lists the album as a 14-track release issued on August 16, 2024, with a total length of 1 hour and 29 minutes, and credits it to Unity Entertainment. Qobuz also lists the release under Unity Entertainment Corp., with an August 2024 release date.
