= Blanca Delia Pérez =

Spanish politician

- Born: Blanca Delia Pérez Delgado
- Occupation: Politician

Blanca Delia Pérez (born Blanca Delia Pérez Delgado) is a politician and minister of the Environment of the autonomous Spanish overseas territory of the Canary Islands.

== Biography ==
Blanca Delia Pérez was appointed into the Canary Islands government of Fernando Clavijo Batlle as minister of the Environment on 21 July 2015. In her capacity as minister of environment, Blanca Delia Pérez in 2015 led a delegation from her government to initiate collaboration with the Oceanic Platform of the Canary Islands to address the perennial problem of coastal overflow experienced by communities on the Canary Islands including the municipality of Garachico on the island of Tenerife.

Blanca has worked in the area of social services before becoming a minister. She has served as president of the Social Services Commission in the previous administration of Canary Islands and also as leader of the Commission for Minors. Pointing to some of her achievement working in the area of social services, she mentioned in an interview that her tenure saw the handling of subsidies from non-governmental organisation for people with disability and the facilitation of building of roads to link up communities in her municipality.
