= Out the Box (Jean album) =

Studio album by Jean
- Released: December 9, 2008
- Recorded: August – November 2008; J's House Studios, Miami, Florida
- Genre: Pop, R&B
- Length: 39:48 (Standard edition)
- Language: English, Spanish
- Label: Sony Music
- Producer: Jean Rodríguez, Justin "J-Fly" Daniels

Jean chronology
On (2006)	Out the Box (2008)

Out the Box is the second studio album release by Puerto Rican singer-songwriter Jean and was released on December 9, 2008, in digital-only format by Sony BMG. The album consists of ten tracks, five of them in English and another five translated in Spanish.

== Background ==
According to Jean's MySpace profile, the purpose of the album's unique format (with five English songs and five Spanish-translated songs) was to appeal more to the American audience, both English and Spanish-speaking people. The album was released in digital-only format, and sold on the iTunes Store, Rhapsody and Microsoft's Zune Marketplace in three different formats. The standard version is sold on Rhapsody, another version is sold on iTunes with two bonus tracks, and another version is sold on the Zune Marketplace with two other different bonus tracks.

Although Jean has been signed to a major record label since 2006, both On and Out the Box have received very little promotion, and promotion for the albums depend solely online mainly through MySpace and iTunes. On January 20, 2008, however, two of the album tracks, "Stop the Clock" and the Spanish version "Peligro de Extinción" were released on iTunes as both the "Single of the Week" and the "Canción de la Semana" (Song of the Week).

== Track listing ==
=== Standard edition ===
1. "Stop the Clock" (Jean Rodríguez, Justin Daniels, Yandy & Dave Karmiol) — 4:26
2. "Ay Amor" (English version) (Jean Rodríguez, Yasmil Marrufo & Jose Casals) — 4:01
3. "Voices In My Head" (Javier Negron, Jesus Collazo, Jean Rodríguez, Justin Daniels, Jose Casals & Zorimar Colón) —
4. "Take You There" (Jean Rodríguez, Justin Daniels & Jose Casals) — 3:34
5. "Shooting Star" (Kiko Cibrian, Jean Rodríguez, Yasmil Marrufo & Jose Casals) — 3:34
6. "Peligro de Extinción" (Spanish version of "Stop the Clock") (Jean Rodríguez, Justin Daniels, Yandy & Dave Marimol) — 4:26
7. "Ay Amor" (Spanish version) (Jean Rodríguez & Yasmil Marrufo) — 4:01
8. "Voices In My Head" (Spanish version) (Javier Negron, Jesus Collazo, Jean Rodríguez, Justin Daniels, Jose Casals & Zorimar Colón) — 4:19
9. "Arriésgate" (Spanish version of "Take You There") (Jean Rodríguez, Justin Daniels & Jose Casals) — 3:34 D
10. "Electridad" (Spanish version of "Shooting Star") (Kiko Cibrian, Jean Rodríguez, Yasmil Marrufo & Jose Casals) — 3:34

=== Bonus tracks ===
iTunes bonus tracks

11. "Sin Decir Adiós" (Jean Rodríguez & Yasmil Marrufo) — 4:49
12. "Mucho Cuidado" (Sergio Raúl Granados, Jean Rodríguez & Kiko Cibrian) — 3:19

Zune Marketplace bonus tracks

11. "Mi Universo" — 4:09
12. "Respirar" — 4:07
