= Chen Tianzhuo =

Chinese contemporary artist

- 陈天灼
- Born: 1985 (age 40–41); Beijing, China
- Education: Chelsea College of Art and Design, Central Saint Martins College of Art and Design
- Known for: Outlandish performance, video art, installation art
- Website: http://tianzhuochen.com/

Chen Tianzhuo (Chinese: 陈天灼; born 1985) is a Chinese contemporary artist known for outlandish performance art, films, and installations.

== Life and work ==
Chen was born in Beijing in 1985. He has been described as "one [of] the most promising young artists in China."

He received a BA in Graphic Design from Central Saint Martins College of Art and Design in 2009, and an MA in Fine Art from Chelsea College of Arts in 2010.

In 2015, he founded ASIANDOPEBOYS, a Beijing-based interdisciplinary collective for art, music, dance, and fashion.

His work has been shown internationally, and is exhibited primarily in China and Europe.

His latest work debuted November 6, 2014 at K11 in Hong Kong supported by Adrian Cheng. The show titled WAWADOLL IS X’MAS DATA—a solo exhibition by TIANZHUO CHEN is "Chen’s first solo exhibition in Hong Kong is also his first large-scale installation outside of a gallery" and is curated by Leap Magazine and Art Papers Editor in Chief, Robin Peckham.

Chen lives and works in Beijing. He is a Tibetan Buddhist.

== Solo exhibitions ==
Year	Title	Venue	City	Country
2023	Illuminated Spirits	TANK	Shanghai	China
2022	The Dust	Kunstpavillion	Innsbruck	Austria
2021	The Shepherd	Kyoto City University of Arts	Kyoto	Japan
2020	Recollection Pierces the Heart	Tang Contemporary	Hong Kong	China
2019	TRANCE	M Woods Museum	Beijing	China
2019	Backstage Boys	BANK	Shanghai	China
2017	GHOST	Kunsthalle Winterthur	Winterthur	Switzerland
2016	Tianzhuo Chen	Chi K11 Art Museum	Shanghai	China
2016	Ishvara	Long March Space	Beijing	China
2015	Tianzhuo Chen	Palais de Tokyo	Paris	France
2014	PICNIC PARADI$E BITCH	BANK	Shanghai	China
2013	Tianzhuo’s Acid Club	Star Gallery	Beijing	China
2012	Gas Station	Vanguard Gallery	Shanghai	China
2011	The Great Exhibition			

== Group exhibitions ==
=== 2014 ===
- "MEMOIRS OF AMNESIAC-!", MAISON POPULAIRE, Paris
- "2014 Wuhan 3rd Documentary Exhibition of Fine Arts", Hubei Museum of Art, Wuhan
- "Conditions", Destination, Beijing
- "MÉMOIRES D’UN AMNÉSIQUE – ?", MAINSD’ŒUVRES, Paris
- "SANKUANZ FW2015 Collection", London Fashion Week, London
- "Decorum", Powerstation of Art, Shanghai
- "SANKUANZ FW2014 Collection", Shanghai Fashion Week, Shanghai

=== 2013 ===
- "Drawing-Expression and limit", Amnua, Nanjing
- "Wave" Bund 18, Shanghai
- "Hot City" L-Artgallery, Chengdu
- "Eric Cartman’s Loser Club" Art Beijing, Beijing
- "Kangrinboqê－SANKUANZ FW2013 Collection", Shanghai Fashion Week, Shanghai
- "Existence – +Follow" Shanghai MOCA, Shanghai

=== 2012 ===
- "Kathmandu International Art Festival", Kathmandu
- "Narcissism" Star gallery, Beijing
- "Being misread on 16th October", Bridge gallery, Beijing
- "Get it Louder 2012", Beijing
- "The Graduals", Traffic, Dubai
- "First Issue", SH Contemporary, Shanghai
- "Also World", T Art Center, Beijing
- "Spot Light", Bund 18, Shanghai
- "Nowhere to Live", Star Gallery, Beijing
- "The Halo Effect", V Art Center, Shanghai
- "Yeast″, Season gallery, Beijing

=== 2011 ===
- "Asia Triennial Manchester", Manchester
- "Peckham 90210″, N/V Projects, London
- "UK CHINA Art&Design Festival-The catalyst", Great western studios, London
- "Parallax Art Fair", La Galleria, Royal Opera Arcade, London
- "Life is elsewhere", Crypt gallery, London

=== 2010 ===
- "Wild Wicked and Wanton", The Lewisham Arthouse, London
- "MA Show 2010″, 1st Sept-5th Sept, Chelsea college of art, London
- "Royal Academy summer exhibition", 14Jun-22 Aug, Royal Academy, London
- "Chelsea MA interim show", Chelsea college of art, london
- "Askew show- in the garden of desire", The castle, London
- "Condensation", Hanbury hall, london
- "Chelsea salon", Auto-Italia south east, london

=== 2009 ===
- "Chelsea salon", Auto-Italia south east, london
- "Cheers", Barge house, London
- "CSM Degree show", Barge house, London
- "CSM work in progress show", Colomb gallery, London

=== 2008 ===
- "Hot Shock", Shanghai
- "Foundry", London
- "China Design now", V&A Museum, London

=== 2007 ===
- "Flow", 798 Space, Beijing.
- "Tiger Translate", X-Change Gallery, New York, Berlin and Beijing.

=== 2006 ===
- "Chinese shadow", Shanghai Biennale, Shanghai.

== See also ==
- Robin Peckham
