= Blanca de Gassó y Ortiz =

Spanish writer and poet

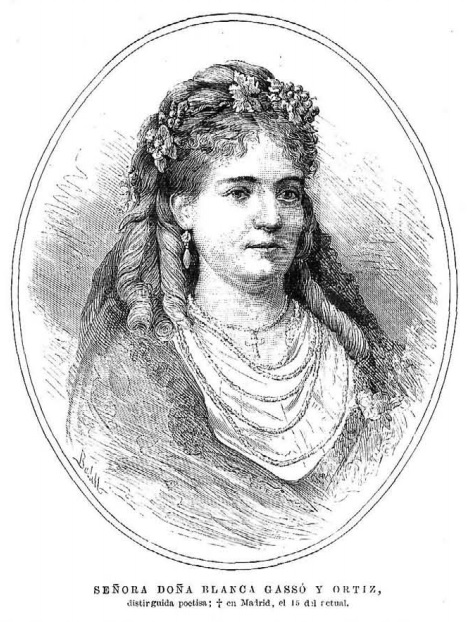
- Portrait in La Ilustración Española y Americana (Madrid, 1877)
- Born: 26 November 1846
- Died: 15 April 1877 (aged 30); Madrid, Spain
- Occupations: writer; poet
- Writing career
- Notable work: Almanaque de Salón

Blanca de Gassó y Ortiz (26 November 1846 – 15 April 1877) was a 19th-century Spanish writer and poet.

== Biography ==
Blanca's father, Jacinto Gassó, was a merchant whose store, "El Bazar del Globo", was located on the lower floor of the family home. He maintained tight control over his daughter's life, although he allowed her to socialize in literary circles and work as a writer. The chroniclers of the time described Blanca as a tall, slender, blonde, and beautiful young woman, but her father scared away all her suitors.

Gassó became a widower on April 5, 1877. On April 8, he shot his daughter in the head with a revolver while she was sleeping and then did the same to himself, committing suicide. It was rumored that Blanca had fallen in love with a suitor and was willing to marry although Jacinto was vehemently opposed to courtship. Admitted to the Hospital Universitario de la Princesa in Madrid, Blanca remained conscious during the first days, married her beloved in article mortis, dictated her will leaving all her assets, and personally requested her last rites. She died on April 15, 1877, in Madrid.

The newspapers echoed the tragedy and the death of "the distinguished poetess." After her murder, sales of her works and her collections of poems increased, but over the years she fell into oblivion.

== Career ==
She published a Almanaque de Salón (Salon Almanac) for some years and collaborated in some of Madrid's periodicals such as La Lira, La Garnalda, La Moda Elegante, El Bazar, and El Correo de la Moda. She was a member of the Asociación de Escritores y Artistas Españoles (Association of Spanish Writers and Artists) and of the Real Sociedad Económica Matritense de Amigos del País (Economic Society Matritense). She was the author of works such as Corona de la infancia: lecturas poéticas y canciones para niños (Crown of childhood: poetic readings and songs for children) (1867) and Cien cantares a los ojos (One hundred songs to the eyes), in addition to dramatic pieces such as a praise to the Dos de mayo (Two of May) (1873), and the comedy El primer vuelo (The First Flight) and the tragedy Numancia.

== Selected works ==
- El amigo de las damas : almanaque de salón y tocador para señoras y señoritas publicado para el año 1875 (1875)
- Corona de la infancia: lecturas poéticas y canciones para niños, 1867 (text)
- Cien cantares a los ojos (1871) (text)
- Dos de mayo: loa, 1873 (text)
- El primer vuelo
- Numancia
