= Blanca del Rey =

Spanish flamenco dancer and choreographer (born 1949)

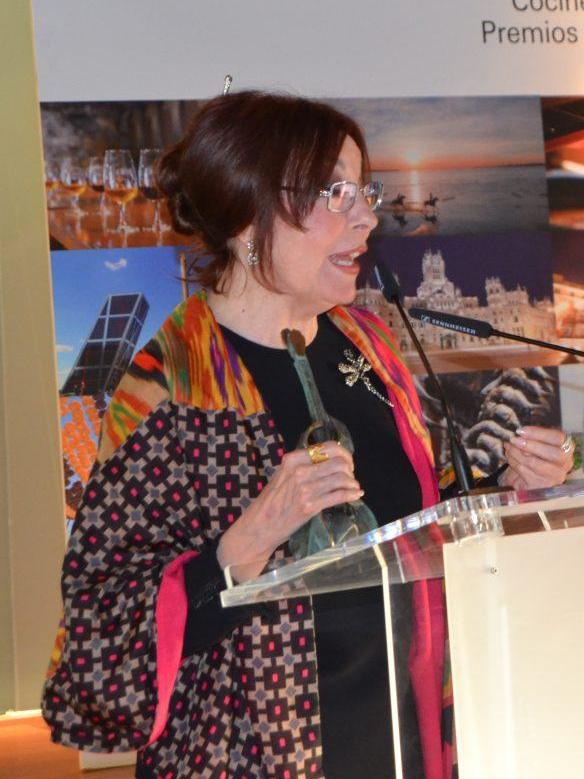
- Blanca del Rey (2018)
- Born: Blanca Ávila Moreno; 1949 (age 75–76); Córdoba, Spain
- Occupations: flamenco dancer; choreographer; tablao co-proprietor
- Spouse: Manuel del Rey
- Career
- Dances: shawl soleá

Blanca Ávila Moreno (childhood stage name, Blanquita Molina la Platera; adult stage name, Blanca del Rey; Córdoba, 1949) is a Spanish flamenco dancer and choreographer. Known for her shawl soleá, Rey received the Gold Medal of Merit in Fine Art from the King and Queen of Spain.

== Biography ==
Blanca Ávila Moreno's vocation for dancing was evident from a very young age. When she was only six years old, she won several flamenco dance competitions, which led her to perform at the Gran Teatro de Córdoba with great success. From that moment on, she began her career. At the age of twelve, she made her professional debut at the Cordoba tablao El Zoco. In her beginnings, as a dancer in the Cordovan flamenco scene, she was known as "Blanquita Molina la Platera", a nickname she took from the street where she lived, La Plata.

At the age of 14, she went to Madrid, where she performed in Cuevas de Nemesio and later in El Corral de la Morería, tablao where most of the greats of flamenco art have performed. In this place, she met the owner, Manuel del Rey, the man who would later become her husband, from whom she took her definitive artistic name. Her marriage entailed her retirement for a certain period of time from the world of dance. During those years, she dedicated herself to studying the evolution of flamenco, which allowed her to internalize the dance and she underwent a transformation that revolutionized her idea of dance.

After about ten years, when her two children were grown, she begins to perform sporadically in El Corral de la Morería, making her definitive return. She presented her most evolved choreographies in which the roots of flamenco are captured in all its purity in her very personal way of interpreting the alegrías of Córdoba, the caña (flamenco), or her particular guajira. But what has created a school in the history of flamenco was her unique choreography of the shawl soleá.

Rey has performed her art all over the world and has been honored in countless places. She has developed shows and performed with artists such as Maya Plisetskaya, Pete Schauffuss, Silvia Guillén, and Trinidad Sevillano. The writer Rafaela Sánchez Cano has included Rey in her work, Mujeres de Córdoba.

== Awards and honours ==
In 2019, she received a tribute at the Cata Flamenca de Montilla. In 2020, the Flamenco Research Award was dedicated to Rey in Jerez de la Frontera. She is also a National Award for Flamenco (Premio Nacional de Flamenco) laureate, and a recipient of the Gold Medal of Merit in Fine Art from the King and Queen of Spain.
