= Atomic Music Group =

International boutique talent agency

Atomic Music Group (AMG) is an international boutique talent agency based in Los Angeles. It is one of the largest independent talent agencies in the United States with 26 full time agents in five cities and two countries, representing over 300 clients.

== Background ==
Originally called Electric Artists, the company was founded in Dallas by current CEO Scott Weiss in 1989. He was a former All American tennis player at the University of Houston his freshman year of college turned professional at the age of 19 and was a world ranked ATP professional tennis player for four years. He also was a former employee of the legendary Texas band ZZ Top and ZZ top's manager, Bill Ham.

== History ==
The Reverend Horton Heat, from Dallas, was one of Electric Artist's earliest clients and remains a client. Early employees of AMG included Melody King, formerly of The Agency Group, and Tom Hoppa, formerly of Agency for the Performing Arts (APA). In 1993, Weiss and two employees moved AMG to Sausalito, California south of San Rafael. In 2000 the company rebranded changing the name to Atomic Music Group (AMG).

In 2012, Davis McLarty merged his company, Three Chord Touring Agency in Austin, Texas, naming McLarty as president. He brought with him notable clients including Dale Watson, Kelly Willis, The Derailers, and Parker Millsap. In 2013, Weiss began a division focusing on the emerging alternative Latin music scene welcoming industry veteran Enrique Bravo as president of the newly formed AMG Latin. Bravo brought with him established legacy Latin clients Celso Pena and emerging superstars Jenny and the Mexicats among many other artists. Today, AMG offices include AMG West, anchored by president Brando Terrazas, AMG Midwest anchored by senior vp Josh Davis, AMG Texas anchored by chairman Davis McLarty, and AMG East anchored by vp Zack Harting. AMG Canada is run by AMG Canada president James Maclean. Notable clients include FEAR, The Reverend Horton Heat, The 5.6.7.8's, Electric Six, HorrorPops, NRBQ, Voivod, and The Amish Outlaws.
