= Love Duets (Stephen Costello and Ailyn Perez album) =

Studio album by Stephen Costello and Ailyn Pérez
- Released: 2014
- Genre: Classical music, Crossover
- Label: Warner Classics

Love Duets is a 2014 classical and crossover album that features the American opera singers Stephen Costello (tenor) and Ailyn Pérez (soprano). Released on Warner Classics, the BBC Symphony Orchestra and conductor Patrick Summers accompany Costello and Perez, who were married at the time of the album.

== Track listing ==
1. Manon: "Toi! Vous! ... N'est-ce plus ma main"
2. L'amico Fritz: "Suzel, buon dì" (Cherry Duet)
3. Rigoletto: "Signor ne prinicipe"
4. L'elisir d'amore: "Esulti pur la Barbara"
5. Faust: "Il se fait tard"
6. La traviata: "Un dì felice"
7. La bohème: "O soave fanciulla"
8. West Side Story: One Hand, One Heart"
9. Carousel: "If I Loved You"
10. Guys and Dolls: "I'll know"
11. Kismet: "And This Is My Beloved"
