= Ardis Krainik =

American singer

Ardis Joan Krainik (March 8, 1929 – January 18, 1997) was an American mezzo-soprano opera singer who was the general director of the Lyric Opera of Chicago for 15 years.

== Background ==
Krainik was born and raised in Manitowoc, Wisconsin, the daughter of businessman Arthur Krainik, of Czech origins, and Clara Bracken Krainik, a native of Chicago and the daughter of an immigrant Norwegian family. She had an older sister, Elizabeth, and never married. Her Norwegian great-grandfather, Martin Brækkan, had been an oboist with a military band in his native Trondheim.

She attended the public schools of Manitowoc and graduated from Northwestern University's School of Speech (B.S., 1951) intending to become a teacher. It was at Northwestern that she was encouraged to pursue a career in voice. Northwestern awarded her the honorary degree of Doctor of Fine Arts in 1984.

== Career ==
Following her graduation from college, Krainik took a job as a clerk-typist with the Lyric Opera and eventually was selected to sing secondary mezzo-soprano roles onstage with numerous opera luminaries. In 1965, under the leadership of general director Carol Fox, she became artistic administrator, a position she held until the Board appointed her general director after Fox's dismissal in 1981. She served as general director from 1982 until her death in 1997. She was appointed a member of the National Endowment for the Arts and also served as chairman of Opera America in the mid-1990s.

Under Krainik's leadership, the Lyric Opera was able to put its fiscal house in order after many years of running in the red. In 1991 she made headlines when she fired Italian tenor Luciano Pavarotti for yet another cancellation due to his being "indisposed." Krainik endeared herself to Chicago's opera patrons, who had been disappointed by one too many of Pavarotti's last-minute cancellations.

At a 1996 Gala celebrating Krainik's 43-year career at the Lyric, the 3,563-seat Art Deco house was renamed the Ardis Krainik Theatre in honor of her lifetime of contributions to the Lyric Opera, including a $110 million renovation of the second largest opera auditorium in North America (after New York's Metropolitan Opera) in 1993. The Gala, hosted by Plácido Domingo, did not include Luciano Pavarotti, who had not been invited. In 1996, she received the Chicago History Museum "Making History Award" for Distinction in the Performing Arts.
