= Blanca of Navarre =

Blanca of Navarre or Blanche of Navarre may refer to:

- Blanca Garcés of Navarre (died 1156), wife of King Sancho III of Castile
- Blanca Sánchez of Navarre, Countess of Champagne (died 1229), also Blanche de Navarre
- Blanche of Navarre, Duchess of Brittany (1226–1283), daughter of Theobald I of Navarre & wife of John I, Duke of Brittany
- Blanche d'Évreux (1331–1398) also Blanche de Navarre, second wife of Philip VI of France
- Blanche I of Navarre (1387–1441), Queen of Navarre
- Blanche II of Navarre (1424–1464), Queen of Navarre
