= Jimmy López =

Peruvian classical music composer

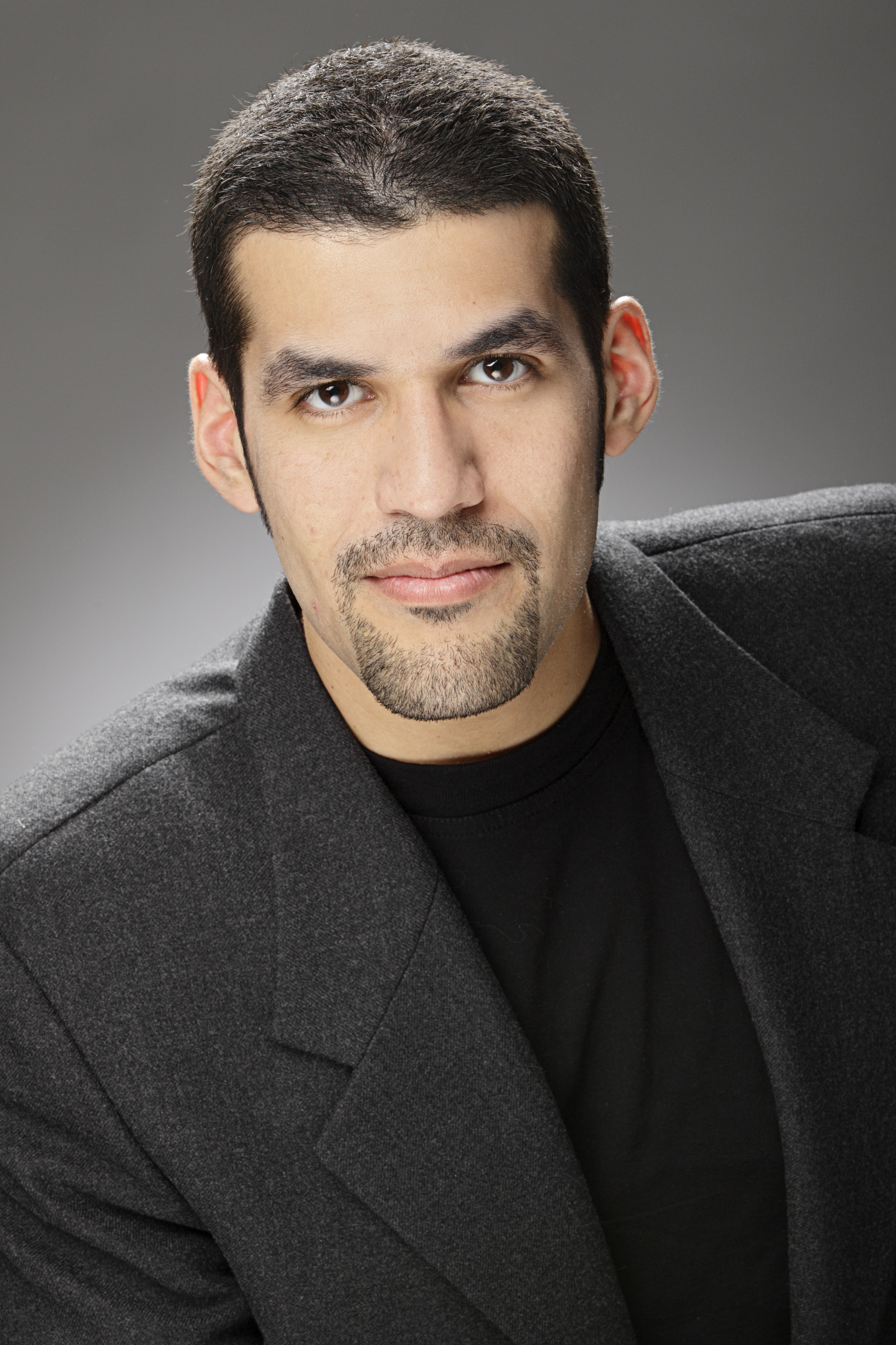
Jimmy López in 2009

Jimmy López (born 21 October 1978) is a classical music composer from Lima, Peru. He has won several international awards and has been nominated to a Latin Grammy Awards. Pieces composed by him have been performed by the Chicago Symphony Orchestra, Philadelphia Orchestra, Detroit Symphony Orchestra, Boston Symphony Orchestra, Fort Worth Symphony Orchestra, National Symphony Orchestra of Peru, Helsinki Philharmonic Orchestra, MDR Leipzig Radio Symphony Orchestra, Sydney Symphony Orchestra, Houston Symphony, and Orchestre Philharmonique de Radio France. His works have been performed at Carnegie Hall, Sydney Opera House, Gewandhaus Leipzig, and during the 2010 Youth Olympic games in Singapore. His music has been featured in numerous festivals, including Tanglewood Music Festival, Aspen Music Festival, Grant Park Music Festival, Darmstadt International Course for New Music, and Donaueschingen Music Festival.

== Education ==
During his childhood and early youth, Jimmy López studied at Colegio Santa María Marianistas, a Catholic-Marianist school in Santiago de Surco, Lima Perú. In 1998, López began studying at the National Conservatory of Music in Lima, where he worked with the Peruvian composer Enrique Iturriaga. In 2000 he moved to Helsinki to study at the Sibelius Academy with Veli-Matti Puumala and Eero Hämeenniemi. After being awarded a Master of Music degree, he was admitted to University of California, Berkeley. He obtained his PhD in Composition in 2012 from UC, Berkeley He has participated in masterclasses with Magnus Lindberg, Brian Ferneyhough, Michael Nyman, Jouni Kaipainen, Jonathan Harvey, Betsy Jolas and Marek Kopelent, among others.

== Career ==
In 2004, a ballet, "Los Magos del Silencio" ("The Magicians of Silence") was produced in Lima and López's "Concerto for Koto and Orchestra" was performed by the Dutch UMA Kamerorkest (Chamber orchestra). In 2005, a work for four recorder players and three percussion players, "Kraftmaschine", was commissioned by the German A*Devantgarde festival. In March 2007, López presented several works, "A Wedding Blast", "Varem", "Epiphany" and "América Salvaje" ("Wild America") at a concert held in Helsinki's Temppeliaukion kirkko. The compositions included use of traditional Peruvian instruments such as the pututo and the ocarina and inspired by Peruvian culture. "América Salvaje" was commissioned by the Ministry of Education on the occasion of the opening of the Biblioteca Nacional del Perú (National Library of Peru) in 2006.

2013 saw the premieres of four works by López: "Lord of the Air", cello concerto, performed by Jesús Castro-Balbi and the TCU Symphony conducted by Germán Gutiérrez; "Ccantu", for piano, performed by Priscila Navarro at her debut recital in Carnegie Hall; "Perú Negro", dedicated to Miguel Harth-Bedoya and the Centennial Season of the Fort Worth Symphony Orchestra; and "Warped Symmetry" by flutist Sami Junnonen during the Hanko Music Festival in Finland. His work "Synesthésie" was recorded by Pierre-André Valade and the Orchestre Philharmonique de Radio France in November 2012 for the radio program Alla Breve.

On August 14, 2015, an album dedicated entirely to his orchestral works was released under the Harmonia Mundi record label. The pieces included are "Perú Negro", "Lord of the Air", "Synesthésie" and "América Salvaje", all of them performed by Conductor Miguel Harth-Bedoya and the Norwegian Radio Orchestra (KORK).

His opera Bel Canto premiered in Chicago on December 7, 2015, at the Ardis Krainik Theatre of the Civic Opera House, home to the Lyric Opera of Chicago. Jimmy López is published by Filarmonika and Birdsong.

In 2019 he premiered "Dreamers" an oratorio which he wrote in collaboration with Pulitzer Prize-winning Playwright Nilo Cruz. It was premiered by soprano Ana María Martínez, Conductor Esa-Pekka Salonen and the Philharmonia Orchestra. He was Composer-In-Residence at the Houston Symphony between 2017 and 2020, premiering two large orchestral works, "Aurora: concerto for violin and orchestra" with Leticia Moreno as soloist, and "Symphony No. 2: Ad Astra" conducted by then Music Director Andrés Orozco-Estrada. Both works were recorded commercially and released by Pentatone (record label) in January 2022. "Aurora" was nominated to a Latin Grammy in the Best Classical Contemporary Composition category. In addition, he mentored six young composers by spearheading the Resilient Sounds project, which highlighted the plight of local refugees through six original multi-disciplinary projects.

The Chicago Sun-Times has called him "one of the most interesting young composers anywhere today." while Opera News has called him an "undeniably exciting composer". The New Yorker has hailed his "virtuoso mastery of the modern orchestra" and the Dallas Morning News his "brilliant command of orchestral timbres and textures".

== Works ==
The date is the date of composition rather than publication or first performance.

=== Orchestral or ensemble ===
- Symphony No. 6: Monarch (2025)
- Symphony No. 5: Fantastica (2024)
- Symphony No. 4: Eclipse — I. First Contact (2023)
- Aino, tone poem for orchestra (2022)
- Symphony No. 3: Altered Landscape (2020)
- Rise, for orchestra (2020)
- Symphony No. 2: Ad Astra (2019)
- Pago a la Tierra (2019)
- Bel Canto: A Symphonic Canvas, for orchestra (2017)
- Symphony No. 1: The Travails of Persiles and Sigismunda (2016)
- Man and Man, for countertenor and ensemble (2015)
- Perú Negro, for orchestra (2012)
- Synesthésie, for orchestra (2011)
- Avec Swing, for chamber ensemble (2010)
- Fiesta! for orchestra (2008)
- Fiesta! for chamber orchestra (2007)
- América Salvaje, symphonic poem (2006)
- A Wedding Blast, for orchestra (2005)
- Los Magos del Silencio, ballet for children (2004)
- Carnynx, for orchestra (2002)
- Aires de Marinera, for big band (2002)

=== Solo instrument and orchestra or ensemble ===
- Ephemerae, concerto for piano and orchestra (2021)
- Aurora, concerto for violin and Orchestra (2017)
- Guardian of the Horizon, concerto grosso for violin, cello and strings (2017)
- Lord of the Air, concerto for cello and orchestra (2012)
- Lago de Lágrimas, concerto for flute and orchestra (2009/2010)
- Epiphany, concertino for piano, brass, strings and percussion (2007)
- Varem, concerto for koto and orchestra (2004)
- Arco de Luz, for tenor saxophone and wind ensemble (1999)

=== Chamber works ===
- Airs for Mother, for mezzo-soprano and string quartet (2022)
- Where Once We Sang, for mezzo-soprano and piano (2020)
- Amauta, for baritone and piano (2019)
- Ladybug, for solo guitar (2016)
- Perú Negro, version for 2 pianos & 2 percussion players (2015)
- Man and Man, version for countertenor and piano (2015)
- Viaje a ti, for soprano and piano (2010)
- Warped Symmetry, for solo flute (2011)
- Ccantu, for solo piano (2011)
- 15 Études for String Octet (2010)
- Of Bells and Broken Shadows, for cello and piano (2009)
- Särmä, for accordion and piano (2009)
- Incubus III, for clarinet, percussion and live electronics (2009)
- Incubus II, for alto sax, baritone sax, pno and perc (2008)
- Incubus, for alto saxophone, accordion and double bass (2008)
- Kraftmaschine, for 4 recorders 3 percussions (2005)
- Lesbia, for soprano, alto, piano and 5-string double bass (2005)
- La Caresse du Couteau, for string quartet (2004)
- K'asa, for violin and piano (2003)
- Speculorum, for oboe and koto (2002)
- Vortex, for piano solo (2001)
- El Viaje, for clarinet, cello and piano (2000)
- Trio, for 2 clarinets and bassoon (1999)
- Three Lieder, for tenor and piano (1998)

=== Opera ===
- Bel Canto (2015)
- Dreamers, an oratorio for orchestra, chorus, and soprano (2018)

== Awards ==
- 2001 Boston University Alea III International Composition Prize (USA)
- 2002 CCA International Composition Competition Orchestra Prize (Taiwan)
- 2005 Honourable Mention, Irino Prize for Chamber Music (Japan)
- 2006 Stipendienpreis for Composition (Germany)
- 2006 SävellYS Composition Prize (Finland)
- 2008 2nd Prize – Nicola de Lorenzo Prize (UC Berkeley)
- 2008 Morton Gould Young Composer Award (given by ASCAP: The American Society of Composers, Authors and Publishers)
- 2008 Kranichsteiner Musikpreis at the Darmstadt International Course for Contemporary Music, Germany.
- 2009 Georges Ladd Prix de Paris (UC Berkeley)
- 2011 1st Prize – Nicola de Lorenzo Music Composition Contest (UC Berkeley)
- 2012 1st Prize – Nicola de Lorenzo Music Composition Contest (UC Berkeley)
- 2013 Prince Prize – Awarded to Lyric Opera of Chicago and the composer by the Prince Charitable Trusts
- 2014 Premio Antara – Lima Contemporary Music Festival
- 2015 Special Mention – Casa de las Américas Composition Prize
- 2015 Honorable Mention - Barlow Prize
- 2015 Premio Luces
- 2016 TUMI USA Award in the "Arts & Culture" category
- 2017 Hewlett Foundation's Hewlett50 Arts Commissions
