= Blanca Rosa Vilchez =

American journalist

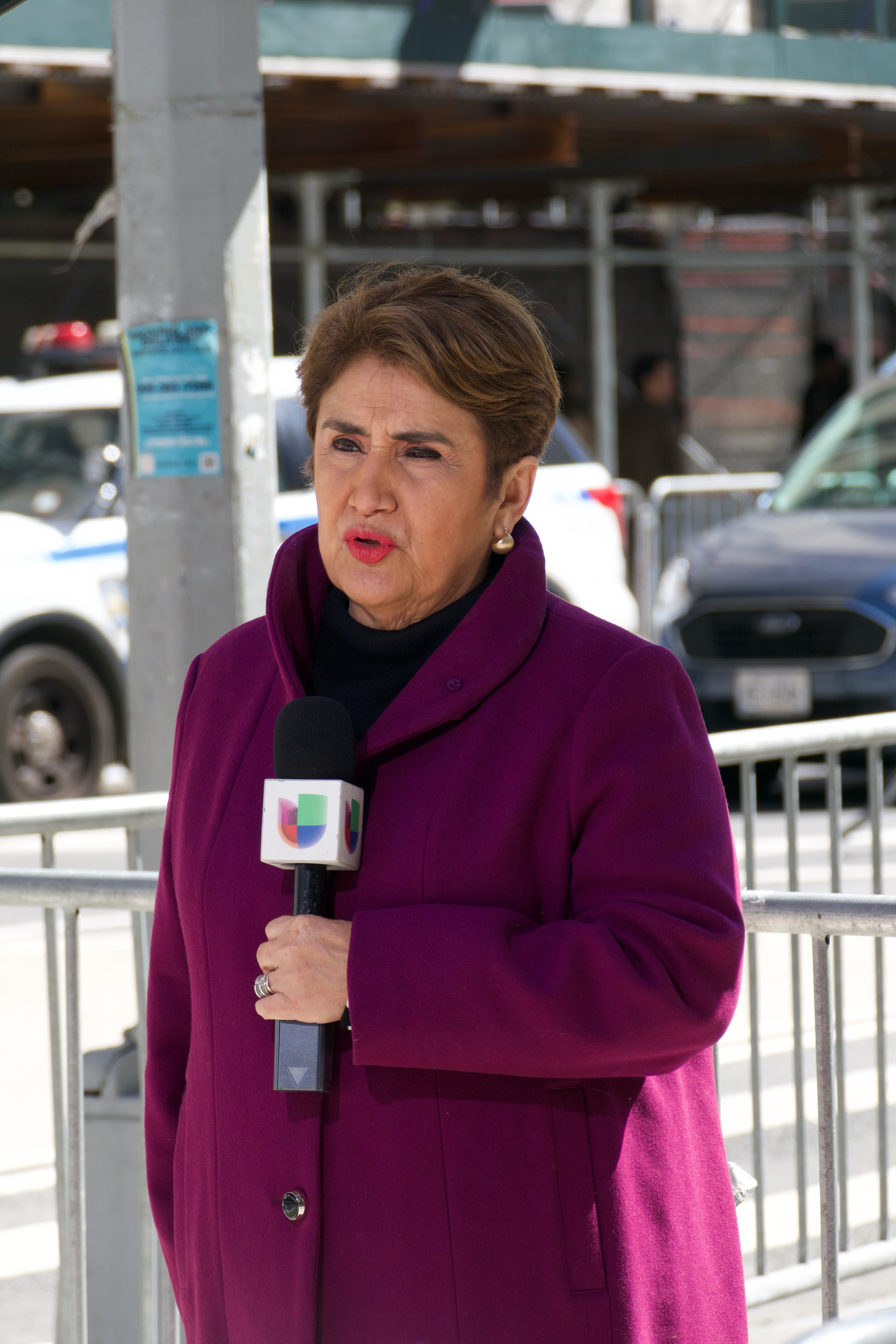
Vílchez reporting on the Prosecution of Donald Trump in New York in April 2024

Blanca Rosa Vílchez (born c. 1951) is a Peruvian-born Hispanic journalist in the United States. She has resided in New York City since 1984.

== Biography ==
Blanca Rosa Vílchez studied at the National University of San Marcos, the oldest university in the Americas.

Her journalism career began in Lima, Peru, in 1973. She was the first female news director in Peru when, at the age of 22, she directed 90 Segundos (90 Seconds) a daily newscast.

She has been reporting for Univision since 1987 from New York.

She is known for her coverage of the September 11 attacks against the Twin Towers of the World Trade Center in New York City. Images have been captured of her running from the towers as they collapsed behind her. Her coverage of this story earned her an honorable mention from the Academy of Science and Television. In 2019, she donated the blouse and jacket that she wore while covering the attacks to the National Museum of American History.

She is the senior national correspondent from New York on Noticiero Univision, the newscast most viewed by Latino Americans. The newscast reaches 95% of Hispanic Americans living in the United States, with nearly three million viewers every night.
