= Kevin Ceballo =

American singer (born 1977)

- Born: October 12, 1977 (age 48); Manhattan, New York
- Genres: Salsa
- Occupation: singer
- Years active: 2000–present
- Website: Kevin Ceballo's Official Website

Kevin Ceballo (born October 12, 1977) is a salsa music singer of Puerto Rican descent.

== Early life and education ==
Ceballo's parents moved from Puerto Rico and settled in Manhattan where Ceballo was born. They were Seventh-Day Adventists and as such Ceballo was exposed to and enjoyed the gospel singing at his House of Worship. In his household "salsa" and other types of popular music were considered taboo, this however did not keep young Ceballo from listening to Latin music, which he secretly enjoyed, behind his parents back. During his teen years he came more and more into contact with the music he would grow to love.

Ceballo attended the famed High School of the Performing Arts in New York. There he dreamed of pursuing a career in singing and acting. At times when he was not in school, Ceballo would sing as back-up for any local salsa group that would require his services.

== Singing debut ==
In 1997, Ceballo caught the attention of pianist Isidro Infante, while singing at a local night club. Infante was impressed with Kevin and asked him if he would like to join his group as one of the lead singers. He took Infante up on his offer and soon was featured in the CD recording "Licencia Para Engañar" (License to Deceive), which was released in 1998. The CD included "Cuando Pienso en Tí" (When I think of You), composed by Ceballo. He traveled all over the world with Infantes band.

La India, a Puerto Rican salsa singer, asked Ceballo to sing back-up for her CD "Sobre el Fuego" (On the Fire), which was nominated for a Grammy Award.

== Solo debut ==
External audio
- You may listen to Kevin Ceballo sing "Amame O Dejame" here.

The year 2000, was the year that Ceballo made his debut as a solo singer, when he recorded his CD 'Mi Primer Amor" (My First Love). The CD also featured two other compositions by him, "Que Clase de Hombre" (What kind of Man) and "Quiero Bailar" (I want to Dance). His CD became a number one hit in the Latin music charts. Ceballo was named "New Artist of the Year'. Besides singing with La India, Ceballo had also performed with Celia Cruz, Tito Puente and Eddie Palmieri.

On October 20, 2002, Ceballo headlined a free concert at the Verizon Music Festival held in Washington, D.C., with the participation of the late Celia Cruz. On April 11, 2003, Ceballo played with Jimmy Bosch at the Copacabana Nightclub in New York. That year he also recorded "Yo Soy Ese Hombre" (I'm that Man) which was produced by Infante. The album included "Eternamente Te Amaré", a salsa interpretation of the Angela Via and Frankie Negrón duet recorded in 2000. On June 26, 2004, Ceballo performed as the headliner in the "Latino Fest" celebrated at Patterson Park in Baltimore, Maryland.

== See also ==
- List of Puerto Ricans
