= Michael Stuart (singer) =

American salsa singer and actor

- Born: January 13, 1975 (age 51); New York City, New York, US
- Genres: Salsa; Latin pop; Puerto Rican music
- Occupations: Singer; songwriter; actor
- Years active: 1996–present
- Labels: RMM; Machete; Bonilla Records

Michael Stuart (born January 13, 1975) is an Puerto-Rican salsa singer, songwriter and actor.

== Early years ==
Stuart was born in New York City, to Puerto Rican parents who settled in the 1960s after moving from Puerto Rico. Stuart received his primary and secondary education in Arecibo Puerto Rico. He was musically influenced by his uncle Israel Stuart. Stuart grew up listening to hip hop and rock music. He grew to love many kinds of music, especially Latin music. Stuart would accompany his uncle to many rehearsals where he would sing and play the maracas or congas. He taught himself to play the trumpet and most of the times he would sing to the tones of Héctor Lavoe and El Gran Combo. It was Domingo Quiñones who had influenced Stuart's style of singing.

== Singing career ==
With the help of his uncle, it was not long before Stuart was singing back-up to the likes of Johnny Rivera and Marc Anthony. In 1996, Stuart recorded his first CD, Cuento de la Vecinidad (Tale of the Neighborhood), which included a remake of Michael Jackson's "The Lady in My Life". His debut CD was a hit in the Hispanic community. He was awarded the Farandula Magazine "New Artist of the Year 1996–97 Award" and The Tropical New Artist 1997 Award by the Tu Musica Awards and was nominated for the "New Artist of the Year" at the Lo Nuestro Awards in 1997. That year Stuart also sang in a Banco Popular production honoring Bobby Capó, featuring Danny Rivera, José Feliciano, and Chucho Avellanet. In 1998, Stuart recorded his second CD, Retratos (Pictures). Among the awards that he won for this recording were the "New Salsa Artist Award" and the Paoli Award. He also debuted in the Puerto Rican version of the musical play Jesus Christ Superstar in San Juan, alongside Olga Tañón. Stuart was awarded the "Best New Actors Award" by the Theater Circle for his performance. In the 1998 Banco Popular production honoring composer Rafael Hernández, Stuart sang alongside Ricky Martin and Gilberto Santa Rosa. In 1999, Stuart received a special recognition from the House of Representatives of Puerto Rico, and he also received the "Peoples Choice Award" in the Tropical category at the Tu Music Awards.

In 2000, Stuart released his third album, Subeme el Volumen (Bring up the Volume). That year he sang "Algo En Ella" ("Something in Her") for the film soundtrack of Under Suspicion, a movie that included the participation of Miguel Ángel Suárez and Nydia Caro. The soundtrack also included songs by fellow Puerto Ricans Carlos Ponce, Ednita Nazario and Olga Tañón. Stuart also sang two songs in Obra Maestra (Masterpiece) by Eddie Palmieri and the late Tito Puente.

In 2002, Stuart released his fourth CD, Michael Stuart. In 2004, Stuart released the Latin Pop album Sin Miedo, which was nominated for Latin Grammy Awards of 2005 for Best Tropical-Contemporary Album of the Year. In 2005, he starred in a musical event titled Homenajes that toured throughout the United States, South America, and Europe, paying tribute to historic performers of Latin music. In 2006, Stuart released Back to da Barrio, which is a salsa album of notable reggaeton songs sung by other reggaeton artists, such as "Ven Bailalo", "Pobre Diabla", and "Mayor Que Yo"...

Stuart is active in the music business and participates on stage productions in Puerto Rico. Stuart participated in a beach festival named "Back to School", on August 9, 2008.

== Discography ==
- 1996: Cuentos de la Vecindad (RMM Records)
- 1998: Retratos (RMM Records)
- 2000: Súbele el Volumen (RMM Records)
- 2002: Michael Stuart (RMM Records/Universal Music Latino)
- 2004: Sin Miedo (RMM Records/Universal Music Latino)
- 2006: Back To Da Barrio (Machete Records)
- 2006: Grandes Exitos (CD & DVD) (RMM Records/Universal Music Latino)
- 2006: Pura Salsa (RMM Records/Universal Music Latino)
- 2007: Sentimiento De Un Rumbero (Machete Records)
- 2011:Tributo a Louie Ramirez (Amanece y Sigue Caliente) (RLM Productions)

== See also ==
- List of Puerto Ricans
