= Cave Canem Foundation =

Nonprofit organization supporting African-American poets

- Logo of the Cave Canem Foundation
- Founded: 1996; 30 years ago
- Founder: Toi Derricotte and Cornelius Eady
- Type: Nonprofit organization
- Tax ID no.: 13-3932909
- Purpose: Cultivating the artistic and professional growth of Black poets
- Headquarters: Brooklyn, New York, U.S.
- Key people: Lisa Willis (Executive Director); Dante Micheaux (Artistic Director)
- Website: cavecanempoets.org

Cave Canem Foundation is an American 501(c)(3) organization founded in 1996 by poets Toi Derricotte and Cornelius Eady to remedy the underrepresentation and isolation of African-American poets in Master of Fine Arts (MFA) degree programs and writing workshops across the United States. It is based in Brooklyn, New York.

Cave Canem programs include an annual summer retreat, regional workshops, first- and second-book poetry prizes, anthology publication and national readings and panels. The organization has also published two anthologies, Gathering Ground: A Reader Celebrating Cave Canem’s First Decade, edited by Derricotte and Eady (University of Michigan Press, 2006), and The Ringing Ear: Black Poets Lean South, edited by Nikky Finney (University of Georgia Press, 2007).

In September 2016, the National Book Foundation awarded Cave Canem the Literarian Award for service to the American literary community.

== History ==
Founded in 1996 by poets Toi Derricotte and Cornelius Eady, Cave Canem Foundation began as a week-long writing retreat for selected African-American poets at Mount St. Alphonsus Conference Center in Esopus, New York. According to Derricotte, the idea grew out of previous attempts she had made to create programs supporting Black poets at New York University in the early 1980s and University of Pittsburgh in the early 1990s; she shared her vision with Eady and Sarah Micklem, which led to the St. Alphonsus retreat. Since then, Cave Canem "has grown from an initial gathering of 26 poets to become an influential movement with a renowned faculty and a high-achieving national fellowship" of over 300. The Foundation's name, Cave Canem, is Latin for "Beware of the Dog" and refers to a sign that Derricotte spotted while visiting the House of the Tragic Poet in the volcanic ash covered city of Pompeii. Derricotte retired as co-director in 2015.

== Programs ==
Writing for The New York Times in 2015, Stephanie Burt described Cave Canem as "a major incubator for the current renaissance in black poetry, which includes the poets Tracy K. Smith, who won the 2012 Pulitzer Prize in poetry; Afaa Michael Weaver, who won the Kingsley Tufts prize last year; and, most recently, Claudia Rankine, who won the National Book Critics Circle Award for poetry this year."

=== Retreat ===
Currently held annually at the University of Pittsburgh at Greensburg, Pennsylvania, Cave Canem’s tuition-free retreat is a week of faculty-led writing workshops and poetry readings for African-American poets. Accepted applicants (fellows) may participate for a maximum of three summers within a five-year period. Past faculty have included Presidential Inaugural poet Elizabeth Alexander; Pulitzer Prize winner Yusef Komunyakaa; National Book Award finalists Patricia Smith and Carl Phillips and 2011 National Book Award winner Nikky Finney.

=== Book prizes ===
Cave Canem Foundation sponsors two annual book prizes. One is the Cave Canem Poetry Prize, awarded for an exceptional first book by an African-American poet and published by the University of Pittsburgh Press; Natasha Trethewey won the inaugural prize in 1999 for her collection Domestic Work. Other winners have included Lyrae van Clief-Stefanon (2001) and Donika Kelly (2011) for her book, Bestiary.

The second is the Cave Canem Northwestern University Press Poetry Prize, a second-book award established in 2009 that "celebrates and publishes works of lasting cultural value and literary excellence" by African-American poets. It is awarded every other year.

=== Legacy conversations ===
Established in 2001, these moderated discussions feature poets and scholars who "have played historic roles in African-American poetry." Participants have included Nobel Laureate Derek Walcott, Pulitzer Prize winner Rita Dove, and poet and activist Amiri Baraka.

=== Poets on Craft series ===
Launched in 2008, Poets on Craft features “award-winning poets in the early-to-middle stages of their careers. Poets meet in moderated conversation, discussing aesthetics, the role of the contemporary poet and other topical issues.” Participants have included National Book Critics Circle Award finalist Major Jackson and Walt Whitman Award winner Suji Kwock Kim.

=== Regional workshops ===
Established in 1999, workshops for emerging poets of color are held semi-annually in New York City and, more recently, in Columbia, South Carolina, in partnership with the South Carolina Poetry Initiative. Instructors have included former Poet Laureate of Connecticut, Marilyn Nelson, Whiting Writers' Award winner Tyehimba Jess, and American Book Award winner, Kimiko Hahn.

== Awards ==
In 2016, Cave Canem became the first organization (rather than individual) to win the National Book Foundation's Literarian Award for service to the American literary community. The National Book Foundation's executive director Lisa Lucas said: "Cave Canem’s innovative and effective literary activism has been transformative to the world of letters. Their ongoing commitment to provide supportive channels for African American poets to thrive has yielded works that enrich the world’s literary culture."

== Published works ==
- 2006: Gathering Ground: a Reader Celebrating Cave Canem's First Decade ISBN 9780472099245 OCLC 62133808
- 2007: The Ringing Ear: Black Poets Lean South ISBN 9780820329253 OCLC 71369370

== Former fellows (partial list) ==
- Opal Palmer Adisa
- Samiya Bashir
- Reginald Dwayne Betts
- Tara Betts
- Roger Bonair-Agard
- Jericho Brown
- Mahogany L. Browne
- Gloria Burgess
- Mary-Alice Daniel
- Aya de Leon
- Kyle Dargan
- Camille Dungy
- Vievee Francis
- Ross Gay
- Alysia Nicole Harris
- francine j. harris
- Reginald Harris
- Yona Harvey
- Terrance Hayes
- M. Ayodele Heath
- Ashaki Jackson
- Major Jackson
- Tyehimba Jess
- Amanda Johnston
- A. Van Jordan
- Bettina Judd
- Douglas Kearney
- John Keene
- Donika Kelly
- Nate Marshall
- Adrian Matejka
- Airea Dee Matthews
- Shara McCallum
- Constance Merritt
- Dante Micheaux
- Lenard Moore
- Tracie Morris
- Harryette Mullen
- John Murillo
- Angel Nafis
- Mendi Obadike
- Khadijah Queen
- Gregory Pardlo
- Morgan Parker
- Danez Smith
- Patricia Smith
- Rose M. Smith
- Frank X Walker
- Phillip B. Williams
- Yolanda Wisher
- Bianca Spriggs
- Lyrae van Clief-Stefanon
- Arisa White

== See also ==
- CantoMundo
- Furious Flower Poetry Center
- Kundiman
