= Soul Mountain Retreat =

Coordinates: 41.4353°N 72.3320°W

The Soul Mountain Retreat is a writer's colony in East Haddam, Connecticut, USA.

== History ==
The retreat was established in 2004 with a grant from the University of Connecticut College of Liberal Arts and Sciences by the writer and former Connecticut poet laureate Marilyn Nelson. The idea for creating the retreat grew out of the Cave Canem workshops.

Soul Mountain offers fellowships to "emerging and established poets" with an emphasis on supporting writers belonging to traditionally underrepresented racial or cultural groups.

The non-profit organization has established partnerships with African Continuum Theater Company, Cave Canem, Kundiman, the University of Connecticut, Sarah Lawrence College, New York University, and the University of Wisconsin at Madison.

== Past Fellows ==
Past fellows have included Samiya Bashir, Sherwin Bitsui, Kwame Dawes, LeAnne Howe, Tara Betts, Ahimsa Timoteo Bodhran, Allison Hedge Coke, Harryette Mullen, Bushra Rehman, and Afaa M. Weaver.
