= Cornelius Eady =

American writer and poet (born 1954)

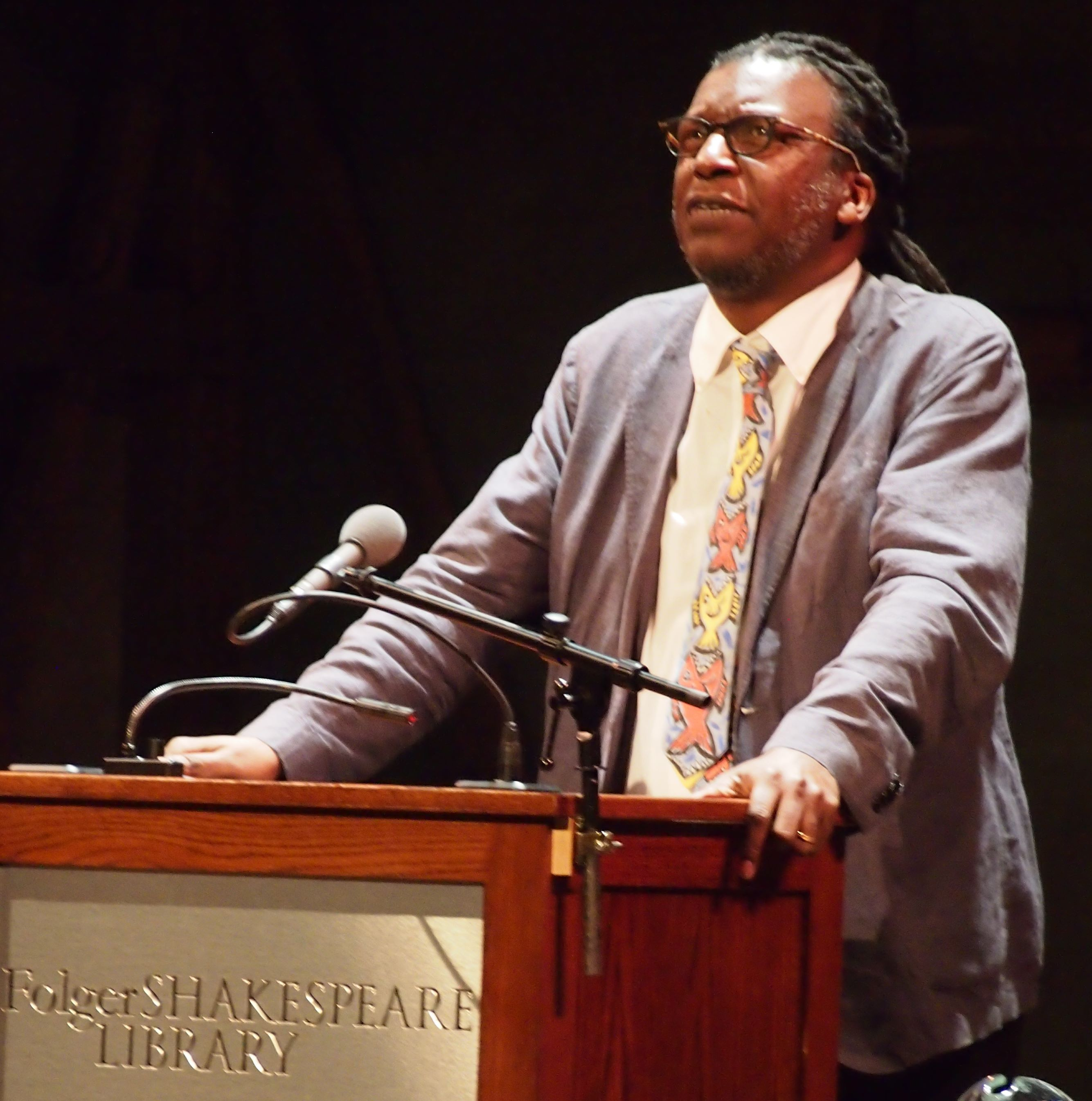
- Reading at Folger Shakespeare Library, 2014
- Born: 1954 (age 71–72); Rochester, New York, U.S.
- Spouse: Sarah Micklem
- Writing career
- Genre: Poetry
- Movement: Co-founded Cave Canem Foundation

Cornelius Eady (born 1954) is an American writer focusing largely on matters of race and society. His poetry, often praised for its simplicity and plainspokenness, centers on jazz and blues, family life, violence, and societal problems stemming from questions of race and class. He is a co-founder of the Cave Canem fellowship for poets of the African diaspora.

== Biography ==
Cornelius Eady was born in Rochester, New York, and is an author of seven volumes of poetry. In most of Eady's poems, there is a musical quality drawn from the blues and jazz.

Honors awarded to Eady include the Strousse Award from Prairie Schooner, a Lila Wallace-Reader's Digest Writers' Award, and individual Fellowships from the Rockefeller Foundation, the John Simon Guggenheim Memorial Foundation, and the National Endowment for the Arts.

In 2001, his poetry collection Brutal Imagination was a finalist for the National Book Award.

In 1996, Eady and fellow poet Toi Derricotte founded the Cave Canem Foundation, a nonprofit organization for black poets.

Eady collaborated with jazz composer Diedre Murray in the production of several musical theater pieces, including You Don't Miss Your Water (1997), Running Man (1999), Fangs, and Brutal Imagination. Peter Marks, writing in The New York Times, described Running Man as "operating at the exotic juncture where chamber musical, jazz session and opera might converge." Running Man was a finalist for the Pulitzer Prize for drama in 1999.

Eady's work has also appeared in Blackbird, an online journal of literature and the arts.

Eady has taught at Sarah Lawrence College, New York University, The Writer's Voice, The College of William and Mary, University of Notre Dame, and Sweet Briar College. He was an associate professor of English and Director of the Poetry Center at State University of New York at Stony Brook and Distinguished Writer-in-Residence at the City College of New York, as well as the Miller Chair in Poetry at University of Missouri. As of 2025, he serves as a professor of English and holds one of the Tennessee Chairs of Excellence at the University of Tennessee-Knoxville. He is married to novelist Sarah Micklem.

After voting for Zohran Mamdani in the 2025 New York City mayoral election, Eady was selected to perform an inaugural poem at the mayor-elect's inauguration on January 1, 2026. The poem was excerpted in The New York Times on December 30, 2025.

== Works ==
Eady's first book of poetry, Kartunes, was published in 1980, followed by several other books of poetry. He is also the author of Victims of the Latest Dance Craze, which won the 1985 Lamont Poetry Prize of the Academy of American Poets; BOOM, BOOM, BOOM: A Chapbook (1988); The Gathering of My Name; You Don't Miss Your Water; and the autobiography of a jukebox (Carnegie Mellon, 1997), among other publications.

Eady's 2001 collection of poetry Brutal Imagination was a finalist for the National Book Award in Poetry. One of his most popular works, Brutal Imagination comprises two cycles of poems, each confronting the same subject: the black man in white America. The first cycle, which carries the book's title, is narrated largely by the "imaginary black man that Susan Smith blamed for kidnapping her two children when in fact she had strapped her babies into the back of their family car and pushed the car into John D. Long Lake and let them drown. It took nine days for the authorities— the FBI and the sheriff— to break her story and so the premise is that for those nine days, that man is alive and walking among us, and it's a big what if: What if he could talk? What if he had the ability to speak? What would he have told us?" The second cycle, "Running Man", focuses on the African-American family and the barriers of color and class. The title character represents every African-American male who has crashed into these barriers.

== Bibliography ==
- Kartunes. West Orange, N.J.: Warthog Press. 1980.
- Victims of the Latest Dance Craze: Poems, Ommation Press, 1986, ISBN 9780941240024; Carnegie Mellon University Press, 1997, ISBN 9780887482540
- BOOM, BOOM, BOOM: A Chapbook, State Street Press, 1988
- The Gathering of My Name, Carnegie Mellon University Press, 1991, ISBN 9780887481154
- You Don't Miss Your Water: Poems, Henry Holt, 1995, ISBN 9780805036688; Carnegie Mellon University Press, 2004, ISBN 9780887484162
- The Autobiography of a Jukebox: Poems, Carnegie Mellon Press, 1997; Carnegie Mellon University Press, 2007, ISBN 9780887484704
- Brutal Imagination: Poems. G. P. Putnam's Sons. 2001. ISBN 9781101143575.
- Hardheaded Weather: New and Selected Poems. Penguin. 2008. ISBN 9780399154850.
- The War Against the Obvious, Jacar Press, 2018, ISBN 978-0-936481-27-2

=== List of poems ===
Title	Year	First published	Reprinted/collected
"Emmett Till's glass–top casket"	2020	The New Yorker, July 27, 2020	
"Proof"	2025	Written for Zohran Mamdani's inauguration as mayor of New York. Excerpted in The New York Times, December 30, 2025.	
