= Samiya Bashir =

American writer

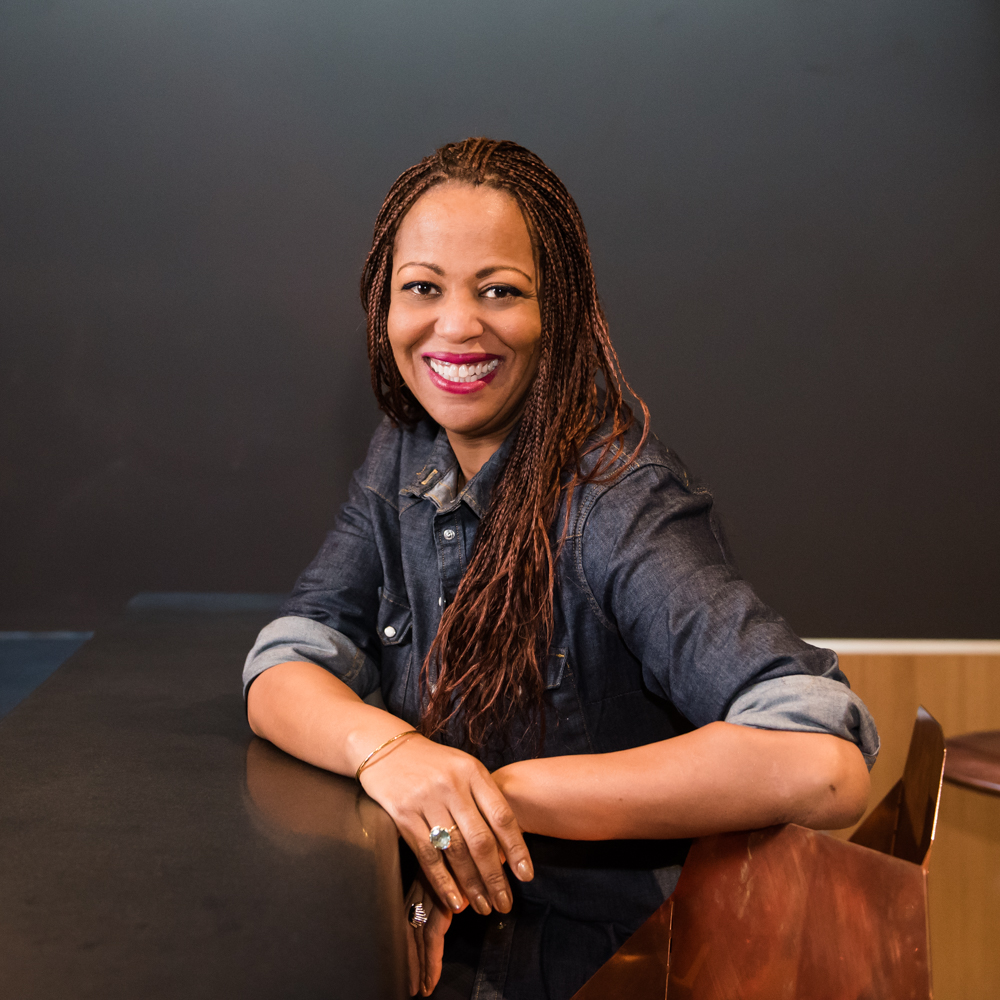
- Bashir in 2019
- Born: Ypsilanti, Michigan
- Education: University of California, Berkeley (BA); University of Michigan, Ann Arbor (MFA)
- Occupations: Poet, author, professor, multimedia artist
- Writing career
- Language: English
- Genre: Poetry
- Notable works: Field Theories (2017); Gospel (2009); Where the Apple Falls (2005)
- Notable awards: Rome Prize; Oregon Book Award; Astraea Literary Award; Pushcart Prize; Hopwood Poetry Award; Poet Laureate of the University of California
- Website: samiyabashir.com

Samiya A. Bashir is a queer American artist, poet, and author. Much of Bashir's poetry explores the intersections of culture, change, and identity through the lens of race, gender, the body, and sexuality. She is currently the June Jordan visiting professor at Columbia University of New York. Bashir is the first black woman to receive the Joseph Brodsky Rome Prize in Literature. She was also the third black woman to serve as tenured professor at Reed College in Portland, Oregon.

Bashir moved to Los Angeles where she became involved in theatre, before pursuing a career in writing. She attended the University of California and became the institution's poet laureate in 1994. After leaving California and moving east, Bashir worked in magazine publishing and briefly taught high school. After moving to New York City in 1997, she continued to write poetry and essays, publishing three full-length collections of poetry.

== Biography ==
=== Early life and education ===
Samiya Bashir was born in Ypsilanti, Michigan. Her mother Pamela Adelle Hilliard, an African-American woman from Detroit, and her father Abdirahman Mohammed Bashir, a first generation Somali immigrant, met at Eastern Michigan University. Samiya is the eldest of six children, and became an avid writer at a young age. She later attributed some of her academic interests to the influences of her parents, Bashir's father taught science and math, while her mother taught language arts.

She moved to Los Angeles at the age of 19, where she took college classes and explored performance and theatre. It was during this time that she became actively involved in the local LGBT community, working first for the local radio station KWKW-LA and then for the Gay & Lesbian Community Services Center during the 1992 Los Angeles riots.

Inspired by the work of June Jordan and Toni Morrison, Bashir decided to focus on writing, and moved to the Bay Area after the 1992 riots. She transferred to the University of California, Berkeley where she studied and taught as part of Jordan's Poetry for the People program. Bashir graduated magna cum laude with a bachelor's degree in the Literature of American Ethnic Cultures from Berkeley in 1994. She was named poet laureate of the nine campuses of University of California that same year. She graduated from the University of Michigan, Ann Arbor with a Master of Fine Arts in 2011.

=== Career ===
After Berkeley, Bashir wrote and performed poetry in the Bay Area. In 1995, Bashir helped found The Black Girl Collective with other black lesbian and bisexual artists. In 1996, Bashir took the winnings from an SF Guardian Poetry Award and moved east. She briefly taught at Hot Springs High School in Arkansas before moving to New York City in 1997.

Bashir worked as an editor and writer for various publications such as Ms. Magazine, Black Issues Book Review, and Curve. During that period, Bashir published poetry, articles, essays and editorials in publications such as Poetry, Callaloo, Essence Magazine, the San Francisco Bay Guardian, Vibe, Seventeen, XXL, the American Journal of Public Health, and The Encyclopedia Project.

In 1999, she published her first chapbook, Wearing Shorts on the First Day of Spring. Her second chapbook American Visa was published in 2001. In 2002 Bashir became a founding organizer of Fire & Ink, a writers festival for LGBT writers of African descent. In addition, Bashir is an alumni fellow of Cave Canem, and has served on numerous boards of directors including the National Black Justice Coalition and NY Black Pride.

Bashir co-edited Role Call: A Generational Anthology of Social and Political Black Art & Literature (2002) with Tony Medina and Quraysh Ali Lansana. She wrote "June Jordan: A critical biography" which was included in Greenwood Press' Contemporary American Women Poets: An A-to-Z Guide (2003).

She published her debut poetry collection, Where the Apple Falls, in 2005. This collection focused on womanhood, and the intersection of femininity, sexuality, seasons and the cycle of life and death. In 2006, she published her third chapbook, Teasing Crow & Other Haiku.

Bashir's second full-length poetry collection Gospel was published in 2009. The sequence of Gospel was based on Ghanaian call and response sequences in music, and the poems were inspired by Norse mythology and traditional gospel music. Both Where the Apple Falls and Gospel were nominated for Lambda Literary Awards.

From 2011 to 2012, Bashir was a lecturer at the University of Michigan. In 2012, she began teaching Creative Writing at Reed College in Portland, Oregon, where she is associate professor of Creative Writing. For the month of June 2019, Bashir was Poem-a-Day Guest Editor for the Academy of American Poets. Bashir served as the executive director of Lambda Literary, an LGBTQ writers organization, from September 2022 to November 2023.

== Field Theories ==
Bashir's third poetry collection, Field Theories, was published by Nightboat Books in 2017. The collection works around a central sequence of "coronagraphs" which form a crown of sonnets on the legend of John Henry and his wife Polly Ann. The collection interweaves intersectionality and other sociological theory with physics, most notably black body theory and the laws of thermodynamics. Kirsten Ihns described its themes in a review for Chicago Review wrote that:

In Samiya Bashir's Field Theories (Nightboat, 2017), the theories, and the fields they reach for, include not only the magnetic, gravitational, and electrical fields one might expect, but also America's troubled racial history thought as a field, fields of influence, fields of human relation. Bashir thinks all these terms through each other and, by recasting lived experience in the terms of physics and physics in the form of the material details of human life, opens new ways of thinking about each.

== Influences ==
Travel and community building are central influences on Bashir's work, and she travelled to Ghana for research in 2013. Bashir has published and written on topics such as social justice, the body, femininity, public health and the African diaspora. Much of her work is in the genre of poetry and memoir.

== Awards and recognition ==
Bashir has been an artist-in-residence at the Virginia Center for the Creative Arts, Soul Mountain Retreat, Alma de Mujer Center for Social Change, and The Austin Project. Bashir was also James Cody Scholar for the James Dick Foundation for the Arts.

While at Berkeley, Bashir served as poet laureate of the University of California. She received the Lesbian Poetry Award from the Astraea Lesbian Foundation for Justice in 2002. Bashir's poetry collection Where the Apple Falls was nominated for the Lambda Literary Award for Lesbian Poetry in 2005. Bashir was nominated for the same award at the 22nd Lambda Literary Awards in 2010 for Gospel: Poems. Gospel was also nominated for a Hurston/Wright Legacy Award.

In 2011, Bashir won the Hopwood Poetry Award and the Helen S. and John Wagner Prize from the Hopwood Awards program. She was a recipient of the 2011 Aquarius Press Legacy Award, given annually in recognition of women writers of color who actively provide creative opportunities for other writers. Bashir's long-form poem "Coronagraphy" was nominated for a Pushcart Prize in 2013. In October 2017 the Regional Arts & Culture Council awarded Bashir an Individual Artist Fellowship in Literature in recognition of her achievements.

Field Theories won a Stafford/Hall Oregon Book Award in 2018, and the titular poem of the collection received a Pushcart Prize in 2019. Bashir was awarded the Rome Prize by the American Academy in Rome in 2019 for her multimedia exhibition MAPS: a cartography in progress. Bashir was the first black woman to be awarded the fellowship in literature, and was in residence in Rome from 2019 to 2020.

== Selected bibliography ==
=== Collections ===
- Field Theories. New York: Nightboat Books. 2017.
- Gospel: Poems. Washington, D.C.: RedBone Press. 2009.
- Where the Apple Falls: Poems. Washington, D.C.: RedBone Press. 2005.

=== Chapbooks ===
- Teasing Crow & Other Haiku. 2006.
- Evans, Mari (2001). American Visa. New York: SistaFire Publishing.
- Wearing Shorts on the First Day of Spring. 1999.

=== Selected anthologies ===
- Pushcart Prize XLIII: Best of the Small Presses. Wainscott, New York: Pushcart Press. 2019.
- Nepantla: an anthology for queer poets of color. New York: Nightboat Books. 2018.
- Ghost Fishing: An Eco-Justice Poetry Anthology. Athens, Georgia: University of Georgia Press. 2018.
- Bettering American Poetry 2015. Bettering Books. 2017.
- Flicker and Spark: A Contemporary Queer Anthology. Lowbrow Press. 2013.
- War Diaries. Los Angeles: AIDS Project Los Angeles. 2010.
- Voices Rising: celebrating 20 years of Black lesbian, gay, bisexual & transgender writing. Washington, D.C.: RedBone Press. 2007.
- Cave Canem Tenth Anniversary Anthology. Cave Canem. 2006.
- Best Lesbian Erotica 03. San Francisco: Cleis Press. 2006.
- (as editor) Best Black Women's Erotica 2, 1st ed. San Francisco: Cleis Press. 2003.
- Best of the Best Lesbian Erotica. San Francisco: Cleis Press. 2000.
- (as editor) Medina, Tony; Lansana, Quraysh Ali (2002). Role Call: A Generational Anthology of Social and Political Black Art & Literature. Chicago: Third World Press.

== Selected exhibitions ==
Bashir has participated in numerous exhibitions, workshops and multimedia works. Bashir's I Hope This Helps was part of the American Academy in Rome's annual Cinque Mostre exhibit in February 2020. She collaborated on the "Twenty Seventh Night: A Chamber Opera in 8 minutes" with Michael-Thomas Foumai, which premiered at the University of Michigan Museum of Art.

In 2023, her Opera, “Cook Shack” with composer Del’Shawn Taylor was selected for the inaugural New Works Collective with the Opera Theatre of St. Louis.

Bashir produced the multimedia poetry exhibition Coronagraphy with Tracy Schlapp and Breach (aka Silt, Soot, and Smut) with sculptor Alison Saar, which were exhibited together as Hades D.W.P. in 2015. Her work was included in the exhibition 15 m = ? at the 2017 Time-Based Art Festival in Portland.

In February 2019, Bashir presented The Lushness of Print, an exhibition of collaborative poetry broadsides with Letra Chueca Press. The multimedia exhibition MAPS: a cartography in progress was exhibited at the Hoffman Art Gallery and California Institute of the Arts. The exhibit explored the East African Diaspora through culture and movement.

Bashir created a series of six video poems based on Field Theories with artist Roland Dahwen Wu and choreographer Keyon Gaskin.

She collaborated with composer Julian Wachner on the choral-orchestral work Here's The Thing, originally planned to debut in fall 2020. The work was commissioned to celebrate the appointment of Artistic Director Eugene Rogers for The Washington Chorus.
