= Bitsui =

Bitsui is a surname of Navajo origin. People known by the name include:

- Jeremiah Bitsui (born 1979/1980), American actor
- Sherwin Bitsui (born 1975), American poet
