= Bianca Spriggs =

American writer

- Born: 1981 (age 44–45); Milwaukee, Wisconsin, U.S.
- Occupations: Poet, multidisciplinary artist, professor
- Notable work: Kaffir Lily, How Swallowtails Become Dragons, Circe's Lament: Wild Women Poetry, Call Her By Her Name, The Galaxy is a Dance Floor, Black Bone: 25 Years of the Affrilachian Poets

Bianca Lynne Spriggs (born 1981) is an American poet and multidisciplinary artist born in Milwaukee, WI. While widely considered a born-and-bred Kentuckian, she actually moved around a lot due to the nature of her parents' work. For several years of her childhood, she would bounce around from Florida, Indiana, and Milwaukee. She moved to Kentucky when she was eleven years old and lived there the longest. She currently resides in Athens, OH where she is an Assistant Professor of English at Ohio University. As a second generation Affrilachian Poet, she is the author of Kaffir Lily (Wind Publications, 2010), How Swallowtails Become Dragons (Accents Publishing, 2011), The Galaxy is a Dance Floor (Argos Books, 2016), and Call Her By Her Name (Northwestern University Press, 2016). She is the editor of The Swallowtale Project: Creative Writing for Incarcerated Women (2012), and co-editor of the anthologies, Circe's Lament: An Anthology of Wild Women (Accent's Publishing, 2015), Undead: A Poetry Anthology of Ghouls, Ghosts, and More (Apex Publications, 2017), and Black Bone: 25 Years of the Affrilachian Poets(University of Kentucky Press, 2018).

Spriggs's work is considered primarily speculative in nature drawing upon mythology, folklore, surrealism, and science fiction for inspiration. She often focuses on the connections between art and community and the identity of Black women in the American South. From 2006 to 2012, she was the creator and artistic director of the annual Wild Women of Poetry Slam at the Kentucky Women Writers Conference. In 2013, her poem "The ________ of the Universe: A Love Story" was tattooed onto 248 residents of Lexington as part of the Lexington Tattoo Project. Also in 2013, at Transylvania University's Morlan Gallery, she collaborated with videographer Angel Clark to curate the multimedia exhibit The Thirteen, which memorialized 13 black women who were lynched or killed in Kentucky. She was featured on the track "Hypnopomp (Epilogue)" in CunninLynguists' 2011 album Oneirology. In 2019, her poem "To the woman I saw today who wept in her car" was one of the most frequently viewed poems on a list of social justice-related poems maintained by Split This Rock. Her poems can also be found in anthologies and journals such as Union Station Magazine, Tidal Basin Review, New Growth: Recent Kentucky Writings, America!, and the Appalachian Heritage Magazine.

For Spriggs poetry is much like a laboratory, in the sense that she feels much like a "mad scientist" attempting to invent something unbeknown to her. Her passion for poetry sprouted from the visual arts, once she found solace in writing poems and stories. She attributes this passion for visual arts as the root for her poetry, mentioning that it "felt like an extension of my visual aesthetic." Furthermore, Spriggs sees poetry as a form that exposes our animal nature. She mentions how while her poems are for her intended audience, her poems help her save her own life as well. They are an outlet for her. "that dream-world, that place of reverie, or subconscious, I’m constantly investigating that, because whatever drives and motivates me is going to somehow manifest into my conscious decisions. So poetry is a way for me to investigate those decisions. And be very proactive about it in that sense. Poetry as a career was a concept not always present in her mind, as it wasn't until late in her career that she actually started to seriously think of writing as a career. It was only after over ten years of writing, being inducted into the Affrilachian Poets, and graduating from the Cave Canem retreat that she started to think of writing and poetry as a serious career. At the time, she was unhappy with her day job as it was affecting other facets of her life. She states “With the complete support and backing of my husband, I decided to take the plunge into full-on writer mode.” She applied for the Kentucky Foundation of Women grant, and after being granted the full amount she quit her day job and began to re-orient herself to the notion of writing as a career. Her writing evolved into a career once she applied to be a writer for the Kentucky Foundation for Women and decided to pursue this practice as a full-time job. Her inspiration comes from her love for storytelling: "Sometimes writing is telling my own story through (other people), and sometimes, it’s telling their stories through my own." She was also influenced heavily by Jude McPherson and Eric Sutherland in her early career, as they were instrumental in encouraging her to grow her voice both reading in public and putting together her first chapbooks Maya Angelou was also an inspiration for Spriggs, as she once had the opportunity to see her speak at the Singletary Center. While she cannot recall what Angelou specifically spoke about, she vividly remembered Angelou saying that poetry needed people to continue to read and write. Spriggs mentions how she felt Angelou was talking directly to her, and would go home and compose her first official "poem" –-"Revival Room", which was about the tradition of some of the womenfolk in her family turning a room upstairs during potlucks or family reunions into a mini-revival. Spriggs's induction into the Affrilachian Poets in 2004 was one she was immensely proud of, as she is a second-generation member. She mentioned how before her induction "I had never really seen anyone Black addressing a large crowd other than a minister, a politician, or an entertainer. I didn’t even know Black people did stuff like read poetry in public." Her induction went a long way in setting the stage for future African American poets.

== Education ==
Spriggs graduated from Transylvania University in 2003 with a degree in history and a minor in studio art. She received her M.A. in English from the University of Wisconsin-Milwaukee in 2005 and in 2017, she received her Ph.D. in English literature at the University of Kentucky.

== Awards ==
Spriggs is a 2013 recipient of an Al Smith Individual Artist Fellowship in Poetry, a Pushcart Prize nominee, and a recipient of five Artist Enrichment Grants from the Kentucky Foundation for Women, including an Arts Meets Activism grant. She was also named one of the Top 30 Black Performance Poets in the U.S. by TheRoot.com. She was the recipient of the 2016 Sallie Bingham Award for feminist expression in the arts. She was also a Cave Canem Fellow in 2006, 2007, and 2010.

== Works ==
- Kaffir Lily (2010)
- How Swallowtails Became Dragons (2011)
- Call Her By Her Name (2016)
- The Galaxy Is a Dance Floor (2016)

Co-editor

- Circe’s Lament: An Anthology of Wild Women (2016)
- Undead: Ghouls, Ghosts, and More (2017)
- Black Bone: 25 Years of the Affrilachian Poets (2018)
