= M. Ayodele Heath =

American poet

- Born: Atlanta, GA
- Occupation: poet
- Known for: poetry

M. Ayodele Heath is an American poet, spoken-word performer, and fiction writer.

== Life ==
Born in Atlanta, M. Ayodele Heath studied electrical engineering at the Georgia Institute of Technology and holds an MFA in Poetry from New England College. He was a two-time Southeastern Regional Poetry Slam Individual Champion (1999, 2000) and a top-10 individual finisher at the National Poetry Slam (1999). His first book of poems, Otherness, was published in 2011 on Brick Road Poetry Press. He is creator of the collaborative poetry form, electronic corpse, and editor of the anthology, Electronic Corpse: Poems from a Digital Salon (Svaha Paradox, 2014).

== Awards ==
- 1999, 2000 Southeastern Regional Poetry Slam Individual Champion
- 2001 Emerging Artist grant from the Atlanta Bureau for Cultural Affairs
- 2002, 2003 Fellowship, Summer Poetry at Idyllwild
- 2005 Fellowship, Caversham Center for Writers & Artists, South Africa
- 2007 McEver Visiting Chair in Writing at the Georgia Institute of Technology
- 2009 Dorothy Sargent Rosenberg Poetry Prize
- 2010 Fellowship, Cave Canem Foundation
- 2011 RHINO Editors' Prize

== Bibliography ==
- Electronic Corpse: Poems from a Digital Salon, poems (Svaha Paradox (2014)).
- Otherness, poems (Brick Road Poetry Press, 2011).
- Heath's poetry has appeared in the anthologies Poetry Slam: the Competitive Art of Performance Poetry (Manic D Press, 2000), My South: a People, a Place, a World All Its Own (Rutledge Hill Press, 2005), and The Southern Poetry Anthology, Volume V (Texas Review Press, 2012).
- Heath's poetry has appeared in numerous journals including Callaloo, Chattahoochee Review, Crab Orchard Review, diode Poetry Journal, Eclectic Literary Forum, Mississippi Review, Mythium, New Millennium Writings, New York Quarterly, Open City, and storySouth

== Film/Video ==
- 3-Minute Activists: the Soul of Slam (Mad Mouth Media, Cogitate Productions), feature-length film (2014).
- 28 Days of Poetry: Poets Make Black History (Week 1), web video series (2011).
- 28 Days of Poetry: Poets Make Black History (Week 2), web video series (2011).
- 28 Days of Poetry: Poets Make Black History (Week 3), web video series (2011).
- 28 Days of Poetry: Poets Make Black History (Week 4), web video series (2011).
