= Firethorn (novel) =

2004 novel by Sarah Micklem

- First edition cover
- Author: Sarah Micklem
- Language: English
- Series: Firethorn Trilogy
- Genre: Fantasy novel
- Publisher: Scribner
- Publication date: May 25, 2004
- Publication place: United States
- Pages: 400 pp (first edition, hardback)
- ISBN: 0-7432-4794-9 (first edition, hardback)
- OCLC: 53356519
- Dewey Decimal: 813/.6 22
- LC Class: PS3613.I356 F57 2004
- Followed by: Wildfire

Firethorn is a 2004 fantasy novel by American writer Sarah Micklem.

== Plot introduction ==
Firethorn, narrated by the protagonist of the same name, starts out as Luck, a 'mudfolk' orphan with unusually red hair serving an ageing noblewoman, the Dame, in a land where the division between high and lowborn is literally attributed to the gods. Too restless to live her fate as a drudge and too proud to accept the inevitable abuse that accompanies it after the Dame's death, Luck runs. A year in the mountains spent starving to death makes her desperate enough to eat the poisonous berries of the firethorn tree but instead of dying, she has a revelation that may well include a god-granted gift.

Emerging from the forest, calling herself Firethorn, she tries to return to civilisation, knowing she can never quite fit. In the Upside-Down Days (ten days when the high and lowborn trade places) she meets Sire Galan, a visiting lord who takes her as his lover. When he marches off to war and suggests she tag along as his 'sheath' (a woman that follows a soldier to war and shares his bed), she jumps at the chance just to get away. But life as a camp follower waiting for war may well be something that not even Firethorn can survive...

== Plot summary ==
A mysterious foundling with unique red hair and strange god-given powers, Firethorn is condemned to life as a powerless servant—or so she believes, until one of King Thyrse's noblemen becomes her lover. But, as she accompanies Sire Galan to war, Firethorn discovers she may have traded one form of bondage for another. A soldier's mistress—even a high-born soldier's mistress—is despised as a "sheath," or camp follower. Also, Firethorn's nasty ex-overlord, Sire Pava, has joined the king's army, and she has made a new enemy in her lover's cousin and closest friend, the sadistic Sire Rodela. However, she and Galan share a fiery love that will surely overcome the opposition of both their personal enemies and their kingdom's enemies. Then Sire Galan makes a strange, heart-shattering wager that may not only ruin his honor, but get them both killed.

== Characters ==
- Firethorn - narrator, protagonist, Sir Galan's lover, the Dame's apprentice
- Sire Galan - Firethorn's lover, King Thyrse's nobleman, a Cataphract of the Clan of Crux, Sir Pava's relative
- The Dame - Firethorn's caretaker and teacher
- Sire Rodela - Sire Galan's armiger
- Sire Pava - Sire Galan's relative
- Consort Vulpeja - Sire Galan's "wager"
- Divine Xyster - Head of Sire Galan's clan
- First of Crux - Clan of Crux head
- Ardor Wildfire - God

== Release details ==
- 2004, USA, Scribner ISBN 0-7432-4794-9, Pub date 25 May 2004, hardcover (First edition)
- 2005, UK, Voyager ISBN 0-00-720396-9, Pub date 4 April 2005, hardcover
- 2005, UK, Voyager ISBN 0-00-719305-X, Pub date ? March 2005, paperback
- 2005, USA, Spectra Books ISBN 0-553-38340-X, Pub date 28 June 2005, paperback
- 2006, UK, Voyager ISBN 0-00-719306-8, Pub date 4 April 2006, paperback (Mass market edition
