= Achilles and Briseis =

Ancient Roman painting

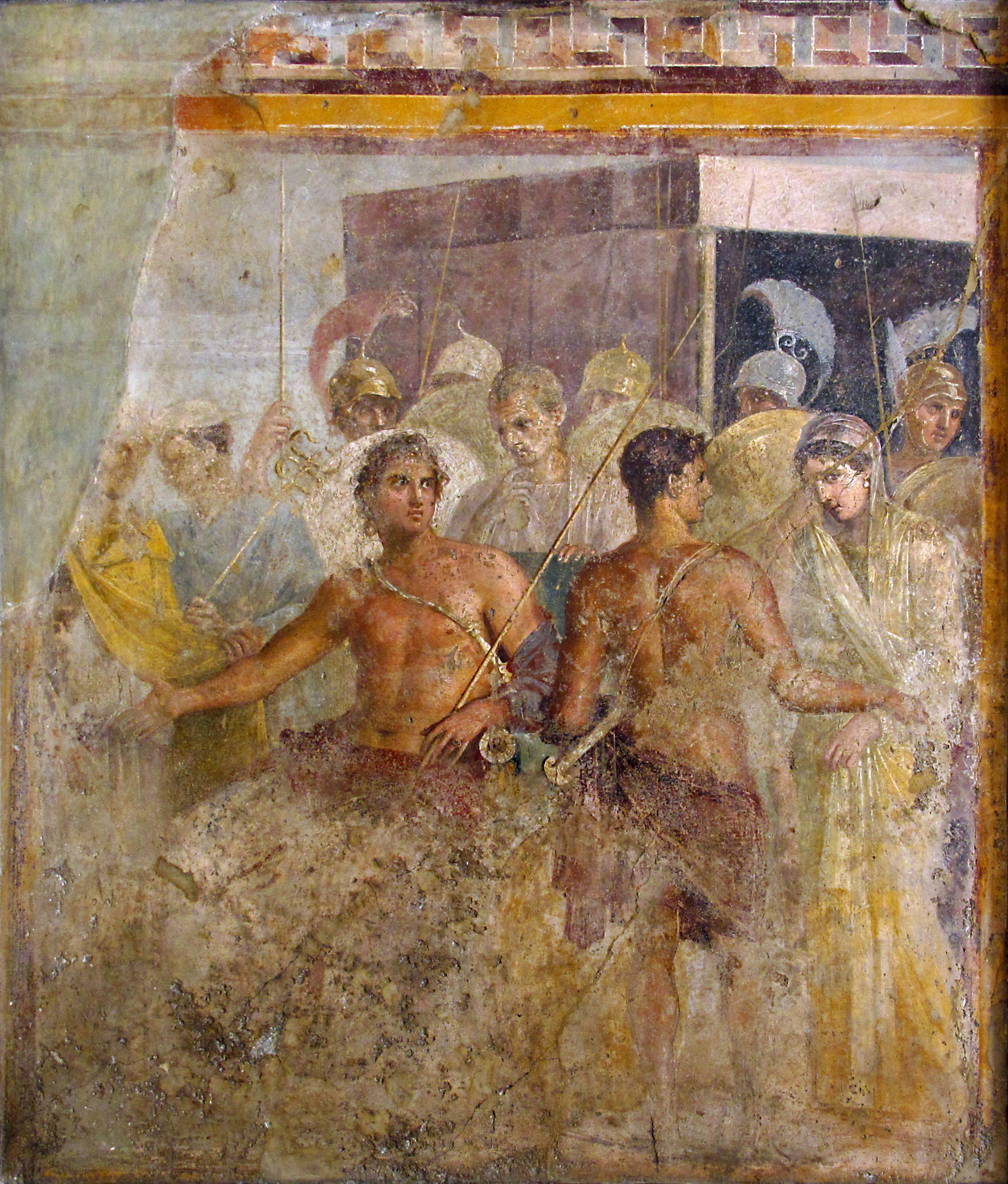
Briseis taken away from Achilles, Fourth Style of Pompeian wall painting, from the atrium of the House of the Tragic Poet

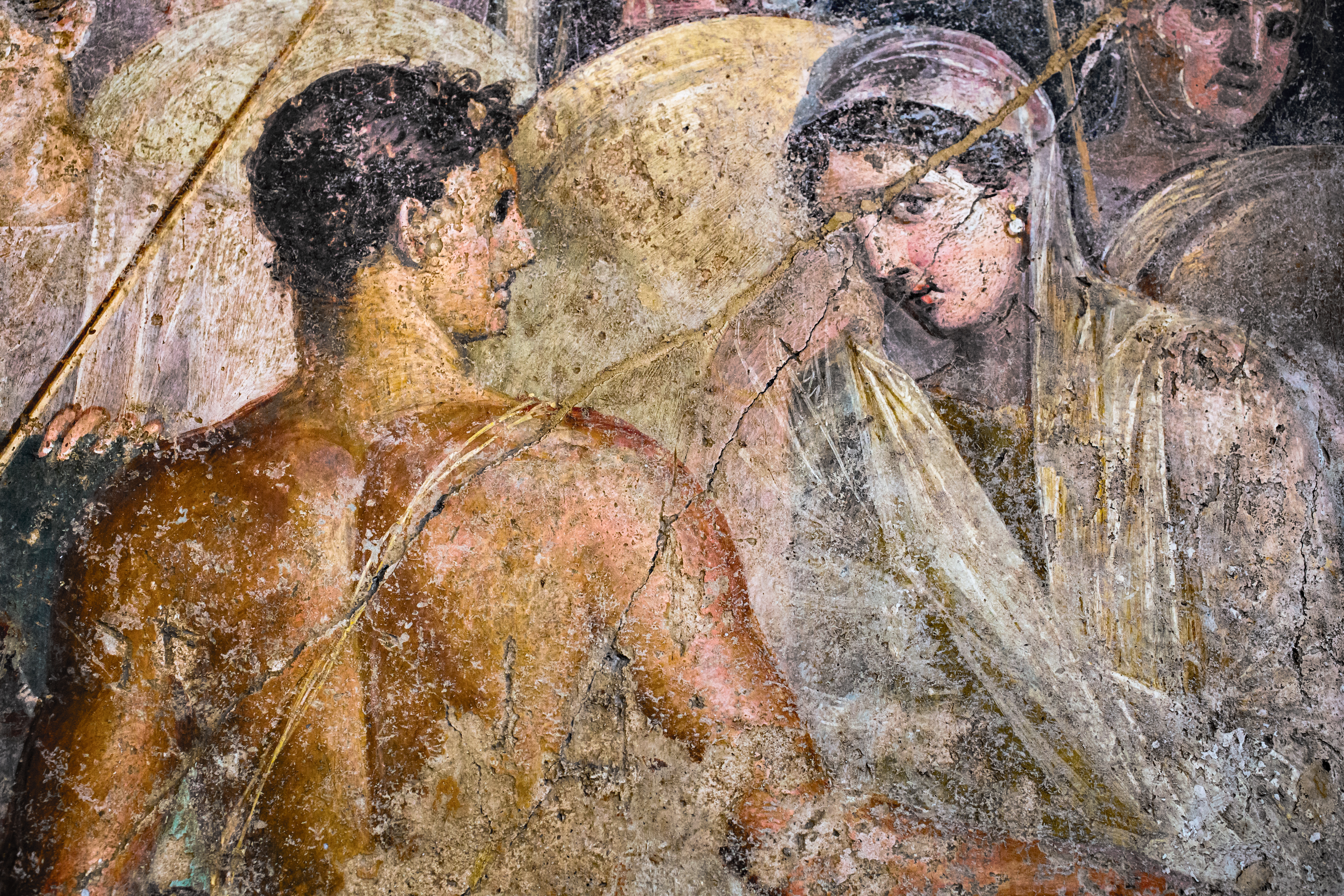
Detail

Achilles and Briseis is an ancient Roman painting from the 1st-century AD, depicting the scene from the Iliad where the captured Trojan princess and priestess Briseis is taken away from Achilles by the order of Agamemnon. It was found in the House of the Tragic Poet in Pompeii, Italy. The image is painted in distemper, similar to coloured white-washing and intermediary between fresco and paint. It was moved to the Naples National Archaeological Museum, where it remains.

Agostino Carracci produced an engraving from it, which was included in his collection of erotic poses, I Modi.
