= Hoffman Art Gallery =

Art gallery in Portland, Oregon, U.S.

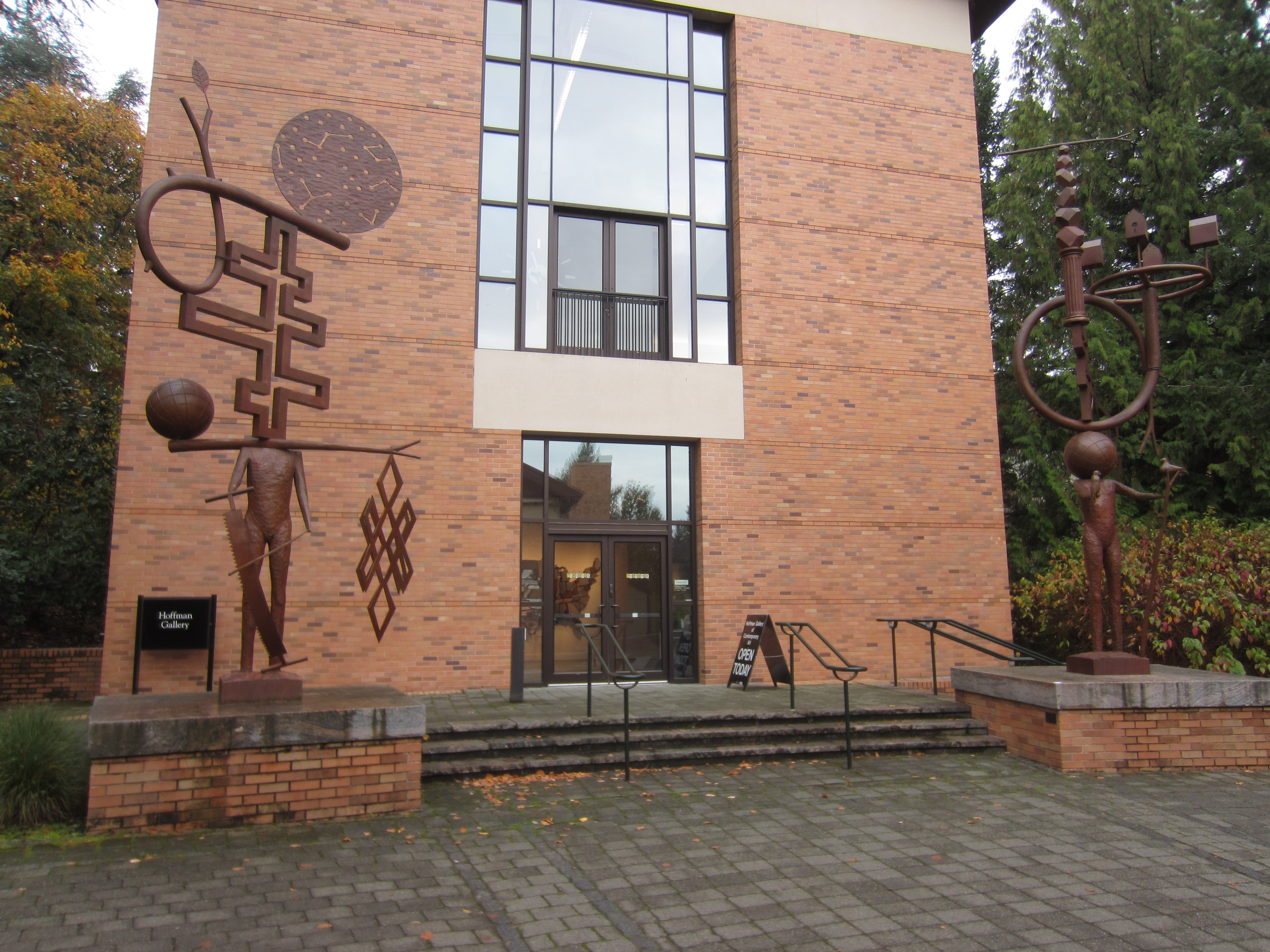
- The building's exterior in 2017

- Location within Portland, Oregon

General information
- Location: Portland, Oregon, United States
- Coordinates: 45.45052°N 122.66894°W

The Ronna and Eric Hoffman Gallery of Contemporary Art, or simply Hoffman Art Gallery, is an art gallery and building on the Lewis & Clark College campus, in Portland, Oregon. The gallery opened in 1997.
