= Sarah Micklem =

American novelist

- Born: Virginia
- Education: Princeton University
- Occupations: Novelist, graphic designer
- Spouse: Cornelius Eady
- Writing career
- Genre: Fantasy
- Website: firethorn.info

Sarah Micklem is the author of the best-selling fantasy novel, Firethorn. She began writing after many years as a graphic designer and spent fourteen years working for Time Warner, designing for a children's magazine in New York City. She wrote Firethorn while working as the art director for the magazine, with the second part of the trilogy titled Wildfire. She is the second daughter of three children, of a schoolteacher father and an activist mother. She received her high school G.E.D and graduated from Princeton University. She lives with her husband, poet and playwright Cornelius Eady, in New York City and Indiana, where she teaches fiction at the University of Notre Dame.

== Bibliography ==
- Firethorn (2004)
- Wildfire (2009)
