= Lyrae van Clief-Stefanon =

American poet

Lyrae Van Clief-Stefanon
- Born: United States
- Education: Washington and Lee University; Penn State University
- Occupation: Poet
- Writing career
- Genre: Poetry

Lyrae Van Clief-Stefanon (born 1971) is an American poet. In 2009, she was a National Book Award finalist for her book, Open Interval.

== Career ==
Van Clief-Stefanon earned her BA in English from Washington and Lee University in 1996, and her MFA in Poetry from Penn State University in 1999. She published her first full-length collection, Black Swan (University of Pittsburgh Press), in 2001, for which she won the Cave Canem Prize and was a finalist for the 2003 Patterson Poetry Prize.

In July 2004, she became an assistant professor at Cornell University in English Literature.

In June 2008, Van Clief-Stefanon co-authored the chapbook Poems in Conversation and a Conversation with Elizabeth Alexander. In April 2009, Van Clief-Stefanon published her second poetry collection, ]Open Interval[, which was a finalist for the National Book Award.

Van Clief-Stefanon's work has appeared in African American Review, Callaloo, Crab Orchard Review, Gulf Coast, and Shenandoah, among other places.

She is currently working on a third book, The Coal Tar Colors.
