= House of the Tragic Poet =

Ancient house in Pompeii, Italy

Coordinates: 40°45′03″N 14°29′02″E

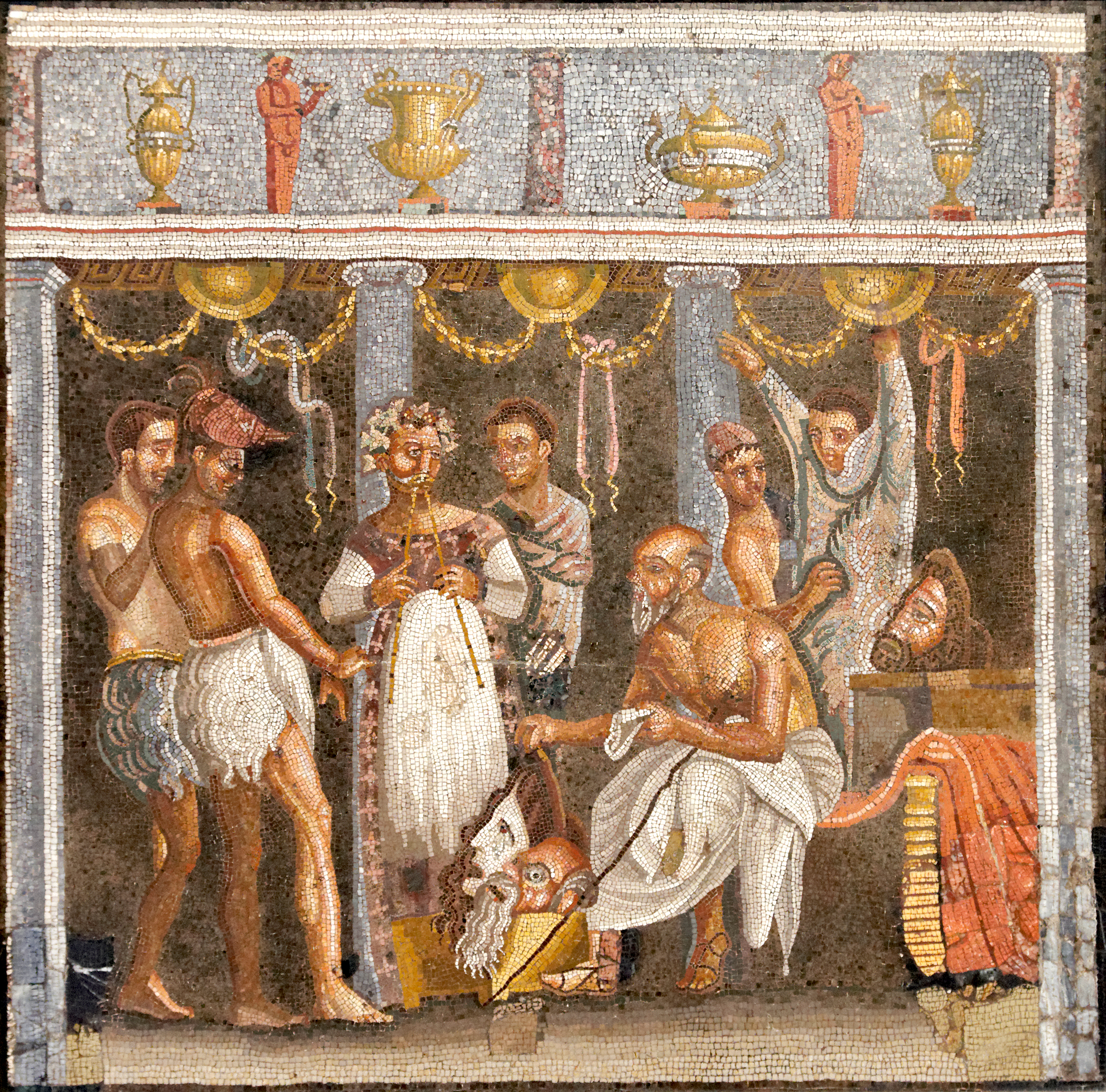
Mosaic depicting a cast of tragic actors

Pompeii map

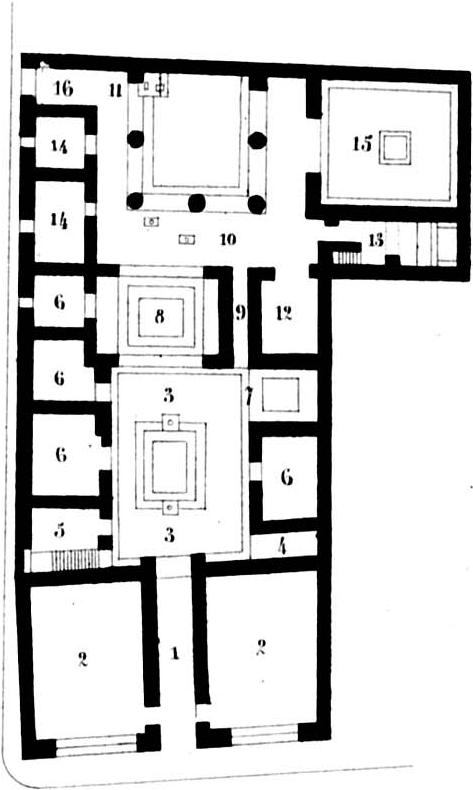
Plan

The House of the Tragic Poet (also called The Homeric House or The Iliadic House) is a Roman house in Pompeii, Italy dating to the 2nd century BCE. The house is famous for its elaborate mosaic floors and frescoes depicting scenes from Greek mythology.

Discovered in November 1824 by the archaeologist Antonio Bonucci, the House of the Tragic Poet has interested scholars and writers for generations. Although the size of the house itself is modest, its interior decorations are not only numerous but of the highest quality among other frescoes and mosaics from ancient Pompeii, preserved by the eruption of Mount Vesuvius in 79 AD.

Traditionally, Pompeii is geographically broken up into nine regional areas, which are then further broken up into insular areas. The House of the Tragic Poet sat in Regio VI, Insula 8, the far-western part of Pompeii. The house faced the Via di Nola, one of Pompeii's largest streets that linked the forum and the Street of the Tombs. Across the Via di Nola from the House of the Tragic Poet sat the Forum Baths of Pompeii.

== Layout ==
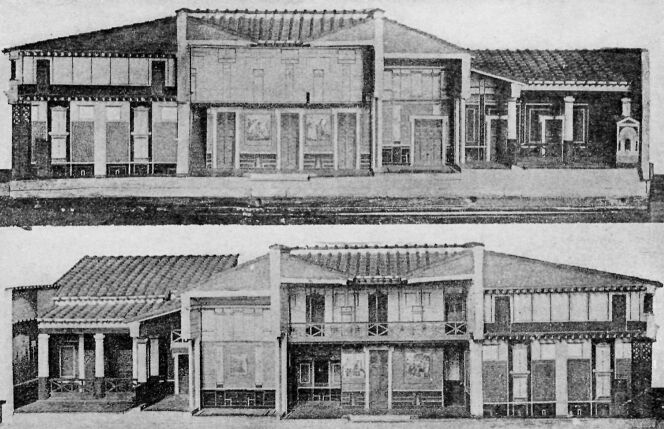
Recreated model of the House of the Tragic Poet

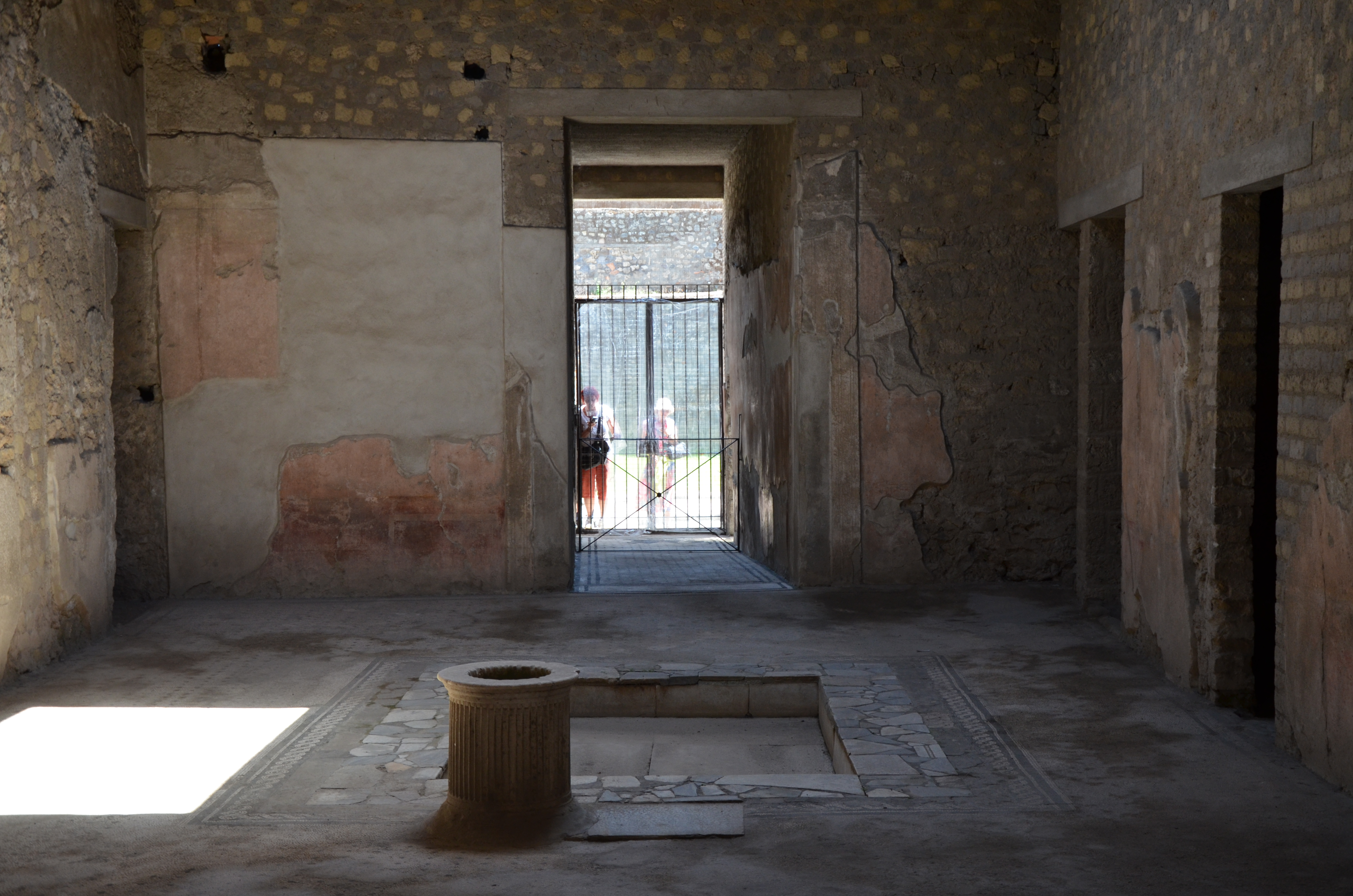
Atrium

Like many Roman homes of the period, the House of the Tragic Poet is divided into two primary sections. The front, south-facing portion of the house serves as a public, presentation-oriented space. Here, two large rooms with outward-opening walls serve as shops run by the homeowners, or, less likely, as servants quarters. These shops lie on either side of a narrow vestibule. At the end of this hall sits the atrium, the most decorated of the rooms within the House of the Tragic Poet. Here, a large rectangular impluvium, or sunken water basin sits beneath an open ceiling, collecting water to be used by members of the household. Near the northern end of the impluvium sits a wellhead to be used for drawing water from the basin. Still farther from the entrance sits the tablinum, a second, open common area.

From these main areas extend smaller, private rooms, marking the second section of the house. Along the western wall of the atrium lie a series of cubicula, or bedrooms. Opposite these lie an additional cubiculum, an ala (a service area for a dining room), and an oecus (a small dining area). The northern end of the tablinum opens onto a large, open peristyle, or garden courtyard. To the right of the peristyle sits the drawing room, which is believed to have been used as the main dining salon. Adjacent to the drawing room is a small kitchen area. Near the left side of the peristyle, a small back door opens onto an additional street. Finally, into north-western corner of the peristyle is built a small lararium, or shrine to be used in worshipping the Lares Familiares, or family gods. This shrine contained a marble statuette depicting a satyr carrying fruit.

Although records and archaeological experts have confidently confirmed the existence of an upper story in the House of the Tragic Poet, little is known about its specific layout.

== Art ==
The house originally contained more than twenty painted and mosaic panels, six of which have been relocated to the National Archaeological Museum in Naples, Italy. These panels were selected for their relation to the Iliad, and were the inspiration behind the names Homeric House and Iliadic House. The painted wall panels within the house are examples of the Fourth Pompeiian style.

=== Vestibule ===
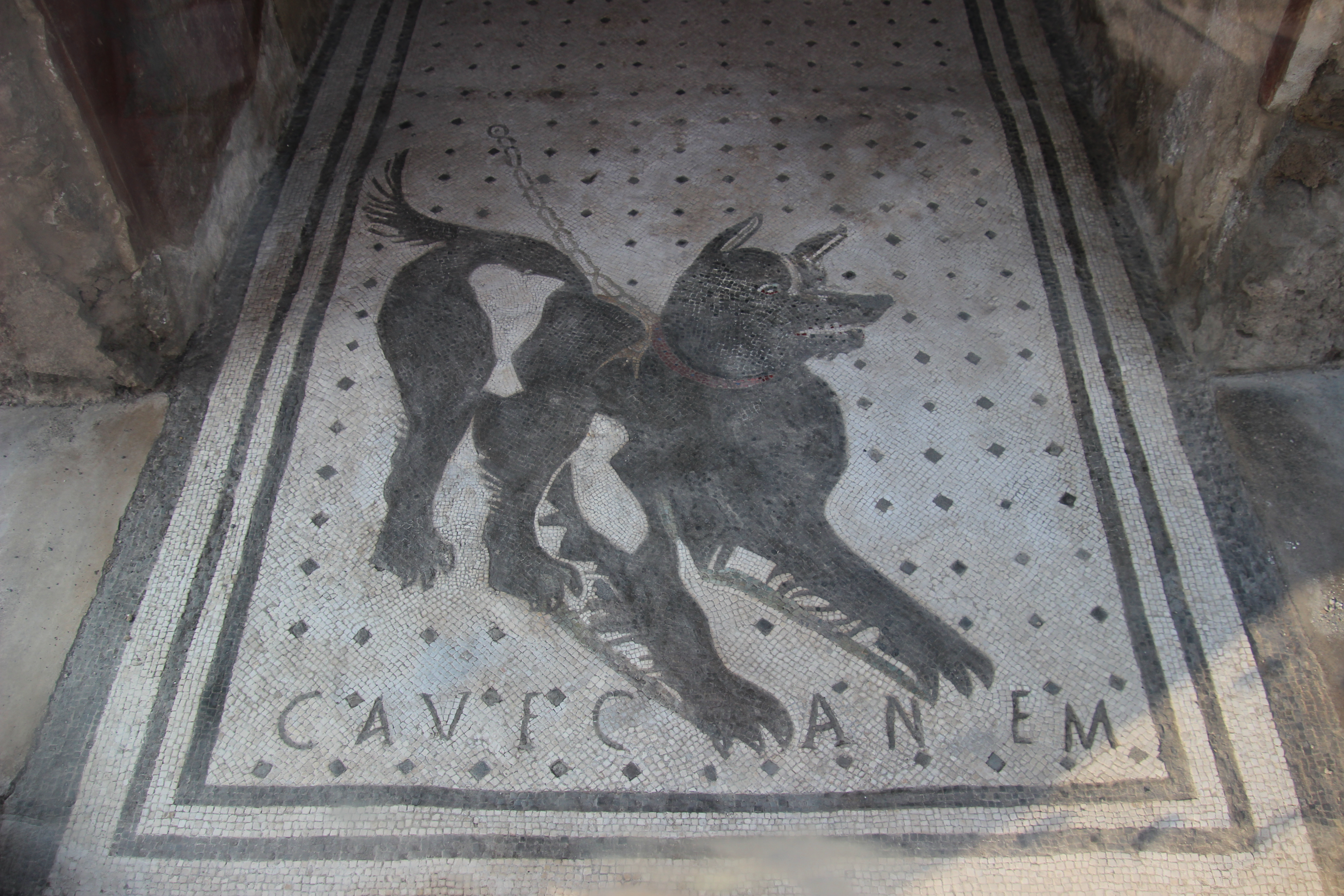
Mosaic Dog from floor of vestibule

The vestibule floor was decorated with a mosaic picture of a domesticated dog leashed and chained to an arbitrary point. Below the figure were the words "CAVE CANEM", meaning Beware of the dog. These words, much like similar signs today, warned visitors to enter at their own risk and served as protection over the more private quarters of the home. The rest of the vestibule floor was decorated in a tesserae or checker-like pattern, in black and white tiles. This pattern was framed by a border of two black stripes that surrounded the room.

=== Atrium ===
The atrium was the focal point of art in the House of the Tragic Poet. Except for the House of the Vettii, it contained more large-scale, mythological frescoes than any other home in Pompeii. Each image was approximately four feet square, making figures slightly smaller than life-size. The images in the atrium frequently feature seated men and women in movement. The women are usually the focus of the images, undergoing important changes in their lives in famous Greek myths.

==== South wall ====
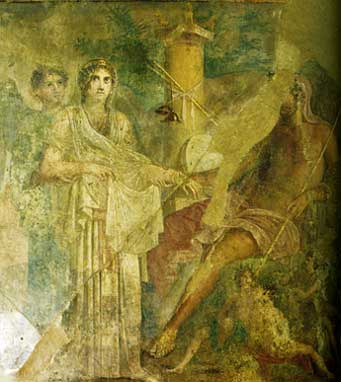
Zeus and Hera on Mount Ida

===== Nuptials of Zeus and Hera =====
This panel depicts the gods Hypnos, Hera, and Zeus on Mt. Ida. Hypnos is presenting Hera to Zeus, who sits seated on the right side of the painting. Zeus is holding Hera by the wrist, and Hera is looking at the viewer reluctantly with her veil removed. The three young figures at the bottom right of the painting are possibly dactyli. In the background, there is a pillar with three lions perched on it. This panel is part of the collection at the Archaeological Museum in Naples, Italy.

===== Aphrodite =====
The image of Aphrodite is now almost entirely destroyed, but what remained of the painting when it was discovered was copied in tempera by the artist Francesco Morelli. The painting may have contained a seated male lover. Because Aphrodite is smaller than the figures in the other paintings, it's also possible the painting contained more figures and depicted the Judgment of Paris.

==== East wall ====
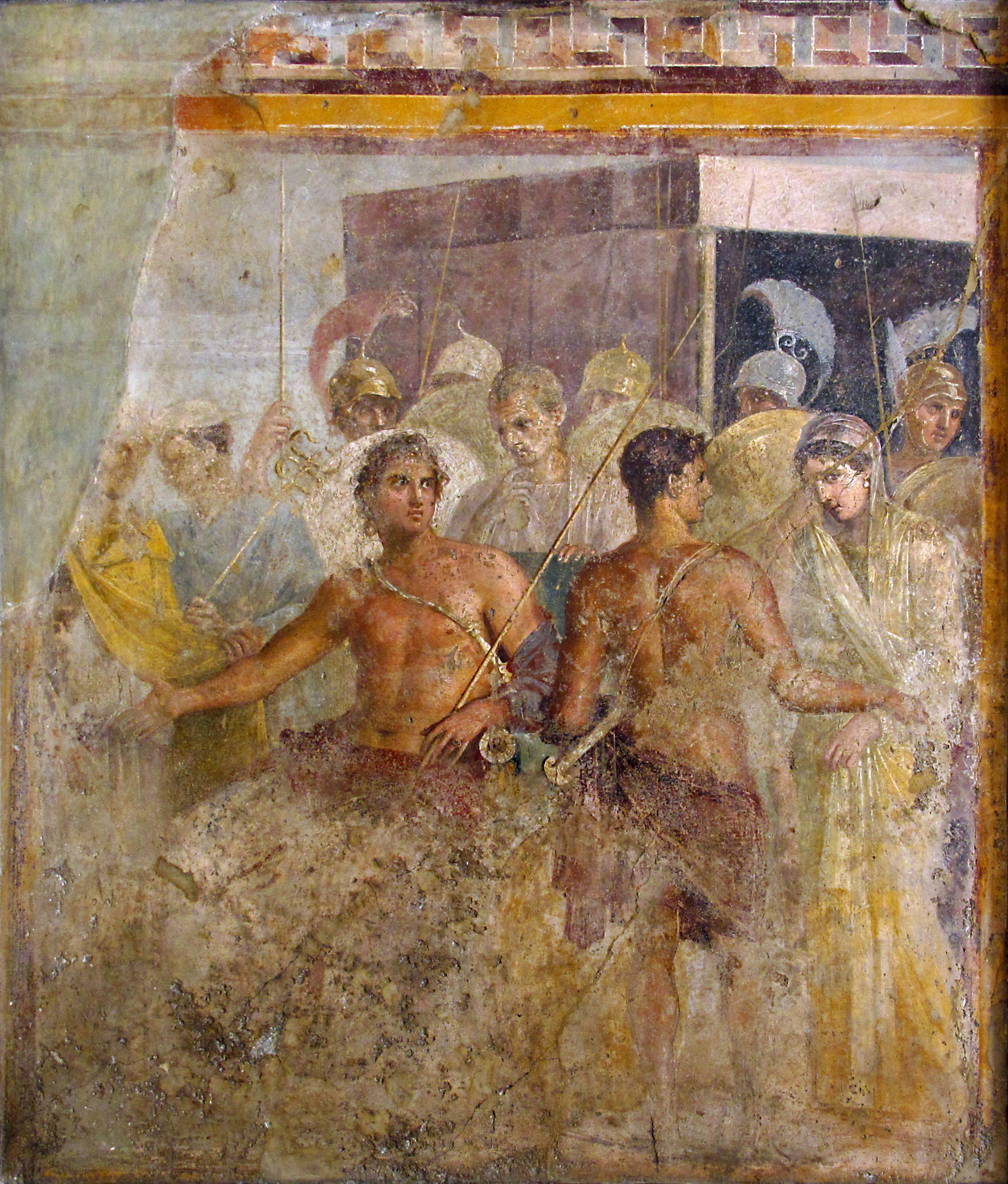
Panel of Achilles surrendering Briseis to Agamemnon

===== Achilles and Briseis =====
This dramatic scene depicts Achilles releasing Briseis to the Greek king Agamemnon. On the right side of the panel, Patroclus leads Briseis by the wrist. Achilles, seated, angrily directs them towards Agamemnon's messenger.

===== Helen and Paris =====
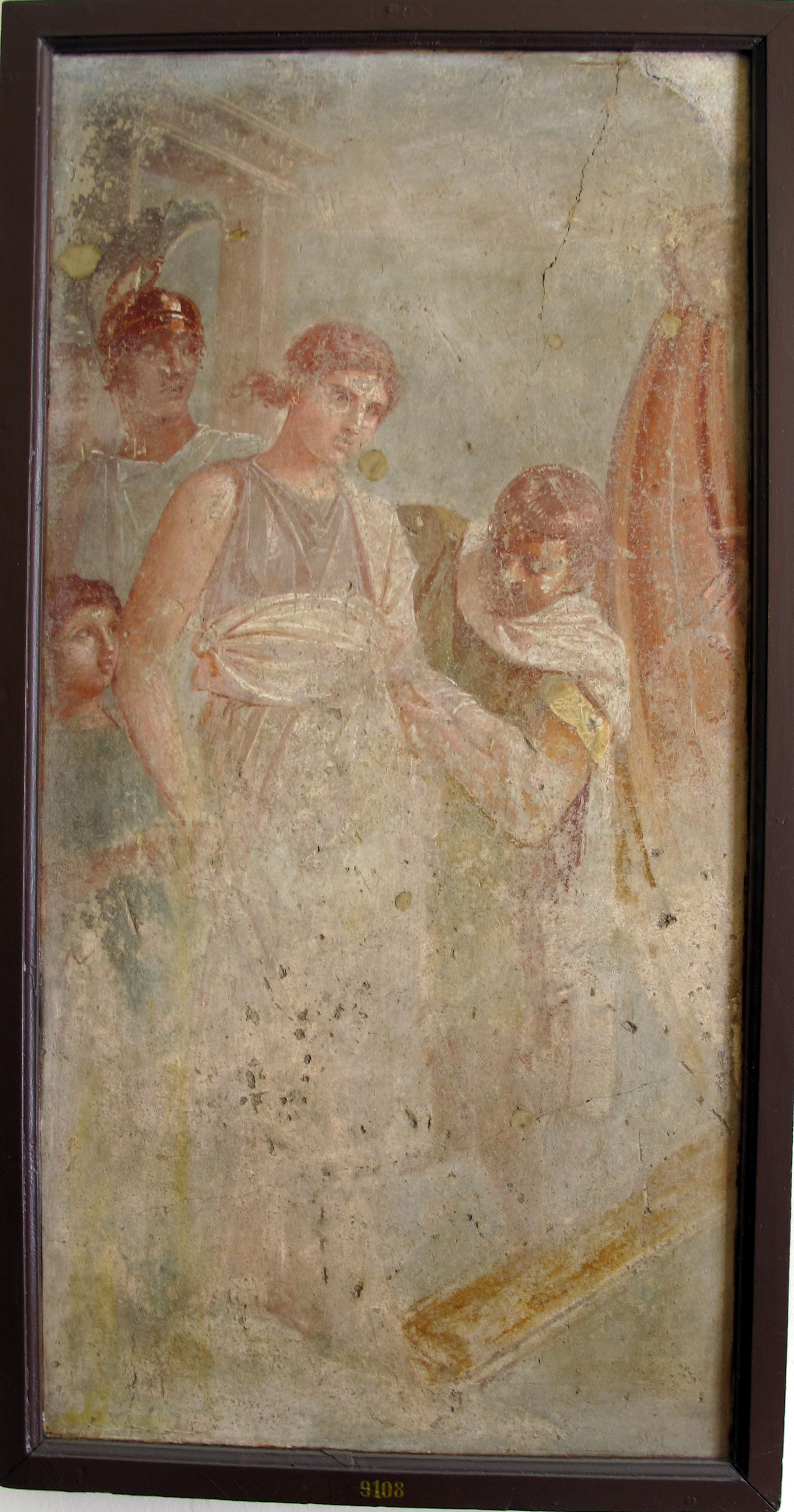
Helen of Sparta boards a ship for Troy

Helen boards ship to travel to Troy. Although no longer in the image, it is believed that Paris was already seated in the boat as Helen boards. Both of these images are part of the collection at the Archaeological Museum in Naples.

==== West wall ====
===== Abduction of Amphitrite =====
Although a large portion of this panel is destroyed, the same composition is seen in a painting from the Villa di Carmiano in Stabiae. The bottom half of the painting was found intact in the House of the Tragic Poet, and depicts Eros as he rides a dolphin and carries a trident. The missing portion, visible in Stabiae, shows that the painting originally depicted Poseidon on his sea horse as he abducted Amphitrite. Like in other panels, she looked out toward the viewer.

===== Wrath of Achilles =====
Almost none of this panel has survived, but the composition, stance of the feet, and red cloth seem to match others which depict the Wrath of Achilles. Only feet and drapery are visible in the surviving portions. The original painting likely depicted Achilles on the right side of the panel as he drew a dagger to attack Agamemnon for taking Briseis, but he is restrained by Athena, who tells him to talk to Agamemnon rather than fight him.

=== Tablinum ===
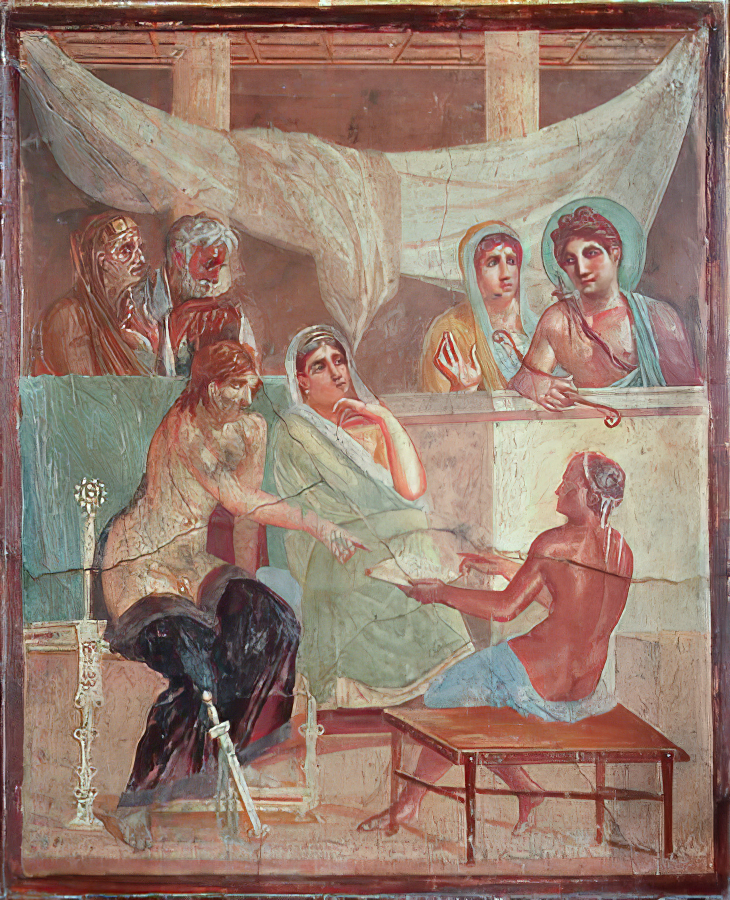
Alcestis and Admetus

The tablinum floor was decorated with an elaborate mosaic image. Here, actors gather backstage preparing for a performance, as one character dresses and another plays a flute. Other characters surround a box of masks to be used during the performance.

On the wall was a panel depicting a scene from the story of Admetus and Alcestis. A messenger reads an oracle to Admetus, seated beside Alcestis, telling him that he will die if someone else does not willingly die in his place. Due to its proximity to the mosaic of the actors, excavators believed this painting depicted a poet reciting his poetry, resulting in the name House of the Tragic Poet. However, the origin of this panel is debatable. Some sources suggest the picture shown here is from the House of the Tragic Poet, and some others argue that it was from Herculaneum instead. Richardson identified this as from the Basilica at Herculaneum. De Carolis identified this with a question mark as “Casa del Poeta Tragico (?)”.

=== Peristyle ===
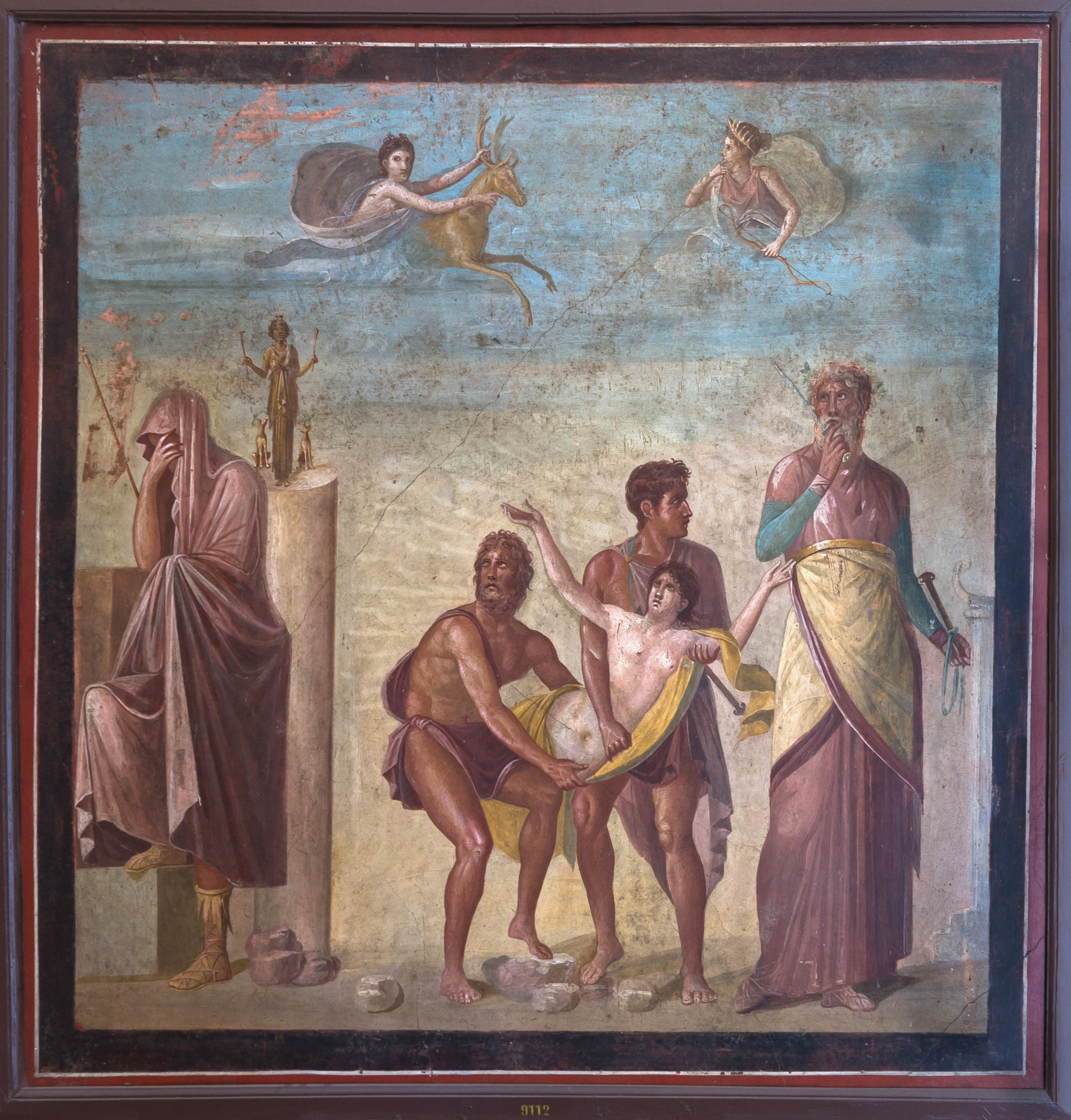
Iphigenia in Aulis Wall painting from north wall, east of peristyle

The semi-outdoor peristyle area featured an imaginary garden scene or paradeisos in the trompe-l'œil style. This image, it is assumed, was intended to blend in with the actual garden that would have grown within the unroofed portion of the peristyle. To the left of the peristyle was a fresco known as the Sacrifice of Iphigenia, in which a nude Iphigenia is taken by Ulysses and Achilles to be sacrificed just before Artemis delivers a deer to be sacrificed in her place. The right side of the painting depicts Calchas the seer holding his hand to his mouth to indicate his divine revelation. Iphigenia's father Agamemnon sits on the left side of the panel facing away from the group with his face covered with a veil, similar to another painting of the scene by the artist Timanthes.

=== Dining room ===
The dining room contained three large panels and several smaller ones. The smaller panels feature depictions of soldiers and depictions of the four seasons as young women. The three larger panels depict cupids and a young couple, a scene featuring Artemis, and a scene of Theseus leaving Ariadne behind as he boards a ship.

== Cultural references ==
The House of the Tragic Poet has served as the focus of many works of fiction and poetry. Among the more famous works is Lord Edward Bulwer Lytton's The Last Days of Pompeii, in which the author invents the personal life of the owner, Glaucus, but accurately describes the house's details. In the Redness of Dawn by author Waldemar Kaden depicts the house as being inhabited by a Christian man named Gaius Sabinus. Another well-known work is Vladimir Janovic's The House of the Tragic Poet, an epic poem based on images from the mosaic and fresco images throughout the villa. The house is also featured in JoJo's Bizarre Adventure: Golden Wind, where the Boss of the gang Passione hides a key near the dog mosaic. The next story features three of the protagonists traveling to Pompeii to retrieve the key.

== Interpretations ==
Art historians and Classics scholars have long been fascinated by the House of the Tragic Poet because of the unique way in which it juxtaposes images from different periods and locations throughout mythological Greece. No single angle within the villa allows one to view all of the images present. Instead, one is required to move around the villa, looking at different combinations of pieces. This logistical fact allows viewers to draw on larger themes of Greek mythology, especially on the relationships between the powerful men and women and also the deities of ancient Greece.

== Gallery ==
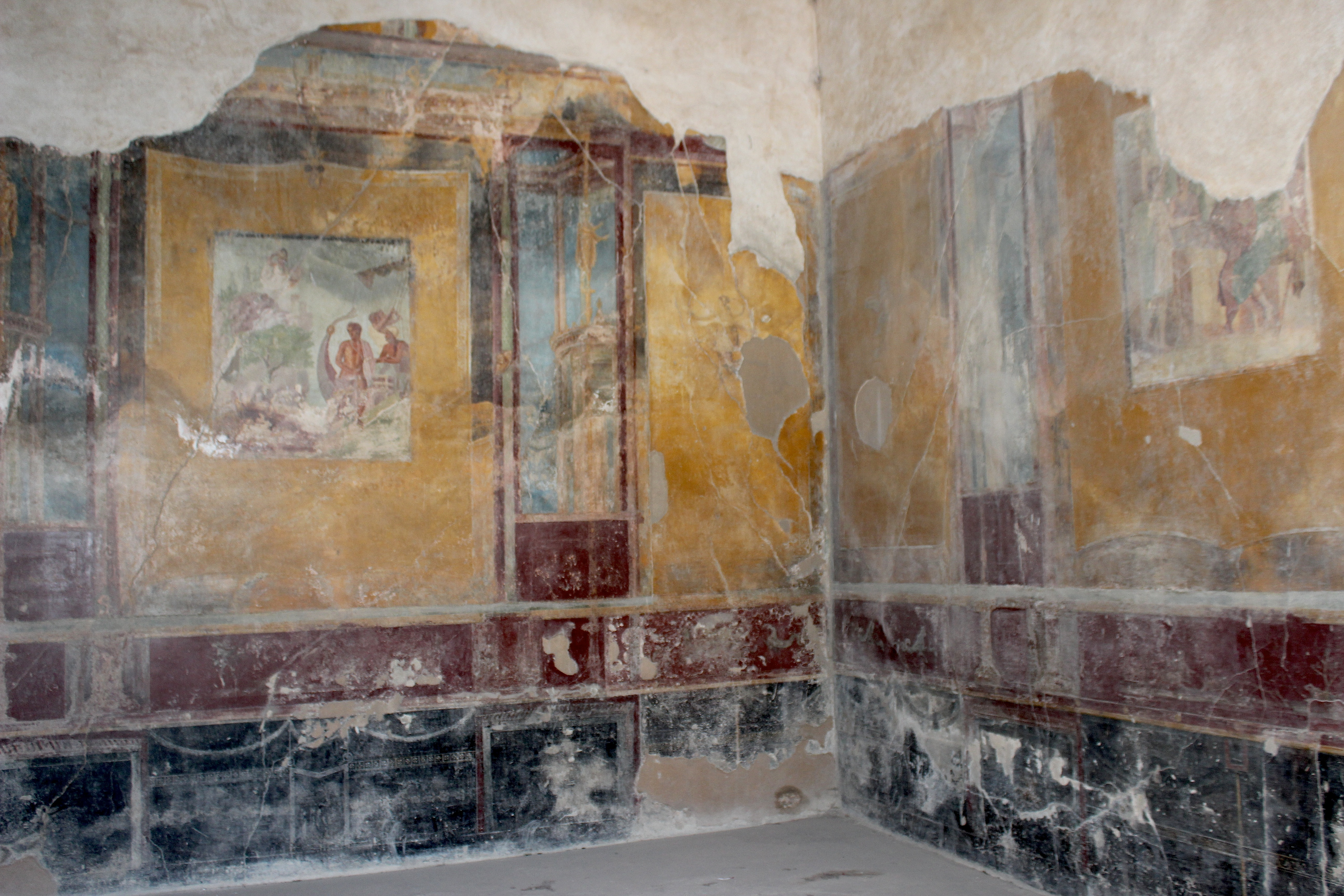
Juxtaposed murals in the atrium

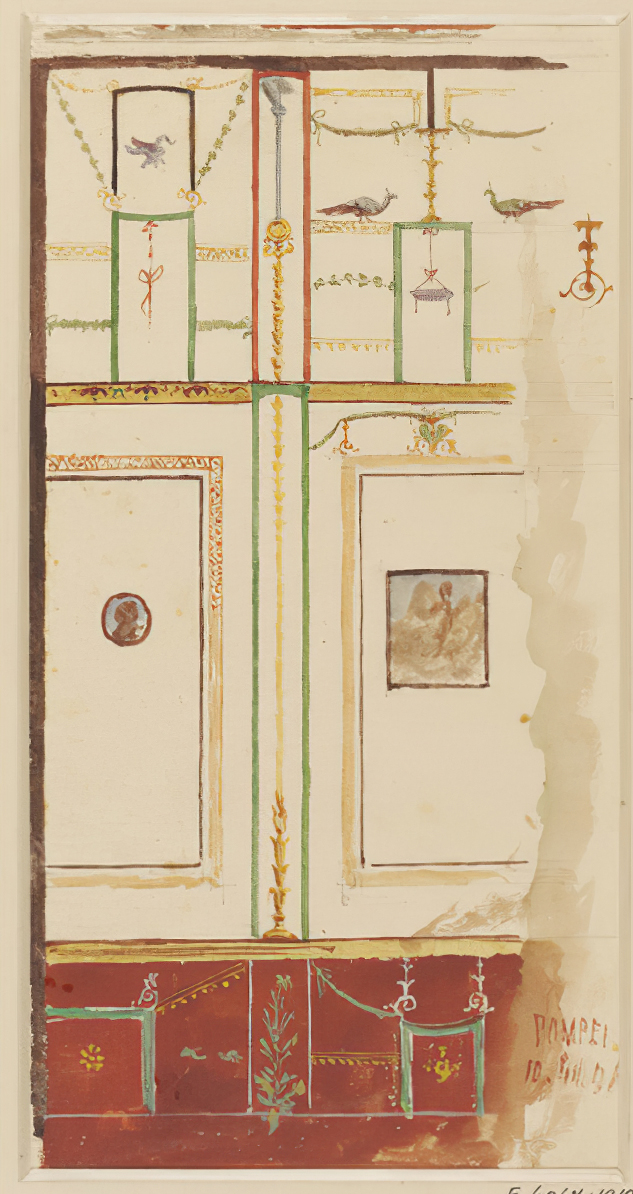
Frescoed wall

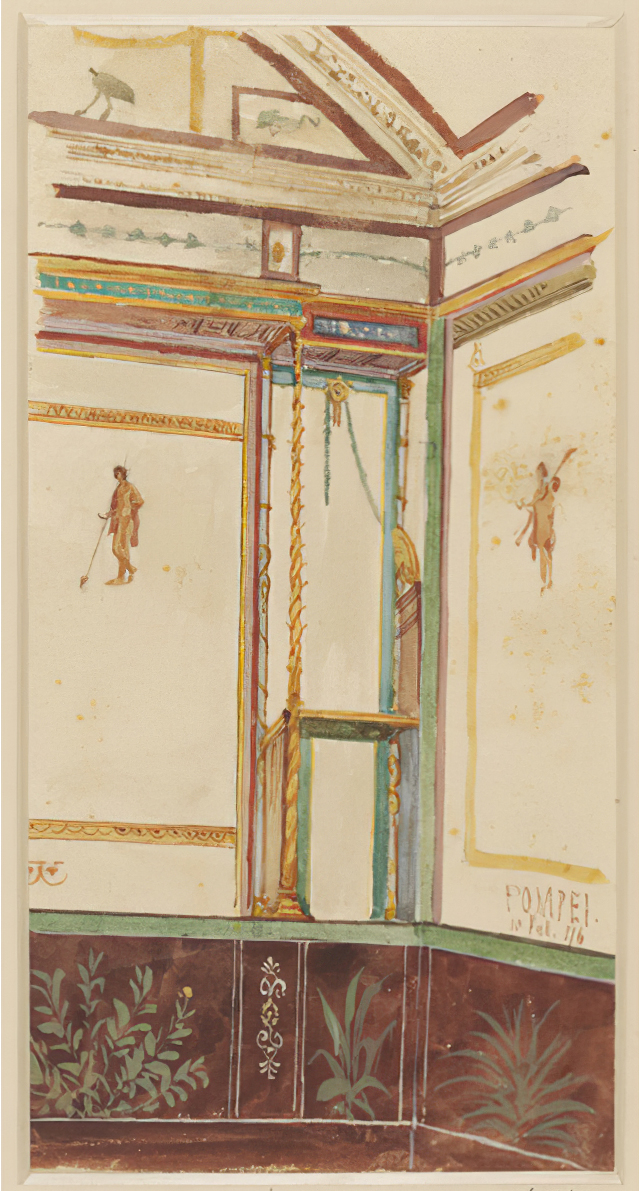
Frescoed wall

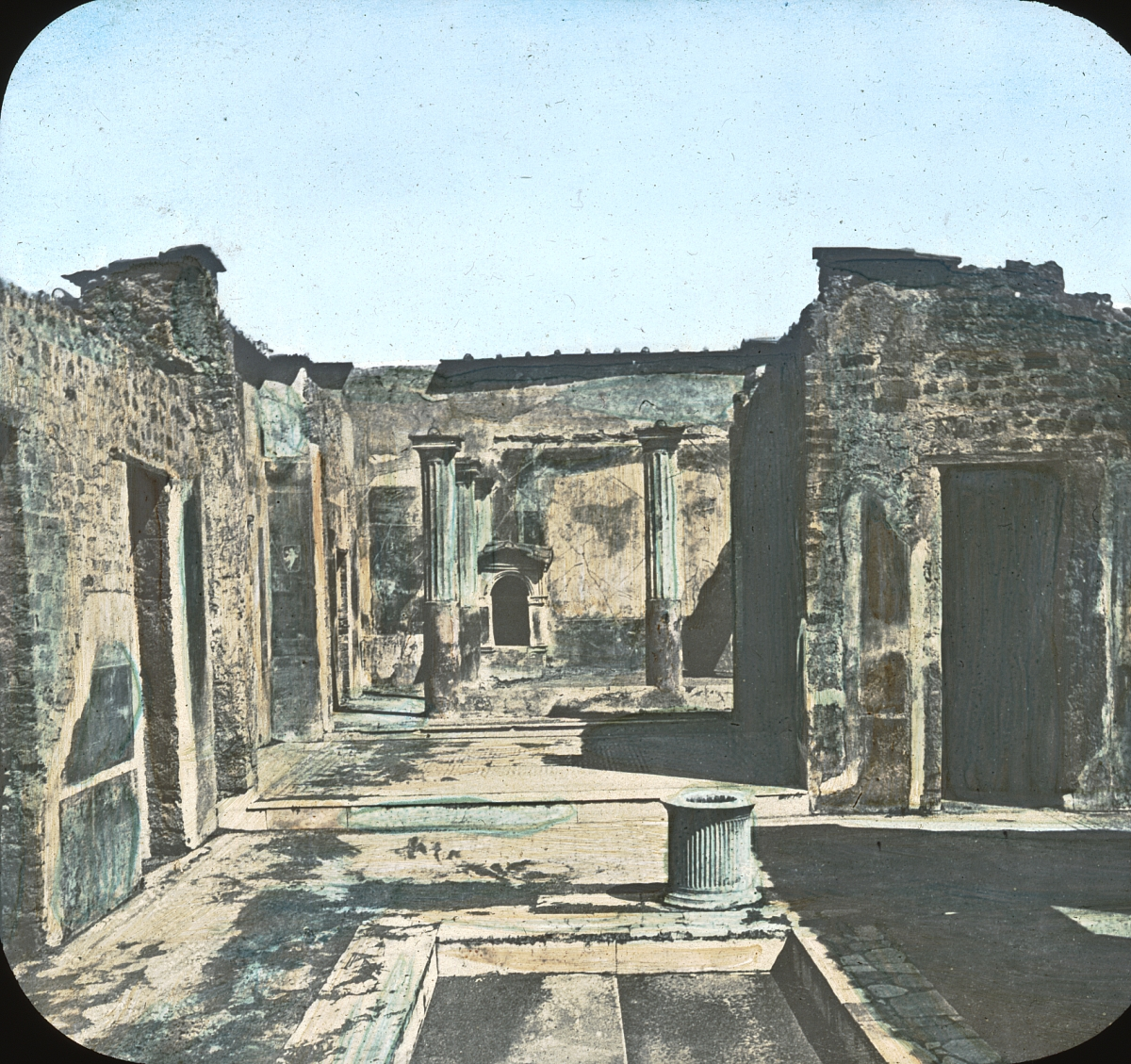
Brooklyn Museum Archives, Goodyear Archival Collection
