= Sherwin Bitsui =

American artist

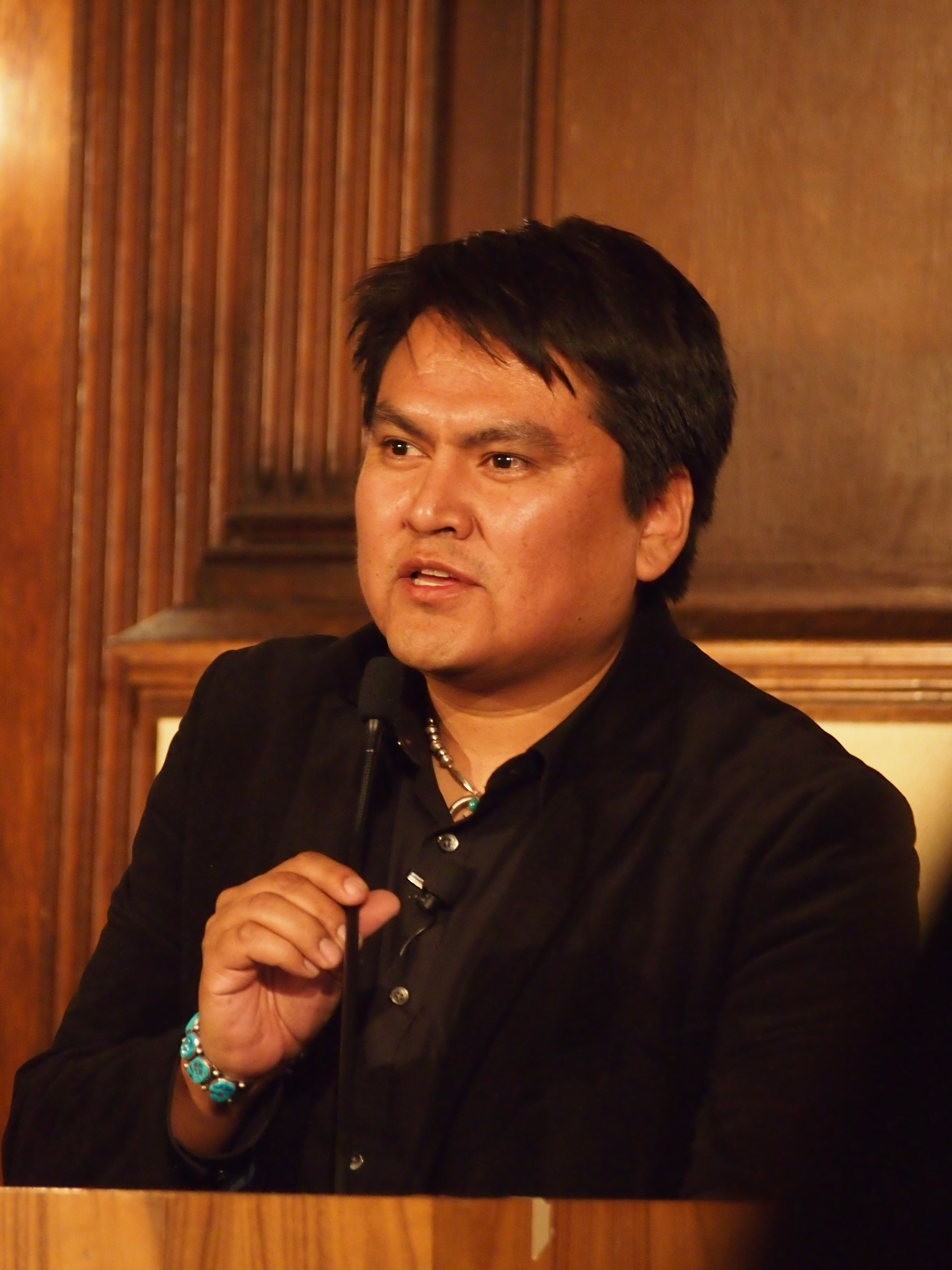
- Born: 1975 (age 50–51); Holbrook, Arizona
- Occupations: Writer, painter
- Writing career
- Genre: Poetry
- Notable work: Flood Song
- Notable awards: American Book Award; PEN Open Book Award
- Website: bitsui.com

Sherwin Bitsui is a Navajo writer and poet. His book of poems, Flood Song (2009), won the American Book Award and the PEN Open Book Award.

== Life and education ==
Bitsui was born in 1975. He is originally from Whitecone, Arizona. He is Navajo; his mother was Todichʼíiʼnii (Bitter Water Clan), while his father was Tłʼízíłání (Many Goats Clan).

He holds an AFA from the Institute of American Indian Arts Creative Writing Program. He is the recipient of the 2000-01 Individual Poet Grant from the Witter Bynner Foundation for Poetry, the 1999 Truman Capote Creative Writing Fellowship, a Soul Mountain Residency, a Lannan Foundation Literary Residency Fellowship and a 2006 Whiting Award. In 2012, he was honored with an NACF Artist Fellowship in Literature. He has served in visiting faculty positions, including distinguished visiting, Eminent Writer for the University of Wyoming, Visiting Hugo Writer University of Montana, and San Diego State University, where he has been on creative writing faculty since 2013. Since 2013, he has served on the faculty of the Institute of American Indian Arts in the Low Residency MFA in Creative Writing program.

He currently lives in Tucson, Arizona.

== Writing ==
Sherwin has published poems in American Poet, The Iowa Review, Frank (Paris), Lit Magazine, and elsewhere.

His poems were also anthologized in Legitimate Dangers: American Poets of the New Century and Sing: Poetry from the Indigenous Americas.

A common theme within Bitsui's poems is the exploration of difference between values, concepts and ideas when experienced in Navajo as opposed to English.

His book, Flood Song, was published in 2009 and won an American Book Award in 2010. His most recent book of poetry, The Next Sky, was published in 2026.

== Published works ==
=== Collections ===
- Bitsui (2003). Shapeshift. University of Arizona Press. ISBN 978-0-8165-2342-9.
- —— (2009). Flood Song. Copper Canyon Press. ISBN 978-1-55659-308-6.
- —— (2018). Dissolve. Copper Canyon Press. ISBN 978-1-55659-5455.
- Bitsui (2026). The Next Sky. Copper Canyon Press. ISBN 978-1-55659-733-6.
