= Tennessee Chairs of Excellence =

Historical/current government program

The Tennessee Chairs of Excellence program was established during a period of educational reform in 1984, under Governor Lamar Alexander's "Better Schools" Program. While most of that program focused on improvements to K-12 education, some money went to higher education: increases to general funding, the Chairs of Excellence program, and the Centers of Excellence program. The purpose of the Chairs of Excellence program was to attract and retain nationally (or regionally) recognized scholars to four-year academic institutions within the state. In theory, this would attract private funding to the state, improve research initiatives, improve the quality of higher education for undergraduate and graduate students, and raise the state's national and international educational standing, hence increasing the schools' global competitiveness. All four-year state colleges and universities qualify to participate in this program, including the UT Space Institute. Since 1984, 100 Chairs of Excellence have been established across the state's institutions. There was a brief suspension in the creation of new chairs, but that was short-lived, though only two chairs have been established since 2000, with the most recent being at Middle Tennessee State University in 2013. The Chairs of Excellence are currently under the Tennessee Higher Education Commission (THEC)., and the Tennessee Department of the Treasury's Investment Division manages the assets of the Chairs of Excellence Trust. Each chair had a designated purpose upon its respective inception, each furthering the educational mission of the state, though many of those objectives have evolved in practice.

== Austin Peay State University ==
There are four Chairs of Excellence at Austin Peay State University. In order of establishment, they are the following:

- Roy Acuff Chair of Excellence in Creative Arts (est. March 1986)
- APSU Foundation Chair of Excellence in Free Enterprise (est. June 1987)
- Harper-Bourne Chair of Excellence in Business (est. June 1987)
- Lenora C. Reuther Chair of Excellence in Nursing (est. September 1993)

== East Tennessee State University ==
There are eight Chairs of Excellence at East Tennessee State University. In order of establishment, they are the following:

- Cecile Cox Quillen Chair of Excellence in Education (est. January 1986)
- AFG Industries Chair of Excellence in Business and Technology (est. March 1987)
- Allen and Ruth Harris Chair of Excellence in Business (est. June 1988)
- Carroll H. Long Chair of Excellence for Surgical Research (est. June 1989)
- Paul Dishner Chair of Excellence in Medicine (est. November 1989)
- James H. Quillen Chair of Excellence in Education (est. March 1994)
- Wayne G. Basler Chair of Excellence for the Integration of the Arts, Rhetoric, and Science (est. January 1995)
- LeeAnne Brown and ETSU Physicians & Associates Chair of Clinical Excellence (est. December 1995)

== Middle Tennessee State University ==
There are ten Chairs of Excellence at Middle Tennessee State University. In order of establishment, they are the following:

- John Seigenthaler Chair of Excellence in First Amendment Studies (est. March 1986)
- Jennings A. Jones Chair of Excellence in Free Enterprise (est. March 1986)
- Carl Adams Chair of Excellence in Health Care Services (est. June 1987)
- National Health Care Chair of Excellence in Nursing (est. June 1988)
- Robert E. and Georgianna West Russell Chair of Excellence in Manufacturing (est. June 1988)
- Katherine Davis Murfree Chair of Excellence in Dyslexic Studies (est. June 1988)
- Mary E. Miller Chair of Excellence in Equine Health (est. June 1995)
- John C. Miller Chair of Excellence in Equine Reproductive Physiology (est. June 1995)
- Jennings and Rebecca Jones Chair of Excellence in Urban and Regional Planning (est. March 1997)
- Joey A. Jacobs Chair of Excellence in Accountancy (est. June 2013)

== Tennessee State University ==
There are two Chairs of Excellence at Tennessee State University. In order of establishment, they are the following:

- Frist Chair of Excellence in Business (est. July 1992)
- Chair of Excellence in Banking and Financial Services (est. March 1998)

== Tennessee Technological University ==
There are two Chairs of Excellence at Tennessee Technological University. In order of establishment, they are the following:

- Jesse E. Owen Chair of Excellence in Emerging Technologies, System Management, IT Human Resources, and Strategic Management (est. June 1988)
- William E. Mayberry Chair of Excellence in Business Administration (est. February 1990)

== University of Memphis ==
There are 24 Chairs of Excellence at the University of Memphis. In order of establishment, they are the following:

- W. Harry Feinstone Chair of Excellence in Molecular Biology (est. September 1984)
- Herbert Herff Chair of Excellence in Law (est. September 1984)
- Sales and Marketing Executives Inc. Chair of Excellence in Sales (est. June 1986)
- Thompson-Hill Chair of Excellence in Accountancy (est. June 1986)
- Morris S. Fogelman Chair of Excellence in Real Estate (est. June 1986)
- James T. Thompson Chair of Excellence in Accounting Education (est. September 1986)
- Lillian and Morrie Moss Chair of Excellence in Philosophy (est. December 1986)
- Bornblum Chair of Excellence in Judaic Studies (est. March 1987)
- Wunderlich Chair of Excellence in Finance (est. March 1987)
- Herbert Herff Chair of Excellence Biomedical Engineering (II) (est. March 1987)
- Lillian and Morrie Moss Chair of Excellence in Computer Science (est. June 1987)
- William N. Morris Chair of Excellence in International Economics (est. June 1987)
- Robert Wang Chair of Excellence in International Business (est. June 1987)
- Chair of Excellence in Free Enterprise Management (est. June 1987)
- Herbert Herff Chair of Excellence Biomedical Engineering (I) (est. June 1987)
- Dorothy Kayser Hohenberg Chair of Excellence (est. June 1988)
- William A. and Ruth F. Loewenberg Chair of Excellence in Nursing (est. June 1988)
- Federal Express Chair of Excellence in Management Information Systems (est. June 1989)
- Lillian and Morrie Moss Chair of Excellence in Psychology (est. March 1991)
- Lillian and Morrie Moss Chair of Excellence in Urban Education (est. March 1991)
- Jabie Sanford Hardin III Chair of Excellence in Combinatorics (est. August 1993)
- Helen and Jabie Hardin Chair of Excellence in Economics/Managerial Journalism (est. June 1995)
- Sparks Family Chair of Excellence in Global Research Leadership (est. December 1996)
- Plough Chair of Excellence in Audiology and Speech-Language Pathology (est. August 2000)

== University of Tennessee at Chattanooga ==
There are ten Chairs of Excellence at the University of Tennessee at Chattanooga that are part of the Tennessee Chairs of Excellence program. In order of establishment, they are the following:

- Burkett Miller Chair of Excellence in Management and Technology (est. October 1985)
- SunTrust Bank Chair of Excellence in Humanities (est. May 1986)
- Unum Provident Chair of Excellence in Applied Mathematics (est. May 1986)
- George R. West, Jr. Chair of Excellence in Communication and Public Affairs (est. November 1986)
- Chair of Excellence in Judaic Studies (est. April 1987)
- J. Burton Frierson Chair of Excellence in Business Leadership (est. April 1987)
- Walter M. Cline, Jr. Chair of Excellence in Physical Therapy (est. April 1987)
- Clarence E. Harris Chair of Excellence in Business and Entrepreneurship (est. May 1988)
- Lyndhurst Foundation Chair of Excellence in Arts Education (est. August 1996)
- O. D. McKee Chair of Excellence in Learning (est. December 1998)

More recently, the University established the W. Max Finley Chair for Excellence in Business, Free Enterprise and Capitalism in the Gary W. Rollins College of Business in 2015, but that is not part of the official state-sponsored Chairs of Excellence program.

== University of Tennessee Health Science Center ==
There are 19 Chairs of Excellence at the University of Tennessee Health Science Center. In order of establishment, they are the following:

- Harriet S. Van Vleet Chair of Excellence in Microbiology and Immunology (est. March 1985)
- Harriet S. Van Vleet Chair of Excellence in Pharmacology (est. March 1985)
- Harriet S. Van Vleet Chair of Excellence in Biochemistry (est. October 1985)
- Harriet S. Van Vleet Chair of Excellence in Virology (est. October 1985)
- E. Erick Muirhead Chair of Excellence in Pathology (est. February 1986)
- Crippled Children's Hospital Foundation Chair of Excellence in Biomedical Engineering (est. September 1986)
- Le Bonheur Chair of Excellence in Pediatrics (1st chair) (est. September 1986)
- University of Tennessee Medical Group Chair of Excellence in Obstetrics and Gynecology (est. September 1986)
- Plough Foundation Chair of Excellence in Pediatrics (est. November 1986)
- First Tennessee Chair of Excellence in Clinical Pharmacy and Pediatrics (est. April 1987)
- J. R. Hyde Chair of Excellence in Rehabilitation Engineering (est. April 1987)
- Thomas A. Gerwin Chair of Excellence in Physiology (est. April 1987)
- William and Dorothy Dunavant Chair of Excellence in Pediatrics (est. April 1987)
- Federal Express Chair of Excellence in Pediatrics (est. September 1987)
- Semmes Murphey Chair of Excellence in Neurology (est. September 1987)
- Maury W. Bronstein Chair of Excellence in Cardiovascular Physiology (est. August 1988)
- Goodman Chair of Excellence in Medicine (est. September 1989)
- Le Bonheur Chair of Excellence in Pediatrics (2nd chair) (est. September 1989)
- Mark S. Soloway Chair of Excellence in Urology (est. August 1992)

== University of Tennessee at Knoxville ==
There are 18 Chairs of Excellence at the University of Tennessee, Knoxville. In order of establishment, they are the following:

- Hodges Chair of Excellence in English (est. April 1985)
- Ivan Racheff Chair of Excellence in Materials Science & Engineering (est. April 1985)
- Ivan Racheff Chair of Excellence in Plant Molecular Genetics (est. April 1985)
- Robert Condra Chair of Computer Integrated Engineering and Manufacturing (est. May 1986)
- Robert Condra Chair of Excellence in Power Electronics Applications (est. May 1986)
- Pilot Oil Corporation Chair of Excellence in Leadership (est. November 1986)
- Bernadotte E. Schmitt Chair of Excellence in History (est. September 1987)
- J. Fred Holly Chair of Excellence in Economics (est. September 1987)
- Julia G. and Alfred G. Hill Chair of Excellence in Science, Technology, and Medical Writing (est. September 1987)
- Edward J. and Carolyn P. Boling Chair of Excellence in Space Propulsion (est. November 1987)
- Forrest and Patsy Shumway Chair of Excellence in Romance Languages (est. November 1987)
- Henry Goodrich Chair of Excellence in Waste Management & Environmental Engineering (est. May 1998)
- Clayton Homes Chair of Excellence in Finance (est. August 1998)
- Harry and Vivienne Bruce Chair of Excellence in Business (est. September 1989)
- Bernard Blasingame Chair of Excellence in Agricultural Policy (est. November 1989)
- Willis Lincoln Chair of Excellence in Physics (est. August 1992)
- Nancy Gore Hunger Chair of Excellence in Environmental Studies (est. September 1994)
- H. H. Arnold Chair of Excellence in Computational Mechanics (est. December 1996)

== University of Tennessee at Martin ==
There are three Chairs of Excellence at the University of Tennessee at Martin. In order of establishment, they are the following:

- The Tom E. Hendrix Chair of Excellence in Free Enterprise was established in March 1985 to promote regional entrepreneurial activity, aid in providing economic development opportunities for University and K-12 students, and to improve the quality and quantity of scholarly output in economics. This chair sponsors conferences (e.g., Tennessee Jump$tart and the Experiential Learning Leadership Institute), community economic initiatives (e.g., the Regional Entrepreneurship & Economic Development Center, Community Needs Assessment, and regional consumer price index compilation and analysis), and a variety of student experiential learning opportunities.
- The Horace and Sara Dunagan Chair of Excellence in Banking was established in 1988 to facilitate interaction between the University, its students, and local community banks. The Chair initially developed and continues to host the annual Mid-South Agricultural Finance Conference, which held its 26th conference in August 2024. This chair leads a team of students to compete annually in the National Community Bank Case Study Competition, which it has won three times.
- The Gilbert Parker Chair of Excellence in Food and Fiber was established in 1988 to provide leadership to outreach events, coordinate the Master of Science degree in Agriculture and Natural Resource Systems Management (MSANR), and increase the university's scholarly output. This chair co-sponsors the Mid-South Agricultural Finance Conference.
