= Beware of the dog =

Warning sign

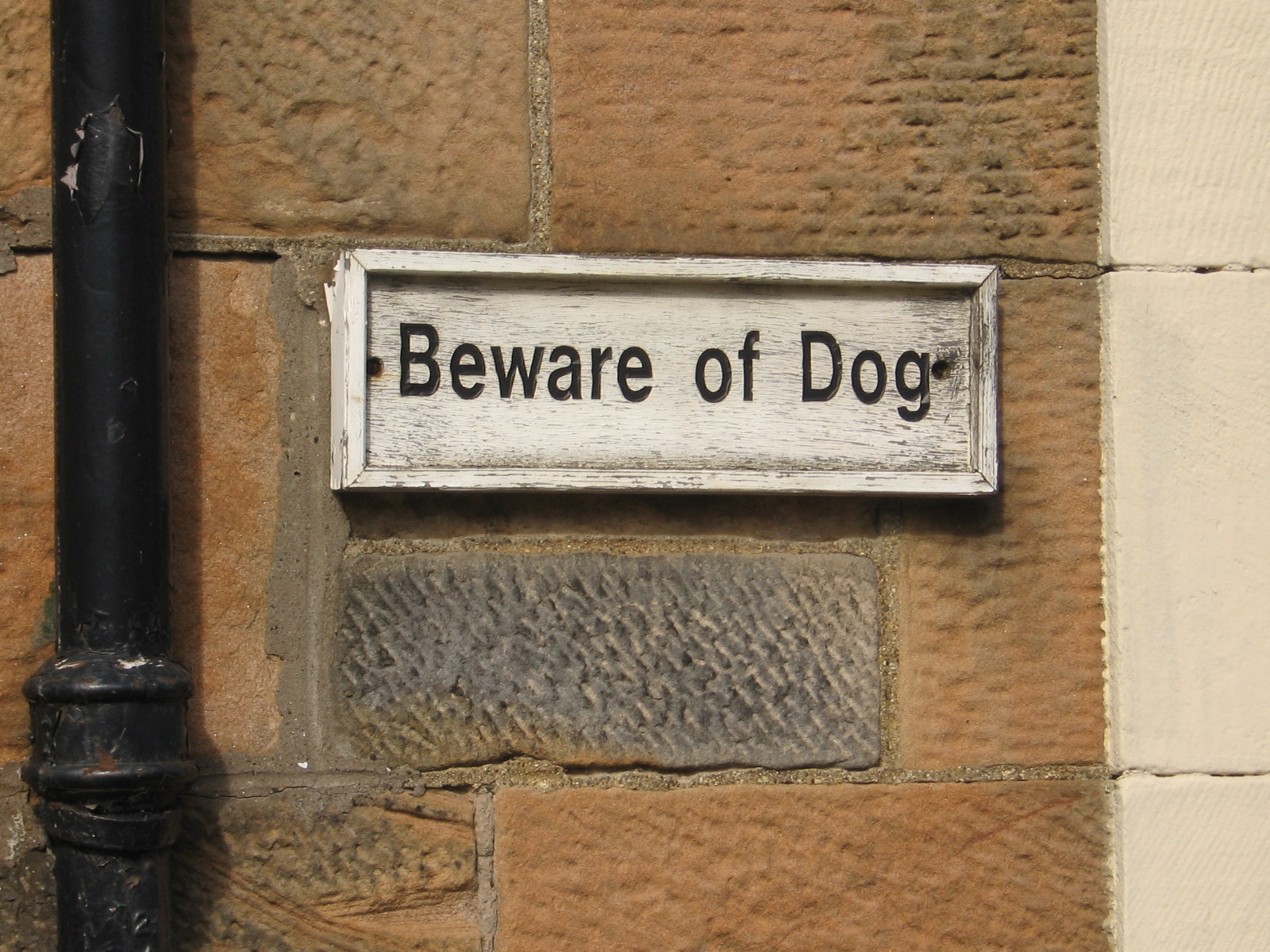
Notice at the Glasgow Necropolis

Beware of the dog (also rendered as beware of dog) is a warning sign posted at the entrance to a building or other private area indicating that a dangerous dog is within. Such signs may be placed to deter burglary even if there is no dog, or if the dog is not actually a competent guard dog.

== History ==
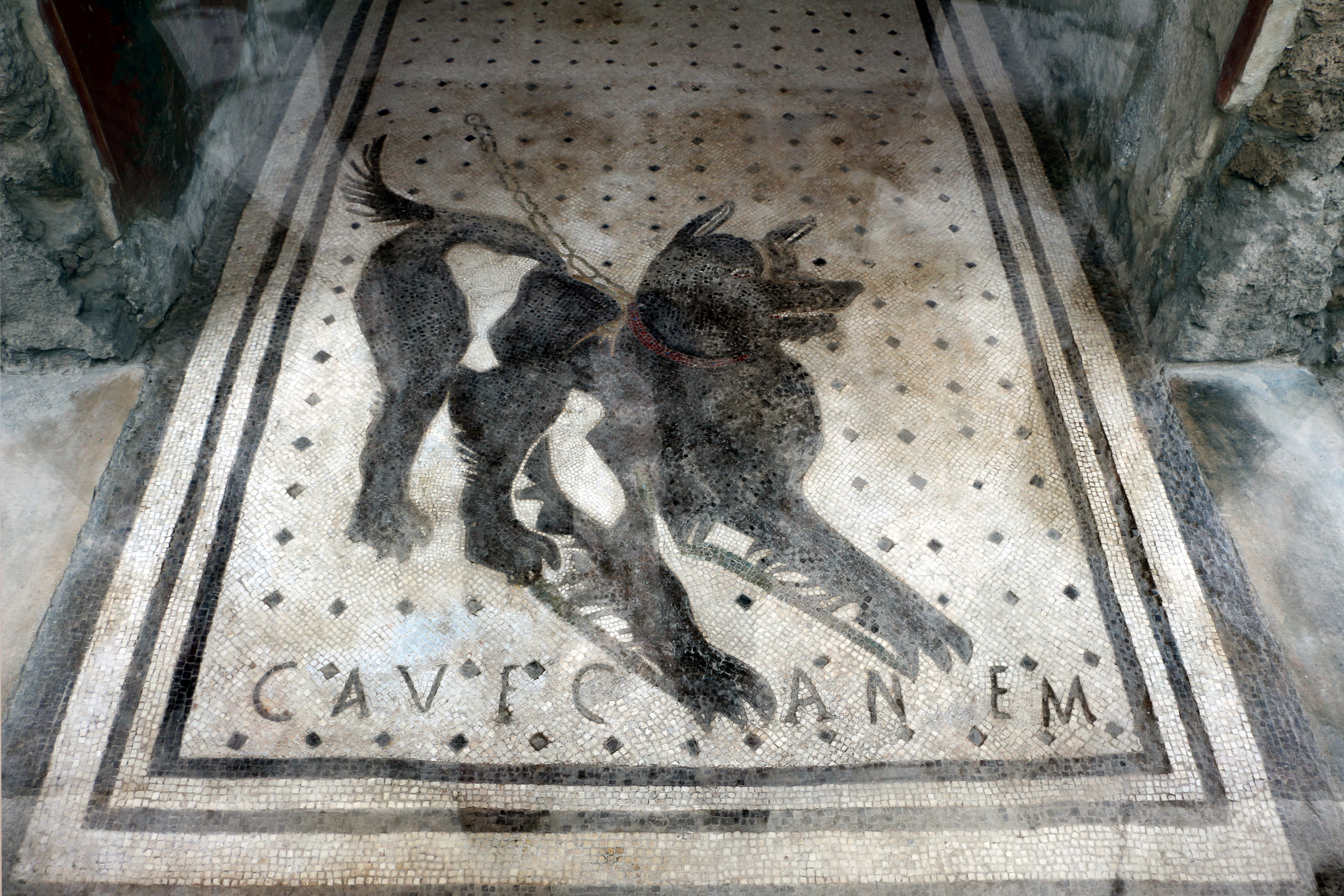
Cave canem Roman mosaic at the entrance to the House of the Tragic Poet in Pompeii, Italy, 1st century AD

Warning signs of this sort have been found in ancient Roman buildings such as the House of the Tragic Poet in Pompeii, which contains a mosaic with the caption cave canem (pronounced [ˈkäu̯eː ˈkänɛ̃ˑ]). The Roman work Satyricon, written by Petronius, includes a passage mentioning the phrase cave canem painted on a wall with large letters, in the chapter Dinner with Trimalchio.

Philippians 3:2 is translated as "beware of the dogs" or "beware of dogs" in the King James Bible and many other editions. For example:

Beware of dogs, beware of evil workers, beware of the concision.

This is often interpreted as a euphemism, bad people having been described as dogs in a number of previous biblical passages. Nonetheless, the yard signs are sometimes alluded to in reference to the passage. The use of such signs in the Roman world may have influenced the author of the passage, and conversely the passage may have influenced the wording of the more modern yard signs.

== Law ==
Under English law, placing such a sign does not relieve the owner of responsibility for any harm which may come to people attacked by the dog. Where a company employs the services of a guard dog, Section 1(3) of the Guard Dogs Act 1975 requires "a notice containing a warning that a guard dog is present is clearly exhibited at each entrance to the premises." Under Japanese law, only dogs deemed as "dangerous dogs" require signage to indicate possible danger.

== Gallery ==
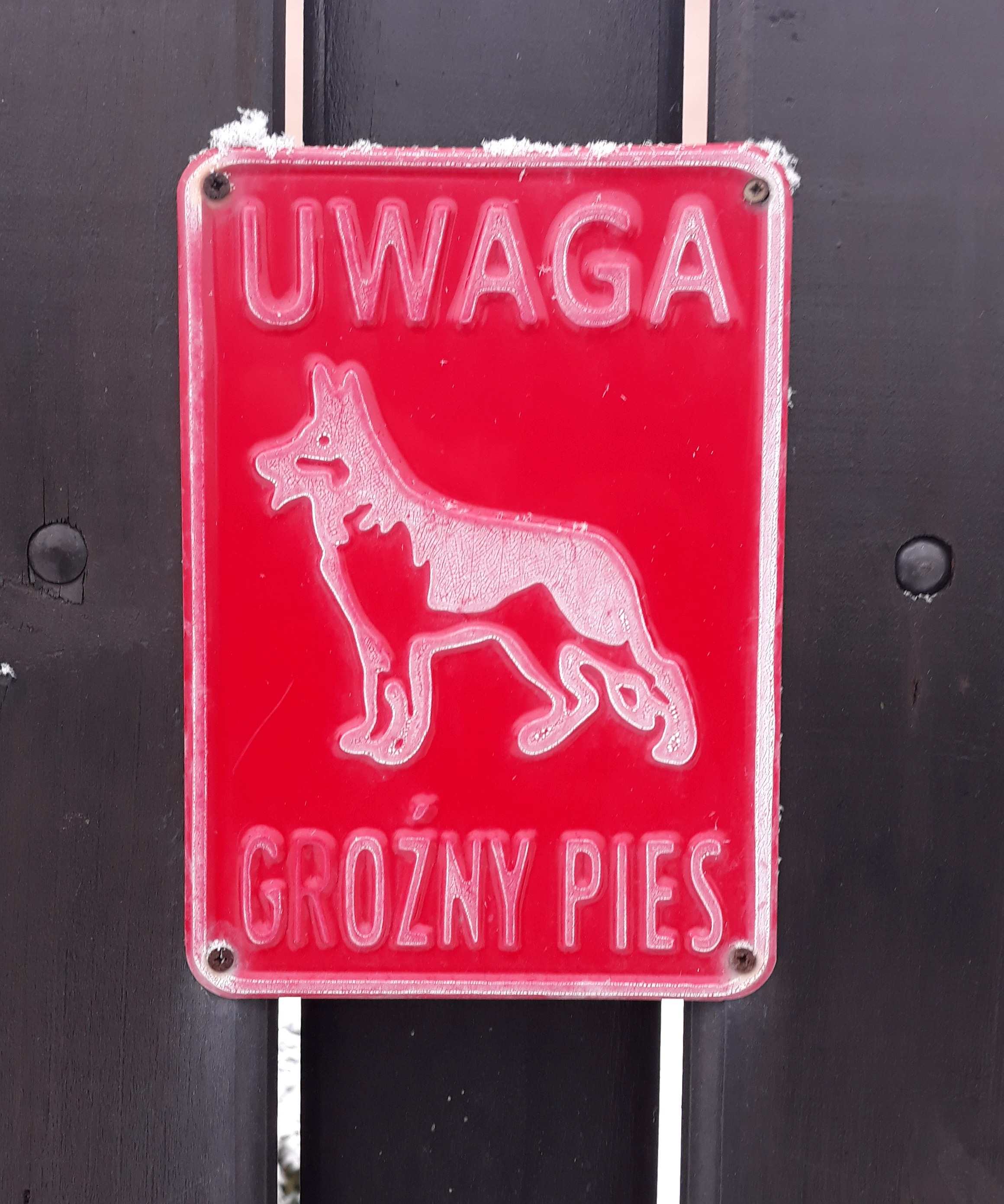
Polish sign

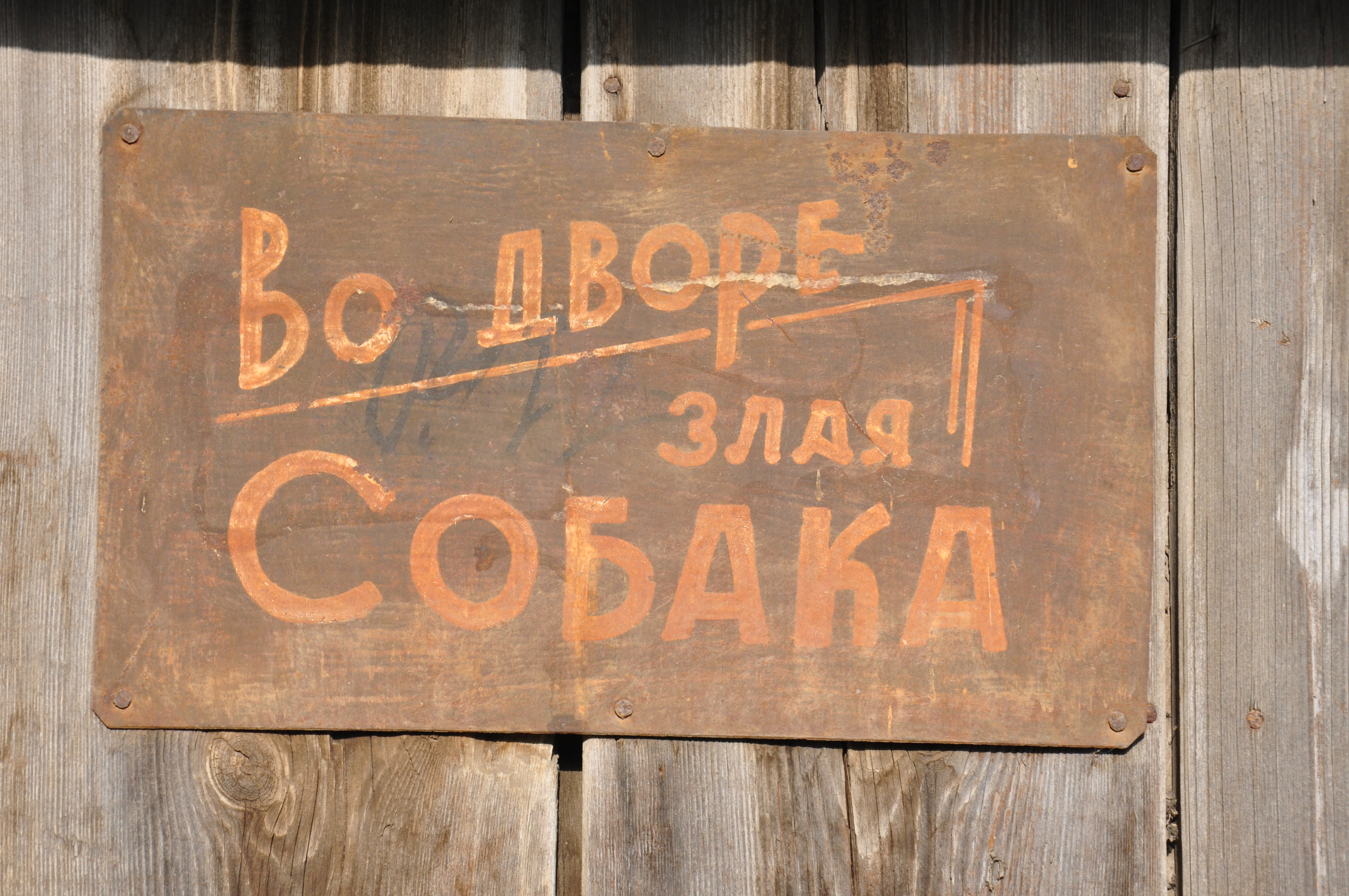
Old Russian sign

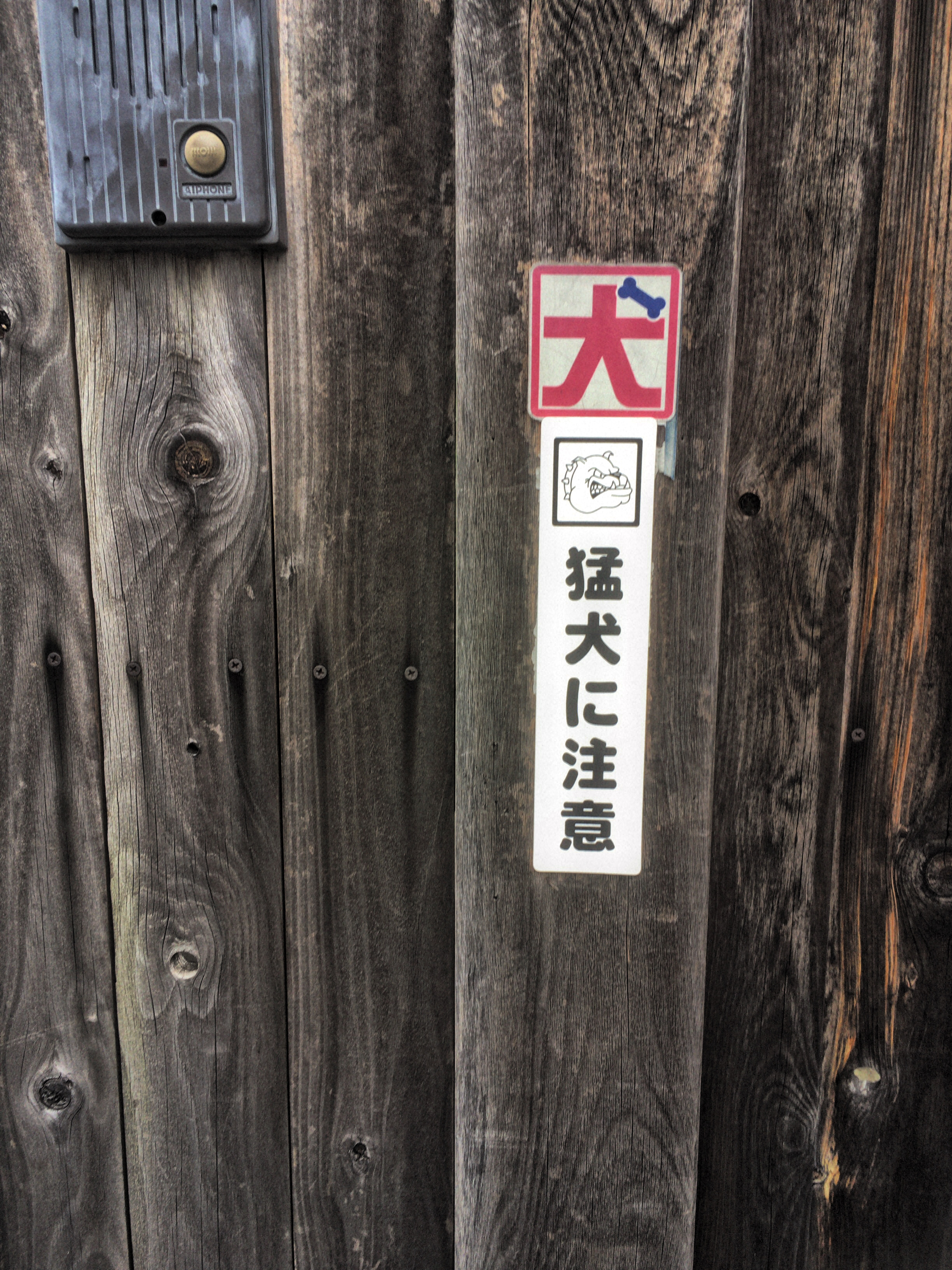
Sign in Japan

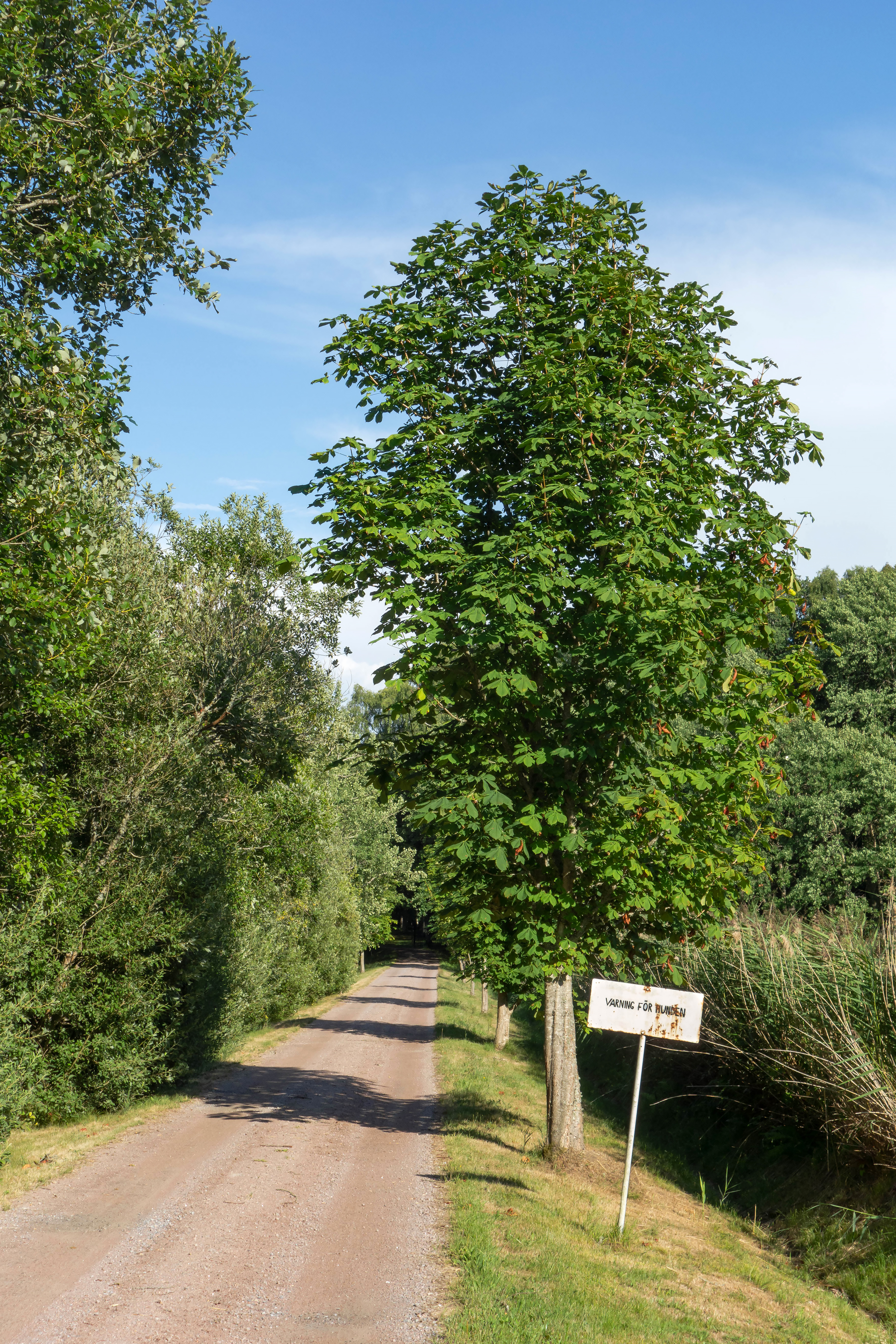
Rural sign in Sweden

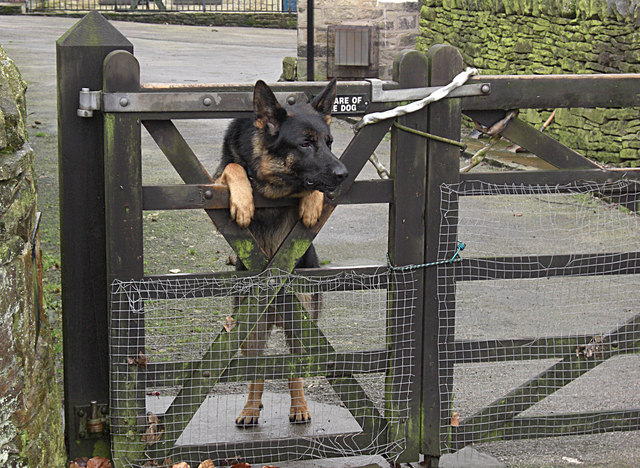
German Shepherd on guard beside a sign near Mellor, Greater Manchester
