= Blanche (given name) =

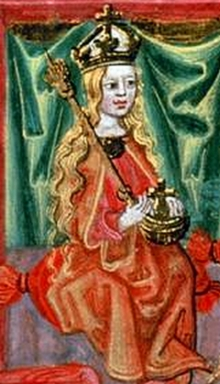
- Blanche of Valois was one of several royal bearers of the name.
- Gender: Primarily feminine

Origin
- Meaning: White

Other names
- Related names: Bianca, Blanca, Branca, Blandine, Blandina

Blanche is a feminine given name. It means "white" in French, derived from the Late Latin word "blancus". It possibly originated as a nickname or descriptive name for a girl with blonde hair or extremely fair skin. It has been in use since the medieval era, influenced by Blanche of Navarre and her descendants who married into European royal houses.

== Usage ==
The name was among the 100 most popular baby names in France between 1900 and 1928, and among the top 500 names for girls at different points between 1929 and 1969, and again between 1995 and 2022. It was among 100 most popular names for girls born in the United States between 1880 and 1919, and remained among the 1,000 most popular names for American girls until 1964. It was also among the 1,000 most popular names for American boys at different points between 1887 and 1908. It was among the top 100 names for girls in Canada between 1920 and 1923. It was also among the top 100 names for girls in England and Wales in 1904.

== People ==
=== French royalty ===
- Blanche of Castile (1188–1252), Queen of France, granddaughter of Blanca of Navarre (daughter of Garcia VI)
- Blanche of Navarre, Queen of France (Blanche d'Évreux, 1330–1398)
- Blanche of France, Infanta of Castile (1253–1323), daughter of King Louis IX of France, wife of Fernando, the eldest son of Alfonso X of Castile
- Blanche of France, Duchess of Austria (c. 1278 – 1305), daughter of King Philip II of France, wife of Rudolf I of Bohemia
- Blanche of France (nun) (1313–1358), daughter of King Philip V of France
- Blanche of France, Duchess of Orléans (1328–1382), posthumous daughter of King Charles IV of France, Duchess consort of Orleans
- Blanche of Burgundy, Queen of France

=== Navarrese royalty ===
- Blanche of Navarre, Queen of Castile (after 1133 – 1156), daughter of García Ramírez of Navarre, wife of King Sancho III of Castile
- Blanche of Navarre, Countess of Champagne (died 1229), Countess of Champagne and regent of Navarre
- Blanche of Artois (1248–1302), queen consort and regent of Navarre
- Blanche of Navarre, Duchess of Brittany (1226–1283), also known as Blanche of Champagne, wife of duke John I of Brittany
- Blanche I of Navarre (1385–1441), queen regnant of Navarre, wife of John II of Navarre
- Blanche II of Navarre (1424–1464), daughter of Blanche I of Navarre; pretender of Navarre, divorced Queen of Castile

=== Other nobility ===
- Blanche of Namur (1320–1363), queen-consort of Norway and Sweden
- Duchess Blanche of England (1392–1409), also known as Blanche of Lancaster, daughter of King Henry IV
- Blanche of Brittany (1271–1327), mother of Robert III of Artois
- Blanche of Sicily, wife of Robert III of Flanders
- Blanche of Anjou (1280–1310), wife of James II of Aragon
- Lady Blanche Arundell (1583 or c. 1584–1649), wife of Thomas Arundell, 2nd Baron Arundell of Wardour
- Blanche de Brienne, Baroness Tingry (c. 1252 – c. 1302)
- Blanche del Carretto (1432–1458), Lady Consort of Monaco
- Lady Blanche, daughter of Charles Noel, 2nd Earl of Gainsborough
- Blanche of Valois (1316–1348), wife of Charles IV, Holy Roman Emperor

=== Other people ===
- Blanche (singer), stage name of Belgian singer and songwriter Ellie Delvaux
- Blanche d'Alpuget (born 1944), Australian novelist and biographer, second wife of Australian Prime Minister Bob Hawke
- Blanche Auzello (c. 1897 – 1969), French American hotelier and resistance member
- Blanche Badcock (1892–1957), British rifle shooter
- Blanche Baker (born 1956), American actress
- Blanche Hermine Barbot (1842–1919), Belgian-American musical director and pianist
- Blanche Barrow (1911–1988), wife of Buck Barrow
- Blanche Bates (1873–1941), American actress
- Blanche Bernstein (died 1993), American economist
- Blanche Bingley (1863–1946), English tennis player
- Blanche Blanchard (1866–1959), American landscape artist from New Orleans
- Blanche Bolduc (1906/1907–1998), Canadian folk singer
- Blanche Brillon Macdonald (1931–1985), Canadian Métis politician
- Blanche Bruce (1841–1898), first African-American to serve a full term in the United States Senate
- Blanche Calloway (1902–1978), African-American jazz singer
- Blanche Carstenson (1907–2002), American batik artist, printmaker, painter, and textile collagist
- Blanche Crozier (1881–1957), Canadian actress
- Blanche Wiesen Cook (born 1941), American professor of history and author
- Blanche Denège (1876–1957), French actress
- Blanche Deschamps-Jéhin (1857–1923), French operatic contralto
- Blanche Dugdale (1880–1948), British author and Zionist
- Blanche Friderici (1878–1933), American film and stage actress
- Blanche Gardin (born 1977), French actress, comedian and writer
- Blanche Gates (1918–2023), Canadian Anglican liturgist
- Blanche Jenkins (active 1872–1915), British portrait painter
- Blanche Lazzell (1878–1956), American modernist painter and printmaker
- Blanche Douglass Leathers, first female steamboat captain
- Blanche Lincoln (born 1960), senator from Arkansas
- Blanche Lohéac-Ammoun (1912–2011), Lebanese French painter, illustrator, and writer
- Blanche Martin (born 1937), American Football League player
- Blanche Pritchard McCrum (1887–1969), librarian and president of the Association of college and Research Libraries
- Blanche McManus (1869–1935), American writer and artist
- Blanche L. McSmith (1920–2006), American politician
- Blanche Hoschedé Monet (1865–1947), French painter, both stepdaughter and daughter-in law of Claude Monet
- Blanche Moore Haines (1865–1944), American physician
- Blanche Noyes (1900–1981), American aviator
- Blanche Oelrichs (1890–1950), American actress and poet
- Blanche Pitney (1898–1986), American politician
- Blanche Ravalec (born 1954), French actress
- Blanche Scott (1885–1970), American aviator
- Blanche Slocum (1885–1960), American contralto singer
- Blanche Sweet (1896–1986), American early silent film actress
- Blanche Thebom (1915–2010), American operatic soprano
- Blanche Thornycroft (1873–1950), British naval architect
- Blanche Walsh (1873–1915), American actress
- Blanche Yurka (1887–1974), American stage and film actress and director

=== Fictional characters ===
- Blanche, an ostrich villager in Animal Crossing: New Leaf and New Horizons
- Blanche Devereaux, in the television series The Golden Girls and The Golden Palace
- Blanche DuBois, in the play A Streetcar Named Desire and its adaptations
- The title character of the 1948 British film Blanche Fury, played by Valerie Hobson
- Blanche Hunt, the character in the British soap opera Coronation Street, portrayed by Maggie Jones
- Blanche Ingram, from the novel Jane Eyre
- Madamoiselle Blanche De Cominges, from Dostoyevsky's novel The Gambler
- Blanche White, in the board game Cluedo (Clue in US)
- Blanca Trueba, in Isabel Allende's novel The House of the Spirits
- Blanche Buck, in the 1967 film Bonnie and Clyde
- Blanche, a white cat in 1977 Japanese surrealistic horror film Hausu
- Blanche, Kaede Saitou's angel in the anime and manga series Angelic Layer
- Blanche Hudson, in What Ever Happened to Baby Jane?.
- Blanche Norton, from the 1950s comedy show, The George Burns and Gracie Allen Show. Bea Benaderet played the character.
- Blanche, Team Mystic's leader from 2016 mobile game Pokémon Go.
- Sister Blanche, in Francis Poulenc's opera Dialogues of the Carmelites.
- Blanche the Manatee, a manatee who appeared as a guest in Jim Henson's Animal Show
- Blanche Von Haderach, the guardian and librarian of Level 906 ("Cygnus Archive"), from the The Backrooms, more specifically the Wikidot canon.

== See also ==
- Blanche (surname)
- Blanc
