= Blanche (surname) =

Blanche is the surname of:

- Ada Blanche (1862–1953), English actress and singer
- Al Blanche (1909–1997), American baseball pitcher
- August Blanche (1811–1868), Swedish journalist, novelist and politician
- Bartolomé Blanche (1879–1970), Chilean brigadier general and politician
- Francis Blanche (1921–1974), French actor and humorist
- Fred A. Blanche Jr. (1921–1997), American judge from Louisiana
- Gustave Maria Blanche (1849–1916), Canadian Catholic bishop
- Jacques-Émile Blanche (1861–1942), French artist
- Jean-Luc Blanche (born 1958), French serial rapist
- John Blanche (1948–2026), British illustrator
- Marguerite Blanche, Danish actress
- Margot Blanche (born 1983), French/Filipino singer and songwriter
- Robert Blanche (1962–2020), American film and television actor
- Roland Blanche (1943–1999), French actor
- Todd Blanche (born 1974), American attorney
- Vikki Blanche (born 1966/7), Australian actor and director

== See also ==
- Blanche (given name)
- Ethel La Blanche (1904–1992), American screenwriter
- Robert Blanché (1898–1975), French philosopher
