= Mary Wade (disambiguation) =

Mary Wade (1775–1859) was a British convict sent to Australia.

Mary Wade also refer to:

- Mary Belvin Wade (1951–2003), Native American (Monacan Indian Nation) community organizer and activist
- Mary Julia Wade (1928–2005), Australian palaeontologist
- Mary Hazelton Wade (1860–1936), American writer
- Jennie Wade (Mary Virginia Wade, 1843–1863), woman killed during the American Civil War
