= Francis Evrard =

French-Belgian serial rapist and pedophile

Francis Evrard (born July 12, 1946) is a French-Belgian serial rapist and pedophile, whose rise to notoriety came following his 2007 abduction, kidnapping and rape of a 5-year-old boy from his hometown of Roubaix, in Nord. His trial, held in 2009, was accompanied by debates on the treatment of sex offenders.

== Biography and criminal record ==
Evrard was born on July 12, 1946, to a modest family of laborers in Roubaix, in which he was the only child. Evrard claimed that he was sexually assaulted by a cousin at age 10, which became the cause of his later "impulses". After leaving school at the age of 12, he began committing minor thefts. His only school diploma is the certificat d'études primaires, which he obtained in prison. Evrard worked as an apprentice when he was 15–16 years old, in a school specializing in lightning equipment, but only for a few months, as he was dismissed for "lack of seriousness".

In 1962, he assaulted his first victim, for which he was sent to a recovery center in Vosges. After release, Evrard left for Belgium, where he was arrested for carrying a plumb revolver and concealing burglary material, then emptying the poor boxes of churches. In 1969, he assaulted a young boy in Mouscron, for which he was interned for 4 years in a specialized institute, before being deported from the country. Despite this, he managed to obtain dual French-Belgian nationality, and returned to settle in Belgium. In 1975, he was sentenced to 15 years' imprisonment for sexual violence against a minor, as judged by the cour d'assises of Douai in the North. He was released after 9 years, but reoffended in February 1984, and was given another 4 years. He was released after 3 years, and, yet again, reoffended as soon as he left the prison. Evrard was sentenced to 41 years' imprisonment in 1987, for the aggravated rape of two boys, aged 7 and 8.

Evrard was released from the Caen prison after 20 years, on July 2, 2007. He did not respect any of his obligations imposed by the law after the release. In total, he had eight convictions for sexual abuse of a minor, totaling 32 years in prison.

== 2007 case ==
Only six weeks after his release, Evrard abducted 5-year-old Enis K.. After approaching the boy in the street while he was playing outside his family home, Francis convinced Enis to follow him with the promises of toys. Evrard then led him to a storage unit he rented, proceeding to drug and sexually abused the child. Enis' father informed the authorities about the disappearance, and the kidnapping alert was activated. Quickly found and placed in custody, Evrard admitted his crimes, additionally confessing to a total of 40 assaults.

The man, after being released under judicial supervision, escaped any check-ups. He had to start hormone treatment for chemical castration, but on the day of his release, Evrard bought a box of Viagra from the pharmacy, with the order given by a doctor at the Caen prison before his release.

== Trial ==
A few before his trial, Evrard wrote to the then-President Nicolas Sarkozy, so he could ask that he be treated by "removal of the testicles through surgery".

Jérôme Pianezza, Evrard's lawyer, raised several damaging questions to the judicial and penitentiary authorities at the hearing: "Why have you released an offender under judicial supervision who presented a risk of reoffending? How can you prescribe Viagra so casually to a convicted pedophile?"

The lawyer believed that it could not be possible to judge Francis Evrard fairly, without also considering what had happened before the crimes themselves. He was convinced that in this case, the authorities were still hiding something.

At the hearing, Evrard described being inhabited by "impulses" from the rape he suffered at age 10. The majority of the experts described the accused as "incurable", because of his "habitual, deeply rooted pedophilic conduct".

The lead prosecutor of Douai, Luc Frémiot, who was in charge of the case, requested life imprisonment, but Evrard was instead sentenced to 30 years' imprisonment, including a 20-year mandatory prison sentence.

The trial was broadcast on France 2, on October 4, 2010, which received special permission to film.

This case helped fuel the debate on recidivism, monitoring and hormonal treatment of sex offenders in France.

The family of Enis K. announced in 2010 that they intended to sue the state, for failing to take proper care of the pedophile.

== Documentaries ==
- "Francis Evrard, the kidnapping of little Enis", in "Enter the Accused", presented by Frédérique Lantieri on October 6, 2013, on France 2.
- "Case of little Enis: kidnappy by a chronic offender" (first report) in "Chronques criminelles" on April 19 and 26, May 4, September 20 and 27, 2014, on NT1.
- "The Evrard case: 5 days to judge" in "Duty of Investigation" broadcast on June 22, 2011, on La Une (RTBF).
- "Race against death?" (first report) in "...in the North" on January 12, 19 and 27, and May 31, 2016, in "Crimes", on NRJ 12.

== See also ==
- Luc Tangorre
