= Moise Carelus =

American politician

Member-elect of the Connecticut House of Representatives from the 31st district
- Assuming office January 2027
- Succeeding: Jill Barry

Personal details
- Party: Democratic

Moise Carelus is an American politician. A member of the Democratic Party, he is the member-elect for the 31st district of the Connecticut House of Representatives.
