= Connecticut's 21st House of Representatives district =

American legislative district

Connecticut's 21st State House of Representatives district
Representative
Mike Demicco; D

Connecticut's 21st House of Representatives district elects one member of the Connecticut House of Representatives. It encompasses part of the town of Farmington. It has been represented by Democrat Mike Demicco since 2013.

== List of representatives ==
List of Representatives from Connecticut's 21st State House District
Representative	Party	Years	District home	Note
Jean Thornton	Republican	1967–1973	Glastonbury	Seat created
Edgar A. King	Republican	1973–1975	Farmington	
Thomas C. Clark	Democratic	1975–1977	Farmington	
Dorothy Barnes	Republican	1977–1983	Farmington	
William L. Wollenberg	Republican	1983–1995	Farmington	
Demetrios Giannaros	Democratic	1995–2011	Farmington	
Bill Wadsworth	Republican	2011–2013	Farmington	
Mike Demicco	Democratic	2013–	Farmington	

== Recent elections ==
=== 2020 ===
2020 Connecticut State House of Representatives election, District 21
Party	Candidate	Votes	%
Democratic	Mike Demicco (incumbent)	8,470	59.50
Republican	John W. Brockelman	5,316	36.19
Working Families	Mike Demicco (incumbent)	408	2.78
Independent Party	David Paul Kramer	224	1.53
Total votes		14,688	100.00
Democratic hold			

=== 2018 ===
2018 Connecticut State House of Representatives election, District 21
Party	Candidate	Votes	%
Democratic	Mike Demicco (incumbent)	6,613	56.4
Republican	Chris Forster	5,105	43.6
Total votes		11,718	100.00
Democratic hold			

=== 2016 ===
2016 Connecticut State House of Representatives election, District 21
Party	Candidate	Votes	%
Democratic	Mike Demicco (incumbent)	7,047	53.41
Republican	Chris Forster	6,147	46.59
Total votes		13,194	100.00
Democratic hold			

=== 2014 ===
2014 Connecticut State House of Representatives election, District 21
Party	Candidate	Votes	%
Democratic	Mike Demicco (incumbent)	5,141	53.4
Republican	John W. Brockelman	4,175	43.3
Working Families	Mike Demicco (incumbent)	317	3.3
Total votes		9,633	100.00
Democratic hold			

=== 2012 ===
2012 Connecticut State House of Representatives election, District 21
Party	Candidate	Votes	%
Democratic	Mike Demicco	6,185	51.9
Republican	Bill Wadsworth (Incumbent)	5,726	48.1
Total votes		11,911	100.00
Democratic gain from Republican			
