= Bolduc =

Bolduc is a surname. Notable people with the surname include:

- Blanche Bolduc (1906 or 1907 – 1998), Canadian folk artist
- Dan Bolduc (born 1953), American ice hockey player
- Don Bolduc (born 1962), American general and politician
- Jean-Baptiste-Zacharie Bolduc (1818–1889), Canadian Jesuit
- Joseph Bolduc (1847–1924), Canadian politician
- La Bolduc (Mary Rose-Anna Bolduc née Travers, 1894–1941), Canadian singer and musician
- Nicolas Bolduc (born 1973), cinematographer
- Roch Bolduc (born 1928), Canadian politician
- Samuel Bolduc (born 2000), Canadian ice hockey player
- Yves Bolduc (born 1957), Canadian politician and doctor
- Zachary Bolduc (born 2003), Canadian ice hockey player
