= Dorothy Barnes (disambiguation) =

Dorothy Barnes (1932–1985) is an American politician.

Dorothy Barnes may also refer to:

- Dorothy Wendy Barnes (1916–2006), British radio broadcaster
- Dorothy Gill Barnes (1927–2020), American artist
- Dorothy Barnes Pelote (1929–2015), American politician
