= Our Little Cousin =

American children's book series

Our Little Danish Cousin

Our Little Celtic Cousin of Long Ago

Our Little Cousin is a children's book series published in the United States by the L. C. Page & Company between 1901 and 1933.

An advertisement for the series in Christian Advocate said: "Let us suggest that you give your child a delightful, instructive summer trip to some foreign country and give him a chance to get acquainted with the life, habits, and customs of the children of that country." The books are written in story form for children of 9–10 years. Each book is prefaced with a brief introduction to the country and its people. By 1914 there were over 40 books in the series, eventually with at least 53 in total.

A similar series was Our Little Cousin of Long Ago authored by Evaleen Stein, Julia Darrow Cowles, and others.

== Notable contributors ==
- Mary Hazelton Wade
- Mary F. Nixon-Roulet
- Claire Winlow-Vostrovsky
