= Evaleen Stein =

American poet

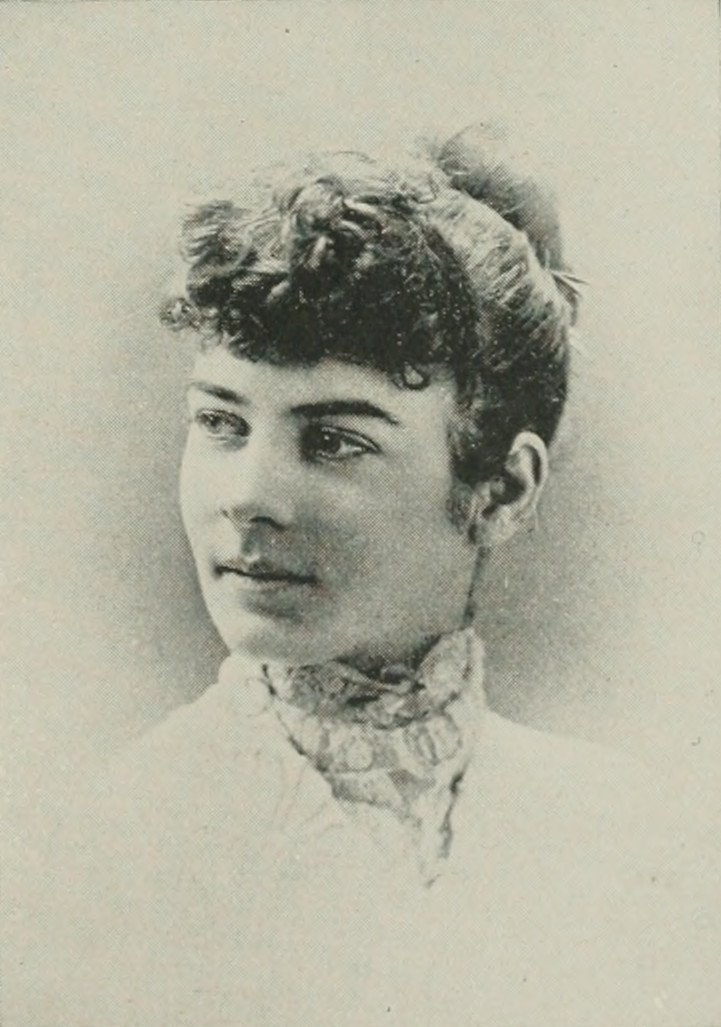
- Photo in A Woman of the Century
- Born: October 12, 1863; Lafayette, Indiana, U.S.
- Died: December 11, 1923 (aged 60); Lafayette, Indiana, U.S.
- Resting place: Greenbush Cemetery, Lafayette
- Education: Art Institute of Chicago
- Occupations: author; translator; limner
- Writing career
- Genres: poetry; prose

Evaleen Stein (October 12, 1863 – December 11, 1923) was an American writer and poet as well as a limner. She was the author of eleven volumes of stories and three books of verse. In addition, she translated two volumes of poetry, one from the Japanese (When Fairies Were Friendly) and another from Italian. An ardent lover of nature, Stein reflected this tendency in most of her poems and stories. Among her children's literature works, all written between 1903 and 1925, are Troubadour Tales, Gabriel and the Hour Book, A Little Shepherd of Provence, The Little Count of Normandy; Or, The Story of Raoul, The Christmas Porringer, Our little Norman cousin of long ago, being a story of Normandy in the time of William the Conqueror, Our Little Frankish Cousin of Long Ago, Child songs of cheer, Our Little Celtic Cousin of Long Ago, Pepin: A Tale of Twelfth Night, and Little Poems from Japanese Anthologies. She lived all her life with her mother in Lafayette, Indiana, where Stein was the center of a large circle of cultured persons.

== Early life and education ==
Evaleen Stein was born in Lafayette, Indiana, October 12, 1863, and passed her whole life in that city. The family of her father, John A. Stein, was originally from Pennsylvania, and that of her mother, Virginia Stein, came from Virginia. A brother, Orth Stein, had been widely known as a newspaper writer, fiction writer and poet, as well as a wanted criminal.

She received a liberal education and at an early age showed her poetic talents. Her father was a lawyer and a writer of verse and prose, and he directed her studies and reading so as to develop the talents which he discovered in her. Her education included the public schools of Lafayette. Her training included art, including an art course in the Art Institute of Chicago, and she won a reputation as an artist of exceptional merit.

== Career ==
=== Writer ===
Her first poem was written in 1886 and sent to the Indianapolis Journal, where it was published. For a number of years afterward, she continued to contribute poems to various newspapers, but more especially to the Indianapolis Journal.

She began to publish poems in local papers about 1887, and her work at once attracted attention by its finish and mastery of form, as well as by its spirit and sentiment. She contributed prose sketches to the local press, and was a contributor to St. Nicholas, the Boston Transcript, the Indianapolis Journal and other periodicals. Some of her poems appeared in various collections.

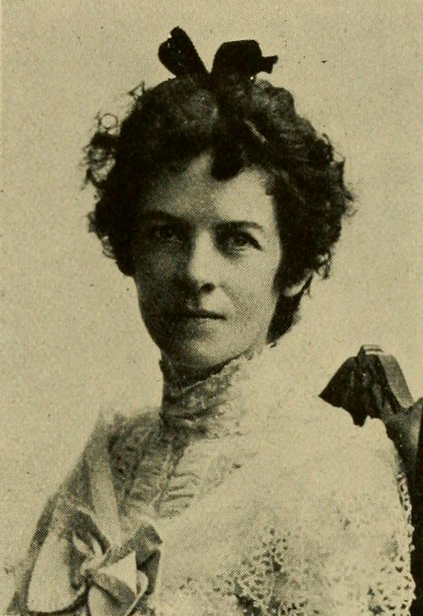
Evaleen Stein, 1908

In 1897, Copeland and Day, of Boston, brought out her first book, a small collection of poems, called One Way to the Woods, the first edition being exhausted in a few weeks. In 1898, she wrote her first short story; this with another story written the next year, appeared in St. Nicholas. These two short stories together with two longer ones, not before published, were brought out in book form in 1903 by the Bobbs-Merrill Co., of Indianapolis; the volume being called Troubadour Tales. The year before, the same company had brought out her second book of verse, called Among the Trees Again. Another book, a story for children, entitled, Gabriel and the Hour-Book, was published in 1906 by L. C. Page and Co., of Boston. Some of her poems were included in Stedman's American Anthology, and also in various other collections. She also wrote several children's books

=== Decorative arts ===
She did much decorative work for Chicago and New York City societies as an illuminator. Her most outstanding work in this line was probably an illumination of the Psalm 23, for which she received a certificate of honorable mention from the Panama–Pacific International Exposition (San Francisco, 1915). Her work in this line was exhibited by the John Herron Art Institute at Indiana University and in metropolitan exhibits.

According to White (1910), Stein's poetic art was characterized as being the most exquisite, delicately limned and evanescently outlined as a Japanese print, with an ariel-like trick of fancy. As an artist with brush and pencil, Stein was as perfect a technician as she was with her writing, her illuminated texts having a mediæval suggestion and her decorative manuscripts being pre-Raphaelitish in sentiment.

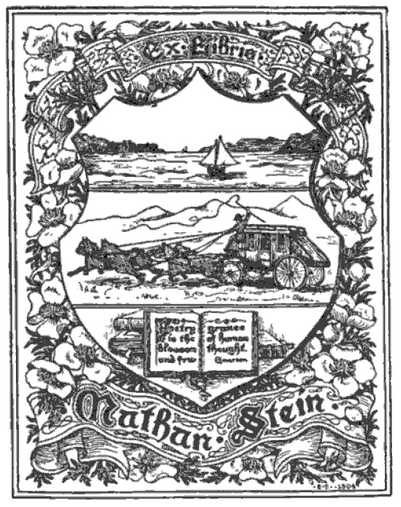
Bookplate designed by Evaleen Stein for Nathan Stein

Her bookplates -she designed four: Nathan Stein, Anne Benbridge O'Ferrall, Paul Faude, Edward Ayres- all included a flower motif, conventionalized, indicative of her ever haunting love for those expressions of natural beauty which she had woven into her verse.

== Death ==
Stein lived all her life with her mother in various homes in Lafayette, Indiana. The last of these -"the little house of dreams"- was located at 708 Hitt Street and she died there, December 11, 1923. She was interred in Lafayette's Greenbush Cemetery.

On May 23, 2024, an Indiana Historical Bureau Marker was placed at the home that Evaleen Stein shared with her mother in Lafayette, Indiana.

== Selected works ==
=== Poetry collections ===
- One Way to the Woods, 1897
- Among the Trees Again, 1902

=== Children's literature ===
- Troubadour Tales, 1903
- Gabriel and the Hour Book, 1906
- A Little Shepherd of Provence, 1910
- The Little Count of Normandy; Or, The Story of Raoul, 1911
- The Christmas Porringer, 1914
- Child songs of cheer, 1918
- Pepin: A Tale of Twelfth Night, 1924
- Little Poems from Japanese Anthologies, 1925

==== Our Little Cousin of Long Ago series ====
- Our little Norman cousin of long ago; Being a story of Normandy in the time of William the Conqueror, 1915
- Our Little Frankish Cousin of Long Ago, 1917
- Our Little Celtic Cousin of Long Ago, 1918
- Our Little Crusader Cousin of Long Ago; Being The Story of Hugo, Page to King Richard of England, in the Third Crusade, 1921

== Gallery ==
Among the trees again

Child songs of cheer

The Christmas porringer

Gabriel and the hour book

The little Count of Normandy; or, The story of Raoul

One way to the woods
Our little Celtic cousin of long ago

Our little crusader cousin of long ago

Our little Frankish cousin of long ago

Our little Norman cousin of long ago

Rosechen and the wicked magpie

Troubadour tales

When fairies were friendly
