= Olive Tyrol =

American politician (died 1951)

Member of the Connecticut House of Representatives from Glastonbury
- In office 1947–1949 Serving with N. Glenn Richards
- Preceded by: Blanche Pitney; John Lawrence
- Succeeded by: John A. Carini; Walter M. Downes

Personal details
- Born: Olive Bidwell Glastonbury, Connecticut, U.S.
- Died: April 22, 1951 Hartford, Connecticut, U.S.
- Party: Republican
- Spouse: Edward H. Tyrol
- Children: 6, including Jean Thornton

Olive Tyrol (died April 22, 1951) was an American politician who served in the Connecticut House of Representatives from 1947 to 1949, representing the town of Glastonbury as a Republican.

== Personal life ==
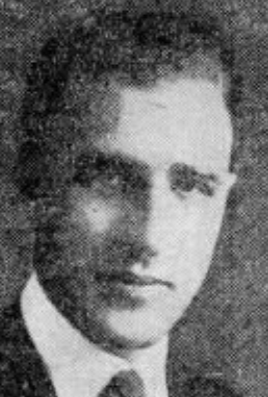
Edward H. Tyrol

Tyrol was born in Glastonbury, Connecticut, to Ambrose and Nellie Robinson Bidwell. She was married to Edward H. Tyrol, and together, they had three sons and three daughters. Among their children was politician Jean Thornton, who would later serve in the Connecticut House of Representatives. Edward, Jean, and all three sons served in World War II.

Tyrol died on April 22, 1951, at Hartford Hospital in Hartford, Connecticut.

== Political career ==
Tyrol was elected to the Connecticut House of Representatives in 1946 and served one term representing the town of Glastonbury alongside fellow Republican N. Glenn Richards. Tyrol was a member of the public health and safety and licensed occupation committees.

Tyrol was a member of the Connecticut State Women's Republican Executive Committee and the National Order of Women Legislators.
