= Luc Tangorre =

French serial rapist (born 1959)

Luc Tangorre (born 1959), known as the Marseille Southern Districts Rapist, is a French serial rapist whose crimes were highly publicized in France. He has been sentenced twice, the first time in 1983, to 15 years imprisonment for nine sexual assaults and rapes committed in Marseille.

He was partially pardoned for these acts by the then-president, François Mitterrand, in 1987. Five years later, Tangorre was convicted of raping two American students and resentenced to 18 years imprisonment. In 2019, he was sentenced to an additional to three and a half years for sexually assaulting three minors.

== First case ==
=== Rape in Marseille ===
On April 1, 1981, a 31-year-old woman named Sylviane was going home at 2 PM in the 8th arrondissement. She closed her car, took a few steps towards her home and then noticed a strange man, who immediately threatened her with a weapon and forced her to go back into the vehicle with him. Under the threat of what turns out to be a fake revolver, Sylviane entered the car and drove around the streets of Marseille with her kidnapper, stopping on a path upon request of the latter. There, the man raped her and then forced her to bring him back to the residence where, it seemed, his moped was.

Sylviane returned home and on the next day, she filed a complaint to the police station in Marseille for rape. She made a facial composite of her rapist (20–25 years old, wore white sneakers and a dark jacket), learning that she, in fact, had not been the only one to do so: between late 1979 and April 1981, nine other young women had reported being sexually assaulted in the 8th and 9th arrondissements. That same evening, another rape took place in Marseille, then another one just a week later.

=== Arrest of Luc Tangorre ===
On April 12, a patrol of Marseille peacekeepers intercepted a man matching the composite sketch drawn by Sylviane, coupled with the fact that he behaved suspiciously. They called him for an identity check: his name was Luc Tangorre, he was 22 years old, a sports student, had a Citroën 2CV, and claimed that he was waiting for a friend to come. The police searched him, and found a wrapped knife on him. He was taken to the police station for interrogation, where he spent the next night and day. Sylviane came down to the police station so she could identify him, she believed to have recognized a man on the photo montage. A dozen days later, she was presented a bunch of suspects while behind a beam splitter, Sylviane said this about Luc Tangorre: "The individual fits perfectly, I recognize him so".

The other assaulted women also come the station, and some of them formally recognized Tangorre, while others either hesitated or weren't sure. Tangorre denied everything, pointing out that he was the only aged 20 to 25, wore white tennis shoes and shorter than 1,70 cm. For him, he was framed by the police.

The police searched his home the next day, and found a dummy revolver containing some dried mud, a moped and a khaki raincoat, crowned with suspicious spots. Those spots were examined, which later proved to be petroleum jelly. Authorities then went to the edge monument of the Morgiou parking lot, where the rapist had assaulted victims Béatrice and Dominique in December 1980 and February 1981, to take samples from the ground to compare with those found on the dummy found at Tangorre's home. Moreover, one of the victims said that the attacker had brandished a revolver before raping her, and others testified that he had a small box of petroleum jelly in his pockets.

A few weeks later, the examining experts explained that the first sample taken constituted "an element of presumption of great importance", while the second differed from the comparison sample. A controversy over the choice of barium arose, as the plastic revolver itself was made of that material, with the samples the rape scene of victim Aline. Moreover, the stains on Luc's jacket turned out to have the "characteristics of petroleum jelly", and one of the victims had stated that the rapist had used "a fatty substance taken from a cosmetic box" to rape her, later stating after Tangorre's arrest that "it could be petroleum jelly". Following identification from some of the assaulted women and the evidence against him, Luc Tangorre was referred before an examining magistrate and locked up. When friends and family learned what had happened to Luc, nobody believed the accusations: everyone described him as a simple, kind and considerate man, who could never do such things. On May 13, 1982, Tangorre started a hunger strike: a support committee was made on the following day. The case became so well-publicized, that even intellectuals began to defend Luc Tangorre, including historian Pierre Vidal-Naquet, writers Marguerite Duras and Françoise Sagan, and the politicians Robert Badinter, Albin Chalandon, Jean-Claude Gaudin and Dominique Baudis.

=== First trial ===
On May 19, 1983, the trial of Luc Tangorre opened before the cour d'assises of Aix-en-Provence. His family and friends firmly believed in his acquittal, with his defense being provided by Anne and Jean Dissler, François Chevallier and Paul Lombard. Of the seventeen alleged victims of Luc Tangorre, who were assaulted between December 6, 1979 and April 10, 1981, five victims testified before the cour d'assises. Their testimonies weighed heavily, while Tangorre defended himself by presenting alibis that could be hardly be proven or emanated from his entourage: among others, on the evening that he supposedly raped Sylviane, he was hospitalized. Similarly, he claimed that he was together with friends on the evening of the other attacks.

The verdict of Luc Tangorre's trial was handed on May 24, when he was sentenced, including extenuating circumstances, to 15 years imprisonment. He, along with his entourage, all cried to the scandal of a miscarriage of justice. A large part of the press was not convinced either: a large daily in Marseille explained in one of its columns: "after the verdict was dissected, reviewed and corrected by the defense, we could not see any more truth sufficient to justify a conviction".

=== Incarceration and presidential pardon ===
Between December 1984 and February 1988, Tangorre was incarcerated at the Muret detention center, where, with the help of his parents, he attempted to get a retrial. The request for review was based on counter-expertise from across the country, which called into question the conclusions of the first examiners. Rumors circulated: his family financed this counter-expertise, and his brother gave a later testimony to justify the traces of the product that had "the characteristics of petroleum jelly", when a witness had largely explained the origin of these lipid spots observed on the raincoat from the beginning of the inspection. These observations annihilated the conclusions of the previous examiners because of "serious methodological errors". On July 21, 1987, after the rejection of an appeal in cassation, Tangorre obtained a presidential pardon from François Mitterrand, but only a partial one, which reduced his sentence to four years.

On February 15, 1988, after serving almost seven years in detention, Luc Tangorre obtained parole through Albin Chalandon. A cohort of journalists were present during his exit, during which he made a statement signifying the continuation of his fight. After that, he moved to Lyon, where he opened a tobacco shop.

== Recidivism ==
=== Rape of two American students ===
Coming from Paris so they could hitchhike on the Côte d'Azur for the weekend of May 21 and 22, 1988, 20-year-old Jennifer Mac Luney and 21-year-old Carol Ackermann, American students in Paris, went to Marseille at first, before moving to a beach in Les Sablettes in La Seyne-sur-Mer. On May 23, they hitchhiked again to return to the capital, where they were taking advanced French courses in an American college. They were standing at the outskirts of Marseille when a man driving Renault 4, aged 30, with brown hair and a friendly demeanor, offered to bring them to Lyon. Shortly before Nîmes, the man claimed that he wanted to go pick cherries, so he deviated from the main route and stopped his apple-green 4L in an isolated cherry plantation, located about three kilometers from Nîmes. There, under the threat of a weapon, he raped them for a long time, sodomizing them with engine oil to make things easier. He then abandoned the girls, without giving them a hundred francs to take a taxi, because "the roads are not safe". After walking through the fields for 35 minutes, they found a highway terminal, where they called the police, reporting that they had been raped.

=== Investigation ===
When the police questioned the American students, they revealed that they had an excellent memory: they accurately described the green 4L (license plate, a missing handle, the gas gauge not working) in which they were violated, the physique of the individual (in his 30s, wearing a yellow Lacoste polo shirt, a signet ring, white jeans and gray/black sneakers). In addition, they said that there was a pile of books in the trunk of the 4L, on which there were the words 'guilt' or 'guilty' and the face of a mustachioed man on the cover page; also, when the perpetrator saw the girls looking at the books, he quickly covered the pile with a blanket before raping them.

The young women helped make a composite sketch of the man. Constable Alain Derbecq requisitioned the gynecological doctor of the Caremau Hospital in Nîmes, whom concluded: for Mac Luney, "in total, the interrogation and the clinical examination are suggestive of rape with a rectal radio, although there are no traumatic lesions at the vulvar or the anal level", and for Ackermann "according to what the patient said, and according to the clinical examination, although there was no trauma, it may be thought that there was a rectal radio of force." Doctors also noted the presence of "a greasy coating, probably oil" on Ackermann; no such observation was noted on Mac Luney, which they specified that the man "probably used engine oil". The next day, the examinations of the samples taken immediately after the rape highlighted the following: for Mac Luney, "spermatozoon in a relatively small proportion, most of which do not have flagellum" and for Ackermann, "very rare, small ovoid corpuscles without flagellum that may correspond to spermatozoon heads."

The police also searched for a book whose title contained the word 'guilt'. They also composed a list of all owners of green Renaults 4L and, in August 1988, a bookseller from Marseille called the police of Nîmes, telling them that he had found a book that matched the one they were looking for: it was written by a CNRS biologist (Gisèle Tichané, a friend of the Tangorre family) titled Guilty at any price: the Luc Tangorre case, which also had the face of a mustachioed man at the bottom of the cover page.

The gendarmes again became interested in Luc Tangorre, learning that he lived in Lyon, where he ran a tobacco shop on the Place Carnot, on Marigny, bought after his release with the help of his parents. Their investigation determined that he had a green Renault 4L. On letters of rogatory, Christian Lernould, investigating judge at the court of Nîmes, ordered the gendarmes to bring in Tangorre for questioning on October 24. When arrested by the gendarmerie at Lyon, he shouted out his innocence when the police informed him that he was accused of two rapes. Luc claimed on the day of the rapes it was Pentecost, and that he was at his parents' house for a family dinner after a baptism; he apparently remembered it very well, because it was the first family party since his release. He then said that he slept at his parents' house and noted his activities in his notebook, an alibi backed by his family and friends. To prove his innocence, Tangorre's parents even gave the police photos of the baptism: to their stupefaction, in the photos, Luc was wearing jeans, the yellow Lacoste polo shirt and the gray/black sneakers, as described by the two girls.

The police made the trip to Marseille-Nîmes to find out if Luc Tangorre could have the necessary time to violate the two students. Modeled on the fluctuating declarations of the Americans, no less than four thirty-month retrospective trajectory trials were necessary to be conducted, taking into account the claims by the girls. It was concluded that Tangorre could have had the material time to carry out this course to violate them, even if, at the end of the third trial, the magistrates at the cour d'assises of Montpellier recognized the fact that "contradictions as they appear in the story of the initial journey, as described by the victims". Tangorre's five lawyers challenged the honesty of the fourth trial, and gave reasons in writing as to why they refused to participate. Finally, it was noted that the crime scene was a place where Luc came to play as a child, 2.5 km away from the "Daffodils" building in Nîmes, his former place of residence, as discovered by the original 1981 investigation..

As soon as he was arrested, Tangorre asked the gendarmes and the judge for a genetic comparison based on the samples, as quickly as possible. Nevertheless, the evidence taken from both Mac Luney and Ackermann, which should logically exonerate Tangorre if tampered with or simply fixed, was rare and altered, which destroys all possibility of exploitation.

Luc Tangorre was brought before the examining magistrate, while the two girls made the express trip from the United States to identify him. Once there, he insulted both victims after they formally identified him as their rapist. However, the claims about the rear seats of the green 4L on which the girls were raped were unusable, along with the claim that the gas tank had run 40 km as described by the accusers (it was not conclusively proven after the investigation), which weakened the credibility of the accusations. Tangorre argued that it was impossible to remain a virgin after the type of rape Ackermann had suffered, and that Mac Luney could not reasonably explain by what miracle she could, eight weeks after the fact, reproduce from memory the design of the jacket after her traumatic condition, with precision comparable to that of tracing. He also raised the following point: if there were only 35 minutes to reach the only possible passage to the motorway by the route starting from their very precise indications, all on the basis of a nocturnal labyrinth (various obstacles, barbed wire or entangled vegetables), this was precisely the shortest and most direct path: it would still be a miracle, and once again, this question was posed by Luc Tangorre's defenders.

However, he was incarcerated and imprisoned at the Nîmes prison, and when his supporters, most of whom had been with him since his first trial, learned about his possible involvement in the Nîmes rapes, a part of them began wondering who was responsible for raping the nine young women in Marseille. In addition, Pierre Vidal-Naquet, who believed in his innocence in the first instance, said that if it turns out that Tangorre is guilty, he would publicly apologize.

Before passing to the cour d'assises, the public prosecutor's office and Tangorre's lawyers solicited confrontations that they never got. As for Luc, he denounced in vain a fictitious accusation, intended to artificially ruin the efforts which previously lead to the review of the first trial.

=== Second trial ===
The second trial of Luc Tangorre began on February 3, 1992, before the cour d'assises of Gard and Nîmes, under presiding Justice Maurice Malleval. As in the first trial at Aix-en-Provence, Tangorre cried out that this was a scandal. At the request of both victims, the trial was held in private.

Besides his parents, fewer people still believed in his innocence. Like in the first trial, Tangorre defended himself viciously, but Ackermann and Mac Luney's testimony weighed heavily on the balance, after they claimed and confirmed that it was indeed Luc Tangorre who had raped them. The latter repeated that he would've done such thing. The psychiatric experts stated, in the event of his guilt, that it could be a case of dissociative personality disorder and that the "normal" Luc Tangorre could not admit he was forced to refer himself to under the hypothesis.

The verdict of the second trial was announced on February 8, and Luc Tangorre was sentenced, with extenuating circumstances, to 18 years imprisonment. His parents, once again, screamed for scandal and miscarriage of justice.

Following the verdict, Vidal-Naquet apologized in a column published in Le Monde, recognizing that without the intervention of the support committee, Tangorre would not have been pardoned and the rapes of the two Americans would've never occurred.

This time, Tangorre was not released on parole. He only got two permissions granted within four months, before his release on September 1, 2000.

== New offences ==
Domiciled in the Lyon area, since his release from prison in 2000, Luc Tangorre became the talk of the town again on August 12, 2014, when he was indicted in Grau-du-Roi, on suspicion of sexually assaulting a 12-year-old girl. The case experienced ramifications, as two other minors joined in the indictment, bringing the total number to three assaults in Gard. Luc Tangorre was left free, with a travel ban on Gard, although the Nîmes Procurate required that he be placed in provisional custody.

In December 2017, Tangorre was indicted again, this time for corrupting a minor in Saint-Martin-en-Haut, in Rhône. He was placed, eight months later, under judicial control.

On September 12, 2019, the Nîmes Correctional Tribunal sentenced Luc Tangorre to three and a half years for sexually assaulting three minors between July 1, 2012 and July 19, 2019. His civil and civic rights were withdrawn for a period of five years, and after he was convicted of rape six times, he continues to proclaim himself a victim of a miscarriage of justice.

Finally, contrary to what his lawyers suggested, he will appeal this decision. Luc Tangorre will soon appear in a Lyon court for similar events, denounced in 2018 by another teenager near Lyon.

== See also ==
=== Connected articles ===
- Jean-Luc Blanche

=== Mediagraphy ===
- Gallot, Didier (1993). The graces of God: the scandal of the presidential pardons. Paris: Albin Michel. p. 209. ISBN 9782226064936. OCLC 463772520.

==== Documentaries ====
- Luc Tangorre, innocent at all costs, presented by Christophe Hondelatte in "Enter the Accused", released in March 2008 and May 2009, on France 2.
- Not guilty or predator?, in "Crimes", "Special: he appealed to the President" (first report), on February 13, 2017, on NRJ 12.
