= Jean Thornton =

American politician (died 1980)

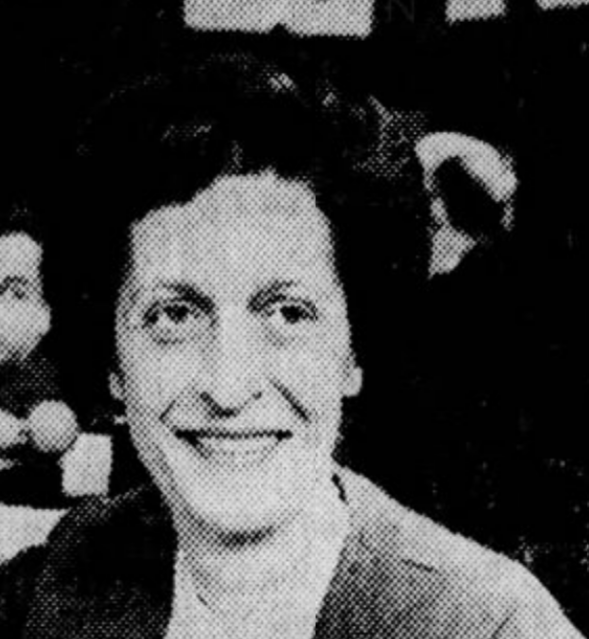

Member of the Connecticut House of Representatives from Glastonbury
- In office 1963–1967 Serving with Homer Scoville
- Preceded by: Homer Scoville; William F. Connery
- Succeeded by: Seat eliminated

Member of the Connecticut House of Representatives from the 21st district
- In office 1967–1973
- Preceded by: Seat established
- Succeeded by: Edgar A. King

Member of the Connecticut House of Representatives from the 31st district
- In office 1973–1977
- Preceded by: Leon F. Hermanowski
- Succeeded by: Antonina Parker

Personal details
- Born: Jean Tyrol; 1921 or 1922 Glastonbury, Connecticut, U.S.
- Died: February 17, 1980 (aged 58) Glastonbury, Connecticut, U.S.
- Party: Republican
- Children: 3
- Parent(s): Olive Tyrol; Edward H. Tyrol

Military service
- Branch/service: Women's Army Corps
- Rank: First lieutenant

Jean Thornton (née Tyrol; 1921 or 1922 – February 17, 1980) was an American politician who served in the Connecticut House of Representatives as a Republican. From 1963 to 1967, she represented the town of Glastonbury; from 1967 to 1973, the 21st district; and from 1973 to 1977, the 31st district.

== Personal life ==
Thornton was born in Glastonbury, Connecticut, one of six children born to Edward H. Tyrol, a sergeant in the U.S. Army, and Olive Tyrol, a politician who represented Glastonbury in the Connecticut House of Representatives. Thornton, her father, and her three brothers all served in the U.S. Army during World War II.

Thornton served in the Women's Army Corps in Florida, Iowa, Mississippi, and Oklahoma as a first lieutenant. She met her husband while in Oklahoma, and together, the couple had three children.

== Political career ==
A Republican, Thornton was first elected to the Connecticut House of Representatives in 1962 as one of two representatives from the town of Glastonbury. Though only formally elected to a single two-year term, Thornton remained in her seat until 1967 due to Connecticut's 1964 redistricting attempts. Following the landmark court decision Butterworth v. Dempsey, Connecticut's apportionment was ruled unconstitutional, and the state was federally mandated to eliminate its single-town electoral districts. When the General Assembly failed to redistrict in time, Connecticut was ordered to cancel its 1964 House election, and the legislature elected in 1962 was ultimately held over until 1967 due to a lengthy impasse.

In 1966, Connecticut was successfully redistricted, and Thornton was unanimously chosen as the Republican nominee for the newly created 21st district. She was elected and served three terms.

In 1972, following another redistricting, Thornton was elected to the 31st district, where she served two more terms. She did not run for reelection in 1976 and was succeeded by fellow Republican Antonina Parker.

=== Political positions and legislation ===
Thornton was a supporter of U.S. Senator Barry Goldwater's 1964 presidential campaign and was a staff member at the campaign's Connecticut headquarters.

Thornton authored a bill in support of expanding abortion rights in Connecticut, which then only permitted abortion to save the life of the mother, to allow abortion in cases where "the physical and mental health of the mother are endangered", as well as in cases of rape or incest. The bill failed in the House of Representatives in June 1967, defeated in a 73-59 vote.

Thornton authored a "right to work" bill that would make it illegal to discriminate in hiring due to a candidate's union or non-union status.

== Death ==
Thornton died at her home in Glastonbury, Connecticut, on February 17, 1980. She was 58.
