= Jill Barry =

American politician (born 1973)

Member of the Connecticut House of Representatives from the 31st district
- Incumbent
- Assumed office January 9, 2019
- Preceded by: Prasad Srinivasan
- Succeeded by: Moise Carelus (elect)

Personal details
- Born: November 12, 1973 (age 53)
- Party: Democratic
- Spouse: Shawn Barry
- Education: University of Connecticut

Jill Barry (born November 12, 1973) is an American politician who has represented the 31st district in the Connecticut House of Representatives since 2019. She has served as the deputy majority whip at-large since 2025.

Barry was previously assistant majority leader from 2019 to 2022 and assistant majority whip from 2023 to 2024. She is considered to be one of the most conservative Democrats in the state legislature.

== Political career ==
Barry started her political career as a member of the Glastonbury Town Council, where she served from 2011 to 2018. She spearheaded the "tobacco free parks" program in Glastonbury, which passed in 2017.

=== General assembly ===
Barry was elected in the general election to the Connecticut General Assembly on November 6, 2018, defeating Republican candidate Lillian Tanski. She was re-elected in 2020, 2022, and 2024. While running for re-election in 2026, Barry lost re-nomination at a local convention to Moise Carelus. Following the loss, she chose not to run in the Democratic primary, instead seeking re-election on the Republican and Independent party lines.

== Electoral history ==
=== 2018 ===
2018 Connecticut's 31st House of Representatives district election
Party	Candidate	Votes	%
Democratic	Jill Barry	6,540	50.4
Republican	Lillian Tanski	6,435	49.6
Total votes		12,975	100
Democratic gain from Republican			

=== 2020 ===
2020 Connecticut's 31st House of Representatives district election
Party	Candidate	Votes	%
Democratic	Jill Barry (incumbent)	8,521	53.0
Republican	Stewart Beckett	7,107	44.2
Independent Party	Stewart Beckett	445	2.8
Total	Stewart Beckett	7,552	47.0
Total votes		16,073	100.0
Democratic hold			

=== 2022 ===
2022 Connecticut's 31st House of Representatives district election
Party	Candidate	Votes	%
Democratic	Jill Barry	6,882	60.4
Independent Party	Jill Barry	213	1.9
Total	Jill Barry (incumbent)	7,095	62.3
Republican	Gary Giannelli	4,304	37.7
Total votes		11,399	100.0
Democratic hold			

=== 2024 ===
2024 Connecticut's 31st House of Representatives district election
Party	Candidate	Votes	%
Democratic	Jill Barry	9,367	88.6
Independent Party	Jill Barry	1,209	11.4
Total	Jill Barry (incumbent)	10,576	100.0
Total votes		10,576	100.0
