= Sonya Googins =

American politician (born 1936)

Member of the Connecticut House of Representatives from the 31st district
- In office 1995–2007
- Preceded by: Robert D. Bowden
- Succeeded by: Thomas J. Kehoe

Personal details
- Born: November 9, 1936 (age 89) New Haven, Connecticut, U.S.
- Party: Republican
- Spouse: Robert Googins
- Children: 2
- Education: University of Connecticut (B.A.)

Sonya "Sonny" Googins (born November 9, 1936) is an American politician who served in the Connecticut House of Representatives from 1995 to 2007, representing the 31st district as a Republican.
