= Mike Demicco =

American politician (born 1958)

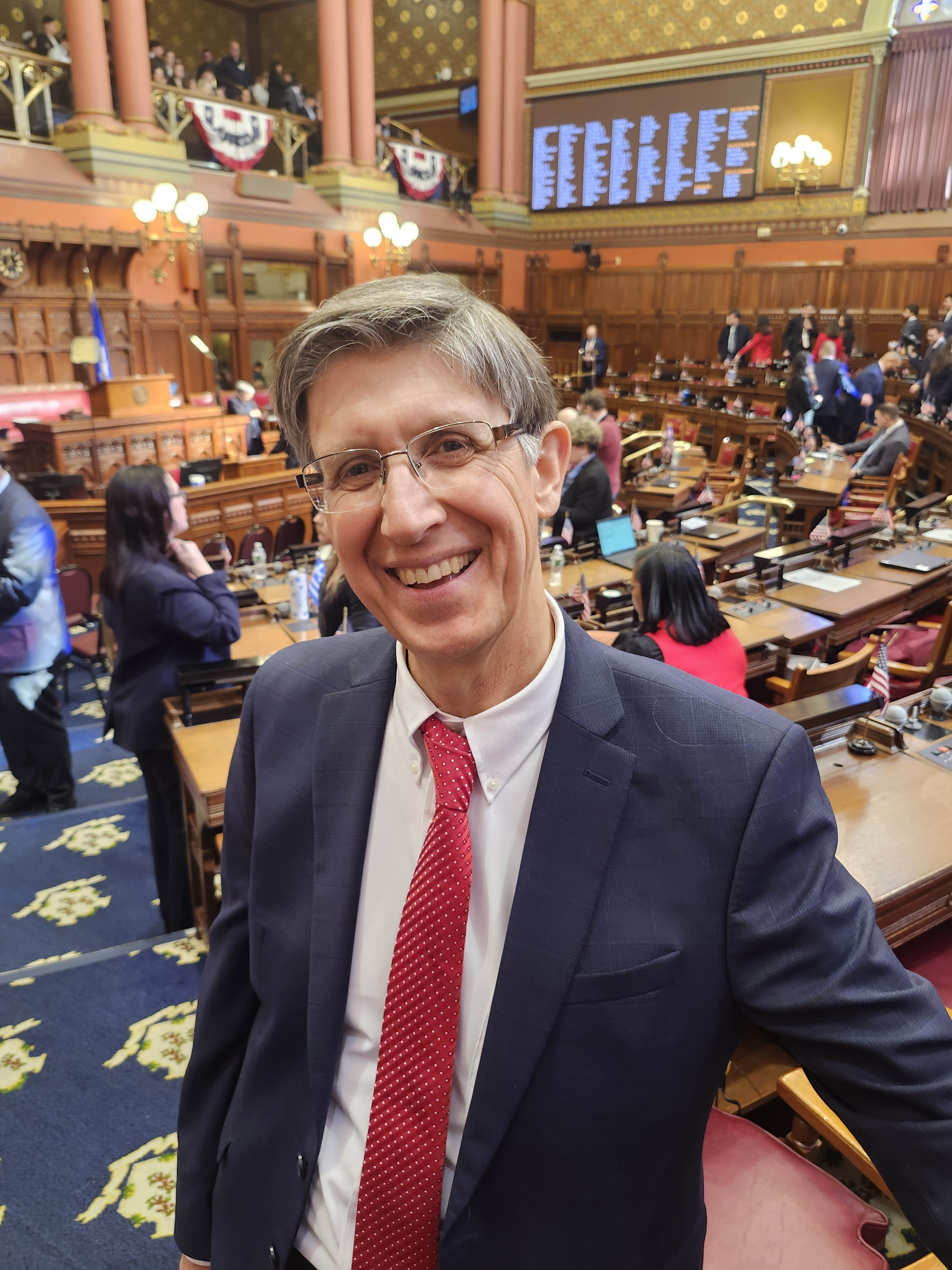

Member of the Connecticut House of Representatives from the 21st district
- Incumbent
- Assumed office January 9, 2013
- Preceded by: Bill Wadsworth

Personal details
- Born: November 1, 1958 (age 67) Norwich, Connecticut, U.S.
- Party: Democratic
- Education: Wesleyan University (BA)

Mike Demicco (born November 1, 1958) is an American politician who has served in the Connecticut House of Representatives from the 21st district since 2013.
