= Julia Darrow Cowles =

American children's book writer and storyteller

Our little Athenian cousin of Long Ago

Julia Darrow Cowles (January 6, 1862 – September 6, 1919) was an American children's book writer and storyteller.

She was born in Norwalk, Ohio, to a family of Frank V. Darrow, one of the firm of Darrow Bros in Norwalk. She was a granddaughter of Rev. Allan Darrow who was a Baptist minister in Ohio and one of the founders of Denison University. She received her education in the Central High School of Buffalo, New York. In addition to books, she has also been a contributor to The Youth's Companion, St. Nicholas, and other juvenile publications.

On October 16, 1883, she married Francis Dana Cowles in Minneapolis, Minnesota.

== Books ==
- Jim Crow's language lessons and other stories of birds and animals 1903
- The Robinson Crusoe Reader 1906
- Stories to tell, including stories for reproduction and dramatization in the school room 1906
- HE ART OF STORY-TELLING 1914
- Favorite Fairy Tales Retold 1915
- Going to school in animal land 1917
- Indian Nature Myths 1918
- Myths from many lands, 1924

=== Our Little Cousin of Long Ago series ===
- Our Little Athenian Cousin of Long Ago
- Our Little Carthaginian Cousin of Long Ago
- Our Little Macedonian Cousin of Long Ago
- Our Little Roman Cousin of Long Ago
- Our Little Spartan Cousin of Long Ago
