= Blanche McManus =

American writer and artist

- Born: 1869; East Feliciana Parish, Louisiana, United States
- Died: 1935 (aged 65–66)
- Occupations: Illustrator, writer
- Spouse: Francis Miltoun

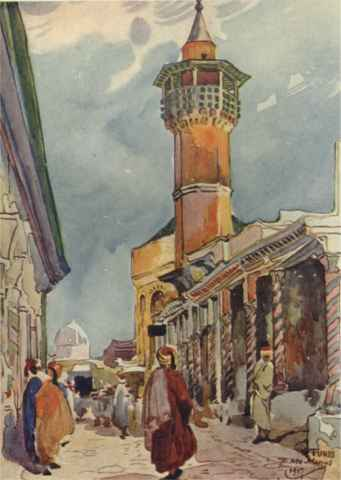
Street of Mosques, Tunis, 1908

Blanche McManus (1869–1935) was an American writer and artist. She and her husband, Milburg Francisco Mansfield wrote a series of illustrated travel books, many of which included information about automobiles which were new at the time.

== Biography ==
McManus was born on Talledega Plantation, East Feliciana Parish, Louisiana, in 1870 and died in Louisiana on June 13, 1935.

McManus inherited Hampton Hall, a historic mansion in Woodville, Mississippi, with her two sisters in 1909. She did the murals in the parlor.

== Collections ==
Her work is included in the collection of the Smithsonian American Art Museum.

== Books written/illustrated ==
Many of these books may have only been cover design illustrations by Blanche McManus.

Date	Author	Title	Publisher
1896	Maria Louise Pool	Boss and Other Dogs	Chicago: Stone and Kimball
1896	Ian Maclaren	Kate Carnegie	Dodd, Mead
1896	Charles Gibbon	Margaret Carmichael	New Amsterdam Book Co.
1896	Blanche McManus	The True Mother Goose.	Boston: Lamson Wolffe & Co.
1897	Rudyard Kipling	Recessional	NY: M. F. Mansfield & A. Wessels
1897	Richard Mansfield	Blown Away	Boston: L. C. Page & Co.
1897	Isaac Watts	Childhood's Songs of Long Ago	NY: E. R. Herrick
1897	Emily D. Elton	A Mince Pie Dream: A Book of Children's Verse	NY: E. R. Herrick & Co.
1897	Blanche McManus	The Voyage of the Mayflower	NY: E. R. Herrick & Co.
1897	Blanche McManus	How the Dutch Came to Manhattan	NY: E. R. Herrick & Co.
1898	Tom Hall	When Cupid Calls	NY: E. R. Herrick & Co.
1898	G. A. Henty	Henty Series	Boston: L. C. Page & Co.
1898	Alfred Lord Tennyson	Crossing the Bar	NY: E. R. Herrick & Co.
1898	Blanche McManus	Told in the Twilight: Stories to Tell Children	NY: E. R. Herrick & Co.
1898	Rudyard Kipling	Mandalay	NY: M. F. Mansfield & Co.
1898	Blanche McManus	Bachelor Ballads	NY: New Amsterdam Book Co.
1898	Walter Mapes	A Canticle of Wine, or the Drinking Song of Walter D. Mapes	NY: M. F. Mansfield & Co.
1899	Ruth McEnery Stuart	Holly and Pizen	The Century Co.
1899	Lewis Carroll	Alice's Adventures in Wonderland	NY: M. F. Mansfield & A. Wessels
1899	Rudyard Kipling	The Betrothed	NY: M. F. Mansfield & A. Wessels
1899	Blanche McManus	The Quaker Colony	NY: E. R. Herrick & Co.
1900	Alfred Lord Tennyson	"In Memoriam"	London: The Bankside Press
1900	Lewis Carroll	Alice's Adventures in Wonderland & Through the Looking Glass	NY: A. Wessels Company
1903	Francis Miltoun	The Cathedrals of Northern France	Boston: L. C. Page & Co.
1904	G. Sidney Paternoster	The Motor Pirate	Boston: L. C. Page & Co.
1904	Blanche McManus	The 'Sov'rane Herb' and the Smokers Year, a Calendar for MDCCCCIIII	Boston: L. C. Page & Co.
1904	M.F. and Blanche McManus Mansfield	Romantic Ireland	Boston: L. C. Page & Co.
1904	Francis Miltoun	Cathedrals of Southern France	Boston: L. C. Page & Co.
1905	Henry C. Shelley	The Spell of Old Paris	Boston: L. C. Page & Co.
1905	Charles Rudy	The Cathedrals of Northern Spain	Boston: L. C. Page & Co.
1905	Francis Miltoun	Rambles in Brittany	Boston: L. C. Page & Co.
1905	Francis Miltoun	Rambles in Normandy	Boston: L. C. Page & Co.
1905	Blanche McManus	Our Little English Cousin	Boston: L. C. Page & Co.
1905	Blanche McManus	Our Little French Cousin	Boston: L. C. Page & Co.
1905	Francis Miltoun	Cathedrals and Churches of the Rhine	Boston: L. C. Page & Co.
1906	Nathaniel Hawthorne	In Colonial Days	Boston: L. C. Page & Co.
1906	Francis Miltoun	Castles and Chateaux of Touraine and the Loire Country	Boston: L. C. Page & Co.
1906	Francis Miltoun	Rambles on the Riviera	Boston: L. C. Page & Co.
1906	Blanche McManus	Our Little Scotch Cousin	Boston: L. C. Page & Co.
1906	Mary F. Nixon-Roulet	Our Little Dutch Cousin	Boston: L. C. Page & Co.
1906	Mary F. Nixon-Roulet	Fernando, Our Little Spanish Cousin	Boston: L. C. Page & Co.
1907	Charles Dickens	The Seven Poor Travelers	The Century Co.
1907	Francis Miltoun	The Automobilist Abroad	Boston: L. C. Page & Co.
1907	Francis Miltoun	Castles and Chateaux of Old Navarre and the Basque Provinces	Boston: L. C. Page & Co.
1907	Blanche McManus	Our Little Hindu Cousin	Boston: L. C. Page & Co.
1907	Blanche McManus	Our Little Arabian Cousin	Boston: L. C. Page & Co.
1906	Mary F. Nixon-Roulet	Our Little Alaskan Cousin	Boston: L. C. Page & Co.
1908	Mary Caroline Crawford	Old Boston in Colonial Days	Boston: L. C. Page & Co.
1908	Francis Miltoun	In the Land of Mosques and Minerets	Boston: L. C. Page & Co.
1908	Francis Miltoun	The Spell of Algeria and Tunisia	Boston: L. C. Page & Co.
1908	Blanche McManus	Our Little Egyptian Cousin	Boston: L. C. Page & Co.
1909	Henry C. Shelley	Inns and Taverns of Old London	Boston: L. C. Page & Co.
1909	Francis Miltoun	Italian Highways and Byways from a Motor Car	Boston: L. C. Page & Co.
1909	Francis Miltoun	Castles and Chateaux of Old Burgundy & the Border Provinces	Boston: L. C. Page & Co.
1910	Francis Miltoun	Royal Palaces and Parks of France	Boston: L. C. Page & Co.
1911	Blanche McManus	Our Little Belgian Cousin	Boston: L. C. Page & Co.
1911	Blanche McManus	The American Woman Abroad	NY: Dodd, Mead
1912	Blanche McManus	Mother Goose Nursery Rhymes: Children's Favorite Rhymes & Jingles	NY: The Platt & Peck Co.
1925	Francis Miltoun	The Spell of Normandy	Boston: L. C. Page & Co.
1927	Francis Miltoun	The Spell of Brittany	Boston: L. C. Page & Co.
