= Bill Wadsworth =

American politician (born 1952)

Member of the Connecticut House of Representatives from the 21st district
- In office January 5, 2011 – January 9, 2013
- Preceded by: Demetrios Giannaros
- Succeeded by: Mike Demicco

Personal details
- Born: November 8, 1952 (age 73)
- Party: Republican

Bill Wadsworth (born November 8, 1952) is an American politician who served in the Connecticut House of Representatives from the 21st district from 2011 to 2013.
