= Cecil Carstenson =

American sculptor (1906–1991)

- Born: July 23, 1906; Marquette, Kansas, U.S.
- Died: January 3, 1991 (aged 84); Kansas City, Missouri, U.S.
- Education: Kansas City Art Institute, Omaha Art School
- Occupation: Sculptor
- Known for: Wood sculpture
- Spouse: Blanche Carstenson

Cecil Carstenson (1906–1991) was an American sculptor. He was born in Marquette, Kansas, and lived in Kansas City most of his life. He was a sculptor for 50 years, working exclusively in wood for the last 40 years of his life. His work has been displayed in more than 25 museums, colleges and public buildings, including the Nelson-Atkins Museum of Art; the Phoenix Museum; the Museum of Nebraska Art; the Josyln Museum in Omaha, Nebraska; the University of Missouri-Kansas City; St. Benedict's College in Atchison, Kansas; the Birger Sandzen Gallery of Art in Lindsborg, Kansas; the Missouri State Historical Museum; the Kansas City Art Institute; and the Wichita Museum of Art. He exhibited sculptures in the Missouri Pavilion at the 1964 World's Fair in New York.

Mr. Carstenson formerly taught sculpture at the University of Kansas City and conducted sculpture workshops at other colleges. He was past president of the Mid-America Artists Association and of the local chapter of the Artists Equity Association. He wrote the book Craft and Creation of Wood Sculpture. He attended the Kansas City Art Institute and the Omaha Art School, and studied with sculptors in the United States and Italy. He was a member of the Friends of Art, the Kansas City Art Institute alumni association, the Friends of UMKC Library and the Kansas City Artists Coalition. He had worked for Western Electric Co. for 36 years and retired as a shop superintendent in 1962. He had attended Finlay Engineering College.

He was a lieutenant colonel in the Army Air Forces in World War II and received the Legion of Merit and an air medal with three clusters.
