= Prasad Srinivasan =

American politician

Member of the Connecticut House of Representatives from the 31st district
- In office January 5, 2011 – January 2019
- Preceded by: Thomas Kehoe (D)
- Succeeded by: Jill Barry (D)

Personal details
- Born: November 19, 1949 (age 76) India
- Party: Republican
- Spouse: Kala Prasad
- Children: Sashank Prasad, Anusha Prasad-Rodriguez
- Education: University of Baroda (MD)
- Website: House website

Prasad Srinivasan (born November 19, 1949) is a physician and Republican politician who represented the town of Glastonbury in the Connecticut House of Representatives from 2011 to 2019.

== Medical education and career ==
Srinivasan was born in Kerala, India into a Tamil family. He graduated from Baroda Medical College. He immigrated to the United States in 1975 and did his fellowship in allergy and immunology at Michael Reese Hospital in Chicago. He was chief pediatric resident at Brookdale Hospital in Brooklyn, NY. He is certified by the American Board of Pediatrics and the American Board of Allergy and Immunology. Srinavasan is an allergist in Glastonbury, Connecticut, treating both pediatric and adult patients.

== Political career ==
Srinivasan was first elected to the 31st district of the Connecticut House of Representatives in 2010, defeating incumbent Democrat Thomas Kehoe with 56% of the vote. He won reelection in 2012 against Chip Flanagan with 60% of the vote, in 2014 without any challenger, and in 2016 against Democrat Matt Saunig with 68% of the vote. He did not run for reelection in 2018. Srinivasan served on the Health Committee, the Environment Committee, and as one of the few non-lawyers, on the Judiciary Committee.

Srinivasan was a candidate for the Republican nomination for governor of Connecticut in 2018.

== Political views ==
=== Families and children ===
In 2017, Srinivasan introduced House Bill 6645, to establish parental access equality in cases involving the custody of a minor child, but the bill died in the judiciary committee. In 2018, Srinivasan was one of only three members of the Judiciary Committee voting against the reconfirmation of the controversial family court judge Jane B. Emons, who was not reconfirmed despite the positive committee vote.

=== Housing ===
In 2017, Srinivasan proposed legislation to address the problem with failing concrete foundations, but the bill died in the Joint Committee on Planning and Development.

=== Taxes ===
Srinivasan has sponsored legislation to create tax credits for renewable energy, to eliminate the business entity tax, and to phase out the corporation business tax at a rate of one per cent per year.

== Awards and honors ==
Srinivasan received the 2013 "Legislator of the Year" Award from the Connecticut chapter of the American College of Surgeons, and the Ellis Island Medal of Honor. He was one of 18 Indian Americans who was given a Hind Ratan Award from the President of India in 2008.
