= Claire Winlow-Vostrovsky =

Czech-American educator, author, and translator

- Klára Winlow-Vostrovská
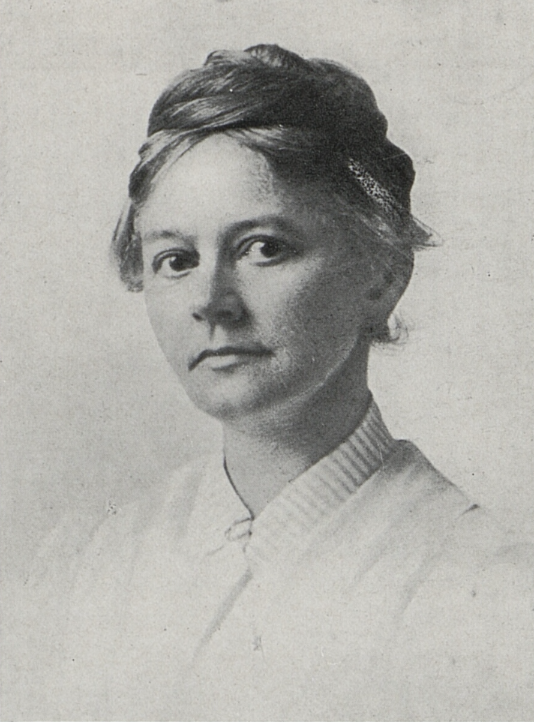
- Winlow in 1920
- Born: October 27, 1871; West Point, Nebraska, United States
- Died: Chico, California, United States
- Citizenship: United States
- Education: Stanford University (graduated 1895)
- Alma mater: Stanford University
- Occupations: Author, educator, librarian, translator, journalist
- Years active: 1930s

Claire Winlow-Vostrovsky (Czech: Klára Winlow-Vostrovská; October 27, 1871 – March 5, 1963) was a Czech-American author, educator, librarian, and advocate for Czech culture in the United States. She wrote children's books in the Our Little Cousin series, introducing young American readers to various European cultures, including those of Bohemia, Finland, Romania, and others. Winlow was recognized as the first Czech-American woman to earn a university degree and actively promoted Czech history and literature through lectures and translations.

== Early life and education ==
Winlow was born on October 27, 1871, in West Point, Nebraska, to Czech immigrant parents Jaroslav (Jerome) Vostrovský (1836–1901), originally from eastern Bohemia, and Anna Vostrovská (1839–1922). She grew up in a Czech family alongside her older sister Anna, who later married Czech-American historian Tomáš Čapek, and younger brother Jeremy. The family relocated several times before settling in San Jose, California, in 1883, where her father's home became a center for local Czech expatriate life.

Winlow attended Stanford University in the early 1890s and graduated in 1895, becoming the first Czech-American woman to achieve a university education.

== Career ==
After graduation, Winlow taught at high schools in northern California. In the early 20th century, she moved to southern California and was appointed head of the foreign language department at the Los Angeles Public Library, overseeing publications in languages of immigrant communities, including Czech. During and after World War I, she promoted Czech traditions in Los Angeles as a member of organizations such as the Southern California Press Club, Story Tellers’ League, and Ruskin Art Club, giving lectures on Czech history, culture, and literature.

== Literary works ==
Winlow authored several books in the "Our Little Cousin" series, aimed at young readers to create cultural understanding. Her 1911 book Barbora: Our Little Bohemian Cousin depicts life in a Czech environment and was praised by the Czech-American press for its sympathetic portrayal of the Czech people.

Other titles in the series include works on children from Bulgaria, Serbia, Romania, Finland, Yugoslavia, Lithuania, and Czechoslovakia. Our Little Roumanian Cousin (1917), illustrated by Charles E. Meister, follows a boy named Jonitza recovering from illness and embarking on a farm trip to explore Romanian customs. Our Little Finnish Cousin, co-authored with Harriet O'Brien, portrays the daily life and traditions of a girl named Aino in a Finnish village, showing folklore, nature, and seasonal celebrations.

She co-wrote a book on Ukraine with her daughter Anna, who later authored additional series entries and collaborated with Czech illustrator Marie Fischerová-Kvěchová. Winlow's other children's stories include The Kitten that Grew Too Fat (1929), about a kitten at the British royal court, and Flick and Flock (1930), featuring two puppies. As a translator, she translated a children's book by Czech author Josef Kožíšek from Czech and a play by Alexander Ostrovsky from Russian.

== Personal life and late life ==
Winlow's daughter Anna lived in Chico, California, and assisted with her mother's later works. Both maintained strong ties to Czech culture through their family's heritage and community involvement.

Winlow died on March 5, 1963, at age 92 in her daughter's home in Chico, after several years of blindness.
