= Antonina Parker =

American politician (died 1997)

Member of the Connecticut House of Representatives from the 31st district
- In office 1977–1985
- Preceded by: Jean Thornton
- Succeeded by: Robert D. Bowden

Personal details
- Born: Antonina Brunetta; 1917 or 1918 Framingham, Massachusetts, U.S.
- Died: December 29, 1997 (aged 79)
- Party: Republican
- Spouse: Albert E. Parker
- Children: 2

Antonina "Nina" B. Parker (died December 29, 1997) was an American politician who served in the Connecticut House of Representatives from 1977 to 1985, representing the 31st district as a Republican.
