= Blanche Pitney =

American politician (1898–1986)

- Pitney c. 1946

Member of the Connecticut House of Representatives from Glastonbury
- In office 1945–1947 Serving with John Lawrence
- Preceded by: Lewis O. Kinne; Donald H. Potter
- Succeeded by: N. Glenn Richards; Olive Tyrol

Personal details
- Born: Blanche Brainard; May 24, 1898 Glastonbury, Connecticut, U.S.
- Died: October 11, 1986 (aged 88) Rhode Island, U.S.
- Party: Republican
- Spouse: Richard B. Pitney
- Children: 3

Blanche Pitney (May 24, 1898 – October 11, 1986) was an American politician who served in the Connecticut House of Representatives from 1945 to 1947, representing the town of Glastonbury as a Republican.
