= Mary Hazelton Wade =

American writer

Mary H. Wade
- Born: Mary Hazelton Blanchard; March 23, 1860; Charlestown, Massachusetts, U.S.
- Died: 1936 (aged 75–76)
- Occupation: Writer
- Spouse: Louis Francis Wade (m. 1882)
- Parent(s): Charles H. Blanchard, Caroline Cecilia Blanchard

Mary Hazelton Blanchard Wade (March 23, 1860 – 1936) was an American writer.

Born Mary Hazelton Blanchard in Charlestown, Massachusetts, daughter of Charles Hentry and Caroline Cecilia Blanchard, she was educated at a high school in Malden and then received further education by private tutors. In 1877 she began working as a teacher. On November 14, 1882, she was married to Louis Francis Wade. Mary became a prolific author, particularly of children's fiction, including contribution to the Our Little Cousin series.

== Bibliography ==
- Anahei: our little brown cousin (1901)
- Our little Indian cousin (1901)
- Little Japanese cousin (1901)
- Petrovna our little Russian cousin (1901)
- Little Eskimo cousin (1902)
- Mpuke: our little African cousin (1902)
- Alila, Our Little Philippine cousin (1902)
- Little Hawaiian cousin (1902)
- Our Little Cuban cousin (1902)
- Our Little Porto Rican cousin (1902)
- Our little Italian cousin (1903)
- Our little Swiss cousin (1903)
- The little Japanese girl (1903)
- Mari, Our little Norwegian cousin (1903)
- Our Little Siamese Cousin (1903)
- Our little Irish cousin (1904)
- Our little German cousin (1904)
- Our little Turkish cousin (1904)
- Our little Canadian cousin (1904
- Ten little Indians: stories of how indian children lived and played (1904)
- The little Norwegian girl (1904)
- Wah Sing, our little Chinese cousin (1904)
- Our little Jewish cousin (1904)
- Artin: our little Armenian cousin (1905)
- The coming of the white men; stories of how our country was discovered (1905)
- Ten big Indians: stories of famous Indian chiefs (1905)
- Indian fairy tales as told to the little children of the wigwam (1906)
- Old colony days : stories of the first settlers and how our country grew (1906)
- Our little Philippine cousin (1906)
- Our Little Russian Cousin (1906)
- Building the nation; stories of how our forefathers lived and what they did to make our country a united one (1907)
- Ten Indian hunters: stories of famous Indian hunters (1907)
- Our little Japanese cousin (1908)
- Carl: our little Swiss cousin (1909)
- Chin: our little Siamese cousin (1909)
- Little folks of North America; stories about children living in the different parts of North America (1909)
- Tessa: our little Italian cousin (1909)
- Etu, our little Eskimo cousin (1910)
- Lotus Blossom: our little Japanese cousin (1910)
- George Washington: a story and a play (1911)
- Abraham Lincoln: a story and a play (1914)
- Benjamin Franklin: a story and a play (1914)
- Ulysses Simpson Grant: a story and a play (1914)
- Pilgrims of to-day (1916)
- Swift fawn: the little foundling (1916)
- Timid hare: the little captive (1916)
- Our little Swiss cousin (1917)
- Twin travelers in South America (1918)
- The light-bringers (1919)
- Twin travelers in the holy land (1919)
- Our little Irish cousin (1920)
- Twin travelers in India (1920)
- Twin travelers in China and Japan (1922)
- The wonder workers (1922)
- Real Americans (1923)
- The master builders (1925)
- Swift fawn (1925)
- Adventurers all (1927)
- Leaders to liberty (1927)
- The boy who found out: the story of Henri Fabre (1928)
- The boy who dared: the story of William Penn (1929)
- The new pioneers (1934)
