= Mary Belvin Wade =

Community organizer and activist

Mary Belvin "Laughing Dove" Wade (November 29, 1951 – April 18, 2003) was a Native American (Monacan Indian Nation) community organizer and activist.

== Early and family ==
Wade was born in Huntington, West Virginia in 1951. In 1981, she married Al Wade.

== Career ==
Wade worked as a receptionist and legal assistant at a law firm in Richmond, Virginia. During her adulthood, she learned of her Monacan Indian heritage. She later became involved with Virginia Native American organizations and causes and was closely associated with Thomasina Jordan.

In 1995, Governor George Allen appointed Wade as a member of the Virginia Council on Indians and she was reappointed to her seat three years later by Governor Jim Gilmore, serving as the council's secretary.

Wade's work included helping to establish November as American Indian Month in Virginia, and lobbying for a successful change to state law which eliminated the fee for American Indians to correct inaccurate racial designations on their birth certificates and other official documents.

=== Virginia Indian Tribal Alliance for Life ===
In 2001, Wade was a founder and the first president of the Virginia Indian Tribal Alliance for Life (VITAL), a political action committee established to support the efforts of Virginia's tribes in influencing members of the Virginia General Assembly and U.S. Congress.

Wade was also an advocate for federal recognition of the eight tribal nations in Virginia.

== Death and legacy ==
Wade died in 2003 at the age of 51. In 2005, Wade was named to the Virginia Women in History by the Library of Virginia.
