= Blanche Pritchard McCrum =

American academic librarian

- Born: November 2, 1887; Lexington
- Died: August 26, 1969; Arlington County

Blanche Pritchard McCrum (November 2, 1887 – August 26, 1969) was a librarian and the eighth president of the Association of College and Research Libraries, from 1945 to 1946. She served on the Council of the American Library Association from 1941 through 1942.

McCrum's first library job was at Washington & Lee University. There she wrote a handbook for students' use of the library and conducted user surveys about the best use of the space. She was the director of the librarian at Wellesley College where she oversaw a staff of twenty, working there from 1937 to 1947. Among many improvements, she implemented a set of "house libraries" for the student residences, sponsoring student contests to help select the titles that would be in them.

After there, she worked as a bibliographer at the Library of Congress from 1947 to 1955. She was part of a team who compiled the 1200-page A Guide to the Study of the United States of America, published in 1960 under the direction of Roy Basler, a bibliography of nearly 7000 books chosen to be "representative books which reflect the development of life and thought in the United States."

McCrum would frequently speak on librarianship topics and wrote an influential paper called "The Idols of Librarianship," which was given at the North Carolina Library Association's general meeting in 1946 and subsequently reprinted in the Wilson Library Bulletin. In it, she identified three preconceptions or issues that got in the way of librarians being able to be effective at their jobs, outlined similar to Francis Bacon's "idols" which got in the way of people adopting his methods. These idols were:

1. of the librarians effort to master the machine
2. of low librarians esteem of themselves as 'mere librarians'
3. of bureaucracy based on the rigidity, formality and precedents.

Her assertion was that these could be overcome through changes in attitude, improved library education and better definitions of library work. She later wrote an article entitled "Neuroses of Librarianship" for the Bulletin of the Medical Library Association, also discussing the effect of librarian attitudes on their work.

== Early life and education ==
McCrum was born on November 2, 1887, in Lexington, Virginia. She received a B.A. from Boston University in 1930 and an M.A. from the University of California in 1931. She died on 26 August 1969 in Arlington County, Virginia.

== Bibliography ==
- Bibliographical procedures & style : a manual for bibliographers in the Library of Congress (1966)
- Microfilms and microcards their use in research; a selected list of references (1950)
- An estimate of standards for a college library : planned for the use of librarians when presenting budgets to administrative boards (1937)
- The library of Washington and Lee university. Handbook for students (1937)
