= Blanche Hermine Barbot =

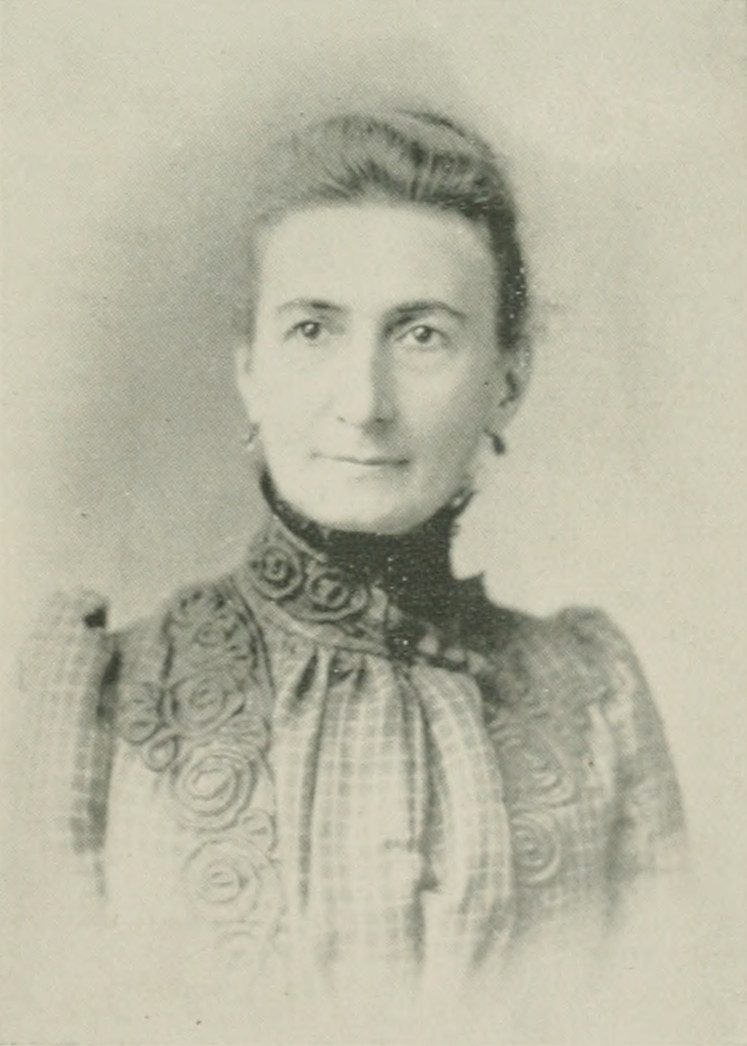

Background information
- Born: December 28, 1842; Brussels, Belgium
- Died: 17 December 1919 (aged 76) Charleston, North Carolina, United States
- Occupation(s): Musical Director, Pianist
- Instrument: Clarinet

Blanche Hermine Barbot (December 28, 1842 - December 17, 1919) was a Belgian-American musical director and pianist.

== Early life and education ==
Blanche Hermine Petit was born in Brussels, Belgium. December 28, 1842. She was the daughter of Victor and Marie Therese Petit, and inherited her musical talents from her father, who was a musician and composer of ability and a fine performer on several instruments, but especially noted for the perfection of his playing on the clarinet. From infancy, she gave evidence of a decided talent for music. She received careful training from her father. At the age of seven, she was already so accomplished a pianist that Marie Pleyel complimented Barbot most warmly on her playing and predicted for her a brilliant future upon the concert stage, for which her father destined her.

== Career ==
Her first appearance in concert was in the Theatre Italien-Francais, in Brussels, in February, 1851. This first success of Barbot was followed by many others during a tour she made with her father through the various large cities of Belgium and Holland. While in Holland, she was invited to play before the Queen, who was so delighted by the child's performance that she gave her a beautiful watch as a token of her admiration. The family removed to New York City in the spring of 1852 where several concerts were given by the father and daughter. Mr. Petit was induced to visit the South and finally to settle in Charleston, South Carolina, where he was successful as a music teacher.

After her father fell victim to yellow fever in the epidemic of 1856, leaving his family in such strained circumstances that all thought of a musical career for his daughter had to end, she became a teacher at the age of 13. When Sigismond Thalberg visited Charleston, in 1857, he called upon Barbot, and was so delighted with her playing that he invited her to render with him a duo on two pianos at his concert.

Although Barbot was an accomplished pianist, she always shrank away from appearing in public as a solo performer, except in response to the calls of charity, to which she gave her services freely. Her peculiar gift was in training and directing large musical forces. For years, she gave cantatas, oratorios and operas with the amateurs of the city. In 1875, Barbot was selected as director of the Charleston Musical Association, a society of about 100 voices, with which she gave many important works. She served as organist in St. Man's and St. Michael's churches, and also of the Cathedral.

== Personal life ==
In 1863, she married P. J. Barbot. a merchant of Charleston, who died in 1887, leaving six children.

In religion, she was Roman Catholic.

She died December 17, 1919, in Charleston and was buried in that city's Saint Lawrence Cemetery.
