= Demetrios Giannaros =

American politician (born 1949)

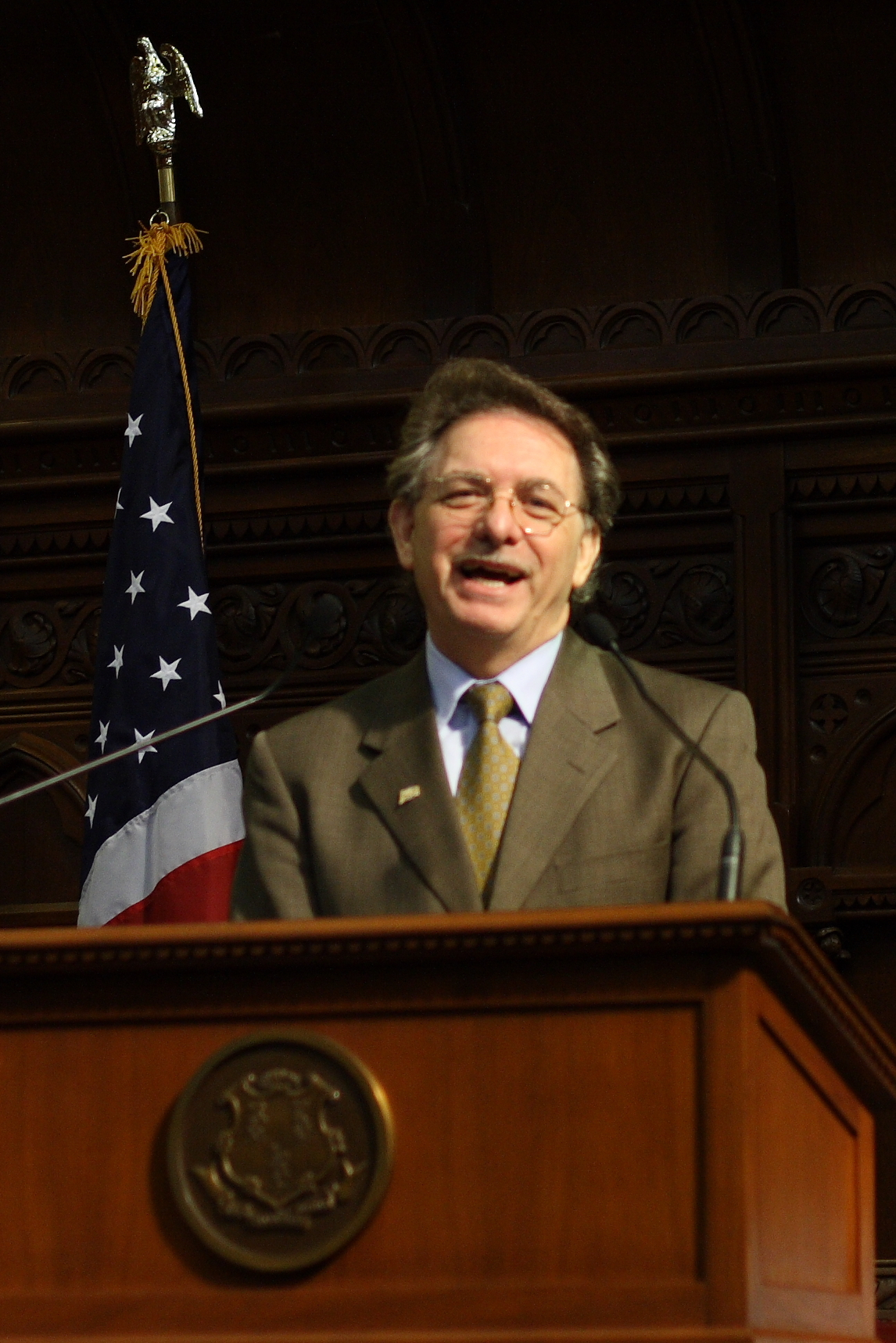

Member of the Connecticut House of Representatives from the 21st district
- In office January 4, 1995 – January 5, 2011
- Preceded by: William Wollenberg
- Succeeded by: Bill Wadsworth

Personal details
- Born: October 4, 1949 (age 76) Samos, Greece
- Party: Democratic

Demetrios Giannaros (born October 4, 1949) is an American politician who served in the Connecticut House of Representatives from the 21st district from 1995 to 2011.
