= Dorothy Barnes =

American politician (1932–1985)

Member of the Connecticut House of Representatives from the 21st district
- In office 1977–1983
- Preceded by: Thomas C. Clark
- Succeeded by: William L. Wollenberg

Personal details
- Born: Dorothy Dill; October 11, 1932 Montclair, New Jersey, U.S.
- Died: November 25, 1985 (aged 53) Farmington, Connecticut, U.S.
- Party: Republican
- Children: 1
- Education: Smith College; University of Connecticut School of Law (JD)

Dorothy Barnes (October 11, 1932 – November 25, 1985) was an American politician who served in the Connecticut House of Representatives from 1977 to 1983, representing the 21st district as a Republican.
