= Blanche Carstenson =

American batik artist, printmaker, painter, and textile collagist (1907–2002)

Blanche Emily Carstenson
- Born: Blanche Emily Williams; April 8, 1907; Gray County, Kansas
- Died: October 2, 2002 (aged 95); Denver, Colorado
- Known for: Fabric art
- Spouse: Cecil Carstenson

Blanche Emily Carstenson (1907–2002) was an American batik artist, printmaker, painter, and textile collagist.

Carstenson was born on April 8, 1907, in Gray County, Kansas. She attended the University of Omaha, the University of Kansas City, and the Kansas City Art Institute She married fellow artist Cecil Carstenson on May 5, 1927, and the couple settled in the Valentine Neighborhood of Kansas City, Missouri. Carstenson died on October 2, 2002, in Denver, Colorado.

Carstenson created the wall hanging Building Blocks for the library of UMKC. Her work is in the collection of the Nelson-Atkins Museum of Art.
