= Mamadou Traoré (murderer) =

Senegalese-born French serial rapist and murderer

Mamadou Traoré (May 11 1973–27 August 2022), known as The Bare-Handed Killer, is a Senegalese-born French serial rapist and murderer, responsible for assaulting at least six women, killing two of them, between April and October 1996.

== Biography ==
Traoré was born on May 11, 1973, in Joal-Fadiouth, Senegal, the son of Sidiki Traoré, a Bambara man who moved to Paris to work as a railway worker, and Anna Faye, a Serer woman who had practised voodoo rituals on Mamadou since his birth. When he was born, it was alleged that he was saved from being a stillbirth through his mother sprinkling blood on him, thus making him a "child of the spirits". When he was three years old, he joined his father in France, followed by his mother and brother, Ousseynou, a year later. Mamadou spent his childhood in Paris, where his two sisters were born in 1978 and 1980. His schooling was rather disturbed: at the kindergarten in Choisy, he was sometimes violent and aggressive (biting his teacher), and at others very kind. In primary, he had to retake his CP, and then his CE1. Labeled as "insufficient and undisciplined", he was expelled from school at the end of the sixth grade. In 1986, his parents separated, and Mamadou blamed the divorce on his father, whom he accused of spending all the money on the home. He then left the family environment, becoming homeless in the process. His mother then became acquainted with a Mr. Yobo, whom Mamadou considered a usurper. Soon after, Traoré got involved in street crime. From March 1988 to June 1989, he committed several violent assaults with knives. Eventually, he rubbed shoulders with the juvenile judges and educators; he was then put under surveillance, from which he escaped.

In the summer of 1989, his mother took him to Senegal on holidays, where he would stay for five years. His maternal uncles were very strict about his education, using corporal punishment. Mamadou eventually became a canoe fisherman and football champion, moving to Dakar with his paternal grandmother. He sold clothes with a cousin, and even had plans of marrying an Ivorian woman, from whom he contracted HIV. In 1994, he returned to France to do his military service, during which he learned that he had HIV, and then tried to reform himself.

On March 12, 1996, his mother, who had had two children from her new companion (a boy and a girl), kicked him out the house for smoking hashish. He then tried to defenestrate himself from a window on the 6th floor.

Mamadou Traoré wanted to take revenge on women. He was rampant in area of Paris, particularly in the 12th and 13th arrondissements, striking his victims so violently that they no longer remembered their aggressor, remaining temporarily amnesiac and, moreover, disfigured.

He was arrested around 10 PM, on December 17, 1996. Before said arrest, he had been sentenced for previous offences a total of three times in 1996 (in March for use and possession of narcotics, a 5,000 franc fine; a suspended year in prison and 240 hours of community service in June for robbery; and finally, on September 17 for assaulting several people in a laundry in the 13th arrondissement, near the highschool where he was educated - the owner of the laundry had called, complaining that his son had been attacked and threatened with a knife by Mamadou Traoré. He was fined and placed under judicial supervision, which he did not respect, for which an arrest warrant was issued for him, but nothing came from it.)

== Crimes and investigation ==
Between April 23 and October 30, 1996, Mamadou Traoré assaulted six women, two of whom died:

On the morning of April 23, at around 2 AM, Danielle Baty, a 35-year-old trilingual secretary, was attacked by Traoré in front of the "Queen Bee", a karaoke bar near her home. He hit her twice to steal her bag, and then dragged her to the entrance hall of a building, close to where she lived. There, he hit her many times until she lost consciousness. Baty was discovered around 7 AM by a bookseller, partially undressed. It took her about a year and a half to recover.

On the morning of June 4, around 4 PM, an 11-year-old was beaten by Mamadou Traoré. He wanted to rob a house in the middle of the night, and managed to find one window which was open. As he went through it, he heard a voice say "Who is it?". Frightened and panicked, Traoré beat up the little girl, as she was in his way, before escaping.

On the morning of August 25, around 5 PM, 45-year-old Nelly Bertrand was walking her dog before going to work at the Austerlitz station. Suddenly, she was attacked by Traoré, whom struck her many times, dragging her into a nearby building's elevator and then down the stairs until he reached the front door of the top floor. Bertrand died following the violent blows inflicted by Mamadou. She was discovered half-naked around 8 PM by the police, as alerted by the guard of the neighboring building. When examined, it was discovered that she had been sexually assaulted.

On the morning of October 22, around 4 PM, 20-year-old Marie-Astrid Clair, a modern literature student at the Sorbonne, was attacked by Traoré, whom had been stalking her, while she was dialing the doorway code to her home. He hit her, then dragged her to the garbage room of a neighboring building, where he raped her. She did not leave the hospital until three weeks later. Mamadou Traoré had not transmitted HIV when he raped her.

On October 25, Traoré burglarized the property of 75-year-old Francine Sarret in the middle of the night. He went into the bedroom, where Francine woke up, panicking. Mamadou took a pillow and smothered her, before hitting and raping Sarret, whom later died from her injuries. He later declared that he was a gigolo and that Sarret was his "client", a claim denied by the son of Mrs. Sarret.

On October 30, at 10 pm, the 35-year-old chef de Cabinet of minister Jean-Claude Gaudin, Laurence Eymieux, was attacked. Traoré had been lurking in the basement of an underground car park, in the residence where Eymieux lived. She screamed when she encountered him, as she leaving to get her car parked. Panicked, Traoré hit her several times before leaving, but his violent impulses overtook him, and he returned. He dragged Laurence 125 meters away to the isolated exit area of the service staircase, where he continued hitting Eymieux, as well as molesting her. She was found by a neighbor and the guard on 8 AM the following day. Around 8 PM on the day of the crime, Annie, a neighbor who had just parked her car, had called out Mamadou, driving him out of the car park. Her testimony later led to his arrest.

== List of known victims ==
Date	Location	Identity	Age	Profession
April 23, 1996	corner of Choise Avenue and Philibert-Lucot Street, in the 13th arrondissement	Danielle Baty	35	Secretary
June 4, 1996	13th arrondissement, Paris	undisclosed	11	-
August 25, 1996	Caillaux Street in the 13th arrondissement	Nelly Bertrand	40	Hostess at Austerlitz station
October 22, 1996	Rue d'Astorg in the 8th arrondissement	Marie-Astrid Clair	20	Modern literature student at the Sorbonne
October 25, 1996	Neuilly-sur-Seine	Francine Sarret	71	Retiree
October 30, 1996	12th arrondissement, Paris	Laurence Eymieux	35	Chef de Cabinet at the Ministry of Spatial Management

== Trial and imprisonment ==
The six victims of Traoré were struck with such violence, that they did not remember what had happened to them. Some now have permanent injuries, among them Danielle Baty, who has lost her senses of smell and taste. This extreme violence made the investigators think that he had used a bat, while in reality, he had used only his bare hands.

On February 7, 2000, the trial of Mamadou Traoré began at the cour d'assises in Paris. Philippe Bilger was the General Counsel, Philippe Lemaire was the lawyer of the fourth victim, Marie-Astrid Clair, and François Honnorat acted as Traoré's defense lawyer. On February 15, he was sentenced to life imprisonment, with a 22-year mandatory prison sentence.

It is supposed that he is currently incarcerated at a psychiatric hospital rather in prison, because of his violent behavior towards fellow inmates and prison guards. In addition, Traoré claimed that he was not responsible for any of the crimes he was convicted of - instead, he claimed to be a marabouté since childhood, the Vodun practises and his mother branding him "the Devil's child" made him do it. The psychiatric expert Martel interpreted "his unshakeable belief in maraboutage" as "a delusional process", while Dubec rather saw it as "a rationalization" and "the beginning of a psychic work". In his view, the discovery that he had HIV in 1995 and the rejection at the hands of his mother in 1996, led to a "displaced matricide".

== Television documentaries ==
- Enter the Accused, presented by Christophe Hondelatte, in September 2009 and April 2011, "Mamadou Traoré, the bare-handed killer", on France 2.

== Radio broadcast ==
- "Mamadou Traoré: the bare-handed killer", December 9, 2015, in L'Heure du crime, presented by Jacques Pradel on RTL.
- "Mamadou Traoré: the bare-handed killer", January 16, 2017, in Hondelatte tells, presented by Christophe Hondelatte on Europe 1.
