= Connecticut's 31st House of Representatives district =

American legislative district

Connecticut's 31st State House of Representatives district
Representative
Jill Barry; D

Connecticut's 31st House of Representatives district elects one member of the Connecticut House of Representatives. Its current representative is Jill Barry. The district is part of the town of Glastonbury.

== List of representatives ==
List of Representatives from Connecticut's 31st House District
Representative	Party	Years	District home	Note
Stanley J. Pac	Democratic	1967–1971	New Britain	Seat created
Leon F. Hermanowski	Democratic	1971–1973	New Britain	
Jean Thornton	Republican	1973–1977	Glastonbury	
Antonina Parker	Republican	1977–1985	Glastonbury	
Robert D. Bowden	Republican	1985–1995	Glastonbury	
Sonya Googins	Republican	1995–2007	Glastonbury	
Thomas J. Kehoe	Democratic	2007–2011	Glastonbury	
Prasad Srinivasan	Republican	2011–2019	Glastonbury	
Jill Barry	Democratic	2019–present	Glastonbury	

== Recent elections ==
State Election 2018: House District 31
Party	Candidate	Votes	%	±%
Democratic	Jill Barry	6,540	50.4	
Republican	Lillian Tanski	6,432	49.6	
Turnout		12,972		

State Election 2016: House District 31
Party	Candidate	Votes	%	±%
Republican	Prasad Srinivasan	9,617	68.27%	
Democratic	Matt Saunig	4,470	31.73%	
Turnout		14,087		

State Election 2014: House District 31
Party	Candidate	Votes	%	±%
Republican	Prasad Srinivasan		100	
Republican hold		Swing		

State Election 2012: House District 31
Party	Candidate	Votes	%	±%
Republican	Prasad Srinivasan	8,117	60.1%	
Democratic	Chip Flanagan	5,387	39.9%	
Turnout		13,504		
