= Blanche Slocum =

American singer

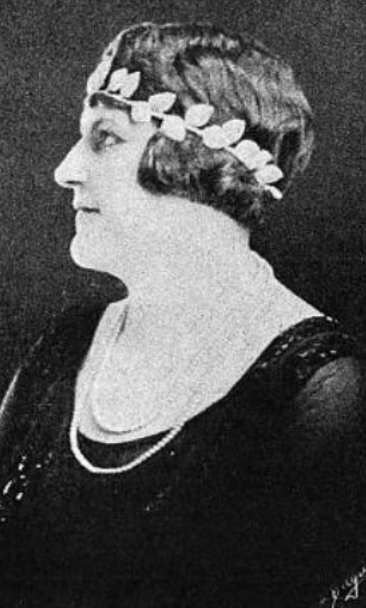
- Blanche Slocum, from a 1927 publication
- Born: Lulu Blanche Slocum; August 30, 1885; Hesperia, Michigan, U.S.
- Died: August 8, 1960 (age 74)
- Other names: Lulu B. Slocum, Blanche Ferner, Blanche Pasquale
- Occupation: Singer

Lulu Blanche Slocum (August 30, 1885 – August 8, 1960) was an American contralto singer based in Chicago.

== Early life and education ==
Slocum was born in Hesperia, Michigan, and raised in Oak Park, Illinois, the daughter of Eugene Blakesly Slocum and Elizabeth Jane Ferguson Slocum. She was a protegée of Scottish singer Mary Garden, who arranged for her to study voice in Paris.

== Career ==
Slocum taught singing at her older sister Nellie Slocum's Imperial College of Music and Dramatic Art in Chicago in 1903. She taught in Wisconsin in 1908 and 1909, gave a recital in Wausau, Wisconsin, in 1909. She was a chorus girl with the Chicago-Philadelphia Opera Company when she caught the attention of Mary Garden. She painted a watercolor portrait of Garden in 1913, in appreciation.

Slocum was studying and performing in Berlin when the United States entered World War I. After her passport was seized, she had to remain in Germany. The American consulate in Zürich eventually resolved her dilemma, and she was allowed to return to the United States in spring 1918. The Chicago Tribune and many other newspapers across the United States carried her "sensational" inside accounts of life in wartime Germany. "Here I am," she wrote, "The last American out of Germany."

Slocum was a dramatic contralto. She gave her first Chicago recital in October 1918. "Miss Slocum's voice is a contralto, inclining toward the mezzo, and is of ample compass and volume," The Musical Monitor reported afterward. "There is much in it that is beautiful and sympathetic." In the 1920s, Slocum continued performing, taught at the Chicago Music School, and painted and exhibited landscapes.

== Personal life ==
Slocum married Adolph I. Ferner Jr. in 1906. He left her three months later, and they divorced in 1907. She married Anthony V. Pasquale in 1932. She died in 1960, at the age of 74.
