= Jean-Luc Blanche =

French serial rapist (born 1958)

Jean-Luc Blanche (born February 1958), known as The Backpacker Rapist, is a French serial rapist and thief. Blanche had a consistent modus operandi—when he spotted the victim, he would break into her house at night, bind her hands and bring her to his car, driving to the outskirts of the city, under the threat of a knife. He then began terrorizing his victim, raping her once or repeatedly, usually in the middle of the countryside. His impulses now appeased, he started behaving as a friend or even a considerate companion, bringing his victim back to their home.

In 1992, Blanche was imprisoned for the first series of rapes. He was released in 2002, despite the warnings of the adverse psychiatric expertise, and he resumed raping in 2003. He was rearrested, and his second trial made it to the national headlines, because the French police could not proceed with his arrest, since Blanche acted in several departments that did not share their judicial information. The national mediatization of the case lead to the creation of the automated judicial file for perpetrators of sexual offences.

== Biography ==
Jean-Luc Blanche was born in February 1958, the sixth in a family of 14 children. Like many of his brothers and sisters, he was placed in another family at a young age, after suffering abuse at the hands of his parents. At age 8, he returned to his family in Pauvres, in Ardennes.

At 17, Jean-Luc found a job as a farm labourer, during which time he received his first criminal conviction. He stayed in prison several times for thefts and falsifying checks. During this period, Blanche also stole bank cards and cars.

In 1982, Blanche left Ardennes, got married and moved to Caen, in Calvados, where he continued his crimes. His wife eventually filed for divorce in 1990, after his seventh conviction.

== First series of rapes ==
On August 27, 1990, Jean-Luc Blanche kidnapped his ex-wife, driving her to a forest where he raped her several times. Then he tried to strangle her with a rope, which broke. He then decided to drive her home, but at a stop she opened the door and ran away.

On September 7, on Des Jardins Street in Caen, Blanche broke into the house of a woman named Nathalie at night, threatening her with tear gas and a knife. He drove her to a forest, where he raped her, before driving her home, but like his ex-wife, she jumped out and managed to flee.

On September 14, again on Des Jardins Street, Blanche broke into another woman's house, named Clara, at night, threatening her with a knife, tying her up and raping her. After the fact, he conversed with her a long while, before stealing the money in her purse and left the house, leaving her tied up.

Blanche was sentenced in September 1992 by the cour d'assises of Caen and Évry, to 20 years imprisonment.

On September 25, 2002, he was released from Caen Prison with a remission and a pardon. The psychiatric experts said, however, that Blanche is a "narcissistic pervert likely to reoffend". He moved to Reims, in Marne, with his new companion (called either Laurence or Brigitte).

== Second series of rapes ==
In late April 2003, in Vouziers in the Ardennes, Blanche molested Nadia, the nine-year-old daughter of his wife. He told her that he would "ziggle" the kid if she talked or complained about it.

On June 21, in Reims, two students of a local school (12/13-year-old Aurore and an unnamed 17-year-old) ran away from class to attend a music festival. Jean-Luc Blanche and his brother, Bruno, lured them into their home, made them drink alcohol and then raped them. The next afternoon, one of the brothers brought the teenagers back to their homes.

On July 12, Brigitte/Laurence decided to leave Jean-Luc. She went to the gendarmerie of Vouziers and lodged a complaint against him for the sexual abuse of her daughter, Nadia. The gendarmes summoned Blanche, and he was placed in custody the following day. After an interrogation, he was indicted in Charlville-Mézières, where Justice Paul-André Breton decided to place Blanche under judicial control, with no contact with his ex-wife, her daughter or the witnesses. The warnings of the psychiatric experts, however, were not present on Blanche's profile, and despite the criminal record and the unfavorable opinion of the prosecutor, the judge decided that there was insufficient evidence, and Jean-Luc was released.

On July 27, at Fontaine-la-Soret in Eure, around 11 p.m., in a rest area near the RN13, Blanche tried to strangle a woman named Charlotte. She struggled immensely, but he had the upper hand, raping her before fleeing. Charlotte didn't manage to remember his license plate because of the shock, but still filed a complaint to the gendarmerie in Bernay.

On the night of August 9, Blanche entered his ex-wife's home in Vouziers through an open window. He took a knife from the kitchen, raped Laurence/Brigitte, then struck and knocked her down, also destroying some of the property around the house. A neighbor, alerted by the cries of coming from within the household, called the gendarmerie, but in the meantime, Blanche had run away. When they learned that it was Jean-Luc, gendarmerie realized several things, among them: he disrespected his judicial control; he hadn't shown up to work since July 13; he never went to his mother's house in Reims, nor did the weekly visit to the police station. On August 13, an arrest warrant was issued for Blanche on the FPR.

On the night between August 25 and 26, between 4 and 5 p.m., on Des Jardins Street, Jean-Luc Blanche entered the studio of 19-year-old student Céline, which was on the first floor. He tied her hands behind her back, and asked her to go and withdraw money from a vending machine. They left the studio, with Céline put in the back of a stolen car, a black Volkswagen Polo. Instead of heading to the city center, Blanche drove to the countryside, parking on a small dirt road near Pont-l'Évêque. He claimed to be a part of a network of human traffickers and must deliver her to his Russian or Turkish accomplices, so she could be prostituted in Eastern Europe. However, Jean-Luc suggested that he would not do that and release her, on condition that Céline had sex with him. Blanche took her to a clearing, where he raped her. Then he tried to talk to her, attempting to make Céline pity him by saying that his wife had left him. They left by car, with Blanche stopping on several occasions, submitting his victim to psychological blackmail by pretending to hesitate, telling her that if he released her, he would lose his contract and certainly the confidence of his accomplices. Céline ended up giving in. He stopped the car on a farm road near a cornfield, where he raped her again for much longer, and in a more brutal manner. They then left in the direction of Caen, with Jean-Luc admitting that he had lied to her. Céline how much she had handled, she was revolted. Blanche stopped the car and threatened her with a knife, then told her he would take her with him to southern France. Céline removed the car key from the ignition, threw it out together with Jean-Luc's mobile phone and grabbed the knife. While he was outside getting back the key, Céline searched through his bag and discreetly took her abductor's driving license and put it in her wallet. She threatened Jean-Luc with the knife, demanding they leave towards Caen. Blanche, helpless, promised that he would do nothing, and let her drive. She parked in front of her house, whereupon he took the driver's license she took and returned it to him.

That same day, Céline went to the police station in Caen. The police went with her to the places mentioned, and at the site of the second rape near the cornfield, they found condoms used by Blanche. They also found the mobile phone, which was thrown out of the car window by Céline.

On the night of September 1, in Orsay, Blanche entered the home of 38-year-old executive assistant Martine, through an open window. He forced her to drink alcohol before kidnapping her. Jean-Luc threatened Martine that he would place her in a brothel, taking her to Dijon in Côte-d'Or, where he raped her several times before taking her home, warning her that he would return if she told anybody. Ten days later, encourage by her aunt, Martine complained to the Besançon police officers in Doubs.

On September 4, at around 4 p.m., in Saint-Loup-Géanges in Saône-et-Loire, Blanche entered the home of a 36-year-old real estate negotiator named Solange, whose husband had just gone to work. He threatened her with a knife, tying her hands behind her back and pulled her down the hall. The noise woke up Solange's two children, who asked the strange gentleman who is with her. She reassured them by telling that she was helping the man, whose car had broken down. The children went back to bed, while Jean-Luc forced her into his car. While driving, he told Solange of incredible stories about gambling debts allegedly incurred by her husband, then of gangs who took her husband's vehicle to commit a robbery, and were then ordered to kidnap her so they could ensure his silence. While driving down a forest path, he took the woman out the car, then he simulated a strangling gesture with some string. They then drove back to an old, isolated and uninhabited house in Drôme, for which Blanche had stolen the keys. The man chained Solange's arms in front of the fireplace, forced her to drink strong alcohol, undressed her and passed the blade of a knife along her body. When she was dead drunk, Blanche released her, lay her on the bed and raped her, before acting tenderly towards her. On the next day, he offered Solange to shower and prepare breakfast. They left by car, towards her house. Blanche borrowed Solange's mobile phone to call her mother, so he could inform her that her daughter would be attending his birthday at his home in Reims. Jean-Luc then parked the car on a parking lot at the entrance of Chalon-sur-Saône so he could smoke a cigarette. At this time, Solange managed to break free and phoned her husband, explaining where she was and telling him to come pick her up as soon as possible. Blanche, helpless, ran away.

== Arrest ==
On September 7, Jean-Luc Blanche was arrested at his mother's apartment building in Reims, where his concubine, Rachida, also lived. In his car, authorities found the string with which he tied the hands of his victims, along with audio cassettes and a CD player with Céline's voice recorded on them.

During the interrogation, Blanche told the police that Solange (his last victim) was the "best shot of his life". He also stated that in June, Aurore claimed to be over 15 years old, and that both girls had consented. The rape of the 17-year-old was later not included at trial.

Jean-Luc Blanche described to the examinating psychiatrist the traumatic memories of his childhood concerning his father, who:

- broke a kerosene lamp on his mother's head, causing her burns
- attacked his mother
- had his mother eat dirt
- raped his little sisters
- locked him in the cellar for making an ink spot
- hanged him by the feet and whipped him with a thong
- put him outside at night naked and whipped him with nettles, when he was just 5 years old
- attached a dog collar to him and made him eat excrements

== Trial ==
On June 23, 2006, the trial of Jean-Luc Blanche and his brother Bruno began at the Charleville-Mézièrs court.

On each day of the trial, Jean-Luc entered the court after a suicide attempt. The first day by slashing the veins of his left arm, the second by slashing his carotid artery, the third by banging his head against a wall and the fourth by trying to hang himself with the toilet chain in the bathroom, which broke.

Jean-Luc refused having even harmed his victims, while Bruno denied raping Aurore. Bruno attempt to make the court pity him, because he was in mourning: his concubine, Stéphanie Baudin, had been found dead at home on June 9.

Jean-Luc refused to apologize to Solange, his last victim, as he claimed that it was consensual. His defense tried to mitigate the circumstances through the child abuse, during which Blanche received no love or care, with his ultra-violent farm worker father punished his children harshly.

Pierrette Varin, their mother, was unable to say how many children she had had, nor could remember their names.

In June 2006, Jean-Luc Blanche was sentenced to life imprisonment with a 22-year mandatory prison sentence by the Charleville-Mézièrs cour d'assises.

The whole cased was described as a "judicial blunder", which caused a lot of noise, contributing to the creation of the sex offender files.

== See also ==
- Mamadou Traoré

== General references ==
Documentaries used as a source for writing this article:

- "Jean-Luc Blanche, the 'Backpacker Rapist'" in May 2009 and January 2011, in Enter the Accused, presented by Christophe Hondelatte on France 2.
- "The Backpacker Rapist" (second report) in "...in Champagne-Ardennes" on December 9, 16 and 24, 2013 in "Crimes", on NRJ 12.
- "Jean-Luc Blanche, the 'Backpacker Rapist'" in Crimes in the East, on France 3.
