= Margot Blanche =

French/Filipino singer and songwriter

- Also known as: Margot Blanche
- Born: Margot Blanche Moussempes; August 29, 1983 (age 43); Hong Kong
- Origin: Hong Kong, United States
- Genres: Pop, R&B
- Occupation: Singer-songwriter
- Years active: 1990–present
- Website: Official site

Margot Blanche Moussempes (French: [maʁɡo blɑ̃ʃ]; born August 29, 1983) is a French/Filipino singer and songwriter.

== Early life ==
Blanche was born in Hong Kong on August 29, 1983, to Nicolas Moussempes and Patricia Muassab. Blanche's father was born in Paris, France, while her mother is of Filipino and Syrian Descent. She began singing at the age of 3 and was inspired at a very young age by both popular and classical music. Blanche held heroes like Maria Callas, Mariah Carey and Whitney Houston alongside jazz influences like Ray Charles, Billie Holiday and Nina Simone, but also received rigorous training at the age of 9 with a noted local opera soprano. Her talent was first discovered by her elementary school music teacher who urged Blanche's parents to enroll their daughter in professional voice lessons. Blanche eventually began training with a classical vocal coach, tenor Jimmy Chan and at age 11 she won her first competition at the prestigious Hong Kong Schools Music Festival. She went on to win other competitions, and by the age of 15 she was accepted as a pupil through the Hong Kong Academy of Performing Arts with prominent Hong Kong opera diva, Katusha Tsui Fraser. Very soon becoming constrained by the rigid and academic technique necessary to perform opera, Blanche began turning to R&B and Soul music as a way of self-expression. She recorded her first demo tape at the age of 15, which consisted of a variety of cover songs and musical theater songs. In the following years, she performed at local talent shows, local clubs and competitions and was cast in her high school production as the role of Marilyn Monroe, in the musical adaptation of the movie Some Like It Hot.

== Career ==
In 2001, Blanche moved to New York City to further her career as a recording artist. On October 30, 2008, Blanche's first independent album ‘Pages in My Diary’ was released. Wanting to be in control of her career and artistic development, the project was entirely directed and independently financed by Blanche. She enlisted several producers and artists to collaborate with on the album including budding producer Kevin '12' Samuels, Burlesque Band Leader Ronnie Magri (who had previously worked with performers like Dita Von Teese), Terrence Lewis, an upcoming Cincinnati Producer and Eric Applegate, with whom she had worked with on her previous EP. The album features songs written and composed by Margot, all of which reflect her musical influences and life experiences.

Blanche was on the Ballot for the 2009 Grammy Awards in four categories, Best New Artist, Best Pop Vocal, Song of the Year and Record of the Year. She is currently a finalist in the 8th annual Independent Music Awards with her song, 'Let It Rain' nominated for the R&B Song of the Year Award and was recently also a finalist in the USA Songwriting Competition for her song 'You're Here'.

== Musicianship ==
=== Vocal Ability ===
Blanche has a Soprano vocal range which spans four octaves. Since her debut she has been compared to the likes of Christina Aguilera and Mariah Carey in her melismatic vocal styling and range and she is able to adapt to different sounds and styles with ease. Blogcritics wrote in 2008 that "Where many people who attempt multiple styles of music within one recording come across as unconvincing or insincere, Margot Blanche is able to carry them all off with equal aplomb and does so sounding like she was born to sing each particular genre. While in part this is due to her ability as a vocalist, it's also a tribute to her talents as a performer."

=== Themes and musical style ===
The constant theme in Blanche's music and lyrics is love, although she has written on other subjects including spirituality, female empowerment, and grief. Because of her musical influences, Blanche admits she prefers to write songs with more personal subjects in order to connect with her listeners on a deeper, more honest level. Lyrically, she incorporates her real life and experiences into her songwriting. After her brother's death in January 2008, Blanche turned to music and writing as a way of coping with her grief and emotions. Her songs "Let It Rain" and "Beautiful Soul" are heavily influenced by those experiences.

Blanche's 2008 album Pages In My Diary is a fusion of old world jazz with today's hip hop & urban beats. She utilizes sounds, inspirations, and stylistic references from periods of the 1920s, 1930s, and 1940s. She also incorporates pinup glamor and burlesque into her image and live performances. For the production of the album, Blanche looked to Billie Holiday, Isaac Hayes, Bessie Smith, Cab Calloway, The Tommy Dorsey Orchestra, Henry Mancini, Jo Stafford and The Meters among other artists for inspiration. Blanche even goes so far on some tracks as to recreate the thin compressed sound of an old mono tube radio to help craft an authentic atmosphere.

When Blanche first conceived the theme of Pages In My Diary, she was not just inspired by the vintage sounds, but also with the look and stylings of the Golden Era of Hollywood, Pinup glamor and Burlesque Cabaret. She referenced actresses Jean Harlow, Jane Russell, Marilyn Monroe, Clara Bow, Bettie Page and Vivien Leigh as well as pinup artists Alberto Vargas and Gil Elvgren as sources of inspiration for her image. She handpicked Pinup photographer Viva Van Story, who has also captured celebrated pinup models Jami Deadly and Masuimi Max, for the photo sessions.

== Discography ==
=== Albums ===
- 2008: Pages In My Diary

=== Singles/EPs ===
- 2007: "At The End"
- 2005: "Margot Blanche"
