= Mary F. Nixon-Roulet =

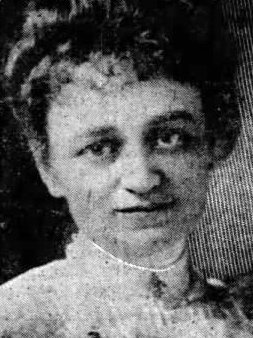
- Born: Mary F. Nixon; May 31, 1866 Indianapolis, Indiana, United States
- Died: 1930 (aged 63–64)
- Spouse: Dr. Alfred de Roulet

Mary F. Nixon-Roulet (died 1930, sometimes Mary F. Nixon de Roulet) was an author of books for children and Christian audiences in the late 19th and early 20th century. She wrote numerous biographies of Catholic saints, and her work was regularly promoted in Catholic and Presbyterian publications and in the popular press. She also was a regular contributor to the Our Little Cousin series, writing volumes including Our Little Spanish Cousin; Jean, Our Little Australian Cousin; Kalitan, Our Little Alaskan Cousin; and others for the publisher L.C. Page & Co. The series offered children of the time "delightful descriptions in story form of the life of the children of all these countries." She also wrote a book of Japanese fairy tales and published short stories in compilations and publications like the New-York Tribune.

A Catholic convert, Mary Nixon was raised into a religious family of writers and scholars. She was the daughter of Flora Jewell Nixon, a member of society in St. Louis, Missouri. A grandfather was a Protestant missionary among the Seminoles. After hearing many Native American stories as a child, she maintained an interest in the welfare of "Indian children" and supported them monetarily throughout her life.

As a young woman, Nixon married physician Alfred de Roulet. They lived with their family in Chicago, Illinois.

In 1903 for her work, Nixon-Roulet received a benediction from Pope Leo XIII.

== Works ==
- With a Pessimist in Spain (1897)
- Lasca (1898)
- The Blue Lady's Knight (1899) - very rare
- Saint Anthony in art: and other sketches (1901)
- The Trail of the Dragon and Other Stories (1906) - contributor
- Our Little Spanish Cousin (1906)
- Our Little Brazilian Cousin (1907)
- Kalitan, Our Little Alaskan Cousin (1907)
- Our Little Grecian Cousin (1908)
- Jean, Our Little Australian Cousin (1908)
- Japanese Folk Stories and Fairy Tales (1908)
- Our Little Hungarian Cousin (1909)
- A Bit of Old Ivory, and other stories (1910) - contributor
- The Spaniard at Home (1910)
- Indian Folk Tales (1911)
