= Blanche Bolduc =

Canadian painter

Marie-Louise Blanche Bolduc (April 13, 1906 or 1907 – February 14, 1998) was a Canadian folk artist living in Quebec.

== Early life ==
The daughter of Thaddée and Virginie Bolduc, she was born in Baie-Saint-Paul; her sister Yvonne also became an artist.

== Career ==
Mainly self-taught, she began painting local scenes and characters at the age of 58. Her work appeared in exhibitions in Quebec, Ontario and France. She received the silver medal from the Académie des Arts, Sciences et Lettres in Paris in 1966.

Her work is included in the collections of the Musée national des beaux-arts du Québec, the Charlevoix Museum, the McCord Museum in Montreal, McGill University and the National Gallery of Canada.

Bolduc died in the Centre hospitalier Charlevoix at the age of 90.
