= Mythologies II =

2024 studio album by Danaë Xanthe Vlasse

Studio album by Danaë Xanthe Vlasse
- Released: July 19, 2024
- Recorded: 2023–2024
- Studio: Abbey Road Studios (London); East West Studios (Los Angeles); CasaFraga (Buenos Aires); Studio Hill (Austin); Allegro Recordings (Burbank); The Bridge (Brooklyn)
- Genre: Classical
- Length: 45:00
- Language: English
- Label: Studio Hill Records
- Producer: Danaë Xanthe Vlasse; Emilio D. Miler; Robert Thies; Hai Nguyen; Kitt Wakeley; Jeff Atmajian

Danaë Xanthe Vlasse chronology
Mythologies (2022)	Mythologies II (2024)

Mythologies II is the seventh studio album by French-American composer and pianist Danaë Xanthe Vlasse, which was nominated for a Grammy Award for Best Classical Compendium in 2024. The album is a follow-up to Mythologies, which won a Grammy Award for Best Classical Solo Vocal Album in 2022.

== History ==
Mythologies II features sopranos Sangeeta Kaur and Hila Plitmann, tenor Omar Najmi, pianist Robert Thies, and Royal Philharmonic Orchestra conducted by Michael Shapiro. Vlasse's songs are written about classic Greek myths with a perspective on fundamental truths about the human condition and societal values. Vlasse composed the music and lyrics, with the exception of "DREAMS OF ITHACA" (lyrics written by David R. Brunt.) Recorded at Abbey Road Studios with additional recordings in Los Angeles, New York City, Austin, and Buenos Aires, the record was released on Studio Hill Records in the US on July 19, 2024.

== Track listing ==
No.	Title	Writer(s)	Length
1.	"MEDUSA & PERSEUS"	Danaë Xanthe Vlasse	12:16
2.	"ANDROMEDA, I. "Ocean Overture""	Danaë Xanthe Vlasse	2:38
3.	"ANDROMEDA, II. "Cassiopeia's Lament""	Danaë Xanthe Vlasse	4:32
4.	"ANDROMEDA, II. "Andromeda's Farewell""	Danaë Xanthe Vlasse	2:59
5.	"ANDROMEDA, IV. "Cetus""	Danaë Xanthe Vlasse	2:46
6.	"ANDROMEDA, V. "Perseus' Proposal""	Danaë Xanthe Vlasse	3:36
7.	"ANDROMEDA, VI. "Andromeda's Vow & Lover's Duet""	Danaë Xanthe Vlasse	3:56
8.	"DREAMS OF ITHACA"	Danaë Xanthe Vlasse, David R. Brunt	12:52

== Personnel ==
=== Musicians ===
- Danaë Xanthe Vlasse – Composer and lyrics (tracks 1–8), singing bowl, rattle, thunder drum, orchestral chimes (track 1), ocean drum (tracks 2,5), piano string effects (tracks 2,4,5), and lyra (track 8)
- Sangeeta Kaur – Soprano (tracks 1, 3–8)
- Hila Plitmann – Soprano (tracks 1, 3, 4, 8)
- Omar Najmi – Tenor (tracks 1, 5–8)
- Robert Thies – Pianist (tracks 1–8)
- Royal Philharmonic Orchestra (tracks 1–8)
- Emilio D. Miler – Concert toms (track 1)
- Michael Shapiro – Conductor (tracks 1–8)
- Orchestrators – Jeff Atmajian (lead orchestrator and booth reader, track 8), Jon Kull (track 1), Patrick Russ (tracks 2–7), Geoffrey Alexander (tracks 2–7)

=== Technical ===
- Producers – Danaë Xanthe Vlasse, Emilio D. Miler, Robert Thies, Hai Nguyen, Kitt Wakeley, and Jeff Atmajian
- Executive producers – Hai Nguyen, Sangeeta Kaur
- Associate producers – Hila Plitmann, Greg Scelsa, Duy Tran
- Mix engineer – Gerhard Joost, Studio Hill Austin (1–8)
- Mastering engineer – Legacy Sound, Silas Brown (tracks 1–8)
- Lead engineer, Abbey Road Studios – John Barrett (tracks 1–8)
- Recording engineer – Gerhard Joost (tracks 1–8)
- Pro Tools engineer – Daniel Hayden (tracks 1–8)
- Assistant engineer – Freddie Light (tracks 1–8)
- Second assistant engineer – Martin Riley (tracks 1–8)
- Additional engineers – Emilio D. Miler (track 1), Brian Vibberts (track 1), David Merrill (tracks 1–8), Matthew Brownlie (track 1), Matthew Snyder (track 8)
- Assistant engineers – Greg Tock (tracks 1–8), Myra Choo (track 8), Chaz Sexton (track 1)
- Assistant producers – Nicholas A. Booth (tracks 1–8)
- Copyists – Colin Rae, Jaun Camilo Arboleda, Duy Tran
- Album artwork – Greg Spalenka
- Graphic design – Jeff Burne

=== Recording studios ===
- Abbey Road Studios (London)
- East West Studios (Los Angeles)
- CasaFraga (Buenos Aires)
- Studio Hill (Austin)
- Allegro Recordings (Burbank)
- The Bridge (Brooklyn)

== Release history ==
Region	Date	Format	Label
United States	July 19, 2024	CD, digital download	Studio Hill Records
