= Robert Thies =

American pianist, composer, and producer

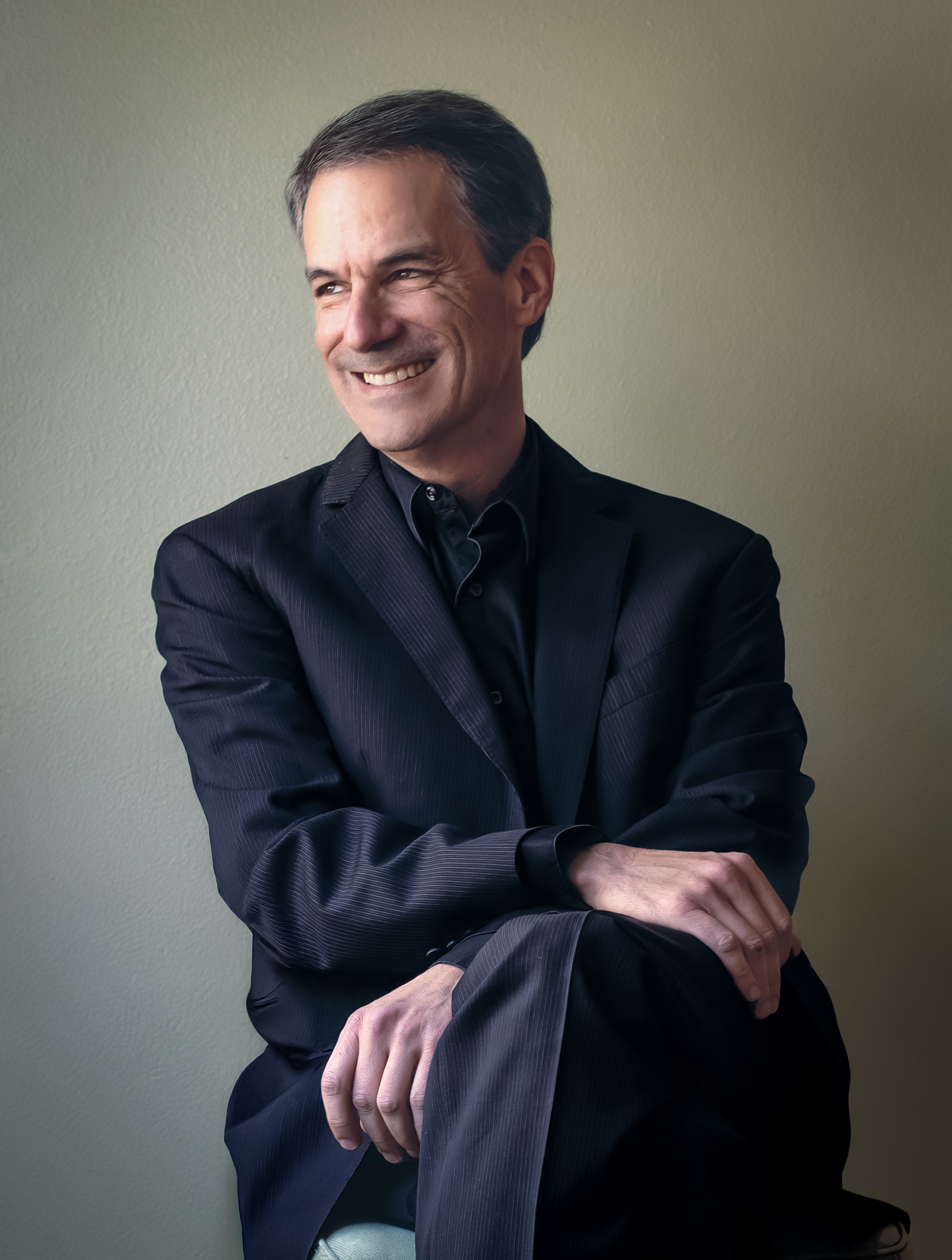

Background information
- Born: Neptune City, New Jersey, U.S.
- Genres: Classical
- Occupations: Pianist; composer; recording artist; producer
- Years active: 1987–present
- Website: www.robertthies.org

Robert Edward Thies is an American pianist, composer, recording artist, and producer. In 1995, he won the Gold Medal at the International Prokofiev Competition in St. Petersburg, Russia. In 2024, he was nominated for a Grammy Award for Mythologies II. As a concert pianist, his work encompasses performing solo recitals, chamber music, and concerti with orchestras internationally. He has worked with such film composers as John Williams, James Horner, James Newton Howard, Danny Elfman, and Mychael Danna, and his playing has been featured in films, The Fabelmans, Indiana Jones and the Dial of Destiny, Concussion, Fracture, Life of Pi, and Fifty Shades Freed, among others.

== Early life and education ==
Thies was born in Neptune, New Jersey. His family moved to Los Angeles when he was three years of age. As a young child, Thies began playing piano by by ear, repeating melodies he heard on television, and started formal piano lessons at the age five. He later studied piano with Robert Turner. In 1987, he was a featured pianist for a Chinese American 10-day music tour in Shanghai, Beijing, and Nanjing, and In 1991 won the grand prize and first prize for "Best Pianist" at the 23rd Young Artist Awards in Southern California. Thies was a student of Daniel Pollack at USC Thornton School of Music where he graduated with a Bachelor's Degree in 1993 and a Master of Music Degree in 1995.

== Career ==
In 1995, Thies won the Gold Medal at the International Prokofiev Competition in St. Petersburg, Russia, becoming the first American pianist in 37 years to win first prize in a Russian piano competition since Van Cliburn won the Tchaikovsky Competition in 1958. He was recognized by the White House, Dianne Feinstein, and Los Angeles Mayor Richard Riordan. The City of Los Angeles proclaimed February 16, 1996 as "Robert Edward Thies Day." In 1997, Thies premiered the Piano Sonata of Henryk Górecki during the composer’s “Górecki Autumn” residency at USC in Los Angeles. He was a laureate in the 1998 Tchaikovsky Competition in Moscow and competed as a semi-finalist.

Thies' concerts have been broadcast throughout the United States, Russia, Estonia, Latvia, Bolivia, Hungary, Mexico, and New Zealand. He has been a featured performer with the Louisville Orchestra, Auckland Philharmonia, St. Petersburg Philharmonic Orchestra, National Symphony Orchestra of Mexico, and Los Angeles Philharmonic, among others and has performed at the Philharmonia Grand Hall, St. Petersburg, The Great Hall of the Moscow Conservatory, Palacio de Bellas Artes, Walt Disney Concert Hall, Ambassador Auditorium, and others.

In 2017, Thies was a featured pianist in Philip Glass's score to Jane, a documentary about Jane Goodall, which was played to the film at the Hollywood Bowl

In 2024, he was nominated for a Grammy Award for Mythologies II for Best Classical Compendium.

=== Composer ===
As a composer, Thies has created five albums with flutist, Damjan Krajacic, for Gentle Rain Music called Blue Landscapes: Music from a Quieter Place. They also partnered with NY Times reporter, Ian Urbina on his book The Outlaw Ocean, and released Blue Landscapes: The Seas. Blue Landscapes III: Frontiers, Blue Landscapes IV: Meditations, and Blue Landscapes V: Forever the Sea all won Global Music Awards.

== Discography ==
- 2025 – Thies, Damjan Krajacic – Blue Landscapes V: Forever the Sea (Music from a Quieter Place) – Piano, Composer
- 2025 – Thies, Damjan Krajacic, Chris Wabich – Northern Winds – Piano, Composer
- 2024 – Danaë Xanthe Vlasse – Mythologies II – Primary Artist, Producer, Piano
- 2024 – Thies, Damjan Krajacic – Blue Landscapes IV: Meditations (Music from a Quieter Place) – Piano, Composer
- 2021 – Thies, Damjan Krajacic, Ian Urbina – Blue Landscapes: The Seas (Inspired by ‘The Outlaw Ocean’ a book by Ian Urbina) – Piano, Composer
- 2021 – Danaë Xanthe Vlasse – Mythologies – Piano
- 2020 – Danaë Xanthe Vlasse – Poème – Primary Artist, Piano
- 2020 – Thies, David Sapadin – Brahms: Sonatas for Clarinet and Piano
- 2020 – Thies, Damjan Krajacic – Blue Landscapes III: Frontiers (Music from a Quieter Place) – Piano, Composer
- 2020 – Bruce Broughton's Sonata for Cello and Piano – A Changed Embrace – Piano
- 2019 – Gernot Wolfgang – Vienna and the West – Piano
- 2019 – Chad Cannon – The Dreams of a Sleeping World – Piano
- 2016 – Elia Cmiral – The Chamber Works – Piano
- 2016 – Thies, Damjan Krajacic – Blue Landscapes II: Discoveries (Music from a Quieter Place) – Piano, Composer
- 2016 – Shie Rozow – Musical Fantasy: Works by Shie Rozow – Thies, Primary Artist, Arranger, Piano
- 2016 – Gernot Wolfgang – Passing Through – Groove-Oriented Chamber – Piano
- 2015 – Linda Wang – The French Collection: Fauré, Ravel, Messiaen, Saint-Saëns – Piano
- 2015 – Bruce Babcock – Time, Still – Chamber, Vocal, and Choral Music – Piano
- 2015 – Dan Redfeld – A Hopeful Place – Piano
- 2013 – The Chamber Orchestra at St. Matthew’s – Music from the Left Coast – Piano
- 2013 – Caroline Campbell – From Hollywood with Love – Piano
- 2012 – Thies, Damjan Krajacic – Blue Landscapes – Piano, Composer
- 2011 – Kevin Kaska – The Chamber Works – Piano
- 2010 – Josh Groban – Illuminations – Harpsichord, Piano
- 2006 – Danny Elfman – Serenada Schizophrana – Keyboards, Piano
- 2006 – Robert Thies – Live in Recital – Primary Artist, Piano
- 2006 – Gernot Wolfgang – Common Ground – Piano
- 2005 – Gary Gray, New Hollywood String Quartet, Robert Thies, Richard Todd – Brahms: Clarinet Quintet; Dohnányi: Sextet in C major – Piano, Producer
- 2005 – Thies with flutist, Boglarka Kiss – Air – Piano

== Selected filmography ==
- 2024 – Dear Santa – Celeste
- 2023 – Diary of a Wimpy Kid Christmas: Cabin Fever – Piano
- 2023 – Candy Cane Lane – Keyboards
- 2022 – The Fabelmans – Celeste
- 2022 – The Lost City – Piano
- 2021 – 8-Bit Christmas – Piano
- 2021 – Ghostbusters: Afterlife – Celeste, Piano
- 2021 – The Conjuring: The Devil Made Me Do It – Piano
- 2020 – A Beautiful Day in the Neighborhood – Piano
- 2020 – The Way Back – Piano
- 2019 – Annabelle Comes Home – Piano
- 2018 – Painted Woman – Piano
- 2018 – Green Book – Keyboards
- 2017 – La La Land – Celeste, Piano
- 2017 – Logan – Piano
- 2017 – Jumanji: Welcome to the Jungle – Piano
- 2016 – Penny Dreadful Seasons 1, 2 & 3 – Piano
- 2016 – Independence Day: Resurgence – Keyboards
- 2016 – The Accountant
- 2015 – The Good Dinosaur – Piano, Toy Piano
- 2015 – Concussion – Piano
- 2012 – The Amazing Spider-Man – Piano
- 2012 – Life of Pi – Piano
- 2011 – Moneyball – Piano
- 2009 – The Time Traveler's Wife – Piano
- 2008 – Body of Lies – Piano
- 2007 – Year of the Dog – Piano
- 2007 – American Gangster – Piano
- 2005 – King Kong
- 2005 – Flightplan – Piano
