= Eru Matsumoto =

Japanese cellist and multimedia artist

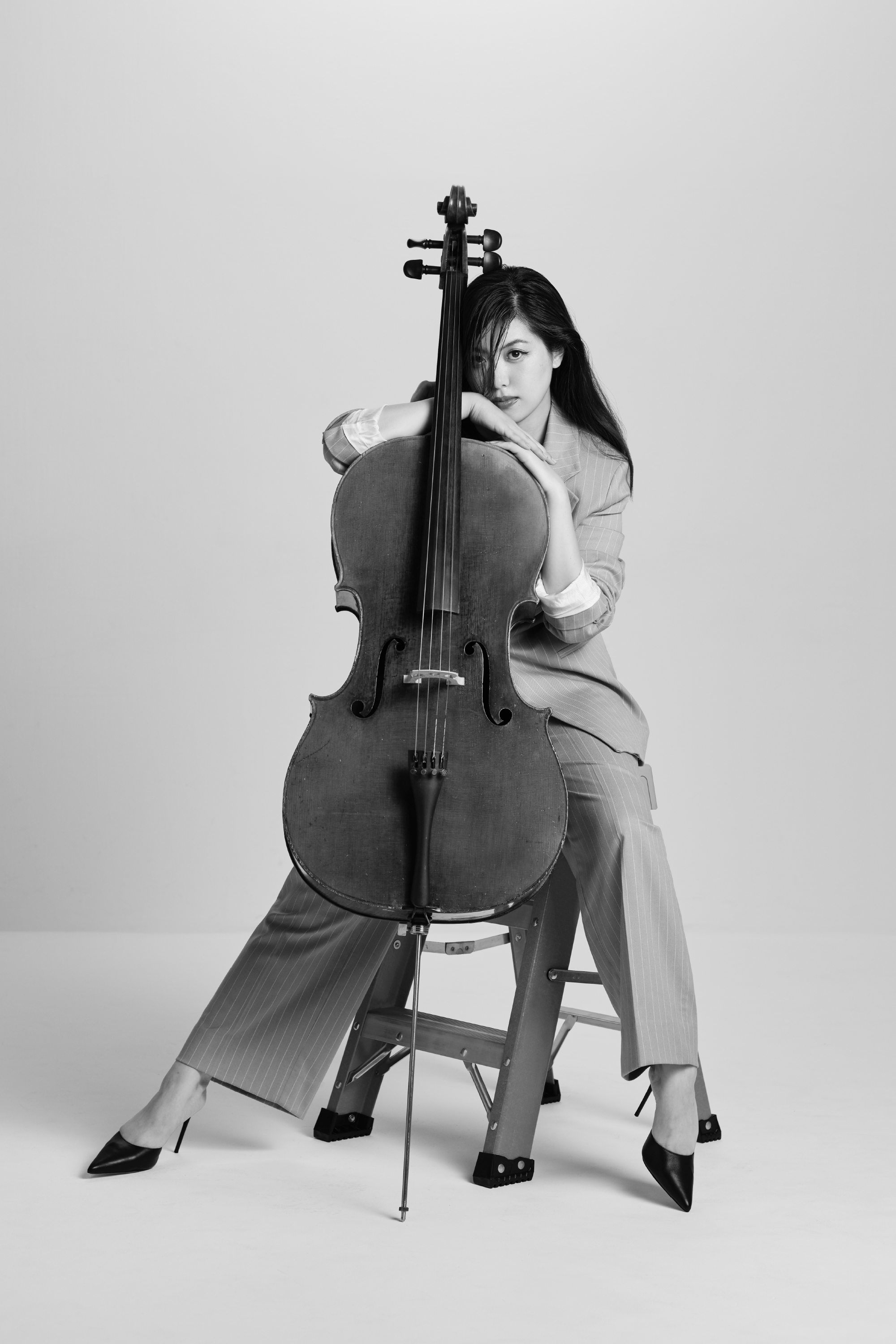
- Matsumoto in 2022

Background information
- Occupations: Cellist, multimedia artist
- Years active: 1997–present
- Website: www.erumatsumoto.com

Eru Matsumoto is a Japanese cellist and multimedia artist. She received a Grammy Award for Best New Age, Ambient or Chant Album as a collaborator on Triveni, a project with Wouter Kellerman and Chandrika Tandon.

Matsumoto was named to the Forbes 30 Under 30 list in the Art & Style category.

She is known for interdisciplinary projects that combine music, science, and technology, including The Sound of Art, a research initiative exploring the translation of visual art into music through algorithmic analysis in collaboration with Harvard-affiliated researchers and an astrophysicist.

== Early life and education ==
Matsumoto was raised in the United States and began studying the cello at the age of six. She later attended the Juilliard School, where she studied with David Soyer. She also received instruction from Andrew Shulman and Yehuda Hanani.

== Career ==
Matsumoto has performed internationally as a soloist, chamber musician, and recording artist. In 2018, she appeared with the Tokyo Philharmonic Orchestra at Suntory Hall in Tokyo as part of The Music of John Williams: Star Wars and Beyond, a concert featuring the music of composer John Williams. As a recording musician, Matsumoto contributed cello performances to Demi Lovato's album Confident, which was nominated for Best Pop Vocal Album at the 59th Annual Grammy Awards. She also contributed to Danaë Xanthe Vlasse's album Mythologies, which won the Grammy Award for Best Classical Solo Vocal Album at the 64th Annual Grammy Awards. In 2024, Matsumoto was nominated for a Grammy Award as a collaborator on Triveni, a project with Wouter Kellerman and Chandrika Tandon.

She has presented two TEDx talks, The Silence in Music at SOAS University of London and Imagination: The Most Important Human Superpower at Wake Forest University in North Carolina.

== Research and multimedia projects ==
Matsumoto created The Sound of Art, an interdisciplinary project that explored the conversion of visual art into music through algorithmic analysis. According to Forbes, the project developed into a collaborative research initiative involving Harvard University and an astrophysicist. She has also participated in research examining relationships between sound frequencies, healing, sleep science, and cellular research.

== Wajima Resonance Project ==
In October 2025, Matsumoto participated in the Wajima Resonance Project, a cultural recovery initiative following the 2024 Noto Peninsula earthquake. In the same year, she performed at Wajima Junior High School in Ishikawa Prefecture using a Wajima-nuri lacquered cello that had been recovered from a workshop destroyed in the earthquake. As part of the project, she performed Pablo Casals' arrangement of Song of the Birds.

== Awards and recognition ==
- Forbes 30 Under 30 (Art & Style, 2021)
- Grammy Award for Best New Age, Ambient or Chant Album (2025, Triveni)
