= Chandrika Tandon =

Indian-American businesswoman, philanthropist, and musician

Chandrika Krishnamurthy Tandon
- Born: Chandrika Krishnamurthy; 1954 (age 71–72); Chennai, Tamil Nadu, India
- Education: Madras Christian College; University of Madras; IIM Ahmedabad
- Occupations: Businesswoman, Philanthropist, Vocalist, Composer
- Spouse: Ranjan Tandon
- Children: Lita Tandon
- Relatives: Indra Nooyi (Sister)
- Website: https://chandrikatandon.com/

Chandrika Krishnamurthy Tandon (née Krishnamurthy; born 1954) is an Indian-American businesswoman, philanthropist, and a Grammy-winning musical artist. She is primarily known for her business ventures as the first Indian-American woman to be elected partner at McKinsey and Company. In 2015, Chandrika Tandon and her husband, Ranjan Tandon, donated $100 million to the NYU Polytechnic School of Engineering, now named the NYU Tandon School of Engineering, in what was the largest donation by an Indian American in the United States. Tandon has served as a trustee to New York University, NYU Langone Health, American India Foundation, and was a member of the President's Council on International Activities at Yale University and the President's Advisory Council at the Berklee College of Music. She also is on the Board of Governors for the New York Academy of Sciences.

Chandrika Tandon is also a composer and vocalist, trained by masters in Hindustani, Carnatic, and Western traditions. Tandon released her first studio album, Soul Call, in 2009 which received a Grammy nomination for contemporary world music in 2011. In 2024, she released her latest album Triveni, for which she won her first Grammy for Best New Age, Ambient or Chant Album at the age of 70.

== Early life ==
Chandrika Tandon was born into a conservative Tamil family in Chennai alongside her sister, Indra Nooyi, and brother. Her mother was a musician while her father was a state banker. As the first daughter in the family, Tandon was to be arranged to marry at eighteen, however, influenced by her grandfather, she pursued a higher education at Madras Christian College. When her mother initially refused to let her attend, Tandon went on a hunger strike for almost two days before her mother was convinced by the headmistress of Tandon’s convent school, Holy Angels Anglo Indian Higher Secondary School, to let her enroll.

After finishing her education at Madras Christian College, Chandrika Tandon initially desired to go to law school and follow the footsteps of her grandfather, who was a judge in Chennai. However, one of her professors recommended she apply to the Indian Institute of Management Ahmedabad and pursue a career in business instead. Amongst thousands of applicants, Tandon was accepted into IIM Ahmedabad as one of eight women in her class.

== Business ==
Graduating from IIM Ahmedabad in 1975, Chandrika Tandon worked as an executive for Citibank in Beirut during the Lebanese Civil War. At age twenty-four, she was offered a position at McKinsey and Company in New York City and became the first Indian-American to become partner in the company. In 1992, she formed Tandon Capital Associates and has advised clients including Chase Manhattan Corporation, Comerica, Unibanco (Brazil), Suncorp-Metway Ltd. (Australia), Fleet Financial Group, Bank of America, Rabobank and ABN Amro.

== Philanthropy ==
In 2004, Tandon started the Krishnamurthy Tandon Foundation, a private foundation located in New York City that partners with organizations in the fields of community building, arts and spirituality. After serving as a distinguished executive in residence at New York University, Tandon joined several of the university’s board of trustees and donated $100 million to the NYU Polytechnic School of Engineering which was renamed NYU Tandon School of Engineering. She also made several contributions to her alma mater, Madras Christian College and founded the Boyd-Tandon School of Business of which she is the advisory council chairman.

In January 2026, the formation of the Krishnamurthy Tandon School of Artificial Intelligence at IIM Ahmedabad was announced. Rooted in IIMA’s legacy of leadership, governance, and institution-building, the school will shape how AI is conceived, deployed, and governed. Bridging global AI advances with Indian data, contexts, and institutions, it will generate knowledge that is both locally transformative and globally relevant.

Since 2009, the Krishnamurthy Tandon Foundation has donated to several organizations including: the American India Foundation, Art of Living Foundation, World Music Institute, Lincoln Center, Teach for America, Yale University, Berklee College of Music, American Academy of Arts and Sciences, and New York University.

== Music ==
=== Albums ===
For her father-in-law’s 90th birthday, Tandon created a studio recording of his favorite chants as a gift. This inspired her first full-length studio album, Soul Call in 2009, a continuous recitation of the mantra's eight phonemes: Om Namo Narayanaya. The album was later nominated for Best Contemporary World Music Album for the 53rd Annual Grammy Awards in 2011.

Tandon followed up her nomination with her second studio album: Soul March in 2013, which was inspired by Mahatma Gandhi's peaceful Salt March in 1930. Classical Hindustani music with aspects of Latin and jazz, it featured over 75 musicians and was recorded in the United States and India.

In 2014, Tandon released her third studio album: Soul Mantra, featuring the chant Om Namah Shivaya in nine ragas.

Three years later in 2017, Tandon released her fourth studio album: Shivoham - The Quest which merged Sanskrit prayer with verses in English. Recorded in nine studios across four continents, Tandon states that Shivoham - The Quest is “a musical expression of my intensely personal journey over the last 20 years.”

In 2023, Tandon released her fifth studio album titled: Ammu’s Treasures, a three-volume collection of songs inspired by her grandchildren in different genres and languages. The album features 17 musicians including Béla Fleck, Romero Lubambo, Kenny Werner, Maeve Gilchrist, Jamey Haddad, Cyro Baptista, Eugene Friesen, Bobby Keyes, among others and won a Gold Medal in Children's Music at the Global Music Awards in 2023.

In 2025, Tandon released her sixth and latest studio album titled Triveni, a collaboration between South African flutist Wouter Kellerman and Japanese cellist Eru Matsumoto. Triveni won a 2025 Grammy award for Best New Age, Ambient, or Chant album.

=== Involvement with Multiple Choirs ===
Tandon has worked with choral groups of all sizes, ages, skill levels, and backgrounds from around the world. For many years, she led a senior community choir in Queens, creating Western choral pieces for its untrained singers.

She has worked extensively with the award-winning Young People’s Chorus of New York City (YPC) and was named their 2024 to 2026 Artist-in-Residence. Receiving a grant from the New York State Council on the Arts, she will work with YPC to create an original work titled Soul Harmony, drawing inspiration from ancient Sanskrit texts and other mystical traditions with eastern and western orchestration.

=== Select Performances ===
Tandon has conducted numerous benefit concerts on world stages to sold-out audiences, including the John F. Kennedy Center for the Performing Arts, Lincoln Center, Olympiastadion, Lobkowicz Palace, and in the National Mall for the World Culture Festival.

== Awards and honors ==
Award name	Given By	Year	Ref.
The Grammy Award for Best New Age, Ambient, or Chant Album	The Recording Academy	2025	
Game Changer Award	The Denyce Graves Foundation	2025	
Champion Award	ASCAP Foundation	2025	
Voice Education Research Awareness Award	The Voice Foundation	2025	
Music for Healing Award	South Asian Council for Social Services	2025	
Ban-Ki Moon Award for Women’s Empowerment	Asia Initiatives	2024	
Woman of the Year Award	Diwali at Time's Square	2024	
Maharishi Award for the Area of Celebrations and Fulfillment	Maharishi International University	2024	
Friend of the Arts Award	The Town Hall	2023	
Ellis Island Medal of Honor	Ellis Island Honors Society	2023	
Inductee	American Academy of Arts & Sciences	2020	
Horatio Alger Award	Horatio Alger Association of Distinguished Americans	2019	
BCA Leadership Award	Americans for the Arts	2018	
Lifetime of Service Award	David Lynch Foundation	2018	
Lotus Award	Children's Hope India	2017	
Gallatin Medal	New York University	2016	
Polytechnic Medal	NYU Tandon	2016	
Inaugural Distinguished Alumnus	Madras Christian College	2013	
Inaugural Distinguished Alumnus	Indian Institute of Management, Ahmedabad	2011	
Sterling Fellow Honor	Yale University	2010	
Harold Acton Society Inductee	New York University	2010	
Walter Nichols Medal for Integrity, Enterprise, and Service	NYU Stern	2009	

== Music Awards ==
Year	Association	Category	Project	Result	Ref.
2011	The Recording Academy	Best Contemporary World Music Album	Soul Call	Nominated	
2023	Parents' Picks Awards	Best Preschool Product	Ammu's Treasures	Won	
2023	Global Music Awards	Gold Medal in Children’s Music	Ammu's Treasures	Won	
2025	The Recording Academy	Best New Age, Ambient or Chant Album	Triveni	Won	

== Discography ==
Release name	Release date
Soul Ecstasy	28 August 2025
Triveni	30 August 2024
Ammu's Treasures	7 September 2023
Shivoham – The Quest	15 September 2017
Soul Mantra	2014
Soul March	2013
Soul Call	2009
