= The Da Vinci Code (soundtrack) =

Film score by Hans Zimmer
- Released: May 9, 2006
- Genre: Soundtrack
- Length: 67:58
- Label: Decca 985 4041

Hans Zimmer chronology
Batman Begins (2005)	The Da Vinci Code (2006)	Pirates of the Caribbean: Dead Man's Chest (2006)

Robert Langdon chronology
The Da Vinci Code (2006)	Angels & Demons (2008)

The official motion picture soundtrack for The Da Vinci Code with Thomas Bowes (violinist), King's Consort Choir, Hugh Marsh, Orchestra, Richard Harvey, Hila Plitmann, Martin Tillman was released on May 9, 2006 via Decca label. The film's music was composed and arranged by Hans Zimmer, whose work resulted in a nomination for the 2007 Golden Globe Award for Best Original Score.

== Style ==
Like Media Ventures protégé Harry Gregson-Williams, who composed the soundtrack for The Lion, the Witch and the Wardrobe, Zimmer used Abbey Road Studios to help create his music for The Da Vinci Code. Additional sections were recorded at London's AIR Studios, atop Rosslyn Hill.

Director Ron Howard commented that "Like every other facet of this movie, the score for The Da Vinci Code demanded a range of textures that recognized and reinforced the layers of ideas and emotion, which unfold as the basic story does." Claiming that Zimmer was "inspired", Howard added that "Hans Zimmer has given us extraordinarily memorable music to appreciate within the framework of a film or completely on its own, where you can let the sounds carry you on your own private journey."

== Track listing ==
#	Title	Length	Key Scenes / Notes
1	Dies Mercurii I Martius	6:03	The first part is played at the beginning of the film, the second part is played when Sophie talks about Saunière in front of his body at the Louvre, and the last part is played at the final confrontation with Sir Leigh Teabing, including Robert Langdon seeing all history before his eyes and him throwing the cryptex in the air.
2	L'Esprit des Gabriel	2:48	This piece is entirely played during the moment when Robert Langdon explained to Sophie Neveu at Bois de Bologne about the Priory of Sion, the Knights Templar & their involvement in history.
3	The Paschal Spiral	2:49	This piece is played when Silas calls the Teacher and tortures himself through discipline.
4	Fructus Gravis	2:50	The first part is played mainly during the acquisition of the cryptex at the Depository Bank of Zurich, while the second part is played when Langdon and Sophie break the code on The Mona Lisa then escape. It is also played at the end of the film.
5	Ad Arcana	6:07	Played while Sir Leigh Teabing decodes for Sohpie Neveu the secrets of Leonardo Da Vinci's "The Last Supper", and explains to her the Holy Grail's true nature and identity: Mary Magdalene.
6	Malleus Maleficarum	2:19	Named after the infamous book published by the Catholic Inquisition, this piece is played when Sir Leigh explains to Sophie Mary Magdalene's role as the mother of Jesus Christ's child, and how free-thinking women who threatened the church's control were hunted, tortured, and killed in medieval times.
7	Salvete Virgines	3:14	Not played in the film.
8	Daniel's 9th Cipher	9:31	This piece is played at the Rosslyn Chapel, a resting place of the Holy Grail, when the duo decipher the last code, discover the truth behind Sophie's lineage, and Sophie is reunited with her family.
9	Poisoned Chalice	6:19	First part of the film suite.
10	The Citrine Cross	5:22	Second part of the film suite. A variation on the music which plays during the gun fight between Silas and police at the Opus Dei house in London.
11	Rose of Arimathea	8:11	Third part of the film suite. The first half is played when Silas recalls his dark memories at the doors of Eglise Saint-Sulpice, while the second half is played when Sophie remembers her memories with her grandfather, Jacques Saunière.
12	Beneath Alrischa	4:23	Fourth part of the film suite. This theme is often played when the characters are endangered, hunted, or being chased.
13	Chevaliers de Sangreal	4:07	Finale of the film suite and the main theme. This piece is played at the end of the film when Langdon realizes the duality of the cryptex's map, and discovers the current location of the Grail, Mary Magdalene's final resting place, beneath La Pyramide Inversée)
14	Kyrie for the Magdalene	3:55	This piece is played when Robert and Sophie arrive at Westminster Abbey, and the setting flashes back to the funeral of Sir Isaac Newton. Written by Richard Harvey

== Personnel ==
- Arranged By [Latin Lyrics And Choir Arrangements] – Graham Preskett
- Arranged By [Score] - Henry Jackman, Lorne Balfe, Nick Glennie-Smith
- Compiled By [Soundtrack Album] – Mark Wherry
- Composed By [Ambient Music Designer] – Mel Wesson
- Composed By, Arranged By, Producer – Hans Zimmer
- Conductor [Choir] – Nick Glennie-Smith
- Conductor [Music] – Richard Harvey (2)
- Creative Director – Pat Barry (3)
- Design – Frank Famularo
- Edited By [Music] – Simon Changer
- Engineer [Air Studios Assistant Engineer] – Chris Barrett, Jake Jackson
- Executive-Producer [Executive Album Producer] – Brian Grazer, John Calley
- Mastered By [Album] – Louie Teran
- Mixed By [Album] – Alan Meyerson
- Mixed By [Music] – Al Clay
- Producer [Music Production Services For Remote Control Productions] – Steven Kofsky
- Recorded By – Geoff Foster
- Supervised By [Spe Music Supervisor] – Bob Badami

℗ © 2006 Universal Music Classics Group, a Division of UMG Recordings. Inc.

== Critical response ==
The Da Vinci Code's director, Ron Howard, said that the soundtrack was "powerful, fresh and wonderfully effective" and most film music reviewers agreed with him. Soundtrack.Net and Scorereviews rated the score highly. The music was nominated for a 2007 Golden Globe Award for Best Original Score, losing to Alexandre Desplat's work for The Painted Veil.
