= Grammy Award for Best Classical Solo Vocal Album =

Grammy Award

Grammy Award for Best Classical Vocal Solo
- Awarded for: quality classic vocal solos
- Country: United States
- Presented by: National Academy of Recording Arts and Sciences
- First award: 1959
- Currently held by: Karen Slack (soloist); Michelle Cann (pianist) - Beyond the Years - Unpublished Songs of Florence Price (2025)
- Website: grammy.com

The Grammy Award – Best Classical Vocal Solo has been awarded since 1959. There have been several minor changes to the name of the award over this time:

- From 1959 to 1960 and from 1962 to 1964 the award was known as Best Classical Performance - Vocal Soloist (with or without orchestra)
- In 1961 it was awarded as Best Classical Performance - Vocal Soloist
- In 1965 it was awarded as Best Vocal Soloist Performance (with or without orchestra)
- In 1966, 1968 and from 1971 to 1990 it was awarded as Best Classical Vocal Soloist Performance
- In 1967 it was awarded as Best Classical Vocal Soloist Performance (with or without orchestra)
- In 1969 it was awarded as Best Vocal Soloist Performance
- In 1970 it was awarded as Best Vocal Soloist Performance, Classical
- In 1991 it was awarded as Best Classical Vocal Performance
- In 1992 it was awarded as Best Classical Vocal Soloist
- From 1993 to 2011 it returned to being awarded as Best Classical Vocal Performance
- From 2012 to 2014 it was awarded as Best Classical Vocal Solo
- From 2015 the award has been known as Best Classical Solo Vocal Album and is open for albums only (in previous years single tracks were also eligible for the award, although in most cases the awards and nominations went to albums)

Up to and including 2015, the Grammy was awarded to one or more vocal soloist(s). Accompanying musicians, orchestras and/or conductors were not eligible for the award. From 2016, "collaborative artists" (such as solo accompanists, conductors or chamber groups) have also been included. Accompanying large orchestras or multiple instrumentalists, however, remain ineligible. Producer(s) and engineer(s)/mixers of over 50% of playing time on the recording also receive an award.

Years reflect the year in which the Grammy Awards were presented, for works released in the previous year.

== Recipients ==
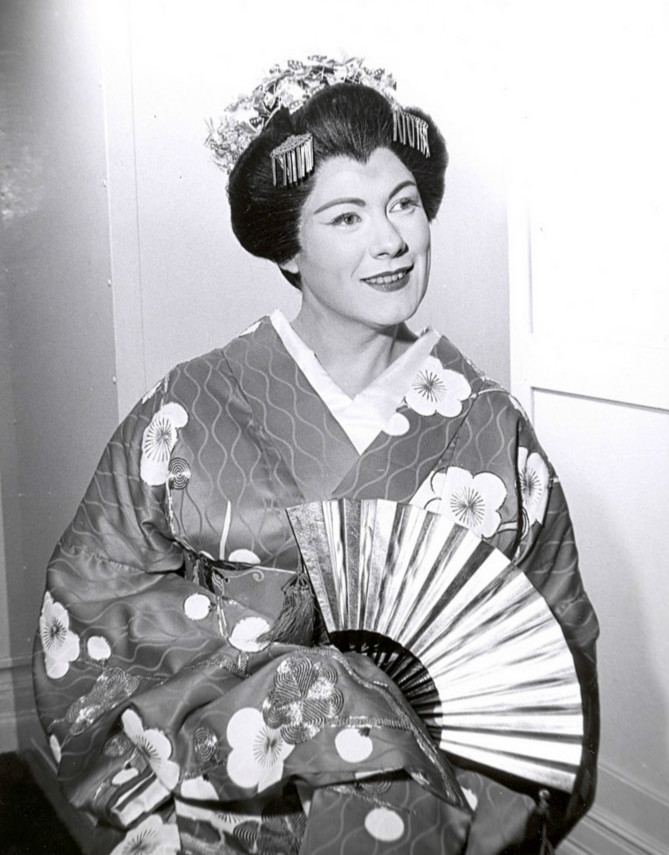
Italian soprano Renata Tebaldi was the first recipient of the award.

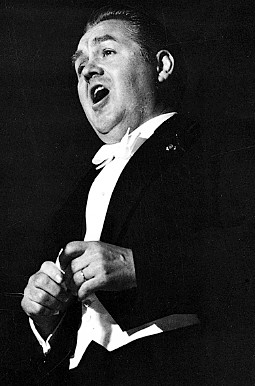
1960 winner, Jussi Björling

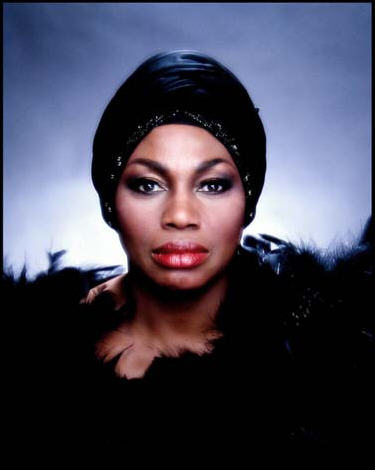
Thirteen-time winner Leontyne Price

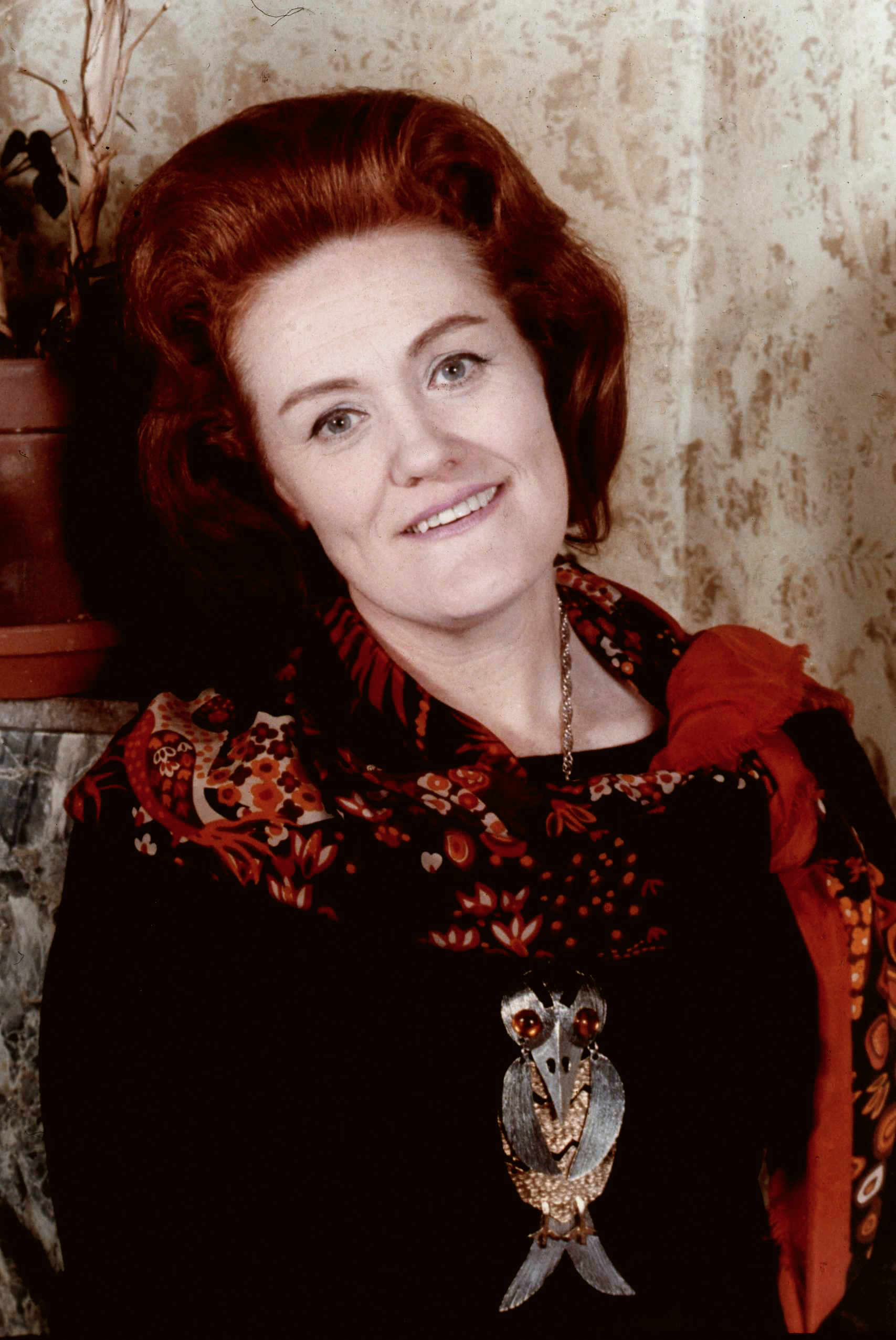
Two-time winner Joan Sutherland

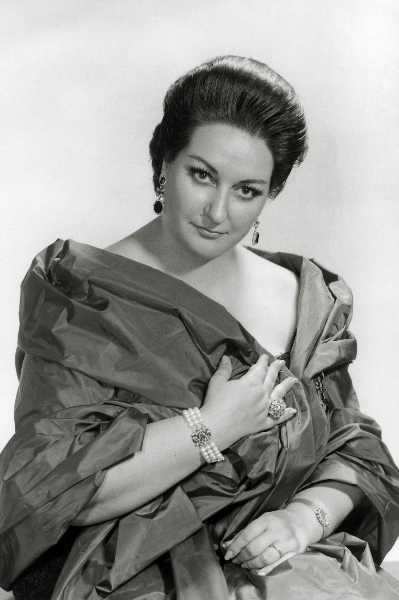
1969 winner, Montserrat Caballé

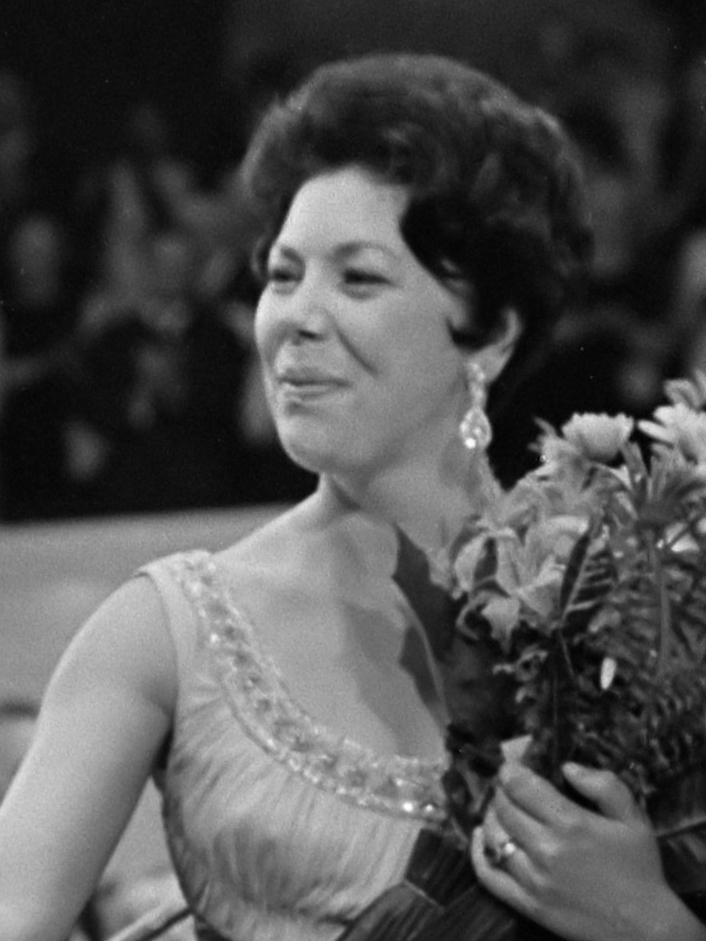
Two-time winner Janet Baker

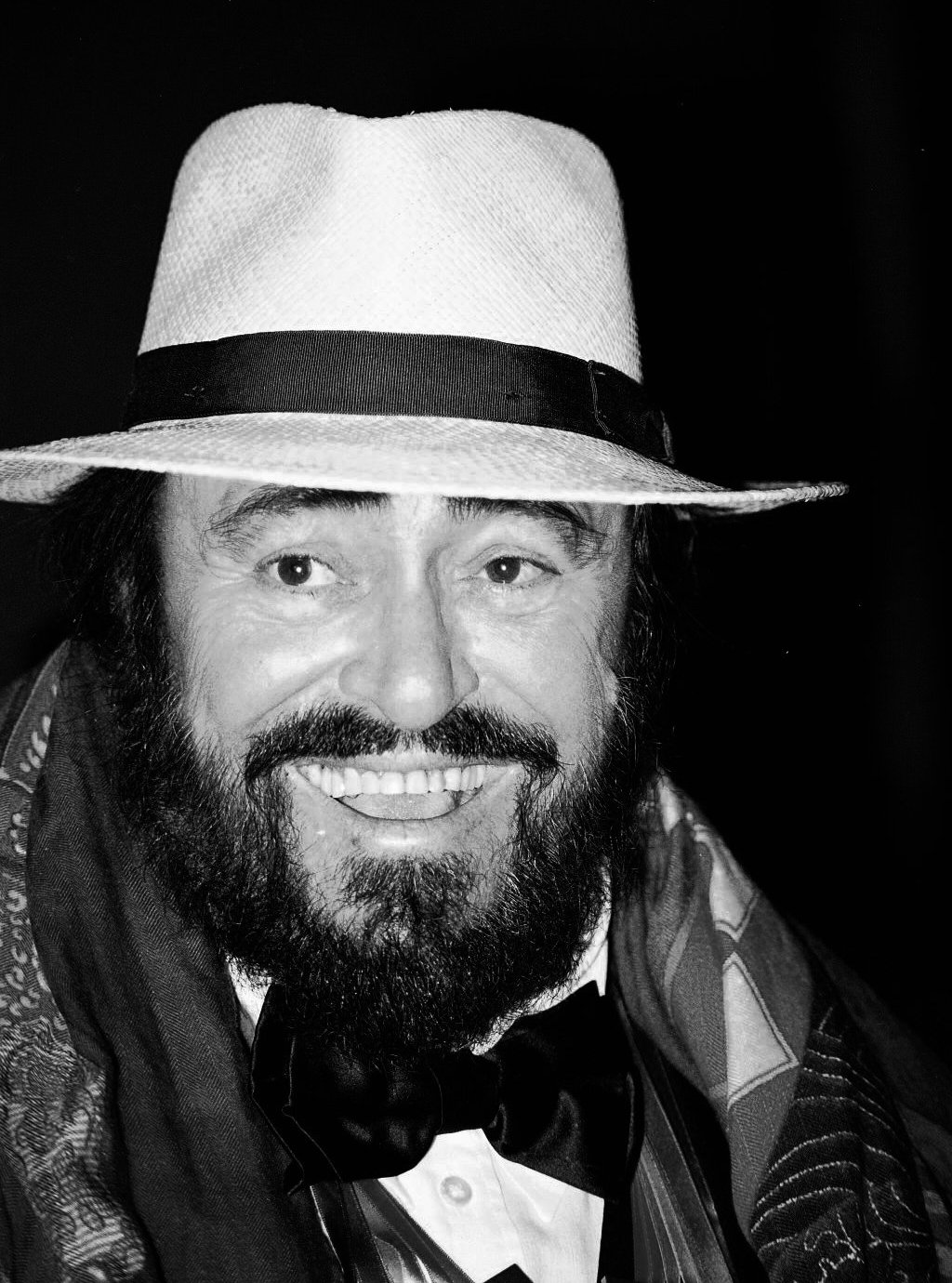
Five-time winner Luciano Pavarotti

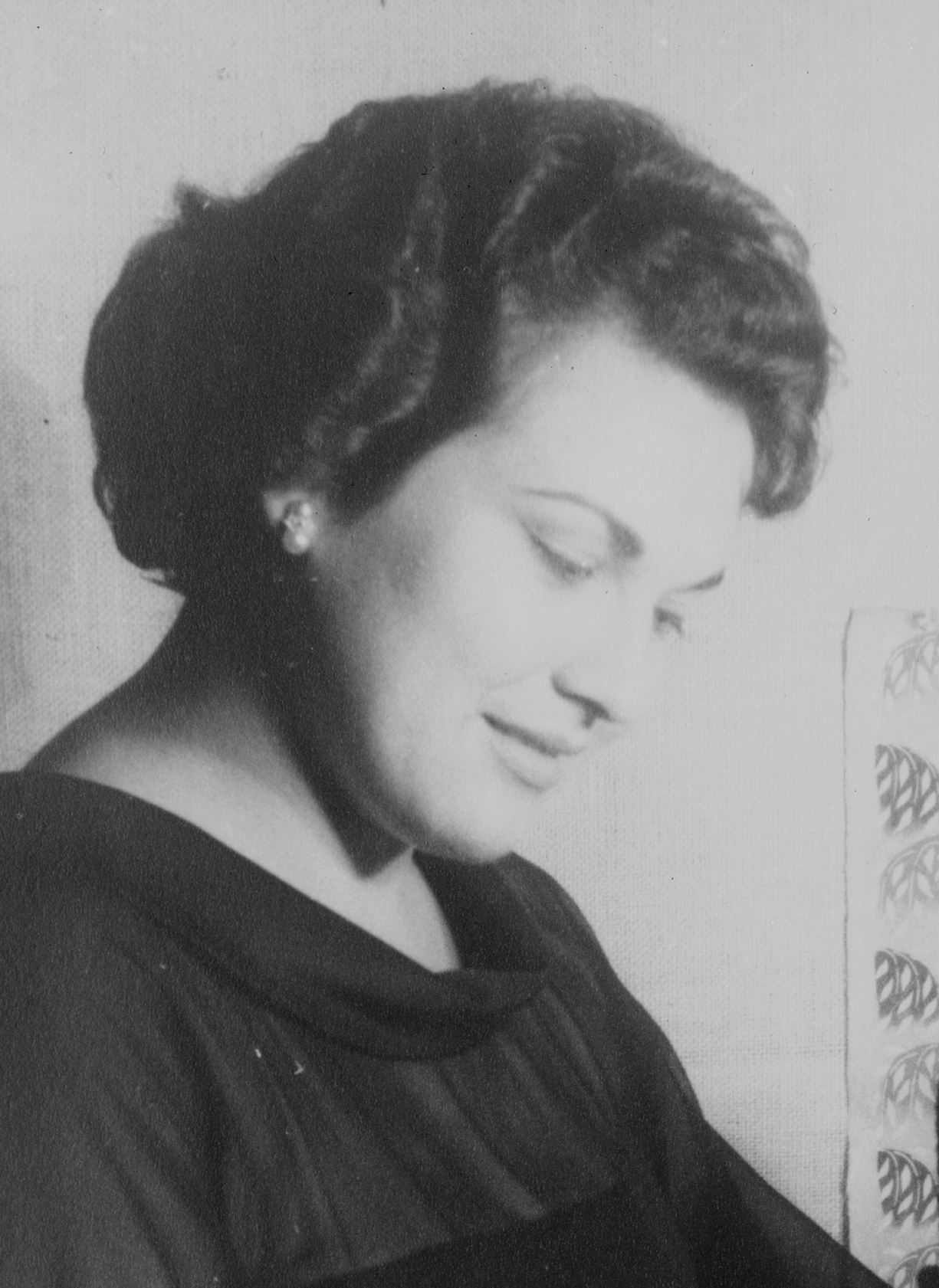
Two-time winner Marilyn Horne

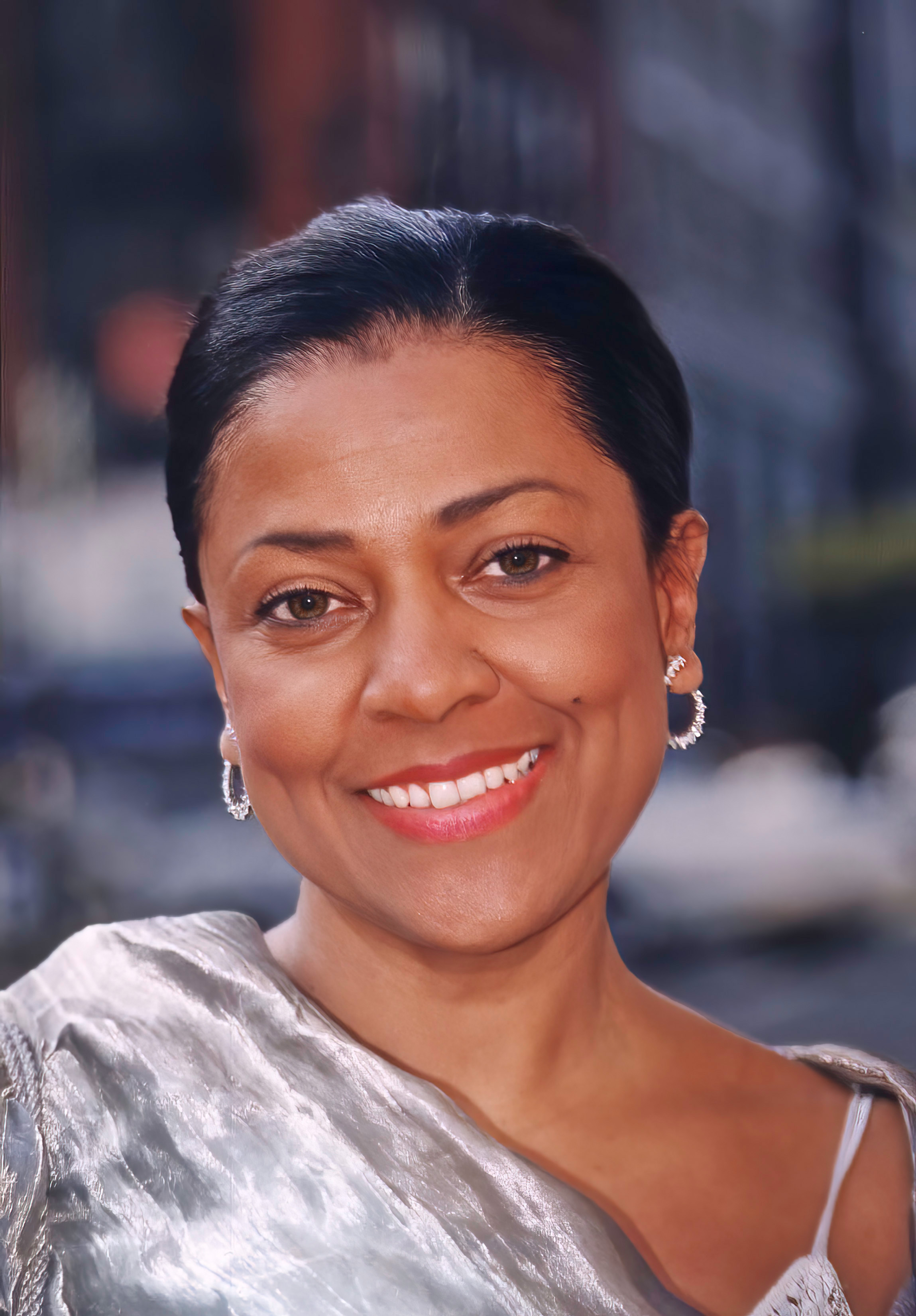
Three-time winner Kathleen Battle

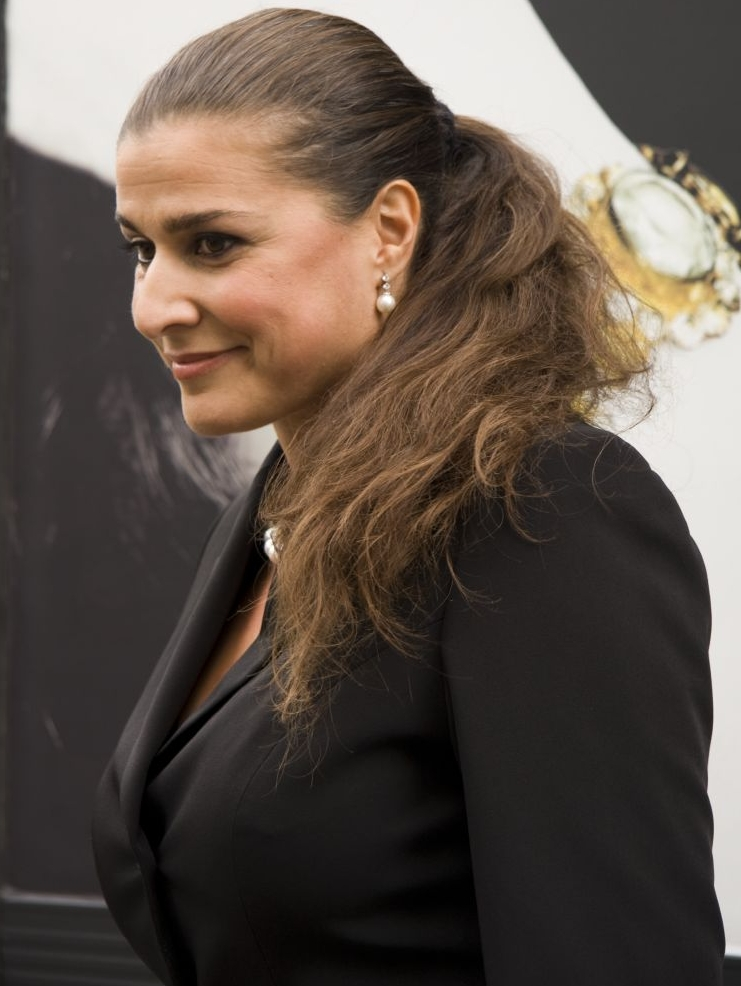
Five-time winner Cecilia Bartoli

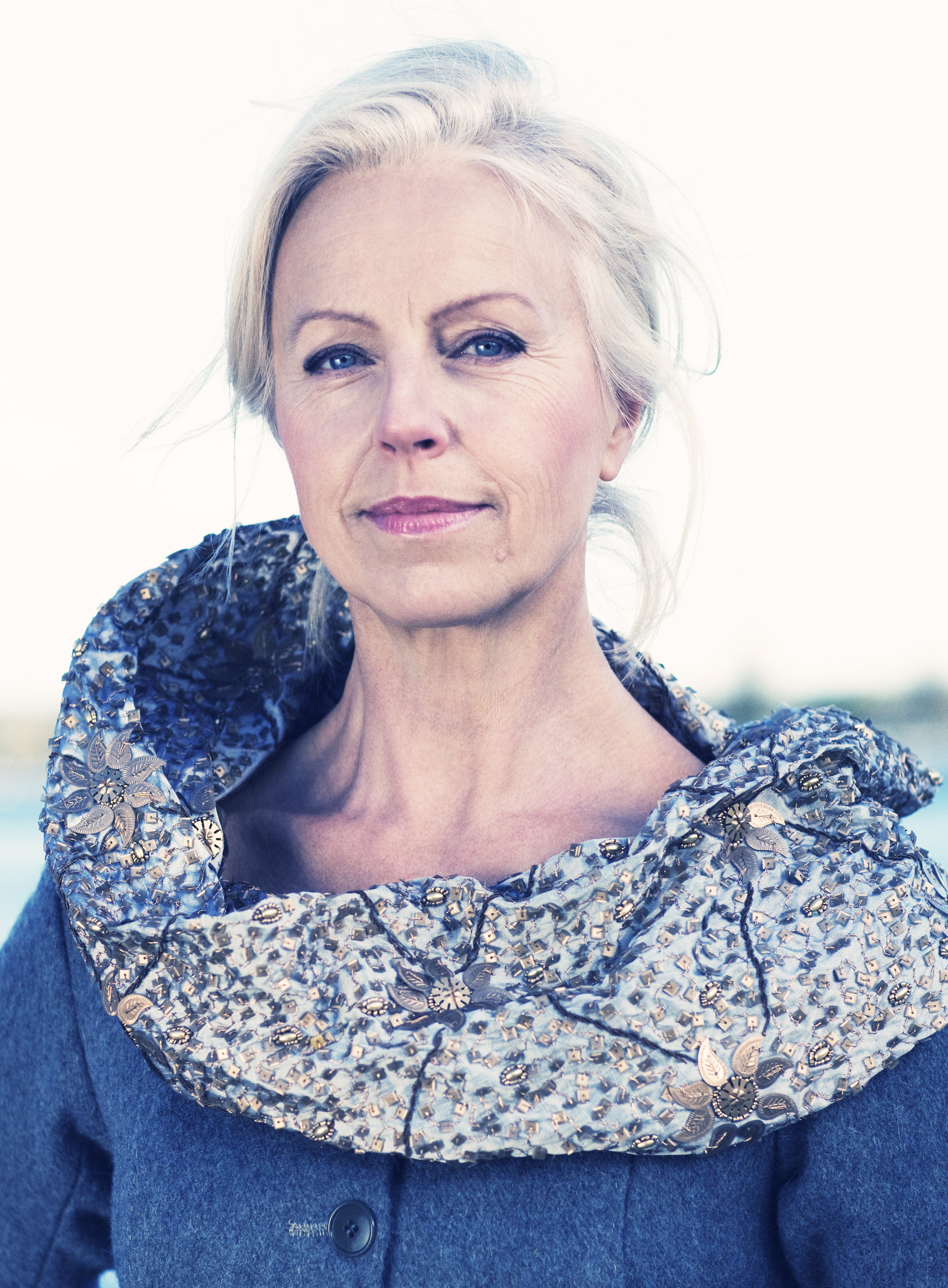
Three-time winner Anne Sofie von Otter

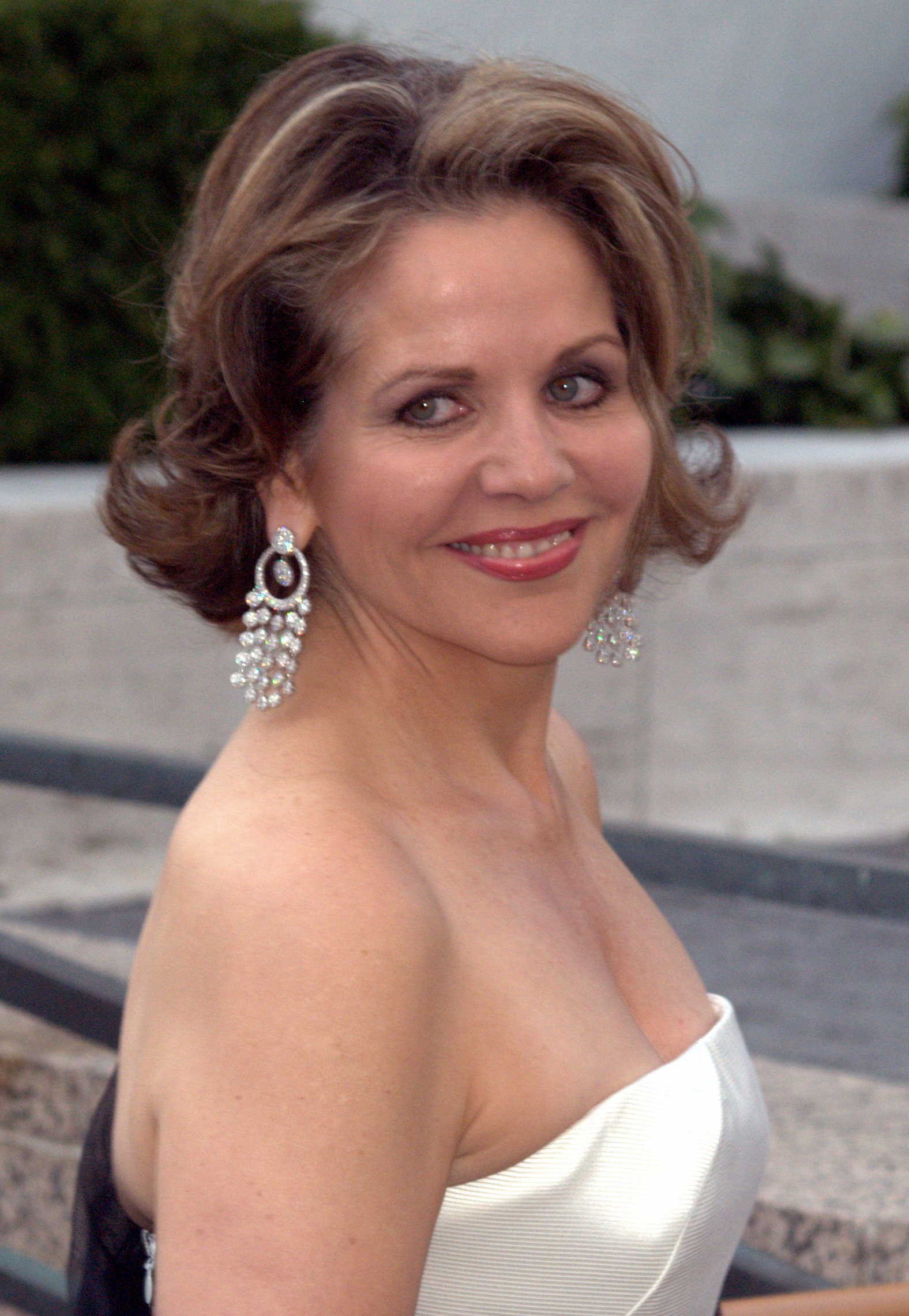
Four-time winner Renée Fleming

Year	Recipient(s)	Work	Nominees	Ref.
1959	Renata Tebaldi	Operatic Recital	Maria Callas – Cherubini: Medea; Salli Terri – Duets for Spanish Guitar; Eileen Farrell – Eileen Farrell as Medea; Eileen Farrell – Wagner: Prelude and Liebestod (Tristan and Isolde); Brünnhilde's Immolation (Götterdämmerung)	
1960	Jussi Björling	Bjoerling in Opera	Jaime Laredo – Presenting Jaime Laredo; Leonard Pennario – Pennario Plays; Nathan Milstein – Four Italian Sonatas; Laurindo Almeida – Danzas; Glenn Gould – Berg: Sonata For Piano, Op.1; Krenek: Sonata # 3, Op. 92 # 4; Schoenberg Three Piano Pieces, Op. 11	
1961	Leontyne Price	A Program of Song - Leontyne Price Recital	Eileen Farrell – Arias in Great Tradition; Peter Pears – Britten: Nocturne; Salli Terri – Conversations with the Guitar; Joan Sutherland – Handel: Arias	
1962	Joan Sutherland	The Art of the Prima Donna	Eileen Farrell –Bach: Cantasas Nos. 58 and 202 (Bach Aria Group Orchestra); Leontyne Price - Operatic Arias (Rome Opera House Orchestra); Victoria de los Angeles – The Fabulous Victoria de los Angeles; Trimble: Four Fragments from The Canterbury Tales (Conant, Russo, Orenstein)	
1963	Eileen Farrell	Götterdämmerung - Brünnhilde's Immolation Scene/Wesendonck Songs	Adele Addison – Foss: Time Cycle; Birgit Nilsson – R. Strauss: Salome; Dietrich Fischer-Dieskau – Schubert: Die Schone Mullerin; Victoria de los Angeles – Spanish Songs of the 20th Century	
1964	Leontyne Price	Great Scenes From Gershwin's Porgy and Bess	Anna Moffo – A Verdi Collaboration; Netania Davrath – Canteloube: Songs of the Auvergne, Vol. 2; Joan Sutherland – Command Performance; Maureen Forrester – 'Mahler: Des Knaben Wunderhorn	
1965	Leontyne Price	Berlioz: Nuits d'Ete (Song Cycle)/Falla: El Amor Brujo	Regine Crespin – Berlioz: Nuits d' Ete; Peter Pears – Britten: Serenade for Tenor, Horn and Strings; Maria Callas – Callas Sings Verdi; Dietrich Fischer-Dieskau – Schubert: Die Winterreise; Joan Sutherland – The Age of Bel Canto: Operatic Scenes; Boris Christoff – Tsars and Kings (Opera Arias)	
1966	Leontyne Price	Strauss: Salome (Dance of the Seven Veils, Interlude, Final Scene)/The Egyptian Helen (Awakening Scene)	Anna Moffo – Canteloube: Songs of the Auvergne; Rachmaninov: Vocalise; Villa-Lobos: Bachianas Brasileiras No. 5; Shirley Verrett – Falla: Seven Popular Spanish Songs; Mirella Freni – Mirella Freni, Operatic Arias; Galina Vishnevskaya – Mussorgsky: Songs	
1967	Leontyne Price	Prima Donna (Works of Barber, Purcell, etc.)	Judith Raskin – 'Mahler: Symphony No. 4 in G Major; Janet Baker – Mahler: The Youth's Magic Horn (Das Knaben Wunderhorn); Montserrat Caballé – Presenting Montserrat Caballe (Bellini and Donizetti arias); Dietrich Fischer-Dieskau – Schumann: Dichterliebe	
1968	Leontyne Price	Prima Donna, Volume 2	Elisabeth Schwarzkopf – An Elisabeth Schwarzkopf Songbook; Dietrich Fischer-Dieskau – Beethoven: Songs; Adele Addison – Copland: 12 Poems of Emily Dickinson; Fritz Wunderlich – Schubert: Die Schone Mullerin; Peter Pears – Schubert: Die Winterreise	
1969	Montserrat Caballé	Rossini: Rarities	Janet Baker – Mahler: Kindertotenlieder and Songs of a Wayfarer; Dietrich Fischer-Dieskau – 'Schumann: Songs; Victoria de los Angeles – Songs of Andalucia; Gerard Souzay – Songs of Poulenc; Shirley Verrett – Verrett in Opera	
1970	Leontyne Price	Barber: Two Scenes From "Antony and Cleopatra"/Knoxville, Summer of 1915	Christa Ludwig, Walter Berry – A Most Unusual Song Recital (Beethoven, Rossini, Brahms, Reger, R. Strauss); Marilyn Horne – Bach and Handel Arias (Excerpts From Magnificat, Christmas Oratorio, St. Matthew Passion, Messiah, Rodelina); Halina Lukomska – Berg: Altenberg Lieder; Sherrill Milnes – Brahms: 4 Serious Songs; Peter Pears, Dietrich Fischer-Dieskau – Britten: Holy Sonnets of Donne; Songs and Proverbs of Blake; Elisabeth Schwarzkopf, Dietrich Fischer-Dieskau – Mahler: Des Knaben Wunderhorn; Dietrich Fischer-Dieskau – Richard Strauss: Early Songs; Beverly Sills – Scenes And Arias from French Opera	
1971	Dietrich Fischer-Dieskau	Schubert: Lieder	Leontyne Price – Prima Donna, Vol. 3; Janet Baker – Death of Cleopatra final scenes, Berlioz: Les Troyens; Christa Ludwig, Walter Berry – Mahler: Des Knaben Wunderhorn; Marilyn Horn – Mahler: Kindertotenlieder; Wagner: Wesendonck Lieder	
1972	Leontyne Price	Leontyne Price Sings Robert Schumann	Janet Baker, Dietrich Fischer-Dieskau – An Evening of Duets; Cathy Berberian – Berio: Epifanie; Dietrich Fischer-Dieskau – Haydn and Mozart Arias; Evelyn Lear, Thomas Stewart – Ives: American Scenes/American Poets	
1973	Dietrich Fischer-Dieskau	Brahms: Die Schone Magelone	Leontyne Price – 5 Great Operatic Scenes (Verdi: La Traviata, Don Carlo; Tchaikovsky: Onegin; Strauss: Ariadne, etc.); Janet Baker – Elgar: Sea Pictures; Jan DeGaetani – Songs by Stephen Foster; Anna Moffo – Songs of Debussy; Birgit Nilsson – Wagner: Wesendonck Lieder	
1974	Leontyne Price	Puccini: Heroines	Heather Harper – Berg: 7 Early Songs; Cathy Berberian – Berio: Recital 1 (For Cathy); Placido Domingo – La Voce d'Oro; Yvonne Minton, Rene Kollo – Mahler: Das Lied von der Erde	
1975	Leontyne Price	Leontyne Price Sings Richard Strauss	Sherrill Milnes – Amazing Grace (Agnus Dei, Bless the Lord, O My Soul, etc.); Martina Arroyo – There's a Meeting Here Tonight; Elly Ameling – Schubert: Goethe-Lieder; Marilyn Horne – French and Spanish Songs; Julius Eastman – Davies: 8 Songs for a Mad King; Jan DeGaetani – Crumb: Night of the Four Moons	
1976	Janet Baker	Mahler: Kindertotenlieder	Joan Morris – After the Ball (A Treasury of Turn-of-the-Century Popular Songs); Victoria de los Angeles – Canteloube: Songs of the Auvergne, Album 2; Cleo Laine – Cleo Laine Sings Pierrot Lunaire and Songs by Ives; Elly Ameling – Schumann: Frauenliebe und Leben; Elisabeth Schwarzkopf – Schumann: Frauenliebe und Leben, Op. 42	
1977	Beverly Sills	Herbert: Music of Victor Herbert	Janet Baker, James King – Mahler: Das Lied von der Erde; Carlo Bergonzi – Carlo Bergonzi Sings Verdi; Jan DeGaetani – Ives: Songs; Dietrich Fischer-Dieskau – Wolfe: Morike Lieder; Marni Nixon – 9 Early Songs; The Cabaret Songs of Arnold Schoenberg; Margaret Price – Mozart: Arias (La Clemenza di Tito, Die Entfuhrung aus dem Serail, Nozze di Figaro etc); Barbra Streisand – Classical Barbra	
1978	Janet Baker	Bach: Arias	Elly Ameling – Schubert on Stage; Dietrich Fischer-Dieskau – Ives: Songs; Donald Gramm – But Yesterday Is Not Today (songs by Barber, Bowles, Copland, Chanler, etc.); Luciano Pavarotti – O Holy Night (O Holy Night, Sanctus, Ave Maria, etc); Elisabeth Söderström – Rachmaninov: Songs, Vol. 2; Gérard Souzay – Faure: Songs; Galina Vishnevskaya – Shostakovich: Symphony No. 14; Frederica von Stade – Rossini/Mozart: Opera Arias	
1979	Luciano Pavarotti	Luciano Pavarotti - Hits From Lincoln Center	Teresa Berganza – Favorite Zarzuela Arias; Maria Callas – The Legend: The Unreleased Recordings; Dietrich Fischer-Dieskau – Wagner: Arias; Marilyn Horne – Ravel: Sheherazade; Christa Ludwig – Brahms: Spring Rhapsody; Galina Vishnevskaya – Mussorgsky: Songs and Dances of Death	
1980	Luciano Pavarotti	O Sole Mio - Favorite Neapolitan Songs	Elly Ameling – Mozart: Lieder; Jan DeGaetani – Ravel: Chansons Madecasses; Victoria de los Ángeles – Victoria de los Angeles in Concert; Dietrich Fischer-Dieskau – Schubert: Lieder; Yevgeny Nesterenko – Mussorgsky: Songs; Leontyne Price – Lieder by Schubert and Richard Strauss; Frederica von Stade – Frederica von Stade Song Recital	
1981	Leontyne Price	Prima Donna, Vol. 5 - Great Soprano Arias From Handel to Britten	Elly Ameling – Mozart: Songs; Judith Blegen – Berg: Lulu Suite; Jessye Norman – Berg: Der Wein, Concert Aria; Kiri Te Kanawa – R. Strauss: 4 Last Songs and Orchestral Songs; Frederica von Stade – Mahler: Songs of a Wayfarer and Ruckert Songs	
1982	Marilyn Horne, Luciano Pavarotti, Joan Sutherland	Live From Lincoln Center - Sutherland/Horne/Pavarotti	Elly Ameling – Think on Me; Barbara Hendricks – Del Tredici: Final Alice; Teresa Stratas – The Unknown Kurt Weill; Frederica von Stade – Ravel: Sheherazade	
1983	Leontyne Price	Verdi: Arias (Leontyne Price Sings Verdi)	Elly Ameling – Faure: La Bonne Chanson; Debussy: Chansons de Bilitis and Ariettes Oubliees; Jessye Norman – Berlioz: La Mort de Cleopatre; Kiri Te Kanawa – Mozart: Concert Arias (Andromeda, Il Burbero di Buon Core, Artaserse, Idomeneo, Cerere Placata); Frederica von Stade – Frederica von Stade Live!	
1984	Marilyn Horne and Leontyne Price	Leontyne Price & Marilyn Horne in Concert at the Met	Dietrich Fischer-Dieskau – The Brahms Edition: Lieder; Jessye Norman – The Brahms Edition: Lieder; Kiri Te Kanawa – Mozart Opera Arias; Frederica von Stade – Faure: 18 Songs	
1985	Heather Harper, Jessye Norman & José van Dam	Ravel: Songs of Maurice Ravel	Janet Baker – Mahler's Songs of Youth; Kathleen Battle, Håkan Hagegård – Brahms: A German Requiem; Jessye Norman – Mahler: Symphony No. 2 in C Minor (Resurrection); Kiri Te Kanawa – Mahler: Symphony No. 4 in G Major, 4th Movement	
1986	John Aler	Berlioz: Requiem	Elly Ameling – Belioz: Les Nuits d'Ete; Plácido Domingo, Pilar Lorengar – Zarzuela Arias and Duets; Marilyn Horne – Marilyn Horne Sings (Offenbach, Cherubini, Saint-Saëns, etc.); Kiri Te Kanawa – Canteloube: Chants 'Auvergne, Vol. 2; Villa-Lobos: Bachianas Brasileiras No. 5; Frederica von Stade for Berlioz: Les Nuits d'été; Debussy: La Damoiselle élue	
1987	Kathleen Battle	Kathleen Battle Sings Mozart	Marilyn Horne – Beautiful Dreamer: The Great American Song Book; Luciano Pavarotti – Passione Pavarotti (Favorite Neapolitan Love Songs); Teresa Stratas – Stratas Sings Weill; Frederica von Stade – Canteloube: Chants d'Auvergne Vol. II/Triptyque	
1988	Kathleen Battle	Kathleen Battle - Salzburg Recital	Elly Ameling – Soiree Francaise (Debussy, Faure, Poulenc, Franck, Canteloube, Roussel, Chausson, Messiaen, etc.); Arleen Auger – Villa-Lobos: Bachianas Brasileiras No. 5 for Soprano and Orchestra of Violoncellos; Marni Nixon – Copland: 8 Poems of Emily Dickinson; Jessye Norman – R. Strauss: Lieder (Including Malven)	
1989	Luciano Pavarotti	Luciano Pavarotti in Concert	Arleen Auger – Love Songs (Copland, R. Strauss, Poulenc, Mahler, Schumann, Gounod, Schubert); Jan DeGaetani – Songs of America; Christa Ludwig – Schubert: Winterreise; Jessye Norman – Handel, Schubert, Schumann: Lieder (Jessye Norman - Live at Hohenems)	
1990	Dawn Upshaw	Knoxville - Summer of 1915 (Music of Barber, Menotti, Harbison, Stravinsky)	Kathleen Battle – Schubert: Lieder; Kathleen Battle and Plácido Domingo – Live in Tokyo 1988; Plácido Domingo – Puccini: The Unknown Puccini; William Sharp – William Sharp	
1991	José Carreras, Plácido Domingo, Luciano Pavarotti	Carreras, Domingo, Pavarotti in Concert	Elly Ameling – Schubert: The Complete Songs, Vol. 7; Jan DeGaetani – Berlioz: Les Nuits d Ete, Op. 7; Mahler: 5 Wunderhorn Songs and 5 Ruckert Songs; Thomas Hampson – Songs from Des Knaben Wunderhorn (Mahler, Brahms, Schumann, Loewe, Strauss, Zemlinsky, von Weber); Sanford Sylvan – Adams: The Wound-Dresser	
1992	Dawn Upshaw	The Girl With Orange Lips (Falla, Ravel, etc.)	Jan DeGaetani – Jan DeGaetani in Concert, Vol. 2 (Brahms, Schumann, etc.); Thomas Hampson – Mahler: Songs of a Wayfarer; 5 Ruckert Lieder; Samuel Ramey – Copland: Old American Songs; Ives: Songs; Cheryl Studer – Mozart: Arias; Sanford Sylvan – Beloved That Pilgrimage: Songs of Copland, Barber, Chanler	
1993	Kathleen Battle & Margo Garrett	Kathleen Battle at Carnegie Hall (Handel, Mozart, Liszt, Strauss, etc.)	Arleen Auger – Wolf: Songs to the Poetry of Goethe and Morike; Cecilia Bartoli – Cecilia Bartoli: Rossini Heroines; Thomas Hampson – Delius: Sea Drift; Marilyn Horne – Marilyn Horne: Rossini Recital	
1994	Arleen Auger	The Art of Arleen Auger (Works of Larsen, Purcell, Schumann, Mozart)	Gabriela Beňačková – Dvořák, Janáček, Martinu: Lieder; Christa Ludwig – Farewell to Salzburg (Works of Brahms, Mahler, Schumann, Strauss); Sylvia McNair – Exsultate Jubilate (Works of Handel, Mozart); Anne Sofie von Otter – Grieg: Lieder	
1995	Cecilia Bartoli	The Impatient Lover - Italian Songs by Beethoven, Schubert, Mozart	Dmitri Hvorostovsky – Songs and Dances of Death (Works of Mussorgsky, Rimsky-Korsakoff, Borodin, etc.); Peter Schreier – Mendelssohn: Lieder (Der Mond; Reiselied, etc.); Bryn Terfel – An Die Musik - Favorite Schubert Songs (Die Forelle; An Die Leier, etc.); Anne Sofie von Otter – Love's Twilight - Late Romantic Songs by Berg, Korngold, R. Strauss	
1996	Sylvia McNair	The Echoing Air - The Music of Henry Purcell	Roberto Alagna – Roberto Alagna - Operatic Arias (Works of Donizetti, Massenet, etc.); Wolfgang Holzmair – Schumann: Dichterliebe; Liederkreis, Op. 24; Heine Lieder; Sergei Leiferkus – Mussorgsky Songs (Songs and Dances of Death, The Nursery, etc); Bryn Terfel – The Vagabond (Songs by Vaughan Williams, Butterworth, etc.)	
1997	Bryn Terfel	Opera Arias - Works of Mozart, Wagner, Borodin	Renee Fleming – Visions of Love - A Collection of Mozart Arias; Lorraine Hunt – Phaedra from Britten: The Rescue of Penelope; Phaedra; Jennifer Larmore – Where Shall I Fly - Handel & Mozart Arias; Sanford Sylvan – Faure: L'Horizon Chimerique; Anne Sofie von Otter – Wings in the Night - Swedish Songs	
1998	Cecilia Bartoli	An Italian Songbook (Works of Bellini, Donizetti, Rossini)	Omar Ebrahim, Rosemary Hardy, Phyllis Bryn-Julson, Rose Taylor – Ligeti: Vocal Works; Renee Fleming – Signatures - Great Opera Scenes; Vesselina Kasarova – Mozart: Arias; Anne Sofie von Otter – La Bonne Chanson - Faure Chamber Songs	
1999	Renée Fleming	The Beautiful Voice (Works of Charpentier, Gounod etc.)	Matthias Goerne – Schumann: Dichterliebe, Op. 48; Liederkreis, Op. 24; Håkan Hagegård – Hagegard Sings Brahms, Sibelius, Stenhammar; Jennifer Larmore – Amore Per Rossini; Bryn Terfel – Handel Arias	
2000	Anne Sofie von Otter & Thomas Quasthoff	Mahler: Des Knaben Wunderhorn	David Daniels – Handel: Operatic Arias; Matthias Goerne – Eisler: The Hollywood Songbook; Ben Heppner – German Romantic Opera; Thomas Quasthoff – Schubert: Winterreise	
2001	Cecilia Bartoli (artist), Jonathan Stokes (engineer), Christopher Raeburn (producer)	The Vivaldi Album (Dell'aura al sussurrar; Alma oppressa, etc.)	María Bayo – Handel: Opera Arias & Cantatas; Matthias Goerne – Bach: Cantatas BWV 82, 158 & 56; Thomas Quasthoff – Brahms/Liszt: Lieder; Anne Sofie von Otter – Folksongs	
2002	Cecilia Bartoli (artist), Jonathan Stokes (engineer), Christopher Raeburn (producer)	Dreams & Fables - Gluck Italian Arias (Tremo Gra' Fubbi Miei; Die Questa Cetra In Seno, etc.)	Barbara Bonney – Fairest Isle (Dowland, Campion, Morley, Etc.); Ian Bostridge – Henze: Six Songs From The Arabian; Three Auden Songs; Thomas Quasthoff – Schubert: Schwanengesang/Brahms: Vier Ernste Gesänge; Anne Sofie von Otter – Beethoven/Meyerbeer/Spohr: Lieder - Mélodies	
2003	Renée Fleming (artist), Jonathan Stokes, Neil Hutchinson & Tom Lazarus (engineers), Erik Smith (producer)	Bel Canto (Bellini, Donizetti, Rossini, etc.)	Vivica Genaux – Arias for Farinelli (Porpora, Hasse, Broschi, Etc.); Susan Narucki – Carter: Tempo E Tempi; Christine Schäfer – Boulez: Pli Selon Pli; Anne Sofie von Otter – Chaminade: Melodies - Mots D'Amour	
2004	Thomas Quasthoff & Anne Sofie von Otter (soloists), Jürgen Bulgrin & Oliver Rogalla Von Heyden (engineers), Christopher Alder (producer)	Schubert: Lieder with Orchestra	Barbara Bonney – Im Chambre Separee - The Operetta Album; Ian Bostridge, David Daniels, and Christopher Maltman – Britten: The Canticles; Montserrat Caballé – Songs of the Spanish Renaissance, Vol. 1; Frederica von Stade – Argento: Casa Guidi	
2005	Susan Graham	Ives: Songs (The Things Our Fathers Loved; the Housatonic at Stockbridge, etc.)	Angela Maria Blasi and Stella Doufexis – Marx: Orchestral Songs (Songs for High & Middle Voice; Verklartes Jahr); Lorraine Hunt Lieberson – Handel: Arias (Theodora; La Lucrezia-Cantata; Serse); Karita Mattila – Grieg and Sibelius Songs; Thomas Quasthoff – A Romantic Songbook (Strauss, Schumann, Schubert, Mendelssohn, etc)	
2006	Thomas Quasthoff (soloist), Jürgen Bulgrin & Rainer Maillard (engineers), Christopher Alder (producer)	Bach: Cantatas	Cecilia Bartoli – Opera Proibita; Natalie Dessay – Strauss: Amor; Carole Farley – Bolcom: Songs; Rolando Villazón – Gounod -- Massenet: Arias	
2007	Lorraine Hunt Lieberson	Rilke Songs	Ian Bostridge – Britten: Song Cycles; Bernarda Fink and Marcos Fink – Canciones Argentinas; Patrick Mason – Songs of Amy Beach; Thomas Quasthoff – Consider, My Soul	
2008	Lorraine Hunt Lieberson (soloist), John Newton & Mark Donahue (engineers), Dirk Sobotka (producer)	Lorraine Hunt Lieberson Sings Peter Lieberson: Neruda Songs	Sarah Connolly – Sea Pictures; Renée Fleming – Homage: The Age of the Diva; Anna Netrebko – Russian Album; Rolando Villazón – Gitano: Zarzuela Arias	
2009	Hila Plitmann (soloist), John Corigliano, Tim Handley & Tom Lazarus (engineers), John Corigliano & Tim Handley (producers)	Corigliano: Mr. Tambourine Man: Seven Poems of Bob Dylan	Cecilia Bartoli – Maria; Isabel Bayrakdarian – Gomidas Songs; Sanford Sylvan – Charles Fussell: Wilde; Anne Sofie von Otter – Terezín: Theresienstadt	
2010	Renee Fleming	Verismo	Anne Sofie von Otter – Bach; Juan Diego Flórez – Bel Canto Spectacular; Lorraine Hunt Lieberson – Recital At Ravinia; Susan Graham – Un Frisson Français	
2011	Cecilia Bartoli	Sacrificium	Anne Sofie von Otter – Ombre de Mon Amant – French Baroque Arias; Lucia Duchonová – Turina: Canto A Sevilla; Vivica Genaux – Vivaldi: Opera Arias – Pyrotechnics; Measha Brueggergosman – Wagner: Wesendonck-Lieder	
2012	Joyce DiDonato	Diva Divo	Marianne Beate Kielland – Grieg/Thommesen: Veslemoy Synsk; Natalie Dessay – Handel: Cleopatra; Andreas Scholl – Purcell: O Solitude; Ian Bostridge – Three Baroque Tenors	
2013	Renee Fleming	Poèmes	Natalie Dessay – Debussy: Clair de Lune; Joyce DiDonato – Homecoming - Kansas City Symphony Presents Joyce DiDonato; Ute Lemper – Paris Days, Berlin Nights; Anne Sofie von Otter – Sogno Barocco	
2014	Dawn Upshaw	Winter Morning Walks	Joyce DiDonato – Drama Queens; Cecilia Bartoli – Mission; Christoph Prégardien – Schubert: Winterreise; Jonas Kaufmann – Wagner	
2015	Anne Sofie von Otter	Douce France	Philippe Jaroussky – Porpora: Arias; Florian Boesch – Schubert: Die Schöne Müllerin; Joyce DiDonato – Stella di Napoli; Lawrence Brownlee – Virtuoso Rossini Arias	
2016	Joyce DiDonato (soloist), Antonio Pappano (accompanist)	Joyce & Tony - Live From Wigmore Hall	Mark Padmore (soloist), Kristian Bezuidenhout (accompanist) – Beethoven: An Die Ferne Geliebte; Haydn: English Songs; Mozart: Masonic Cantata; Jonas Kaufman (soloist), Antonio Pappano (conductor) – Nessun Dorma - The Puccini Album; Talise Trevigne (soloist), David Alan Miller (conductor) – Rouse: Seeing; Kabir Padavali; Cecilia Bartoli (soloist), Diego Fasolis (conductor) – St. Petersburg	
2017	Dorothea Röschmann (soloist), Mitsuko Uchida (accompanist)	Schumann & Berg	Magdalena Kožená (soloist), Andrea Marcon (conductor) – Monteverdi; Sabine Devielhe (soloist), Raphaël Pichon (conductor) – Mozart: The Weber Sisters; Anna Netrebko (soloist), Antonio Pappano (conductor) – Verismo	
2017	Ian Bostridge (soloist), Antonio Pappano (accompanist)	Shakespeare Songs	Magdalena Kožená (soloist), Andrea Marcon (conductor) – Monteverdi; Sabine Devielhe (soloist), Raphaël Pichon (conductor) – Mozart: The Weber Sisters; Anna Netrebko (soloist), Antonio Pappano (conductor) – Verismo	
2018	Barbara Hannigan	Crazy Girl Crazy - Music by Gershwin, Berg & Berio	Philippe Jaroussky (soloist); Petra Müllejans (conductor) – Bach & Telemann: Sacred Cantatas; Nicholas Phan (soloist); Myra Huang (accompanist) – Gods & Monsters; Joyce DiDonato (soloist); Maxim Emelyanychev (conductor) – In War & Peace - Harmony Through Music; Dmitri Hvorostovsky (soloist); Constantine Orbelian (conductor) – Sviridov: Russia Cast Adrift	
2019	Karim Sulayman (soloist); Apollo's Fire (ensemble)	Songs of Orpheus - Monteverdi, Caccini, D'India & Landi	Anthony Roth Costanzo (soloist); Jonathan Cohen (conductor) – Arc; Philippe Jaroussky (soloist); Artaserse (ensemble) – The Händel Album; Sabine Devieilhe (soloist); Francois-Xavier Roth (conductor) – Mirages; Randall Scarlata (soloist); Gilbert Kalish (accompanist) – Schubert: Winterreise	
2020	Joyce DiDonato (soloist); Chuck Israels, Jimmy Madison, Charlie Porter & Craig Terry (accompanists)	Songplay	Susan Narucki (soloist) – The Edge of Silence - Works For Voice by György Kurtág; Philippe Jaroussky & Céline Scheen (soloists); Christina Pluhar (conductor); l'Arpeggiata (ensemble) – Himmelsmusik; Matthias Goerne (soloist); Leif Ove Andsnes (accompanist) – Schumann: Liederkreis op. 24, Kerner-Lieder op. 35; Stephen Costello (soloist); Constantine Orbelian (conductor) – A Te, O Cara	
2021	Sarah Brailey & Dashon Burton (soloists); James Blachly (conductor)	Smyth: The Prison · (Experiential Chorus & Experiential Orchestra)	Stephen Powell (main artist); William Bolcom, Ricky Ian Gordon, Lori Laitman, John Musto, Charles Neidich, Jason Vieaux & the Attaca Quartet (accompanists) – American Composers At Play; Nicholas Phan (soloist); Myra Huang (accompanist) – Clairères - Songs by Lili & Nadia Boulanger; Brian Giebler (soloist); Steven McGhee (accompanist) – A Lad's Love; Cecilia Bartoli (soloist); Giovanni Antonini (conductor) – Farinelli	
2022	Sangeeta Kaur & Hilla Plitmann (soloists); Danae Xanthe Vlasse (piano)	Mythologies	Laura Strickling (soloist); Joy Schreier (accompanist) – Confessions; Will Liverman (soloist); Paul Sánchez (accompanist) – Dreams of a New Day - Songs by Black Composers; Joyce DiDonato (soloist); Yannick Nézet-Séguin (accompanist) – Schubert: Winterreise; Jamie Barton (soloist); Jake Heggie (accompanist) – Unexpected Shadows	
2023	Renée Fleming (soloist) & Yannick Nézet-Séguin (accompanist)	Voice of Nature - The Anthropocene	Joyce DiDonato (soloist); Maxim Emelyanychev (conductor) - Eden; Sasha Cooke (soloist); Kirill Kuzmin (accompanist) - How Do I Find You; Will Liverman (soloist); Paul Sánchez (accompanist) - Okpebholo: Lord, How Come Me Here?; Nicholas Phan (soloist); Eric Jacobsen (accompanist) - Stranger - Works for Tenor by Nico Muhly	
2024	Julia Bullock (soloist); Christian Reif (conductor)	Walking in the Dark	Reginald Mobley (soloist); Baptiste Trotignon (accompanist) - Because; Karim Sulayman (soloist); Sean Shibe (accompanist) - Broken Branches; Laura Strickling (soloist); Daniel Schlosberg (accompanist) - 40@40; Lawrence Brownlee (soloist); Kevin J. Miller (accompanist) - Rising	
2025	Karen Slack (soloist); Michelle Cann (pianist)	Beyond the Years - Unpublished Songs of Florence Price	Nicholas Phan (soloist); Palaver Strings (ensemble) - A Change Is Gonna Come; Fotina Naumenko (soloist); Marika Bournaki (pianist) - Newman: Bespoke Songs; Will Liverman (soloist); Jonathan King (pianist) - Show Me The Way; Joyce DiDonato (soloist); Maxim Emelyanychev (conductor of Il Pomo d'Oro) - Wagner: Wesendonck Lieder	
2026	Amanda Forsythe (soloist); Robert Mealy, Paul O'Dette & Stephen Stubbs (conductors, Boston Early Music Festival)	Telemann: Ino - Opera Arias For Soprano	Alison Charney (soloist); Benjamin Loeb (conductor of the National Symphony Orchestra) - Alike - My Mother's Dream; Sidney Outlaw (soloist); Warren Jones (pianist) - Black Pierrot; Devony Smith (soloist); Danny Zelibor (pianist); Michael Nicolas (accompanist) - In This Short Life; Susan Narucki (soloist); Curtis Macomber (accompanist) - Kurtág: Kafka Fragments; Theo Hoffman (soloist); Steven Blier (pianist) (Rupert Boyd, Julia Bullock, Alex Levine, Andrew Owens, Rubén Rengel & Sam Weber - additional vocalists and accompanists) - Schubert Beatles	
2027	TBA on 7 February 2027		Nicolas Phan (soloist); Myra Huang (pianist); Jasper String Quartet (artists) - Lamenting Earth; Laura Strickling (soloist); Joy Schreier (pianist) - Legends: Rebellion; Kenneth Overton (soloist); Elizabeth Hill (pianist) - The Living Spiritual; John Holiday (soloist); Kevin J. Miller (pianist) - Over My Head; Reginald Mobley (soloist); Brandon J. Acker & Douglas Balliett (artists) - Solitude	
