= Hila Plitmann =

American opera singer

- הילה פליטמן
- Born: August 9, 1973 (age 53); Jerusalem, Israel
- Education: Juilliard School
- Occupations: Singer, songwriter, actress
- Spouse: Eric Whitacre (m. 1998) (divorced 2017)
- Website: hilaplitmann.com

Hila Plitmann (Hebrew: הילה פליטמן; born August 9, 1973) is an Israeli-American two-time Grammy Award-winning operatic soprano, songwriter, and actress specializing in the performance of new works.

== Career ==
=== Education ===
- Juilliard School of Music: Bachelor of Music and Master of Music degrees with high honors

=== Performances ===
In 1998, one year after graduating from the Juilliard School, Plitmann premiered Pulitzer Prize winner David Del Tredici's The Spider and the Fly on only two weeks notice with The New York Philharmonic under the baton of Kurt Masur.

Her theatrical acting debut was in the role of Sharon in the Fountain Theater's production of Master Class by Terrence McNally.

Other notable performances include the world premiere of Pulitzer Prize-winning composer David Del Tredici's Paul Revere's Ride with the Atlanta Symphony under Robert Spano; and the world premiere of Esa-Pekka Salonen's Wing on Wing with the Los Angeles Philharmonic at Disney Hall; the premiere of Eric Whitacre and David Norona's groundbreaking Paradise Lost: Shadows and Wings in Los Angeles; John Corigliano's Mr. Tambourine Man with the Brooklyn Philharmonic; the world premiere of Andrea Clearfield's The Long Bright with Orchestra 2001; the premiere of a new song cycle written for her by composer Aaron Jay Kernis; the Naxos world premiere recording of John Corigliano's Mr. Tambourine Man with the Buffalo Philharmonic Orchestra, JoAnn Falletta, conductor; and David Del Tredici's Final Alice with the National Symphony Orchestra under the direction of Leonard Slatkin.

In 2009, Plitmann created the role of Mrs Clayton in the Opera Santa Barbara production of Stephen Schwartz's opera Séance on a Wet Afternoon, and in 2015 she created the role of Yan in Mark Adamo's Becoming Santa Claus.

=== Awards ===
In 1996, Plitmann won the Sony ES Prize for outstanding contribution to the vocal arts.

In 2007, for her role of Exstasis in Eric Whitacre's electro-musical Paradise Lost: Shadows and Wings at the Boston Court Theatre in Pasadena, Plitmann was nominated for "Best Lead Actress in a Musical" at the Los Angeles Ovation Awards and the L.A. Ticketholder Awards.

In February 2009, Plitmann was awarded the Grammy Award for Best Classical Vocal Performance for her 2009 performance of Corigliano: Mr. Tambourine Man: Seven Poems of Bob Dylan.

Plitmann won her second Grammy Award for Best Classical Vocal Performance in 2022 for Mythologies, an album inspired by Ancient Greece with original compositions by Danaë Xanthe Vlasse, recorded with Vlasse and soprano Sangeeta Kaur.

=== Acting and Film Music ===
Plitmann can be heard as a featured vocal soloist on many film scores and soundtracks.

- The Da Vinci Code
- Pirates of the Caribbean: On Stranger Tides
- Pirates of the Caribbean: At World's End
- Hail Caesar!
- Batman v. Superman: Dawn of Justice
- Ghostbusters (2016)
- Argentina, 1985
- New York, I Love You

Plitmann has appeared in acting/singing roles both live on stage and filmed, including Hershey Felder's musical films Dante and Beatrice and Mozart and Figaro in Vienna, and in Eric Whitacre's electro-musical Paradise Lost: Shadows and Wings.

=== Recordings ===
- Ms. Inez Sez, song cycle by David Del Tredici, CRI label
- Lament for the Death of a Bullfighter, song cycle by David Del Tredici (featuring the composer at the piano) Music & Arts label
- Paul Revere's Ride by David Del Tredici with the Atlanta Symphony Orchestra, Robert Spano conducting, Telarc label
- Emily Dickinson Songs by Robert Beaser with the American Academy, Rome label
- Hans Zimmer's soundtrack to the Hollywood film, The Da Vinci Code Decca label
- Vintage Alice/Dracula by David Del Tredici with the Cleveland Chamber Symphony, INNOVA label (2008)
- John Corigliano: Mr. Tambourine Man: Seven Poems of Bob Dylan – Hila Plitmann (JoAnn Falletta; Buffalo Philharmonic Orchestra)
- The Palm Trees Are Restless: Five Poems of Kate Gale, song cycle by Mark Abel, Delos label
- Richard Danielpour: The Passion of Yeshua (UCLA Chamber Singers, Buffalo Philharmonic Chorus and Orchestra, JoAnn Falletta), Naxos label
- John Corigliano: Conjurer/Vocalise (Albany Symphony, David Alan Miller), Naxos label
- The Ancient Question … a voyage through Jewish songs, Signum Classics label
- George Benjamin: Into the Little Hill (London Sinfonietta), Nimbus Records label
- Richard Danielpour: Toward a Season of Peace (Pacific Symphony and Chorale, Carl St. Clair, John Alexander), Naxos label
- Frank Zappa: 200 Motels, The Suites (Los Angeles Philharmonic & Master Chorale, Esa-Pekka Salonen), Zappa Records label
- Andrea Clearfield: Women of Valor (Los Angeles Jewish Symphony, Noreen Green), Albany Records label
- Mark Abel: Time and Distance, Delos label
- Mark Abel: The Cave of Wondrous Voice, Delos label
- Paola Prestini: Oceanic Verses (Decoda Orchestra, The Choir of Trinity Wall Street, Julian Wachner), VIA Records label
- Paola Prestini: Body Maps (VisionIntoArt Ensemble, Stephen Gosling, Jeffrey Zeigler), Tzadik label
- Jeff Beal: The Paper Lined Shack (The Eastman Philharmonia, Leonard Slatkin), Supertrain Records label
- Danaë Xanthe Vlasse: Poème, MSR Classics label
- Danaë Xanthe Vlasse: Mythologies, Cézanne Records label

== Personal life ==
From 1998 to 2017 she was married to composer Eric Whitacre. On February 2, 2025, her life-partner poet Todd Boss proposed to her on the red carpet of the 67th Annual Grammy Awards. Plitmann holds a black belt in Tae Kwon Do.
