= Danaë Xanthe Vlasse =

French-American pianist

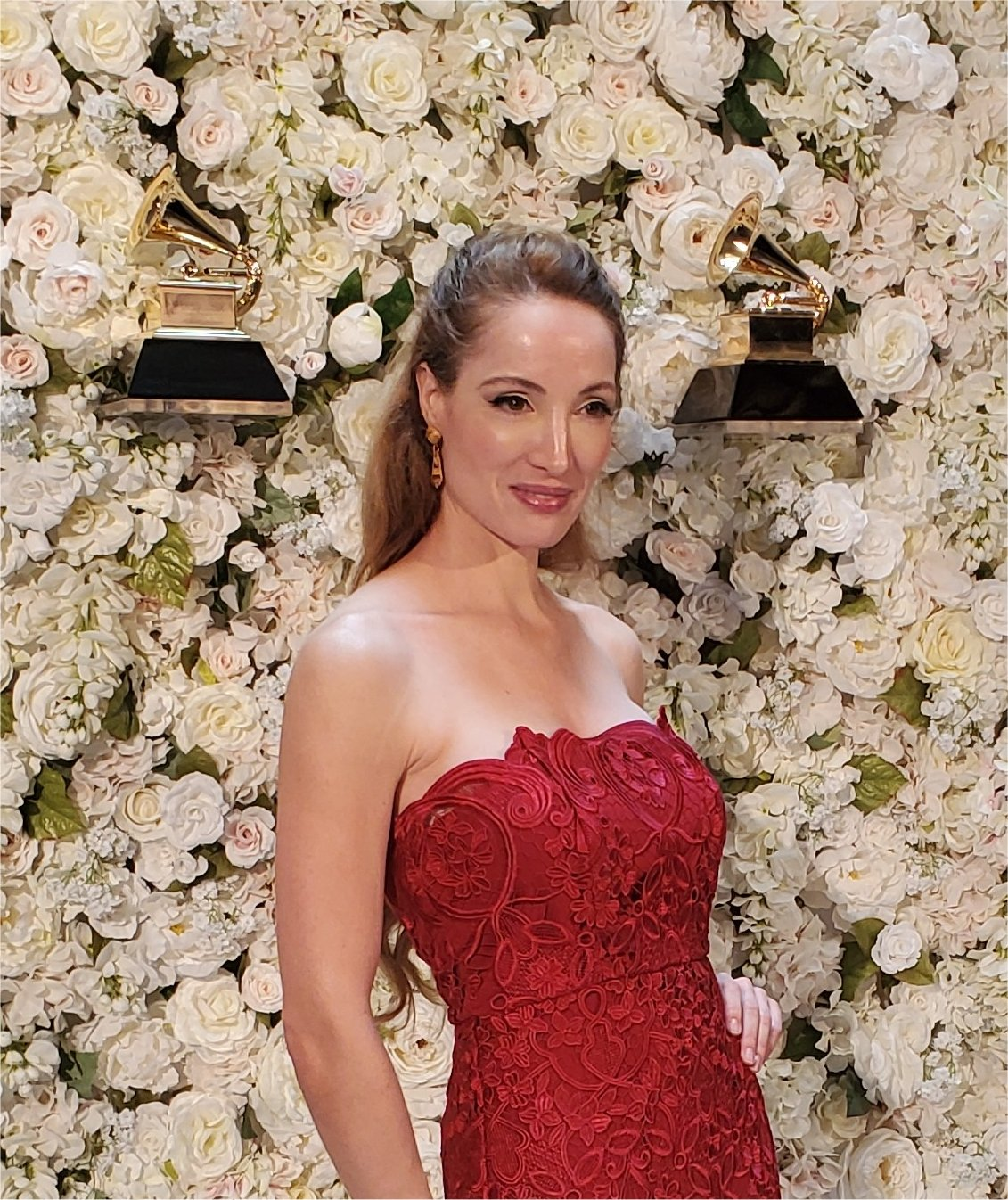
- Vlasse at Grammy party in 2022

Background information
- Born: Danaë Xanthe Vlasse
- Origin: Bordeaux, France
- Genres: Classical, new age
- Occupations: Pianist; Composer; Performing artist; Music teacher; Music producer
- Instrument: Piano
- Website: www.danaevlasse.com

Danaë Xanthe Vlasse (also known as Danaë Vlasse) is a French-American pianist, composer, performing artist, music producer, and music teacher. She won a Grammy Award for Best Classical Solo Vocal Album for Mythologies in 2022. Her song "Penelope", from the album, was featured in 2021 on PBS's Front & Center, performed by Sangeeta Kaur. In 2024, she was nominated for a Grammy Award for Mythologies II for "Best Classical Compendium."

== Music career ==
Vlasse is a classical pianist, composer, music producer, performing artist, and music teacher. She has released six studio albums, and received a Grammy Award for Mythologies in 2022. She has performed at Skirball Cultural Center and SXSW (South by Southwest). Her compositions have been performed on PBS's Front & Center, at Segerstrom Center for the Arts, and at Mt. Wilson Observatory, by Sangeeta Kaur and Hila Plitmann.

In 2022, Vlasse was inducted into the Indie Music Hall of Fame. She has also been recognized by the Producer's Choice Awards, Clouzine International Music Awards, Indie Music Channel Awards, and Radio Music Awards.

In 2024, she was nominated for a Grammy Award for Mythologies II for "Best Classical Compendium."

Vlasse is the director of Music Vision Studios, where she teaches piano, theory and composition. She graduated from the University of Alabama in Huntsville (UAH) in 2003 with a degree in Piano Performance and moved to Los Angeles shortly afterward to pursue her aspirations of composing music.

== Early life ==
Vlasse was born in Bordeaux, France to parents Marcus (née Vlassopoulos) and Claire Vlasse. Her father is of Greek descent, and her mother of French descent. Her father grew up on the island of Ithaca (which inspired her compositions on Mythologies) and her mother was a teacher. "I began studying music so young I don't even remember my first piano lesson. In some sense music was so ingrained in my life that I just kept doing it because nothing else was powerful enough to pull me away from it," Vlasse said in an interview with Shoutout LA.

== Discography ==
- 2013 - The Swans, 12 Valses Mélancoliques
- 2015 - Celebrations and Commemoration
- 2017 - Trilogies
- 2018 - Solstice
- 2020 - Poème
- 2021 - Mythologies
- 2024 - Mythologies II

== Awards ==
Year	Nominated work	Category	Award	Result
2013	Fantasie #1	Award of Merit	Global Music Award	Won
2016	Intermezzo D’Anniversaire	Best Classical Recording	Radio Music Award	Won
2017	Cloudsail	Best Classical Demo	Indie Music Channel Award	Won
2017	Trois Chansons Sans Paroles with Mischa Lefkowitz	Best Classical Song	Indie Music Channel Award	Won
2017	Intermezzo D’Anniversaire	Best New Age Artist	Hollywood Music in Media Award	Nominated
2017	Solstice Serenade with Mischa Lefkowitz	Best Instrumental Recording	Radio Music Awards	Won
2017	Trilogies	Classical Piano Solo; Best Composition/Composer and Best Album/Silver Medal	Global Music Awards	Won
2018	Trilogies	Best Instrumental Album	CLOUZINE International Music Award	Nominated
2018	Trilogies	Best Classical Album	Independent Music Award	Nominated
2018	Rêverie with Mischa Lefkowitz	Best Classical Duo	Radio Music Award	Nominated
2018	Trilogies	Album of the Year	Indie Music Channel Award	Won
2018	Nocturne #3, (Arrangement for Piano and Orchestra with Sanchit Balhara)	Classical Instrumental	Hollywood Music in Media Award	Nominated
2018	Solstice with Mischa Lefkowitz	Best Duo and Best Album	Global Music Award	Won
2018	Danaë Xanthe Vlasse	Outstanding Classical Solo Artist	Producer's Choice Honors	Won
2018	Swan Song	Outstanding Achievement Award	Cult Critic Award	Won
2018	Nocturne-Meditation	Best Classical Producer	Radio Music Award	Won
2019	Serenade de Verlaine	Best Classical Producer	Indie Music Channel Award	Won
2019	Serenade II	Best Classical Category	Peace Song Award	Won
2020	Rêverie	Music Video of the Year & Best Classical Music Video	Indie Music Channel Awards	Won
2020	Serenade de Verlaine	Best Classical Songwriter	Radio Music Award	Won
2020	La Mer	Best Classical Songwriter	Indie Music Channel	Won
2020	Nocturne #4	Best Classical Artist	Radio Music Award	Won
2020	Poème	Gold Medal Winner Artist/Composer	Global Music Award	Won
2022	Mythologies	Best Classical Solo Vocal Album	Grammy Award	Won
2022	Danaë Xanthe Vlasse	Classical	Indie Music Hall of Fame Inductee	Won
2023	Danaë Xanthe Vlasse	Contemporary Classical	Hollywood Independent Music Award	Nominated
2024	Mythologies II	Best Classical Compendium	Grammy Award	Nominated
