= Mythologies (Danaë Xanthe Vlasse album) =

Studio album by Danaë Xanthe Vlasse
- Released: August 6, 2021
- Recorded: 2016–2021
- Genre: Classical
- Length: 60:14
- Label: Cezanne Records
- Producer: Danaë Xanthe Vlasse and Emilio D. Miler

Danaë Xanthe Vlasse chronology
Poème (2020)	Mythologies (2021)

Mythologies is the sixth studio album by French-American composer and pianist Danaë Xanthe Vlasse, and won a Grammy Award for Best Classical Solo Vocal Album in 2022 at the 64th Annual Grammy Awards. The album features sopranos Sangeeta Kaur and Hila Plitmann and was released in the US on August 6, 2021 on Cezanne Records.

== History ==
"Mythologies", written and performed by Danaë Xanthe Vlasse, featuring sopranos Sangeeta Kaur and Hila Plitmann, received a Grammy Award for Best Classical Solo Vocal Album in 2022. The album was written and recorded in 2016 – 2021 in Los Angeles, California, Buenos Aires, Argentina, and Johannesburg, South Africa and was co-produced by Vlasse and Emilio D. Miler. Vlasse released a music video for Sirens in 2021.

Vlasse cites her father and his Greek heritage from Ithaca as well as her love of Mythology as the inspiration for creating the album. "Mythologies is designed to honor my 87 year old father because all the music is inspired by my Greek heritage. This project features various combinations of piano, vocals (with sopranos, Hila Plitmann and Sangeeta Kaur), plus strings, flute and percussion.", Vlasse told Voyage LA Magazine.

In an interview with Rob Mullins, Vlasse shared that she reached out to Kaur in the fall of 2017 as she was drawn to her crossover genres with classical training, opera, and new age music. When Kaur responded, Vlasse learned that they were both fans of each other's music and began working together.

== Track listing ==
No.	Title	Writer(s)	Length
1.	"Sirens"	Danaë Xanthe Vlasse	11:12
2.	"Poseidon Odysseus"	Danaë Xanthe Vlasse	9:07
3.	"Penelope"	Danaë Xanthe Vlasse	7:19
4.	"Nepenthe"	Danaë Xanthe Vlasse	8:17
5.	"Euterpe's Lament"	Danaë Xanthe Vlasse	6:44
6.	"Metamorphoses"	Danaë Xanthe Vlasse	17:38
7.	"Sirens (Cinematic)"	Danaë Xanthe Vlasse	3:46

== Credits ==
- Danaë Xanthe Vlasse - Music, Lyrics, Piano, Lyra (tracks 1, 2, 3, 4, 5, 6, 7)
- Sangeeta Kaur - Soprano (tracks 1, 2, 3, 5, 7)
- Hila Plitmann - Soprano (tracks 1, 2, 3, 5, 7)
- Eru Matsumoto - Cello (tracks 4, 5)
- Virginie D'Avezac - Viola (track 5)
- Wouter Kellerman - Flutes (tracks 2, 3)
- Lili Haydn - Violin (track 4)
- Nadeem Maldalany - Percussion - (tracks 2, 7)
- Robert Thies - Piano (track 4)
- Brendan White - Piano (tracks 1, 7)
- Emilio D.Miler - Percussion (track 7)

=== Production ===
- Producer - Danaë Xanthe Vlasse and Emilio D. Miler
- Mix engineer - Gerhard Joost
- Recording engineers - Gerhard Joost, Emilio D. Miler, Danaë Xanthe Vlasse, Sangeeta Kaur, Éru Matsumoto, Nadeem Majdalany, Lili Haydn, Hila Plitmann, Virginie d’Avezac de Castéra, Wouter Kellerman
- Mastering engineer - Silas Brown
- Additional engineering - Nick Tipp
- Album artwork - Greg Spalenka
- Graphic design - Jeff Burne

== Release history ==
Region	Date	Format	Label
United States	August 6, 2021	CD, digital download	Cezanne Records
