= Wouter Kellerman =

South African producer and flautist

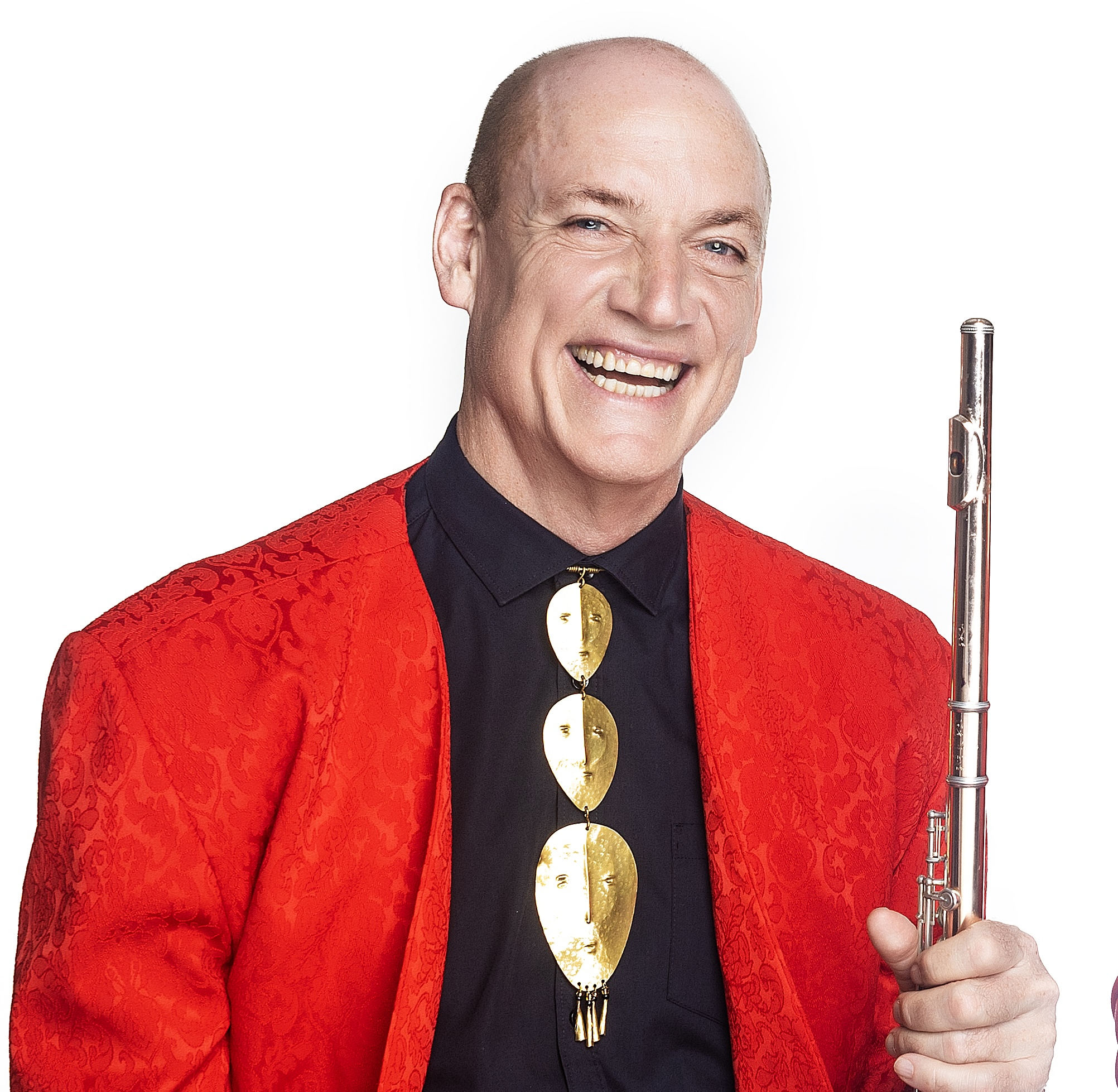
- Kellerman in 2018

Background information
- Born: 20 September 1961 (age 65); Johannesburg, South Africa
- Genres: World, Roots, Classical, Jazz, Instrumental
- Occupations: Musician, Composer & Producer
- Instruments: Flute, "c" flute (traverse flute), Bass Flute, Fife, Alto Flute, Bansuri (Indian Flute)
- Years active: 1981–present
- Website: wouterkellerman.org

Wouter Kellerman (born 20 September 1961) is a three-time Grammy Award-winning South African flautist, producer, composer and philanthropist, who has won nine South African Music Awards. Classically trained, Kellerman performs primarily World, Roots and New Age music.

== Background ==
Kellerman was born in Johannesburg in 1961 to parents Pieter van Ellewee Kellerman and Susanna Petronella Greeff. At age ten, he and his siblings were introduced to classical music at a symphony orchestra concert. His parents allowed the children to choose an instrument they wanted to learn to play. Kellerman chose the flute as his instrument, and his parents hired the equipment and arranged lessons at the Randburg Music Centre. Matriculating from high school with distinctions in mathematics, music and computer science, his parents were unable to fund a classical music education. He was able to obtain a bursary from Anglo-American and studied electrical engineering at the University of Johannesburg.

During his studies, he taught the flute and played in the Junior SABC Symphony Orchestra, the National Youth Orchestra and as a soloist with the Johannesburg Symphony Orchestra. On completing his studies, his bursary had to be paid off with work at Anglo Coal in the Witbank area. With two children to raise on his own, and not able to financially support them in music, he continued his engineering career while pursuing music part time. He continued his professional flautist training by attending yearly masterclasses overseas. With his children beginning their tertiary education in the early 2000s, he was finally able to pursue music full time.

== Career ==
Beginning his professional career Kellerman spent four years working on his album collaborating with audio engineer S. Husky Höskulds. He released his first album, Colour in 2007, by music company Mastermax after being rejected by many South African music labels.

Kellerman received a Grammy Award at the 57th Annual Grammy Awards for his 2014 album Winds of Samsara, a collaboration with Indian composer and producer Ricky Kej. Winds of Samsara reached No. 1 on the US New Age Album Billboard Charts and also peaked at No. 1 on the ZMR (Zone Music Reporter) Top 100 Radio Airplay Chart in the month of July 2014.

Kellerman's Love Language (2015) received a Grammy nomination for 'Best Contemporary Instrumental Album', and won a SAMA for 'Best Instrumental and/or Classical Album'. It debuted at No. 1 on the World Music Billboard charts in July 2015. This album also featured at No. 1 on the ZMR Top 100 International Radio Airplay Chart in August 2015, and spent 11 weeks in the CMJ New World Top 40 Chart, peaking at No. 12.

His next project was a collaboration with the Soweto Gospel Choir, Symphonic Soweto – A Tribute to Nelson Mandela. The album re-conceptualised traditional music, freedom songs (including Mandela favourite, "Lizalis’idinga") and popular songs by South African legends (including Brenda Fassie, Lucky Dube and Miriam Makeba), from a symphonic and choral perspective – as part of honouring Nelson Mandela in the year he would have celebrated his 100th birthday. Symphonic Soweto won the 2018 SAMA for Best Adult Contemporary Album – Kellerman's seventh SAMA recognition. From Symphonic Soweto, Kellerman's collaborative composition Soweto Travels won the USA Songwriting Competition for Best Instrumental Composition in 2017.

As part of his mission to work with and uplift children, Kellerman collaborated with the Ndlovu Youth Choir (a rural choir based in Moutse in the Limpopo province of South Africa) in 2018. Their African version of Ed Sheeran's Shape of You became an internet sensation, going viral with tens of millions of views on social media, and winning awards like the HMMA (Hollywood Music in Media Awards) for 'Best Independent Music Video' – pushing the Ndlovu Youth Choir firmly into the international limelight. This resulted in America's Got Talent scouting the choir to enter the 2019 competition. Ndlovu went ahead and delivered a sensational first few rounds, going all the way through to the finals of the competition, showcasing South African music and spirit in the process. Their collaboration is part of Kellerman's 2019 album In A Different Light, in which he re-imagines and re-shapes some of his favourite melodies by approaching them from a fresh angle.

Kellerman received his third Grammy nomination for Pangaea, his collaborative album with David Arkenstone in 2021 and his fourth Grammy nomination (and his second win) in 2023 for his song Bayethe, with South African artists Nomcebo Zikode and Zakes Bantwini in the Best Global Music Performance category. In 2025, he won his third Grammy Award for Triveni, his collaborative album with Chandrika Tandon and Eru Matsumoto, in the Best New Age, Ambient, or Chant Album category.

In recognition of his contributions to music and philanthropy, Kellerman was awarded an honorary doctorate from Tshwane University of Technology in 2024. He received the Alumni Dignitas Award from the University of Johannesburg in late 2024. In 2025, he was honoured with the Cultural Excellence Award from the High Commissioner of India. In November he received the AABLA (All African Business Leader Award) for Sports, Arts and Culture. Kellerman was named one of the 100 Most Reputable Africans of 2026.

In 2026, Kellerman was awarded The Order of Ikhamanga in Gold, South Africa's highest national honour awarded to individuals who have excelled in the fields of arts, culture, literature, music, journalism and sport. He was recognised for his achievements as a flautist, composer and arranger, and for his contributions to community development through music.

=== Performance highlights ===
- Kellerman performed at the closing ceremony of the 2010 Soccer World Cup for 700 million people.
- Performed at the Joy of Jazz Festival in Johannesburg in 2010, 2016 and 2022.
- Performed at the 2017 Byron Bay Bluesfest in Australia.
- Performed at the South African/Russia Cultural Season in St Petersburg in Russia in November 2017
- Performed at the 2010 Expo in Shanghai, China
- Performed at the 2010 opening of Midem in Cannes, France. Midem is the world's biggest music conference.
- Performed at the Kennedy Center in Washington DC in 2012 and 2015
- Performed at Carnegie Hall in NYC in October 2014, October 2015 and November 2019
- Performed at the Woodford Folk Festival in Australia in 2013/2014
- Performed at the Rajasthan International Folk Festival in Jodhpur, India in October 2015 and 2018
- Performed for the President of India in December 2015
- Performed in Johannesburg for the visiting Prime Minister of India, Narendra Modi and a television audience of more than 200 million people in June 2016.
- Performed in Kuwait at the Al Yarmouk Theater on 17 April 2019, at a show coordinated by the South African Embassy.
- Performed at the Dubai Expo in Dubai in October 2021, opening Heritage Week for South Africa.
- Performed as soloist with the South African Mzansi National Philharmonic Orchestra and conductor Marin Alsop in Johannesburg, Durban and Cape Town in December 2022
- Performed an intimate hour-long concert for 9 people only, which included the President of South Africa Cyril Ramaphosa, the President of China Xi Jinping, the Prime Minister of India Narendra Modi and President of Brazil Luiz Inácio Lula da Silva in August 2023.
- Performed at the BRICS Gala Dinner for 55 heads of state in August 2023.
- Headlined at Alpen Capital's Global Fusion Concert in Dubai in January 2024 and January 2026.

Kellerman's flute-playing can be heard on the soundtrack of the Emmy Award-winning film Eye of the Leopard.

== Philanthropy ==
Kellerman has sponsored the living expenses of 10 children in the SOS Children's Village in Ennerdale, South Africa for the past 20 years and has also financed the building of a house in the SOS Children's Village in Rustenburg. For his continued efforts in helping give these children a better life, Kellerman was nominated by the SOS Children's Villages for the 2007 Inyathelo Special Recognition Award for Philanthropy. He continues to facilitate the teaching of young dance and music students.

Kellerman provided the seed funding for the Keiskamma Music Academy in the Eastern Cape, founded by fellow flautist, Helen Vosloo.

Wouter has worked closely and performs regularly with the charity 67 Blankets For Nelson Mandela.

Kellerman recorded a song called 'Homeland' for Refugees awareness in March 2022 and performed on 10 December 2020 for the NPO Turquoise Harmony Institute to raise awareness of the plight of refugees

== Discography ==
- Colour (2007)
- Two Voices (2010)
- Half Moon (2012)
- Mzansi (2013)
- Winds of Samsara (2014)
- Love Language (2015)
- Symphonic Soweto, a Tribute to Nelson Mandela (2017)
- In A Different Light (2019)
- We've Known All Times (2020)
- Pangaea (2021)
- Triveni (2024)

== Awards and nominations ==
Year	Recipient	Award	Result	Ref.
2007	Wouter Kellerman	Inyathelo Special Recognition Award for Philanthropy	Nominated	
2008	Wouter Kellerman	South African Music Award (SAMA) for Colour – 'Best Instrumental Album'	Nominated	
2010	Wouter Kellerman	SAMA for Best Instrumental/Jazz/popular Classical DVD for Live in Mzansi	Won	
2011	Wouter Kellerman	SAMA for Best Instrumental Album for Two Voices	Won	
2013	Wouter Kellerman	Vox Pop IMA (Independent Music Award) for Best World Beat Album for Mzansi	Won	
2014	Wouter Kellerman	HMMA (Hollywood Music in Media Awards): World Music and New Age	Nominated	
2015	Wouter Kellerman / Ricky Kej	57th Annual Grammy Award for 'Best New Age Album' for Winds of Samsara	Won	
2015	Wouter Kellerman	SAMA for 'Best Instrumental Album' for Winds of Samsara	Won	
2015	Wouter Kellerman	SAMA for 'Best Producer of the Year' for Winds of Samsara	Won	
2015	Wouter Kellerman	SAMA for 'Best International Achievement'	Won	
2015	Wouter Kellerman	ZMR award for Best World Album for Winds of Samsara	Won	
2015	Wouter Kellerman	ZMR award for Album of the Year for Winds of Samsara	Won	
2016	Wouter Kellerman	58th Grammy Award for 'Best Contemporary Instrumental Album' for Love Language	Nominated	
2016	Wouter Kellerman	ZMR award for Best World Album for Love Language	Nominated	
2016	Wouter Kellerman	SAMA for 'Best Instrumental and/or Classical Album' for Love Language	Won	
2016	Wouter Kellerman	Global Peace Song Award in the public voted Acoustic/ Contemporary Music category	Won	
2017	Wouter Kellerman / Soweto Gospel Choir	HMMA (Hollywood Music in Media Awards): Best World Music Song and Best Music Video	Nominated	
2017	Wouter Kellerman	USA Songwriting Competition – Best Instrumental Composition	Won	
2018	Wouter Kellerman / Soweto Gospel Choir	SAMA for 'Best Adult Contemporary Album' for Symphonic Soweto, a Tribute to Nelson Mandela	Won	
2019	Wouter Kellerman / Ndlovu Youth Choir	HMMA (Hollywood Music in Media Award) for Independent Music Video	Won	
2020	Wouter Kellerman	IMA (Independent Music Awards) for Best Social Action Video for Baroque to the Rescue (feat. Konshens The MC and Lady Zamar)	Won	
2020	Wouter Kellerman	IMA (Independent Music Awards) Best Concept Album for In A Different Light	Nominated	
2020	Wouter Kellerman	IMA (Independent Music Awards) Best Producer of an Instrumental Album for In A Different Light	Nominated	
2020	Wouter Kellerman	IMA (Independent Music Awards) Best Social Action Song for Baroque to the Rescue (feat. Konshens The MC and Lady Zamar)	Nominated	
2020	Wouter Kellerman	IMA (Independent Music Awards) Best Performance Video for Shape of You (feat. Ndlovu Youth Choir)	Nominated	
2020	Wouter Kellerman	SAMA for the 'Best Produced Album of the Year' for In A Different Light	Nominated	
2020	Wouter Kellerman	Wouter Kellerman	Nominated	
2020	Wouter Kellerman/ Nadia Shpachenko	HMMA (Hollywood Music in Media Award) for Catching Up	Nominated	
2020	Wouter Kellerman/ Mzansi Youth Choir	HMMA (Hollywood Music in Media Award) for 'Best Independent Music Video' for The Climb	Nominated	
2021	Wouter Kellerman	SAMA for 'Best Classical/Instrumental Album' for We’ve Known All Times	Won	
2021	Wouter Kellerman/David Arkenstone	64th GRAMMY Award for 'Best New Age Album' for Pangaea	Nominated	
2022	Wouter Kellerman/Nomcebo Zikode/Zakes Bantwini	65th GRAMMY Award for 'Best Global Music Performance' for Bayethe	Won	
2023	Wouter Kellerman	SAMA 29 International Achievement	Won	
2024	Wouter Kellerman	Received an Honorary Doctorate of Art and Design from Tshwane University of Technology	Won	
2024	Wouter Kellerman	Received an Alumni Dignitas Award from University of Johannesburg	Won	
2025	Wouter Kellerman, Chandrika Tandon, Eru Matsumoto	67th GRAMMY Award for 'Best New Age, Ambient or Chant Album' for Triveni	Won	
2025	Wouter Kellerman	AABLA (All African Business Leaders Award)	Won	
2026	Wouter Kellerman	100 Most Reputable Africans of 2026	Won	
2026	Wouter Kellerman	Order of Ikhamanga in Gold (OIG)	Won	
