= Sangeeta Kaur =

American musician

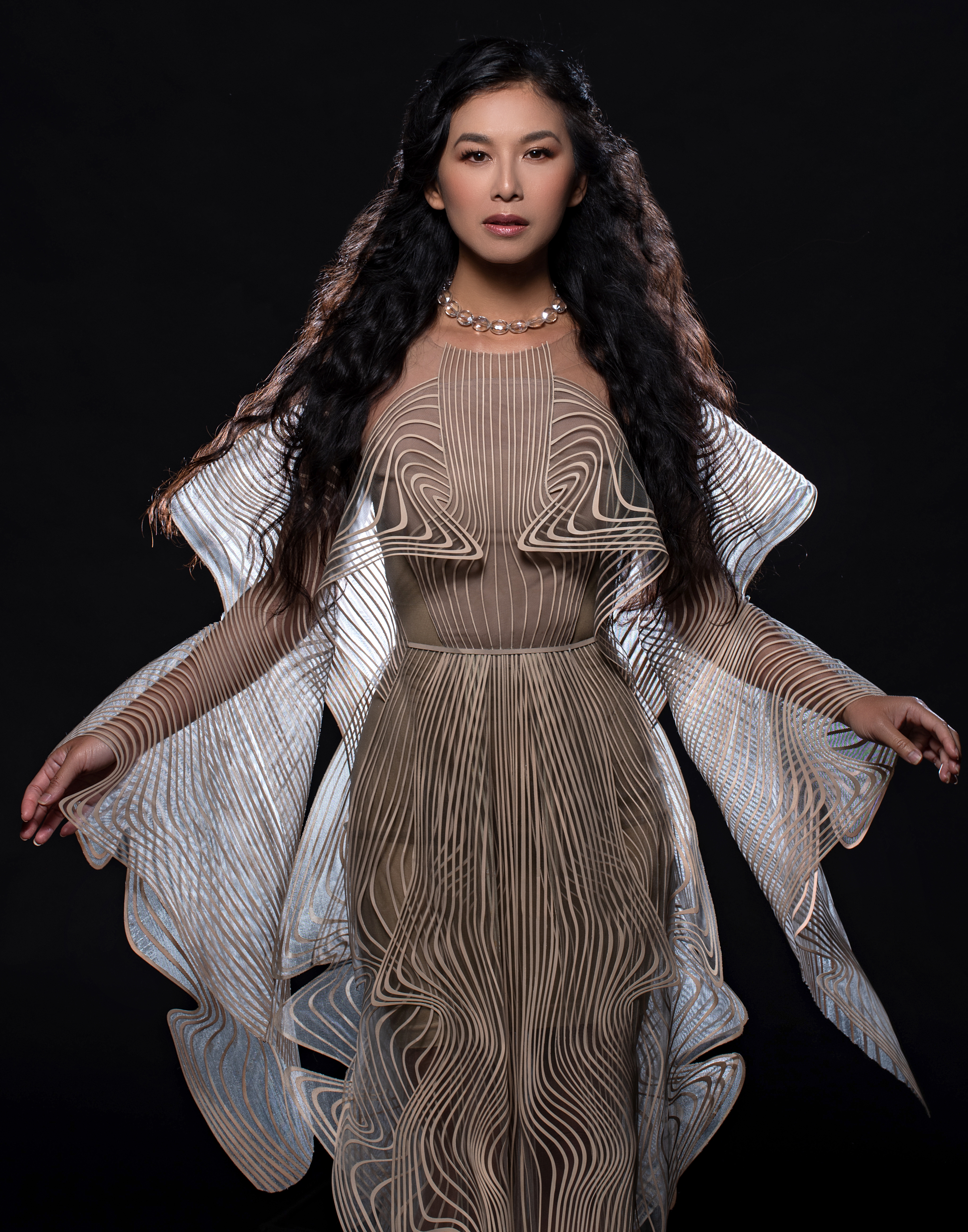
- Kaur in 2020

Background information
- Born: Loan Xuan Mai; Teresa Mai (baptism name)
- Origin: Montclair, California, U.S.
- Genres: Classical crossover, New age
- Occupations: Vocalist, composer, performing artist, producer
- Instrument: Vocals
- Website: www.sangeetakaurmusic.com

Sangeeta Kaur is a Grammy Award winning American classical/crossover, new age vocalist, composer, performing artist, and producer. In 2022, she received a Grammy Award for Best Classical Solo Vocal Album for Mythologies, making her the first Vietnamese-American singer to receive a Grammy for a vocal performance. She has performed at the Sydney Opera House and Lincoln Center, among others and in 2021 made her debut television performance, "Sangeeta Kaur and Friends", with Jon Anderson of Yes and Jake Shimabukuro, among others on PBS's Front & Center music series. Kaur performed vocals on Stewart Copeland's and Ricky Kej's 2022 Grammy Award Winning album, Divine Tides.

She has won awards including being inducted to the Independent Music Hall of Fame in 2020. Kaur and her husband, Hai Nguyen, own and run Studio Hill recording studio in Austin, Texas.

== Early life ==
Kaur was born in Montclair, California (born Loan Xuan Mai or Mai Xuân Loan in Vietnamese) and later adopted her baptism name, Teresa Mai. She is of Vietnamese descent and was raised in Manhattan Beach, California. "When I was 4 years old, I got a hold of a VHS copy of The Sound of Music, and that did it for me," said Kaur. She earned a Bachelor of Music degree in Opera Performance at California State University, Long Beach (Bob Cole Conservatory of Music), and a Masters of Music in Vocal Performance from the Boston Conservatory at Berklee.

== Career ==
Kaur is a singer, composer, multi-media performing artist, and producer whose genres are classified as classical crossover and new age music. In 2022, Kaur was awarded a Grammy Award for Best Classical Solo Vocal Album for Mythologies.

She has released six studio albums: Yoga is Love (2012), Niguma (2016), Ascension, Niguma Vol. 2 (2017), which was also the music for her mantra opera, Niguma: The Mantra Project, which premiered at the Broad Stage in Santa Monica, CA. Her later releases include Mirrors (2018) and Compassion (2019) created with the Budapest Studio Orchestra, the Budapest Studio Choir, & Sterling Ensemble. In 2020, she released Illuminance, produced by Grammy Award-winning composer and pianist Peter Kater and co-produced by Kaur which debuted at #1 on Amazon's Hot New Releases chart.

Kaur was classically trained as an operatic vocalist, who while performing internationally, was introduced to the world of spiritual mantra as well as the practice of Kundalini Yoga. When asked about her new age music career in an interview, "It was opera all the way — no Broadway, no contemporary — and if you sang outside of opera, you were bad," said Kaur. "But after I went to New York City for auditions, I began to study yoga and spirituality deeply. And this started me to shift my entire perspective as to what my purpose was in life … my calling was to bring joy and healing to everyone through my music".

Kaur has performed internationally including the Sydney Opera House, the Lincoln Center, Segerstrom Center for the Arts, SXSW, and the Melbourne Recital Centre. In May 2021, she performed as part of PBS's Front & Center music series, (Sangeeta Kaur and Friends), performing with Jon Anderson of Yes and Jake Shimabukuro.

As the creator and producer of the musical production, Niguma, The Mantra Project, Kaur performed the ancient story based on the 11th century yogini by the name of Lady Niguma, told through songs from her previous two albums, modern classical dance, yoga and visual arts. Niguma, The Mantra Project, premiered at The Broad Stage, in Santa Monica, California on November 5, 2016.

In 2022, at the South by Southwest music festival, Kaur and her production company, Studio Hill Productions, partnered with Wisdome LA, Los Angeles’ largest immersive art and music dome park, to produce a replica, Wisdome 360 Immersive Dome Park, in downtown Austin, Texas.

== Spirituality and yoga ==
Kaur began her spiritual journey while living in New York. She met her spiritual teachers who then guided her toward her practice and studies in Tibetan Buddhism, Kundalini Yoga, Yoga of Lady Niguma and the Yoga of Sound and Mantra. She released her first Mantra album Yoga is Love in 2012 and collaborated on several other albums with teachers and artists Amanbir Singh and Sajah Singh. She is a featured artist on Ra Ma Record's first compilation album that was released in 2013. Kaur changed her name from Teresa Mai to Sangeeta Kaur, (which means Princess of Music and Harmony), at her yogi's suggestion. She used to held yoga classes in Hanoi and Ho Chi Minh City, Vietnam.

== Social contributions ==
Kaur is the founder of the non-profit organization Empower With Art Productions, which recognizes up-and-coming talent in music, dance, and visual arts. EWAP produces professional level productions for artists to gain experience and showcase their gifts and talents.

Kaur is active in the Vietnamese community. In addition to writing and producing her own body of music, she has performed in some Vietnamese productions such as, Paris By Night, by Thuy Nga Productions, and ASIA Productions, the non-profit Pearl of the Heart Productions which supports Vietnamese International artists and disabled artists. She is also a resident singer for the Vietnamese American Philharmonics non-profit under its director, Khanh Hong Nguyen.

Kaur is an international Kundalini Yoga teacher, mantra artist, and in 2016 founded Sat Nam Yoga, a community based yoga studio in Little Saigon (Westminster, California), for Vietnamese students to attend for donations and at no charge to those who could not afford it. She closed the studio in 2020 due to the COVID-19 pandemic.

== Personal life ==
Kaur is married to singer and classical guitarist Hai Nguyen. Kaur and Hai now split their time between Marina Del Rey, California and Austin, Texas, where they own and run, Studio Hill, recording studio.

== Discography ==
- 2012 - Yoga is Love
- 2016 - Niguma
- 2017 - Ascension, Niguma VOL. 2: The Mantra Project
- 2018 - Mirrors
- 2019 - Compassion
- 2020 - Illuminance

== Awards ==
Year	Nominated work	Category	Award	Result
2022	Mythologies	Classical Solo Vocal Album	Grammy Award	Won
2021	Worlds Collide	Best Pangea	InterContinental Music Awards	Won
2020	Illuminance	Best Female Vocalist	Global Music Awards	Won
2020	Compassion	Best New Age Album	Independent Music Award	Won
2020	Sangeeta Kuar Honored	Inductee Indie Music "Hall of Fame"	Indie Music Channel	Won
2020	Illuminance	Best Vocal Album	Zone Music Award	Won
2020	Compassion	Album of the Year	Zone Music Awards	Won
2019	Compassion	Best Classical Artist	Radio Music Award	Won
2019	Rise Up	Best New Age Song	Radio Music Award	Won
2019	May the Long Time Sun	Best New Age Artist	Radio Music Awards	Won
2019	Rise Up	Best New Age Song	Hollywood Media in Music Award	Nominated
2019	Ardas Bhaee	Outstanding Music Video	Producers Choice Honors	Won
2019	Compassion	Best Female Classical Artist	Indie Music Channel	Nominated
2019	Mirrors	Best New Female Artist of the Year	Indie Music Channel	Won
2019	Mother Earth	Best New Age Song	Indie Music Channel	Won
2019	I'm Not Gonna Break	Best New Age Video	Indie Music Channel	Won
2017	Ascension – Niguma Volume 2/The Mantra Project	Winner	Global Peace Song Award	Won
2016	Niguma	Grand Prize	Peace Song Award	Won
2016	Ardas Bhaee	Best Music Video	Peace Song Award "	Won
2016	Let Me Weep	Best Classical / Opera Song	Peace Song Award"	Won

== See also ==
- Asian Americans in arts and entertainment
- List of Grammy Award winners and nominees by country
