= 67th Annual Grammy Awards =

2025 US music awards ceremony

- Date: February 2, 2025
- Location: Crypto.com Arena; Los Angeles, California
- Hosted by: Trevor Noah

Highlights
- Most awards: Kendrick Lamar (5)
- Most nominations: Beyoncé (11)
- Website: www.grammy.com

Television/radio coverage
- Network: CBS; Paramount+
- Viewership: 15.4 million

The 67th Annual Grammy Awards honored the best recordings, compositions, and artists from September 16, 2023, to August 30, 2024, as chosen by the members of the Recording Academy, on February 2, 2025. In its 22nd year at Crypto.com Arena in Los Angeles, the main ceremony was broadcast on CBS and available to stream on Paramount+. It was preceded by the premiere ceremony at the Peacock Theater, starting at 12:30 p.m. PT. Nominations were announced through a YouTube livestream on November 8, 2024. The South African comedian Trevor Noah hosted the ceremony for the fifth consecutive time.

Kendrick Lamar's "Not Like Us" swept all five of its nominations, which included Record of the Year and Song of the Year, tying with "Up, Up and Away" to become the joint-most decorated song in Grammy Awards history. He became the second rap artist to win both awards, after Childish Gambino in 2019. Beyoncé received the most nominations at the ceremony with eleven and won three awards, including Album of the Year and Best Country Album for Cowboy Carter. She became the first Black artist to win Best Country Album and the first Black woman to win Album of the Year since Lauryn Hill in 1999. Chappell Roan took home Best New Artist, and Sierra Ferrell swept the American roots categories, winning all four of her nominations. Best New Artist nominee Doechii won Best Rap Album for Alligator Bites Never Heal, becoming the third woman to win the award after Hill (with the Fugees) in 1997 and Cardi B in 2019. Other three-time winners included Charli XCX and St. Vincent. Other artists that led nominations included Charli XCX and Post Malone with eight each, and Kendrick Lamar and Billie Eilish with seven each.

== Background ==
For the 2025 ceremony, the Recording Academy announced several changes for different categories and updates on eligibility rules. No new categories were introduced for the first time in four years. In an urgent letter to the 12,000 voting members of the Recording Academy, chief executive officer (CEO) Harvey Mason Jr. urged them to cast their votes with "purpose, intention, and integrity" and without "bias, grudge-holding, or careless voting".

Discussions were held to either postpone the ceremony and all of its ancillary events or pivot the broadcast to a fundraiser due to the series of wildfires affecting Southern California. In a joint statement, Mason Jr. and Tammy Hurt, the chair of the Recording Academy's board of trustees, confirmed that the ceremony would proceed as planned "in close coordination with local authorities to ensure public safety and responsible use of area resources." This edition, however, carried a "renewed sense of purpose: raising additional funds to support wildfire relief efforts and honoring the bravery and dedication of first responders who risk their lives to protect ours."

During the broadcast, some commercial airtime was donated to help small businesses affected by the wildfires. Host Trevor Noah announced this initiative and special guests appeared in the commercials. Featured businesses included Orla Floral Studio of Altadena with an appearance by Doja Cat, Two Dragons Martial Arts of Altadena with an appearance by Charlie Puth, Rhythms Of The Village of Altadena with an appearance by Anderson .Paak, Paliskates Skate Shop in Pacific Palisades with an appearance by Avril Lavigne, and the L.A. Lost Stuffy Project with an appearance by the Jonas Brothers.

Additionally, high school choir students from Pasadena Waldorf School in Altadena and Palisades Charter High School in the Pacific Palisades, both of which were damaged in the wildfires, sang backup vocals during the Stevie Wonder and Herbie Hancock performance of "We Are the World."

=== Category changes ===
- Best Remixed Recording, Non-Classical was moved from the Production, Engineering, Composition & Arrangement Field to the Pop & Dance/Electronic Field.
- Best Pop Dance Recording was renamed to Best Dance Pop Recording.
- Best Dance/Electronic Music Album was renamed to Best Dance/Electronic Album. Its category criteria was amended to establish that albums must consist of at least 50% Dance/Electronic recordings to qualify.
- Conjunto music will now be recognized under Best Regional Roots Music Album, instead of Best Música Mexicana Album (Including Tejano).
- Best Score Soundtrack for Video Games and Other Interactive Media was amended to establish a qualification that more than 50% of the music on an otherwise eligible recording must be derived from new episodes or new programming released during the Grammy eligibility year for which it entered.
- Best Song for Social Change, a Special Merit Award, was renamed to the Harry Belafonte Best Song for Social Change Award. It will now be recognized as a CEO's Merit Award, with the finalists and recipients selected annually by a committee composed of a community of peers dedicated to "artistic expression, the craft of songwriting, and the power of songs to affect social change."

=== Criteria amendments ===
- All eligibly-certified featured artists with less than 50% of playing time will be awarded a Winners' Certificate for all genre album categories. This rule does not apply to Best Musical Theater Album or the General Field and Craft categories.
- The annual fee media companies must pay to enter a recording in the online entry process was increased to $180.
- Criteria for Best Traditional R&B Performance was amended to "more accurately represent recordings that embody the classical elements of R&B/soul music, distinguishing them from contemporary interpretations of the genre."
- Criteria for Best Traditional Pop Vocal Album was amended to expand the category by "broadening its scope and welcoming more entries from the musical theater community." Its album eligibility criteria was also updated, requiring that albums must contain more than 75% of newly recorded (previously unreleased) performances.
- Criteria for Best Children's Music Album was amended with a requirement for lyrics and English-language translations to be included in entry submissions. An intended audience range was also defined as "infant to 12 years old".
- Submission guidelines for Songwriter of the Year, Non-Classical were amended with the hopes of allowing a "wider representation of the songwriter community", with the minimum submission threshold in which a songwriter is credited as a songwriter or co-writer (not a primary or featured artist or producer) being reduced from five to four songs. The additional number of songs a songwriter may enter in which they are also credited as a primary or featured artist, or any other supporting role was also increased from four to five.

== Performers ==
=== Premiere ceremony ===
Performers for the premiere ceremony were announced on January 29, 2025.

List of performers at the premiere ceremony
Artist(s)	Song(s)
Yolanda Adams Wayne Brady Deborah Cox Scott Hoying Angélique Kidjo Taj Mahal	"Bridge over Troubled Water"
Joe Bonamassa	"Twenty-Four Hour Blues"
Muni Long	"Made for Me"
Béla Fleck	"Rhapsody in Blue"
Joyce DiDonato Renée Fleming Kelli O'Hara Kevin Puts	"All Along"

=== Main ceremony ===
The first batch of main ceremony performers, which included Billie Eilish, Chappell Roan, Charli XCX, and Sabrina Carpenter, were announced on January 24, 2025. The second batch of performers, which included Chris Martin, Cynthia Erivo, Janelle Monáe, and Stevie Wonder, were announced on January 29.

List of performers at the 67th Annual Grammy Awards
Artist(s)	Song(s)
Dawes John Legend Sheryl Crow Brad Paisley Brittany Howard St. Vincent	Tribute to Los Angeles "I Love L.A."
Billie Eilish Finneas O'Connell	"Birds of a Feather"
Sabrina Carpenter	"Espresso" "Please Please Please"
Chappell Roan	"Pink Pony Club"
Khruangbin Benson Boone Doechii DJ Miss Milan Teddy Swims Shaboozey Raye	Best New Artist Medley "May Ninth" "Beautiful Things" "Catfish" "Denial Is a River" "Lose Control" "Good News" "A Bar Song (Tipsy)" "Oscar Winning Tears"
Bruno Mars Lady Gaga	Tribute to Los Angeles "California Dreamin'"
The Weeknd Playboi Carti	Surprise Performance "Cry for Me" "Timeless"
Herbie Hancock Cynthia Erivo Lainey Wilson Jacob Collier Stevie Wonder Janelle Monáe	Tribute to Quincy Jones "Killer Joe" "Fly Me to the Moon" "Let the Good Times Roll" "Bluesette" "We Are the World" "Don't Stop 'Til You Get Enough"
Chris Martin Grace Bowers	In Memoriam: "All My Love"
Shakira	"Ojos Así" "Shakira: Bzrp Music Sessions, Vol. 53"
Charli XCX	"Von Dutch" "Guess"

Additionally, the music video for "Abracadabra" by Lady Gaga premiered during a commercial break in the broadcast.

== Presenters ==
Justin Tranter was announced as the host of the Premiere Ceremony at the Peacock Theater on January 29, 2025, alongside the list of presenters.

Taylor Swift was announced as a presenter for the main ceremony and telecast at Crypto.com Arena on January 30.

Premiere ceremony
- Justin Tranter – host
- Rhiannon Giddens
- Anoushka Shankar
- Jimmy Jam
- Scott Hoying
- Bob Clearmountain
- Queen Sheba
- Wayne Brady
Main ceremony
- Cardi B – presented Best Rap Album
- Jim Gaffigan – introduced Anthony Kiedis and Chad Smith
- Anthony Kiedis and Chad Smith – presented Best Pop Vocal Album
- Olivia Rodrigo – introduced Chappell Roan
- Taylor Swift – presented Best Country Album
- Victoria Monét – presented Best New Artist
- Harvey Mason Jr. – introduced The Weeknd
- Jennifer Lopez – presented Best Latin Pop Album
- Will Smith – introduced Quincy Jones tribute
- SZA – presented Best Pop Duo/Group Performance
- Miley Cyrus – presented Record of the Year
- Gloria Estefan – introduced Shakira
- Queen Latifah – introduced Dr. Dre Global Impact Award
- Diana Ross – presented Song of the Year
- Anthony Marrone and Los Angeles County Fire Department firefighters – presented Album of the Year

== Winners and nominees ==
First round voting took place from October 4 to October 15, 2024. The nominees were announced by Brandy Clark, Kirk Franklin, David Frost, Robert Gordon, Kylie Minogue, Victoria Monét, Gaby Moreno, Deanie Parker, Mark Ronson, Ben Platt, and Hayley Williams on November 8 in a livestream on the official Grammy YouTube channel. Final round voting then took place from December 12, 2024, to January 3, 2025, ahead of when the winners were revealed during the Grammy Premiere Ceremony and telecast on February 2.

Beyoncé received the most nominations with eleven, which set a new one-year record for nominations by a female artist. She previously shared the record with Lauryn Hill, who earned 10 nominations at the 1999 ceremony, and matched it herself in 2010. With a career total of 99 nominations, Beyoncé became the most nominated artist in Grammy history, breaking a tie with her husband Jay-Z. Taylor Swift is the first woman to earn seven career nominations for Album of the Year with The Tortured Poets Department. "Now and Then" by the Beatles is the first song produced with the help of artificial intelligence to be nominated for a Grammy. Anitta's Funk Generation is the first funk carioca album to be nominated for a Grammy. Sabrina Carpenter and Chappell Roan became the fourteenth and fifteenth artists in history who have earned Grammy nominations in all four main General Field categories in one night. Charli XCX and Post Malone were added to the nominees for Best Recording Package for their respective albums on December 20. At 100 years of age, former U.S. president Jimmy Carter became the oldest nominee ever; he won Best Audio Book, Narration & Storytelling Recording for the fourth time, more than any other recipient to date, which would have made him the oldest winner ever if not for his death in December 2024.

Winners appear first and highlighted in bold.

=== General Field ===
General Field
**Record of the Year**: **"Not Like Us" – Kendrick Lamar**; **Sean Momberger, Mustard & Sounwave, producers; Ray Charles Brown Jr. & Johnathan Turner, engineers/mixers; Nicolas de Porcel, mastering engineer**; "Now and Then" – The Beatles; Giles Martin & Paul McCartney, producers; Geoff Emerick, Steve Genewick, Jon Jacobs, Greg McAllister, Steve Orchard, Keith Smith, Mark "Spike" Stent & Bruce Sugar, engineers/mixers; Miles Showell, mastering engineer; "Texas Hold 'Em" – Beyoncé; Beyoncé, Nathan Ferraro, Killah B & Raphael Saadiq, producers; Hotae Alexander Jang, Alex Nibley & Stuart White, engineers/mixers; Colin Leonard, mastering engineer; "Espresso" – Sabrina Carpenter; Julian Bunetta, producer; Julian Bunetta & Jeff Gunnell, engineers/mixers; Nathan Dantzler, mastering engineer; "360" – Charli XCX; Cirkut & A. G. Cook, producers; Cirkut & Manny Marroquin, engineers/mixers; Idania Valencia, mastering engineer; "Birds of a Feather" – Billie Eilish; Finneas & Billie Eilish, producers; Thom Beemer, Jon Castelli, Billie Eilish, Aron Forbes, Brad Lauchert, Finneas & Chaz Sexton, engineers/mixers; Dale Becker, mastering engineer; "Good Luck, Babe!" – Chappell Roan; Daniel Nigro, producer; Mitch McCarthy & Daniel Nigro, engineers/mixers; Randy Merrill, mastering engineer; "Fortnight" – Taylor Swift featuring Post Malone; Jack Antonoff, Louis Bell & Taylor Swift, producers; Louis Bell, Bryce Bordone, Serban Ghenea, Sean Hutchinson, Oli Jacobs, Michael Riddleberger & Laura Sisk, engineers/mixers; Randy Merrill, mastering engineer
**Album of the Year**: **Cowboy Carter – Beyoncé**; **Beyoncé, Terius "The-Dream" Gesteelde-Diamant & Dave Hamelin, producers; Matheus Braz, Brandon Harding, Hotae Alexander Jang, Dani Pampuri & Stuart White, engineers/mixers; Ryan Beatty, Beyoncé, Camaron Ochs, Terius "The-Dream" Gesteelde-Diamant, Dave Hamelin, S. Carter & Raphael Saadiq, songwriters; Colin Leonard, mastering engineer**; New Blue Sun – André 3000; André 3000 & Carlos Niño, producers; André 3000, Carlos Niño & Ken Oriole, engineers/mixers; André 3000, Surya Botofasina, Nate Mercereau & Carlos Niño, songwriters; Andy Kravitz, mastering engineer; Short n' Sweet – Sabrina Carpenter; Jack Antonoff, Julian Bunetta, Ian Kirkpatrick & John Ryan, producers; Jack Antonoff, Bryce Bordone, Julian Bunetta, Serban Ghenea, Jeff Gunnell, Oli Jacobs, Manny Marroquin, John Ryan & Laura Sisk, engineers/mixers; Amy Allen, Jack Antonoff, Julian Bunetta, Sabrina Carpenter, Ian Kirkpatrick, Julia Michaels & John Ryan, songwriters; Nathan Dantzler & Ruairi O'Flaherty, mastering engineers; Brat – Charli XCX; Charli XCX, Cirkut & A. G. Cook, producers; A. G. Cook, Tom Norris & Geoff Swan, engineers/mixers; Charlotte Aitchison, Henry Walter, Alexander Guy Cook, Finn Keane & Jonathan Christopher Shave, songwriters; Idania Valencia, mastering engineer; Djesse Vol. 4 – Jacob Collier; Jacob Collier, producer; Ben Bloomberg, Jacob Collier & Paul Pouwer, engineers/mixers; Jacob Collier, songwriter; Chris Allgood & Emily Lazar, mastering engineers; Hit Me Hard and Soft – Billie Eilish; Billie Eilish & Finneas, producers; Thom Beemer, Jon Castelli, Billie Eilish, Finneas, Aron Forbes, Brad Lauchert & Chaz Sexton, engineers/mixers; Billie Eilish O'Connell & Finneas O'Connell, songwriters; Dale Becker, mastering engineer; The Rise and Fall of a Midwest Princess – Chappell Roan; Daniel Nigro, producer; Mitch McCarthy & Daniel Nigro, engineers/mixers; Daniel Nigro & Kayleigh Rose Amstutz, songwriters; Randy Merrill, mastering engineer; The Tortured Poets Department – Taylor Swift; Jack Antonoff, Aaron Dessner & Taylor Swift, producers; Zem Audu, Bella Blasko, Bryce Bordone, Serban Ghenea, David Hart, Mikey Freedom Hart, Sean Hutchinson, Oli Jacobs, Jonathan Low, Michael Riddleberger, Christopher Rowe, Laura Sisk & Evan Smith, engineers/mixers; Jack Antonoff, Aaron Dessner & Taylor Swift, songwriters; Randy Merrill, mastering engineer
**Song of the Year**: **"Not Like Us"**; **Kendrick Lamar, songwriter (Kendrick Lamar)**; "A Bar Song (Tipsy)"; Sean Cook, Collins Obinna Chibueze & Nevin Sastry, songwriters (Shaboozey); "Birds of a Feather"; Billie Eilish O'Connell & Finneas O'Connell, songwriters (Billie Eilish); "Die with a Smile"; Dernst Emile II, James Fauntleroy, Lady Gaga, Bruno Mars & Andrew Watt, songwriters (Lady Gaga & Bruno Mars); "Fortnight"; Jack Antonoff, Austin Post & Taylor Swift, songwriters (Taylor Swift featuring Post Malone); "Good Luck, Babe!"; Kayleigh Rose Amstutz, Daniel Nigro & Justin Tranter, songwriters (Chappell Roan); "Please Please Please"; Amy Allen, Jack Antonoff & Sabrina Carpenter, songwriters (Sabrina Carpenter); "Texas Hold 'Em"; Brian Bates, Beyoncé, Atia Boggs, Elizabeth Lowell Boland, Megan Bülow, Nathan Ferraro & Raphael Saadiq, songwriters (Beyoncé)
**Best New Artist**: **Chappell Roan**; Benson Boone; Sabrina Carpenter; Doechii; Khruangbin; Raye; Shaboozey; Teddy Swims
**Producer of the Year, Non-Classical**: **Dan Nigro**; 1. **"Can't Catch Me Now" (From The Hunger Games: The Ballad of Songbirds & Snakes) (Olivia Rodrigo) (S)**; 2. **The Rise and Fall of a Midwest Princess (Chappell Roan) (A)**; 3. **"Girl I've Always Been" (Olivia Rodrigo) (T)**; 4. **"Good Luck, Babe!" (Chappell Roan) (S)**; 5. **"So American" (Olivia Rodrigo) (T)**; 6. **"Stranger" (Olivia Rodrigo) (T)**; Alissia; 1. "Bugs" (Jamila Woods) (T); 2. "Don't Matter" (Rae Khalil) (T); 3. "Honey" (BJ the Chicago Kid featuring Chlöe) (T); 4. "Irreplaceable (Interlude)" (Rae Khalil) (T); 5. "Is It Worth It" (Rae Khalil) (S); 6. "Love Takeover" (Lion Babe) (T); 7. "Spend the Night" (BJ the Chicago Kid and Coco Jones) (S); Dernst "D'Mile" Emile II; 1. Algorithm (Lucky Daye) (A); 2. "Bar Song" (Koe Wetzel) (T); 3. "Die with a Smile" (Lady Gaga and Bruno Mars) (S); 4. "HERicane" (Lucky Daye) (S); 5. "I Love U" (Usher) (T); 6. "One of Them Ones" (Usher) (T); 7. "Power of Two" (From Star Wars: The Acolyte) (Victoria Monét) (S); 8. "That's You" (Lucky Daye) (S); Ian Fitchuk; 1. "Amen" (Beyoncé) (S); 2. Angel Face (Stephen Sanchez) (A); 3. Deeper Well (Kacey Musgraves) (A); 4. Don't Forget Me (Maggie Rogers) (A); 5. "Lemon" (Still Woozy) (S); 6. "Oh, Gemini" (Role Model) (S); 7. "Peaceful Place" (Leon Bridges) (S); 8. "Redemption Song" (Leon Bridges) (S); 9. "Three Little Birds" (Kacey Musgraves) (S); Mustard; 1. Faith of a Mustard Seed (Mustard) (A); 2. "Not Like Us" (Kendrick Lamar) (S); 3. "Parking Lot" (Mustard and Travis Scott) (S)	**Songwriter of the Year, Non-Classical**: **Amy Allen**; 1. **"Chrome Cowgirl" (From Twisters: The Album) (Leon Bridges) (S)**; 2. **"Espresso" (Sabrina Carpenter) (S)**; 3. **"High Road" (Koe Wetzel featuring Jessie Murph) (S)**; 4. **"Please Please Please" (Sabrina Carpenter) (S)**; 5. **"Run for the Hills" (Tate McRae) (T)**; 6. **"Scared of My Guitar" (Olivia Rodrigo) (T)**; 7. **"Selfish" (Justin Timberlake) (S)**; 8. **"Sweet Dreams" (Koe Wetzel) (S)**; 9. **"Taste" (Sabrina Carpenter) (S)**; Jessi Alexander; 1. "Ain't No Love in Oklahoma" (From Twisters: The Album) (Luke Combs) (S); 2. "All I Ever Do is Leave" (Luke Combs) (T); 3. "Chevrolet" (Dustin Lynch featuring Jelly Roll) (S); 4. "Make Me a Mop" (Cody Johnson) (T); 5. "Never Left Me" (From Twisters: The Album) (Megan Moroney) (T); 6. "No Caller ID" (Megan Moroney) (T); 7. "Noah" (Megan Moroney) (T); 8. "Remember Him That Way" (Luke Combs) (T); 9. "Roulette on the Heart" (Conner Smith featuring Hailey Whitters) (S); Édgar Barrera; 1. "Atencion" (Iván Cornejo) (T); 2. "(Entre Paréntesis)" (Shakira and Grupo Frontera) (S); 3. "It Was Always You (Siempre Fuiste Tú)" (Carín León and Leon Bridges) (S); 4. "No Se Vale" (Camilo) (S); 5. "The One (Pero No Como Yo)" (Carín León and Kane Brown) (S); 6. "Por el Contrario" (Becky G, Ángela Aguilar and Leonardo Aguilar) (S); 7. "Si Antes Te Hubiera Conocido" (Karol G) (S); 8. "Sincere" (Khalid) (T); 9. "Tommy & Pamela" (Peso Pluma and Kenia Os) (S); Jessie Jo Dillon; 1. "Am I Okay?" (Megan Moroney) (S); 2. "Go To Hell" (Post Malone) (T); 3. "Heaven by Noon" (Megan Moroney) (T); 4. "Lies Lies Lies" (Morgan Wallen) (S); 5. "Messed Up as Me" (Keith Urban) (S); 6. "Never Left Me" (From Twisters: The Album) (Megan Moroney) (T); 7. "No Caller ID" (Megan Moroney) (T); 8. "Sorry Mom" (Kelsea Ballerini) (T); 9. "Two Hearts" (Post Malone) (T); Raye; 1. "Ask & You Shall Receive" (Rita Ora) (S); 2. "Because I Love You" (Halle) (T); 3. "Dear Ben, Pt. II" (Jennifer Lopez) (T); 4. "Genesis" (Raye) (S); 5. "Mother Nature" (Raye and Hans Zimmer) (T); 6. "Paralyzed" (Lucky Daye featuring Raye) (T); 7. "Riiverdance" (Beyoncé) (T); 8. "You're Hired" (Neiked featuring Ayra Starr) (S)

=== Pop & Dance/Electronic ===
Pop & Dance/Electronic Field
**Best Pop Solo Performance**: **"Espresso" – Sabrina Carpenter**; "Bodyguard" – Beyoncé; "Apple" – Charli XCX; "Birds of a Feather" – Billie Eilish; "Good Luck, Babe!" – Chappell Roan	**Best Pop Duo/Group Performance**: **"Die with a Smile" – Lady Gaga & Bruno Mars**; "Us" – Gracie Abrams featuring Taylor Swift; "Levii's Jeans" – Beyoncé featuring Post Malone; "Guess" – Charli XCX & Billie Eilish; "The Boy Is Mine" – Ariana Grande, Brandy & Monica
**Best Pop Vocal Album**: **Short n' Sweet – Sabrina Carpenter**; Hit Me Hard and Soft – Billie Eilish; Eternal Sunshine – Ariana Grande; The Rise and Fall of a Midwest Princess – Chappell Roan; The Tortured Poets Department – Taylor Swift	**Best Dance/Electronic Recording**: **"Neverender" – Justice and Tame Impala**; **Gaspard Augé & Xavier de Rosnay, producers; Gaspard Augé, Xavier de Rosnay, Damien Quintard & Vincent Taurelle, mixers**; "She's Gone, Dance On" – Disclosure; Guy Lawrence & Howard Lawrence, producers; Guy Lawrence, mixer; "Loved" – Four Tet; Kieran Hebden, producer; Kieran Hebden, mixer; "Leavemealone" – Fred Again and Baby Keem; Boo, Fred Again, Alex Gibson, Kieran Hebden, Loose, Skrillex & Sid Stone, producers; Fred Again & Jay Reynolds, mixers; "Witchy" – Kaytranada and Childish Gambino; Lauren D'Elia & Kaytranada, producers; Neal H Pogue, mixer
**Best Dance Pop Recording**: **"Von Dutch" – Charli XCX**; **Finn Keane, producer; Tom Norris, mixer**; "Make You Mine" – Madison Beer; Madison Beer & Leroy Clampitt, producers; Mitch McCarthy, mixer; "L'Amour de Ma Vie" (Over Now Extended Edit) – Billie Eilish; Billie Eilish & Finneas, producers; Jon Castelli & Aron Forbes, mixers; "Yes, And?" – Ariana Grande; Ariana Grande, Ilya & Max Martin, producers; Serban Ghenea, mixer; "Got Me Started" – Troye Sivan; Styalz Fuego & Ian Kirkpatrick, producers; Alex Ghenea, mixer	**Best Dance/Electronic Album**: **Brat – Charli XCX**; Three – Four Tet; Hyperdrama – Justice; Timeless – Kaytranada; Telos – Zedd
**Best Remixed Recording, Non-Classical**: **"Espresso" (Mark Ronson x FnZ Working Late remix) – FnZ & Mark Ronson, remixers (Sabrina Carpenter)**; "Alter Ego" (Kaytranada remix) – Kaytranada, remixer (Doechii featuring JT); "A Bar Song (Tipsy)" (remix) – David Guetta, remixer (Shaboozey & David Guetta); "Jah Sees Them" (Amapiano remix) – Alexx Antaeus, Footsteps & MeMyish, remixers (Julian Marley & Antaeus); "Von Dutch" – A.G. Cook, remixer (Charli XCX & A.G. Cook featuring Addison Rae)

=== Rock, Metal & Alternative ===
Rock, Metal & Alternative Field
**Best Rock Performance**: **"Now and Then" – The Beatles**; "Beautiful People (Stay High)" – The Black Keys; "The American Dream Is Killing Me" – Green Day; "Gift Horse" – Idles; "Dark Matter" – Pearl Jam; "Broken Man" – St. Vincent	**Best Metal Performance**: **"Mea Culpa (Ah! Ça ira!)" – Gojira, Marina Viotti & Victor Le Masne**; "Crown of Horns" – Judas Priest; "Suffocate" – Knocked Loose featuring Poppy; "Screaming Suicide" – Metallica; "Cellar Door" – Spiritbox
**Best Rock Song**: **"Broken Man" – Annie Clark, songwriter (St. Vincent)**; "Beautiful People (Stay High)" – Dan Auerbach, Patrick Carney, Beck Hansen & Daniel Nakamura, songwriters (The Black Keys); "Dark Matter" – Jeff Ament, Matt Cameron, Stone Gossard, Mike McCready, Eddie Vedder & Andrew Watt, songwriters (Pearl Jam); "Dilemma" – Billie Joe Armstrong, Tré Cool & Mike Dirnt, songwriters (Green Day); "Gift Horse" – Jon Beavis, Mark Bowen, Adam Devonshire, Lee Kiernan & Joe Talbot, songwriters (Idles)	**Best Rock Album**: **Hackney Diamonds – The Rolling Stones**; Happiness Bastards – The Black Crowes; Romance – Fontaines D.C.; Saviors – Green Day; Tangk – Idles; Dark Matter – Pearl Jam; No Name – Jack White
**Best Alternative Music Performance**: **"Flea" – St. Vincent**; "Neon Pill" – Cage the Elephant; "Song of the Lake" – Nick Cave and the Bad Seeds; "Starburster" – Fontaines D.C.; "Bye Bye" – Kim Gordon	**Best Alternative Music Album**: **All Born Screaming – St. Vincent**; Wild God – Nick Cave and the Bad Seeds; Charm – Clairo; The Collective – Kim Gordon; What Now – Brittany Howard

=== R&B, Rap & Spoken Word Poetry ===
R&B, Rap and Spoken Word Poetry Field
**Best R&B Performance**: **"Made for Me (Live on BET)" – Muni Long**; "Guidance" – Jhené Aiko; "Residuals" – Chris Brown; "Here We Go (Uh Oh)" – Coco Jones; "Saturn" – SZA	**Best Traditional R&B Performance**: **"That's You" – Lucky Daye**; "Wet" – Marsha Ambrosius; "Can I Have This Groove" – Kenyon Dixon; "No Lie" – Lalah Hathaway featuring Michael McDonald; "Make Me Forget" – Muni Long
**Best R&B Song**: **"Saturn" – Rob Bisel, Cian Ducrot, Carter Lang, Solána Rowe, Jared Solomon & Scott Zhang, songwriters (SZA)**; "After Hours" – Diovanna Frazier, Alex Goldblatt, Kehlani Parrish, Khris Riddick-Tynes & Daniel Upchurch, songwriters (Kehlani); "Burning" – Ronald Banful & Temilade Openiyi, songwriters (Tems); "Here We Go (Uh Oh)" – Sara Diamond, Sydney Floyd, Marisela Jackson, Courtney Jones, Carl McCormick & Kelvin Wooten, songwriters (Coco Jones); "Ruined Me" – Jeff Gitelman, Kareen Lomax, Priscilla Renea & Kevin Theodore, songwriters (Muni Long)	**Best Progressive R&B Album**: **So Glad to Know You – AverySunshine**; **Why Lawd? – NxWorries (Anderson .Paak & Knxwledge)**; En Route – Durand Bernarr; Bando Stone & the New World – Childish Gambino; Crash – Kehlani
**Best R&B Album**: **11:11 (Deluxe) – Chris Brown**; Vantablack – Lalah Hathaway; Revenge – Muni Long; Algorithm – Lucky Daye; Coming Home – Usher	**Best Rap Performance**: **"Not Like Us" – Kendrick Lamar**; "Enough (Miami)" – Cardi B; "When The Sun Shines Again" – Common & Pete Rock featuring Posdnuos; "Nissan Altima" – Doechii; "Houdini" – Eminem; "Like That" – Future, Metro Boomin & Kendrick Lamar; "Yeah Glo!" – GloRilla
**Best Melodic Rap Performance**: **"3:AM" – Rapsody featuring Erykah Badu**; "Kehlani" – Jordan Adetunji featuring Kehlani; "Spaghettii" – Beyoncé featuring Linda Martell & Shaboozey; "We Still Don't Trust You" – Future, Metro Boomin & The Weeknd; "Big Mama" – Latto	**Best Rap Song**: **"Not Like Us" – Kendrick Lamar, songwriter (Kendrick Lamar)**; "Asteroids" – Marlanna Evans, songwriter (Rapsody featuring Hit-Boy); "Carnival" – Jordan Carter, Raul Cubina, Grant Dickinson, Tyrone Griffin Jr., Samuel Lindley, Nasir Pemberton, Dimitri Roger, Kanye West & Mark Karl Stolinski Williams, songwriters (¥$: Kanye West & Ty Dolla Sign featuring Rich the Kid & Playboi Carti); "Like That" – Kendrick Lamar Duckworth, Kobe "ByKobe" Hood, Leland Wayne & Nayvadius Wilburn, songwriters (Future & Metro Boomin featuring Kendrick Lamar); "Yeah Glo!" – Ronnie Jackson, Jacquez Lowe, Timothy McKibbins, Kevin Andre Price, Julius Rivera III & Gloria Woods, songwriters (GloRilla)
**Best Rap Album**: **Alligator Bites Never Heal – Doechii**; Might Delete Later – J. Cole; The Auditorium, Vol. 1 – Common & Pete Rock; The Death of Slim Shady (Coup De Grâce) – Eminem; We Don't Trust You – Future & Metro Boomin	**Best Spoken Word Poetry Album**: **The Heart, The Mind, The Soul – Tank and the Bangas**; Civil Writes: The South Got Something to Say – Queen Sheba; Concrete & Whiskey Act II Part 1: A Bourbon 30 Series – Omari Hardwick; Good M.U.S.I.C. Universe Sonic Sinema Episode 1: In the Beginning Was the Word – Malik Yusef; The Seven Number Ones – Mad Skillz

=== Jazz, Traditional Pop, Contemporary Instrumental & Musical Theater ===
Jazz, Traditional Pop, Contemporary Instrumental & Musical Theater Field
**Best Jazz Performance**: **"Twinkle Twinkle Little Me" – Samara Joy featuring Sullivan Fortner**; "Walk with Me, Lord (SOUND | SPIRIT)" – The Baylor Project; "Phoenix Reimagined (Live)" – Lakecia Benjamin featuring Randy Brecker, Jeff "Tain" Watts & John Scofield; "Juno" – Chick Corea & Béla Fleck; "Little Fears" – Dan Pugach Big Band featuring Nicole Zuraitis & Troy Roberts	**Best Jazz Vocal Album**: **A Joyful Holiday – Samara Joy**; Journey in Black – Christie Dashiell; Wildflowers Vol. 1 – Kurt Elling & Sullivan Fortner; Milton + Esperanza – Milton Nascimento & Esperanza Spalding; My Ideal – Catherine Russell & Sean Mason
**Best Jazz Instrumental Album**: **Remembrance – Chick Corea & Béla Fleck**; Owl Song – Ambrose Akinmusire featuring Bill Frisell & Herlin Riley; Beyond This Place – Kenny Barron featuring Kiyoshi Kitagawa, Johnathan Blake, Immanuel Wilkins & Steve Nelson; Phoenix Reimagined (Live) – Lakecia Benjamin; Solo Game – Sullivan Fortner	**Best Large Jazz Ensemble Album**: **Bianca Reimagined: Music for Paws and Persistence – Dan Pugach Big Band**; Returning to Forever – John Beasley & Frankfurt Radio Big Band; And So It Goes – The Clayton-Hamilton Jazz Orchestra; Walk a Mile in My Shoe – Orrin Evans & The Captain Black Big Band; Golden City – Miguel Zenón
**Best Latin Jazz Album**: **Cubop Lives! – Luques Curtis, Zaccai Curtis, Willie Martinez, Camilo Molina & Reinaldo de Jesus**; Spain Forever Again – Michel Camilo & Tomatito; COLLAB – Hamilton de Holanda & Gonzalo Rubalcaba; Time and Again – Eliane Elias; El Trio: Live in Italy – Horacio "El Negro" Hernández, John Beasley & José Gola; Cuba and Beyond – Chucho Valdés & Royal Quartet; As I Travel – Donald Vega featuring Lewis Nash, John Patitucci & Luisito Quintero	**Best Alternative Jazz Album**: **No More Water: The Gospel of James Baldwin – Meshell Ndegeocello**; Night Reign – Arooj Aftab; New Blue Sun – André 3000; Code Derivation – Robert Glasper; Foreverland – Keyon Harrold
**Best Traditional Pop Vocal Album**: **Visions – Norah Jones**; À Fleur De Peau – Cyrille Aimée; Good Together – Lake Street Dive; Impossible Dream – Aaron Lazar; Christmas Wish – Gregory Porter	**Best Contemporary Instrumental Album**: **Plot Armor – Taylor Eigsti**; Rhapsody in Blue – Béla Fleck; Orchestras (Live) – Bill Frisell featuring Alexander Hanson, Brussels Philharmonic, Rudy Royston & Thomas Morgan; Mark – Mark Guiliana; Speak to Me – Julian Lage
**Best Musical Theater Album**: **Hell's Kitchen – Shoshana Bean, Brandon Victor Dixon, Kecia Lewis & Maleah Joi Moon, principal vocalists; Adam Blackstone, Alicia Keys & Tom Kitt, producers (Alicia Keys, composer & lyricist) (Original Broadway Cast)**; Merrily We Roll Along – Jonathan Groff, Lindsay Mendez & Daniel Radcliffe, principal vocalists; David Caddick, Joel Fram, Maria Friedman & David Lai, producers (Stephen Sondheim, composer & lyricist) (New Broadway Cast); The Notebook – John Clancy, Carmel Dean, Kurt Deutsch, Derik Lee, Kevin McCollum & Ingrid Michaelson, producers; Ingrid Michaelson, composer & lyricist (Original Broadway Cast); The Outsiders – Joshua Boone, Brent Comer, Brody Grant & Sky Lakota-Lynch, principal vocalists; Zach Chance, Jonathan Clay, Matt Hinkley, Justin Levine & Lawrence Manchester, producers; Zach Chance, Jonathan Clay & Justin Levine, composers/lyricists (Original Broadway Cast); Suffs – Andrea Grody, Dean Sharenow & Shaina Taub, producers; Shaina Taub, composer & lyricist (Original Broadway Cast); The Wiz – Wayne Brady, Deborah Cox, Nichelle Lewis & Avery Wilson, principal vocalists; Joseph Joubert, Allen René Louis & Lawrence Manchester, producers (Charlie Smalls, composer & lyricist) (2024 Broadway Cast Recording)

=== Country & American Roots ===
Country & American Roots Field
**Best Country Solo Performance**: **"It Takes a Woman" – Chris Stapleton**; "16 Carriages" – Beyoncé; "I Am Not Okay" – Jelly Roll; "The Architect" – Kacey Musgraves; "A Bar Song (Tipsy)" – Shaboozey	**Best Country Duo/Group Performance**: **"II Most Wanted" – Beyoncé and Miley Cyrus**; "Cowboys Cry Too" – Kelsea Ballerini and Noah Kahan; "Break Mine" – Brothers Osborne; "Bigger Houses" – Dan + Shay; "I Had Some Help" – Post Malone featuring Morgan Wallen
**Best Country Song**: **"The Architect" – Shane McAnally, Kacey Musgraves & Josh Osborne, songwriters (Kacey Musgraves)**; "A Bar Song (Tipsy)" – Sean Cook, Collins Obinna Chibueze & Nevin Sastry, songwriters (Shaboozey); "I Am Not Okay" – Casey Brown, Jason DeFord, Ashley Gorley & Taylor Phillips, songwriters (Jelly Roll); "I Had Some Help" – Louis Bell, Ashley Gorley, Hoskins, Austin Post, Ernest Smith, Ryan Vojtesak, Morgan Wallen & Chandler Paul Walters, songwriters (Post Malone featuring Morgan Wallen); "Texas Hold 'Em" – Brian Bates, Beyoncé, Atia Boggs, Elizabeth Lowell Boland, Megan Bülow, Nathan Ferraro & Raphael Saadiq, songwriters (Beyoncé)	**Best Country Album**: **Cowboy Carter – Beyoncé**; F-1 Trillion – Post Malone; Deeper Well – Kacey Musgraves; Higher – Chris Stapleton; Whirlwind – Lainey Wilson
**Best American Roots Performance**: **"Lighthouse" – Sierra Ferrell**; "Blame It on Eve" – Shemekia Copeland; "Nothing in Rambling" – The Fabulous Thunderbirds featuring Bonnie Raitt, Keb' Mo', Taj Mahal & Mick Fleetwood; "The Ballad of Sally Anne" – Rhiannon Giddens	**Best Americana Performance**: **"American Dreaming" – Sierra Ferrell**; "Ya Ya" – Beyoncé; "Subtitles" – Madison Cunningham; "Don't Do Me Good" – Madi Diaz featuring Kacey Musgraves; "Runaway Train" – Sarah Jarosz; "Empty Trainload of Sky" – Gillian Welch & David Rawlings
**Best American Roots Song**: **"American Dreaming" – Sierra Ferrell & Melody Walker, songwriters (Sierra Ferrell)**; "Ahead of the Game" – Mark Knopfler, songwriter (Mark Knopfler); "All in Good Time" – Sam Beam, songwriter (Iron & Wine featuring Fiona Apple); "All My Friends" – Aoife O'Donovan, songwriter (Aoife O'Donovan); "Blame It on Eve" – John Hahn & Will Kimbrough, songwriters (Shemekia Copeland)	**Best Americana Album**: **Trail of Flowers – Sierra Ferrell**; The Other Side – T Bone Burnett; $10 Cowboy – Charley Crockett; Polaroid Lovers – Sarah Jarosz; No One Gets Out Alive – Maggie Rose; Tigers Blood – Waxahatchee
**Best Bluegrass Album**: **Live Vol. 1 – Billy Strings**; I Built a World – Bronwyn Keith-Hynes; Songs of Love and Life – The Del McCoury Band; No Fear – Sister Sadie; Earl Jam – Tony Trischka; Dan Tyminski: Live from the Ryman – Dan Tyminski	**Best Traditional Blues Album**: **Swingin' Live at The Church in Tulsa – The Taj Mahal Sextet**; Hill Country Love – Cedric Burnside; Struck Down – The Fabulous Thunderbirds; One Guitar Woman – Sue Foley; Sam's Place – Little Feat
**Best Contemporary Blues Album**: **Mileage – Ruthie Foster**; Blues Deluxe Vol. 2 – Joe Bonamassa; Blame It On Eve – Shemekia Copeland; Friendlytown – Steve Cropper & The Midnight Hour; The Fury – Antonio Vergara	**Best Folk Album**: **Woodland – Gillian Welch & David Rawlings**; American Patchwork Quartet – American Patchwork Quartet; Weird Faith – Madi Diaz; Bright Future – Adrianne Lenker; All My Friends – Aoife O'Donovan
**Best Regional Roots Music Album**: **Kuini – Kalani Pe'a**; 25 Back to My Roots – Sean Ardoin and Kreole Rock and Soul; Live at the 2024 New Orleans Jazz & Heritage Festival – Big Chief Monk Boudreaux & The Golden Eagles featuring J'Wan Boudreaux; Live at the 2024 New Orleans Jazz & Heritage Festival – New Breed Brass Band featuring Trombone Shorty; Stories from The Battlefield – The Rumble featuring Chief Joseph Boudreaux Jr.

=== Gospel & Contemporary Christian ===
Gospel & Contemporary Christian Field
**Best Gospel Performance/Song**: **"One Hallelujah" – Tasha Cobbs Leonard, Erica Campbell & Israel Houghton featuring Jonathan McReynolds & Jekalyn Carr**; **G. Morris Coleman, Israel Houghton, Kenneth Leonard Jr., Tasha Cobbs Leonard & Naomi Raine, songwriters**; "Church Doors" – Yolanda Adams; Sir William James Baptist & Donald Lawrence, songwriters; "Hold On (Live)" – Ricky Dillard; "Holy Hands" – DOE; Jesse Paul Barrera, Jeffrey Castro Bernat, Dominique Jones, Timothy Ferguson, Kelby Shavon Johnson Jr., Jonathan McReynolds, Rickey Slikk Muzik Offord & Juan Winans, songwriters; "Yesterday" – Melvin Crispell III	**Best Contemporary Christian Music Performance/Song**: **"That's My King" – CeCe Winans**; **Taylor Agan, Kellie Gamble, Lloyd Nicks & Jess Russ, songwriters**; "Firm Foundation (He Won't)" – Honor & Glory featuring Disciple; "Holy Forever (Live)" – Bethel Music & Jenn Johnson featuring CeCe Winans; "In the Name of Jesus" – JWLKRS Worship & Maverick City Music featuring Chandler Moore; Austin Armstrong, Ran Jackson, Chandler Moore, Sajan Nauriyal, Ella Schnacky, Noah Schnacky & Ilya Toshinskiy, songwriters; "In the Room" – Maverick City Music, Naomi Raine & Chandler Moore featuring Tasha Cobbs Leonard; G. Morris Coleman, Tasha Cobbs Leonard & Naomi Raine, songwriters; "Praise" – Elevation Worship featuring Brandon Lake, Chris Brown & Chandler Moore; Pat Barrett, Chris Brown, Cody Carnes, Steven Furtick, Brandon Lake & Chandler Moore, songwriters
**Best Gospel Album**: **More Than This – CeCe Winans**; Choirmaster II (Live) – Ricky Dillard; Covered Vol. 1 – Melvin Crispell III; Father's Day – Kirk Franklin; Still Karen – Karen Clark Sheard	**Best Contemporary Christian Music Album**: **Heart of a Human – DOE**; Coat of Many Colors – Brandon Lake; Child of God – Forrest Frank; The Maverick Way Complete – Maverick City Music, Naomi Raine & Chandler Moore; When Wind Meets Fire – Elevation Worship
**Best Roots Gospel Album**: **Church – Cory Henry**; Loving You – The Nelons; Rhapsody – The Harlem Gospel Travelers; The Gospel According to Mark – Mark D. Conklin; The Gospel Sessions, Vol 2 – Authentic Unlimited

=== Latin, Global, African, Reggae & New Age, Ambient or Chant ===
Latin, Global, African, Reggae & New Age, Ambient or Chant Field
**Best Latin Pop Album**: **Las Mujeres Ya No Lloran – Shakira**; Funk Generation – Anitta; El Viaje – Luis Fonsi; García – Kany García; Orquídeas – Kali Uchis	**Best Música Urbana Album**: **Las Letras Ya No Importan – Residente**; Nadie Sabe Lo Que Va a Pasar Mañana – Bad Bunny; Rayo – J Balvin; Ferxxocalipsis – Feid; Att. – Young Miko
**Best Latin Rock or Alternative Album**: **¿Quién Trae las Cornetas? – Rawayana**; Compita del Destino – El David Aguilar; Pa' Tu Cuerpa – Cimafunk; Autopoiética – Mon Laferte; Grasa – Nathy Peluso	**Best Música Mexicana Album (including Tejano)**: **Boca Chueca, Vol. 1 – Carín León**; Diamantes – Chiquis; Éxodo – Peso Pluma; De Lejitos – Jessi Uribe
**Best Tropical Latin Album**: **Alma, Corazón y Salsa (Live at Gran Teatro Nacional) – Tony Succar & Mimy Succar**; Muevense – Marc Anthony; Bailar – Sheila E.; Radio Güira – Juan Luis Guerra; Vacilón Santiaguero – Kiki Valera	**Best Global Music Performance**: **"Bemba Colorá" – Sheila E. featuring Gloria Estefan & Mimy Succar**; "Raat Ki Rani" – Arooj Aftab; "A Rock Somewhere" – Jacob Collier featuring Anoushka Shankar & Varijashree Venugopal; "Rise" – Rocky Dawuni; "Sunlight to My Soul" – Angélique Kidjo featuring Soweto Gospel Choir; "Kashira" – Masa Takumi featuring Ron Korb, Noshir Mody & Dale Edward Chung
**Best African Music Performance**: **"Love Me JeJe" – Tems**; "Tomorrow" – Yemi Alade; "MMS" – Asake & Wizkid; "Sensational" – Chris Brown featuring Davido & Lojay; "Higher" – Burna Boy	**Best Global Music Album**: **Alkebulan II – Matt B featuring Royal Philharmonic Orchestra**; Paisajes – Ciro Hurtado; Heis – Rema; Historias De Un Flamenco – Antonio Rey; Born in the Wild – Tems
**Best Reggae Album**: **Bob Marley: One Love - Music Inspired By The Film (Deluxe) — Various Artists**; Take It Easy — Collie Buddz; Party With Me — Vybz Kartel; Never Gets Late Here — Shenseea; Evolution — The Wailers	**Best New Age, Ambient or Chant Album**: **Triveni — Wouter Kellerman, Eru Matsumoto & Chandrika Tandon**; Break of Dawn — Ricky Kej; Visions of Sounds De Luxe — Chris Redding; Opus — Ryuichi Sakamoto; Chapter II: How Dark It Is Before Dawn — Anoushka Shankar; Warriors of Light — Radhika Vekaria

=== Children's, Comedy, Audio Book Narration & Storytelling, Visual Media & Music Video/Film ===
Children's, Comedy, Audio Book Narration & Storytelling, Visual Media & Music Video/Film Field
**Best Children's Album**: **Lucky Diaz and the Family Jam Band – Brillo, Brillo!**; Lucy Kalantari & The Jazz Cats – Creciendo; John Legend – My Favorite Dream; Rock for Children – Solid Rock Revival; Divinity Roxx and Divi Roxx Kids – World Wide Playdate	**Best Comedy Album**: **The Dreamer – Dave Chappelle**; Armageddon – Ricky Gervais; The Prisoner – Jim Gaffigan; Someday You'll Die – Nikki Glaser; Where Was I – Trevor Noah
**Best Audio Book, Narration & Storytelling Recording**: **Last Sundays in Plains: A Centennial Celebration – Jimmy Carter**; All You Need Is Love: The Beatles In Their Own Words – Guy Oldfield; ...And Your Ass Will Follow – George Clinton; Behind the Seams: My Life in Rhinestones – Dolly Parton; My Name Is Barbra – Barbra Streisand	**Best Compilation Soundtrack for Visual Media**: **Maestro: Music by Leonard Bernstein – Bradley Cooper and Yannick Nézet-Séguin, artists; Bradley Cooper, Yannick Nézet-Séguin & Jason Ruder, compilation producers; Steven Gizicki, music supervisor**; The Color Purple – (Various Artists); Nick Baxter, Blitz Bazawule and Stephen Bray, compilation producers; Jordan Carroll and Morgan Rhodes, music supervisors; Deadpool & Wolverine – (Various Artists); Dave Jordan, Shawn Levy and Ryan Reynolds, compilation producers; Dave Jordan, music supervisor; Saltburn – (Various Artists); Emerald Fennell, compilation producer; Kirsten Lane, music supervisor; Twisters: The Album – (Various Artists); Ian Cripps, Brandon Davis, Joe Khoury and Kevin Weaver, compilation producers; Mike Knobloch and Rachel Levy, music supervisors
**Best Score Soundtrack Album for Visual Media**: **Dune: Part Two – Hans Zimmer**; American Fiction – Laura Karpman; Challengers – Trent Reznor and Atticus Ross; The Color Purple – Kris Bowers; Shōgun – Nick Chuba, Atticus Ross and Leopold Ross	**Best Score Soundtrack for Video Games and Other Interactive Media**: **Wizardry: Proving Grounds of the Mad Overlord – Winifred Phillips**; Avatar: Frontiers of Pandora – Pinar Toprak; God of War Ragnarök: Valhalla – Bear McCreary; Marvel's Spider-Man 2 – John Paesano; Star Wars Outlaws – Wilbert Roget II
**Best Song Written for Visual Media**: **"It Never Went Away" (from American Symphony)**; **Jon Batiste & Dan Wilson, songwriters (Jon Batiste)**; "Ain't No Love in Oklahoma" (from Twisters: The Album); Jessi Alexander, Luke Combs & Jonathan Singleton, songwriters (Luke Combs); "Better Place" (from Trolls Band Together); Amy Allen, Shellback, & Justin Timberlake, songwriters (NSYNC & Justin Timberlake); "Can't Catch Me Now" (from The Hunger Games: The Ballad of Songbirds & Snakes); Daniel Nigro & Olivia Rodrigo, songwriters (Olivia Rodrigo); "Love Will Survive" (from The Tattooist of Auschwitz); Walter Afanasieff, Charlie Midnight, Kara Talve, & Hans Zimmer, songwriters (Barbra Streisand)
**Best Music Video**: **"Not Like Us" – Kendrick Lamar**; **Dave Free & Kendrick Lamar, video directors; Jack Begert, Cornell Brown, Sam Canter, Jared Heinke, Jamie Rabineau & Anthony Saleh, video producers**; "Tailor Swif" – ASAP Rocky; Vania Heymann & Gal Muggia, video directors; Natan Schottenfels, video producer; "360" – Charli XCX; Aidan Zamiri, video director; Jami Arceo & Evan Thicke, video producers; "Houdini" – Eminem; Rich Lee, video director; Kathy Angstadt, Lisa Arianna & Justin Diener, video producers; "Fortnight" – Taylor Swift featuring Post Malone; Taylor Swift, video director; Jil Hardin, video producer	**Best Music Film**: **American Symphony – Jon Batiste**; **Matthew Heineman, video director; Lauren Domino, Matthew Heineman and Joedan Okun, video producers**; June – (June Carter Cash); Kristen Vaurio, video director; Josh Matas, Sarah Olson, Jason Owen, Mary Robertson and Kristen Vaurio, video producers; Kings from Queens – Run-DMC; Kirk Fraser, video director; Brian Hunt, Dan Goodman & William H. Masterson III, video producers; Stevie Van Zandt: Disciple – Steven Van Zandt; Bill Teck, video director; Robert Cotto, David Fisher & Bill Teck, video producers; The Greatest Night in Pop – (Various Artists); Bao Nguyen, video director; Bruce Eskowitz, George Hencken, Larry Klein, Julia Nottingham, Lionel Richie and Harriet Sternberg, video producers

=== Package, Notes & Historical ===
Package, Notes & Historical Field
**Best Historical Album**: **Centennial**; **Meagan Hennessey & Richard Martin, compilation producers; Richard Martin, mastering engineer (King Oliver's Creole Jazz Band and Various Artists)**; Diamonds and Pearls: Super Deluxe Edition; L. Londell McMillan, Charles F. Spicer Jr. & Duane Tudahl, compilation producers; Brad Blackwood, Bernie Grundman & Chris James, mastering engineers (Prince & The New Power Generation); Paul Robeson – Voice of Freedom: His Complete Columbia, RCA, His Master's Voice, and Victor Recordings; Tom Laskey, Shana L. Redmond, Susan Robeson & Robert Russ, compilation producers; Nancy Conforti & Andreas K. Meyer, mastering engineers (Paul Robeson); Pepito y Paquito; Pepe de Lucía & Javier Doria, compilation producers; Jesús Bola, mastering engineer (Pepe de Lucía And Paco De Lucía); The Sound of Music (Original Soundtrack Recording - Super Deluxe Edition); Mike Matessino & Mark Piro, compilation producers; Steve Genewick & Mike Matessino, mastering engineers (Rodgers & Hammerstein & Julie Andrews)	**Best Album Notes**: **Centennial**; **Ricky Riccardi, album notes writer (King Oliver's Creole Jazz Band & Various Artists)**; After Midnight; Tim Brooks, album notes writer (Ford Dabney's Syncopated Orchestra); The Carnegie Hall Concert; Lauren Du Graf, album notes writer (Alice Coltrane); John Culshaw — The Art of the Producer - The Early Years 1948-55; Dominic Fyfe, album notes writer (John Culshaw); SONtrack Original De La Película "Al Son De Beno"; Josh Kun, album notes writer (Various Artists)
**Best Recording Package**: **Brat**; **Charlotte Aitchison, Brent David Freaney & Imogene Strauss, art directors (Charli XCX)**; The Avett Brothers; Scott Avett, Jonny Black & Giorgia Sage, art directors (The Avett Brothers); Baker Hotel; Sarah Dodds & Shauna Dodds, art directors (William Clark Green); F-1 Trillion; Archie Lee Coates IV, Jeffrey Franklin, Bobby Greenleaf, Blossom Liu, Kylie McMahon, Austin Post & Ana Cecilia Thompson Motta, art directors (Post Malone); Hounds of Love (The Baskerville Edition); Kate Bush & Albert McIntosh, art directors (Kate Bush); Jug Band Millionaire; Andrew Wong & Julie Yeh, art directors (The Muddy Basin Ramblers); Pregnancy, Breakdown, and Disease; Lee Pei-Tzu, art director (iWhoiWhoo)	**Best Boxed or Special Limited Edition Package**: **Mind Games**; **Simon Hilton & Sean Ono Lennon, art directors (John Lennon)**; Half Living Things; Nick Azinas & Mike Hicks, art directors (Alpha Wolf); Hounds of Love (The Boxes of Lost at Sea); Kate Bush & Albert McIntosh, art directors (Kate Bush); In Utero; Doug Cunningham & Jason Noto, art directors (Nirvana); Unsuk Chin; Takahiro Kurashima & Marek Polewski, art directors (Unsuk Chin & Berliner Philharmoniker); We Blame Chicago; Rebeka Arce & Farbod Kokabi, art directors (90 Day Men)

=== Production, Engineering, Composition & Arrangement ===
Production, Engineering, Composition & Arrangement Field
**Producer of the Year, Classical**: **Elaine Martone**; 1. **Bartók: String Quartet No.3; Suite From 'The Miraculous Mandarin' (Franz Welser-Möst & The Cleveland Orchestra) (A)**; 2. **The Book Of Spells (Merian Ensemble) (A)**; 3. **Bruckner: Symphony No. 4 (Franz Welser-Möst & The Cleveland Orchestra) (A)**; 4. **Divine Mischief (Julian Bliss, J. Eric Wilson & Baylor University Wind Ensemble) (A)**; 5. **Joy! (John Morris Russell & Cincinnati Pops) (A)**; 6. **Prokofiev: Symphony No. 6 (Franz Welser-Möst & The Cleveland Orchestra) (A)**; 7. **Schubert: The Complete Impromptus (Gerardo Teissonnière) (A)**; 8. **Stranger At Home (Shachar Israel) (A)**; 9. **Tchaikovsky: Symphony No. 4 (Franz Welser-Möst & The Cleveland Orchestra) (A)**; Erica Brenner; 1. Biber: Mystery Sonatas (Alan Choo, Jeannette Sorrell & Apollo's Fire) (A); 2. Handel: Israel In Egypt (Jeannette Sorrell, Apollo's Singers & Apollo's Fire) (A); 3. Mozart: Piano Sonatas, Vols. 5 & 6 (Orli Shaham) (A); 4. Songs For A Friend - A Tribute To Trumpeter Ryan Anthony (Various Artists) (A); 5. Sonic Alchemy (YuEun Kim, Mina Gajić & Coleman Itzkoff) (A); Christoph Franke; 1. Beethoven: The Complete Symphonies (Antonello Manacorda & Kammerakademie Potsdam) (A); 2. Beethoven: Violin Sonatas Nos. 1, 5, 6 & 10 (Dénes Várjon & Antje Weithaas) (A); 3. Brahms, Viotti & Dvořák: Orchestral Works (Tanja Tetzlaff, Christian Tetzlaff, Paavo Järvi & Deutsches Symphonie-Orchester Berlin) (A); 4. Mozart: Sinigaglia (Noah Bendix-Balgley) (A); 5. Rachmaninoff: Symphony No. 2 (Kirill Petrenko & Berliner Philharmoniker) (A); 6. The Vienna Recital (Yuja Wang) (A); Morten Lindberg; 1. Mor (Karen Haugom Olsen & Nidaros Domkor) (A); 2. Pax (Nina T. Karlsen, Ensemble 96 & Current Saxophone Quartet) (A); 3. Sommerro: Borders (Nick Davies & Trondheim Symphony Orchestra); Dmitriy Lipay; 1. Adams: Girls of the Golden West (John Adams, Daniela Mack, Ryan McKinny, Paul Appleby, Hye Jung Lee, Elliot Madore, Julia Bullock, Davóne Tines, Los Angeles Philharmonic & Los Angeles Master Chorale) (A); 2. Messiaen: Des Canyons Aux Étoiles... (Ludovic Morlot & Seattle Symphony) (A); 3. Ortiz: Revolución Diamantina (Gustavo Dudamel, Gabriela Ortiz, María Dueñas, Los Angeles Philharmonic, Los Angeles Master Chorale) (A); Dirk Sobotka; 1. American Dreams (Louis Langrée & Cincinnati Symphony) (A); 2. Bruckner: Symphony No. 7; Bates: Resurrexit (Manfred Honeck & Pittsburgh Symphony Orchestra) (A); 3. Dvořák: Symphony No. 9, 'From The New World'; American Suite (Nathalie Stutzmann & Atlanta Symphony Orchestra) (A); 4. Radiance Untethered - The Choral Music Of John Wykoff (Cameron F. Labarr & Missouri State University Chorale) (A)	**Best Immersive Audio Album**: **I/O (In-Side Mix)**; **Hans-Martin Buff, immersive mix engineer; Peter Gabriel, immersive producer (Peter Gabriel)**; Avalon; Bob Clearmountain, immersive mix engineer; John Webber, immersive mastering engineer; Rhett Davies & Bryan Ferry, immersive producers (Roxy Music); Genius Loves Company; Michael Romanowski, Eric Schilling & Herbert Waltl, immersive mix engineers; Michael Romanowski, immersive mastering engineer; John Burk, immersive producer (Ray Charles With Various Artists); Henning Sommerro: Borders; Morten Lindberg, immersive mix engineer; Morten Lindberg, immersive mastering engineer; Morten Lindberg, immersive producer (Trondheim Symphony Orchestra); Pax; Morten Lindberg, immersive mix engineer; Morten Lindberg, immersive mastering engineer; Morten Lindberg, immersive producer (Ensemble 96 & Current Saxophone Quartet)
**Best Instrumental Composition**: **"Strands"**; **Pascal Le Boeuf, composer (Akropolis Reed Quintet, Pascal Le Boeuf & Christian Euman)**; "At Last"; Shelton G. Berg, composer (Shelly Berg); "Communion"; Christopher Zuar, composer (Christopher Zuar Orchestra); "I Swear, I Really Wanted to Make a 'Rap' Album but This Is Literally the Way the Wind Blew Me This Time"; André 3000, Surya Botofasina, Nate Mercereau & Carlos Niño, composers (André 3000); "Remembrance"; Chick Corea, composer (Chick Corea & Béla Fleck)
**Best Engineered Album, Classical**: **Bruckner: Symphony No. 7; Bates: Resurrexit**; **Mark Donahue & John Newton, engineers; Mark Donahue, mastering engineer (Manfred Honeck & Pittsburgh Symphony Orchestra)**; Adams: Girls Of The Golden West; Alexander Lipay & Dmitriy Lipay, engineers; Alexander Lipay & Dmitriy Lipay, mastering engineers (John Adams, Daniela Mack, Ryan McKinny, Paul Appleby, Hye Jung Lee, Elliot Madore, Julia Bullock, Davóne Tines, Los Angeles Philharmonic & Los Angeles Master Chorale); Andres: The Blind Banister; Silas Brown, Doron Schachter & Michael Schwartz, engineers; Matt Colton, mastering engineer (Andrew Cyr, Inbal Segev & Metropolis Ensemble); Clear Voices In The Dark; Daniel Shores, engineer; Daniel Shores, mastering engineer (Matthew Guard & Skylark Vocal Ensemble); Ortiz: Revolución Diamantina; Alexander Lipay & Dmitriy Lipay, engineers; Alexander Lipay & Dmitriy Lipay, mastering engineers (Gustavo Dudamel, María Dueñas, Los Angeles Philharmonic & Los Angeles Master Chorale)	**Best Engineered Album, Non-Classical**: **I/O**; **Tchad Blake, Oli Jacobs, Katie May, Dom Shaw & Mark "Spike" Stent, engineers; Matt Colton, mastering engineer (Peter Gabriel)**; Algorithm; Dernst Emile II, Michael B. Hunter, Jordan Johnson, Stefan Johnson, Rachel Keen, John Kercy, Charles Moniz & Todd Robinson, engineers; Colin Leonard, mastering engineer (Lucky Daye); Cyan Blue; Jack Emblem, Jack Rochon & Charlotte Day Wilson, engineers; Chris Gehringer, mastering engineer (Charlotte Day Wilson); Deeper Well; Craig Alvin, Shawn Everett, Mai Leisz, Todd Lombardo, John Rooney, Konrad Snyder & Daniel Tashian, engineers; Greg Calbi, mastering engineer (Kacey Musgraves); Empathogen; Beatriz Artola, Zach Brown, Oscar Cornejo, Chris Greatti, Mitch McCarthy, Willow Smith & Adam Schoeller, engineers; Joe LaPorta, mastering engineer (Willow); Short n' Sweet; Jack Antonoff, Bryce Bordone, Julian Bunetta, Serban Ghenea, Jeff Gunnell, Oli Jacobs, Ian Kirkpatrick, Jack Manning, Manny Marroquin, John Ryan & Laura Sisk, engineers; Nathan Dantzler & Ruairi O'Flaherty, mastering engineers (Sabrina Carpenter)
**Best Arrangement, Instrumental or A Cappella**: **"Bridge Over Troubled Water"**; **Jacob Collier, Tori Kelly & John Legend, arrangers (Jacob Collier featuring John Legend & Tori Kelly)**; "Baby Elephant Walk - Encore"; Michael League, arranger (Snarky Puppy); "Rhapsody In Blue (Grass)"; Béla Fleck, arranger (Béla Fleck featuring Michael Cleveland, Sierra Hull, Justin Moses, Mark Schatz & Bryan Sutton); "Rose Without The Thorns"; Erin Bentlage, Alexander Lloyd Blake, Scott Hoying, A.J. Sealy & Amanda Taylor, arrangers (Scott Hoying featuring säje & Tonality); "Silent Night"; Erin Bentlage, Sara Gazarek, Johnaye Kendrick & Amanda Taylor, arrangers (säje)	**Best Arrangement, Instrumental and Vocals**: **"Alma"**; **Erin Bentlage, Sara Gazarek, Johnaye Kendrick & Amanda Taylor, arrangers (säje featuring Regina Carter)**; "Always Come Back"; Matt Jones, John Legend & Sufjan Stevens, arrangers (John Legend); "b i g f e e l i n g s"; Chris Greatti, Zach Tenorio & Willow, arrangers (WILLOW); "Last Surprise (From "Persona 5")"; Charlie Rosen & Jake Silverman, arrangers (The 8-Bit Big Band featuring Jonah Nilsson & Button Masher); "The Sound Of Silence"; Cody Fry, arranger (Cody Fry featuring Sleeping At Last)

=== Classical ===
Classical Field
**Best Orchestral Performance**: **Ortiz: Revolución Diamantina**; **Gustavo Dudamel, conductor (Los Angeles Philharmonic)**; Adams: City Noir, Fearful Symmetries & Lola Montez Does The Spider Dance; Marin Alsop, conductor (ORF Vienna Radio Symphony Orchestra); Kodály: Háry János Suite; Summer Evening & Symphony In C Major; JoAnn Falletta, conductor (Buffalo Philharmonic Orchestra); Sibelius: Karelia Suite, Rakastava, & Lemminkäinen; Susanna Mälkki, conductor (Helsinki Philharmonic Orchestra); Stravinsky: The Firebird; Esa-Pekka Salonen, conductor (San Francisco Symphony)	**Best Opera Recording**: **Saariaho: Adriana Mater**; **Esa-Pekka Salonen, conductor; Fleur Barron, Axelle Fanyo, Nicholas Phan & Christopher Purves; Jason O'Connell, producer (San Francisco Symphony; San Francisco Symphony Chorus; Timo Kurkikangas)**; Adams: Girls Of The Golden West; John Adams, conductor; Paul Appleby, Julia Bullock, Hye Jung Lee, Daniela Mack, Elliot Madore, Ryan McKinny & Davóne Tines; Dmitriy Lipay, producer (Los Angeles Philharmonic; Los Angeles Master Chorale); Catán: Florencia en el Amazonas; Yannick Nézet-Séguin, conductor; Mario Chang, Michael Chioldi, Greer Grimsley, Nancy Fabiola Herrera, Mattia Olivieri, Ailyn Pérez & Gabriella Reyes; David Frost, producer (The Metropolitan Opera Orchestra; The Metropolitan Opera Chorus); Moravec: The Shining; Gerard Schwarz, conductor; Tristan Hallett, Kelly Kaduce & Edward Parks; Blanton Alspaugh, producer (Kansas City Symphony; Lyric Opera Of Kansas City Chorus); Puts: The Hours; Yannick Nézet-Séguin, conductor; Joyce DiDonato, Renée Fleming & Kelli O'Hara; David Frost, producer (Metropolitan Opera Orchestra; Metropolitan Opera Chorus)
**Best Choral Performance**: **Ochre**; **Donald Nally, conductor (The Crossing)**; Clear Voices In The Dark; Matthew Guard, conductor (Carrie Cheron, Nathan Hodgson, Helen Karloski & Clare McNamara; Skylark Vocal Ensemble); A Dream So Bright: Choral Music Of Jake Runestad; Eric Holtan, conductor (Jeffrey Biegel; True Concord Orchestra; True Concord Voices); Handel: Israel in Egypt; Jeannette Sorrell, conductor (Margaret Carpenter Haigh, Daniel Moody, Molly Netter, Jacob Perry & Edward Vogel; Apollo's Fire; Apollo's Singers); Sheehan: Akathist; Elaine Kelly, conductor; Melissa Attebury, Stephen Sands & Benedict Sheehan, chorus masters (Elizabeth Bates, Paul D'Arcy, Tynan Davis, Aine Hakamatsuka, Steven Hrycelak, Helen Karloski, Enrico Lagasca, Edmund Milly, Fotina Naumenko, Neil Netherly, Timothy Parsons, Stephen Sands, Miriam Sheehan & Pamela Terry; Novus NY; Artefact Ensemble, The Choir Of Trinity Wall Street, Downtown Voices & Trinity Youth Chorus)	**Best Chamber Music/Small Ensemble Performance**: **Rectangles and Circumstance – Caroline Shaw & Sō Percussion**; Adams, J.L.: Waves & Particles – JACK Quartet; Beethoven For Three: Symphony No. 4 and Op. 97, 'Archduke' – Yo-Yo Ma, Leonidas Kavakos & Emanuel Ax; Cerrone: Beaufort Scales" – Beth Willer, Christopher Cerrone & Lorelei Ensemble; Home – Miró Quartet
**Best Classical Instrumental Solo**: **Bach: Goldberg Variations – Víkingur Ólafsson**; Akiho: Longing – Andy Akiho; Eastman: The Holy Presence Of Joan D'Arc – Seth Parker Woods (Wild Up); Entourer – Mak Grgić (Ensemble Dissonance); Perry: Concerto For Violin & Orchestra – Curtis Stewart; James Blachly, conductor (Experiential Orchestra)	**Best Classical Vocal Solo**: **Beyond The Years - Unpublished Songs Of Florence Price**; **Karen Slack, soloist; Michelle Cann, pianist**; A Change Is Gonna Come; Nicholas Phan, soloist; Palaver Strings, ensembles; Bespoke Songs; Fotina Naumenko, soloist; Marika Bournaki, pianist (Nadège Foofat; Julietta Curenton, Colin Davin, Mark Edwards, Nadia Pessoa, Timothy Roberts, Ryan Romine, Julian Schwarz, Akemi Takayama, Karlyn Viña & Garrick Zoeter); Show Me The Way; Will Liverman, soloist; Jonathan King, pianist; Wagner: Wesendonck Lieder; Joyce DiDonato, soloist; Maxim Emelyanychev, conductor (Il Pomo d'Oro)
**Best Classical Compendium**: **Ortiz: Revolución Diamantina**; **Gustavo Dudamel, conductor; Dmitriy Lipay, producer**; Akiho: BeLonging; Andy Akiho & Imani Winds; Andy Akiho, Sean Dixon & Mark Dover, producers; American Counterpoints; Curtis Stewart; James Blachly, conductor; Blanton Alspaugh, producer; Foss: Symphony No. 1; Renaissance Concerto; Three American Pieces; Ode; JoAnn Falletta, conductor; Bernd Gottinger, producer; Mythologies II; Sangeeta Kaur, Omar Najmi, Hila Plitmann, Robert Thies & Danaë Xanthe Vlasse; Michael Jeffrey Shapiro, conductor; Jeff Atmajian, Emilio D. Miler, Hai Nguyen, Robert Thies, Danaë Xanthe Vlasse & Kitt Wakeley, producers	**Best Contemporary Classical Composition**: **Ortiz: Revolución Diamantina**; **Gabriela Ortiz, composer (Gustavo Dudamel, Los Angeles Philharmonic & Los Angeles Master Chorale)**; Casarrubios: Seven For Solo Cello; Andrea Casarrubios, composer (Andrea Casarrubios); Coleman: Revelry; Valerie Coleman, composer (Decoda); Lang: Composition As Explanation; David Lang, composer (Eighth Blackbird); Saariaho: Adriana Mater; Kaija Saariaho, composer (Esa-Pekka Salonen, Fleur Barron, Nicholas Phan, Christopher Purves, Axelle Fanyo, San Francisco Symphony Chorus & Orchestra)

== Special merit awards ==
Recipients of the Lifetime Achievement Awards, Trustee Awards, and Technical Grammy Awards were announced on December 20, 2024. The Special Merit Awards ceremony was held at the Wilshire Ebell Theater in Los Angeles on February 1, 2025.

=== Lifetime Achievement Awards ===
- Frankie Beverly
- The Clash
- Dr. Bobby Jones
- Taj Mahal
- Prince
- Roxanne Shante
- Frankie Valli

=== Trustee Awards ===
- Erroll Garner
- Glyn Johns
- Tania León

=== Technical Grammy Awards ===
- Dr. Leo Beranek

=== Music Educator Award ===
- Adrian L. Maclin, Cordova High School, Memphis, Tennessee

=== Salute To Industry Icons Honoree ===
- Jody Gerson

=== Dr. Dre Global Impact Award ===
- Alicia Keys, who in her acceptance speech mentioned, "DEI is not a threat, but a gift," as President Trump rolled back diversity initiatives via executive orders.

=== Harry Belafonte Best Song for Social Change Award ===
- "Deliver," written by Iman Jordan (performer), Roy Gartrell, Tam Jones, and Ariel Loh

=== MusiCares Person(s) of the Year ===
- Grateful Dead

== Multiple nominations and awards ==
The following received multiple awards:

5 wins

- Kendrick Lamar

4 wins

- Sierra Ferrell

3 wins

- Beyoncé
- Charli XCX
- St. Vincent

2 wins

- Jon Batiste
- Sabrina Carpenter
- Gustavo Dudamel
- Samara Joy
- Kabir Sehgal
- Mimy Succar
- CeCe Winans

The following received multiple nominations:

11 nominations

- Beyoncé

8 nominations

- Charli XCX
- Post Malone

7 nominations

- Billie Eilish
- Kendrick Lamar

6 nominations

- Jack Antonoff
- Sabrina Carpenter
- Chappell Roan
- Taylor Swift

5 nominations

- Béla Fleck
- Serban Ghenea
- Dmitriy Lipay
- Los Angeles Philharmonic
- Dan Nigro
- Shaboozey

4 nominations

- Amy Allen
- Sierra Ferrell
- Finneas
- Future
- Muni Long
- Randy Merrill
- Metro Boomin
- Chandler Moore
- Kacey Musgraves
- Raphael Saadiq
- Gabriela Ortiz
- St. Vincent

3 nominations

- André 3000
- Chris Brown
- Jacob Collier
- A.G. Cook
- Doechii
- Eminem
- Sullivan Fortner
- Four Tet
- Ariana Grande
- Green Day
- Idles
- Kaytranada
- Kehlani
- John Legend
- Morten Lindberg
- Manny Marroquin
- Maverick City Music
- Yannick Nézet-Séguin
- Pearl Jam
- Naomi Raine
- Raye
- Säje
- Tems
- CeCe Winans

== In Memoriam ==
The following individuals were included in a montage during the In Memoriam performance at the ceremony with Chris Martin of Coldplay performing a rendition of their song "All My Love" alongside guitarist Grace Bowers. An expanded list of those who died during the previous year was included on the Grammy website.

- Liam Payne
- Kris Kristofferson
- Ángela Álvarez
- Steve Albini
- Cissy Houston
- John Mayall
- Dickey Betts
- Angela Bofill
- Joe Bonsall
- Fatman Scoop
- Sandra Crouch
- Richard M. Sherman
- Joe Chambers
- Jack Jones
- Duane Eddy
- Henry "Hank" Cicalo
- Abdul Kareem "Duke" Fakir
- Will Jennings
- Kinky Friedman
- Egidio Cuadrado
- David Sanborn
- Steve Lawrence
- DJ Clark Kent
- Mary Martin
- Sam Moore
- Tito Jackson
- Marianne Faithfull
- Ben Vaughn
- Sérgio Mendes
- Frankie Beverly
- Eric Carmen
- Rich Homie Quan
- Phil Lesh
- Bob Newhart
- Seiji Ozawa
- Ella Jenkins
- Wayne Osmond
- Alfa Anderson
- Richard Perry
- Lani Simmons
- JD Souther
- Roy Haynes
- John Titta
- Rico Wade
- Garth Hudson
- Toby Keith
