= Orrego =

Orrego is a Spanish surname. Notable people with the surname include:

- Alberto Orrego Luco (1854–1931), Chilean landscape painter and diplomat
- Ángel Cereceda Orrego (born 1966), Chilean musician and producer
- Antenor Orrego (1892–1960), Peruvian writer and political philosopher
- Ariana Orrego (born 1998), Peruvian artistic gymnast
- Carlos Altamirano Orrego (1922–2019), Chilean lawyer and socialist politician
- Claudio Orrego (born 1966), Chilean lawyer and politician
- Diana Maria Garcia Orrego (born 1982), Colombian track cyclist
- Eduardo Orrego Villacorta (1933–1994), Peruvian architect and politician
- Juan Orrego-Salas (1919–2019), Chilean composer, musicologist, music critic, and academic
- Juan Pablo Orrego (born 1949), Chilean ecologist, musician and environmentalist
- Luis Orrego Luco (1866–1948), Chilean politician, lawyer, novelist and diplomat
- Luis Uribe Orrego (1847–1914), Vice-Admiral of the Chilean Navy
- Luz Eliana Ebensperger Orrego (born 1964), Chilean lawyer and politician
- Manuel Orrego-Savala (born 1980 or 1981), Guatemalan immigrant, killer of Edwin Jackson
- Marcelo Orrego (born 1975), Argentine lawyer and politician
- Martina Barros de Orrego (1850–1944), Chilean writer and feminist
- Rodrigo Orrego, Chilean opera singer
- Rosario Orrego (1834–1879), Chilean novelist, poet, editor, and educator

== See also ==
- Antenor Orrego Private University, a Peruvian private university
- C.D. Universidad Privada Antenor Orrego, a Peruvian football club
