= Die Verschworenen =

One-act singspiel

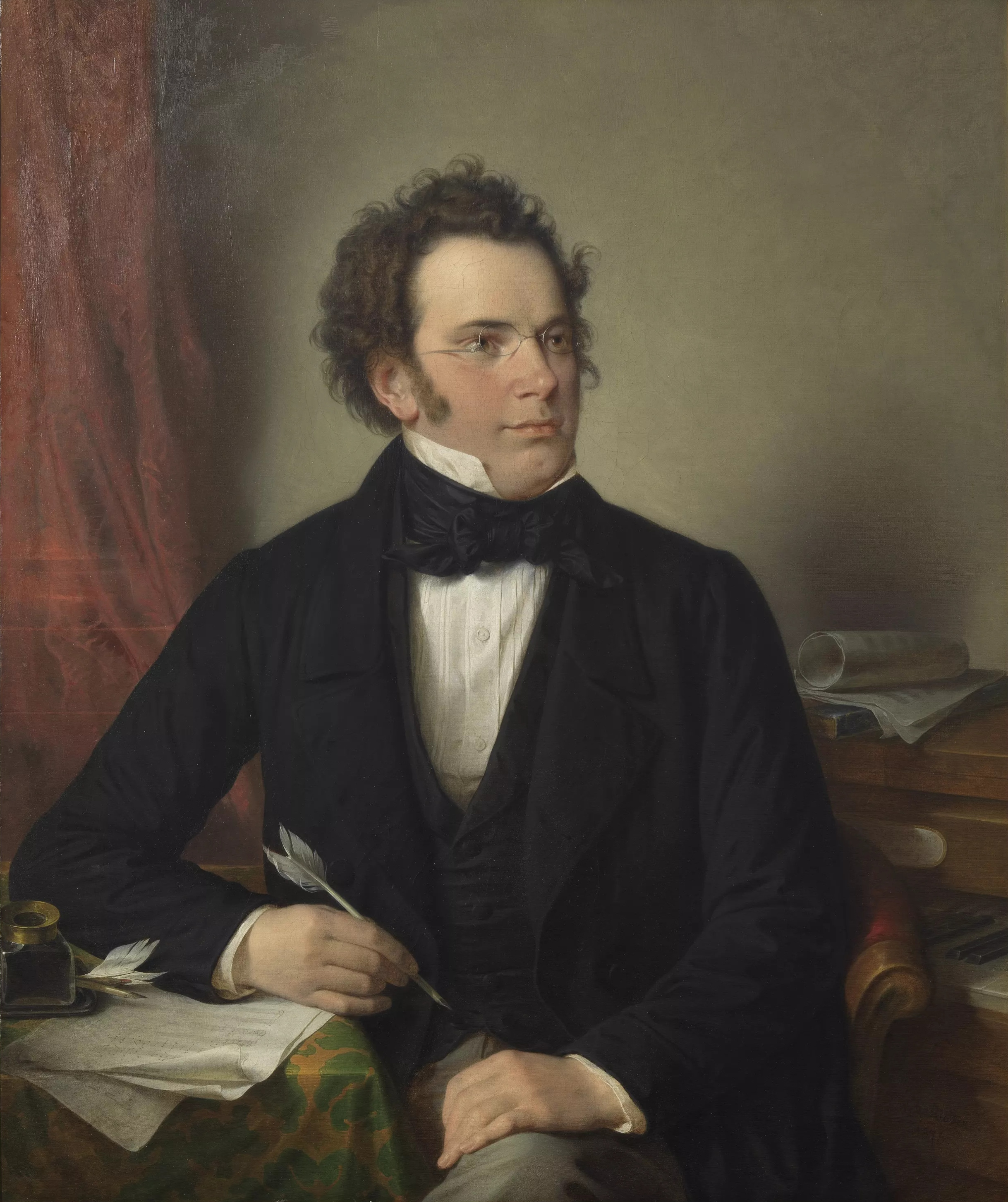
Franz Schubert

Die Verschworenen, also known as Der häusliche Krieg (D 787) is an 1823 one-act singspiel by Franz Schubert after a libretto by Ignaz Franz Castelli with spoken dialogue by the composer. Castelli's libretto was based on Lisistrata, ou Les Athéniennes, Comédie en un acte et en prose, mêlée de vaudevilles by François-Benoît Hoffman, which had premiered at the Théâtre Feydeau in Paris in 1802. The French play in turn was based on Lysistrata by Aristophanes (411 BCE).

== Composition ==
The work is for four or five sopranos, two contraltos, two or three tenors, two basses, mixed choir and orchestra:

Ouverture (fragment)

1. Duet: "Sie ist's! Er ist's!" (2 versions; 1st version for soprano, tenor and orchestra; 2nd version for two sopranos and orchestra)
2. Romanze: "Ich schleiche bang' und still herum"
3. Ensemble: "Ihr habt auf Eure Burg entboten"
4. Corus ("Verschwörungschor" [conspiracy chorus]): "Ja, wir schwören"
5. March and chorus: "Vorüber ist die Zeit"
6. Ensemble: "Verrätherei hab' ich entdeckt"
7. Chorus of knights and women: "Willkommen, schön willkommen"
8. Duet: "Ich muß sie finden"
9. Arietta: "Ich habe gewagt und habe gestritten"
10. Arietta: "Gesetzt, ihr habt wirklich gewagt"
11. Finale: "Wie? Darf ich meinen Augen traun?"; Ensemble: "Ich bin beschämt"

== Recordings ==
- Soile Isokoski, Lisa Larsson, Anke Hoffmann, Mechthild Georg, Rodrigo Orrego, Peter Lika, Chorus Musicus, Das Neue Orchester, Christoph Spering, Opus 111 1996
- The College Opera House Orchestra (Osaka College of Music), Norichika Iimori, Exton Records
- Edda Moser, Kurt Moll, Martin Finke, Adolf Dallapozza, Bavarian Radio Chorus, Munich Radio Orchestra, Heinz Wallberg CPO
- Camille Zamora, Nathan Stark, Nicholas Phan, Deanna Breiwick, Matthew Tuell, American Symphony Orchestra, Leon Botstein, 2014
