= Lucrecia Undurraga Solar =

Chilean journalist and writer (1841–1901)

Lucrecia Undurraga Solar (Illapel, 1841 – Santiago, 1901) was a Chilean writer, editor and journalist who published work about the inferior condition of women in her country. She was a key figure in the development of journalism by women and was a vocal advocate for the education of women and girls, especially in the sciences. In historical terms, she is considered the second Chilean woman to succeed as a novelist behind only Rosario Orrego.

== Biography ==
Undurraga was born in Illapel, about 300 kilometres (190 miles) north of Santiago, Chile, into a wealthy family that gave her an excellent early education, which was unusual for girls in the 19th century. Her parents were José Agustín Undurraga Gajardo and Josefa Solar Gorotizaga. She spent her adolescence in Illapel, and she married businessman José Manuel Somarriva Berganza, with whom she had one son, Marcelo Somarriva Undurraga, born in 1864. When her husband died, she was left in a comfortable economic position even though she was not a member of the aristocracy. She used the money from her husband's ranch to relocate to Valparaiso and Santiago and financed several cultural and intellectual activities promoting women's causes

She was an editor of the newspaper La Brisa de Chile. She was also the founder of La Mujer (The Woman) in 1877, which was one of the first Chilean newspapers produced by and for women. As the newspaper's editor, she was able to highlight subjects of women's rights, female education and equality for girls with a special emphasis on science education. In these pages she published her novel El ramo de violetas (The Bouquet of Violets) about female emancipation.

She published two novels that appeared as chapters in the newspapers La Brisa de Chile (1875–1876) and La Mujer during the 1870s. In her novels (published in weekly installments), Undurraga argued that women's education is a necessity for the nation's progress, while at the same time passing along literary, historical and political knowledge to her readers.

In the pages of Sud-América, she published an account of her experience as a visitor at the Academy of Fine Arts, Santiago, in July 1873. At that time, Rosario Orrego had been admitted as the only woman member, but one day, when Undurraga was a guest, she was allowed to give a talk to the membership during which time "she sparked a controversy by speaking about the scientific education of women."

Undurraga died at 60 in 1901 in Santiago, Chile.

== Legacy ==
According to Sepúlveda: "Her writing career includes essays, speeches, plays, short stories, and articles published in contemporary cultural magazines; all notable for their liberal views and defense of women's rights."

== Selected works ==
- The Hermits of Huaquén. Popular traditions of Northern Chile (1875), published in the newspaper La Brisa de Chile
- The Bouquet of Violets (1877), published in La Mujer
