= Luis Uribe =

Luis Uribe may refer to:

- Luis Uribe Barra (1897–1980), Chilean physician and politician
- Luis Uribe (diver) (born 2001), Colombian competitive diver
- Luis Uribe Orrego (1847–1914), vice-admiral of the Chilean Navy
