= Nicholas Phan =

American lyric tenor

Nicholas Phan (last name pronounced /ˈPan/; b. Hartford, Connecticut, January 3, 1979) is an American lyric tenor who has performed internationally with orchestras including the New York Philharmonic, Philadelphia Orchestra, the Los Angeles Philharmonic, the Philharmonia Orchestra, the San Francisco Symphony, and the Chicago Symphony Orchestra. Born to a Chinese Indonesian father (from Jakarta) and Greek American mother (from Indianapolis), Phan grew up in Ann Arbor, Michigan, where he attended Greenhills School. He studied voice at the University of Michigan School of Music, Theatre & Dance and the Manhattan School of Music. Phan is an alumnus of the Houston Grand Opera Studio and the Marlboro Music School. He has been called "one of the world's most remarkable singers" by the Boston Globe.

Phan's many opera credits include appearances with the Los Angeles Opera, Houston Grand Opera, Glimmerglass Festival, Chicago Opera Theater, Seattle Opera, Portland Opera, Naumburg Orchestral Concerts, Glyndebourne Opera, Maggio Musicale in Florence, Deutsche Oper am Rhein, and Frankfurt Opera. His repertoire includes the title roles in Acis and Galatea and Candide, Almaviva in Il barbiere di Siviglia, Nemorino in L'elisir d'amore, Fenton in Falstaff, Tamino in Die Zauberflöte, Don Ottavio in Don Giovanni, and Lurcanio in Ariodante.

Phan's discography includes five studio albums, including two focusing on the works of Benjamin Britten, for which he was called "a major new Britten interpreter" by Anthony Tommasini of The New York Times. He also recorded the world premier of Elliott Carter's A Sunbeam's Architecture to commemorate Carter's 103rd birthday. and has been featured in recordings of many orchestral and ensemble works. He has been nominated twice for a Grammy Award: first for his 2010 recording of Stravinsky's Pulcinella with Pierre Boulez and the Chicago Symphony Orchestra, and most recently in 2017 for Gods and Monsters, his recording of selected German Lieder with Myra Huang. In 2013, he was a soloist with the Naumburg Orchestral Concerts, in the Naumburg Bandshell, Central Park, in the summer series.

Phan is the founding artistic director of the Collaborative Arts Institute of Chicago. and on the faculty of the DePaul University School of Music.

== Recordings ==
- Joel Puckett: Short Stories in London, with London Symphony Orchestra and Joseph Young, Avie Records (2025)
- Clairières: Songs by Lili & Nadia Boulanger, with Myra Huang, Avie Records (2020)
- Illuminations: Britten, Debussy, Fauré, with Myra Huang, Telegraph Quartet, the Knights Chamber Orchestra. Avie Records (2018)
- Bach: St. John Passion, as Evangelist with Apollo's Fire, Jeannette Sorrell, Amanda Forsythe, Terry Wey, Christian Immler, Jesse Blumberg and Jeffrey Strauss. Avie Records (2017)
- Gods & Monsters, with Myra Huang. Avie Records (2017)
- A. Scarlatti: La Gloria di Primavera. with Philharmonia Baroque Orchestra, Nicholas McGegan, Diana Moore, Suzana Ograjensek, Clint van der Linde, Douglas Williams, Philharmonia Chorale. (2016)
- A Painted Tale, with Michael Leopold, Ann-Marie Morgan. Avie Records (2015)
- Schubert: Die Verschworenen, with Leon Botstein, Camilla Zamorra, Nathan Stark, Deanna Breiwick, Matthew Tuell, American Symphony Orchestra. (2014)
- St Matthew Passion (DVD). with the Orchestre de chambre de Paris, Schola Cantorum of Oxford, Maîtrise de Paris, John Nelson, Lucy Crowe, Matthew Brook, Bertrand Grunewald, Werner Güra, Stephen Morscheck & Christine Rice. EuroArts (2013)
- Still Falls the Rain, with Myra Huang, Alan Cumming, Jennifer Montone, Sivan Magen. Avie Records (2012)
- Carter: 103rd Birthday Concert with Ryan McAdams, Marie Tachouet, Stephen Taylor, Charles Neidich, Virgil Blackwell, Peter Kolkay, Jim Pugh, Stephen Gosling, Mike Truesdell, Gordon Gottlieb, Aaron Boyd, Miranda Cuckson & Tai Murray. NMC Digital (2011)
- Britten: Winter Words, Seven Sonnets of Michelangelo, with Myra Huang. Avie Records (2011)
- Stravinsky: Pulcinella. with Chicago Symphony Orchestra, Pierre Boulez, Roxana Constantinescu, Kyle Ketelsen. CSO Resound (2010)
