= Jacinto Chacón =

Chilean politician

Jacinto Chacón Barrios
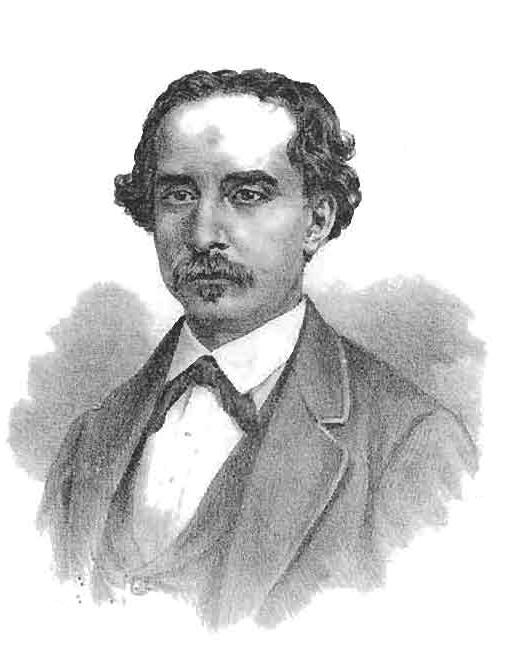

Deputy of the Republic of Chile for Santiago
- In office 18 September 1885-2 June 1888
- Preceded by: Dositeo Errázuriz Zañartu

Personal details
- Born: 16 August 1820 Santiago, Chile
- Died: 1893 (aged 72–73) Santiago, Chile
- Party: Liberal Party
- Spouse: Rosario Orrego

Jacinto Chacón Barrios (16 August 1820 – 1893) was a Chilean politician of the Liberal Party. He served as the deputy for San Felipe, Santiago from 1885 to 1888.
