= Daniel Moody (countertenor) =

American opera singer

- Education: Peabody Conservatory; Yale Institute of Sacred Music
- Occupation: Operatic countertenor
- Awards: Handel Aria Competition; Oratorio Society of New York; George London Foundation
- Website: www.danielmoodycountertenor.com

Daniel Moody is an American countertenor who has performed leading roles at opera houses and festivals in North America, performing both Baroque and contemporary opera. He has performed at the Metropolitan Opera in Brett Dean’s Hamlet as Rosencrantz, at Atlanta Opera as Tolomeo in Giulio Cesare, and at Cincinnati Opera as Nerone in Monteverdi’s L’incoronazione di Poppea.

== Career ==
Moody began his professional studies at the Peabody Conservatory, continuing his studies with James Taylor at the Yale Institute of Sacred Music.

Moody starred in a leading role in the world premiere of Han Lash’s chamber opera Desire, presented at Columbia University’s Miller Theater in collaboration with the JACK Quartet. Moody also worked with Nico Muhly on his song cycles at Saint Thomas Church in New York City. In 2016, Moody gave the American premiere of George Benjamin’s Dream of the Song at the Festival of Contemporary Music at Tanglewood Festival.

In 2018-2019, Moody made his solo debut at Carnegie Hall Stern Auditorium performing Messiah with the Oratorio Society of New York. Later that week, he performed on the same stage as a soloist with Musica Sacra. 2019 also saw him performing with San Francisco’s Philharmonia Baroque Orchestra, singing arias by Handel and Estonian composer Arvo Pärt, as well as duets by G. F. Handel and Henry Purcell alongside Grammy-winning mezzo-soprano Anne Sofie von Otter.

In 2023 he made his Vancouver Opera debut as Oberon in Benjamin Britten’s opera A Midsummer Night's Dream.

== Personal life ==
Daniel is married to concert pianist David Fung.
