= Antonello Manacorda =

Italian violinist and conductor

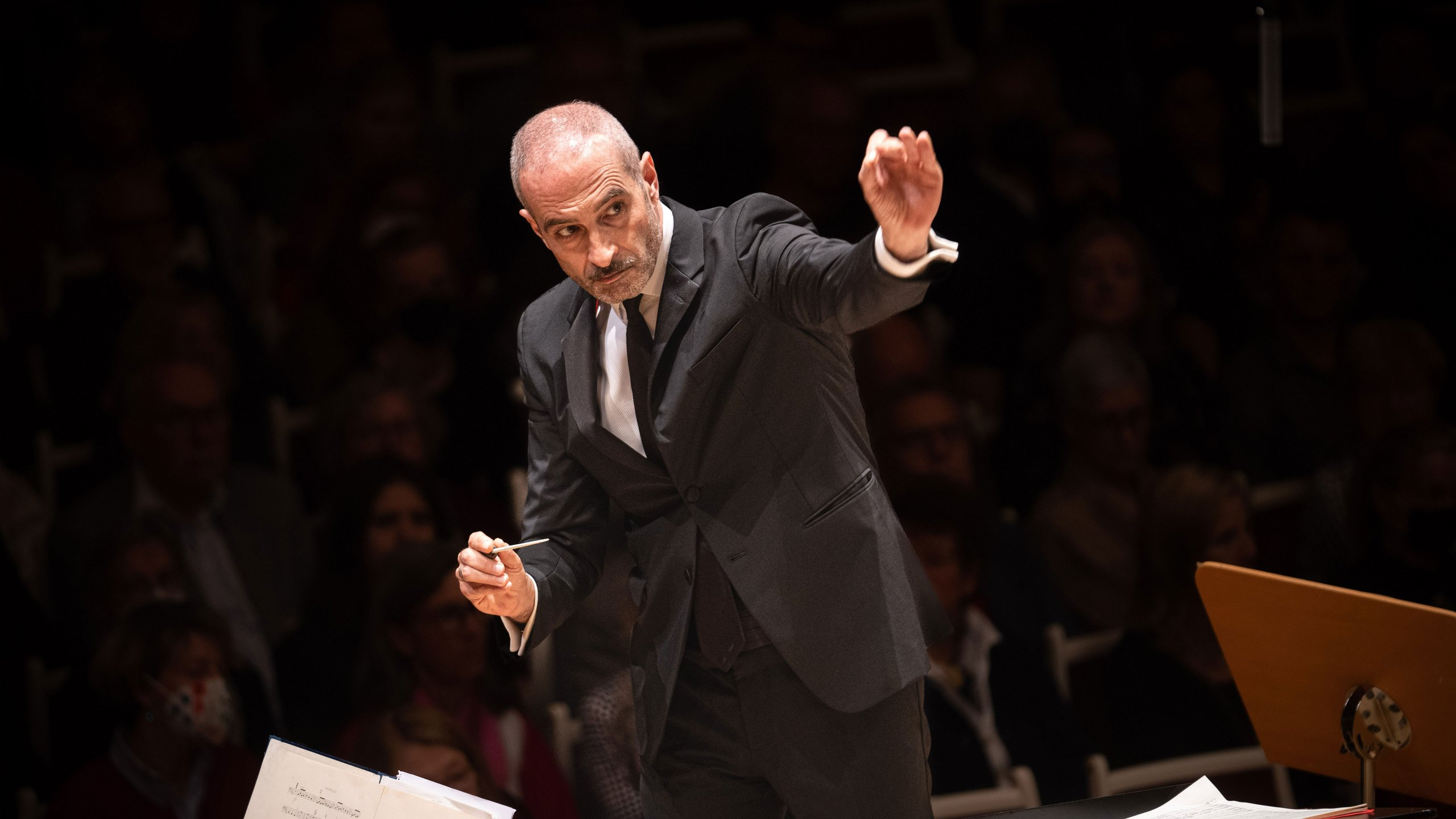
- Born: 1970 (age 55–56); Turin, Italy
- Occupations: Violinist; Conductor
- Organizations: Gustav Mahler Jugendorchester; Mahler Chamber Orchestra; Kammerakademie Potsdam; Het Gelders Orkest
- Awards: Echo Klassik
- Website: www.antonello-manacorda.com

Antonello Manacorda (born 1970) is an Italian violinist and conductor who has worked internationally. He has been the chief conductor of the Kammerakademie Potsdam and of Het Gelders Orkest. In 2026, he was appointed the next Artistic and Music Director of the French period-instrument orchestra Les Siècles, beginning with the 2027–2028 season.

== Career ==
Born in Turin, Manacorda studied violin at the conservatory of his hometown with Sergio Lamberto, graduating with distinction. He continued his studies with Herman Krebbers in Amsterdam, with Eduard Schmieder and with Franco Gulli. In 1994, Claudio Abbado appointed him concertmaster of the Gustav Mahler Jugendorchester. Manacorda founded in 1997, with colleagues and Abbado, the Mahler Chamber Orchestra (MCO), for which he has served as concertmaster and as vice president.

=== Kammerakademie Potsdam ===
Manacorda was appointed Artistic Director and Chief Conductor of the Kammerakademie Potsdam in 2010. During his tenure, the chamber orchestra expanded its international profile, with a particular focus on the Classical and early Romantic repertoire. Manacorda has stated in interviews that, for this repertoire, the orchestra combines historical brass instruments with modern strings and winds, reflecting elements of historically informed performance practice.

With the Kammerakademie Potsdam, Manacorda pursued long-term programming projects, including complete cycles of the symphonies of Mendelssohn, Schubert, Beethoven, and the late symphonies of Mozart. Manacorda has stated that performing these cycles over a short period of time created a special immersive experience for audience and orchestra members alike. Recordings from these projects received major German music awards, including an ECHO Klassik distinction in the category Best Ensemble/Orchestra. In a Cambridge University scholarly survey of Mendelssohn symphony recordings, Benedict Taylor singled out Manacorda’s “impressive” account of the Mendelssohn set for its “imposing symphonic quality.” The orchestra’s complete Beethoven symphony cycle was selected as a Gramophone Editor’s Choice in July 2024.

=== Guest conducting ===
As a guest conductor, Manacorda has appeared with major orchestras across Europe and North America. In recent seasons, he has conducted the Berlin Philharmonic, the Cleveland Orchestra, and the Helsinki Philharmonic Orchestra, among others.

Manacorda’s guest engagements have encompassed a broad repertoire ranging from Mozart, Beethoven, and Schubert to later works by Mahler, Sibelius, Stravinsky, and Schoenberg.

Reviewing his debut with the Cleveland Orchestra at Blossom Music Center, Seen and Heard International noted the vitality and cohesion of the ensemble under Manacorda’s direction.

Writing about a performance with the Berlin Philharmonic, critic Ates Orga described Manacorda’s reading of Schubert’s Unfinished Symphony as “a deeply thoughtful re-assessment.”

In autumn 2025, Manacorda first conducted the French period-instrument orchestra Les Siècles as a guest conductor, in concerts in Amsterdam, Bruges, Tourcoing, and Paris. In June 2026, the orchestra announced his appointment as its next Artistic and Music Director, with his first season in the position scheduled for 2027–2028.

=== Opera career ===
Alongside his orchestral work, Manacorda maintains an active opera career. He has conducted productions at major opera houses, including the Vienna State Opera, the Opéra National de Paris, the Royal Opera House, Covent Garden, the Metropolitan Opera, La Fenice, and the Glyndebourne Festival.

Mozart operas such as Le nozze di Figaro and Don Giovanni have been recurrent in his repertoire. He has also specialized in French opera, conducting operas by Meyerbeer, Berlioz, Bizet, Offenbach, and Debussy.

Reviewing a March 2025 production of Debussy’s Pelléas et Mélisande at the Opéra de Paris, Le Monde stated that, “the musicians of the orchestra, respond[ed] flawlessly to the sensual and fluid direction of Antonello Manacorda, who imbues Debussy’s writing with sumptuous coloration while also infusing it with raw energy, mystery, and depth.”

In August 2025, Manacorda made his debut at the Salzburg Festival, conducting Donizetti’s Maria Stuarda.

Reviewing a January 2026 production of Verdi’s La traviata at the Royal Opera House, Covent Garden, Bachtrack noted Manacorda’s conducting, remarking about the notable “fleeting tenuti and scrupulous dynamics” of his technique. Manacorda is scheduled to conduct La traviata again at the Metropolitan Opera in March and April 2026.

=== Early career ===
Antonello Manacorda was born in Turin and trained initially as a violinist. He studied at the Conservatorio Statale di Musica in Turin and later at the Conservatorium van Amsterdam. A formative influence on his early professional development was his association with Claudio Abbado, who appointed him concertmaster of the Gustav Mahler Jugendorchester in 1994.

Manacorda was a founding member of the Mahler Chamber Orchestra, where he served for many years as concertmaster and vice president. His work with the ensemble, which emerged from Abbado’s youth orchestras, contributed to his experience in chamber-music-based orchestral practice and collaborative rehearsal culture.

He began formal conducting studies in 1998 at the Sibelius Academy in Helsinki with Jorma Panula. In the early phase of his conducting career, Manacorda worked with several European orchestras and opera houses, including engagements in Italy, Germany, and the Netherlands, before assuming more prominent leadership roles in the following decade.
