= Grace Bowers =

American Rock guitarist and songwriter

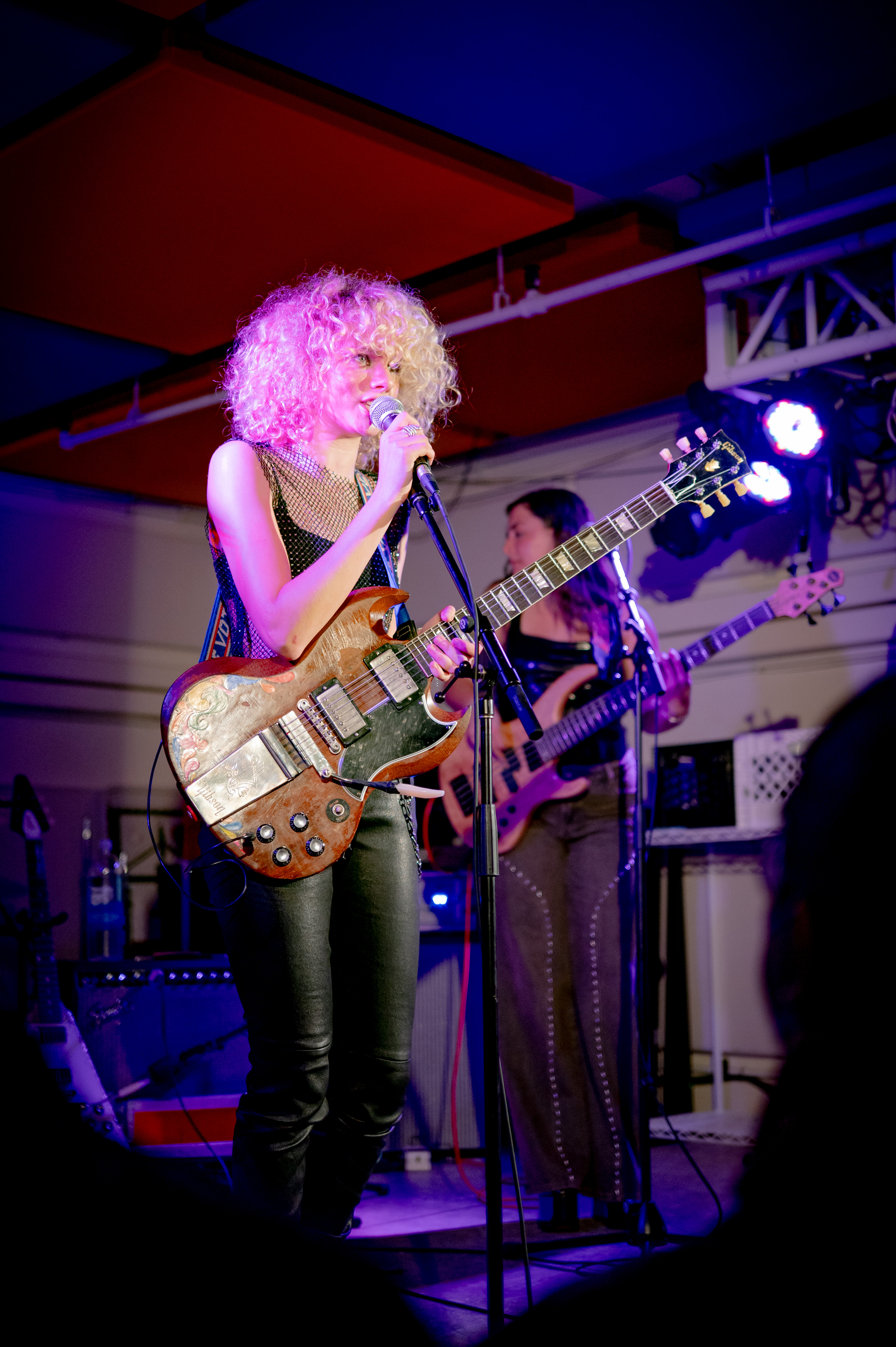
- Bowers in 2026

Background information
- Born: 2005 or 2006 (age 20–21)
- Genre: Rock
- Occupations: Musician; songwriter; Singer
- Instrument: Guitar
- Website: www.gracebowers.com

Grace Bowers is an American blues rock guitarist, songwriter, and bandleader from Nashville, Tennessee. She leads her own band, The Hodge Podge, a group that blends blues-rock with heavy elements of funk and soul.

Her 2024 debut album Wine on Venus, credited to Grace Bowers & the Hodge Podge, includes the song "Madam President", which many media outlets read as commentary on the 2024 United States presidential election.

Originally from the Bay Area, Bowers started playing guitar when she was nine. She gained a following during the COVID-19 pandemic by live-streaming guitar jams on Reddit and Instagram.
