= American Patchwork Quartet =

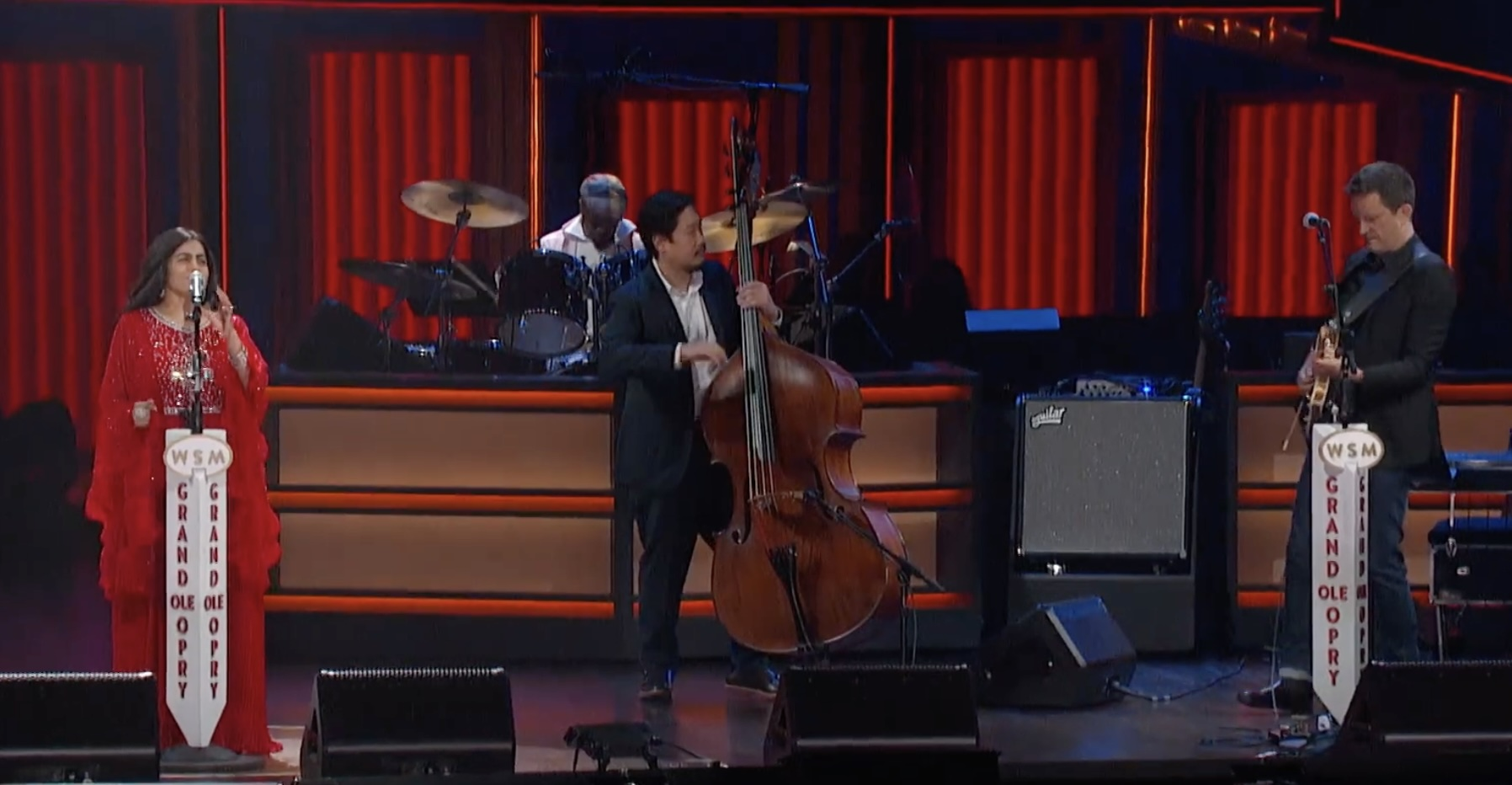
- American Patchwork Quartet at the Grand Ole Opry in 2024.

Background information
- Genres: Americana; roots music; Hindustani classical music; jazz
- Years active: 2024 - present
- Members: Clay Ross; Falu Shah; Clarence Penn; Yasushi Nakamura
- Website: http://americanpatchworkquartet.com.

American Patchwork Quartet (APQ) is an American musical group that reinterprets traditional folk songs with multicultural influences. Founded by guitarist and arranger Clay Ross, the group blends elements of jazz, Hindustani classical music, and Americana to explore themes of immigration, identity, and unity.

== Musical style ==
American Patchwork Quartet's core repertoire consists of classics like The Wayfaring Stranger and Oh Shenandoah, given a unique twist by the inclusion of musical elements not typically associated with American folk music. Their debut album American Patchwork Quartet, released in 2024, features 14 tracks influenced by Appalachian folk, gospel, and Indian classical music.

== Reception ==
The group first performed at the Grand Ole Opry on June 18, 2024. Montana Public Radio called their music a "modern immigrant dream." No Depression praised their ability to connect diverse traditions. Their first album was nominated for Best Folk Album at the 67th Grammy Awards.

== Discography ==
- American Patchwork Quartet (2024)

== Members ==
- Clay Ross – guitar and vocals
- Falu Shah – vocals
- Yasushi Nakamura – bass
- Clarence Penn – drums

In addition to the four core members above, alternate touring musicians in the American Patchwork Quartet include:

- Harini Raghavan – vocals and violin
- Nori Naraoka – bass
- Moto Fukushima – bass
- Yoshiki Yamada – bass
- Rudy Royston – drums
- Ocie Davis – drums
