= Luis Uribe Orrego =

Vice-admiral of the Chilean Navy (1847–1914)

Luis Uribe
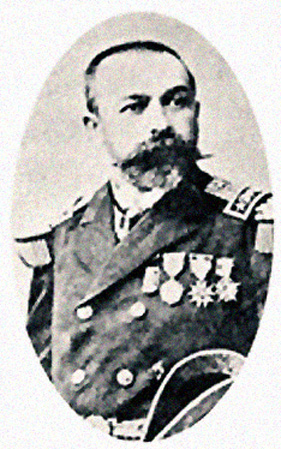
- Born: August 13, 1847 Copiapó, Chile
- Died: July 17, 1914 (aged 66) Valparaíso, Chile

Luis Uribe Orrego (Note: In this Chilean name, the first or paternal surname is Uribe and the second or maternal family name is Orrego.) (August 13, 1847 – July 17, 1914) was a vice-admiral of the Chilean Navy and a hero of the War of the Pacific.

Luis Uribe was born in Copiapó, the son of Juan José Uribe and of Rosario Orrego. He joined the navy on August 20, 1858, at the age of 9, and graduated from the naval academy on July 16, 1861, as a midshipman. His first post was on the "Esmeralda", where he travelled to the extreme south of Chile, to the Juan Fernández Islands and to Peru. Uribe was promoted to ensign (equivalent of army's Second Lieutenant) in 1869, and the next year participated on a scientific expedition to Easter Island, where they prepared a topographic study.

In 1872, he was sent as part of a naval mission to England, under command of Admiral José Anacleto Goñi, who was in charge of contracting the construction of 3 new ships. While there he met a Mrs. Newlove, a widow, of whom he fell in love. Admiral Goñi denied him permission to marry her, but he ignored the command and still went ahead with the wedding in 1874. As a result, he was relieved of his duties and court-martialled. He was finally clear of all charges after being defended by his classmate and lawyer Arturo Prat. In 1875, he was in charge of a hydrographic expedition to the coasts of Aconcagua, work for which he received a prize at the International Exposition of Santiago of 1875. He also wrote a Treatise on Hydrography that became the study text for the naval academy.

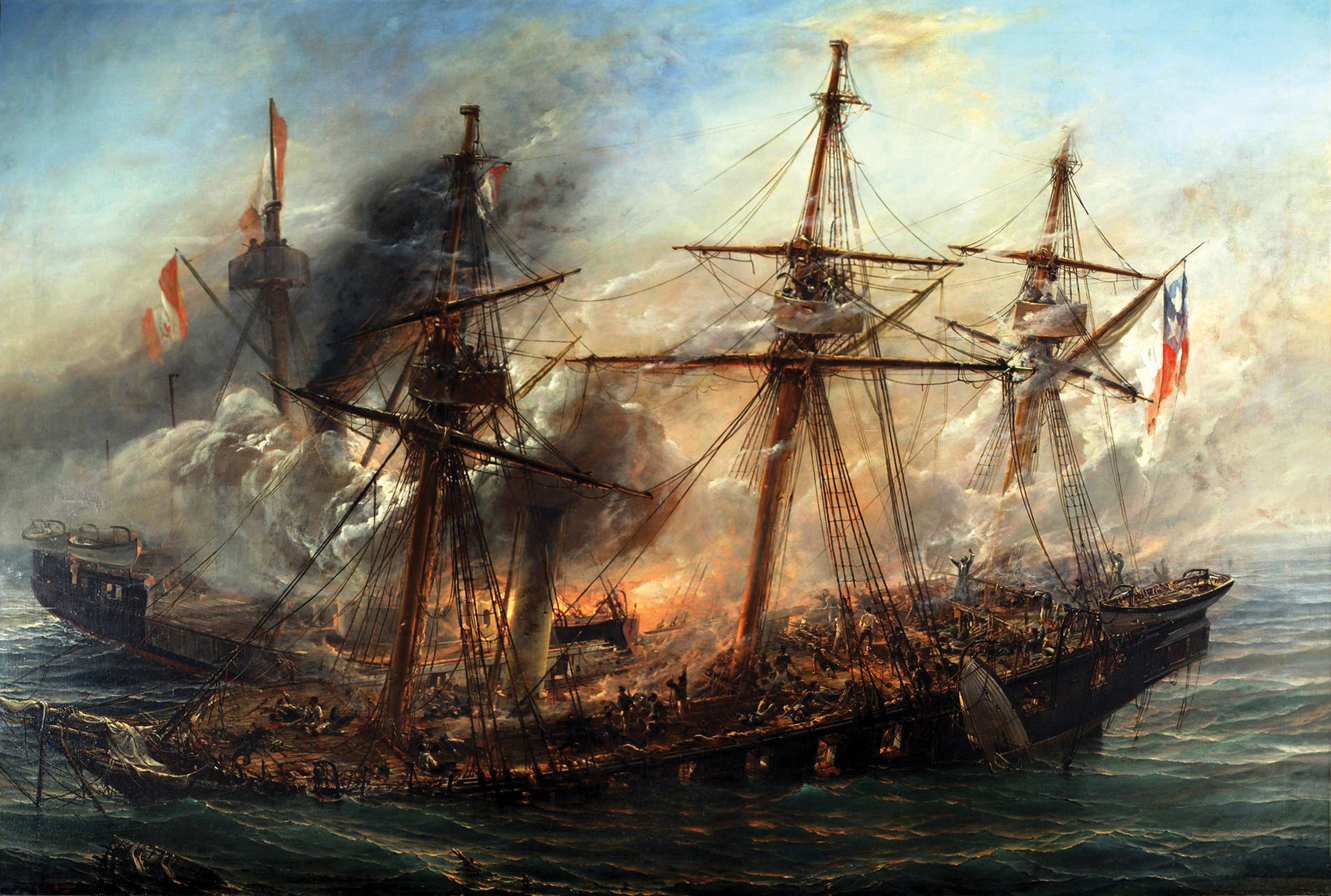
Naval Battle of Iquique

At the beginning of the War of the Pacific, Uribe was the second commander of the Esmeralda, and their first mission was to blockade the Peruvian port of Iquique. On May 21, 1879, their ship faced the Huascar during the Naval Battle of Iquique. His commander and friend Arturo Prat, together with most of the crew died that day, but Uribe continued fighting until the "Esmeralda" went under. He was captured while floating on the bay after the sinking together with only 62 survivors out of a complement of 197.

As a prisoner, he was interned in the city of Tarma, Peru. While a prisoner, Chile promoted him (for supreme heroism) to Lieutenant Commander on June 16, 1879. He and his sailors remained prisoners until November of that year, when they were exchanged for captured Peruvian sailors. Uribe returned to Valparaíso, where he was given the command of the recently captured gunboat "Pilcomayo". During the rest of the war he participated actively in all naval actions and was promoted to Commander in 1884.

After the end of the war, he became Governor of Valparaíso. He promoted the creation of the Revista de Marina (Naval Magazine), and was named Navy General Commander from 1887 to 1889. After the 1891 Chilean Civil War, he was named director of the Naval Academy in 1892, position he retained until 1895. He retired from the navy on August 23, 1899.

He continued writing in the Revista de Valparaíso. In 1905, President German Riesco named him Minister of War and Navy and later Valparaíso Intendant. Uribe wrote many books on naval topics, such as Code of Naval Signals, Naval Tactics, Hydrography, Project of a Naval Penal Code, History of the Chilean Merchant Marine from 1810 to 1904 and most specially Our Military Navy, a history of the Chilean Navy from its creation until 1891 and widely considered the finest history on the topic. He died in Valparaíso at the age of 67 and was intombed in the pantheon to the Heroes of Iquique.

== Notes ==
Political offices
Preceded by Ramón Corvalán	Minister of War and Navy; 1905	Succeeded by Manuel Foster
Military offices
Preceded by Juan José Latorre	Navy General Commander; 1887-1889	Succeeded by Juan Williams Rebolledo
