= Rosario Orrego =

Chilean author and women's rights activist

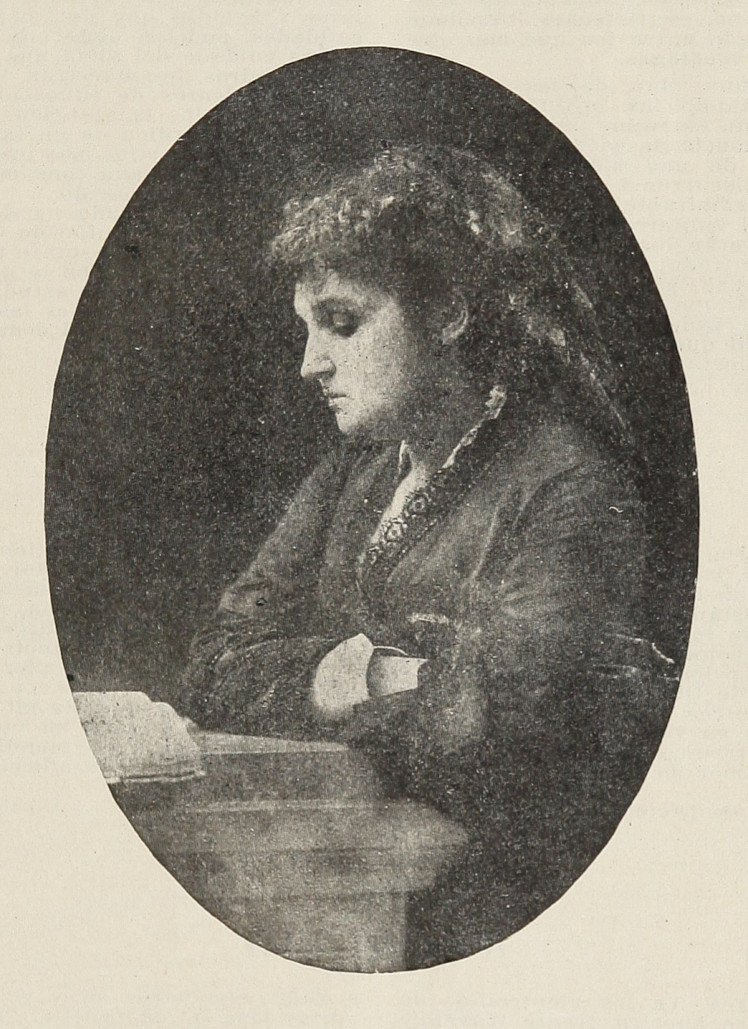
- Orrego in 1910
- Born: Rosario Orrego Castañeda; 1834; Copiapó, Chile
- Died: 21 May 1879 (aged 44–45); Valparaíso, Chile
- Other names: Rosario Orrego de Uribe; Rosario Orrego de Chacón
- Occupations: Writer, journalist, editor, educator
- Movement: Feminism
- Spouse(s): Juan José Uribe Moya (m. 1848, died) Jacinto Chacón Barrios (m. 1874)
- Children: 5 including, Luis Uribe
- Writing career
- Pen name: Una Madre

Rosario Orrego Castañeda (married name de Uribe, later de Chacón; 1834 – 21 May 1879), known by the pseudonym Una Madre, was a Chilean novelist, poet, editor, and educator. Considered the first Chilean female novelist, Orrego was a pioneer of poetry in Chile and a forerunner of women's literature in Hispanic America.

Orrego began her literary career as an editor at La Semana and founded the magazine Valparaíso in 1873. Orrego was the first woman to join the Academia de Bellas Letras literary academy.

== Biography ==
The daughter of Manuel Andrés Orrego and Rosario Castañeda, Rosario Orrego Muñoz was born in the city of Copiapó in 1834. For most of her life she resided in Valparaíso, where she moved in 1853 after the illness of her first husband, the wealthy Chañarcillo miner Juan José Uribe.

== Literary output ==
Rosario Orrego had a distinguished place in the field of Chilean writing during the second half of the 19th century, activity which developed almost entirely in Valparaíso. In addition, she participated in several literary and philanthropic organizations promoting women's rights. In this regard, during this time "she made clear her ardent intention and campaigned to expand the instruction and education of women, as well as a strong spirit of solidarity towards the most destitute of society."

She wrote in a series of magazines and newspapers throughout her life, among them La Revista del Público, Sud-América, Chilena, La Semana, and the Revista del Pacífico – which she founded with her second husband, Jacinto Chacón. In 1873 she founded and edited the magazine Valparaíso.

In 1872, José Victorino Lastarria named her an honorary member of the Academy of Fine Arts in Santiago, making her the first woman in the history of Chile to join an organization of this stature.

=== Novels ===
Orrego's debut novel was Alberto el jugador, a text "of romantic court and custom where the atmosphere of the bourgeoisie is observed and the morals and social codes of the time are confronted." She published this in installments in the early 1860s in the Revista del Pacífico.

Her second novel – probably unfinished – titled Los busca vidas: novela de costumbres appeared in 1862. In it she showed a greater social concern and looked at the situation of women in social conflicts of the era, revealing "a deep knowledge of a boom time in Northern life when people came from everywhere to look for work and wealth, thus creating the rise of a mining bourgeoisie."

In 1870 she published Teresa, a romantic novel with political overtones that was set in the early days of the Independence of Chile and "breaks the conventional parameters of the approach to the subject of women in 19th century Chilean literature."

This trilogy transformed Rosario Orrego into one of the forerunners of the Hispanic American novel, together with Juana Manso, Mercedes Marín, Gertrudis Gómez de Avellaneda, Júlia Lopes de Almeida, Clorinda Matto de Turner, Juana Manuela Gorriti, and Mercedes Cabello de Carbonera, among others.

=== Poetry ===
She also ventured into poetry, a literary genre that she approached through several contributions to the magazine La Semana, which she signed with the pseudonym "Una Madre" (A Mother). During this time she had a self-critical sense of her work, saying, "I could estimate how little those poor verses were worth, because they were criticized in my presence." This anonymity lasted fourteen years, until in 1872 at the urging of her friends and editors, she chose to sign works with her name. Along with the Atacama writers Mercedes Marín and Nicolasa Montt, Orrego is considered one of the pioneers of women's poetry in Chile.

=== Journalism ===
In 1873 Orrego founded and edited the magazine Valparaíso, a bi-weekly periodical dedicated to the arts, letters and sciences. Here she published press releases along with her children Regina, Luis, and Laura. It was in this magazine that she published her third novel, Teresa. For her work, she is considered an important early figure in the development of journalism in Chile.

== Personal life ==
In 1848, aged 14, Orrego married Juan José Uribe Moya. Orrego and Uribe had five children, among them writers Ángela Uribe de Alcalde, Luis Uribe Orrego, and Regina Orrego Uribe, the first woman in Chile to receive the title of bachillerato in humanities).

After being widowed, she married jurist, journalist, and writer Jacinto Chacón Barrios in 1874.

== Select bibliography ==
- Alberto el jugador (Santiago: Editorial Cuarto Propio, 2001; 1860)
- Sus mejores poemas, artículos y su novela corta "Teresa" (Santiago: Editorial Nascimento, 1931)
- Obra completa: Rosario Orrego 1831–1879 (Copiapó: [s.n.], 2003)
