= Rodrigo Orrego =

Chilean opera singer

- Born: Santiago de Chile
- Genres: Opera
- Occupation: Opera tenor
- Website: www.rodrigoorrego.com

Rodrigo Orrego is a Chilean opera tenor.

== Biography ==
Orrego was born in Santiago de Chile. He studied music history and voice at the Universidad Católica de Chile and graduated afterwards with Prof. Aldo Baldin at the Musikhochschule Karlsruhe, Germany.

As a student, Orrego performed with ensembles and orchestras such as the Müncher Philharmoniker, the Berliner Philharmoniker, and English Chamber Orchestra), and appeared at concert halls such as the Herkulessaal and Philharmonie Gasteig in Munich, the Musikverein in Vienna and the Seoul Art Center in Korea. Orrego received his first contract at the Staatstheater Darmstadt. His repertoire contains the big oratories, as well as Gustav Mahler´s Lied von der Erde and the Symphony No. 9 (Beethoven). In 2007 in Bogotá, Colombia, he took part as a soloist in Verdi´s “Messa da Requiem” under Andrés Orozco, a performance that was recorded live for DVD.

== Opera career ==
Orrego made his debut as Hoffmann (Les contes d'Hoffmann) at the Landestheater Linz, later reprising the role in Darmstadt, Gießen, Bern, Burgos, and at the Teatro Cervantes in Málaga. In Vienna and Munich he sang Tamino in Mozart´s “Zauberflöte” with the English Chamber Orchestra. At the Theater Erfurt Orrego sang the principal role in “Fernand Cortez” by Spontini and, later, at the Teatro Municipal in Santiago de Chile, the part of Cavaradossi in “Tosca” by Puccini. The Teatro de la Maestranza in Seville called him for the role of Gonzalve in Ravel´s “L'heure espagnole”. Gießen concluded a contract with him to sing Foresto in Verdi's opera “Attila” and Tel Aviv for the role of Bacchus in “Ariadne auf Naxos” (Richard Strauss) and Faust in “Mefistofele” (Arrigo Boito). Vicenza presented Mozart´s “Zaide” in the Teatro Olimpico. Orrego sang the part of Soliman. Afterwards he sang the parts of Pinkerton in “Madame Butterfly” (Puccini) and Pollione in “Norma” by Bellini. Santiago de Chile chose Orrego for the principal role in the world premiere of the opera “Fulgor y muerte de Joaquín Murieta” by the Chilean composer Sergio Ortega (libretto by Pablo Neruda), a production which was celebrated successfully also at the Savonlinna Opera Festival in Finland.

In Paris, in the Salle Pleyel, Orrego sang Oswald in Schubert´s opera “Des Teufels Lustschloß” with the Orchestre Philharmonique de Radio France conducted by Marek Janowsky. A highlight in the singer´s career was the tenor role in the opera “Fervaal” by Vincent d'Indy, a monumental oeuvre which was rediscovered by the Bern Theater. It was presented in concert form in its entire length in 2009.

In recent years, Orrego has expanded his opera repertoire with roles in lirico-spinto, such as "Andrea Chénier" (Umberto Giordano), "Manon Lescaut" (Puccini) and "Otello" (Verdi). Numerous recordings document his career.

== Recordings ==
- "Carmina Burana", by Carl Orff conducted by Gabor Ötvös (1999)
- "Mass in B minor", by J.S. Bach (1997)
- "Christmas Oratorio", by J.S. Bach, conducted by Rolf Beck (1995)
- Masses by Franz Schubert, (1996)
- "Mass Op.87", by Heinrich von Herzogenberg, conducted by Ralf Otto (1997)
- "Missa Solemnis #2", by Luigi Cherubini, conducted by Hans Rudolf Zöbeley (1992)
- "Faust", by Ludwig Spohr, conducted by Klaus Arp (1994)
- "Die Verschwornen", by Franz Schubert, conducted by Christoph Spering (1996)
- Music for the King of Spain, various composers, conducted by Pavel Baxa (1996)
