= Jeannette Sorrell =

American musician

Jeannette Sorrell is an American conductor and harpsichordist. A Grammy Award winner, she is the founder and music director of Apollo's Fire Baroque Orchestra. She is the subject of the 2019 documentary by Oscar-winning director Allan Miller, Playing With Fire: Jeannette Sorrell and the Mysteries of Conducting (commercially released in 2023).

== Biography ==
=== Youth ===
Jeannette Sorrell was born in San Francisco in 1965. Her father, a Jewish Romanian immigrant, was a drama critic, linguist, and professor. Her mother, an American, was a nursing professor. According to the London Jewish Chronicle, Sorrell's father was a Holocaust survivor who completely hid his story and his Jewish identity from the family until he was 87.

Jeannette Sorrell grew up studying piano, violin, ballet and theatre. In an interview with the Cleveland Plain Dealer, she describes how she spent her first year of piano lessons (at the age of 9) practicing on a paper keyboard that she made, because the family had no piano. Her family moved to the Shenandoah Valley area of Virginia when she was 14. This is where she first encountered early American folk music and shape-note hymns, which later developed into an artistic interest for her. At 16 she began studying conducting and composition, and founded an instrumental and vocal ensemble for which she arranged all of the music.

=== Studies: 1988-91 ===
Sorrell received a full scholarship to the Artist Diploma program of Oberlin Conservatory, where she studied harpsichord with Lisa Crawford and orchestral conducting with Robert Spano. At age 24 she became one of the youngest students in the conducting program at the Tanglewood Festival, where she studied under Leonard Bernstein and Sir Roger Norrington. She was the only woman in the conducting class. Upon graduating from Oberlin in 1990, she was chosen as a conducting fellow at the Aspen Music Festival.

She then moved to Amsterdam to study harpsichord with Gustav Leonhardt. The following year she won First Prize and the Audience Choice Award in the 1991 Spivey International Harpsichord Competition held in Atlanta, GA, competing in a field of 70 contestants from Europe, the former Soviet Union, Israel and the U.S.

=== Founding of Apollo's Fire ===
In 1991, Sorrell returned to the U.S. and was immediately invited to interview for the position of Assistant Conductor with The Cleveland Orchestra. She had not applied for the job, but was recruited as a candidate based on her conducting work at Aspen and Tanglewood. In various media interviews, Sorrell has recounted her meeting with Cleveland Orchestra Music Director Christoph von Dohnanyi, who told her that he could not give her an audition because the audience in Cleveland would never accept a woman as a conductor. Sorrell replied that she had actually not sought this post and she really wanted to work with period instruments. Following this interview, the orchestra's artistic administrator Roger Wright offered to help Sorrell launch a period-instrument orchestra in Cleveland. Sorrell was 26.

The ensemble made its debut in 1992 under the name of Apollo's Fire - The Cleveland Baroque Orchestra. The debut concerts were sold out. Apollo's Fire began receiving touring invitations within a few months. Since then, Sorrell has led Apollo's Fire as Artistic Director and has developed an international reputation for creative programming.

== Career ==
=== Apollo's Fire ===
Sorrell's focus with Apollo's Fire has been the 18th-century ideal of Affekt, in which the performers use rhetoric and dramatic inflection to move the emotional moods of the listeners. She has been credited with "forging a vibrant and life-affirming approach to the re-making of early music" (BBC Magazine). Twelve of her CD recordings have become bestsellers on the Billboard classical chart. In addition, she has led Apollo's Fire on tour at Carnegie Hall, the BBC Proms, London's Wigmore Hall, the Royal Theatre (Teatro Real) of Madrid, the Heidelberg Spring Festival, St Martin-in-the-Fields, the Grand Opera House of Bordeaux, the Aspen, Tanglewood, and Ravinia Festivals, the Boston Early Music Festival and extensive North American tours of the Brandenburg Concertos and the Monteverdi Vespers. In Cleveland, Sorrell's concerts with Apollo's Fire are admired for consistently drawing one of the largest audiences in the country for period-instrument music. Since 2021, Apollo's Fire is also in residence in Chicago.

In 1999 Sorrell launched the multicultural folk wing of Apollo's Fire, consisting of hand-picked artists who are steeped in world music traditions as well as historical performance.

=== Discography ===
In 2010, Sorrell received international attention when the British record label AVIE released her CD recording of Bach's Brandenburg Concertos and two harpsichord concertos into the European market for the first time. The Sunday Times (London) called it "a swaggering version… The most is made of the instrumental colours Bach so exhilaratingly put on show. The keyboard part in the 5th Brandenburg is brilliantly played by Sorrell." Early Music America called it "stunning... A fabulous harpsichord cadenza played with gusto by Sorrell... perfectly polished." Audiophile Audition wrote, "Nothing short of spectacular... Jeannette Sorrell is something of a wunderkind." The American Record Guide wrote, "Sorrell leads from the harpsichord and delivers a brilliant take-no-captives rendition of the big solo in No. 5. In all, these performances are lively and unfailingly attractive — the best in what historical performance can be."

Shortly thereafter, AVIE released Sorrell's recording of the Monteverdi Vespers. This too received international attention, and become a Top 10 best-seller on the Billboard classical chart in October 2010. The Sunday Times called it "Exultant... instrumental colours blaze brilliantly." Fanfare hailed the disc as "a stunning achievement.... Wins out handily over William Christie's versions and other recent issues." The International Record Review wrote that "Sorrell and her fine young choir lavish attention on every phrase and inflexion. The exhilaration and sense of discovery is utterly infectious... an unanticipated delight."

Sorrell won a GRAMMY in 2019 for the concept-album “Songs of Orpheus,” with Apollo’s Fire and tenor Karim Sulayman.

Sorrell has over 30 CD recordings, including the Bach St John Passion and Vivaldi’s Four Seasons which have been chosen as best in the field by the SUNDAY TIMES of London (2020 and 2021) Her Monteverdi Vespers recording was chosen by BBC Music Magazine as one of "30 Must-Have Recordings for Our Lifetime" (September 2022). discography also includes the complete Brandenburg Concerti and harpsichord concerti of Bach (Billboard Classical Top 10 in 2012), four discs of Mozart, Handel’s Messiah, and five creative crossover projects, including Sephardic Journey (Billboard World Music #2, Classical #7) and Christmas on Sugarloaf Mountain (Billboard Classical #3, and named “Festive Disc of the Year” by Gramophone).

=== Guest conducting ===
Sorrell made her New York Philharmonic debut in 2021 to rave reviews (New York Times critic Anthony Tomasini). The following year she made her Philadelphia Orchestra debut, with Philadelphia Inquirer chief critic David Patrick Stearns writing, "The Philadelphia Orchestra performed its freshest Messiah in years. Jeannette Sorrell was on the podium, bringing revelations.”

She returned to the New York Philharmonic in 2023, leading her own adaptation of Handel's Israel in Egypt.

Sorrell has repeatedly conducted the Pittsburgh Symphony, St Paul Chamber Orchestra, Seattle Symphony, Utah Symphony, Florida Orchestra, Philharmonia Baroque in San Francisco, and New World Symphony; and has also led the Philadelphia Orchestra, Royal Scottish National Orchestra, Royal Liverpool Philharmonic, Festival Orchestra of Lincoln Center (NYC), Baltimore Symphony, the National Symphony at the Kennedy Center, Houston Symphony, Los Angeles Chamber Orchestra, Indianapolis Symphony, Opera St Louis with the St Louis Symphony, the National Arts Centre Orchestra (Ottawa), Calgary Philharmonic (Canada), Royal Northern Sinfonia (UK), Orquesta Sinfónica de Castilla y León (Spain), Grand Rapids Symphony, North Carolina Symphony, and the Orchestra of St Luke’s at Carnegie Hall, among others.

=== Awards ===
Sorrell is the recipient of the Noah Greenberg Award from the American Musicological Society; and the Cleveland Arts Prize (2017). She is a 2-time winner of the "American Masterpieces" grant from the National Endowment for the Arts for her work on early American music. She holds an honorary doctorate from Case Western Reserve University. In 2024, she received the Herrick Award from the Early Settlers Association of the Western Reserve for her contributions to Cleveland.

=== Civic activist ===
Sorrell is a frequent speaker to civic and student groups on topics such as entrepreneurial leadership, women as leaders, and building new audiences for the arts. She has also been active as a political volunteer.
