= Apollo's Fire =

American early music ensemble

Apollo's Fire Baroque Orchestra
- Orchestra
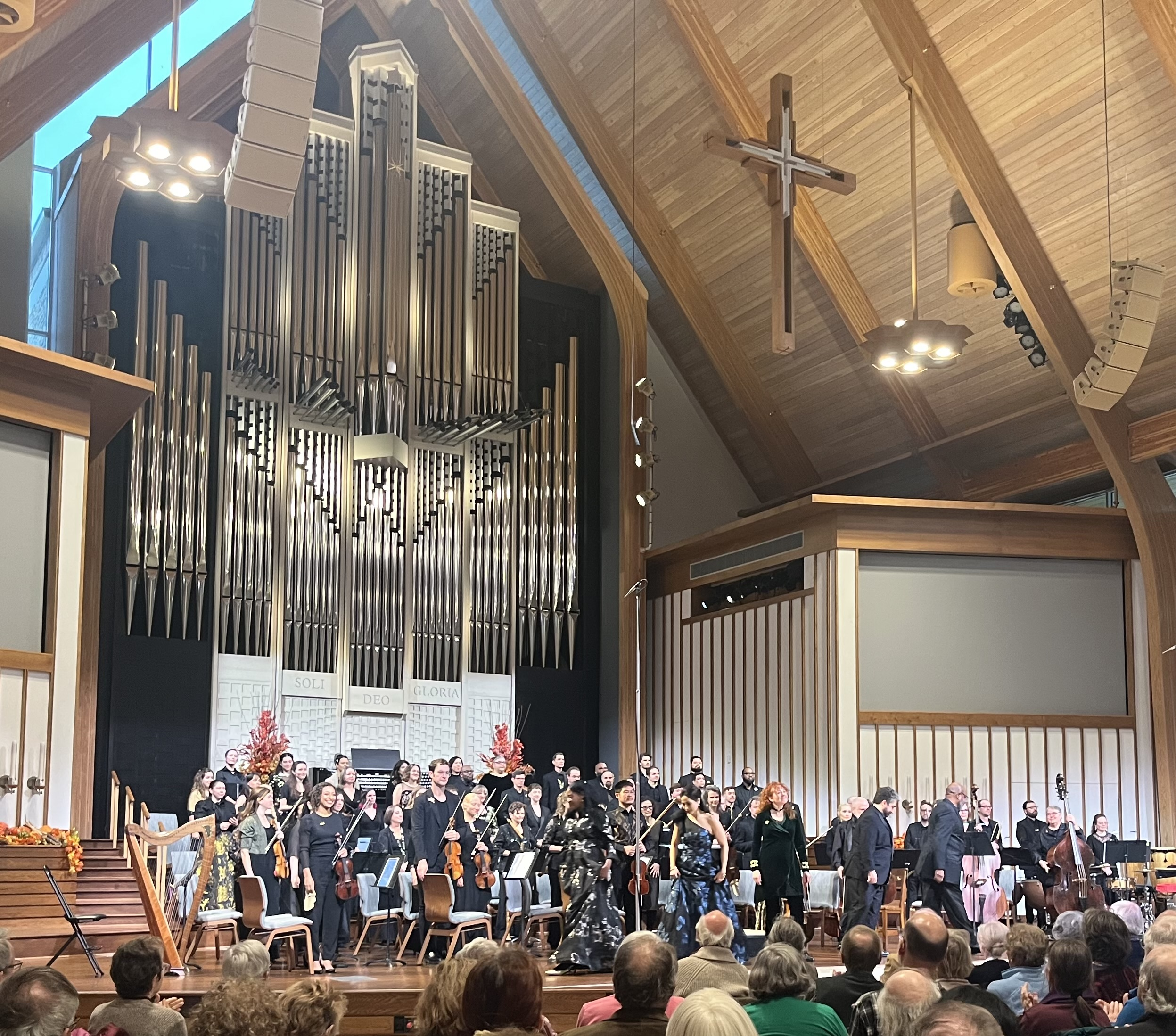
- Apollo’s Fire
- Short name: Apollo's Fire
- Founded: 1992
- Location: Cleveland, Ohio and Chicago
- Principal conductor: Jeannette Sorrell
- Website: apollosfire.org

Apollo's Fire Baroque Orchestra is a period-instrument ensemble specializing in early music (Renaissance, Baroque, Classical, and early Romantic). The ensemble is based in Cleveland, Ohio and, since 2021, also in Chicago. The ensemble is composed of early music specialists from throughout North America and Europe, and led by conductor/harpsichordist Jeannette Sorrell. Apollo's Fire and Jeannette Sorrell won a GRAMMY Award in 2018, shared with tenor Karim Sulayman.

== Founding and early history ==
Named after the Greek god of music and the sun, Apollo's Fire was founded in 1992 by the American conductor and harpsichordist Jeannette Sorrell. Sorrell, who was 26 at the time, had assistance from Roger Wright, who was then Artistic Administrator of the Cleveland Orchestra. Sorrell came to the attention of Wright through recommendations from conducting faculty at the Aspen Music Festival and Tanglewood Music Festival where she had studied under Leonard Bernstein, Roger Norrington and others. Wright was handling the Cleveland Orchestra's search for an assistant conductor, and he invited Sorrell to an interview for the position. The interview was conducted by Cleveland Orchestra Music Director Christoph von Dohnányi along with Roger Wright. During the interview, Dohnányi told Sorrell that there was "no point in finding time with the orchestra for her to audition, as the audience in Cleveland would never accept a woman as a conductor." Sorrell replied that she had not applied for this job, and her true goal was to work with a period-instrument orchestra. Following this encounter, Wright decided to help Sorrell launch a period-instrument orchestra.

The orchestra received a start-up grant from the Cleveland Foundation in 1992, and made its debut in June of that year. Apollo's Fire then began receiving touring invitations from concert series presenters, and has been an active touring ensemble since its first season.

In 2004 Sorrell launched a multicultural/folk wing of Apollo's Fire – a troupe specializing in traditional music (Celtic, Appalachian, Sephardic), performed on period instruments in a historically informed aesthetic. Apollo's Fire was awarded major grants through the NEA American Masterpieces initiative in 2009 and 2010 for Jeannette Sorrell's research, creation, and recording of the innovative crossover program, "Come to the River: An Early American Gathering." This recording became a top-10 bestseller on Billboard Classical in 2011. The album was hailed by the American Record Guide as "one of the most joyous releases, intoxicated by the sheer joy of being alive."

== Awards and honors ==
- 2019: Grammy Award for Best Classical Solo Vocal Album
