= Prig =

Person with a zealous approach to etiquette

In British English, a prig (/prɪɡ/) is a person who shows an inordinately zealous approach to matters of form and propriety—especially where the prig has the ability to show superior knowledge to those who do not know the protocol in question. They see little need to consider the feelings or intentions of others, relying instead on established order and rigid rules to resolve all questions.

The prig approaches social interactions with a strong sense of self-righteousness.

== Etymology and usage ==
The first edition of H.W. Fowler's Modern English Usage has the following definition:

A prig is a believer in red tape; that is, he exalts the method above the work done. A prig, like the Pharisee, says: "God, I thank thee that I am not as other men are"—except that he often substitutes Self for God. A prig is one who works out his paltry accounts to the last farthing, while his millionaire neighbour lets accounts take care of themselves. A prig expects others to square themselves to his very inadequate measuring rod, and condemns them with confidence if they do not. A prig is wise beyond his years in all things that do not matter. A prig cracks nuts with a steamhammer: that is, calls in the first principles of morality to decide whether he may, or must, do something of as little importance as drinking a glass of beer. On the whole, one may, perhaps, say that all his different characteristics come from the combination, in varying proportions, of three things—the desire to do his duty, the belief that he knows better than other people, and blindness to the difference in value between different things.

The character of the prig was encapsulated in Charles Dickens' portrait of the day-nurse Betsy Prig—capable of a "rapid change from banter to ferocity" but always referred to by night-nurse Sairah Gamp as "the best of creeturs"—in his novel Martin Chuzzlewit:

The best among us have their failings, and it must be conceded of Mrs Prig, that if there were a blemish in the goodness of her disposition, it was a habit she had of not bestowing all its sharp and acid properties upon her patients (as a thoroughly amiable woman would have done), but of keeping a considerable remainder for the service of her friends. Highly pickled salmon, and lettuces chopped up in vinegar, may, as viands possessing some acidity of their own, have encouraged and increased this failing in Mrs Prig; and every application to the teapot certainly did; for it was often remarked of her by her friends, that she was most contradictory when most elevated. It is certain that her countenance became about this time derisive and defiant, and that she sat with her arms folded, and one eye shut up, in a somewhat offensive, obstrusively intelligent manner.

A glimpse of Mrs Prig's nursing technique is afforded by the following exchange, as Sarah Gamp arrives to take over from Mrs Prig in the supervision of a patient:

'And how are we by this time?' Mrs Gamp observed. 'We looks charming.'

'We looks a deal charminger than we are, then,' returned Mrs Prig, a little chafed in her temper. 'We got out of bed back'ards, I think, for we're as cross as two sticks. I never see sich a man. He wouldn't have been washed, if he'd had his own way.'

'She put the soap in my mouth,' said the unfortunate patient feebly.

'Couldn't you keep it shut then?' retorted Mrs Prig. 'Who do you think's to wash one feater, and miss another, and wear one's eyes out with all manner of fine work of that description, for half-a-crown a day! If you wants to be tittivated, you must pay accordin'.'

'Oh dear me!' cried the patient, 'oh dear, dear!'

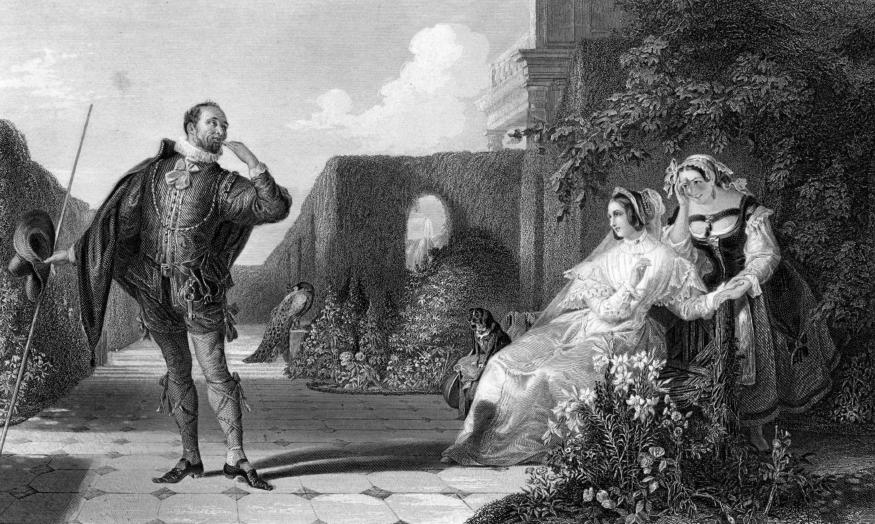
Malvolio: "a prig with an instinct for grandeur".

Another portrait of a prig is that of Malvolio in Shakespeare's Twelfth Night. Robert. E. Ornstein has carefully detailed the characteristics of Malvolio's priggishness:

Those who do not enjoy Malvolio would reduce him to a conventional killjoy, a scapegoat who deserves to be held up to ridicule because of his officious humourlessness. There would be a need to expose Malvolio if he pretended to be something he is not, but he never puts on a false manner; his absurdity is native and his egotism so openly displayed that even Olivia, who appreciates his talents, very early accuses him of being ungenerous and "sick of self-love". Incapable of hypocrisy or sanctimony, he is genuinely outraged by Toby's revelries, which offend his sense of propriety and defy his authority. He is a prig with an instinct for grandeur that at once muddles his statements and endows them with an ineffable grandiosity.

Typical of Malvolio's priggish response to irreverent behaviour is his objection to the singing of Sir Toby Belch, Sir Andrew Aguecheek and Feste: "Do ye make an alehouse of my lady's house, that ye squeak out your coziers’ catches without any mitigation or remorse of voice?"

== Other terms with similar meanings ==
- Prissy
- Prim and proper
- Prude/prudish
- Mrs Grundy
- Old fashioned values
- Victorian
- Goody-goody or goody-two-shoes

== See also ==
- Blue law
- Bureaucracy
- Erotophobia
- Feminist sex wars
- Fuddy-duddy
- Jobsworth
- Openness to experience
- Politically correct
- Prude
- Red tape
- Sexual abstinence
- Social norm
- Stickler
- Typical intellectual engagement
- Victorian morality
