= Aptitude =

Ability; competence to do a certain kind of work at a certain level

An aptitude is a component of a competence to do a certain kind of work at a certain level. Outstanding aptitude can be considered "talent", or "skill". Aptitude is inborn potential to perform certain kinds of activities, whether physical or mental, and whether developed or undeveloped. Aptitude is often contrasted with skills and abilities, which are developed through learning. The mass term ability refers to components of competence acquired through a combination of both aptitude and skills.

According to Gladwell (2008) and Colvin (2008), it is often difficult to set apart the influence of talent from the influence of hard training in the case of outstanding performances. Howe, Davidson, and Sloboda argue that talents are acquired rather than innate. Talented individuals generally show high levels of competence immediately in only a narrow range of activities, often comprising only a single direction or genre.

== Intelligence and aptitude ==
Aptitude and IQ are different but related concepts relating to human mental ability. Unlike the original idea of IQ, aptitude often refers to one of the many different characteristics which can be independent of each other, such as aptitude for military flight, air traffic control, or computer programming. This approach measures a variety of separate skills, similar to the theory of multiple intelligences and Cattell–Horn–Carroll theory and many other modern theories of intelligence. In general, aptitude tests are more likely to be designed and used for career and employment decisions, and intelligence tests are more likely to be used for educational and research purposes. However, there is a great deal of overlap between them, and they often measure the same kinds of abilities. For example, aptitude tests such as the Armed Services Vocational Aptitude Battery measure enough aptitudes that they could also serve as a measure of general intelligence.

A single construct such as mental ability is measured with multiple tests. Often, a person's group of test scores will be highly correlated with each other, which makes a single measure useful in many cases. For example, the U.S. Department of Labor's General Learning Ability is determined by combining Verbal, Numerical and Spatial aptitude scores. However, many individuals have skills that are much higher or lower than their overall mental ability level. Aptitude subtests are used intra-individually to determine which tasks that individual is more skilled at performing. This information can be useful for determining which job roles are the best fits for employees or applicants. Often, before more rigorous aptitude tests are used, individuals are screened for a basic level of aptitude through a previously completed process, such as SAT scores, GRE scores, GATE scores, degrees, or other certifications.

== Common aptitude tests ==
Examples of aptitude tests include;

- Logical reasoning tests: Logical reasoning tests examine how you come to see the difference or similarities between patterns and shapes.
- Verbal reasoning tests: Verbal reasoning tests will determine the way you have defined or obtained information from within short passage or paragraph.
- In-tray exercises: Also called e-tray exercise, in-tray exercises is to determine your prioritization and organizational abilities required in the workplace.
- Watson Glaser critical thinking tests: The Watson Glaser critical thinking test determines your ability to analyze any set of information to see how well you understand it and draw from it a logical conclusion.
- Situational judgment tests: Situational judgment tests measure how you solve problems at work using various workplace scenarios.
- Numerical reasoning tests: Numerical reasoning tests determine how you use numbers and calculations to solve mathematical problems.
- Diagrammatic reasoning tests: Diagrammatic reasoning tests give you patterns and diagrams from which you must find the next step in the chain and provide the next step in the pattern using logic.

== Combined aptitude and knowledge tests ==
Tests that assess learned skills or knowledge are frequently called achievement tests. However, certain tests can assess both types of constructs. An example that leans both ways is the Armed Services Vocational Aptitude Battery (ASVAB), which is given to recruits entering the armed forces of the United States. Another is the SAT, which is designed as a test of aptitude for college in the United States, but has achievement elements. For example, it tests mathematical reasoning, which depends both on mathematical ability and education received in mathematics.

Aptitude tests can typically be grouped according to the type of cognitive ability they measure, whether that be fluid or crystallized intelligence.

== See also ==
- General learning ability
- Skill
- Spatial visualization ability
- Learning disability
- Typical intellectual engagement
- Need for cognition
- Intellectual curiosity

== Bibliography ==
- Colvin, Geoff (2008). Talent is overrated: What really separate world-class performers from everybody else. New York: Portfolio, Penguin Group. ISBN 978-1-59184-224-8.
- Gladwell, Malcolm (2008). Outliers: The story of Success. New York: Little, Brown & Co. ISBN 978-0-316-03669-6.
