= Prude =

Instance of prim behaviour or talk

A prude is a person with a very sensitive attitude and narrowness towards custom and morality. The word prude comes from the Old French word prudefemme also prodefemme meaning loyal, respectable or modest woman, which was the source of prude in the 18th century. According to Pierer's Universal Lexikon in 1861, prudery is "modest in an exaggerated and affected way; seeming delicate, squeamish". In a broader sense, prudery refers to an attitude of mind that aims to largely exclude sexual expressions of any kind in public and sometimes also in the private sphere. This applies above all to the portrayal or even suggestion of eroticism in tone and image form, fashion, mass media, literature, historical testimonies, and conversation.

== Pejorative use ==
The word is generally considered in modern times a pejorative term to suggest fear and contempt of human sexuality and excessive, unusual modesty stemming from such a negative view of sexuality. It is hence unflattering, and often used as an insult. A person with such an attitude to sexuality may have reservations about nudity, public display of sexual affection, discussion of sexual matters, or participating in romantic or sexual activity—reservations that exceed normal prevailing community standards. Exhibiting fear and discomfort with sexuality may be associated with advocating censorship of sexuality or nudity in the media, avoiding or condemning any public display of affection.

The degree of prudery understood as fearful contempt of human sexuality can vary among different cultures and traditions.

Another use of "prude" is as a label and an insult directed to anybody having reservations resulting from standards of modesty or even any moral standards and beliefs which are not shared by the offender. Thus one can be labeled a "prude" for expressing reservations about drinking alcohol, consuming other drugs, or participating in mischief. When prudishness or prudish attitudes are viewed as part of a wider process it is sometimes called prudification.

In this meaning, the term generally has a relative sense. For example, one may be viewed as having relatively lax standards regarding sexuality and drug usage compared to the overall population in which one resides, but compared to a smaller, specific subculture with more permissive standards, one may appear to be unduly strict and thus be labeled a prude when one refuses to participate in more liberal seeming behaviors.

Synonyms of "prude" include: goody-goody (in certain contexts) and Mrs Grundy.

== See also ==
- Antisexualism
- Christian Right
- Erotophobia
- Feminist sex wars
- Fuddy-duddy
- Homophobia
- Obscenity Prosecution Task Force
- Openness to experience
- Prig
- Promiscuity
- Puritan
- Sexual abstinence
- Social norm
- Stickler
- Victorian morality
