= Camille Zamora =

American singer (born 1976)

- Occupations: Soprano; Co-founder of Sing For Hope
- Website: camillezamora.com

Camille Zamora (born December 14, 1976) is an American soprano recognized for her performance of opera, zarzuela, oratorio, art song and American songbook. She performs repertoire ranging from the early Baroque to 21st century premieres by composers including Grammy Award winners Robert Aldridge and Herschel Garfein as well as Rome Prize winner Christopher Theofanidis.

Of Spanish ancestry on her father's side, Zamora has performed works in Italian, German, French, Russian, Czech, and Chinese as well as her native English and Spanish. Reviewers from The New York Times, The Wall Street Journal and The Houston Chronicle have praised her "dramatic, nuanced readings," her "divine soprano," and "the richness of her fabulously colorful and unwaveringly powerful soprano instrument," respectively.

Camille Zamora and fellow Juilliard graduate Monica Yunus are co-founders of Sing For Hope.

== Early life and education ==
Zamora grew up in Houston, Texas, and Mexico City, where her parents, former Peace Corps volunteers, were teachers. Zamora studied voice and piano at the High School for the Performing and Visual Arts (HSPVA) in Houston, which honored her with the 2010 Distinguished Alumni Award.

Zamora attended The Juilliard School, where she received her Master of Music in voice in 2002 and her Artist Diploma in opera studies in 2004. She was a member of the Juilliard Opera Center. At Juilliard, Zamora performed various principal roles, including the Countess in The Marriage of Figaro, the Governess in The Turn of the Screw, Diane in Orphée aux Enfers and Ermione in Oreste.

Zamora's training also included an apprenticeship in the Young Artists Program at Glimmerglass Opera, an opera fellowship at Aspen Music Festival and a Lucrezia Bori fellowship to study at Istituto Dante Alighieri in Siena, Italy.

== Career ==
Zamora has performed internationally with ensembles including Orchestra of St. Luke's, the London Symphony Orchestra, the Guadalajara Symphony, the American Symphony Orchestra, the Rochester Philharmonic Orchestra, the Aberdeen Festival Orchestra, and the Boston Festival Orchestra, among others.

Some of her performances are: Twin Spirits: Robert and Clara Schumann with Sting, Joshua Bell, and Nathan Gunn at Lincoln Center for the Performing Arts and LA's Music Center; La Voix Humaine at Auckland (New Zealand) Opera and the Phoenicia International Festival; Così fan tutte at Glimmerglass and Virginia Operas; Idomeneo at Boston Lyric Opera; Don Giovanni at Anchorage Opera; L'incoronazione di Poppea at Houston Grand Opera; Ariadne auf Naxos at Utah Opera; Luisa Fernanda at Los Angeles Opera; Oreste at Festival dei Due Mondi Spoleto; Die Liebe der Danae with American Symphony Orchestra; The Rainforest Cantata at Spoleto Festival USA; Johann Sebastian Bach’s Magnificat at Carnegie Hall; Ludwig van Beethoven’s Mass in C at Alice Tully Hall; the world premiere of Christopher Theofanidis’ Song of Elos at Carnegie Hall and at the American Academy in Rome; and the title roles in Susannah, Alcina, and Anna Bolena.

Zamora has appeared in concert with New York Festival of Song and the Lincoln Center Festival, performed solo recitals for Carnegie Hall’s Musical Connections Series and the Sarasota Artist Series, and has been featured in live recital broadcasts on NPR, BBC Radio, Deutsche Radio, and Sirius XM Radio.

Zamora has performed and recorded principal roles in La verbena de la Paloma, La Revoltosa, and Luisa Fernanda. Her other recording include An AIDS Quilt Songbook: Sing for Hope, and three albums with American Symphony Orchestra conducted by Leon Botstein: Schubert's Die Verschworenen, Strauss’ Die Liebe der Danae and Hindemith's The Long Christmas Dinner. In 2017, Zamora partnered with Glen Roven to produce “The Hillary Speeches,” a filmed concert including two of Hillary Clinton’s watershed speeches set to music. Zamora was also an associate producer on the album Presidential Suite: Eight Variations on Freedom which won the Grammy Award for Best Large Jazz Ensemble Album in 2016.

Zamora was featured with Yo-Yo Ma, Cristina Pato, and other artists of The Silk Road Ensemble in The Music of Strangers, the documentary film by Academy Award-winning director Morgan Neville.

Zamora also writes a column on arts and culture for the Huffington Post. She has been a speaker on arts and culture panels at The Aspen Ideas Festival, The Fortune Most Powerful Women's Summit, The Huffington Post Third Metric Summit and Opera America.

Zamora has taught masterclasses and led seminars at universities and conservatories including Harvard University, the University of Oxford, University of Kentucky, and The Juilliard School.

== Sing for Hope ==
In 2006, Zamora joined with fellow opera singer and Juilliard graduate Monica Yunus to form Sing For Hope, a New York City-based non-profit organization that brings arts outreach programs to communities in need and provides a network of support for artists who want to give back to their communities. Sing for Hope offers a broad range of arts outreach programming, connecting artists with under-resourced schools, healthcare facilities, and community-based organizations, and presenting projects, such as the 88 Sing for Hope Pianos in parks and public spaces across New York City, to increase arts accessibility.

The Sing for Hope model for artist-community engagement traces it roots to the annual AIDS fundraising gala concert that Zamora founded in memory of her late friend, tenor Frank Logan. In 2012, Zamora was featured in the AIDS Quilt Songbook 20th Anniversary Concert in New York City, premiering works by Herschel Garfein, Robert Aldridge, and Scott Gendel. The concert was produced by Sing for Hope to commemorate the classical music world's first organized response to the AIDS crisis.

Sing for Hope puts artist-designed pianos on the streets of New York City for public use. 50 pianos were donated to public schools across the five boroughs in 2017.

== Recognition ==
Zamora was named one of CNN's Most Intriguing People in 2010. In 2013, she was named one of the "Top 50 Americans in Philanthropy" by Town and Country Magazine, featured as "New Yorker of the Week" by NY1, and profiled on NBC Latino. Zamora was recognized by the Ladies Home Journal as one of the "16 Women That Made the World Happier." Beginning in 2012, Houston's Mayor Annise Parker presented the Camille Zamora Award to individuals who donate to Bering Omega Community Services for HIV/AIDS research. The annual award, created by the Bering Omega Board of Trustees, has expanded to honor individuals and organizations that make significant contributions to the Houston area community impacted by HIV/AIDS.

Zamora has performed at the United Nations and The Fortune Most Powerful Women Summit. Zamora received a World Harmony Run Torch-Bearer Award in 2010, and has been recognized by the Congressional Hispanic Caucus. In 2016, Zamora was named a Kennedy Center Citizen Artist.
