= Sing for Hope =

Non-profit organization in New York City

- Founded: 2001; 25 years ago
- Founders: Camille Zamora, Monica Yunus
- Type: Non-profit organization
- Purpose: humanitarian
- Headquarters: Midtown Manhattan
- Location: New York City, United States
- Region served: New York City
- Website: singforhope.org

Sing for Hope is a nonprofit global arts nonprofit headquartered in New York City. In the days following 9/11, Juilliard students Monica Yunus and Camille Zamora brought live music directly to first responders at Engine 40/Ladder 35, witnessing firsthand how the arts bring immediate solace, connection, and shared humanity in times of crisis. That response sparked a movement to mobilize creative artists beyond traditional stages, laying the foundation for Sing for Hope’s global work at the intersection of arts, health, and community wellbeing.

Sing for Hope operates under the principle that access to the arts is a fundamental human right rather than a privilege, and serves tens of thousands of people annually through core programming in hospitals, schools, care facilities, centers for older adults, and transit hubs.

In 2026, Sing for Hope celebrates its 25th Anniversary, marking a quarter-century of mobilizing thousands of professional Artist Partners to bring dynamic arts programming to under-resourced communities across the United States and around the world.

== History and Mission ==
Sing for Hope was founded in New York City in 2001 by opera singers Monica Yunus and Camille Zamora in response to the September 11 attacks. Operating under the tagline "Sing for Hope: Creating a Better World through the Arts," the nonprofit organization was established on the belief that the arts are a conduit for hope with a capacity to heal, unite, educate, and transform individuals and communities.

Sing for Hope partners with individuals, schools, healthcare providers, and community organizations to create dynamic arts programming designed to expand arts access through organized, artist-led action.

== Principal programs ==
Sing for Hope operates its community, healthcare, and educational initiatives through five principal program areas:

=== Sing for Hope Pianos ===
Sing for Hope Pianos is a public art initiative that commissions artists to paint bespoke pianos, places them in high-traffic public spaces for public performance, and subsequently relocates and maintains them in public schools, healthcare centers, and community facilities. The program has placed hundreds of instruments throughout the New York City metropolitan area and in municipal installations globally, making it one of the largest civilian donors of acoustic pianos to public school systems.

=== Public Health & Wellbeing ===
The Public Health & Wellbeing program designs research-informed arts and music interventions within healthcare networks, public transit hubs, and civic centers. The program operates through three core divisions:

- Healing Arts: Produces live, genre-diverse musical performances tailored for patients, clinical staff, and family caregivers. Sing for Hope acts as the primary bedside and facility musical partner for NYC Health + Hospitals, the largest municipal public healthcare system in the United States.
- Creative Placemaking: Utilizes site-specific musical performances to foster social connection across major transit networks. Ongoing activation sites include Moynihan Train Hall and the Oculus at the World Trade Center in New York, the Port Authority Bus Terminal and Newark Liberty International Airport in New Jersey, and Union Station (Washington, D.C.).
- Creative Crisis Response: Delivers trauma-informed arts programming designed to mitigate chronic stress and aid social-emotional learning among refugee and displaced communities. Initiated in 2018 at Athens' Skaramagas refugee camp in partnership with El Sistema Greece, the initiative has since expanded arts programming across humanitarian sites in Southern Europe and Africa.

=== Education ===
Sing for Hope's education programming provides arts-integrated youth instruction and service-learning initiatives:

- Sing for Hope Lab: Delivers daily in-school arts curricula, after-school instruction, and summer enrichment programming for public school students across The Bronx and Southern Westchester.
- Sing for Hope HandaHarmony Youth Chorus: A choral ensemble serving youth ages 6–18 across the New York metropolitan area. Established through a multi-year endowment from the International Foundation for Arts and Culture and Japanese philanthropist Haruhisa Handa, the ensemble performs at civic events and international summits, including the United Nations High-level Political Forum on Sustainable Development.
- Global Goals Arts Curriculum: A free, digital curriculum platform for educators in grades 5–12 aligned with the National Core Arts Standards (NCAS). The interdisciplinary lesson modules integrate visual art, music, creative writing, dance/movement, and drama to educate students on the United Nations' 17 Sustainable Development Goals (SDGs).

=== Cultural Advocacy ===
The Cultural Advocacy program integrates creative activations into peacebuilding efforts, international policy dialogues, and civic convenings. Sing for Hope serves as the official cultural partner to the World Summit of Nobel Peace Laureates and has developed creative programming for global organizations and academic forums, including the Aspen Ideas Festival, Harvard University, The Fletcher School at Tufts University, the John F. Kennedy Center for the Performing Arts, the Skoll World Forum at the University of Oxford, and the United Nations.

=== Creative Workforce Development ===
Creative Workforce Development trains and compensates professional performing and visual artists as community placemakers and arts-in-health practitioners. Working alongside medical researchers and community specialists, participating artists receive practical training in trauma-informed facilitation and clinical protocol, creating structured economic opportunities for freelance artists within the public health and municipal sectors.

== List of artist partners ==
- Tituss Burgess
- Miley Cyrus
- Renée Fleming
- Nia Franklin
- Curt Hansen
- Erika Henningsen
- Hugh Jackman
- Jonas Brothers
- David Kaplan
- Chilina Kennedy
- Billie Jean King
- Demi Lovato
- Mary-Louise Parker
- Daphne Rubin-Vega
- Lea Salonga
- Nadine Sierra
- Carla Stickler
- Anthony Tommasini

== List of board members ==
- Jon Batiste
- David Beahm
- Devika Bhise
- Andrea Bocelli
- Rondi Charleston
- Jeffrey Chertoff
- Garance Choko
- Monique Coleman
- Renée Fleming
- Tahra Grant-Gale
- Eva Haller
- Linda E. Johnson
- Andrea Jung
- Rochelle King
- Emily Lenzner
- Margie Loeb
- Midori Miyazaki
- Josh Pultz
- Aurora Rosado
- Dr. Jill Sonke
- Kara Unterberg
- Damian Woetzel
- Monica Yunus
- Muhammad Yunus
- Camille Zamora
- Ann Ziff
