= Marm =

Marm may refer to:

- schoolmarm, a female teacher
- a female fuddy-duddy
- Fredericka Mandelbaum (1818–1894), a New York entrepreneur and criminal fence to many of the street gangs and criminals of the city's underworld, often called "Marm"
- Walter Joseph Marm Jr., (b. November 20, 1941) United States Army colonel, recipient of the Medal of Honor
