= Eva Haller =

American philanthropist, Holocaust survivor, and activist

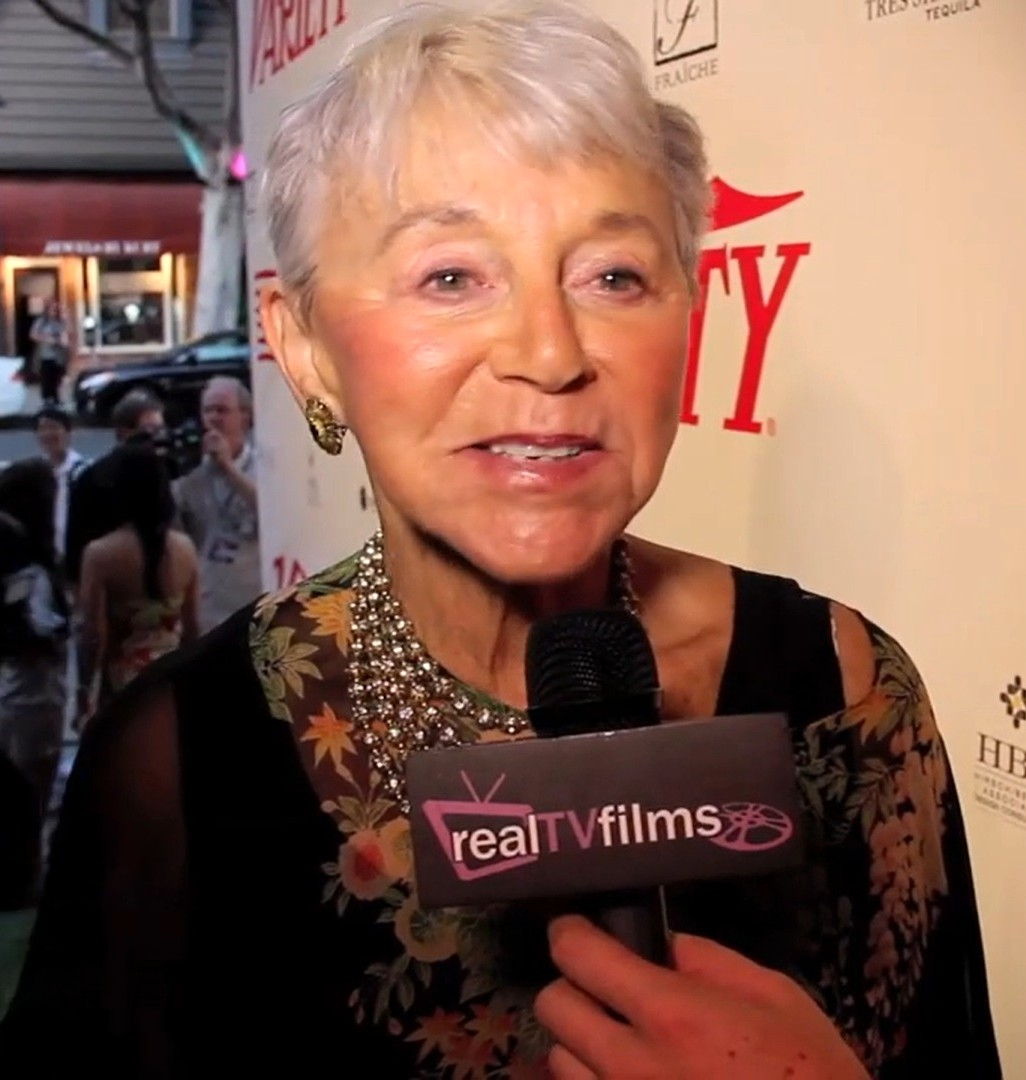
- Haller in 2012
- Born: Eva Cseko; May 9, 1930 (age 96); Budapest, Hungary
- Education: The New School for Social Research (B.A., Social Research); Hunter College (MSW., Social Work); Theodor Reik Clinic for Psychotherapy
- Occupation: Activist
- Notable work: Founding Board Chair, Free the Children, Trustee, UCSB; Founder & President, Campaign Communications Institute
- Spouse: Dr. Yoel Haller (1987-2025)

Eva Haller (born Eva Cseko, May 9, 1930) is an American philanthropist, Holocaust survivor, and activist. Haller was born in Budapest, Hungary. She survived the Nazi occupation of Hungary as well as the Soviet Siege of Budapest. She has engaged in and mentored countless organizations, serving as a board member, trustee, and passionate participant. Notable positions include Trustee of the University of California, Santa Barbara, co-founder and President of the Campaign Communications Institute of America, Visiting Professor at Glasgow Caledonian University and the 2014 Magnusson Fellow.

== Personal life ==
=== Early life ===
When Nazi German forces occupied Budapest in March 1944, Haller’s parents feared for her safety and brought her to the Scottish Mission Boarding School (St Columba’s, Church of Scotland). Missionary Jane Haining was the Matron of the School. When the missionaries were recalled and ordered to return to Scotland, Haining stayed to help the Jewish students and families. When it was discovered that the Institute was hiding Jews, Hungarian soldiers raided it, arrested Haining, and took her to the Gestapo.

According to Haller, as the Jews in the mission school were being rounded up to be taken to the ghetto, she turned to a Hungarian Nazi soldier and stated, “I am too young and too beautiful to die.” She then grabbed the hand of a 10-year-old neighbor, whom she promised to keep safe, telling him, “Run!”

Jane Haining was sent to do forced labor at Auschwitz concentration camp in May 1944; she died that July. She was the only Scottish citizen to die at Auschwitz. In 2014, Haller visited a church where Haining is honored in Glasgow, to pay tribute, and she was interviewed in a BBC documentary.

==== Early activism ====
Eva Haller has been an advocate for social justice since the age of thirteen, when she would sneak out with her brother, Janos, to assist him in distributing anti-Hitler pamphlets throughout Budapest. Janos, who was one of the Jewish partisans fighting the Nazis, was killed as he crossed the Yugoslavian border to join Tito’s army.

Haller says his death propelled her to be the social, educational, and environmental activist she is today. In her brother’s memory, she served as producer and advisor to the film Four Winters, by Julia Mintz, about the Jewish partisans who fought and disrupted the German army and its collaborators.

=== Post-War life ===
Briefly in hiding, Haller was reunited with her parents, who had purchased documents stating they were Christian. Many of her family members perished during World War II and the Nazi occupation of Hungary.

Her family was considered bourgeois by the new Soviet-allied government. In this regime, universities were reserved for the “working class”. Haller realized that she would have to leave Hungary in order get an education.

With the help of a former boyfriend, who worked in the passport office, and some funding from the Hebrew Immigrant Aid Society (HIAS), Haller joined distant cousins living in Ecuador. She spoke no Spanish and was married off very quickly. In 1952, Haller was a 22-year-old divorcee with a two-year-old son. She left for New York, where she cleaned houses in the day and took classes at night. She received a B.A. in psychology at the New School for Social Research. Later, she received her Masters of Social Work (M.S.W.) at Hunter College. In 1965, she joined Rev. Dr. Martin Luther King Jr. in the Selma march.

Haller thrived in New York City, where she later met and married Murray Roman. Together they founded the Campaign Communications Institute of America, a communications and research company specializing in political campaigns. They brought telemarketing to politics, and integrated its outreach to the Fortune 100 companies.

In 1968 Murray and Eva Roman set off to volunteer with UNICEF in Southeast Asia for close to a year. The couple returned to the United States with a renewed commitment to social issues. She and her husband re-opened their business, which became one of the first to advocate for women’s rights. With help from the proceeds of their successful business, they continued the pursuit of their philanthropy.

=== Yoel Haller ===
Three years after Murray Roman’s death in 1984, Eva met Yoel Haller, MD, an OBGYN who shared her dedication for social innovation and activism. Dr. Haller, a San Francisco-based OB/GYN, was the Medical Director of Planned Parenthood. He was also a clinical professor of Obstetrics and Gynecology in the University of California, San Francisco Medical School. They married in 1987. Dr. Haller died on November 3, 2025.

== Work ==
Haller on May 3, 2013

As of 2022, Haller served on the Boards of Directors for multiple non-profits, many of which she helped start, including:

- The New School for Social Research, Board of Governors
- University of California at Santa Barbara, Trustee
- The News Literacy Project, Board of Directors
- Sing For Hope, Board of Directors
- Asia Initiatives, Board of Directors
- The Sunny Center, Board of Directors
- Georgetown University, World Faith Development Dialogue Board of Directors
- The Prince's Charities, Board of Directors
- My Hero, Board of Directors
- Video Volunteers, Board of Directors
- Rubin Museum, Board of Directors
- Creative Visions Foundation, Board of Directors
- Glasgow Caledonian University New York, Board of Directors

=== Eva Haller Salon Series ===
At the beginning of the COVID-19 pandemic, Haller launched a "Salon" over the videoconferencing platform Zoom, inviting guests to present their topics of knowledge in front of a select group of audience members, followed by a Q&A. As of June 2022, Haller's "Zoom Salon" has aired over 120 salon episodes with different presenters, including:

- Jerry White, a Nobel Peace Prize-winner
- Prince Charles The Prince's Trust Board of Directors
- Elizabeth Dowdeswell, 29th Lieutenant Governor of Ontario
- Dread Scott, American visual artist
- Peter Sagal, Host of NPR's Wait Wait... Don't Tell Me!
- Joyce DiDonato, Grammy Award-winning mezzo-soprano opera singer
- William C. Potter, a Nonproliferation expert
- Ibrahim AlHusseini, venture capitalist
- Alan Miller, a Pulitzer Prize-winning journalist and Founder of The News Literacy Project

== Academia ==
Haller serves on the Board of Trustees at University of California, Santa Barbara, the Board of Governors at The New School for Social Research, as a Visiting Professor and on The Board of Glasgow Caledonian University's New York Campus, and the Board of The Berkley Center at Georgetown University.

== Recognition and awards ==
- 2006 - Selected as one of the “21 Leaders of the 21st Century”
- 2011- Recipient of the Mandela Award for Humanitarian Achievement, Rubin Museum of Art
- 2013 - Named Honorary Professor at Glasgow Caledonian University
- 2013 - Lifetime Achievement Award, United Nations Population Fund
- 2013 - Inaugural Mentoring Award, Forbes Women’s Summit
- 2014 - Awarded the Magnusson Fellowship at Glasgow Caledonian University
- 2014 - Awarded an Honorary Doctorate from Glasgow Caledonian University
- 2014 - Named Visiting Professor at Glasgow Caledonian University
- 2015 - Appointed to Prince’s Charities Canada Advisory Council
- 2015 - Awarded Luminary Status at the World Summit of Innovation and Entrepreneurship
- 2016 - Recognized as one of Impactmania's "101 Women of Impact"
- 2016 - MyHero Women Transforming Media Award
- 2017 - Inaugural Ban Ki-moon Mentorship Award

== Bibliography ==
- Free the Children (1998)
- Sex, Time, and Power: How Women's Sexuality Shaped Human Evolution (2004)
- Do Your Giving While You Are Living (2008)
