= Mother Grundy =

Mother Grundy is an etiological myth referring to a mountain, the "Madre Grande". The myth refers to a woman who is literally "as old as the hills" who came from this mountain, clinging to the "old ways" when the original inhabitants of Mexico and California lived around the area of the mountain. These old ways became erroneously associated with grundyism, giving rise to the eponym.

== See also ==
- Mrs Grundy
