= Red tape =

Idiom for excessively bureaucratic procedures or regulations

Red tape is excessive or redundant regulation or bureaucratic procedures that create financial or time compliance costs. It is usually associated with governments, but can apply to other organizations, such as private corporations.

Red tape differs from beneficial rules and safeguards. It is the administrative burden, or cost to the public, over and above the necessary cost of implementing policies and procedures. A distinction is sometimes made between rules that are dysfunctional from inception ("rules born bad"), and rules that initially served a useful function but evolved into red tape ("good rules gone bad").

Red tape can hamper the ability of firms to compete, grow, and create jobs. Research finds red tape has a cost to public sector workers, and can reduce employee well-being and job satisfaction. In 2005, the UK's Better Regulation Task Force suggested that red tape reforms could lead to an increase in GDP of 16 billion pounds per year, a greater than 1% rise. The Canadian Federation of Independent Business estimated the cost to business of red tape arising from federal, provincial and municipal government regulations was $11 billion in 2020, or about 28% of the total burden of regulation for businesses in Canada.

Many governments have introduced measures to limit or cut red tape, including the European Union, Argentina, the United States, and India. Experience from British Columbia, Canada, suggests a successful red tape reduction initiative requires strong political commitment.

== Definition ==
The term "red tape" is sometimes employed as "an umbrella term covering almost all imagined ills of bureaucracy", both public and private. However, red tape is usually defined more narrowly as government policies, guidelines, and forms that are excessive, duplicative or unnecessary, and that generate a financial or time-based compliance cost. Red tape can be categorized as dysfunctional from inception (say because of inadequate comprehension of the problem being addressed); or may evolve into red tape when a rule is inadvertently changed or is no longer needed (for example, a rule that requires carbon copies when communication migrates to electronic mail).

Whereas red tape refers to unnecessary rules, administrative burden (sometimes called "white tape") recognizes that regulations that are intended for useful purposes may nonetheless entail a compliance cost.

Determining whether a regulation is justified rather than red tape can be difficult. Nevertheless, making the proper distinction is relevant when implementing reforms, and cutting red tape differs from deregulation.

== Origins and history ==
It is generally believed that the term "red tape" originated in the early 16th century with the Spanish administration of Charles V, King of Spain and Holy Roman Emperor, who started to use red tape, balduque, in an effort to modernize the administration that was running his vast empire. The red tape was used to bind the most important administrative dossiers that required immediate discussion by the Council of State, and separate them from files that were treated in an ordinary administrative way, which were bound with ordinary string. The origin of the word balduque is the name of the Dutch city 's-Hertogenbosch Bolduque or Bois-le-Duc ("the duke's forrest"), where in those days the red tape was manufactured.

In Britain, Charles Dickens spoke of red tape in David Copperfield (1850): "Britannia, that unfortunate female, is always before me, like a trussed fowl: skewered through and through with office-pens, and bound hand and foot with red tape." The English practice of binding documents and official papers with red tape was popularized in Thomas Carlyle's writings, protesting against official inertia with expressions like "Little other than a red tape Talking-machine, and unhappy Bag of Parliamentary Eloquence". As of the first decade of the 21st century, the British barristers' briefs continued to be bound with pink-coloured ribbon known as red tape.

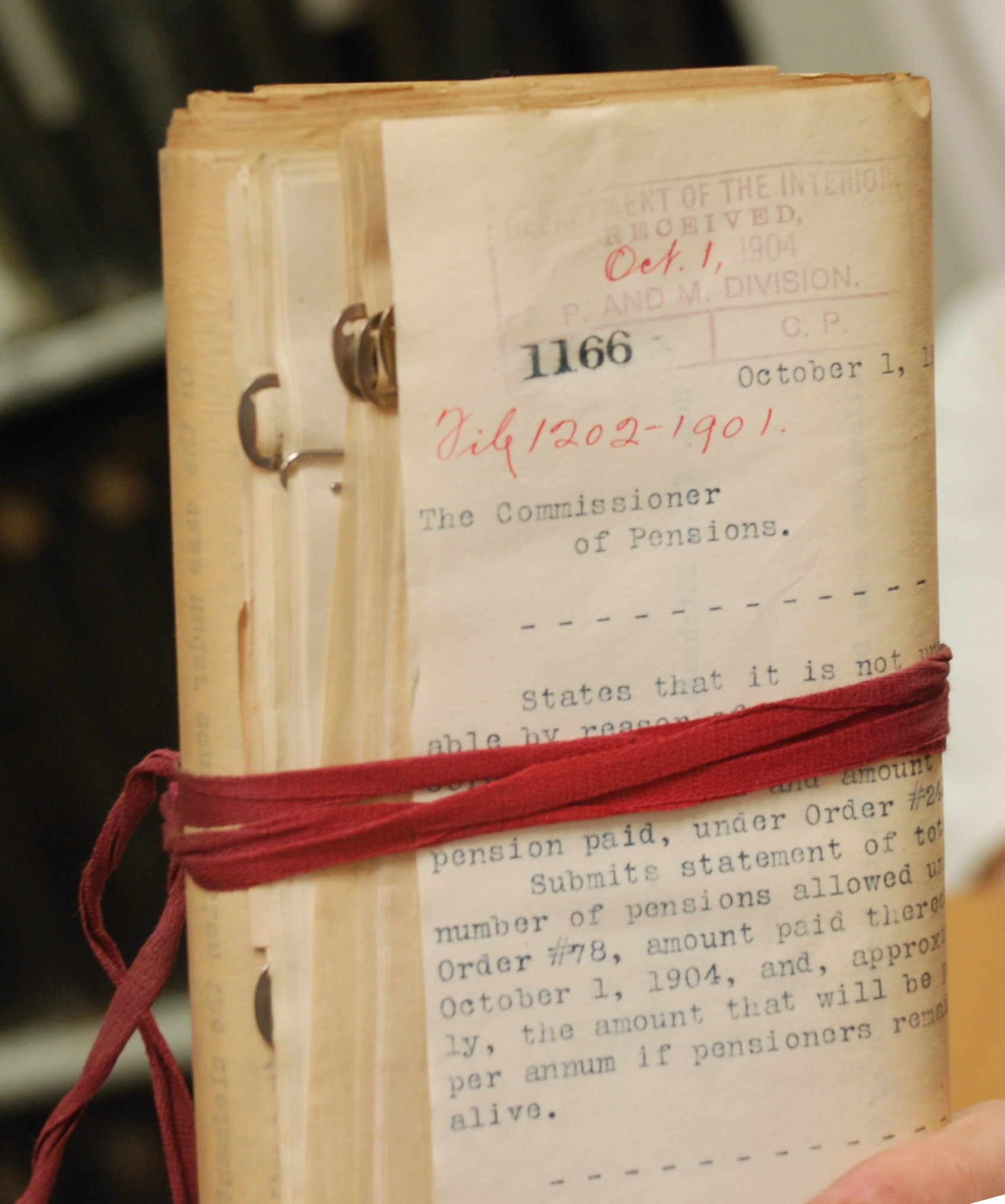
Bundle of US pension documents from 1906 bound in red tape

In the United States, red tape was used to tie personal records of Civil War veterans, reputedly making access to them inconvenient. Early references to red tape in the U.S. include Burke Hinsdale's 1881 memorial to President James A. Garfield where Hinsdale wrote of Garfield's time as principal of Hiram College "He had nothing of the regulation schoolmaster about him and he put red tape to small use"; and that of President Warren G. Harding's Secretary of the Interior Albert B. Fall (later convicted for his role in the Teapot Dome scandal) who, according to his own annual report for 1921, set himself the goal of removing "red tape and technicalities" from the management of the department's economic resources to combat stagnation. Similarly, the task handed to Scott C. Bone on his appointment as Governor of Alaska on 23 June 1921 was to "unravel government red tape". In 1921, the official explanation for the 3rd U.S. Infantry Regiment's strenuous march of 800 miles from Camp Sherman, Ohio to Fort Snelling was given as "red tape". While the army reportedly had insufficient funds to transport the regiment by rail, the cost to supply the troops on the march exceeded what their train fare might have been.

Red tape has historically often been associated with military procurement. In 1938, the IG Farben chairman Carl Krauch used the argument that red tape was responsible for previous delivery delays on the part of private enterprise in persuading Hermann Göring, the head of the Four Year Plan, to appoint him as plenipotentiary for the chemical industry over an Army Ordnance representative. In his speech at the meeting of SS Major-Generals in occupied Poznań on 4 October 1943, the SS leader Heinrich Himmler made reference to "red tape" as an example of a potential obstacle to "inventions" within Nazi Germany's armaments industry. In 1947, a contractor who had worked during World War II under Vannevar Bush in the Office of Scientific Research and Development remembered Bush's "impatience with Army red tape", apparently referring to the OSRD's executive secretary Irvin Stewart's organisational efforts.

As of the early 21st century, Spanish bureaucracy continued to be notorious for extreme levels of red tape (in the figurative sense). In 2013, the World Bank ranked Spain 136 out of 185 countries for ease of starting a business, which took on average 10 procedures and 28 days. Similar issues persist throughout Latin America. In Mexico in 2009, it took six months and a dozen visits to government agencies to obtain a permit to paint a house. To obtain a monthly prescription for gamma globulin for X-linked agammaglobulinemia, a patient had to obtain signatures from two government doctors and stamps from four separate bureaucrats before presenting the prescription to a dispensary. Mexico was the original home of Syntex, one of the greatest pharmaceutical firms of the 20th century, but in 1959, the company left for the American city of Palo Alto, California, in what is now Silicon Valley, because its scientists were fed up with the Mexican government's bureaucratic delays which repeatedly impeded their research.

== Cost ==
It is impossible to know exactly how much of the burden of government regulations is red tape – i.e., is excessive and delivers little or no benefit. However, a survey by the Canadian Federation of Independent Business (CFIB) found red tape represented about 28% of the total burden of regulation in Canada in 2020. A European Union (EU) survey reported in 2008 that 36% of EU small and medium enterprises felt that red tape had "constrained their business activities".

The total cost of regulation for U.S. business was estimated in 2021 at US$364.3 billion, and for Canadian business in 2020 at US$31.9 billion, or CAN$38.8 billion. This cost represents 1.5% of GDP for the U.S. and 1.7% for Canada.

The CFIB estimated that the cost of red tape arising from Canadian federal, provincial and municipal government regulations was $11 billion in 2020. (This excluded COVID-19 related costs, to make the amount more comparable to previous years.) The annual cost of red tape per employee was higher for firms with fewer than 5 employees, at $1945, versus $398 for firms with 100 or more employees.

The Better Regulation Task Force suggested in 2005 that red tape reforms could potentially deliver an increase in income of 16 billion pounds per year, an amount greater than one percent of UK GDP. The EU's "Cutting Red Tape in Europe" report, which presented suggestions on how to reduce the administrative burden when member states implement EU legislation, estimated that the administrative burden reduction potential of all recommendations in the report exceeded €41 billion annually. Such calculations have been questioned, however, given that it can be difficult to ascertain costs of regulation in industries that are composed of diverse firms.

While a regulation may be useful, the cost of imposing it may exceed the benefits. The Canadian federal government applies a cost-benefit analysis to most regulatory proposals, which takes into account the cost of the policy to consumers, businesses, and other sectors of society. Since the 1970s, Australian governments have sought to subject regulation to rigorous cost-benefit analysis so as to constrain both the stock and flow of the regulatory burden.

== Reduction initiatives ==
It can be difficult to distinguish between justified regulatory costs and unneeded regulations. For this reason, the expression "cutting red tape" has been used to refer to both initiatives to reduce unnecessary regulation, and to policies to reduce the overall regulatory burden.

=== Canada ===
Canada's Red Tape Reduction Act of 2015 implemented a one-for-one rule that requires the removal of a regulation each time regulators impose a new administrative burden on business. Nevertheless, while Regulations decreased from 684 to 605 between 2014 and 2023, regulatory Requirements increased from 129,860 to 149,401.

A more successful reduction in red tape took place in the province of British Columbia, Canada, following a 2001 election promise to reduce the regulatory burden by 33%. At the time, regulation was heavy, with rules imposed on, for example, the size of televisions in restaurants, the number of par-four holes at golf courses, and the maximum seating capacity of ski hill lounges. After three years, a 37% reduction was achieved. A central element of the program was a strong commitment from the minister responsible and the provincial premier.

=== European Union ===
In the European Union (EU), reducing the administrative burden on firms has been a prominent theme since the 1990s. In 2024, the European Commission President advocated a red tape reduction program that emphasized simplification (eliminating regulatory overlap and contradictions), speed, and coherence to deal with the EU's patchwork of national regulations. An ongoing EU objective has been to remove red tape in order to facilitate trade across the European single market. For example, recycling labels on paint cans in Spain and France may differ because the two countries' interpretation of EU legislation are not aligned, and this prevents a can of paint made for the Spanish market from being sold in France. The European Round Table for Industry recommends stronger single-market enforcement so that lawmakers better transpose EU laws into national laws, which would promote regulatory harmonization and reduce the need for firms to manage different administrative processes in each EU country.

=== India ===
India's experience with red tape has roots in the licencing and permit system that operated from the 1950s to the early 1990s, known as the Licence Raj. India's licence raj often led to absurd restrictions by its labyrinthine bureaucracy, up to 80 agencies had to be satisfied before a firm could be granted a licence to produce. Then, the state decided what was produced, how much, at what price, and what sources of capital were used. It was also illegal to lay off over 100 workers without permission from the government under the Industrial Disputes Act, 1947. While the intricate licencing system at the central level was done dismantled in 1991 following a balance-of-payment crisis, a significant number of regulations continues to impede businesses in India. Under India's Industrial Relations Code, 2020, it is still unlawful for firms employing over 300 workers to lay anyone off without prior approval from the government.

To reduce red tape, in September 2021 the Indian government launched the National Single Window System (NSWS) which integrates clearances across central ministries and states. In addition to providing a common entry point, NSWS consolidates information requirements and aims to standardise application formats, support online tracking, and enable time-bound processing. The Jan Vishwas (Amendment of Provisions) Act, 2023, is meant to reduce procedural delays by decriminalising minor, technical provisions and allow adjudication rather than prosecution. To minimize discretionary variation in routine cases, a “faceless” (electronic communication) assessment, appeal, and penalty process was introduced in tax laws. However, the impact of these reforms is contested.

=== Korea ===
South Korea's Framework Act on Administrative Regulations codifies the definition, registration and publication of regulations; mandates regulatory impact analysis; provides for a presidential Regulatory Reform Committee; and requires sunset or re-examination clauses for new or strengthened regulations. On 15 September 2025 the first Core Regulation Rationalization Strategy Meeting was chaired by Korean President Lee Jae-myung, who stated: "Amid complex interests, ministerial differences have left regulations tangled like a spiderweb; sweeping them away is this administration’s goal."

Among the major initiatives is the online Regulatory Reform "Sinmungo" (request system) launched in 2014, which routes public and business complaints for ministerial review in an effort to reduce redundant paperwork and processing time. In 2015 the program Transfer Notification Plus replaced multiple provider-specific applications with a single authentication and consent procedure, thereby reducing visits, duplicate documentation, mis-entries, and missed applications. Similarly, in 2019 a cross-government regulatory sandbox was introduced to reduce pre-market uncertainty for new technologies. For example, autonomous delivery robots received a bundled approval for sidewalk operation in designated zones. Also in 2019, a Presidential Decree on Proactive Administration was adopted to curb procedural overload and to break the chain: interpretive uncertainty → extra documents → delay.

=== New Zealand ===
In March 2023, New Zealand established a Ministry for Regulation, which promotes a culture where "regulation is a last resort." The Regulatory Standards Bill introduced in 2024 aims to codify principles of good regulatory practice and "bring the same level of discipline to regulation that the Public Finance Act brings to public spending, with the Ministry for Regulation playing a role akin to that of Treasury." One of the Ministry's key initiatives was to build a red tape "tipline" which is used to prioritize reviews and recommend legislative changes. Among the Ministry's "horror stories" was a proposal to reduce the size of flour dust in commercial bakeries to such a low level that it couldn't be reliably measured or distinguished from other particles, making compliance effectively impossible.

=== United States ===
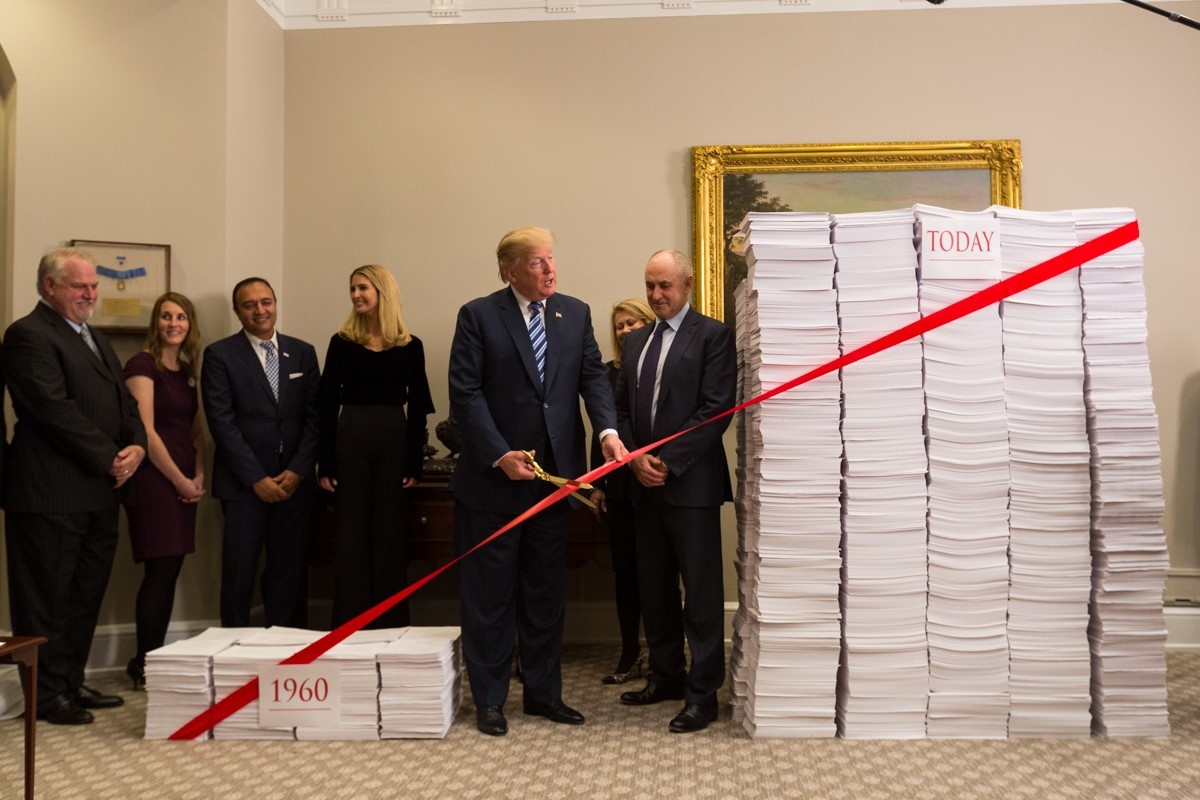
President Donald J. Trump prepares to cut a "red tape" display of regulations representative of 1960 and compared to the current numbers of regulations, December 14, 2017, in the Roosevelt Room at the White House, announcing how the administration is keeping its promise to remove regulations burdening job creators and American taxpayers.

In the United States, cutting red tape was a central principle of a 1993 National Performance Review study requested by the Clinton Administration. In November 2024, U.S. President-elect Donald Trump said Elon Musk and Vivek Ramaswamy would co-lead a new Department of Government Efficiency which would provide advice from outside government on methods to "slash excess regulations", among other objectives.

== Perceptions ==
Applying rules consistently can affect the extent to which individuals perceive that red tape exists in a government agency. A survey-based experiment in the context of a jury duty summons found inconsistently applied rules may be viewed as ineffective or unfair, fueling the perception of a high level of red tape.

Perception of red tape (as opposed to useful regulation) may be relevant in the public service context, since employees may be more willing to comply with rules that they perceive as valuable.

== Impact on public sector employees ==
=== Employee performance ===
India's Hota Committee Report noted "file-pushing", in the form of extensive procedures and layered rules, slowed civil service decision-making, even for routine administrative actions. A 2025 survey of 73,795 Korean government officials found 48.11% of respondents agreed that inefficiencies were created by unnecessary documents and reports, and 22.06% said eliminating "formalism and other pseudo-work" was the most urgent priority to reduce inefficiency. Red tape led to unclear direction on rules, policies, and guidelines and, thereby, to poor internal client service, according to the Blueprint 2020 report that surveyed over 2,000 Canadian public servants.

A study that used interviews with 22 New Zealand public sector managers found red tape, in the form of irrelevant goals without real benchmarks, made giving performance feedback difficult. In turn, this made it difficult to address poor employee performance. Further, managers were less encouraged to develop their employees' skills.

=== Employee autonomy ===
Red tape can reduce employee flexibility and autonomy. A study of Dutch child welfare employees showed that red tape reduced interactions with clients and job effectiveness, which decreased job satisfaction. Highly motivated employees were found to be more sensitive to burdensome rules and procedures.

Evidence from the civil service in India finds ambiguity in interpreting overlapping rules may incentivise risk-averse behaviour and crowd-out professional judgement. Further, this can dampen morale.

=== Employee job satisfaction ===
The more employees perceive red tape (formalistic procedural burdens), the significantly lower is their job satisfaction according to a Korean police organization survey study from 2016 (n=294). Similarly, the greater is the red tape perceived by civil servants, the higher is their intent to leave their current employer, as stated in a study that used data from the Korea Institute of Public Administration's 2019 Public Service Life Survey.

A 2022 study that used survey data from 354 schools in Chile found school principals experienced increased emotional exhaustion and risk of burnout when they were advised of an increase in red tape in the form of unneeded compliance tasks. Similarly, research conducted into experiences of public-school leaders and teachers in Belgium observed that when employees were faced with a higher level of red tape (associated with the use of new digital tools), they were more likely to experience emotional exhaustion and, consequently, have a greater intention to leave their organization.

== Economic growth and corruption ==
=== Economic growth ===
While efficient government institutions can foster economic growth, cumbersome and unnecessary bureaucracy that delays permits and licenses slows technological advances. Red tape has been found to be an obstacle to investment and growth in a study using data for 68 countries.

Policies that require government regulation and bureaucratic intervention can stifle economic progress, as has been documented by economist Anne Krueger in the context of an import-substitution development strategy. This type of policy reduces the incentive to produce exports, thereby generating a foreign exchange "shortage" that puts pressure on governments to restrict imports to high priority areas such as medicines over consumer luxuries. These restrictions require increased intervention, such as additional customs inspections and import approvals. In turn, this leads to delays and greater complexity of the system, which raises costs for importers. The higher costs create an incentive for black-market activity, thereby leading to political pressure to tighten still further the restrictive import regime. Over time, regulation and red tape promote more red tape and regulation in a vicious circle, as supporters of import substitution become more entrenched, while those who oppose it, such as exporters, cannot survive in the new environment. Rising costs of administration in the private sector, along with costs of delays and market inefficiency, weigh on economic performance and often result in an economic crisis.

=== Corruption ===
The existence of regulations and authorizations provides a kind of monopoly power to the officials who must approve or inspect regulated activities. When regulations are not transparent, or an authorization can be obtained only from a specific office or individual (that is, there is no competition in the granting of these authorizations), bureaucrats have a great deal of power which may lead to corruption.

Officials may even intentionally introduce new regulations and red tape in order to be able to extract more bribes by threatening to deny permits. Particularly in developing and transition economies, surveys indicate that a large proportion of an enterprise manager's time (especially for small enterprises) requires dealing with bureaucracies, and this time can be reduced through the payment of bribes.

== See also ==
- Busy work
- Byzantinism
- Crony capitalism
- Cronyism
- Gestor
- Humphrey Appleby
- Instruction creep
- Jobsworth
- License Raj
- Micromanagement
- Paperwork Reduction Act
- Paternalism
- Prig
- Purple crocodile
- Regulatory impact analysis
- Sludge theory
