= Mark Kaplan (musician) =

American violinist (born 1953)

Mark Kaplan (born 30 December 1953, in Cambridge, Massachusetts) is an American violinist, currently a professor at Indiana University's Jacobs School of Music. Before teaching at Indiana, Kaplan taught at the University of California, Los Angeles (UCLA).

== Biography ==
Kaplan studied at the Juilliard School under Dorothy DeLay.

He taught at UCLA, before taking up a his post as professor of violin at Jacobs School of Music in 2005.

Kaplan has performed with most of the major orchestras in the United States, including New York Philharmonic, Los Angeles Philharmonic, Cleveland Orchestra, Philadelphia Orchestra, the National Symphony Orchestra of Washington, D.C., as well as St Louis Symphony Orchestra, Pittsburgh Symphony Orchestra, Baltimore Symphony Orchestra, Minnesota Orchestra, Cincinnati Symphony Orchestra, Dallas Symphony Orchestra, and Houston Symphony.

He has also performed widely in international settings, since his European debut in 1975 when he was asked to substitute for Pinchas Zuckerman, playing the Bartók Concerto in Cologne under the baton of Lawrence Foster. He has since made concerto and recital appearances in London, Berlin, Paris, Vienna, Prague, Zurich, Amsterdam, Copenhagen and Milan, as well as in Australia, New Zealand, Malaysia, Hong Kong and Singapore. In Australia, Kaplan appeared for the Australian Broadcasting Corporation, playing with the Queensland Orchestra in Brisbane in 2009.

In addition to his solo work, Kaplan records and performs with pianist Yael Weiss and cellist Peter Stumpf as the Weiss-Kaplan-Stumpf Trio. He previously performed and recorded for two decades in the Golub-Kaplan-Carr trio, with cellist Colin Carr and pianist David Golub.

== Works ==
Kaplan's second recording of the solo violin works of JS Bach was issued in early 2016 on Bridge Records, alongside a Weiss-Kaplan-Stumpf Trio recording of Fred Lerdahl’s "Times 3". In 2014 was released (also for Bridge) of a CD with new American Piano Trios, joining a 2011 recording of Brahms and Smetana Trios. Other recent recordings include concerti of Berg and Stravinsky, the Lalo Symphonie Espagnole and the Concierto Espagnol of Joan Manen, all under the baton of Lawrence Foster, as well as Lewis Spratlan’s Concertino and the tone poem, Le Ménétrier, by Max d’Ollone. Kaplan's discography also includes the Bartók Violin Concerto No. 2 and Dohnanyi Violin Concerto No. 2, violin concerti of Paganini, Wieniawski and Viotti; the Brahms Double Concerto; Spanish Dances of Sarasate; various works of Bartók including the Solo Sonata; violin and piano sonatas of Schumann with Anton Kuerti; and trios of Brahms, Debussy, Dvorak, Fauré, Mendelssohn, Rachmaninov, Saint-Saëns, Schubert, Smetana and Tchaikowsky. The Golub-Kaplan-Carr Trio's recording, on Arabesque Records, of Tchaikovsky and Smetana trios, received an INDIE Award for Best Classical Album by an Ensemble.

== Personal life ==
Kaplan plays a violin made by Antonio Stradivari in 1685, named "The Marquis" after the Marchese Spinola, whose family owned the violin for several generations. Both of his sons are also musicians: Edwin Kaplan is a member of the Tesla Quartet, and David Kaplan is a piano soloist and faculty member at UCLA.
