= David Golub =

American pianist and conductor

David Golub (March 22, 1950 – October 16, 2000) was an American pianist and conductor.

== Biography ==
Born in Chicago, Golub moved with his family to Richardson, Texas when he was five years old. He began piano lessons not long thereafter when his father, himself an amateur musician, noticed the boy attempting to play Beethoven’s Moonlight Sonata by ear. Following study with Dallas teachers Betty Lief Sims and Alexander Uninsky, Golub entered the Juilliard School, where he studied with Beveridge Webster, at age 18; parental concerns had prevented his acceptance of a scholarship offered four years earlier.

Golub soon began what would be a series of well-respected chamber music partnerships by teaming with cellist Leonard Rose. Rose, in turn, introduced Golub to violinist Isaac Stern; in 1979, the two received considerable international attention as the first major Western musicians to undertake an extended recital tour of China after the Cultural Revolution. The resultant film, From Mao to Mozart, won the Academy Award for best full-length documentary in 1981. Not long thereafter, Golub, violinist Mark Kaplan, and cellist Colin Carr formed the Golub-Kaplan-Carr Trio, a well-respected and extensively-recorded chamber group, which won the AFIM Indie award for best classical ensemble in 1995 in honor of its recording of Smetana and Tchaikowsky piano trios on the Arabesque label. Golub was also a member of the Chamber Music Society of Lincoln Center.

Golub’s accomplishments as a chamber musician did not exclude a distinguished career as a soloist. Of particular note was his recording of Gershwin’s Concerto in F and Rhapsody in Blue with the London Symphony Orchestra, also on Arabesque, which Time magazine honored as one of the ten best records of 1988.

Toward the end of his life, Golub turned increasingly to the conductor’s podium. Among the organizations for which he served in that capacity were the Padua Chamber Orchestra, with which he toured the United States in 1999. He also worked with the Hong Kong Philharmonic. He also conducted opera—both on records and at the Festival della Valle d'Itria in Martina Franca, Italy—displaying particular interest in reviving works outside the standard repertory. With the Padua Chamber Orchestra he recorded the Joseph Haydn operas La Fedeltà Premiata (1999) and L'Isola disabitata(1998). He died of lung cancer in Milan, Italy, aged 50.
