= Jobsworth =

Rule-bound, inflexible official

A jobsworth is a person who uses the (typically small) authority of their job in a deliberately uncooperative way, or who seemingly delights in acting in an obstructive or unhelpful manner, which may involve upholding petty rules at the expense of efficiency or effectiveness. Related concepts include micromanagement, malicious compliance and passive-aggressive behaviour, which can impair progress with focus on minute details and excess control over those a person works with.

== Origin ==
"Jobsworth" is a British colloquialism derived from the notion that something being asked of one in a work environment is too great to risk their job over, as in "I can't do that; it's more than my job's worth."

The Oxford English Dictionary defines it as "A person in authority (esp. a minor official) who insists on adhering to rules and regulations or bureaucratic procedures even at the expense of common sense." Jonathon Green similarly defines "jobsworth" as "a minor factotum whose only status comes from enforcing otherwise petty regulations". It is a form of passive aggressive obstructionism, using the letter of the law as a weapon to impair progress or prevent change.

== Examples ==
An example of the phrase in its original context can be found in the 1965 Beatles movie Help!, when Roy Kinnear's character, the assistant scientist Algernon, exclaims: "Well it's more than my job's worth to stop him when he's like this; he's out to rule the world ... if he can get a government grant."

An example of the term in its fully formed metaphorical use was by UK folk-singer Jeremy Taylor in a song he wrote in the late 1960s:

Jobsworth, Jobsworth, It's more than me job's worth,
I don't care, rain or snow,
whatever you want the answer's no,
I can keep you waiting for hours in the queue,
and if you don't like it you know what you can do.

== Usage ==
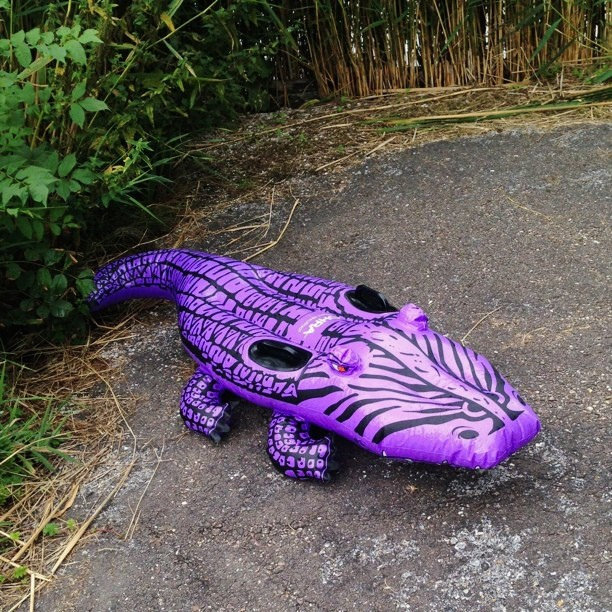
A purple crocodile is now a metaphor for unhelpful officialdom in the Netherlands

The term became widespread in vernacular English through its use in the popular 1970s BBC television programme That's Life!, which featured Esther Rantzen covering various human interest and consumer topics. A "Jobsworth of the Week" commissionaire's hat was awarded each week to "a startling tale of going by the book".

The term is in use, particularly in the UK, to characterise inflexible employees, petty rule-following and excessive administration, and is generally used in a pejorative context.

The slang expression "Little Hitler" is also used with a similar meaning.

== See also ==
- Apparatchik
- Red tape
- Work-to-rule
