= Fuddy-duddy =

Person who is fussy while old-fashioned, traditionalist, conformist, or conservative

"Fuddy-duddy" (or "fuddy duddy" or "fuddy-dud") is a term for a person who is fussy while old-fashioned, traditionalist, conformist or conservative, sometimes almost to the point of eccentricity or geekiness. It is a slang term, mildly derogatory but sometimes affectionate too and can be used to describe someone with a zealous focus on order.

== Etymology ==
"Fuddy-duddy" is considered a word based on duplication and may have originated as a fused phrase made to form a rhyming jingle. Duddy is similar to Daddy and may have caught on from children's rhyming.

Douglas Harper of the Online Etymology Dictionary reports it from "1871, American English, of uncertain origin." However, Dictionary.com Unabridged compares it to a Northern English dialectal term: "1900-05; of obscure origin; compare dial. (Cumberland) duddy-fuddiel a ragged fellow."

Gary Martin states: "William Dickinson's A glossary of words and phrases pertaining to the dialect of Cumberland, 1899, has:

"Duddy fuddiel, a ragged fellow""

and "in 1833, the Scots poet James Ballantyne wrote The Wee Raggit Laddie:

Wee stuffy, stumpy, dumpie laddie,
Thou urchin elfin, bare an' duddy,
Thy plumpit kite an' cheek sae ruddy,
Are fairly baggit,
Although the breekums on thy fuddy,
Are e'en right raggit."

== Application ==
"Fuddy-duddy" is used to indicate "stuffiness" and "outmoded tastes and manners". For example, the Bentley car manufacturer was referred to as a "fuddy-duddy" brand in a 2004 Popular Science article.

Ambrose Bierce's story Who Drives Oxen Should Himself be Sane, published in 1918, starts out with a use of the word and discussion of it as a "unique adjuration". The term is also used in the title of juvenile fiction including Kay Hoflander's The Chautauqua Kids and the Fuddy Duddy Daddy: A Tale of Pancakes & Baseball, and the Uncle Fuddy-Duddy series by Roy Windham and Polly Rushton.

In its shortened form, "fudd" or "gun fudd" is often used as a disparaging term to refer to a gun owner who only supports gun ownership for sport and hunting purposes, and is opposed to the ownership of modern assault-style firearms and accessories, whether for offensive or defensive purposes. This use originates from the cartoon character Elmer Fudd, in reference to his old-fashioned hunting outfit and double-barrel shotgun, gullibility, shortness of both stature and temper, and general incompetence in hunting his archenemy, Bugs Bunny.

== Gender ==
"Fuddy-duddy" is gender neutral, often used to refer to a person perceived as stodgy or foolish.

It has been used throughout the 20th century, but its origins are unknown. The short form "fud" may relate to the Bugs Bunny cartoon character Elmer Fudd. The terms frump and old fart have also been used as words to designate similar qualities.

Female figures have been labelled with terms of a similar meaning, including "school marm" or "marm", which could be used for an older female disciplinarian such as a stereotypical type of strict teacher.

== Regional lingo ==
"Fuddy-duddy" was often used as a verb by a native of the state of Maine in the sense of 'to act in a foolish or ineffectual manner'.

== See also ==
- Fuddle duddle
- Prude
- Prig
