= David Kaplan (pianist) =

American pianist (born 1983)

David Kaplan (born 1983) is an American piano soloist and chamber musician. He is currently on the faculty at the UCLA Herb Alpert School of Music.

== Biography ==
Born in New York City to musical parents in 1983, David Kaplan is the son of violinist and pedagogue Mark Kaplan. Following his undergraduate studies at UCLA, he attended Yale School of Music where he studied under Claude Frank. Kaplan is also a Fulbright Scholar, and studied conducting with Lutz Köhler at the Universität der Künste in Berlin.

Music critic Anthony Tommasini met him when he came upon him by chance one summer evening in 2011, playing Robert Schumann’s Carnaval on the piano on an impromptu basis that was left outside of Alice Tully Hall as part of the Sing for Hope Pianos Project.

Kaplan is a core member of Decoda, the first ever Affiliate Ensemble of Carnegie Hall, a chamber ensemble.

An advocate of contemporary music, "Kaplan’s passion for drawing connections between past and present music has resulted in New Dances of the League of David, a suite that incorporates newly commissioned miniatures into Schumann’s Davidsbündlertänze, Op. 6, including such eminent composers as Augusta Read Thomas, Han Lash, Gabriel Kahane, and Andrew Norman."

Kaplan is a Yamaha Artist.

== Discography ==
- No Orpheus the Songs of Mohammed Fairouz with soprano Kiera Duffy (2016) Naxos.
- Shy and Mighty (2010) Timo Andres & David Kaplan, Nonesuch Records.
