= Mrs Grundy =

Term for an extremely prudish person

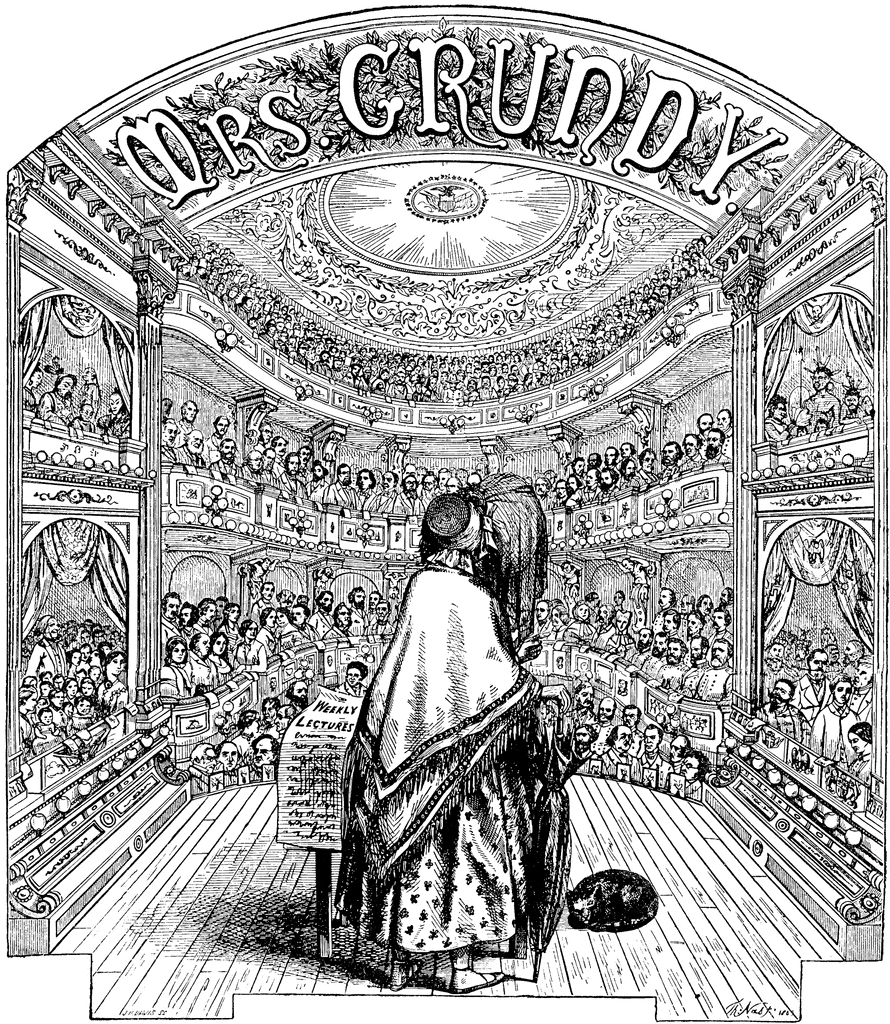
Mrs Grundy, as imagined by an anonymous draftsperson

Mrs Grundy is a figurative name for an extremely conventional or priggish person, a personification of the tyranny of conventional propriety. A tendency to be overly fearful of what others might think is sometimes referred to as grundyism.

Mrs Grundy originated as an unseen character in Thomas Morton's 1798 five-act comedy Speed the Plough. The figure of Mrs Grundy became well established in culture: as early as 1813 The Examiner referenced her (with a specific nod to Speed the Plough), and in Samuel Butler's 1872 novel Erewhon, the goddess Ydgrun (her name an anagram of "Grundy"), dictates social norms. References to "Mrs Grundy" as a personification of propriety, as well as to "Grundyism", "Grundyists" and "Grundyites", can be found throughout the English-speaking world and beyond.

== Original appearance ==
Curiously for so famous a character, Mrs Grundy never actually appears in the play which introduced her, but is the continual object of the boastful Dame Ashfield's envious watchfulness, as is shown in the very first scene:

Ashfield. Well, Dame, welcome whoam. What news does thee bring vrom market?
Dame. What news, husband? What I always told you; that Farmer Grundy's wheat brought five shillings a quarter more than ours did.
Ash. All the better vor he.
Dame. Ah! the sun seems to shine on purpose for him.
Ash. Come, come, missus, as thee hast not the grace to thank God for prosperous times, dan't thee grumble when they be unkindly a bit.
Dame. And I assure you, Dame Grundy's butter was quite the crack of the market.
Ash. Be quiet, woolye? aleways ding, dinging Dame Grundy into my ears — what will Mrs Grundy zay? What will Mrs Grundy think — Canst thee be quiet, let ur alone, and behave thyzel pratty?
Dame. Certainly I can — I'll tell thee, Tummas, what she said at church last Sunday.
Ash. Canst thee tell what parson zaid? Noa — Then I'll tell thee — A' zaid that envy were as foul a weed as grows, and cankers all wholesome plants that be near it — that's what a' zaid.
Dame. And do you think I envy Mrs Grundy indeed?

Although later usage positions her chiefly as a feared dispenser of disapproval, the Mrs Grundy of the play is, in Dame Ashfield's daydreams, not so much a figure of dread as a cowed audience to the accomplishments of the Ashfield family. As the play progresses, Dame Ashfield and her comical musings soon drop from sight to make way for melodrama.

== Victorian heyday ==
With the Victorian era, its new morality of decency, domesticity, serious-mindedness, propriety and community discipline on the one hand, its humbug, hypocrisy and self-deception on the other, Mrs Grundy swiftly rose to a position of censorious authority. In John Poole's 1841 novel Phineas Quiddy, Poole wrote "Many people take the entire world to be one huge Mrs. Grundy, and, upon every act and circumstance of their lives, please, or torment themselves, according to the nature of it, by thinking of what that huge Mrs. Grundy, the World, will say about it". In 1869, John Stuart Mill, himself very aware of the potentially tyrannical power of social opprobrium, referred to Mrs Grundy in The Subjection of Women, noting that "Whoever has a wife and children has given hostages to Mrs. Grundy".

Butler in his 1872 Erewhon noted of Ydgrun that "she was held to be both omnipresent and omnipotent; but she was not an elevated conception, and was sometimes both cruel and absurd". His own preference was for the small group he called High Ydgrunites, who broadly accepted the low-norm conventions of the goddess, but were capable of rising above Mrs Grundy and her claims, if need be.

With the fin de siècle erosion of the Victorian moral consensus, Mrs Grundy began to lose her power, and by the 1920s she was already little more than a faded laughing-stock, being mocked for example in the advice book for teens, Mrs Grundy is Dead (New York: Century, 1930). A later appearance as the whitehaired schoolteacher in Archie comics in 1941, however, has kept the name alive.

== Linguistic associations ==
While not strictly onomatopoeia, the name 'Grundy' nevertheless has sound associations with underlying mental dissatisfaction as evidenced linguistically in words such as 'grumble', 'mumble', 'grunt', and 'gruntled'.

Roget's Thesaurus places Grundyism under prudery, linked most closely to euphemism.

== Examples ==
- C. S. Lewis's character Mark Studdock in That Hideous Strength refers to her in a ghost-written article for an unnamed British periodical (which is intended to promote the interests of a group of Satanists). "If you hear anyone talking about the liberties of England (by which he means the liberties of the obscurantists, the Mrs. Grundies, the bishops, and the capitalists), watch that man. He's the enemy."
- Aldous Huxley refers to her in the essay "To the Puritan All Things Are Impure" in his book Music at Night.
- Walter de la Mare described her in his poem of that title: "High-coifed, broad-browed, aged, suave but grim, A large flat face, eyes keenly dim, staring at nothing ... on each of those chairs has gloated in righteousness".
- Aimée Crocker refers to her throughout her autobiography And I'd Do It Again.
- P. T. Barnum refers to her in the preface to his non-fiction booklet Art of Money Getting (1880).
- Oscar Wilde in a letter to the St. James Gazette describes her as "Mrs Grundy, that amusing old lady who represents the only original form of humour that the middle classes of this country have been able to produce" (1890).
- Charles Dickens mentions her in his novel Hard Times.
- William Makepeace Thackeray mentions her in his novel Vanity Fair.
- William Gilbert refers to her in the patter song "At the outset I may mention it's my sovereign intention" in the second act of The Grand Duke, and in the (cut) song "Though men of rank may useless seem" for the Duke in Patience (opera).
- George Gissing wrote a novel, Mrs Grundy's Enemies, which was never published and is now lost. In his novel Born in Exile he describes the guests at a garden party as “not one of them inclined to disregard the dictates of Mrs Grundy in dress, demeanour or dialogue.”
- G. K. Chesterton mentions her in chapter III of Orthodoxy and titled a chapter "The Humility of Mrs Grundy" in his book What's Wrong With the World.
- Lewis Carroll often refers to "Mrs Grundy" in his letters as a characterization of those who may disapprove of his friendships with children.
- James Joyce refers to her in the "Eumaeus" chapter of Ulysses. Gifford's Ulysses Annotated characterizes her as "the ultimate arbiter of stuffy middle-class propriety".
- Robert A. Heinlein also mentions her, for example, in his novels The Number of the Beast, To Sail Beyond the Sunset, Stranger in a Strange Land, and in the second intermission of Time Enough for Love. "Freedom begins when you tell Mrs. Grundy to go fly a kite."
- Philip José Farmer's characters in the Riverworld series also refer to Mrs Grundy as prudishness incarnate in a negative way.
- Peter Fryer's book Mrs Grundy: Studies in English Prudery concerns prudish behaviour, such as the use of euphemisms for underwear.
- Jack London uses Mrs Grundy in his books The People of the Abyss and The Sea-Wolf. In the former he describes the early twentieth century attitude of the English working class towards drunkenness: "Mrs Grundy rules as supremely over the workers as she does over the bourgeoisie; but in the case of the workers, the one thing she does not frown upon is the public house ... Mrs Grundy drew the line at spirits." In The Sea-Wolf, on the 1st page of chapter 10, the protagonist says of his race that it's, "...sober-minded, clean-lived, and fanatically moral and which in this latter connection has culminated among the English in the Reformed Church and Mrs. Grundy".
- Mohandas Gandhi refers to Mrs Grundy as an unsuitable reason to end his *brahmacharya* experiment.
- Louisa May Alcott alludes to Mrs Grundy in her book Little Women when speaking of the changes Laurie undergoes as a result of Amy's admonitions to him (1868).
- Anthony Trollope's character Lady Glencora in Can You Forgive Her? says, "Sometimes I wish there were no such things as looks. I don't mean anything improper, you know; only one does get so hampered, right and left, for fear of Mrs Grundy."
- Martin Seymour-Smith refers to Mrs Grundy throughout his biography of Thomas Hardy, noting the writer's struggles with what he called "an unexpected Grundian cloud… 'excessive prudery'".
- Thomas Hardy disparages the "Grundyist" in his essay "Candour in English Fiction" (1890).
- Walter Lippmann dismisses the "exploded pretensions of Mr and Mrs Grundy" in his A Preface to Politics (1913).
- On the British television show Absolutely Fabulous, the prudish Saffron is called a Mrs Grundy by Patsy, a hedonist.
- A long-time character in Archie Comics is the teacher Miss Grundy. When first introduced, she fit the Mrs Grundy archetype well, being judgmental and old-fashioned. However, the character has been softened considerably over the years, and her current incarnation is not particularly Grundyesque.
- P. G. Wodehouse's lyrics to the song "Till the Clouds Roll By" from the musical Oh Boy! contain the line "What would Missus Grundy say?" in Verse 1.
- H. G. Wells's character Ewart in the novel Tono-Bungay, during a long dialogue about the Grundys says, "There's no Mrs Grundy." (book 1 chapter 4, section iii)
- Vladimir Nabokov refers to Mrs Grundy in his novel The Real Life of Sebastian Knight (1941).
- Dossie Easton and Janet Hardy refer to "Mrs Grundy" in Chapter 12 of The Ethical Slut (2nd Edition, 2009).
- Harry Turtledove refer to "Mrs Grundy" in Chapter 3 of Colonization: Down to Earth.
- E. M. Forster - The Clever Lady says "If it is Mrs Grundy who is troubling you..." in Chapter 2 of A Room with a View, and "Grundyism" generally in Two Cheers for Democracy.
- Patrick O'Brian in Treason's Harbour describes Jack Aubrey's wife as "...completely different. She was not a prude, and she cared no more for Mrs Grundy than Diana..."
- Vesta Tilley's song "Bazaar Maids" refers to all the pretty, witty girls "under Mother Grundy's laws".
- John Galsworthy refers to an English family holidaying in Switzerland as "English Grundys" in his novel "The Dark Flower" (1913).
- Carrie Chapman Catt references Mother Grundy in her 1916 Presidential Address to NAWSA.

== See also ==
- Covering cherub
- Emily Post
- Mary Whitehouse
- Openness to experience
- Thomas Bowdler
- Typical intellectual engagement
