= Intellectual curiosity =

Curiosity leading to acquisition of knowledge

Intellectual curiosity (also called epistemic curiosity) is curiosity that leads to an acquisition of general knowledge. It can include curiosity about such things as what objects are composed of, the underlying mechanisms of systems, mathematical relationships, languages, social norms, and history. It can be differentiated from another type of curiosity that does not lead to the acquisition of general knowledge, such as curiosity about the intimate secrets of other people. It is a facet of openness to experience in the Five Factor Model used to describe human personalities. It is similar to need for cognition and typical intellectual engagement.

== History ==
In antiquity, the Roman philosopher Cicero wrote about humans' innate love of learning:

So great is our innate love of learning and of knowledge that no one can doubt that man's nature is strongly attracted to these things even without the lure of any profit. For my part, I believe Homer had something of this sort in view in his imaginary account of the songs of the Sirens. Apparently, it was not the sweetness of their voices or the novelty and diversity of their songs, but their professions of knowledge that used to attract the passing voyagers; it was the passion for learning that kept men rooted to the Sirens' rocky shores.

— Marcus Tullius Cicero,

In 1738, the Scottish philosopher David Hume differentiated intellectual curiosity from a more primitive form of curiosity:

The same theory, that accounts for the love of truth in mathematics and algebra, may be extended to morals, politics, natural philosophy, and other studies, where we consider not the other abstract relations of ideas, but their real connexions and existence. But besides the love of knowledge, which displays itself in the sciences, there is a certain curiosity implanted in human nature, which is a passion derived from a quite different principle. Some people have an insatiable desire of knowing the actions and circumstances of their neighbors, though their interest be no way concerned in them, and they must entirely depend on others for their information; in which case, there is no room for study or application. Let us search for the reason of this phenomenon.

— David Hume, A treatise of human nature (p. 453),

In Martin Heidegger's 1927 influential work Being and Time, he remarks that all forms of intellectual curiosity are clearing up the Dasein. In the section of the text relevant to curiosity, he begins by starting off with literature on basic sight as a form of "uncovering the Dasein". However, this (on basic sight allowing humans to realize their Dasein) is later generalized to include almost all forms of intellectual inquiry. He also cites Saint Augustine's Confessions for developing this idea.

Later, in 1954, Berlyne differentiated it into perceptual curiosity and epistemic curiosity, and in 2004 a psychometric scale to assess epistemic and perceptual curiosity was developed.

== Intellectual development in children ==
Humans seem to be born with intellectual curiosity, but depending on how parents react to questions from their children, intellectual curiosity might be increased or decreased. Parents that always react negatively to questions asked by their children, are discouraging them from asking questions, and that is likely to make them less curious. On the other hand, parents that always react positively to questions asked by their children, are encouraging them to ask questions, and that is likely to make them more curious.

== Academic performance ==
Intellectual curiosity has been positively correlated with academic performance (0.20), together with general intelligence (0.35) and conscientiousness (0.20).

== Scientific progress ==
Toby E. Huff has argued that the European civilization had a high level of intellectual curiosity during the scientific revolution. He also argues that other civilizations have had a high level of intellectual curiosity in their most progressive stages.

== Neurobiological basis ==
The temporal lobe is involved in understanding. Intellectual curiosity might be regarded as the trait that motivates growth of understanding in the temporal lobe. Motivation is effectuated by the neurotransmitter dopamine.

== Similarity to other concepts ==
The measures of Need for cognition (NFC) and Typical intellectual engagement (TIE) are found to be sufficiently correlated (.78) that they are argued to be measuring essentially the same trait. Keeping that in mind, measures of intellectual curiosity, NFC and TIE were found to be correlated (on average with a coefficient of .57), substantiating the supposition of their similarity.
