= Monica Yunus =

American operatic soprano (born 1977)

- মনিকা ইউনূস
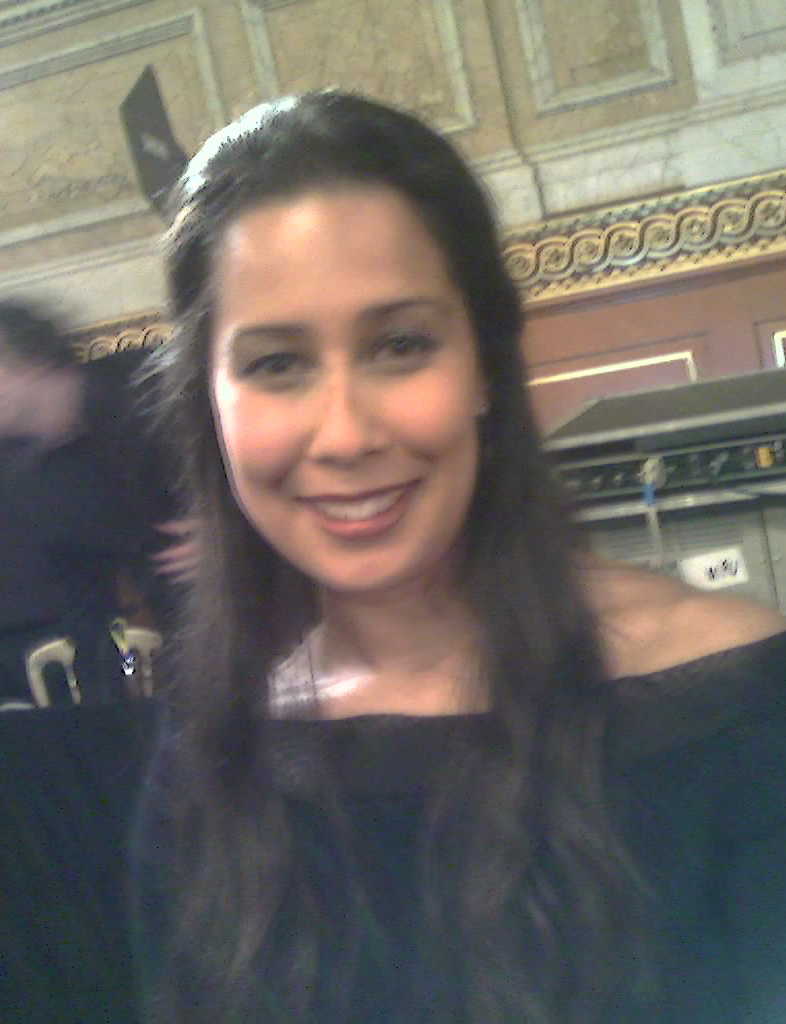
- Monica in 2014
- Born: 1977 (age 48–49); Chattogram, Bangladesh
- Citizenship: United States
- Education: Lawrenceville School; Juilliard School
- Father: Muhammad Yunus
- Relatives: Muhammad Ibrahim (uncle)
- Website: monicayunus.com

Monica Yunus (Bengali: মনিকা ইউনূস; born 1977) is a Bangladeshi-American operatic soprano who has performed with many opera companies and music ensembles. She is the daughter of Bangladeshi social entrepreneur, banker, Nobel laureate economist and former chief adviser of the interim government, Muhammad Yunus. About her singing quality reviewers from US dailies, The New York Times, the Charleston City Paper and the Palm Beach Daily News have described her voice as "especially winning", "utterly captivating" and "a voice destined for super-stardom" respectively. Her voice's performance range lies from a low A (A3) to a high F (F6). She performed regularly at the Metropolitan Opera in New York City from 2003-2014; appearing in several broadcasts of Metropolitan Opera Live in HD.

== Early life and education ==
Monica Yunus was born in 1977 in Chattogram, Bangladesh to Muhammad Yunus, an economist and his then wife, Vera Forostenko, the daughter of Russian immigrants to Trenton, New Jersey. She has one younger half-sister, Dina Yunus. Yunus' parents met in 1967 while attending Vanderbilt University. They were married in 1970. Yunus' parents' marriage ended within months of her birth, and Forostenko returned with Monica to the United States to live with her parents, claiming that Bangladesh was not a good place to raise a baby.

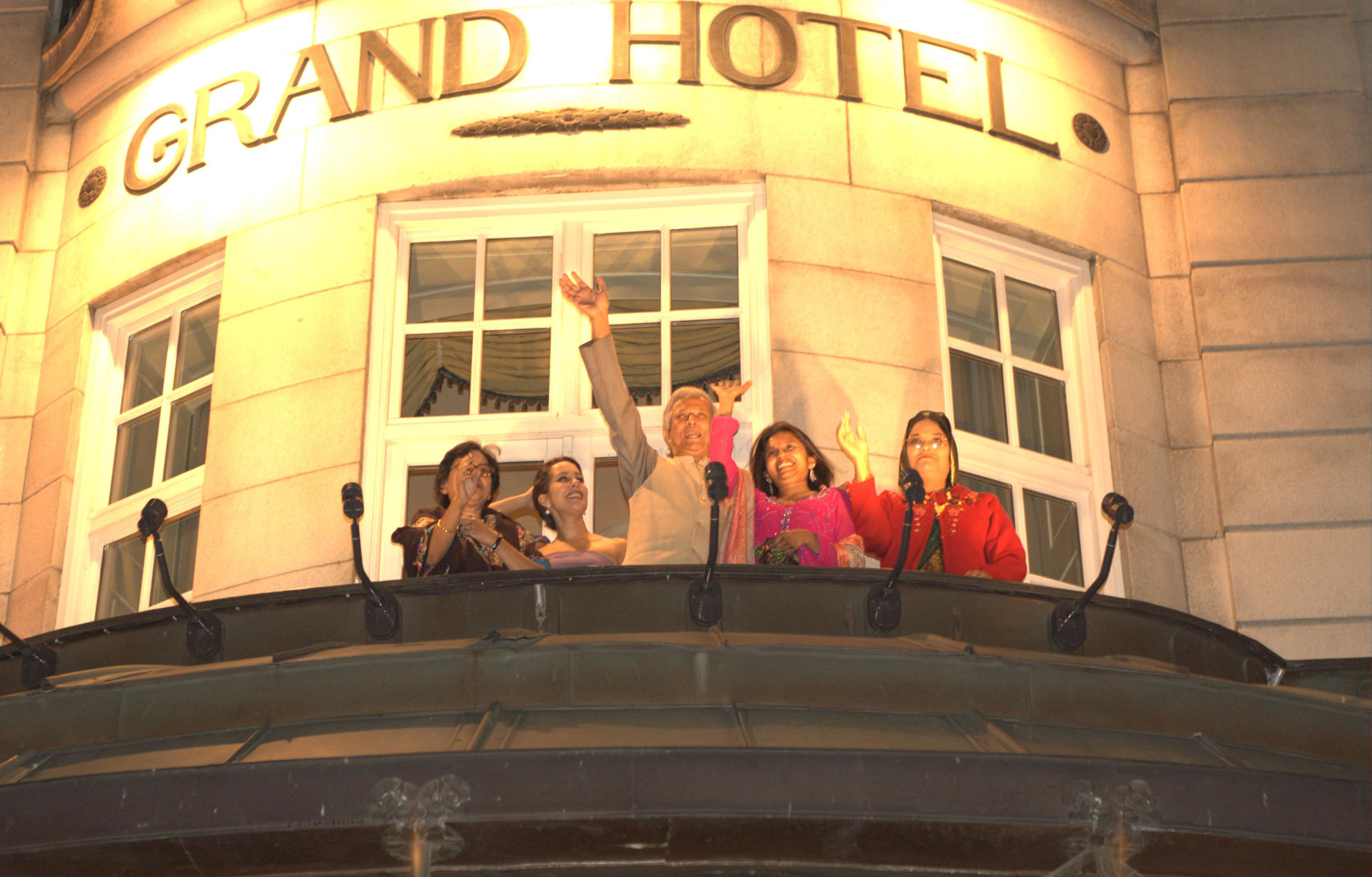
Monica with her father Muhammad Yunus in 2006

Yunus grew up in the home of her Russian grandparents in New Jersey where she learned to speak and write Russian and other Slavic languages as well as English. Yunus also speaks and writes fluently in Italian, Spanish, German, and French. Yunus' grandmother was highly influential in encouraging her interest in singing. At a very early age, Yunus' grandmother began taking her to sing in the choir at their Russian Orthodox Church, a choir Yunus would sing with throughout her entire childhood. It was while singing in this church choir that Yunus first fell in love with classical music.

At the age of eleven, Yunus' mother helped her begin studying voice formally through lessons. Shortly thereafter, Yunus became a member of the Metropolitan Opera's Children's Chorus for a number of years. At 13, Monica was accepted to the prestigious Tanglewood Music Center in Massachusetts, and this is where she first became interested in becoming a professional opera singer. Beginning at the age of 15, Yunus spent five summers at the Aspen Music Festival honing her craft with some of the world's best music teachers. While at Aspen, Yunus recorded and performed the role of Laurie in the world premiere of Copland's The Tender Land Suite, in which she can be heard on the KOCH International label.

In 1997, after attending the prestigious Lawrenceville School, Yunus entered the Juilliard School from which she graduated four years later with a Bachelor's in Vocal Performance. During this time Yunus sang in several professional operas (see below) and was a member of Berkshire Opera's Young Artist Program. She also studied at the Bay Area Summer Opera Theatre Institute in the summer of 2000. Yunus remained at Juilliard for graduate studies and earned a master's degree in Vocal Performance in 2002. While in graduate school at Juilliard, Yunus was a member of Pittsburgh Opera's Young Artist Program and she performed the role of Mrs. Hayes in Susannah at the Juilliard Opera Center.

== Career ==
In 1999, Yunus made her professional opera debut at an unusually young age with Palm Beach Opera in the role of Countess Olga in Umberto Giordano's Fedora after winning the Palm Beach Opera Competition that same year. Yunus also took first place at the Florida Grand Opera Competition and was awarded the Bori Grant For Study Abroad that year.

In 2000, Yunus returned to Palm Beach Opera to perform the role of Oscar in Un ballo in maschera opposite noted singers Richard Leech and Aprile Millo. She also was a finalist in the Lotte Lenya Competition.

In 2001, Yunus sang the role of Nanetta in Falstaff in her debut with Amato Opera.

In the 2002–2003 season, Yunus made her debut with Nashville Opera as Gretel in Engelbert Humperdinck's Hänsel und Gretel, her debut with Virginia Opera as Oscar in Un ballo in maschera, and performed the role of Walter in La Wally at Alice Tully Hall with Teatro Grattacielo. She also performed the roles of Servilia in Mozart's La clemenza di Tito and Polly in Die Dreigroschenoper with Pittsburgh Opera as part of her internship there. Yunus was also awarded a career grant from the Lee Schaenen Foundation in 2002.

In the 2003–2004 season, Yunus made her debut with Glimmerglass Opera as Fleurette in Offenbach's Bluebeard. This was followed by her Metropolitan Opera debut as Barbarina in Mozart's Le nozze di Figaro conducted by James Levine. Yunus is the only singer born in Bangladesh to have sung at the Metropolitan Opera. Yunus also sung in the Met's productions of Die Frau ohne Schatten, Le Rossignol, and The Queen of Spades that season in minor roles. Following these performances she made her European operatic debut as Oscar in Verdi's Un ballo in maschera with Mecklenburgisches Staatstheater Schwerin, where she also appeared as a last minute replacement in the role of Amor in Orfeo ed Euridice. Yunus also won the Willam Matheus Sullivan Foundation Singer Award in 2003.

In the 2004–2005 season, Yunus returned to Palm Beach Opera for their production of Hänsel und Gretel as Gretel. She also made her debuts at Anchorage Opera and the Spoleto Festival (USA) as Zerlina in Mozart's Don Giovanni. Yunus also made her debut with Granite State Opera as Gilda in Verdi's Rigoletto and returned to Nashville Opera to perform the role of Adele in Die Fledermaus. Yunus won the Mirjam Helin Competition in 2004.

In the 2005–2006 season, Yunus returned to the Metropolitan Opera to reprise the role of Barbarina and also to portray the role of Poussette in Manon. She also made her debuts with Port Opera and Austin Lyric Opera, both in the role of Zerlina in Mozart's Don Giovanni.

During the 2006-2007 season, Yunus returned to the Metropolitan Opera in the role of Papagena in Mozart's Die Zauberflöte. She also performed the title role in Zemire et Amore with Arizona Opera and Lucia in the North American premiere of Riccardo Zandonai's La farsa amorosa with Teatro Grattacielo at Alice Tully Hall in New York City. She also performed at the Spoleto Festival (USA) as Argentine in the American Premiere of Gluck's L'ile de Merlin and for a concert performance of Mahler's Symphony No. 4 with New York City's MetroChamber Orchestra. Yunus also appeared in a recital with the Los Angeles Da Camera at Carnegie Hall that was hosted by the Marilyn Horne Foundation. Other recitals that season included performances in the Berkshires, Little Rock, and at the Russian Consulate Gala concert.

In December 2006, Yunus performed at the annual Nobel Peace Prize Concert honoring her father. The event was hosted by Sharon Stone and Anjelica Huston and featured performances by Yusuf Islam (formerly Cat Stevens), Lionel Richie, John Legend, Rihanna, Paulina Rubio, Wynonna, Simply Red, Hakim, Renée Fleming, and Morten Abel as well as Yunus.

In the 2007–2008 season, Yunus appeared as Norina in Donizetti's Don Pasquale with Syracuse Opera, reprised the role of Papagena at the Metropolitan Opera, sang at the Al Bustan International Festival of Music and Arts in Beirut, Lebanon, and gave a recital in Sarasota, Florida. Yunus also performed in concert with Plácido Domingo and Julia Migenes at the Cairo Opera House.

In the 2008–2009 season, Yunus returned to the Metropolitan Opera for several performances including singing at the company's 125th Anniversary Gala and appearing as Poussette in Manon, Zerlina in Don Giovanni, and Yvette in La Rondine. In addition, she appeared in concert at the Tilles Center in New York and at the Francisco Marroquín University in Guatemala City. She has since returned to the Met as the Novice in Suor Angelica (2009), Papagena in The Magic Flute (2010), Alice in Le comte Ory (2011), Yvette in La rondine (2013), the unborn in Die Frau ohne Schatten, and a member of the Quartet in the world premiere of The Enchanted Island (2011-2014).

Other recent appearances by Yunus include the roles of Countess Almaviva in The Marriage of Figaro with Omaha Opera (2010), Gilda in Rigoletto with Montana Lyric Opera (2010), Lauretta in Gianni Schicchi with Opera Santa Barbara (2016), Pamina in The Magic Flute with Omaha Opera (2013), Susanna in The Marriage of Figaro with Opera Memphis (2016), and Yum-Yum in The Mikado with Opera Memphis. In 2017, she was scheduled to appear as Musetta in La bohème with Opera Colorado.

Yunus' other concert and recital appearances include solo recitals at Carnegie Hall's Weill Recital Hall, Alice Tully Hall, the Cooper-Hewitt Museum, and Steinway Hall, in New York, at the Manuel de Falla Hall in Granada, Spain, and at Madrid's Auditorio Nacional with Her Majesty Queen Sofia in attendance. She has also performed in recital at Steinway Hall. Chamber works performed include Delage's Four Hindu Poems in concert in Alice Tully Hall, and Mozart's Exsultate Jubilate at St. Anselm's Church in New York.

== Personal life ==
In 2004, Yunus reconnected with her father Muhammad Yunus, a Nobel Peace Prize recipient, whom she had not seen since her early childhood. Yunus and her father took a trip together to Bangladesh in 2005, the first time Yunus had been in the country since she was four months old. She is married to another opera singer, tenor Brandon McReynolds, whom she met at Juilliard.

Yunus was inspired by the events of 9/11 to co-found Sing For Hope, an organization that harnesses the power of the arts to create a better world.
