= General knowledge =

Type of information

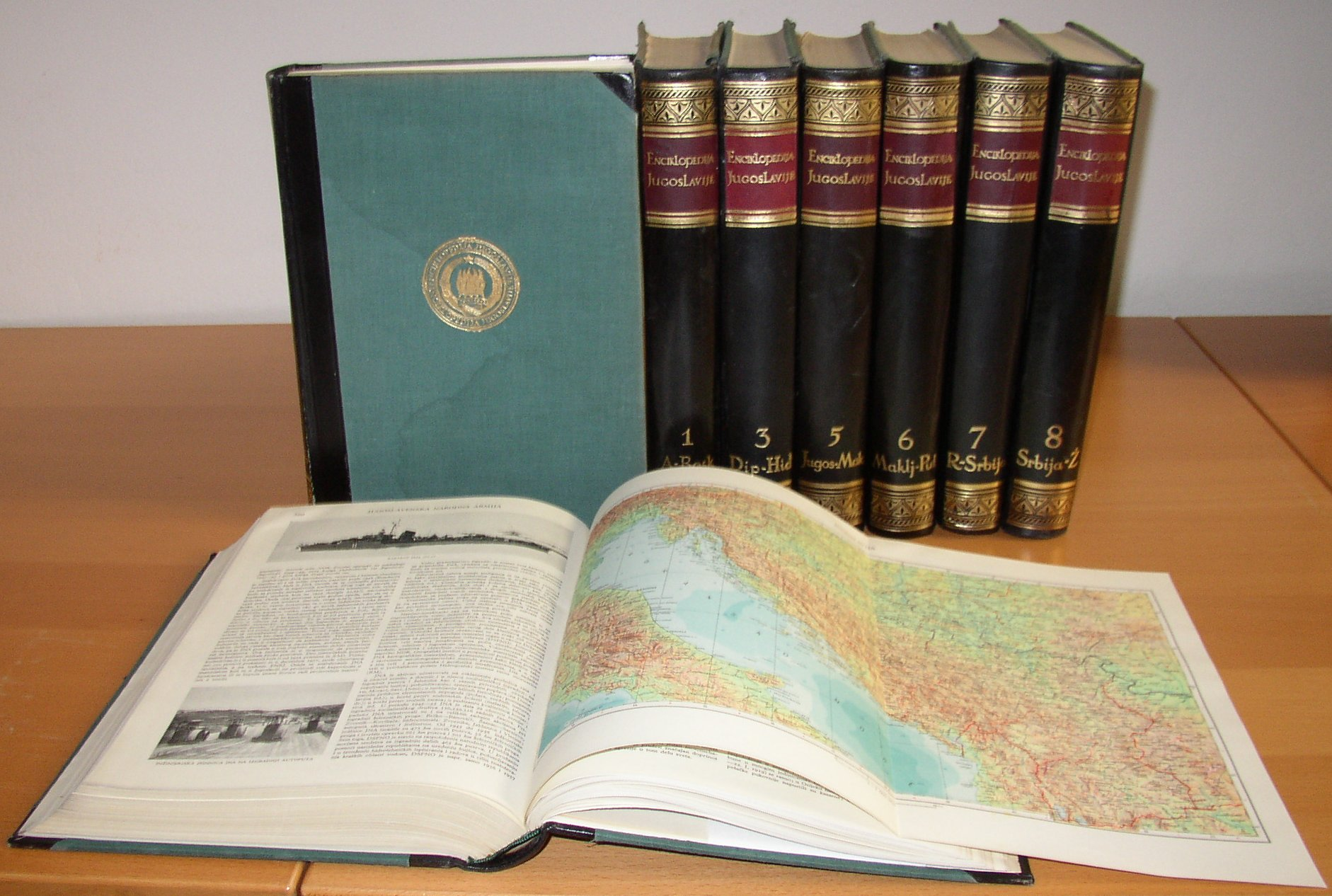
An encyclopedia is a repository of general knowledge.

General knowledge is information that has been accumulated over time through various media and sources. It excludes specialized learning that can only be obtained with extensive training and information confined to a single medium. General knowledge is an essential component of crystallized intelligence. It is strongly associated with general intelligence and with openness to experience.

Studies have found that people who are highly knowledgeable in a particular domain tend to be knowledgeable in many. General knowledge is thought to be supported by long-term semantic memory ability. General knowledge also supports schemata for textual understanding.

== Individual differences ==
=== Intelligence ===
High scorers on tests of general knowledge tend to also score highly on intelligence tests. IQ has been found to robustly predict general knowledge scores even after accounting for differences in age, and five-factor model personality traits. However, many general knowledge tests are designed to create a normal distribution of answers, creating a bell-shaped curve.

General knowledge is also moderately associated with verbal ability, though only weakly or not at all with numerical and spatial ability. As with crystallized intelligence, general knowledge has been found to increase with age.

=== Long-term semantic memory ===
General knowledge is stored as semantic memory. Most semantic memory is preserved through old age, though there are deficits in retrieval of certain specific words correlated with aging. In addition, stress or various emotional levels can negatively affect semantic memory retrieval.

=== Personality ===
People high in general knowledge tend to be highly open to new experiences and in typical intellectual engagement. The relationship between openness to experience and general knowledge remains robust even when IQ is taken into account. People high in openness may be more motivated to engage in intellectual pursuits that increase their knowledge. Relationships between general knowledge and other five factor model traits tend to be weak and inconsistent. Though one study found that extraversion and neuroticism were negatively correlated with general knowledge, others found that they were unrelated. Inconsistent results have also been found for conscientiousness. (Note: Furnham et al. found positive correlations with general knowledge in his first and third studies, but no significant relationship in his second. Studies by others have found no significant relationship.)

== Predictor of achievement ==
A number of studies have assessed whether performance on a general knowledge test can predict achievement in particular areas, namely in academics, proofreading, and creativity.

=== Academic achievement ===
General knowledge helps to perform well on government exams The study examined cognitive ability and personality predictors of exam performance and found that general knowledge was positively correlated with GCSE English, mathematics, Grammar, History, Science and overall exam results. General knowledge test scores predicted exam results, even after controlling for IQ, five-factor model personality traits, and learning styles.

=== Proofreading ===
General knowledge has been found to robustly predict proofreading skills in university students. A study found that proofreading had a larger correlation with general knowledge than with general intelligence, verbal reasoning, or openness to experience. In a multiple regression analysis using general knowledge, general intelligence, verbal reasoning, five factor personality traits, and learning styles as predictors, only general knowledge was a significant predictor.

=== Creativity ===
General knowledge has been found to have weak associations with measures of creativity. In a study examining contributions of personality and intelligence to creativity, general knowledge was positively correlated with divergent thinking tests, but was unrelated to a biographical measure of creative achievement, self-rated creativity, or a composite measure of creativity. The relationship between general knowledge and divergent thinking became non-significant when controlling for fluid intelligence.

== Game shows and quizzes ==
Many game shows use general knowledge questions for entertainment purposes. Game shows such as Who Wants to Be a Millionaire? and Fifteen to One centre their questions on general knowledge, while other shows focus questions more on specific subjects. Some shows ask questions both on specific subjects and on general knowledge, including Eggheads and Mastermind. In Mastermind, contestants choose their own "specialist subject" before answering general knowledge questions, whereas in Eggheads the subjects are chosen at random. The game show Jeopardy! tests contestants' knowledge.

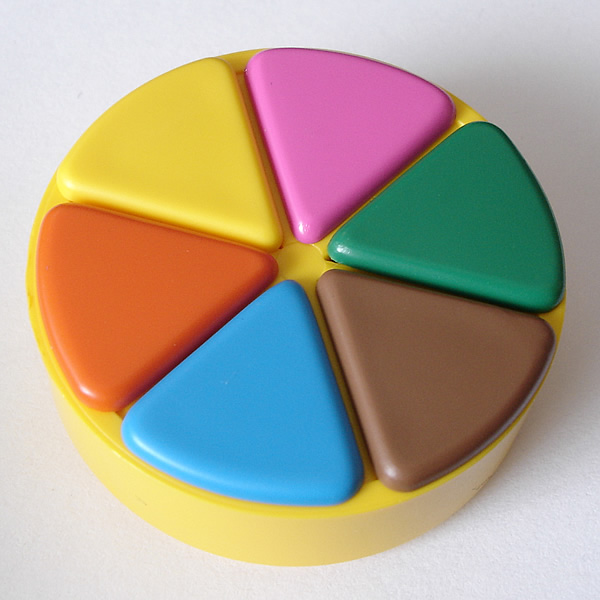
Questions drawn from the game Trivial Pursuit have been used in a number of psychological experiments concerning general knowledge.

== See also ==
- IQ
- Intelligence
- High culture
- Cattell–Horn–Carroll theory
- Cultural literacy
- Core Knowledge Foundation
- Upper ontology – Ontology applicable across domains of knowledge
