= Adjurist =

An adjurist (from the Latin word adjure, meaning to swear or to exorcise) is a follower of religious teachings that, per the Catholic Encyclopedia, are defined as "an urgent demand made upon another to do something, or to desist from doing something, which demand is rendered more solemn and more irresistible by coupling with it the name of God or of some sacred person or thing."

== Description ==
There are few references to adjurists in modern literatures, though obscure mentions of the group can be found in theological and philosophical writings.

Media references to such groups continues to become mainstreams with articles appearing in the Washington Post in February, 2008 highlighted the rise of such activities noting "About 70 priests serve as trained exorcists in Poland, about double the number of five years ago. An estimated 300 exorcists are active in Italy. Foremost among them: the Gabriele Amorth, 82, who performs exorcisms daily in Rome and is dean of Europe's corps of demon-battling priests."

In popular culture, the adjurist concept was used in the straight-to-video film The Devil's Tomb, starring Cuba Gooding Jr. and Ron Perlman. In the movie, Henry Rollins plays a priest claiming to be a member of a group performing exorcisms and ingesting evil spirits.

Within theosophy, Helena Petrovna Blavatsky wrote there are references to "the Adjurists, Exorcists, Conjurerists, and Intercessors" in relation to Nigromancy, or the practice of the black arts. Ascribing evil intent to adjurists is common in older texts, though some believe their actions to be misunderstood and actually noble."
