= Stickler =

Stickler is a family name. Notable people with the surname include:

- Alfons Maria Stickler (1910–2007), Austrian Roman Catholic clergyman
- Carla Stickler, American musical theatre actress
- Dick Stickler (born 1940), American politician
- Friedrich Stickler (born 1949), Austrian football official
- Gunnar B. Stickler (1925–2010), German-American pediatrician
- Helen Stickler (born 1968), American filmmaker
- Jason Stickler, a fictional character on the television series Cory in the House

== Other uses ==
- Stickler syndrome
