= Purple crocodile =

Metaphor for bureaucracy in the Netherlands

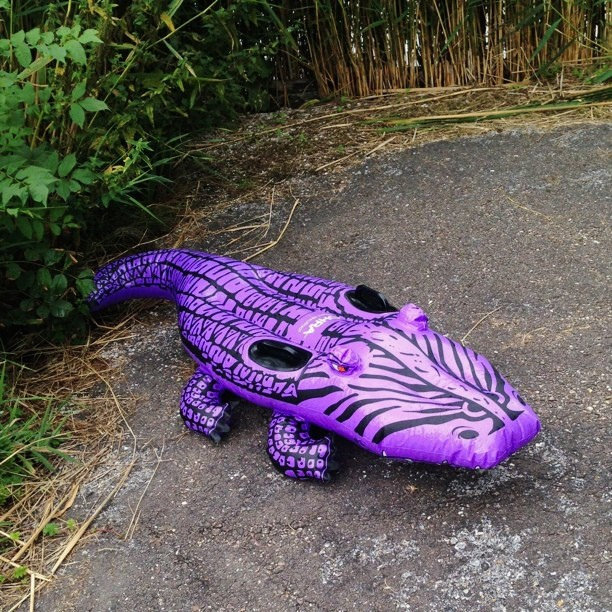
A purple crocodile similar to the one in the ad

The phrase purple crocodile (Dutch: Paarse krokodil) originates from a 2004 television advertisement by the Dutch insurance company OHRA promoting their lack of red tape. The purple crocodile has since become a metaphor for bureaucracy in the Netherlands.

== Description of the advertisement ==
External videos
- Paarse krokodil - commercial OHRA, on YouTube

The advertisement consists of a single sketch in which a mother and her daughter appear at the lost and found desk of a public swimming pool. The mother explains to the receptionist that the previous day her daughter left her inflatable purple crocodile at the swimming pool.

The receptionist hands the mother a form which must be filled out on both sides and handed in the following day between 9 and 10 AM, while the purple crocodile, which her daughter had lost is seen standing in a corner of the reception desk. The mother then points at the purple crocodile and says that "it's right there". The receptionist says in a sneering tone "yes, it is right there" but takes no action.

== Appearance in Dutch law ==
A 2006 law Wijzigingswet belastingwetten ter vermindering van administratieve lasten aimed at reducing red tape has the official shortened name Wijzigingsplan «Paarse krokodil» (Amendment "Purple crocodile").
