= Ibrahim AlHusseini =

American film producer

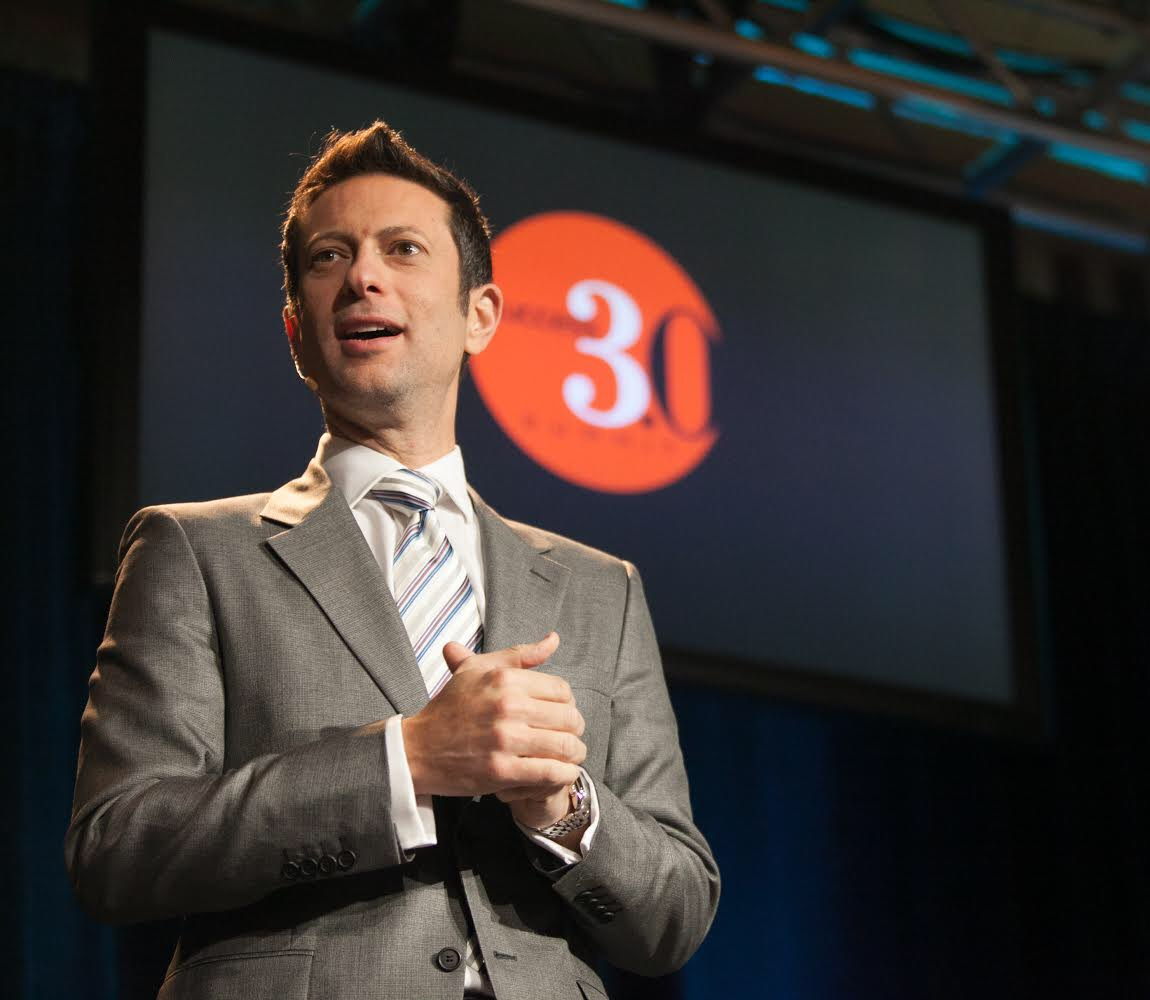
- Education: University of Washington
- Occupation: Venture capitalist
- Organizations: FullCycle; Husseini Group
- Website: Official Website

Ibrahim AlHusseini is a venture capitalist, entrepreneur, and environmentalist. He is the founder and CEO of FullCycle, an investment company accelerating the deployment of climate-restoring technologies. AlHusseini is also the founder and managing partner of The Husseini Group.

He is the secretary of the anti-war group, Code Pink, and was previously a board member of the Center for Integral Wisdom. He served as the co-executive producer of the 2013 Academy Award-nominated documentary, The Square. In 2015, AlHusseini won a Global Green Millennium Award for his efforts in combating global climate change.

== Early life and education ==
AlHusseini was born in Jordan and was raised in Saudi Arabia by parents who are Palestinian refugees. He immigrated to the United States in the 1990s to attend college at the University of Washington, and currently resides in Los Angeles.

== Career ==
=== Financial career ===
AlHusseini has started and sold numerous companies throughout his entrepreneurial career. These include MECA Communications, which introduced the world's first interoperable instant messaging application Natural Solutions, and PakIT, the last of which is a packaging company that developed food-grade packaging material from biodegradable cellulose.

He was also an early investor in Tesla Motors, Bloom Energy, Aspiration, Uber, CleanChoice Energy and numerous other companies with an environmentally-friendly focus.

In 2013, AlHusseini founded the FullCycle, an investment firm that focuses on climate-critical technologies and infrastructure projects. The investments are in technologies that target short-lived climate pollutants. The company has made investments in engineering and technology firm, Synova, controlled environment agriculture company, Sustainitech, textile innovations company, Evrnu and micro-hydro startup, InPipe Energy.

=== Entertainment career ===
In 2013, AlHusseini co-executive produced the documentary, The Square, about the Egyptian Revolution of 2011 that began at Tahrir Square. The film was nominated for the Academy Award for Best Documentary Feature at the 86th Academy Awards. The film was also nominated for 4 Emmy Awards and won 3 at the 66th Primetime Creative Arts Emmy Awards. He is also the executive producer on the films, Space Oddity and Canary.

== Legal Issues ==
In October 2024, AlHusseini was arrested and charged with securities fraud by the United States Federal Bureau of Investigation. In March, he pleaded guilty to wire fraud.
