= Carla Stickler =

American musical theatre actress

Carla Stickler is an American semi-retired musical theatre actress, who is best known for her work on the musical Wicked (as an ensemble member, and an understudy for Elphaba). She is mainly a software engineer (at G2 in Chicago) who came back in 2022 to Broadway to fill in for Elphaba due to the COVID-19 pandemic in New York.

== Early life and education ==
Carla Stickler was born in Chicago. As a kid, she was frequently exposed to music, as her mother was in a chamber ensemble, her grandmother was an opera performer, her cousin was a drummer, and her father was a former member of the band "Stuck in the Fifties."

She soon began performing in the Oak Park River Forest Children's Choir. In high school, she spent four summers at Interlochen Arts Camp, where she majored in Musical Theatre, Choir, and Fine Arts. She then transferred schools for her senior year to attend Interlochen Arts Academy, where she majored in vocal music and ceramics.

For college, Stickler went to NYU's Tisch School of the Arts to become a theatre major.

Stickler attended grad school at Steinhardt School of Culture, Education, and Human Development, where she was a Kappa Delta Pi member. She attended the department of music and performing arts professions. She graduated in 2016.

In 2019, she studied computer software engineering at Flatiron School.

== Career ==
Right after graduation, Stickler landed the role of Liesl in the Asian tour of The Sound of Music, a musical made by the duo of Rodgers & Hammerstein. Afterwards, the next tour she participated in was the 2nd national tour of ABBA's Mamma Mia! (which launched in 2002), in which she was the understudy for the role of Sophie.

=== Wicked ===
Stickler eventually auditioned for a role in the first national tour of the Tony Award-winning musical Wicked, becoming the standby for Elphaba in 2010. She then transitioned to the Broadway production of the show, where she was an understudy for Elphaba. When not portraying Elphaba, she also appeared as a part of the ensemble. She held her first solo concert, entitled Option Up, in The Metropolitan Room on June 1, 2015, with guest stars Bree Lowdermilk, Drew Overcash, and Zoe Sarnak. She left the Wicked company on June 19, 2015, after five years on Broadway and on tour.

Stickler teaches private voice lessons in her spare time. She also returns to the Broadway production of Wicked frequently, filling in during vacations as the understudy for the roles of Elphaba and Nessarose, while also performing in the ensemble of the show.

== Credits ==
=== Theatre ===
- The Sound of Music, Liesl, Asian Tour
- Mamma Mia!, Sophie, 2nd national Tour
- Save the Goondocks, The Prop/One Eyed Willy, New York Fringe Festival
- Songs for a New World, Woman 1, HERE Arts Center
- Joseph and the Amazing Technicolor Dreamcoat, Narrator, New London Barn Playhouse
- Man of La Mancha, Antonia, Staten Island Philharmonic
- Wicked, Elphaba, 1st national tour (2010-2012)
- Wicked, Elphaba understudy & Ensemble, Broadway (2012-2015)
- Boys Vs Girls (concert), Katie, Last Call Theatricals (2015)
- The Music of Menken: Audrey, Ariel, Aladdin...and Alan! An Evening with Alan Menken, Nebraska Thespian Festival (2015)
- Sparks of Creation, Nebraska Thespian Festival (2016)
- Wicked, Elphaba emergency standby, Broadway (2022)

=== Workshops ===
- Saved by the Bell the Musical, Kelly Kapowski, RASH! Theatre Co.
- Inspector Gadget the Opera, Penny, Steinhardt School of Education
- Kid Dracula, Lil'Lil, Ted Zurkowski and Scott Flaherty
- Mary of Magdala, Little Girl, James Olm and Shad Olsen
- Stranger to the Muse, Ashley, Patrick Gallagher and Adam David Cohen

=== Film ===
- Brand New Day, Kate, dir. Mark Roso, Columbia Student Films (short)
- Pressure, lead, 40th Floor Productions

=== Concerts ===
- Oh Glacuoma! Benefit Concert (2012) – sang Giving Up Later
- Making Magic: Defying Gravity (2012) – featured, concert series
- Nebraska Thespian Festival (2014) – sang Defying Gravity and The Wizard and I
- Option Up, The Metropolitan Room (2015) – solo debut
- Broadway Back to School, 54 Below (2015)
- Numerous benefit concerts with the cast of Wicked

=== Discography ===
- Oh, Glacuoma! Benefit Concert: Live (2012)
  - sings Giving Up Later
- Broadway's Carols For a Cure: Vol. 16 (2014)
  - sings In the Bleak Midwinter
