= Typical intellectual engagement =

Forms of attraction to cognition

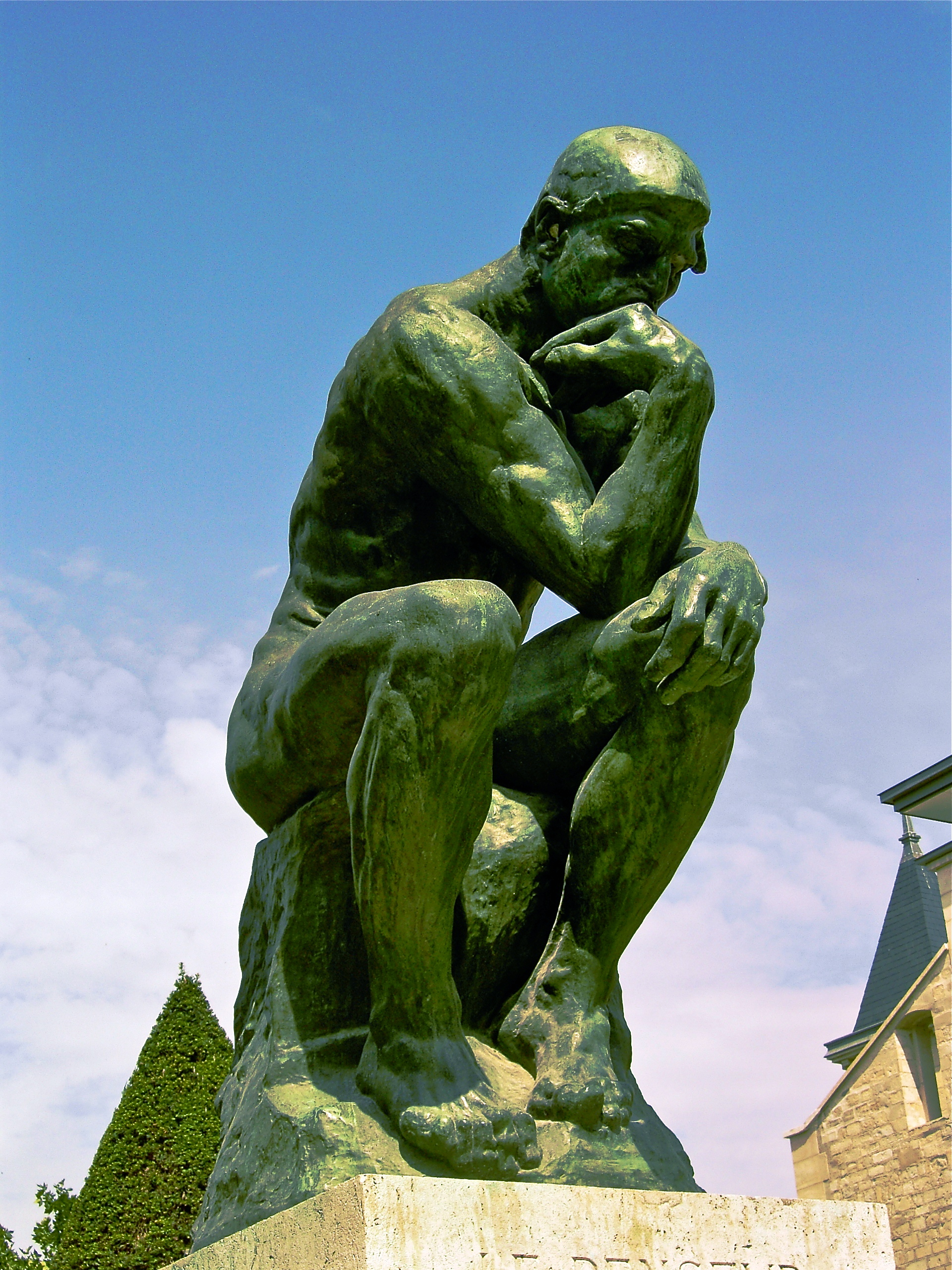
People high in typical intellectual engagement particularly enjoy deep thought.

Typical intellectual engagement (TIE) is a personality construct referring to a person's enjoyment (or dislike) of intellectually demanding activities. TIE was developed to identify aspects of personality most closely related to intelligence and knowledge and measures a person's typical performance in intellectual domains rather than their maximal performance (intellectual capacity measured by IQ tests). TIE is moderately positively associated with crystallized intelligence, and with general knowledge, and predicts academic performance. TIE is hard to distinguish from the earlier construct need for cognition and is positively correlated with openness to experience.

== Typical performance vs. maximal performance ==
Goff and Ackerman proposed a distinction between typical and maximal performance on intellectual tasks. Traditional approaches to intelligence testing attempt to assess capacity or maximal performance and aim to minimise the impact of situational or environmental factors on test performance in order to assess the individual's full potential. Test givers and designers do acknowledge that intelligence test performance is not independent of motivational or volitional factors, as test takers are typically encouraged to "do their best" when taking intelligence tests. Personality tests in contrast to intelligence tests, focus on how a person typically behaves. Goff and Ackerman argued that this is analogous to the concept of intelligence as typical performance, that is, how a person routinely behaves when performing intellectual tasks. Goff and Ackerman argued that it is not practical or desirable to separate intellectual performance from motivational and volitional factors. The latter may be influenced by both temperamental (personality) and situational factors (e.g. incentives, interest in the task). The construct of Typical Intellectual Engagement was developed to identify the overlapping area between personality and intelligence and attempts to assess "intelligence as typical performance". Goff and Ackerman developed TIE scale items to "differentiate among individuals in their typical expression of a desire to engage and understand their world, their interest in a wide variety of things, and their preference for a complete understanding of a complex topic". TIE scales assess three facets: problem-directed thinking (e.g. "I really enjoy tasks that involve coming up with new solutions to problems"), abstract thinking (e.g. "thinking is not my idea of fun" – reverse scored), and reading (e.g. "I read a great deal").

== Relationships with intelligence, interests and academic performance ==
Goff and Ackerman found that TIE was moderately associated with crystallized intelligence (r = .33) and weakly associated with fluid intelligence (r = .11). Goff and Ackerman suggested that the relationship between TIE and crystallized intelligence might reflect an overlap between the constructs (as crystallized intelligence involves acquired knowledge), or it might reflect an influence of crystallized intelligence on TIE, or a symbiotic relationship between the two. TIE had strong positive correlations with measures of academic interests (e.g. interest in arts and humanities, science, social science but not interest in technology) and with a measure of academic comfort. A study examining predictors of general knowledge found that TIE had a significant positive association with a measure of general knowledge (r = .36). However, the relationship between TIE and general knowledge became non-significant when differences in intelligence were taken into account. A meta-analysis found that TIE was a significant predictor of academic performance (r = .33). The authors of this study suggested that intellectual curiosity, as measured by TIE, is a potential "third pillar" of academic achievement, the other two pillars being intelligence and effort.

== Relationship with similar constructs ==
TIE has a strong positive relationship with the personality domain openness to experience, particularly the ideas facet. Rocklin argued that TIE is largely indistinguishable from openness to experience and therefore a redundant construct. Goff and Ackerman argued though that although TIE and openness are related they are still theoretically and empirically distinguishable. Factor analysis results suggest that TIE is most strongly related to the ideas facet of openness and less strongly related to the other facets. Openness to ideas is a facet of openness to experience associated with "aspects of being open minded, engaging in unconventional thoughts, and solving problems and thinking as an end in itself". A meta-analysis found that an important difference between TIE and openness to experience is that TIE predicts academic performance, whereas openness to experience does not (once its association with TIE has been controlled). Additionally, this study found that openness to experience is more closely associated with intelligence than TIE is, and TIE is more closely associated with conscientiousness than openness to experience is. A study comparing TIE with need for cognition found that they were very strongly related (r = .78) and the authors of this study suggested that they may be essentially the same construct. Another study found that TIE had very strong positive intercorrelations with a number of similar constructs, specifically epistemic curiosity, need for cognition, and openness to ideas. Intellectual curiosity can be defined as "desire for knowledge that motivates individuals to learn new ideas, eliminate information-gaps, and solve intellectual problems". Factor analysis showed that measures of all four constructs loaded strongly onto a single factor, suggesting they all share a common conceptual basis. The author of this study argued that although the four constructs lack discriminant validity they are not necessarily all conceptually equivalent as each one may emphasise particular aspects of functioning more than others. For example, TIE has a reading facet that emphasises a particular behaviour, whereas the other constructs do not necessarily emphasise reading behaviour.

== See also ==
- Big Five personality traits
- Differential psychology
