= Julia Bullock =

American soprano

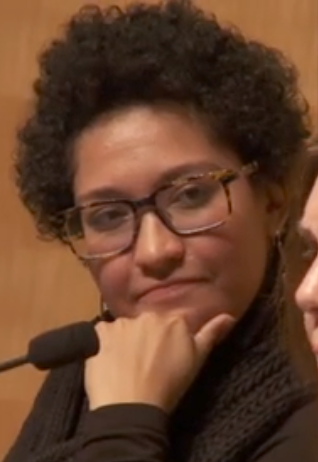
- In an interview at the San Francisco Public Library in 2017
- Born: July 16, 1986 (age 40); St. Louis, Missouri, U.S.
- Education: University of Rochester (BM); Bard College (MM); Juilliard School (GrDip)
- Occupation: Opera singer
- Spouse: Christian Reif

Julia Bullock (born July 16, 1986) is a Grammy-winning American soprano originally from St. Louis, Missouri. Anthony Tommasini from The New York Times has called her an "impressive, fast-rising soprano... poised for a significant career”.

== Early life and education ==
Born in 1986 to an African American father and a white mother, Bullock joined Opera Theatre of Saint Louis's artist-in-training program while still in high school. She graduated with the Marielle Hubner Award. She received her bachelor's degree from the Eastman School of Music at the University of Rochester and her master's from Bard College's graduate vocal-arts program, where she worked with Dawn Upshaw. She went on to complete an artist diploma program at Juilliard in 2015. She holds the Lindemann Vocal Chair with Young Concert Artists, and also is supported by the Barbara Forester Austin Fund for Art Song.

She cites Nina Simone and Billie Holiday as early influences.

== Career ==
In 2013, when she was still at Juilliard, Bullock performed with Michael Tilson Thomas and the San Francisco Symphony. She met composer John Adams, who has called her his "muse," in 2014. Bullock sang the role of Dame Shirley in San Francisco Opera's 2017 world premiere of Adams's opera Girls of the Golden West. She also premiered the role in the European debut of the opera, at the Dutch National Opera, in Amsterdam. In 2018, she starred as Kitty Oppenheimer in Adams's Doctor Atomic for Santa Fe Opera. In 2019 she premiered Zauberland, about which was inspired by Europe's migrant crisis, and has appeared in New York, London, and throughout Europe.

She served as the 2018–2019 Metropolitan Museum of Art's performance series Artist in Residence. While there, she and percussionist Tyshawn Sorey performed Perle Noire: Meditations for Joséphine, a tribute to Black jazz artist Josephine Baker. They previously performed the piece in 2016 as part of Cal Performances. The piece made its European debut at the Dutch National Opera's Opera Forward Festival in Amsterdam on March 9, 2023.

Bullock's first solo album, Walking in the Dark, debuted in 2022. Her husband, Christian Reif, conducted and played the piano. The album includes pieces by composers John Adams, Samuel Barber, Connie Converse, and Sandy Denny. At the 66th Grammy Awards, the album won for Best Classical Solo Vocal Album.

In 2024 she was slated to co-create and perform the new opera The Shell Trial at the Dutch National Opera, but withdrew from the production. She was replaced by Soprano Lauren Michelle. In April 2024 Bullock continued her collaboration with John Adams, performing the staged version of his oratorio El Niño at the Metropolitan Opera.

In April 2024, Bullock was featured on the cover of Opera, in preparation for her Metropolitan Opera debut in El Niño.

=== Activism ===
Bullock integrates her musical life with community activism. She has organized benefit concerts for the Shropshire Music Foundation and International Playground, two non-profits that serve war-affected children and adolescents through music education and performance programs in Kosovo, Northern Ireland, Uganda, and St. Louis. She also participated in the Music and Medicine Benefit Concert for New York's Weill Medical Center. She also serves on the advisory board of Turn the Spotlight, which works to promote equity in the arts.

=== Accolades ===
- First Prize at the 2012 Young Concert Artists International Auditions
- First Prize at the 2014 Naumburg International Vocal Competition
- 2015 – Leonore Annenberg Arts Fellowship
- 2015 – Richard F. Gold Grant from the Shoshana Foundation
- Lincoln Center's 2015 Martin E. Segal Award
- 2016 – Sphinx Medal of Excellence
- 2024 – Grammy for Best Classical Solo Vocal Album for Walking in the Dark

== Personal life ==
Bullock is married to conductor Christian Reif, with whom she has a son. As of January 2021, she was living in Munich, Germany.
