= Paul Appleby (tenor) =

American operatic tenor (born 1983)

- Born: June 29, 1983 (age 43); Chicago, Illinois, USA
- Occupation: Opera singer (tenor)
- Website: paulapplebytenor.com

Paul Appleby (born June 29, 1983) is an American operatic tenor. In 2009 he won the Metropolitan Opera National Council Auditions. In November 2015 he made his debut at the San Francisco Opera as Tamino in Mozart's The Magic Flute. In December 2015 he was the tenor soloist in Mozart's Coronation Mass with the Pittsburgh Symphony Orchestra, and in January 2016 he performed Belmonte in Mozart's Die Entführung aus dem Serail with the Ann Arbor Symphony Orchestra. He sang Belmonte again at the Metropolitan Opera in May 2016.

He performed again as Tamino in Mozart's The Magic Flute at the Glyndebourne Festival Opera, Washington National Opera, and the Teatro Real de Madrid, and performed in many other Mozart roles, including as Don Ottavio in Don Giovanni at the San Diego Opera, and the Metropolitan Opera, as Belmonte in Die Entführung aus dem Serail at the Dutch National Opera, as Aginore in Il re pastore at Opera Theater of Saint Louis, as Gomatz in Zaide at Wolf Trap Opera, and as Ferrando in Cosí fan tutte at Boston Lyric Opera, Canadian Opera Company, and Oper Frankfurt.

He sang as Fritz in La Grande Duchesse de Gerolstein at the Santa Fe Opera.

He performed as Pelléas in Pelléas et Mélisande at the Metropolitan Opera, and at the Dutch National Opera.

He performed the role of Candide in Candide at the Gran Teatro del Liceu, Opera de Lyon, at Carnegie Hall with the Orchestra of St. Luke's, and the Festival d'Aix en Provence.

He performed in Christopher Cerrone's In a Grove at the Prototype Festival.

He performed as Tom Rakewell in The Rake's Progress at The Metropolitan Opera, Festival d'Aix en Provence, the Dutch National Opera, and Oper Frankfurt. He also performed in a performance of Stravinsky's Pulcinella at the Toronto Symphony Orchestra, Oedipus Rex at the Munich Philharmonic and again as Oedipus in a performance of Stravinsky called Jocasta's Line at Den Norske Oper.

He notably sang as Joe Cannon in the premiere of Girls of the Golden West, by John Adams, at the San Francisco Opera in 2017, and then at the Dutch National Opera, The Barbican Centre, and the Los Angeles Philharmonic.

He performed as Caesar in the premiere of Antony and Cleopatra, also by John Adams, at San Francisco Opera in 2022, at the Gran Teatre del Liceu, and again at the Metropolitan Opera in 2025.

In his work with American Modern Opera Company (AMOC*), he performed in many projects, including Music for New Bodies, by Matthew Aucoin, at Lincoln Center and Tanglewood, The No One's Rose, by Matthew Aucoin, at Philharmonia Baroque Orchestra, Rome is Falling, by Doug Balliett, at Lincoln Center and The Ojai Music Festival.

He performed leading roles in several operas by Berlioz including Hylas in Les Troyens with the Metropolitan Opera, Roméo in Roméo et Juliette with Grant Park Music Festival, a concert called A Danação De Fausto with The Calouste Gulbenkian Foundation, Bénédict in Béatrice et Bénédict with Oper Köln, Opéra National de Paris, and the Glyndebourne Festival.

Other roles at the Metropolitan Opera in New York included Demetrius in The Enchanted Island, David in Die Meistersinger von Nürnberg, Bryan in Two Boys, Chevalier de La Force in Dialogues des Carmélites, Brighella in Ariadne auf Naxos.

He sang many performances of Matthäus Passion, BWV 244, including at the Cathedral of St. John the Divine, Music of the Baroque Orchestra, The New York Philharmonic, and the International Sacred Music Festival.

Appleby gave many recitals, including at the Park Avenue Armory, The Schimmel Center for the Arts, The American Philosophical Society in Philadelphia, The George London Foundation, and Carnegie Hall.

Appleby is a graduate of St. Joseph High School (South Bend, Indiana), and the University of Notre Dame.

Appleby graduated from the Metropolitan Opera's Lindemann Young Artist Development Program and received the 2012 Leonore Annenberg Fellowship in the Performing and Visual Arts.

== Awards ==
- 2012: Leonore Annenberg Fellowship in the Performing and Visual Arts.
- 2012: Gerda Lissner Foundation.
- 2012: Martin E. Segal Award.

== Repertoire (selection) ==
- Bénédict, Béatrice et Bénédict (Berlioz)
- Belmonte, Die Entführung aus dem Serail (Mozart)
- Brian, Two Boys (Nico Muhly)
- Brighella, Ariadne auf Naxos (Richard Strauss) – Metropolitan Opera debut (2011)
- David, Die Meistersinger von Nürnberg (Wagner)
- Don Ottavio, Don Giovanni (Mozart)
- Ferrando, Così fan tutte (Mozart)
- Jonathan, Saul (Handel)
- Lysander, A Midsummer Night's Dream (Britten)
- Tamino, Die Zauberflöte (Mozart)
- Tom Rakewell, The Rake's Progress (Stravinsky)

== Recordings ==
- Stravinsky's Pulcinella; Le Baiser de la Fée (Paul Appleby / Gustavo Gimeno / Isabel Leonard / Toronto Symphony Orchestra); released 2025
- John Adams: Girls of the Golden West (Los Angeles Philharmonic); Released 2024
- Harold Meltzer: Songs and Structures; Released 2018
- Brian in Nico Muhly's Two Boys with conductor David Robertson, Metropolitan Opera, released 2013, Nonesuch Records
- Dear Theo: Three Song Cycles by Ben Moore with Paul Appleby, Susanna Phillips, Brett Polegato; Brian Zeger, piano; released 2014, Delos Productions
- Music@Menlo 2011: Through Brahms Disc 4: Schubert, Schumann, Brahms, Rachmaninov; Released 2012
- The Juilliard Sessions: Paul Appleby; Schubert and Britten Songs, EMI Classics, 2012
- Mozart: Mass in C minor & Piano Concerto No. 22 in E-flat major, K. 482 New York Philharmonic Alan Gilbert & Emanuel Ax, New York Philharmonic, 2012
- Musto, Bolcom: Two New Comic Operas (New York Festival of Song); Released 2010

== DVDs ==
- The Enchanted Island, Metropolitan Opera Live in HD, Virgin Classics 2012
- Berlioz: Béatrice et Bénédict, Glyndebourne Opera, Opus Arte 2017.
- Handel: Saul, Glyndebourne Opera, Opus Arte 2024.
