= Robert White (tenor) =

American tenor and voice teacher (1936–2026)

Robert White (October 27, 1936 – March 17, 2026) was an American tenor and voice teacher who had an active performance career for eight decades.

White began performing Irish songs on the radio in 1942 at the age of six on programs such as Coast to Coast on a Bus and The Fred Allen Show; earning the nickname the "little John McCormack". In the late 1950s, he embarked on a career as a concert tenor, and achieved success as an exponent of early music by such composers as Handel, Bach, and Monteverdi during the 1960s, 1970s, and 1980s. He has performed in concerts with several major orchestras, including the New York Philharmonic under Leonard Bernstein and the Philadelphia Orchestra under Eugene Ormandy, and has performed at the White House for Presidents John F. Kennedy and Jimmy Carter.

In the mid 1970s, White returned to his roots as a performer of Irish songs, and achieved fame internationally as an 'Irish tenor,' drawing comparison to John McCormack; he even performed on programs for BBC television in honor of the late tenor. He continued to perform in concerts with a diverse repertoire ranging from Irish ballads to opera to contemporary art songs and works from the classical tenor canon. Several composers wrote works specifically for him, including Mark Adamo, William Bolcom, John Corigliano, Lukas Foss, Stephen Hough, Libby Larsen, Lowell Liebermann, Gian Carlo Menotti, Tobias Picker, Ned Rorem, and David Del Tredici. He has made several recordings for RCA Victor Records, mainly of Irish songs and ballads, and has also recorded a diverse repertoire for Virgin Classics, EMI, and Hyperion. A one-time faculty member of Hunter College and the Manhattan School of Music, he later taught on the voice faculty of the Juilliard School. He also worked periodically as an interviewer for the radio station WQXR-FM.

== Early life and education ==
White was born in the Bronx, the fifth of six children of tenor, composer, and radio actor Joseph White and lyricist Maureen O'Byrne White. His mother was originally from Galway, Ireland, and his father was the grandson of an Irish immigrant from Kerry. His father achieved fame portraying the title role on the NBC Radio program The Silver-Masked Tenor; a program for which he also composed many of the songs. White's mother Maureen was his father's lyricist.

He began performing on WJZ radio at the age of 6 under the name Bobby White, and recorded his first album, Ring of Gold, at the age of 7. He usually performed Irish folk songs and ballads on the radio, and was dubbed by Milton Cross as "our own little John McCormack". Some of the radio programs he performed on were Coast to Coast on a Bus; Irene Wicker, the Singing Lady; and The Fred Allen Show. On the latter show, he became acquainted with The DeMarco Sisters, with whom he was notably trapped for four days during the North American blizzard of 1947. He also had the opportunity to perform with such legendary entertainers as Humphrey Bogart, Bing Crosby, and Frank Sinatra on Allen's program. By the age of 12, he was performing challenging tenor songs with full orchestras on NBC radio, such as 'Ah, Sweet Mystery of Life' from Victor Herbert's Naughty Marietta.

White's initial training as a singer was established through lessons with his father. His skills were also sharpened as a chorister at St. Jerome's Church in the Bronx. He earned a Bachelor of Music in vocal performance from Hunter College. He then pursued studies in Germany, Italy, and at the American Conservatory at Fontainebleau in France with Gerard Souzay and Nadia Boulanger. He went on to earn a Master of Music in vocal performance from the Juilliard School in 1968 where he was a pupil of Beverley Peck Johnson. While at Juilliard, he played the role of Charles in the American premiere of Paul Hindemith's The Long Christmas Dinner for the Juilliard Opera Center in 1963. He continued to study voice privately with Johnson throughout his professional career.

== Early career: 1959–1969 ==
In 1959, at the age of 22, White replaced an ailing Russell Oberlin as Pilate in Georg Böhm's St John Passion (then falsely attributed to George Frideric Handel) for performances at Carnegie Hall with the New York Philharmonic under conductor Leonard Bernstein. Later that year, he was a featured soloist in Henry Purcell's The Fairy-Queen with the Masterwork Chorus of Morristown, New Jersey. In 1960, he became a member of New York Pro Musica, first performing as a featured soloist with the group in a concert of works by Flemish composers Heinrich Isaac, Josquin des Prez, Jacob Obrecht, and Adrian Willaert at Town Hall in New York City.

In the 1960s, White performed as a member or guest artist with several early music chamber ensembles including the Clarion Concerts Orchestra, the Renaissance Quartet and Trio Flauto Dolce. In 1962, he sang Mathan in the United States premiere of Handel's Athalia at Saint Thomas Church in Manhattan in a concert conducted by Harold Aks and presented by the Interracial Music Council. In 1963, he performed with soprano Helen Boatwright, actor Basil Rathbone, and The Consort Players under the direction of Sydney Beck for a concert in the East Room of the White House that was attended by President John F. Kennedy, First Lady Jacqueline Kennedy, Eunice Kennedy Shriver, and Charlotte, Grand Duchess of Luxembourg among other dignitaries. That same year, he portrayed The Old Chess Player in the world premiere of Gian Carlo Menotti's television opera Labyrinth with the NBC Opera Theatre. In April 1964, he sang in the New York City premiere of Jack Gottlieb's Tea Party at the Donnell Library Center for the New York Composers Forum.

In December 1965, White was the tenor soloist in both Handel's Messiah and Johann Sebastian Bach's Mass in B minor with the New York Chamber Orchestra under conductor Hermann Scherchen for concerts at Philharmonic Hall in Lincoln Center. In 1966, he was the tenor soloist in Mahler's Das Lied von der Erde with contralto Lili Chookasian, the Philadelphia Orchestra, and conductor Eugene Ormandy at Lincoln Center. That same year, he performed the world premiere of John Corigliano's The Cloisters at the Solomon R. Guggenheim Museum in 1966. In 1967, he was the tenor soloist in Handel's L'Allegro, il Penseroso ed il Moderato with the Musica Aeterna Chorus & Orchestra and conductor Frederic Waldman at the Metropolitan Museum of Art. He also returned to Lincoln Center that year as the tenor soloist in Mozart's Requiem with the New York Chamber Orchestra and conductor Werner Torkanowsky for the Mostly Mozart Festival.

In 1968, White portrayed Acis in Handel's Acis and Galatea with the New York Chamber Soloists and conductor/harpsichordist Albert Fuller at the Metropolitan Museum of Art. In 1969, he was the tenor soloist in the Clarion Music Society's (CMS) performance of Claudio Monteverdi's Vespro della Beata Vergine at Avery Fisher Hall. That same year, he portrayed Egeo in Simon Mayr's Medea in Corinto at Alice Tully Hall for the CMS with Marisa Galvany in the title role.

== 1970s ==
In 1970, White performed on John Corigliano's album Caldara – A Moog Mass, in which he was featured singing through an enema tube. In 1972, he was the tenor soloist in the New York City Ballet's performance of Stravinsky's Pulcinella that used new choreography by George Balanchine and Jerome Robbins. In 1974, he was the tenor soloist in Schubert's Mass No. 2 with soprano Heather Harper, the Musica Aeterna Chorus & Orchestra, and conductor Frederic Waldman at the Metropolitan Museum of Art. In 1975, he was the tenor soloist in a concert of works by Giovanni Battista Sammartini presented by the CMS at Alice Tully Hall with conductor Newell Jenkins.

White returned to Avery Fisher Hall as the tenor soloist in Bach's Mass in B minor with The National Chorale and conductor Martin Josman in 1976. In 1977, he performed a concert of Bach duets and arias with soprano Judith Bettina at the Washington Square Music Festival under conductor Henry Schuman. That same year, he was featured in a pair of concerts with flutist Eugenia Zukerman and the renaissance ensemble Calliope at the 92nd Street Y, and returned for a command performance at the White House for President Jimmy Carter and Prime Minister James Callaghan.

In 1976, White looked back towards his Irish heritage with the release of an album of Irish ballads for RCA Victor Records entitled When You And I Were Young Maggie with pianist Samuel Sanders. His interest in programming Irish music alongside more serious classical repertoire has continued in many concerts and recitals. In 1977, he performed Irish ballads on BBC program The James Galway Hour with the renowned flautist. In a 1978 review in The New York Times historian Joseph Horowitz stated:

The Spirit of John McCormack was invoked more than a little at a wonderful recital by Robert White at the Metropolitan Museum. Mr. White, a singer whose work is well known and appreciated here, offered the sort of mixed bag of popular and concert repertoire that was a McCormack trademark.

In 1979, White released the album Robert White Sings Beethoven with cellist Yo-Yo Ma, violinist Ani Kavafian, and Sanders on piano. The album features 16 settings of Irish, Scottish, Welsh, and English folksongs that Beethoven made at the request of George Thomson. Later that year, he appeared as Alcibiade in the United States premiere of Agostino Steffani's La liberta contenta presented by the CMS at Alice Tully Hall. He also was the featured performer in a 1979 BBC Television broadcast celebrating the 95th birthday of McCormack. Afterwards, White was hired to perform in six more specials for the BBC.

== 1980s ==
In 1980, White released a third album of Irish songs for RCA Victor, Danny Boy, and Other Irish Ballads; this time accompanied by a full orchestra. That same year, he appeared at the Spoleto Festival USA and returned to the Mostly Mozart Festival at Lincoln Center to perform Beethoven's folksong settings with the Borodin Trio. In 1981, he appeared in recital with soprano Beverly Hoch and pianist Marc Neikrug at Carnegie Hall performing settings of writings by Goethe. That same year, he appeared in the Chamber Music Society of Lincoln Center's performance of Igor Stravinsky's Renard under Michael Tilson Thomas at Avery Fisher Hall. In 1982 he was the tenor soloist in Bach's B minor Mass with the New York Choral Society under Robert De Cormier at Carnegie Hall. In March and April 1983, he undertook a sell-out tour of 23 concerts throughout Ireland under the title of "I Hear You Calling Me – Robert White Remembers John McCormack". Later that year, he performed on the final episode of the BBC show The Good Old Days; televised 24 December 1983, on which programme he made many appearances over the years.

In 1985, White performed William Schuman's Time to the Old for a concert honoring the composer's 75th birthday at Lincoln Center. That same year, he performed three concerts in honor of tenor John McCormack with violinist Mark Peskanov at Alice Tully Hall. He returned to Alice Tully Hall in 1987 to perform a recital of songs by Beethoven. Also in 1985, he was the featured soloist in a concert of songs by Stephen Foster with The New York Pops.

In 1988, White released another album, Favorite Irish Songs of Princess Grace, for Virgin Classics. That same year, he performed a recital of works by Friml, Romberg, Herbert, Hindemith, Korngold, Milhaud and Grainger with Samuel Sanders at Town Hall in Manhattan; and sang Benjamin Britten's song cycle Les Illuminations with the New York City Symphony. In 1989, he was the tenor soloist in Benjamin Britten's Serenade for Tenor, Horn and Strings, with the Fairfield Chamber Orchestra, and sang Beethoven's folk song settings at the Santa Fe Chamber Music Festival.

== 1990s–2026 ==
In 1991, White performed Vaughan Williams's Blake Songs at Weill Recital Hall with oboist Blair Tindall. In 1992, he performed songs by Benjamin Godard and Harold Craxton in a concert celebrating the 90th birthday of Alice Tully at Lincoln Center. In 1993, The New York Times recounted an entertaining story in which a bug flew into White's mouth during an outdoor concert at Wave Hill in Riverdale, the Bronx, while he was singing a song by Stephen Foster. White was quoted as saying "Just as I was going for a big high note, I felt myself swallow this bug. It went straight down, past the gag reflex. But I did let out the best high note of my career." That same year, he performed a recital of songs that all used text by James Joyce at the Juilliard School. In 1994, he was a feature soloist in a concert honoring philanthropist and opera singer Alice Tully, who was a close friend of White's, at Lincoln Center, along with the New York Philharmonic, soprano Jessye Norman, conductor James Levine, and other music luminaries.

In 1996, White performed in recital at the Festival dei Due Mondi, and was invited by Mayor Rudy Giuliani to perform two arias by Handel for a ceremony presenting Kitty Carlisle the Handel Medal by the City of New York. In 1997, he gave a concert of Renaissance music at the Metropolitan Museum of Art which featured works by composers John Dowland, Roland de Lassus, William Corkine, and John Bartlet. In 1998, he was a featured soloist in a concert honoring composer John Corigliano's 60th birthday at the 92nd Street Y, and performed a concert of works by Poulenc at the Music Festival of the Hamptons. In 1999, he performed in a memorial concert for his long time accompanist Samuel Sanders with whom he had performed since his days as an undergraduate student at Hunter College, and performed a concert of folksongs for Bargemusic.

In 2000, White performed a concert of Irish songs and ballads with the Westchester Chamber Orchestra, and another concert of works by Beethoven for Bargemusic. In 2001, he gave a recital at the Metropolitan Museum of Art featuring the world premieres of 19 art songs, including works by Mark Adamo, Milton Babbitt, William Bolcom, John Corigliano, Lukas Foss, Stephen Hough, Libby Larsen, Lowell Liebermann, Gian Carlo Menotti, Ben Moore, John Musto, Tobias Picker, Ned Rorem, William Jay Smith, David Del Tredici, and Brian Zeger; all of which were composed specifically for him. In 2002, he appeared in concert with pianist Wu Han and violist Paul Neubauer with Bargemusic. In 2004, he sang 'Danny Boy' for the closing of La Caravelle restaurant at the request of the owner. In 2006, he gave a recital at the Morgan Library & Museum entitled Music in the Time of J. P. Morgan.

In 2010, White performed with flutist Linda Chesis for two concerts with Bargemusic. In 2011, he performed a concert of Wartime songs with mezzo-soprano Joan Morris and pianist William Bolcom at the Metropolitan Museum of Art. In his review. The New York Times critic Zachary Woolfe wrote, "Mr. White's sweet tenor warmed up as the concert progressed, culminating in a series of intimate confessions that he delivered with expert, easy grace: perfectly wrought songs like It's Been a Long, Long Time, Long Ago and Far Away and I'll Be Seeing You. As Don't Sit Under the Apple Tree (With Anyone Else but Me) proved, Mr. White is also—good to know—a first-rate whistler."

White died in Manhattan, New York, of metastatic prostate cancer on March 17, 2026, at the age of 89. He left no immediate survivors.

== Other work as an educator and in media ==
White taught music history on the faculties of Hunter College and the Manhattan School of Music during the 1970s. He joined the faculty of the Juilliard School in 1991. In the 2000s, he worked as an interviewer of classical musicians for the radio station WQXR-FM. In 2001, he sat on a panel for an event honoring comedian Fred Allen at the Museum of Television and Radio. In 2002, he taught a masterclass with Barbara Cook at the Lincoln Center Festival entitled "Fyodor Chaliapin and the Silent Screen", which explored the way folk song has influenced art song.
