= Samuel Sanders =

- Born: June 27, 1937
- Origin: United States
- Died: July 9, 1999 (aged 62) New York Presbyterian Hospital
- Genres: Classical
- Instrument: Piano

Samuel Sanders (June 27, 1937 – July 9, 1999) was an American classical collaborative pianist and pedagogue.

== Biography ==
He was born with a congenital heart condition that required him to undergo surgery at the age of nine. His first piano teacher was Hedwig Kanner-Rosenthal.

He studied at Hunter College and later received a master's degree at the Juilliard School, where he studied solo piano with Irwin Freundlich and Martin Canin. While at Juilliard, he also studied accompanying with Sergius Kagen.

Samuel Sanders died from liver failure at New York Presbyterian Hospital in 1999. He was 62 and lived in Manhattan.

== Career and Honors ==
As a collaborative pianist, he worked with many important classical musicians including Joshua Bell, Håkan Hagegård, Yo-Yo Ma, Jessye Norman, Itzhak Perlman, Rachel Barton Pine, Leonard Rose, Beverly Sills, and Robert White.

With Perlman, he won two Grammy Awards in 1981 for "The Spanish Album" and "Music for Two Violins." With Chilean cellist Andrés Díaz, Sanders formed the Díaz-Sanders Duo.

Sanders was the founder and artistic director of the Cape and Islands Chamber Music Festival in Cape Cod, Massachusetts.

He received honorary doctorates from Lehman College and the St. Louis Conservatory of Music. He taught at the Juilliard School and the Peabody Institute, creating accompanying programs at both schools.
