= Two Boys =

Opera, USA, 2011

Two Boys is an opera in two acts by American composer Nico Muhly, with an English-language libretto by American playwright Craig Lucas. The opera's story is based on real events in Manchester, England, in 2003 as described in a 2005 Vanity Fair article titled "You Want Me 2 Kill Him?"

Muhly's opera was first performed by the English National Opera (ENO) in London on 24 June 2011, directed by Bartlett Sher. It was performed by the Metropolitan Opera in New York in October and November 2013. The ENO and the Met shared the initial production costs.

Using the narrative structure of a police investigation into a violent crime, the opera explores the world of online relationships and chatrooms, and was billed by the ENO as "a cautionary tale of the dark side of the internet."

Nonesuch Records released the first recording of the piece, from the Metropolitan Opera production, in 2014.

== Roles ==
Role	Voice type	Premiere cast, 24 June 2011 Conductor: Rumon Gamba	Metropolitan Opera premiere cast, 21 October 2013 Conductor: David Robertson
Detective Inspector Anne Strewson	mezzo-soprano	Susan Bickley	Alice Coote
Brian	tenor	Nicky Spence	Paul Appleby
Rebecca	soprano	Mary Bevan	Jennifer Zetlan
Jake (avatar)	baritone	Jonathan McGovern	Christopher Bolduc
Jake (real)	boy soprano	Joseph Beesley	Andrew Pulver
Fiona	mezzo-soprano	Heather Shipp	Sandra Piques Eddy
Anne's mother	mezzo-soprano	Valerie Reid	Judith Forst
Liam (Detective Constable)	tenor	Philip Daggett	Dennis Petersen
Peter	bass-baritone	Robert Gleadow	Keith Miller
Cynthia, Jake's mother	soprano	Anne-Clare Monk	Caitlin Lynch
Brian's mother	mezzo-soprano	Rebecca Stockland	Maria Zifchak
Brian's father	baritone	Paul Napier-Burrows	Kyle Pfortmiller
Doctor	bass	Michael Burke	Marco Nisticò
Celebrant	tenor	Geraint Hylton	Richard Cox
American Congressman	tenor	Anton Rich	Noah Baetge
American Congressional Page	tenor	Peter Kirk	Juan José León
American Suburban Girl	soprano	Eleanor Burke	Ashley Emerson
American Suburban moms	sopranos	Clare Mitcher, Claire Pendleton	Anne Nonnemacher, Maria D'Amato

== Reception ==
Two Boys opened to mixed reviews from the British press. William Hartstone in the Daily Express called it "thoroughly modern opera, both disturbing and challenging". Edward Seckerson writing in The Independent praised the composition, libretto and staging, calling it "an auspicious operatic debut."

George Hall, writing in The Stage, praised the libretto, but called Muhly's music "a commonplace and ultimately thin soundtrack accompaniment". Rupert Christiansen, writing in The Daily Telegraph, described it as "a bit of a bore – dreary and earnest rather than moving and gripping, and smartly derivative rather than distinctively individual". He continued, "It sounds more intriguing than it is, because Muhly signally fails to build the narrative into a sound melodramatic structure. Although the opera isn't long, it seems so, plodding along without substantial contrast of pace or mood, and never reaching a satisfactory climax."

In the New York Times, Zachary Woolfe wrote: "Serious and radiant, Two Boys is a landmark in the career of an important artist. Confidently staking his claim to the operatic tradition, Mr. Muhly has added to it a work of dark beauty." The Bloomberg review began by quoting Muhly's PR tagline as "the hottest composer on the planet", concluding "Whichever planet that is, it must be a pretty tepid one." The review also faulted the libretto, which "moves with such exasperating slowness, that if the audience hasn't worked things out by Act II, then they're probably asleep or sensibly diverting their mental energy elsewhere." The opera elicited unkind comparisons to police procedurals on TV. The Independent dismissed it as "Prime Suspect with a soundtrack of semi-skimmed Glass." In The Guardian, which has frequently commissioned guest columns from Muhly, Andrew Clements dismissed the opera as "a bland mid-Atlantic compromise" with a musical idiom "pitched somewhere between recent Philip Glass and the John Adams of The Death of Klinghoffer." Writing in The Londonist, Sam Smith concurred, "Muhly's music...is interesting but can feel underwhelming and derivative." So So Gay panned the production as "an operatic misadventure" and "a dreary letdown", and agreeing that the music "is minimalist to the point of being unexciting". In The Financial Times, Andrew Clark felt the opera was underwhelming and that "the fault lies in Muhly's generic minimalism. The orchestral accompaniment, rarely breaking out of a steady moderato, has the quality of a soundtrack. Vocal lines are singable but impersonal...'Accessible' hovers over every bar."

== Recording ==
Nonesuch Records released the first recording of Two Boys, from the Metropolitan Opera production, on September 30, 2014.
