= Adina (opera) =

Opera by Gioachino Rossini

- Farsa by Gioachino Rossini
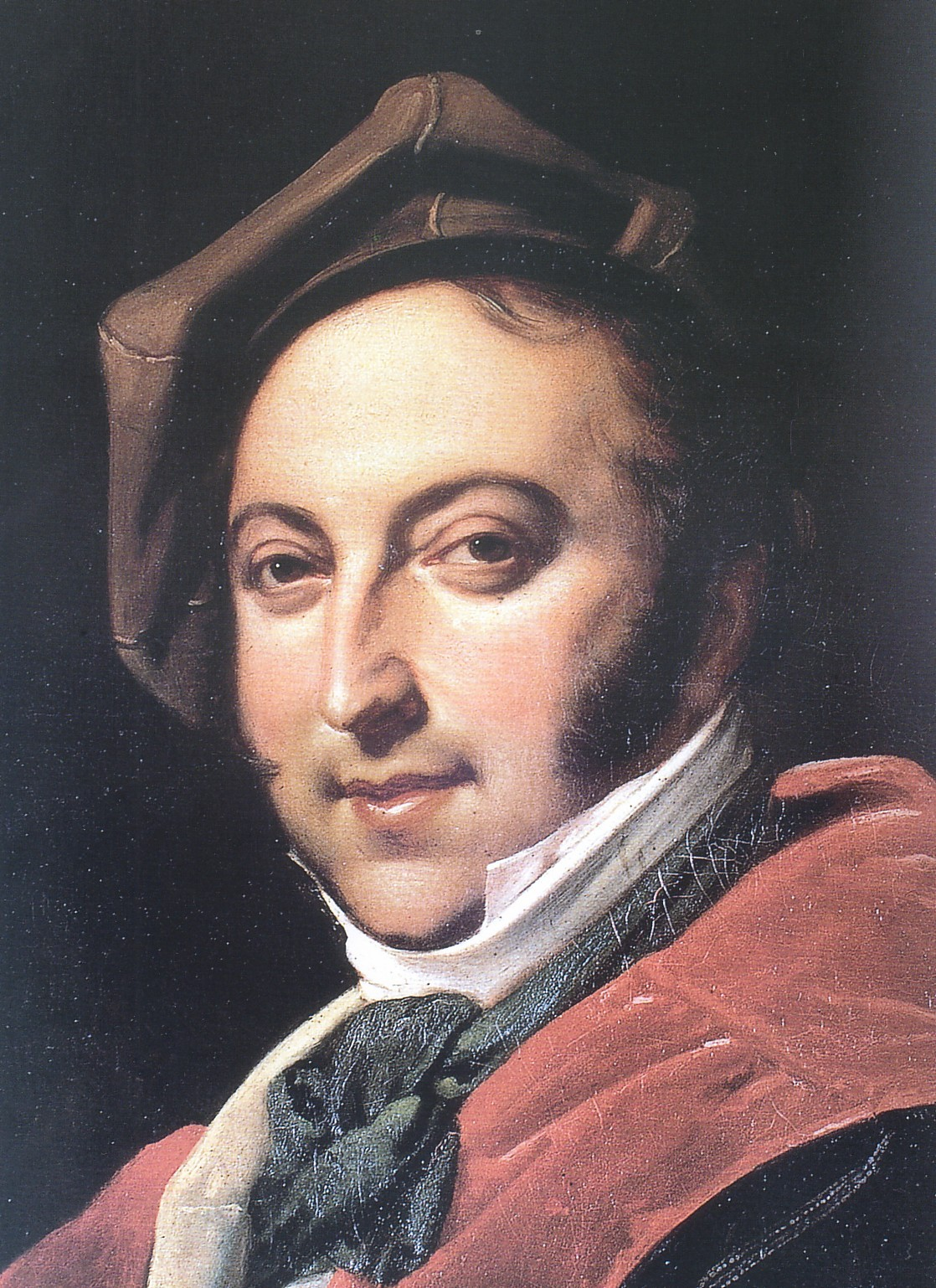
- Rossini c. 1820
- Librettist: Gherardo Bevilacqua-Aldobrandini
- Language: Italian
- Based on: Il califfo e la schiava, libretto by Felice Romani
- Premiere: 22 June 1826; Teatro Nacional de São Carlos, Lisbon

Adina is an operatic farsa in one act by Gioachino Rossini with a libretto by Marchese Gherardo Bevilacqua-Aldobrandini. The opera develops the popular theme of the "abduction from the seraglio". The première took place on 22 June 1826 at the Teatro Nacional de São Carlos, Lisbon.

== Composition history ==
Adina was commissioned in 1818 by Diego Ignazio de Pina Manique, police superintendent of Lisbon and inspector of Portuguese theatres. The opera was intended as a gift for a now unknown soprano who had apparently enthralled the superintendent with her performances at São Carlos.

The contract Rossini made was for a quick completion of the work, and the opera was finished in the same year it was commissioned. Rossini did not write an overture for the opera because none was specified in the contract, and indeed he took little interest in the project. The plot is very similar to that of Francesco Basili's 1819 opera, Il califfo e la schiava, for which the libretto was written by Felice Romani, and some passages occur in both librettos - a mystery which has not yet been unravelled. Not all of the music is entirely original. According to the 2001 critical edition of the score by Fabrizio della Seta, "Rossini composed anew only four of the work's nine numbers: the Introduction, the disarming Cavatina for Adina "Fragolette fortunate" (Lucky little strawberries), the Quartet, and the Finale; for three others he turned to the opera Sigismondo written in 1814; the remaining two were written by a collaborator."

== Performance history ==
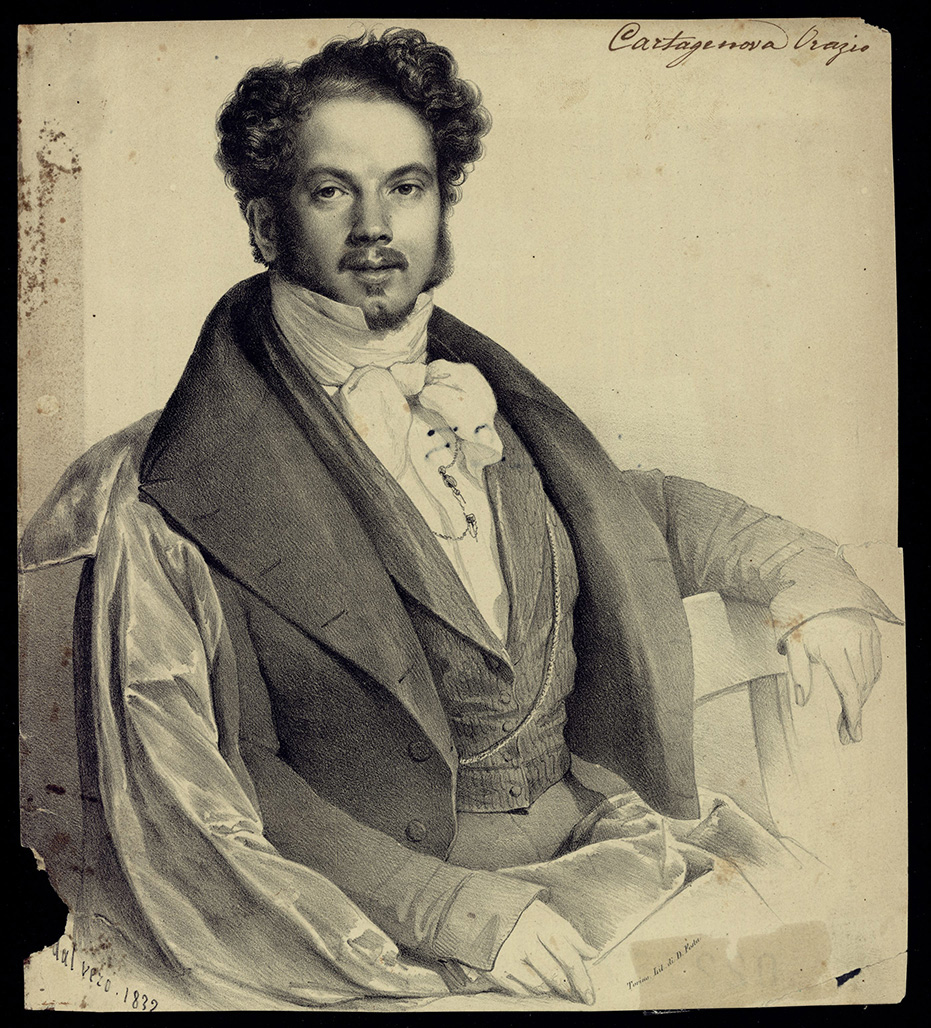
Giovanni Orazio Cartagenova, who created the role of The Caliph

There is no apparent explanation for the eight-year gap between its completion in 1818 and its first performance in 1826. It was not revived until 1963, when it was performed at the Accademia Chigiana of Siena. It was staged at the Rossini Opera Festival, Pesaro, Italy, in 2018, with Lisette Oropesa in the title role.

The music of Adina has been described as "somewhat more serious genre than might be expected for a one-act opera, especially one designated a farsa (perhaps better considered a semi-serious opera in the 'rescue' vein)" with the opera itself managing "to escape pure conventionality of archetypes and stereotypes and achieve a stylistic unity." Richard Osborne in his "Master Musicians: Rossini" describes Adina as not only "...a pen-and-ink sketch rather than a full scale drawing...", but also "...a winning reminder that he had not lost his old skill as a composer of farse."

== Roles ==
Role	Voice type	Premiere Cast, 22 June 1826 (Conductor: )
Adina, a slave-girl	soprano	Luisa Valesi
Selimo, her former lover	tenor	Luigi Ravaglia
The Caliph, the unknown father of Adina	bass	Giovanni Orazio Cartagenova
Ali, a young Arab	tenor	Gaspare Martinelli
Mustafa, gardener of the seraglio	bass	Filippo Spada
Male chorus
