= Elliot Madore =

Canadian opera singer

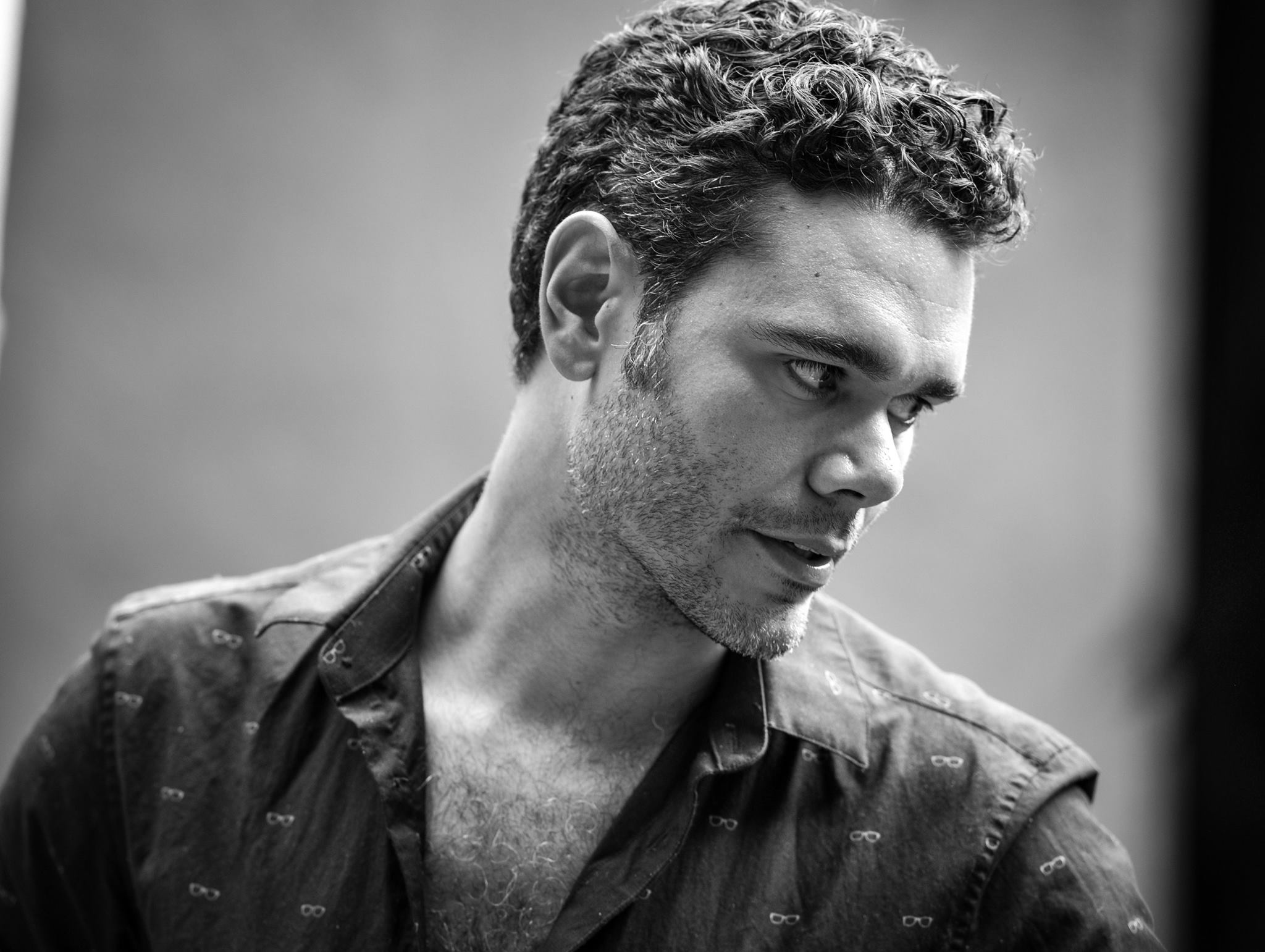
- Madore outside the Santa Fe Opera, August 2016
- Born: April 15, 1987 (age 39); Toronto, Ontario, Canada
- Education: Metropolitan Opera, Curtis Institute of Music
- Occupation: Operatic baritone
- Awards: Winner of the 2009 Palm Beach Vocal Competition (2009) *Winner of the Metropolitan Opera National Council Auditions (2010) *George London Award for best Canadian Singer (2010) *ARIAS Emerging Young Artist Award from Opera Canada (2010)
- Website: elliotmadore.com

Elliot Madore (born April 15, 1987) is a Canadian lyric baritone with an international operatic career.

== Early life and education ==
Madore graduated from the Metropolitan Opera's Lindemann Young Artist Development Program and received both his Master of Music degree in Opera and Bachelor of Music degree in Voice from the Curtis Institute of Music in Philadelphia.

== Career ==
In 2010, at the age of 22, he won the Metropolitan Opera National Council Auditions. He has since performed at the Metropolitan Opera, Zürich Opera House, San Francisco Opera, Glyndebourne Festival Opera, Bavarian State Opera, the Saito Kinen Festival Matsumoto and the Dutch National Opera. In December 2015 he sang the title role of Figaro in The Barber of Seville at the Metropolitan Opera. In September 2015 he made his San Francisco Opera debut singing Anthony in Sweeney Todd. As a member of the ensemble with Opernhaus Zürich (2012–2014), he appeared as Valentin in a new production of Faust, Guglielmo in Così fan tutte with Tomáš Netopil, Schaunard in La bohème conducted by Nello Santi, Andrei in a new production of Péter Eötvös' Tri sestry (Three Sisters), Silvio in Pagliacci, Silvano in Un ballo in maschera and Germano in La scala di seta. In 2016 he will return to the Metropolitan Opera singing the role of Mercutio in Roméo et Juliette which will be aired live in cinemas. Also in 2016 he will sing the title role of Pelléas in Pelléas et Mélisande with both the Cleveland Orchestra and at the Sydney Opera House. In 2017 season, he sang the role of Papageno in Scenes from The Magic Flute with the Los Angeles Philharmonic and returned to the San Francisco Opera singing the role of Ramon in the world premiere production of Girls of the Golden West. In 2018 season, he will sing the role of Le Chat in L'enfant et les sortilèges at Berlin Philharmonic. Also in the 2018 season, he returned to Opernhaus Zürich as Germano in La scala di seta and appeared as Pelléas in Pelléas et Mélisande at Deutsche Kammerphilharmonie Bremen. In 2018–2019, Elliot Madore returned to the Dutch National Opera in the European premiere of John Adams’ Girls of the Golden West directed by Peter Sellars, a role he premiered at the San Francisco Opera. He also returned to the Zurich Opera in a new production of Sweeney Todd as Anthony Hope and debuts as Figaro in Il barbiere di Siviglia at Manitoba Opera. He has performed Carmina Burana with the Kalamazoo Bach Festival, Kitchener–Waterloo Symphony, and Colorado Symphony having previously sung it with the Cleveland Orchestra.

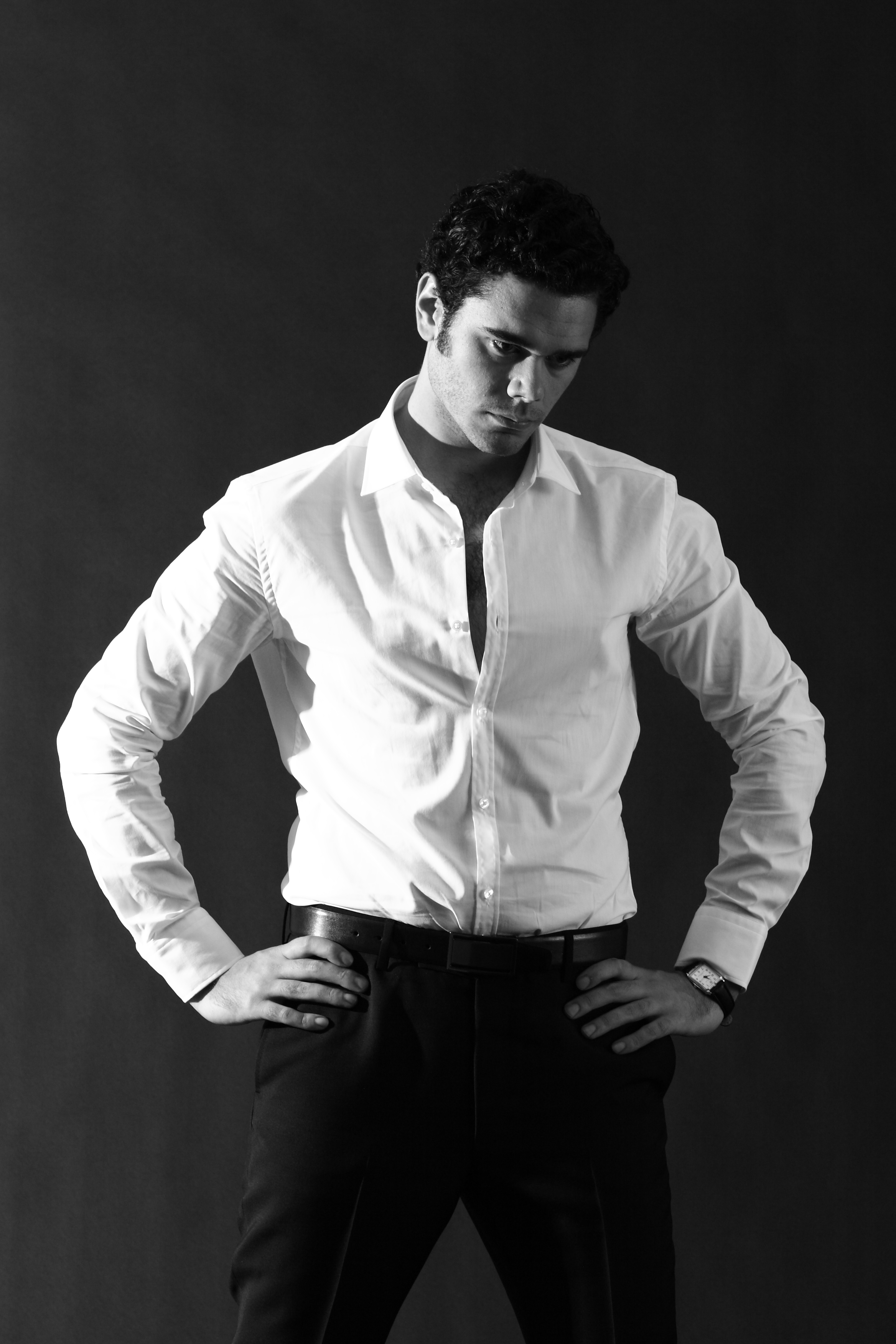

== Awards ==
In 2016 Madore won a Grammy Award singing the roles of Le chat and L'Horloge Comtoise in L'enfant et les sortilèges under the direction of Seiji Ozawa. His other awards include:

- 2009: Winner of the 2009 Palm Beach Vocal Competition
- 2010: Winner of the Metropolitan Opera National Council Auditions
- 2010: George London Award for best Canadian Singer
- 2010: ARIAS Emerging Young Artist Award from Opera Canada

== Repertoire (selection) ==
- Don Giovanni in Don Giovanni
- Guglielmo in Così fan tutte
- Belcore in L'elisir d'amore
- Valentin in Faust
- Figaro in The Barber of Seville
- Harlequin in Ariadne auf Naxos
- Schaunard in La bohème
- Silvio in Pagliacci
- Pelléas in Pelléas et Mélisande
- Papageno in Die Zauberflöte
- Andrej in Drei Schwestern
- Ramiro in L'heure espagnole
- Aeneas in Dido and Aeneas

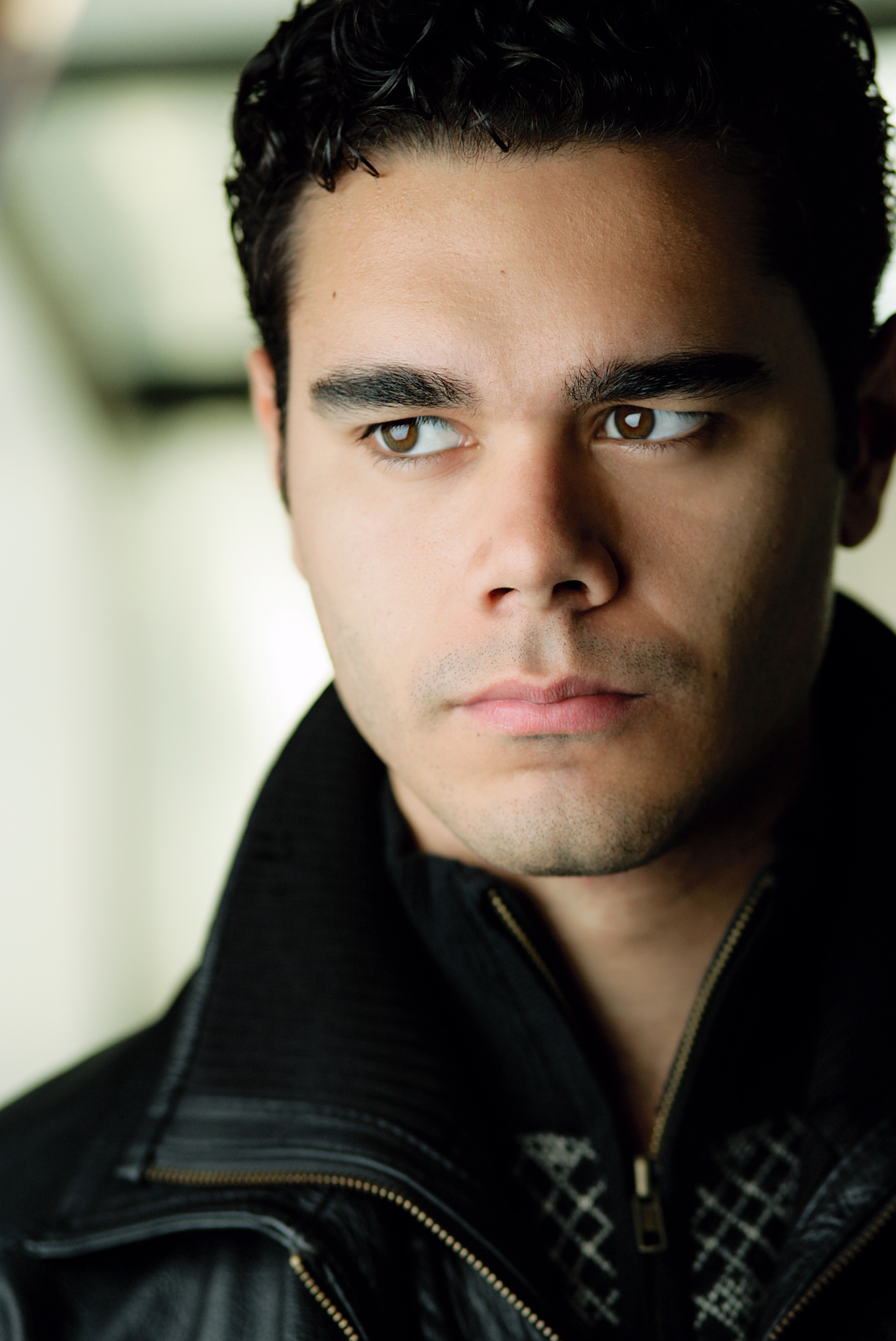

== Recordings ==
- Le chat and L'Horloge Comtoise in L'enfant et les sortilèges with conductor Seiji Ozawa, released 2015, Decca Classics.
- The Shoe Salesman in Postcard from Morocco with conductor Rossen Milanov, released 2009, Albany Records.

== DVDs ==
- Ramiro in L'heure espagnole and L'Horloge Comtoise and Le chat with Kazushi Ono conducting, released 2013, Fra Musica.
- Lysander in The Enchanted Island with William Christie conducting, released 2012, Virgin Classics.
