= Joseph White (tenor) =

American opera singer

Joseph M. White (October 14, 1891 – February 28, 1959) was an Irish-American tenor.

== Biography ==
Joseph M(alachy) White was born in New York City as the grandson of an Irish emigrant born in Dublin in 1820. Joseph White displayed an early talent for singing and made his first recordings in 1915. His main voice teacher from about 1920 was E. Presson Miller, a well-known private teacher who lived and worked in the Carnegie Hall building, New York.

From 1925, White took part in a radio show sponsored by the tire company B.F. Goodrich for its Silvertown cord tires, which featured a 'Goodrich Silvertown Orchestra' and an unnamed tenor wearing a silver mask across his eyes. Intended for advertising, the show drew a large number of listeners who were asked to guess his identity, which was not revealed until 1930. He then performed as "Joseph M. White, Radio's 'Silver-Masked Tenor'", making numerous recordings. His repertory largely consisted of well-known Irish songs from traditional sources and light contemporary ballads, and this regard resembled much of the recorded repertoire of John McCormack. In 1943, as White was preparing for a comeback on radio, he slipped on a wet floor and broke his left leg, which was then amputated.

White's son Robert "Bobby" White became a well-known tenor as well, often performing a similar repertoire as his father. Robert White was taught by his father to sing McCormack's repertoire. He died on February 28, 1959, age 67.
