= Girls of the Golden West (opera) =

2017 opera by John Adams

- Opera by John Adams
- Librettist: Peter Sellars
- Language: English
- Based on: Letters by Louise Clappe
- Premiere: November 21, 2017; San Francisco Opera

Girls of the Golden West is an opera in two acts with music by John Adams and a libretto by Peter Sellars. The San Francisco Opera commissioned the work jointly with Dallas Opera, the Dutch National Opera (De Nationale Opera) and Teatro La Fenice in Venice. The opera was premiered in San Francisco on November 21, 2017. The running time is 160 minutes.

== Composition history ==
The opera is inspired by the 1851/1852 letters of Louise Clappe, who lived for a year and a half in the mining settlement of Rich Bar (now Diamondville, California) during the California Gold Rush. Clappe published the letters under the pen name Dame Shirley. The libretto is also sourced from other literature of the period, including newspaper articles and the writings of Mark Twain. Adams wrote, "To be able to set to music the authentic voices of these people, whether from their letters or their songs or from newspaper accounts from their time, is a great privilege for me." Sellars, who also directed the opera, conceived the libretto while doing research for a production of Giacomo Puccini's 1910 opera La fanciulla del West (based on David Belasco's 1905 play The Girl of the Golden West), which also deals with the gold rush period. According to Sellars, "These true stories of the Forty-Niners are overwhelming in their heroism, passion and cruelty, telling tales of racial conflicts, colorful and humorous exploits, political strife and struggles to build anew a life and to decide what it would mean to be American."

Sellars's previous collaborations with Adams have included premiere productions of Nixon in China, The Death of Klinghoffer and Doctor Atomic (for which Sellars also wrote the libretto).

== Roles ==
Role	Voice type	Premiere cast, 21 November - 10 December 2017 (Conductor: Grant Gershon)	European Premiere cast, 28 February - 17 March 2019 (Conductor: Grant Gershon)	Los Angeles Premiere Cast, 27 & 29 January 2023 (Conductor: John Adams)
Dame Shirley	soprano	Julia Bullock	Julia Bullock	Julia Bullock
Ned Peters	bass-baritone	Davóne Tines	Davóne Tines	Davóne Tines
Joe Cannon	tenor	Paul Appleby	Paul Appleby (Lucas van Lierop March 13 & 17)	Paul Appleby
Ah Sing	soprano	Hye Jung Lee	Hye Jung Lee	Hye Jung Lee
Clarence	bass-baritone	Ryan McKinny	Ryan McKinny	Ryan McKinny
Josefa Segovia	mezzo-soprano	J'Nai Bridges	J'Nai Bridges	Daniela Mack
Ramón	baritone	Elliot Madore	Elliot Madore	Elliot Madore
Lola Montez	dancer	Lorena Feijóo		
Fayette	actor	Kai Brothers	Carlos García Estévez	
Chorus of Miners	Chorus of Male Voices	San Francisco Opera Chorus	Dutch National Opera Chorus	Los Angeles Master Chorale

== Recording ==
In January 2023 two live performances of the opera, performed at Walt Disney Concert Hall and conducted by the composer were recorded for Nonesuch Records, and were released in April 2024.
