= Lisette Oropesa =

American operatic soprano (born 1983)

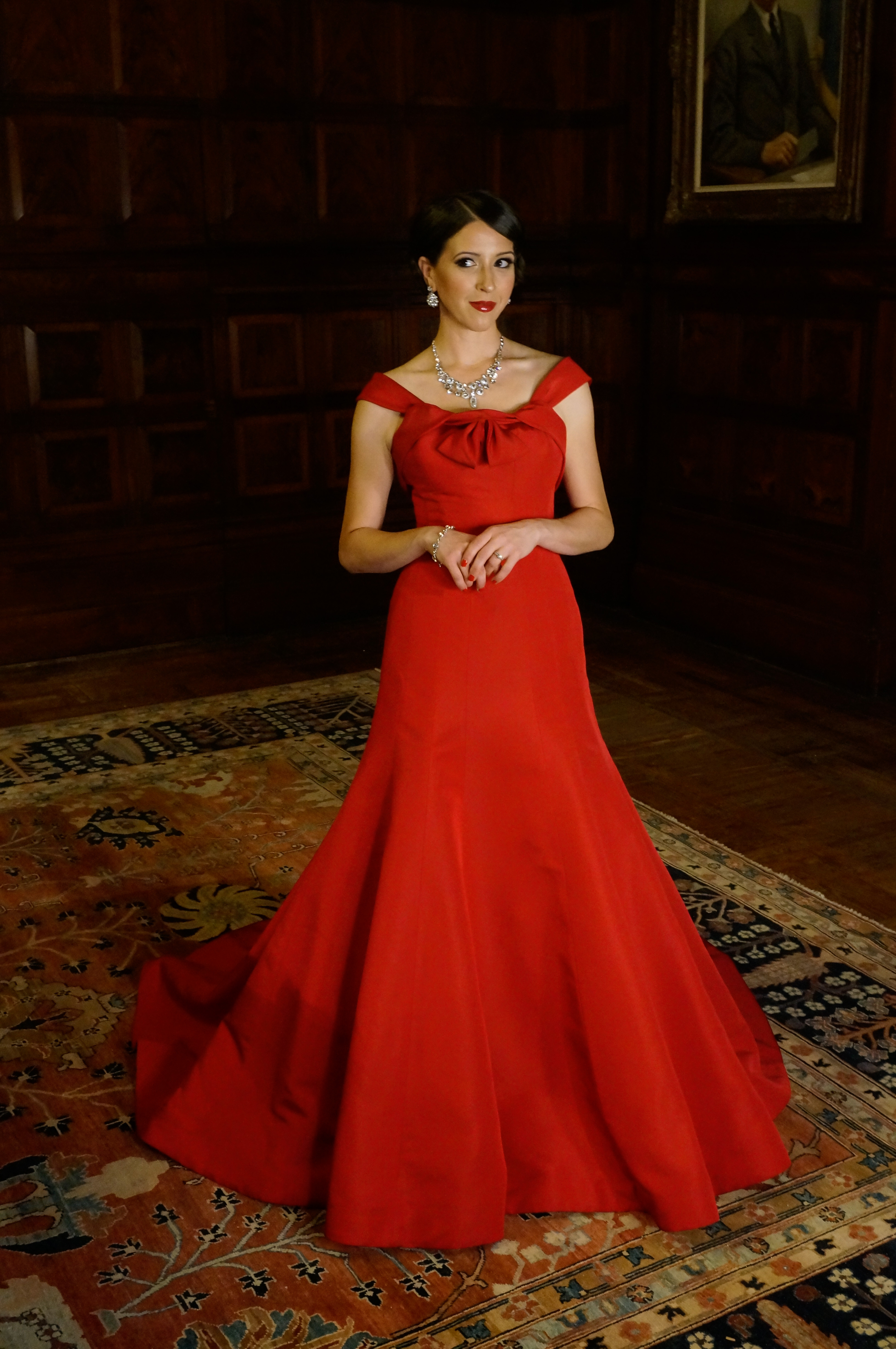
- Oropesa in 2016

Background information
- Born: September 29, 1983 (age 43); New Orleans, Louisiana, U.S.
- Genre: Opera
- Occupation: Opera singer (soprano)
- Years active: 2005–present
- Website: lisetteoropesa.com

Lisette Oropesa (born September 29, 1983) is an American operatic soprano of Cuban ancestry. Her repertoire includes works from Gluck, Handel, Mozart, Rossini, Donizetti, Wagner, Verdi, Bizet, Massenet, Bellini and Puccini. With her lyric coloratura soprano voice, she has performed roles in her native Spanish and English, as well as German, French and Italian. She is particularly noted in the roles of Susanna, Gilda, Konstanze, Lucia, Manon, Violetta, and Elvira.

Oropesa is a vegan, and a runner and marathoner who has been featured in Runner's World Magazine. In 2014, she co-contributed to Running, Eating, Thinking: A Vegan Anthology by Martin Rowe, where she talked about her weight loss and how she now follows a plant-based diet.

In 2015, she was a contributor to Master Singers: Advice from the Stage which includes interviews with opera singers about "analysis and awareness of their technique, art, interpretation and stagecraft".

== Early life and education ==
Oropesa was born in New Orleans, Louisiana, and raised in Baton Rouge, Louisiana. Her parents emigrated from Cuba.

She originally studied to be a flautist before her mother, a music teacher and former operatic soprano, suggested she audition for the voice faculty at the Louisiana State University School of Music. She joined the voice program under the guidance of Robert Grayson who was the chair of the Voice/Opera at the LSU School of Music.

== Career ==
=== Beginnings ===
Oropesa was a grand finals winner of the National Council Grand Finals at the Metropolitan Opera in 2005 and joined the Met's Lindemann Young Artists Development Program, graduating in 2008. She made her Met debut in a small role in Jean-Pierre Ponnelle's production of Idomeneo, conducted by James Levine in September 2006, and then sang First Lay-Sister in their new production of Suor Angelica.

As substitute, she sang her first leading role at the Metropolitan Opera, appearing as Susanna in five performances of Sir Jonathan Miller's production of The Marriage of Figaro opposite Erwin Schrott's Figaro in October 2007.

=== Work at the Met ===
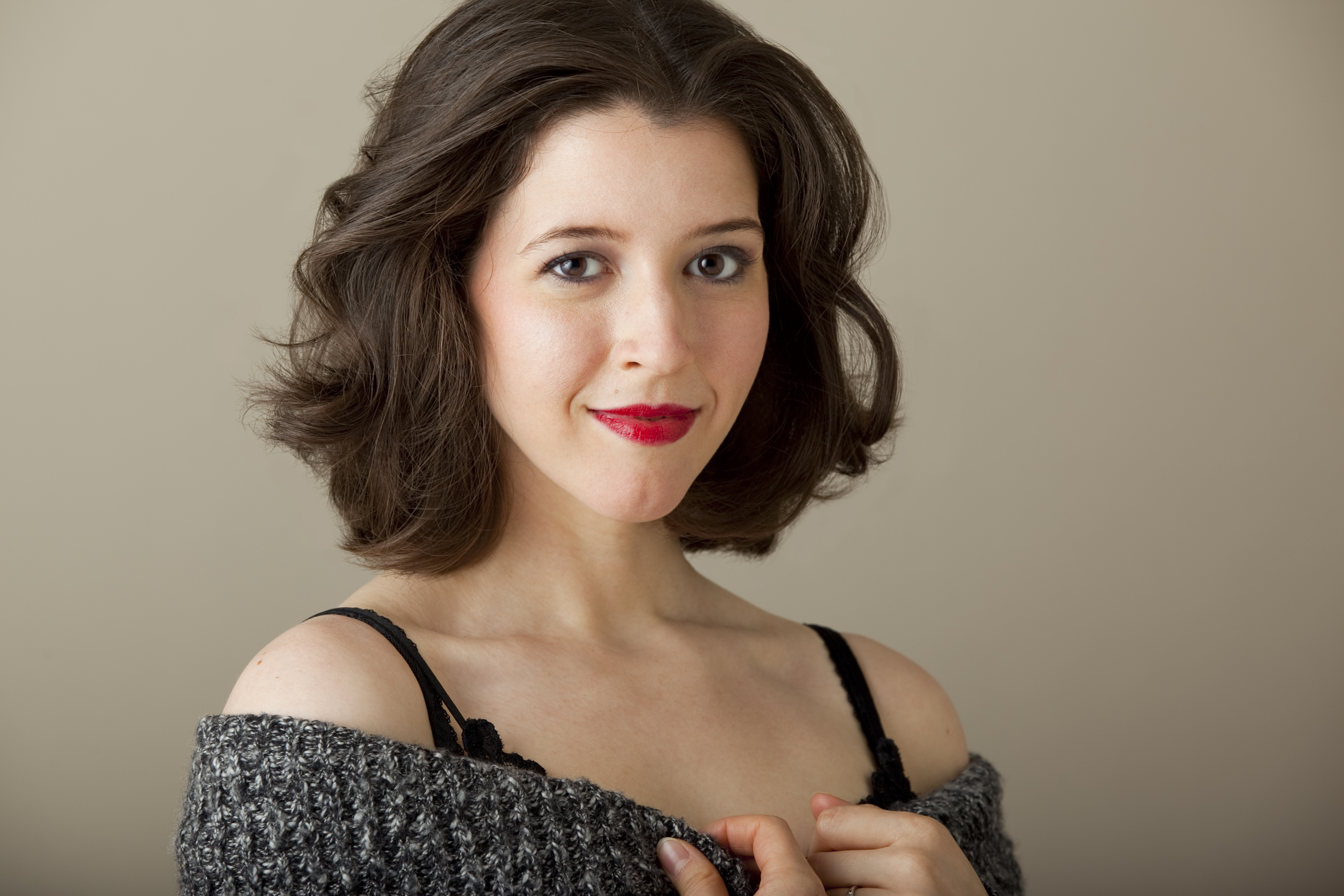
Oropesa in 2011

In the 2007–08 season, Oropesa was seen in the Met's Hansel and Gretel as the Dew Fairy and, in the 2008–09 season, in the role of Lisette in La rondine. She also sang the role of the Rhinemaiden, Woglinde, in the Met's 2009 Der Ring des Nibelungen, and additionally sang the off-stage role of the Woodbird in Siegfried.

In September 2010, she reprised her Rhinemaiden in the Met's season-opening production of Das Rheingold, for which won a Grammy Award for Best Opera Recording in 2012. In May 2011, she sang the part of the god Amor in Mark Morris's production of Orfeo ed Euridice. In December 2011, she created the role of Miranda in the Met's baroque pastiche, The Enchanted Island, singing opposite Plácido Domingo, and conducted by William Christie.

The end of the 2012–13 season culminated with her singing as Gilda in Rigoletto and as the Waldvogel in Siegfried where she was well received in both productions: "Her pure, smooth soprano and alert presence were both endearing" "...including the bright yellow Forest Bird, beautifully sung from offstage by Lisette Oropesa".

The end of 2013 saw an opening of a new production of Falstaff at the Met, conducted by Levine. According to The New York Times, "[with the role of Nannetta], the winning soprano Lisette Oropesa, sings with effortless grace and lyrical bloom".

In 2014, she starred alongside Jonas Kaufmann and Sophie Koch in the new production of Werther directed by Richard Eyre. The New York Times noted that "The bright-voiced, impressive soprano Lisette Oropesa is a sunny, winning Sophie."

At the beginning of 2016, Oropesa gave her first NYC solo recital with the Park Avenue Armory. According to Anthony Tommasini of The New York Times, she "gave a rewarding performance" and "brought uncommon freshness to this music".

Oropesa returned to the Met in late 2017 as Gretel in Hansel and Gretel in which "she was fully committed to arguably the most demanding of roles in this particular opera".

In 2019, she debuted in the title role of Manon, which was hailed by The New York Times: "Lisette Oropesa's performance in Massenet's opera at the Met is alone worth the price of admission."

In 2020, she returned to the Met for her second title role of the season, Giuseppe Verdi's La traviata. Her performance was praised in The New York Times: "...combining exquisite singing, youthful allure, affecting vulnerability and, by the end, bleak intensity, Ms. Oropesa emerged on Wednesday as a major Violetta". On March 1, she hosted the Metropolitan Opera National Council Auditions and gave a donation of $25,000, ensuring each contestant received $20,000 and raising the prize money for the first time in over 20 years. She was subsequently named National Advisor to the MONC for her contributions. She also hosted the Metropolitan Opera Live in HD transmission of Der fliegende Holländer, which was a scratch taping of the performance. The original HD was canceled due to the pandemic but later telecast as part of the PBS Great Performances series and is available for streaming at Met Opera on Demand.

And the end of 2025, Lisette opened a new production of I puritani at the Met, the first new production in 50 years. She was praised by the New York Times as "she so clearly articulated each pitch down the scale, it was like listening to someone run their fingers across the keys of a piano." On March 22, she also hosted the Metropolitan Opera Eric and Dominique Laffont Competition for the second time. She also hosted the Live in HD Performances of Andrea Chénier on Dec 13th 2025 and Tristan und Isolde on March 21, 2026. In 2026, Lisette returned to the Met to perform Violetta in La traviata, where she was described as "one of the best sopranos today" by OperaWire.

=== Performances elsewhere ===
Oropesa has appeared with the Welsh National Opera as Konstanze in Die Entführung aus dem Serail; with the Deutsche Oper am Rhein in Il turco in Italia; at the Tanglewood Music Festival as Konstanze; at the Ravinia Festival as Susanna in The Marriage of Figaro, conducted by James Conlon; for Opera New Jersey as Lucia in Lucia di Lammermoor; at Arizona Opera as Gilda in Rigoletto; and at the New Orleans Opera as Gilda and as Leïla in Les pêcheurs de perles.

In April and May 2012, Oropesa appeared with the Pittsburgh Opera as Konstanze in a production of Die Entführung aus dem Serail set on the Orient Express in the Pasha's private train car. In October 2012, she again performed the role of Lucia with the Arizona Opera. In November, she performed the role of Cleopatra in Michigan Opera Theatre's Giulio Cesare.

In 2013, she sang the role of Pamina in The Magic Flute at the Florida Grand Opera and reviews were universally positive: "Oropesa was beyond fantastic in her portrayal of Pamina." "Her aria 'Ach, ich fühl's', sung as she believes Tamino no longer loves her, was genuinely moving ..." In the summer, Oropesa sang The Marriage of Figaro at the Santa Fe Opera: "Nothing in the evening surpassed her rendition of "Deh vieni, non tardar" in act 4, in which she spun strands of magic in the evening air" noted critic James Keller. Later in 2013, she sang the role of Amalia at the Washington Concert Opera for Verdi's I Masnadieri in which she "achieved total triumph as Amalia, the trill-filled part created for Jenny Lind." She was also called in as a last minute replacement for Nannetta in San Francisco Opera's Falstaff.

After her performances at the Met in early 2014, Oropesa's summer schedule included many concerts. These included Haydn's The Creation in New York and in Cleveland; the St Matthew Passion in Chicago; Die Entführung aus dem Serail in Bellingham, Washington; and a reprise of her 2010 performance in The Marriage of Figaro at Ravinia Festival. Other opera engagements included Nannetta at the Dutch National Opera; Gilda at Grand Théâtre de Genève; and Konstanze at the Bavarian State Opera. Her last performance of 2014 was her debut at the Los Angeles Opera as Rosalba in Daniel Catán's Florencia en el Amazonas.

In 2015, she started the year at the Paris Opera as Konstanze. According to one review, she sang "Marten aller Arten" with "incisive accents and passionate acting". Her next performance was at the Concertgebouw where she received a standing ovation for her rendition of "Caro Nome" in a recorded radio performance of Rigoletto. She returned home to New Orleans to again sing Susanna. According to The New Orleans Advocate, she "offered a fine display of vocal versatility, from the lilting coloratura of a young woman in love to the confusion and anger of the object of the lascivious intentions of her overlord, Count Almaviva". She then went on debut in La fille du régiment at the Pittsburgh Opera. "Oropesa's Marie lacked neither virtuosity nor personality. With solid high notes, accurate coloratura and an endless supply of golden-age trills (I stopped counting after five), this endearing artist ran a vocal marathon that might have paralleled the physical feat she was preparing to run in Pittsburgh Marathon the next morning". Her next engagement was with the San Francisco Opera in The Marriage of Figaro. A review wrote, "Oropesa is a charming Susanna. Her voice has a gorgeous delicate quality to it but still has volume. Her "Deh vieni, non tardar" was unstrained and she managed to do a perfect martial arts flip of Figaro when she loses her temper with him later in the act". She went onto another extremely successful debut in La traviata at the Philadelphia Opera "Oropesa manifested secure technical chops—trills, staccati, pinpoint dynamics and—most impressively—a long, sustained line that allowed her to hold the audience breathless in both "Dite alla giovine" and the party scene ensembles". In November, she was brought in for nearly back to back performances of Rigoletto and Die Entführung aus dem Serail with the Bavarian State Opera due to cancellations. She then finished the year with a performance of Rigoletto with the Teatro Real in Madrid in which she was a "Triumph".

In 2016, Oropesa performed many concert works, starting in Rome at the Accademia Nazionale di Santa Cecilia with Fauré's Requiem, she then went to Baltimore to sing with Eric Owens in the Ein deutsches Requiem. Next, she performed Mahler's Symphony No. 8 with Yannick Nézet-Séguin and the Philadelphia Orchestra. Her next concert was in Cincinnati with James Conlon in his last season with the Cincinnati May Festival. She was then found in Munich performing for the UniCredit Festspielnacht. Her next operatic role was a brand new production of Les Indes galantes with the Bavarian State Opera to which she performed to acclaim. "Makellos die Solisten: Herausragend agieren – in edlen Kantilenen und rasanten Koloraturen – Lisette Oropesa". She then returned stateside to Washington, D.C., where she reprised her role as Susanna for the Washington National Opera in The Marriage of Figaro. With a quick stop to Dallas to sing with the Dallas Symphony Orchestra in Ein deutsches Requiem, she was back in Washington, D.C., to perform as Marie in La fille du régiment again with the Washington National Opera. This time, her stage partner was Supreme Court Justice, Ruth Bader Ginsburg. According to Arnold Saltzman, Oropesa "sang flawless runs and coloratura, acted in the humorous tradition of Carol Burnett, moved like a prima ballerina, and used vocal coloring for best emotional effect. Her pianissimo, crescendo and decrescendo were breathtaking." Oropesa finished off the year, returning to Rome to debut at the Teatro dell'Opera di Roma to perform in Rigoletto.

In 2017, she started her year at the Lausanne Opera, performing her first Ophélie in Hamlet. Jacques Schmitt from ResMusica wrote, "She does not have the stratospheric highs that Natalie Dessay had (who will ever have them?). She does not have her theatrical madness either. And yet, with "her" Ophélie, she offers a voice and theatrical character that is overwhelming with love, despair, ingenuity and authenticity as it is rare to see and hear." She then went to Washington, D.C., to perform in recital, which was highly praised. "The evening opened with "Ragion nell'alma siede," an aria from Haydn's opera Il mondo della luna. It was a gutsy move, and Oropesa easily filled the smaller venue with sound. The accuracy during runs was striking, as were the highest notes, all produced with facility. Her tone turned especially limpid on the little cadenza." This performance was recorded on video and was released to YouTube, culminating into the creation of her first album titled Within/Without. Next, she was in Munich for a performance of Die Entführung aus dem Serail with the Bavarian State Opera, making it her fourth year in a row of performing this role there. She then went on to perform a new production of Rigoletto at the Dutch National Opera directed by Damiano Michieletto, in this well-reviewed production, she was noted as being "Slender and graceful, soprano Lisette Oropesa was simply world-class as Gilda, with flawless emission and generous top notes, crystalline up to high E. The long trill at the end of "Caro nome" would have traced a perfect zigzag on a pitch visualiser. Even more stunning than her bravura was the melting glow at the centre of her voice, her morbidezza (softness)." Shortly after, she stepped in for two performances of Rigoletto at the Paris Opera, filling in for an ailing singer. She was reported to have received a standing ovation for her interpretation. She spent the summer debuting the role of Norina in Don Pasquale at Glyndebourne where she received accolades in the role. She was next heard in Paris for a concert of Falstaff with the Orchestre de Paris where she announced it would be the last performance of Nannetta she will sing. She then went on to debut at the Royal Opera House in the title role of Lucia di Lammermoor. She was given universally rave reviews for her interpretation. "Lucia is her first Royal Opera role, and the Cuban-American soprano is sensationally good."

In 2018, Oropesa returned to the Bavarian State Opera to perform her signature role as Konstanze in Die Entführung aus dem Serail for the fourth year in a row. Next, she gave a recital for the Tucson Desert Song Festival where she performed a brand new recital set and released her first music video "Adieux de l'hôtesse arabe", a Georges Bizet composition based on a poem by Victor Hugo. From this recital, Oropesa digitally released her second album entitled, "Aux filles du désert". Next, she performed in a new production of Orfeo ed Euridice by John Neumeier and the Joffrey Ballet at the Los Angeles Opera. Oropesa "moved across the stage like a phantom presence" according to LA Weekly. She once again returned to the Los Angeles Opera to perform her signature role as Gilda in Rigoletto, "Her "Caro nome" was a veritable how-to manual on holding an audience enraptured". Oropesa then went to the Teatro Real in Madrid to perform in Lucia di Lammermoor where she received "enormous" standing ovations for her interpretation of the role. During the summer, she debuted at the Rossini Opera Festival in Rossini's Adina which was also a role debut for her. She was "Considered by many to be this year's revelation of the ROF.". The day before her second performance of Adina, she sang her first ever solo concert with orchestra with the Philharmonic Gioachino Rossini. Her concert was hailed as "One of the most memorable concerts in the 39 year history of the Rossini Opera Festival." In September, Oropesa replaced Diana Damrau, who withdrew due to illness, as Marguerite de Valois at the Paris Opera in the company's new production of Les Huguenots where she "comprehensively conquered the hearts of the Paris audience." The day after her final performance of Les Huguenots, she premiered another new role of Adina in L'elisir d'amore with a "Timbre ardent, projection homogène sur toute la tessiture, vocalises agiles, aigus scintillants." She then opened the season at the Teatro dell'Opera di Roma in a new production of Rigoletto. For her performance she was hailed as being "perfetta la Gilda".

In 2019, Oropesa returned to her hometown of Baton Rouge, Louisiana to give a concert with Paul Groves called "A Starry Night with Lisette Oropesa" which was recorded for broadcast on Louisiana Public Broadcasting. She then went to Barcelona to perform in Rodelinda. She was lauded for her performances with "sylistic mastery", "technique without weaknesses", and "spectacular coloratura." She went on singing in a concert version of Robert le Diable at La Monnaie in Brussels. She then returned to the United States to perform in Don Pasquale with the Pittsburgh Opera to great acclaim, having a voice "So sublimely expressive that they stand out like a Michelangelo fresco in a black and white film." In June, Oropesa made her debut at the Teatro alla Scala in a new production of I masnadieri with an "Excellent debut for someone who has long been a guarantee throughout the world" In November, Oropesa returned to the Washington Concert Opera to perform Hamlet where she "melded dramatic sensitivity with a clean, pearly soprano."

In 2020, Oropesa was set to debut the role of Rosina in The Barber of Seville at the Paris Opera; however, six of her performances were cancelled due to the ongoing 2019–20 French pension reform strike. Once she was able to perform, she was rewarded in the press for a "brilliant voice, the treble easy, the vocalizations are perfectly executed and the line of song decorated with subtlety. An accomplished actress..." After the impasse caused by the COVID-19, she returned to the Teatro Real in Madrid to perform the role of Violetta Valéry in La traviata. On July 28, she was the first woman at this theatre to perform a solo encore by performing the traditionally cut second verse of the aria "Addio del passato". On August 10, Oropesa announced the signing of a five-year contract with the San Francisco Classical Recording Company along with a Mozart concert aria album with Il Pomo d'Oro. On August 14, she returned to the Arena di Verona to perform in a socially distanced Rossini Concert where she was "a triumph of belcanto as an elegance of the line, in a coloratura of supreme abstraction and captivating precision". Oropesa returned to the Royal Opera House to perform in a benefit livestream concert that marked the reopening of the ROH for the first time in nearly seven months. In October, she made her debut at the Vienna State Opera in Die Entführung aus dem Serail in a production by Hans Neuenfels. She was regarded as a "World class Konstanze" by the Kurier. At the Teatro alla Scala she was slated to open the season on December 7 in Lucia di Lammermoor, but the performances were canceled due to lockdowns in Italy. She was invited to perform for the opening of La Scala on December 7 in "A riveder le stelle" where she performed "Regnava nel silenzio" from Lucia di Lammermoor in the original key wearing a Giorgio Armani Privé gown. Her last performances of 2020 were at the Liceu in Barcelona in La traviata.

Her 2021 year started with a performance with the Bilbao Opera in a recital that was an "unmitigated success". In April, she starred in a movie production of La traviata by the Teatro dell'Opera di Roma which was viewed by over a million people when it was aired on primetime Rai 3 in Italy. She also performed at the Accademia Nazionale di Santa Cecilia in a bel canto concert performance with Sir Antonio Pappano. On May 7, Oropesa released her first album with orchestra on the Pentatone label, titled, Ombra Compagna, Gramophone wrote, "Oropesa's vocal finesse and dramatic insight make this a debut recital of rare pedigree." On September 13, she opened the season at the Royal Opera House in London with a new production of Rigoletto, which won rave reviews, The Guardian writing "Oropesa makes a matchless Gilda, singing with an extraordinary beauty of tone and understated depth of feeling: this really is one of the truly great performances." In October, Oropesa revived the Richard Eyre production of La traviata at the Royal Opera House. Her performance was "Without a doubt she is one of the finest, most complete Violettas to grace this staging in its almost 30 year history." In November, she went on a five-city, five-country tour of Theodora with Joyce DiDonato and the Il Pomo d'Oro orchestra. At the Teatro alla Scala, she had "overwhelming expressiveness" in the part. In December, she returned to Spain to perform two zarzuela recitals, for which, according to Codalario, "reaped one of the greatest successes we have witnessed at the Teatro de la Zarzuela".

At the start of 2022, Oropesa debuted her first Bellini role, I Capuleti e i Montecchi, at the Teatro alla Scala. She was universally praised with a "miracle of filati and variations, with spotless high notes." She then went on to give two lieder recitals, one in Valencia, Spain and the other in Vienna, Austria. The press saying "And generous and great is also her interpretive level, since the soprano is the owner of an instrument, and of knowledge, typical of the best." She then reprised her role as Konstanze at the Vienna State Opera and also jumped in at the last minute as Gilda there with the Viennese press saying "Her voice, in the softly bedded middle register, hinted at a gentle melancholy reminiscent of operatic times long gone." Lisette then had an anticipated return to the Teatro Real to perform an all French language concert with many of the pieces being from an upcoming album. The critics said "Lisette Oropesa is a very notable artist, who has an abundant and rich lyrical soprano voice that she handles with mastery and skill." She then went on to sing the Lucia mad scene at the Gran Teatre del Liceu's 175th Anniversary Gala where she was greeted with an over three minute ovation for her interpretation. She then returned to the Vienna State Opera to sing as Lucia in Lucia di Lammermoor where her "technique is astonishing and she was in absolute command." On May 27, her new "La traviata" album was released by Pentatone. At the same time, she was debuting at the Zürich Opera House in Lucia in an "electrifying interpretation". In August, Oropesa returned to the Arena di Verona to perform as La traviata and sing a concert of Carmina Burana where she was in "full control of her instrument". In late August, she debuted at the Salzburg Festival in Lucia di Lammermoor, where it was the first time that Lucia was ever performed there. Later in September, she made a double debut, one for I puritani and one at the Teatro di San Carlo with a "compendium of vocal technique, an essay on bel canto aesthetics". On September 30, she released her 5th album, Rossini & Donizetti: French Bel Canto Arias According to Gramophone, "her sense of line often flawless, text, character and emotions exactingly conveyed". On October 30 she released her 6th album, Handel's Theodora. In November, she returned to the Royal Opera House to debut in Richard Jones' Alcina. She "sang with a high-class, diamantine soprano that never loses its quality".

In 2023, Oropesa sang her first performances of the year at the Bayerische Staatsoper in I masnadieri. Mundo Classical wrote, "Listening to her, one has the impression of being in front of one of the great Italian lyric sopranos of the last century." In February she was awarded "Best Female Opera Singer" by the German magazine OPER!, the only international opera prize in Germany. On March 8, 2023, Oropesa was awarded the prestigious merit of Chevalier de l'Ordre des Arts et des Lettres by the French minister of Culture. The distinction was given to her by the president of Centre national de la musique, Jean-Philippe Thiellay. Afterwards, she took on the role of Ophélie in Hamlet at the Opéra national de Paris, which had not been performed there since 1938. Her performance was regarded as "pure soprano, with a bronzed midrange, solar highs, flawless virtuosity and perfectly intelligible diction". On April 2, her performance of Alcina from the Royal Opera House won the Olivier Award for "Best New Opera Production." On April 19, she was awarded the Franco Abbiati Music Critics Award for her performances in Italy in the year 2022. On April 13, Oropesa returned to the Teatro alla Scala to perform in a new production of Lucia di Lammermoor, a production which was supposed to open the season in 2020 but was cancelled due to the Covid pandemic. Her performance was lauded by critics and "gave a poignant, overwhelming interpretation of Lucia". In June she performed Il turco in Italia at the Teatro Real where she missed her opening night performance due to a flu. When she returned, critics were impressed with her "warm velvety sound" In July, she debuted Roméo et Juliette with the Savonlinna Opera Festival to critical acclaim with a "supple, beautiful voice". In mid July, she interpreted the rarely performed French version of Lucie di Lammermoor with "impressive technical mastery", On July 25, Oropesa interpreted the Star-Spangled Banner during Jill Biden's visit to Paris to celebrate the return of the United States to UNESCO. In October, she returned to the Vienna State Opera to perform in La traviata where she had "flawlessly flowing pianissimo". In November, she made her debut at the Lyric Opera of Chicago in La fille du régiment. The Chicago Sun Times said she was a "complete natural as Marie". On November 9, her album French Bel Canto Arias won best Recording Solo Recital at the International Opera Awards.

In 2024, she returned to Paris to sing Cleopatra in Giulio Cesare at the Palais Garnier where she "triumphs over the evening." She then went to Vienna to debut Mathilde in Guillaume Tell at the Vienna State Opera where she had "coloratura-skilled luminosity and majestic charisma." In Rome, she debuted La sonnambula to great acclaim where her trill was called "the eighth wonder of the world." She won the best "Female Singer of the Year" at the International Opera Awards. In October she opened the season in Valencia with Massenet's Manon where she was the "ideal interpreter" She later released her 7th album, "Mis amores son las flores" on the EuroArts label which focuses on Spanish and Cuban Zarzuela. In December she debuted as Maria Stuarda at the Teatro Real in Madrid. ABC.es called her "vocally indisputable".

The beginning of 2025 saw Lisette star in her first staged production of I Puritani at the Opera National de Paris was "dominated by the impeccable accuracy". She also performed at the 150th anniversary of the Palais Garnier. In the summer of 2025, she sang the title role in a high gloss production of Maria Stuarda by Gaetano Donizetti at the Salzburg Festival. The conductor was Antonello Manacorda, the director was Ulrich Rasche. Her rival queen, Elisabetta, was impersonated by Kate Lindsey. Audience and press were delighted.

In 2026, Lisette returned to the Teatro Real in Madrid where she performed as Amalia in a concert performance of I Masnadieri, one of her signature roles. She "handles all the virtuosic requirements effortlessly" according to La Stampa and she performed a historic encore of her cabaletta in the aria "Carlo Vive!", her third time performing an encore during an opera at the Teatro Real. She then opened a new production of I Puritani at the Royal Ballet and Opera, the first new production of this opera in 35 years. Her performance was universally praised by critics and The Times said she had "nuanced and devastatingly powerful singing." In July, C Major Entertainment announced the release of a Blu-ray version of Maria Stuarda from Lisette's 2025 performance at the Salzburger Festspiele. In late July, Lisette debuted Norma in concert at the Savonlinna Opera Festival with Itä-Savo citing her "technical mastery, the beauty of her voice, and her warm stage presence".

== Personal life ==
In 2008, Oropesa reconnected with her high school boyfriend Steven Harris on Facebook. In October 2012, they married in Tucson, Arizona, during performances of Lucia di Lammermoor at the Arizona Opera. In 2019, she acquired Spanish citizenship.

== Repertoire ==
=== Opera ===
Year (debut)	Role	Composer	Opera	Location
2007	Susanna	Wolfgang Amadeus Mozart	Le nozze di Figaro	Metropolitan Opera
2008	Gilda	Giuseppe Verdi	Rigoletto	New Orleans Opera
2008	Lisette	Giacomo Puccini	La rondine	Metropolitan Opera
2009	Woglinde	Richard Wagner	Das Rheingold	Metropolitan Opera
2009	Woglinde	Richard Wagner	Götterdämmerung	Metropolitan Opera
2009	Waldvogel	Richard Wagner	Siegfried	Metropolitan Opera
2009	Lucia	Gaetano Donizetti	Lucia di Lammermoor	New Jersey State Opera
2010	Konstanze	Wolfgang Amadeus Mozart	Die Entführung aus dem Serail	Welsh National Opera
2010	Nannetta	Giuseppe Verdi	Falstaff	ABAO Opera Bilbao
2010	Fiorilla	Gioachino Rossini	Il turco in Italia	Deutsche Oper am Rhein
2011	Leïla	Georges Bizet	Les pêcheurs de perles	New Orleans Opera
2011	Amor	Christoph Willibald Gluck	Orfeo ed Euridice	Metropolitan Opera
2011	Ismene	Wolfgang Amadeus Mozart	Mitridate, re di Ponto	Bavarian State Opera
2011	Romilda	George Frideric Handel	Serse	San Francisco Opera
2011	Miranda	Jeremy Sams	The Enchanted Island	Metropolitan Opera
2012	Cleopatra	George Frideric Handel	Giulio Cesare	Michigan Opera Theatre
2013	Pamina	Wolfgang Amadeus Mozart	Die Zauberflöte	Florida Grand Opera
2013	Amalia	Giuseppe Verdi	I masnadieri	Washington Concert Opera
2014	Sophie	Jules Massenet	Werther	Metropolitan Opera
2014	Rosalba	Daniel Catán	Florencia en el Amazonas	Los Angeles Opera
2015	Marie	Gaetano Donizetti	La fille du régiment	Pittsburgh Opera
2015	Violetta	Giuseppe Verdi	La traviata	Opera Philadelphia
2016	Hébé / Zima	Jean-Philippe Rameau	Les Indes galantes	Bavarian State Opera
2017	Ophélie	Ambroise Thomas	Hamlet	Lausanne Opera
2017	Norina	Gaetano Donizetti	Don Pasquale	Glyndebourne Festival Opera
2017	Gretel	Engelbert Humperdinck	Hänsel und Gretel	Metropolitan Opera
2018	Eurydice	Christoph Willibald Gluck	Orfeo ed Euridice	Los Angeles Opera
2018	Adina	Gioachino Rossini	Adina	Rossini Opera Festival
2018	Marguerite	Giacomo Meyerbeer	Les Huguenots	Paris Opera
2018	Adina	Gaetano Donizetti	L'elisir d'amore	Paris Opera
2019	Rodelinda	George Frederic Handel	Rodelinda	Gran Teatre del Liceu
2019	Isabelle	Giacomo Meyerbeer	Robert le diable	La Monnaie
2019	Manon	Jules Massenet	Manon	Metropolitan Opera
2020	Rosina	Gioachino Rossini	Il barbiere di Siviglia	Paris Opera
2022	Giulietta	Vincenzo Bellini	I Capuleti e i Montecchi	Teatro alla Scala
2022	Elvira	Vincenzo Bellini	I Puritani	Teatro di San Carlo
2022	Alcina	George Frideric Handel	Alcina	Royal Opera House
2023	Juliette	Charles Gounod	Roméo et Juliette	Savonlinna Opera Festival
2023	Lucie	Gaetano Donizetti	Lucie di Lammermoor	Festival d'Aix-en-Provence
2024	Mathilde	Gioachino Rossini	William Tell	Vienna State Opera
2024	Amina	Vincenzo Bellini	La sonnambula	Teatro dell'Opera di Roma
2024	Maria Stuarda	Gaetano Donizetti	Maria Stuarda	Teatro Real
2026	Norma	Vincenzo Bellini	Norma	Savonlinna Opera Festival
2026	Liù	Giacomo Puccini	Turandot	Arena di Verona Festival

=== Concert ===
Year (debut)	Role	Composer	Piece	Location
2006	Soprano I Soloist	Wolfgang Amadeus Mozart	Great Mass in C minor	New Choral Society
2010	Soprano Soloist	Carl Orff	Carmina Burana	Cleveland Orchestra
2011	Soprano Soloist	George Frideric Handel	Messiah	New Choral Society
2014	Soprano Soloist	Joseph Haydn	The Creation	New Choral Society
2014	Soprano Soloist	Johann Sebastian Bach	St Matthew Passion	Soli Deo Gloria
2015	Soprano Soloist	Johann Sebastian Bach	St John Passion	Soli Deo Gloria
2016	Soprano Soloist	Gabriel Fauré	Requiem	Accademia Nazionale di Santa Cecilia, Rome
2016	Soprano Soloist	Johannes Brahms	Ein deutsches Requiem	Baltimore Symphony Orchestra
2016	Soprano Soloist	Gustav Mahler	Symphony No. 8	Philadelphia Orchestra
2021	Theodora	George Frideric Handel	Theodora	Theater an der Wien, Vienna
2023	Soprano Soloist	Wolfgang Amadeus Mozart	Requiem	International Mozarteum Foundation (Mozartwoche)

== Recordings ==
Video

- Puccini: Il trittico (Frittoli, Blythe; Levine, O'Brien, 2007)
- Humperdinck: Hänsel und Gretel (Schäfer, Coote; Jurowsky, Jones, 2008) EMI
- Puccini: Manon Lescaut (Mattila, Giordani, Croft; Levine, Heeley 2008) EMI
- Puccini: La rondine (Gheorghiu, Alagna, Brenciu, Ramey; Armiliato, Joël, 2009) EMI
- Wagner: Das Rheingold (Blythe, Croft, Terfel, Owens; Levine, Lepage, 2010) EMI
- Sams: The Enchanted Island (de Niese, DiDonato, Daniels, Domingo, Pisaroni; Christie, McDermott, 2012) Virgin Classics
- Frömke: Wagner's Dream (Fillion, Gelb, Lepage, Levine, Luisi, Morris, Voigt, 2012)
- Verdi: Falstaff (Maestri, Blythe, Oropesa, Meade, Fanale; Levine, Carsen, 2014)
- Massenet: Werther (Kaufmann, Koch, Oropesa, Bižić; Altinoglu, Eyre, 2014)
- Mozart: Le nozze di Figaro (Sly, Oropesa, Pisaroni, Sierra, Summers, 2015) San Francisco Opera
- Verdi: La traviata (Oropesa, Shrader, Powell, Rovaris, 2015) Opera Philadelphia
- Mozart: Le nozze di Figaro (Mckinney, Oropesa, Hopkins, Majesky, Gaffigan, 2016) Washington National Opera
- Rameau: Les Indes Galantes (Oropesa, Prohaska, Juric, Quintains, Lis; Bolton, Cherkaoui, 2017) BelAir Classiques
- Rossini: Adina (Oropesa, Priante, Sekgapane, Matheuz, 2018) Rossini Opera Festival, RAI
- Meyerbeer: Les Huguenots (Oropesa, Kang, Jaho, Testé, Deshayes; Mariotti, Kriegenburg, 2018) Paris Opera
- Donizetti: Lucia di Lammermoor (Oropesa, Camarena, Ruciński; Oren, Alden, 2018) Teatro Real
- Verdi: I Masnadieri (Oropesa, Sartori, Pertusi, Cavaletti; Mariotti, McVicar, 2019) Teatro alla Scala
- Massenet: Manon (Oropesa, Fabiano, Ruciński; Benini, Pelly, 2019) Metropolitan Opera
- Mozart: Die Entführung aus dem Serail (Oropesa, Behle, Juric, Mühlemann, Terne; Manacorda, Neuenfels, 2020) Wiener Staatsoper
- Verdi: La traviata (Oropesa, Pirgu, Frontali; Gatti, Martone, 2021) Raiplay
- Handel: Theodora (Oropesa, DiDonato, Spyres, Chest, Bénos-Djian, Emelyanychev, 2021) Medici.tv
- Verdi: Rigoletto (Alvarez, Oropesa, Avetisyan, Pappano, 2021) Royal Opera House, Opus Arte release 2022.
- Donizetti: Lucia di Lammermoor (Oropesa, Bernheim, Petean, Tagliavini, Pidó, 2022) Wiener Staatsoper
- Bellini: I puritani, Concert (Oropesa, Anduaga, Luciano, Buratto, Sagripanti, 2022) Teatro di San Carlo
- Bellini: I Capuleti e i Montecchi (Oropesa, Crebassa, Xiahou, Pertusi, Park, Scappucci, 2022) Teatro alla Scala
- Thomas: Hamlet (Tézier, Oropesa, Hubeaux, Teitgen, Dumoussad, 2023) Paris Opera
- Donizetti: Lucia di Lammermoor (Oropesa, Florez, Pinkhasovich, Pertusi, Chailly, 2023) La Scala, RAI
- Rossini: Il Turco in Italia (Esposito, Oropesa, Kiria, Rocha, Sempey, Sagrapanti, 2023) Arte.tv
- Rossini: Guillaume Tell (Frontali, Osborn, Oropesa, Teitgen, De Billy, 2024) Wiener Staatsoper
- Bellini: La sonnambula (Oropesa, Tagliavini, Osborn, Benitez, Lanzilotta, 2024) Teatro dell'Opera di Roma, RAI
- Donizetti: Maria Stuarda (Oropesa, Akhmetshina, Jordi, Tagliavini, Pérez-sierra, 2025) Arte.tv, Naxos (Blu-ray)
- Donizetti: Maria Stuarda (Oropesa, Lindsey, Davronov, Kulagin, Manacorda, 2025) Medici.tv, C Major Entertainment (Blu-ray)
- Bellini: I Puritani (Oropesa, Brownlee, Rucinski, Van Horn, Armiliato, 2026) Met Opera

Audio

- Within / Without (Oropesa, Iftinca, 2017)
- Aux filles du désert (Oropesa, Borowitz, 2018)
- Ombra Compagna (Oropesa, Manacorda, 2021) PENTATONE
- La traviata (Oropesa, Barbera, Lynch, Oren, Dresden Philharmonie, 2022) PENTATONE
- French Bel Canto Arias (Oropesa, Rovaris, Sächsischer Staatsopernchor Dresden, Dresden Philharmonie, 2022) PENTATONE
- Theodora (Oropesa, Joyce DiDonato, Michael Spyres, John Chest, Paul-Antoine Bénos-Djian, Maxim Emelyanychev, Il Pomo d'Oro, 2022) Warner Classics
- Mis amores son las flores (Oropesa, Diaz, 2024) EuroArts
- I puritani (Oropesa, Brownlee, Evans, Zanellato, Frizza, 2024) EuroArts
- Lucia di Lammermoor (Oropesa, Pop, Olivieri, Zanellato, Carminati, 2025) EuroArts

== Publications ==
- Rowe, Martin & Oropesa, Lisette (2014) "Running, Singing and being Vegan" (ed.), Running, Eating, Thinking: A Vegan Anthology. New York: Lantern Books. ISBN 978-1-59056-348-9 (paperback)
- George, Donald (2015) Master Singers: Advice from the Stage. Oxford University Press. ISBN 978-0-19-932418-7 (paperback)
- Ifkovits, Johannes (2022) Die Oper kocht: Weltstars am Herd: Die Lieblingsrezepte großer Stimmen. Opera Rifko. ISBN 978-3-9502956-5-8 (hardcover)

== Television ==
- 30 Rock: "Audition Day"

== Awards ==
- Grand Finals winner, Metropolitan Opera National Council Auditions, 2005.
- Sarah Tucker study grant, Richard Tucker Music Foundation, 2007.
- Third Prize and Zarzuela Prize, Operalia International Opera Competition, 2007.
- First Place award, Licia Albanese Puccini Competition, 2007.
- Special Winner, Gerda Lissner Foundation, 2008.
- George London Award, 2008.
- Sullivan Foundation Award, 2008
- Opera Hall of Fame, Louisiana State University, September 25, 2011
- Musique et Vin Young Talent Award, 2012.
- Olson Artist, Florida Grand Opera, 2012.
- Richard Tucker Award, Richard Tucker Music Foundation, 2019.
- Beverly Sills Award, Metropolitan Opera, 2019.
- Oper! Award for Best Female Singer, Oper! Magazine, 2023.
- Chevalier de l'Ordre des Arts et des Lettres, 2023.
- Franco Abbiati Music Critics Award, 2023
- International Opera Award for Best Solo Recital Album, 2023
- International Opera Award for Best Female Singer of the Year, 2024
