= The Enchanted Island (2011 opera) =

Opera pasticcio by Jeremy Sams

The Enchanted Island DVD cover with Joyce DiDonato (top), Danielle de Niese (bottom left), and Plácido Domingo (bottom center)

The Enchanted Island is a pasticcio (pastiche) of music by various baroque composers that include George Frideric Handel, Antonio Vivaldi, and Jean-Philippe Rameau. It was devised and written by Jeremy Sams after The Tempest and A Midsummer Night's Dream by William Shakespeare. It was created by Julian Crouch and Phelim McDermott and was premiered by the Metropolitan Opera on 31 December 2011. It stars David Daniels, Joyce DiDonato, Danielle de Niese, Luca Pisaroni and Lisette Oropesa. The popular 70-year-old Spanish tenor, Plácido Domingo, played the small, but important, part of the sea god Neptune. The following month a performance of the pasticcio was broadcast live in movie theaters across the world as part of the Metropolitan Opera Live in HD series. In late 2012 Virgin Classics released this broadcast version on DVD. The Met revived The Enchanted Island two seasons later. Daniels, de Niese, Pisaroni, and Domingo revived their roles from the premiere. Susan Graham resumed the role of Sycorax from DiDonato.

== Roles ==
Roles, voice types, premiere cast
Role	Voice type	Premiere cast, 31 December 2011 Conductor: William Christie
Prospero, rightful Duke of Milan	countertenor	David Daniels
Sycorax, vicious and powerful witch, mother of Caliban	mezzo-soprano	Joyce DiDonato
Ariel, a spirit	coloratura soprano	Danielle de Niese
Caliban, a savage	bass-baritone	Luca Pisaroni
Miranda, Prospero's daughter	soprano	Lisette Oropesa
Neptune, god of freshwater and the sea	tenor	Plácido Domingo
Ferdinand, prince of Naples and the son of Alonso, the King of Naples	countertenor	Anthony Roth Costanzo
Helena, Hermia's friend, in love with Demetrius	soprano	Layla Claire
Hermia, Helena's friend and daughter of Egeus, in love with Lysander	mezzo-soprano	Elizabeth DeShong
Demetrius, suitor to Hermia, former lover of Helena	tenor	Paul Appleby
Lysander, in love with Hermia	baritone	Elliot Madore
Quartet	soprano soprano tenor bass-baritone	Ashley Emerson; Monica Yunus; Philippe Castagner; Tyler Simpson
Spirits, courtiers, water nymphs

== Musical numbers ==
The music was drawn from the following sources:

Act 1
Overture	George Frideric Handel: Alcina, HWV 34
"My Ariel" (Prospero, Ariel) – "Ah, if you would earn your freedom" (Prospero)	Antonio Vivaldi: Cessate, omai cessate, cantata, RV 684, "Ah, ch'infelice sempre"
"My master, generous master – I can conjure you fire" (Ariel)	Handel: Il trionfo del tempo e del disinganno, oratorio, HWV 46a, part 1, "Un pensiero nemico di pace"
"Then what I desire" (Prospero, Ariel)
"There are times when the dark side – Maybe soon, maybe now" (Sycorax, Caliban)	Handel: Teseo, HWV 9, act 5, scene 1, "Morirò, ma vendicata"
"The blood of a dragon – Stolen by treachery" (Caliban)	Handel: La resurrezione, oratorio, HWV 47, part 1, scene 1, "O voi, dell'Erebo"
"Miranda! My Miranda!" (Prospero, Miranda) – "I have no words for this feeling" (Miranda)	Handel: Notte placida e cheta, cantata, HWV 142, "Che non si dà"
"My master's books – Take salt and stones" (Ariel)	Based on Jean-Philippe Rameau: Les fêtes d'Hébé, Deuxième entrée: La Musique, scene 7, "Aimez, aimez d'une ardeur mutuelle"
Quartet: "Days of pleasure, nights of love" (Helena, Hermia, Demetrius, Lysander)	Handel: Semele, HWV 58, act 1, scene 4, "Endless pleasure, endless love"
The Storm (chorus)	André Campra: Idoménée, act 2, scene 1, "O Dieux! O justes Dieux!"
"I've done as you commanded" (Ariel, Prospero)	Handel: La resurrezione, oratorio, HWV 47, "Di rabbia indarno freme"
"Oh, Helena, my Helen – You would have loved this island" (Demetrius)	Handel: La resurrezione, oratorio, HWV 47, part 1, scene 2, "Così la tortorella"
"Would that it could last forever – Wonderful, wonderful" (Miranda, Demetrius)	Handel: Ariodante, HWV 33, act 1, scene 5, "Prendi, prendi"
"Why am I living?" (Helena) "With this, now I can start again – Once, once at my command" (Sycorax)	Handel: Teseo, HWV 9, act 2, scene 1, "Dolce riposo" Jean-Marie Leclair: Scylla et Glaucus, act 4, scene 4, "Et toi, dont les embrasements… Noires divinités"
"Mother, why not? – Mother, my blood is freezing" (Caliban)	Vivaldi: Il Farnace, RV 711, act 2, scenes 5 & 6, "Gelido in ogni vena"
"Help me out of this nightmare" – Quintet: "Beautiful, wonderful" (Helena, Sycorax, Caliban, Miranda, Demetrius)	Handel: Ariodante, HWV 33, act 1, scene 5, recitative preceding "Prendi, prendi"
"Welcome Ferdinand – All I've done is try to help you" (Prospero)	Vivaldi: Longe mala, umbrae, terrores, motet, RV 629, "Longe mala, umbrae, terrores"
"Curse you, Neptune" (Lysander)	Vivaldi: Griselda, RV 718, act 3, scene 6, "Dopo un'orrida procella"
"Your bride, sir?" (Ariel, Lysander, Demetrius, Miranda) – Trio: "Away, away! You loathsome wretch, away!" (Miranda, Demetrius, Lysander)	Handel: Susanna, oratorio, HWV 66, part 2, "Away, ye tempt me both in vain"
"Two castaways – Arise! Arise, great Neptune" (Ariel)	Attr. Henry Purcell: The Tempest, or, The Enchanted Island, Z. 631, act 2, no. 3, "Arise, ye subterranean winds"
"This is convolvulus" (Helena, Caliban) – "If the air should hum with noises" (Caliban)	Handel: Deidamia, HWV 42, act 2, scene 4, "Nel riposo e nel contento"
"Neptune the Great" (Chorus)	Handel: Four Coronation Anthems, HWV 258, "Zadok the Priest"
"Who dares to call me? – Gone forever" (Neptune, Ariel) "I'd forgotten that I was Lord" (Neptune, Chorus)	Based on Handel: Tamerlano, HWV 18, "Oh, per me lieto" Rameau: Hippolyte et Aricie, act 2, scene 3, "Qu'à servir mon courroux"
Act 2
"My God, what's this? – Where are you now?" (Hermia)	Handel: Hercules, oratorio, HWV 60, act 3, scene 3, "Where shall I fly?"
"So sweet, talking together" "Now it's returning" (Sycorax)	Vivaldi: Argippo, RV 697, act 1, scene 1, "Se lento ancora il fulmine" Handel: Alcina, HWV 34, act 3, scene 1 – "Stà nell'Ircana"
"Have you seen a young lady?" (Demetrius, Helena, Caliban) – "A voice, a face, a figure half-remembered" (Helena)	Handel: Amadigi di Gaula, HWV 11, act 3, scene 4, "Hanno penetrato i detti tuoi l'inferno"
"His name, she spoke his name – The rage" (Caliban)	Handel: Hercules, oratorio, HWV 60, act 3, scene 2 "O Jove, what land is this? – I rage"
"I try to shape my destiny – Chaos, confusion" (Prospero)	Handel: Amadigi di Gaula, HWV 11, act 2, scene 5, "Pena tiranna"
"Oh, my darling, my sister – Men are fickle" (Helena, Hermia)	Handel: Atalanta, HWV 35, act 2, scene 3 – "Amarilli? – O dei!"
"I knew the spell" (Sycorax, Caliban) – "Hearts that love can all be broken" (Sycorax)	Giovanni Battista Ferrandini (attr. Handel): Il pianto di Maria, cantata, HWV 234, "Giunta l'ora fatal – Sventurati i miei sospiri"
"Such meager consolation – No, I'll have no consolation" (Caliban)	Vivaldi: Bajazet, RV 703, act 3, scene 7, "Verrò, crudel spietato"
Masque of the Wealth of all the World: 1. Quartet: Caliban goes into his dream, "Wealth and love can be thine" 2. Parade; 3. The Women and the Unicorn; 4. The Animals; 5. Chaos; 6. The Calm	Rameau: Les Indes galantes, act 3, scene 7, "Tendre amour"; Rameau: Les fêtes d'Hébé, Troisième entrée: La Danse, scene 7, Tambourin en rondeau; Rameau: Les fêtes d'Hébé, Troisième entrée: La Danse, scene 7, Musette; Jean-Féry Rebel: Les Élémens, act 1, Tambourins 1 & 2; Rameau: Platée, act 1, scene 6, Orage; Campra: Idoménée, act 2, scene 1
"With no sail and no rudder – Gliding onwards" (Ferdinand)	Handel: Amadigi di Gaula, HWV 11, act 2, scene 1, "Io ramingo – Sussurrate, onde vezzose"
Sextet: "Follow hither, thither, follow me" (Ariel, Miranda, Helena, Hermia, Demetrius, Lysander)	Handel: Il trionfo del tempo e del disinganno, oratorio, HWV 46a, part 2, quartet: "Voglio tempo"
"Sleep now" (Ariel)	Vivaldi: Tito Manlio, RV 78, act 3, scene 1, "Sonno, se pur sei sonno"
"Darling, it's you at last" (Hermia, Lysander, Demetrius, Helena)	Vivaldi: La verità in cimento, RV 739, act 2, scene 9, "Anima mia, mio ben"
"The wat'ry God has heard the island's pleas" (Chorus)	Handel: Susanna, oratorio, HWV 66, part 3, "Impartial Heav'n!"
"Sir, honored sir – I have dreamed you" (Ferdinand, Miranda)	Handel: Tanti strali al sen mi scocchi, cantata, HWV 197, "Ma se l'alma sempre geme"
"The time has come. The time is now" ("Maybe soon, maybe now," reprise) (Sycorax)	Handel: Teseo, HWV 9, act 5, scene 1, "Morirò, ma vendicata"
"Enough! How dare you?" (Prospero, Neptune) – "Tyrant! Merely a petty tyrant." (Neptune)	Handel: Tamerlano, HWV 18, act 3, scene 1, "Empio, per farti guerra"
"To stray is mortal" (Prospero, Caliban) – "Forgive me, please forgive me" (Prospero)	Handel: Partenope, HWV 27, act 3, scene 4, "Ch'io parta?"
"We gods who watch the ways of man" (Neptune, Sycorax, Chorus)	Handel: L'Allegro, il Penseroso ed il Moderato, HWV 55, part 1, "Come, but keep thy wonted state – Join with thee"
"This my hope for the future" (Prospero) – "Can you feel the heavens are reeling" (Ariel)	Vivaldi: Griselda, RV 718, act 2, scene 2, "Agitata da due venti"
"Now a bright new day is dawning" (Ensemble)	Handel: Judas Maccabaeus, oratorio, HWV 63, part 3, "Hallelujah"

== Recording ==
Year	Cast (Ariel, Sycorax, Prospero, Neptune, Caliban)	Conductor, opera house and orchestra	Label
2011	Danielle de Niese, Joyce DiDonato, David Daniels, Plácido Domingo, Luca Pisaroni	William Christie, Metropolitan Opera orchestra and chorus	DVD: Virgin Classics (The Met Live in HD Series)
