= The Goodrich Silvertown Orchestra =

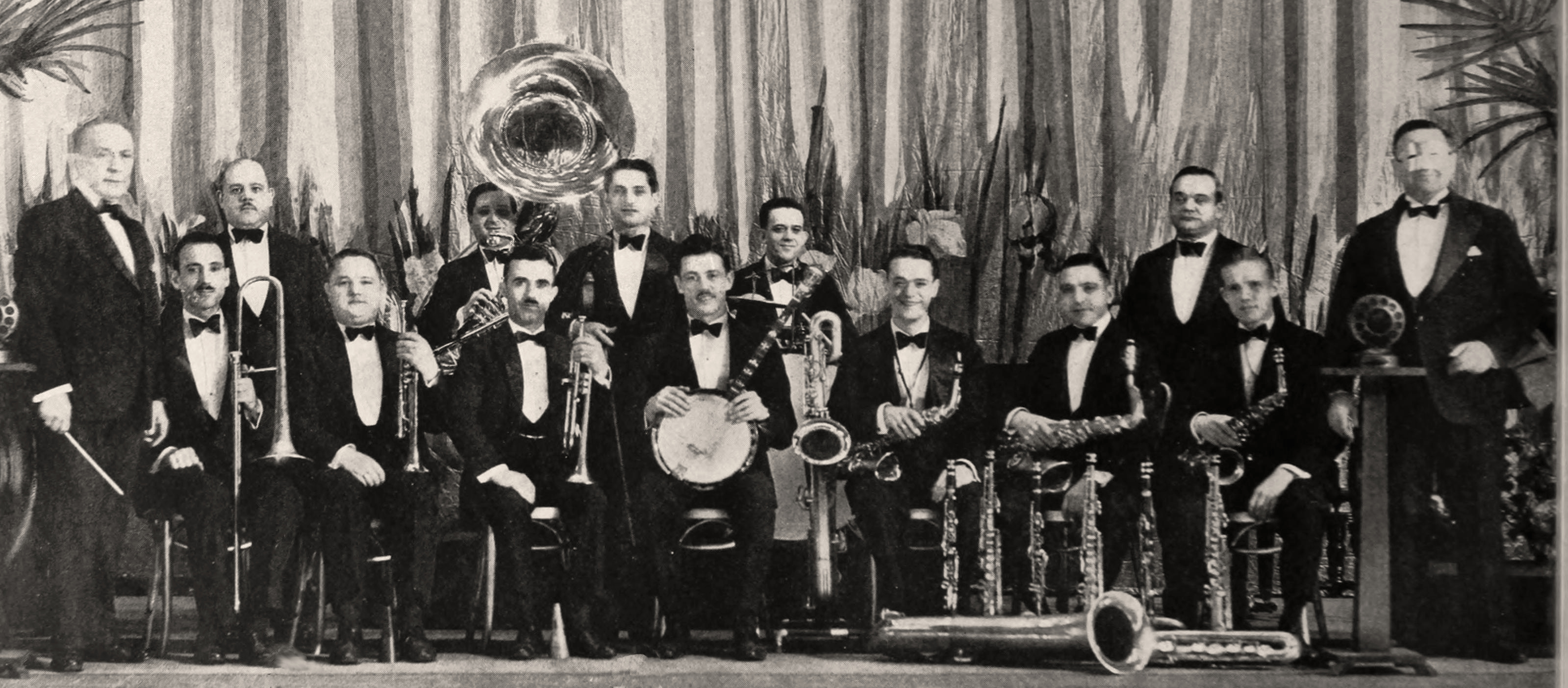
Goodrich Silvertown Orchestra, featuring the Silver-Masked Tenor

The Goodrich Silvertown Orchestra was a musical variety radio program, sponsored by B. F. Goodrich and heard in different formats and timeslots from 1925 until 1935. The performers included Henry Burr (tenor), Carl Mathieu (tenor), James Stanley (baritone), Stanley Baughman (bass), Monroe Silver (comedian), Frank Banta (piano), and Sam Herman (xylophone). The Orchestra's theme music was "Her Waltz" by Arthur Johnston.

The hour-long program of "orchestra, songs, character sketches" began on February 12, 1925, on WEAF in New York City, airing Thursday nights at 10pm ET. On November 18, 1926, the show moved to the NBC Red Network—of which WEAF was the flagship station—where it was heard Thursdays at 10, and then 9pm ET (1926–27) and then Wednesdays at 9:30pm ET (1927–28). At various times the program was titled The Goodrich Zippers, The Silvertown Cord Orchestra, Silvertown Orchestra, Silvertown Quartet and The Silvertown Zippers. The Zippers were a small banjo ensemble featured in 1926-27.

In 1935-36, B. A. Rolfe was the bandleader on 15-minute pre-recorded programs created for syndication.

== The Silver-Masked Tenor ==
The show was notable for introducing listeners to Joseph M. White, a.k.a. "The Silver-Masked Tenor", who had first been heard on WEAF as early as 1923. With a mask concealing his secret identity, White found such fame on radio that when the Silvertown Orchestra played on the Keith vaudeville circuit, police had to escort White into theaters.

== Listen to ==
- "Mary Lou" B. F. Goodrich Silvertown Cord Orchestra (September 14, 1926)
