= Peace through Music International =

- Website: peacethroughmusicinternational.org

Peace through Music International, formerly known as the Shropshire Music Foundation, is a non-profit organization which aims to improve the lives of children in war-torn countries through participation in music. Their mission is to "redress psychosocial trauma, advance emotional health, develop scholastic achievement, foster ethnic tolerance, promote peace, and improve the quality of life for war-affected children and adolescents through the establishment of on-going music education and performance programs."

== History ==
Founded by Liz Shropshire, a music teacher in Los Angeles, U.S.A. in 1999, the Shropshire Foundation currently has programs around the world. Some of these programs include:

- In Kosovo, Peace Through Music has helped children recover from the trauma of the ethnic cleansing that Serbian forces undertook in 1998.
- In Northern Ireland, where segregation of Protestants and Catholics has torn apart communities.
- In Uganda, Peace Through Music has helped children who were victims of child soldiery.
- In Greece, Peace Through Music has taught music classes in refugee camps since Fall 2016.

== Leadership and funding ==
Peace through Music International has an all-volunteer staff, and in many communities, the program is run by young adults who were so greatly influenced by Ms. Shropshire's foundation that they have committed to furthering the program. Groups have sprung up all over the world to benefit the Shropshire Music Foundation (which is run entirely off donations). Private contributors, music companies, and schools of music, such as the Eastman School of Music, are working to keep the foundation alive, as it has become financially threatened in recent years.
