= Louise Clappe =

American writer (1819–1906)

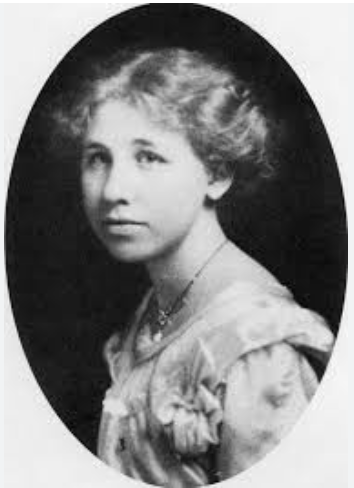
- (undated)
- Born: Louise Amelia Knapp Smith; July 28, 1819; Elizabeth, New Jersey, U.S.
- Died: February 9, 1906 (aged 86); New Jersey
- Occupation: Writer
- Spouse: Fayette Clapp (or Dr. Fayette Clappe)
- Writing career
- Pen name: Dame Shirley
- Language: English
- Genre: Letter writer
- Notable work: "Shirley Letters"

Louise Clappe (née Smith; pseudonym, Dame Shirley; July 28, 1819 – February 9, 1906) was an American writer, best known for her "Shirley Letters." Clappe was born in New Jersey, spent most of her youth and young adult life in Massachusetts, and later moved out West to Quincy, California, in Plumas County with her husband Fayette Clapp. It was out West where she took on the pen name of Dame Shirley and wrote her widely known "Shirley Letters". Louise and Fayette eventually separated, but she remained out West teaching for some time. Louise eventually returned to New Jersey, where she lived out the remainder of her life, dying in 1906. The Quincy town plaza is named after her.

== Early life ==
Louise Amelia Knapp Smith was born July 28, 1819, in Elizabeth, New Jersey, to Moses and Louis (Lee) Smith. Her father Moses Smith, graduated from Williams College in Massachusetts in the year of 1811, and he once had the responsibility of being in charge of a local academy. Both Moses and his wife came from Amherst, Massachusetts. There is some speculation that her parents might be cousins, for both Moses' mother and wife shared the same maiden name (Lee). Both of Clappe's parents died before she turned 20, with her father dying in 1832 and her mother in 1837. Clappe was one of seven children, with three brothers and three other sisters.

In 1838, she attended a female seminary in Charlestown, Massachusetts. The following two years, she continued her education at Amherst Academy. Clappe was a good student, whose interests included metaphysics. Following in her father's footsteps, Clappe also got involved with education, teaching in Amherst in 1840. Around the same time, she was introduced to Alexander Hill Everett (1792-1847) who happened to be at least twice of Clappe's age. Everett and Clappe's relationship was mostly an intellectual one. Between the years 1839 to 1847, they had exchanged 46 letters. During this time, Clappe also met her future husband, Fayette Clappe. When Louise told Everett about her new relationship, he was not happy for her and things ended badly.

== Marriage ==
Born in June 1824 in Chesterfield, Massachusetts, Fayette Clapp was five years younger than Louise. (Note: The original spelling of the surname was Clapp, not Clappe.) He started his college education at Princeton, but finished up at Brown University, graduating in 1848. He briefly continued his education, studying medicine at Castleton in Vermont. Similar to Louise's mother, Fayette's mother also bore the maiden name Lee. The exact date of their wedding is unknown; however, some believe it occurred in either 1848 or 1849. Louise and Fayette never had any children together. Her marriage with Clapp started to falter around 1852. While the two separated around that time and Fayette headed back East, their marriage did not officially end until some years later.

== Going West ==
Louise and Fayette had always wanted to go West, Louise first mentioning her desire to do so in one of her letters to Everett. While Fayette was studying medicine in Vermont, the couple found the excuse to go to California at the discovery of gold and caught gold rush fever. Upon arrival in California, both Louise and Fayette were ill. Louise had suffered from chronic illnesses throughout the 1830s and 1840s. Her first year in California was spent taking care of Fayette who had been sick for their whole first year, and died in vain. During this time, Fayette was able to obtain an absentee degree from Castleton, making him a doctor. Their first year in California was spent living in San Francisco and Plumas, which was located near Marysville in the north-central part of the state. Fayette was elected as a delegate to a political nominating convention and was also chosen to serve on a committee protesting the tactics of agents hired to help the incoming immigrant wagon trains from across the Plains.

== Shirley Letters ==
The Shirley Letters, for which Louise was well known, were written between September 1851 and November 1852. She authored a total of 23 letters, all addressed to her sister Molly. Throughout the years, multiple editions of her letters were in print. Her letters were described as being both witty and disturbing, while giving insight into California mining life. In her earlier letters, Shirley never uses a full name and instead uses just a first initial. The Shirley Letters were all carefully written, and they showed off Louise's education and writing skills, for all of the letters were unique and extremely rich in detail. In the sixth letter written back to her sister Molly, Shirley discusses her shock at how vulgar the men in California are, and the wider tolerance for such vulgarity. The same letter also indicates that her marriage with Fayette was failing, describing his business transactions with some bitterness. In her twelfth letter, Louise claims that she wants to give the true picture of mining life, and she did so from a distinctly female perspective. Some writers, such as Marlene Smith-Bargaining believe that Shirley never intended for her letters to be private, but instead wrote them for a more public audience. After penning the Shirley Letters, Louise took a break from writing but soon resumed writing for the Marysville Herald in the spring and summer of 1857. The Herald was not much of a newspaper, but more of a vehicle for advertisements. Going with the theme of the Herald, Louise's letters came off as sounding fake and had an artificial feel to them. Unlike the Shirley Letters, these letters did not showcase her talent for writing and instead made Louise appear less intellectual than she actually was.

== Other writings and life in San Francisco ==
While Louise was staying in San Francisco, she made the acquaintance of Ferdinand C. Ewer, who printed her Shirley Letters in his new periodical, The Pioneer in 1854–1855. Not only did Louise submit her letters, but she also wrote two other articles for the Pioneer. The two articles "Superstition" and "Equality of the Sexes" once again did not show off her writing gifts. In both articles, she still identifies herself as Mrs. Louisa Clapp, even though she and Fayette had split at this point.

Louise began teaching in San Francisco in 1854. In 1856, she officially filed for divorce from Fayette.

While living in San Francisco, she was well liked and became well known for her teaching and writing. She taught for two different all-girls schools, Denman Grammar School and Broadway Grammar school. In 1857, she most likely made US$900 for the year. Between 1868 and 1869, she switched the spelling of her last name to Clappe. Throughout the next decade, she went back and forth between the two different spellings, ending with the different from her original (Clappe).

While in San Francisco, she adopted and raised a niece, Genevieve Stebbins. In 1878, she retired from teaching. The Denman School raised a farewell gift of US$2,000. Louise lived out the remains of her life in New York City for the next 28 years. She resumed her writing in 1881 when a periodical at Hellmuth Ladies' College at London, Ontario published a series of her articles under her Shirley name. She died in New Jersey at an elderly home from chronic diarrhea and senility in 1906. Her headstone reads that she was the wife of Dr. Fayette Clappe.

== Legacy ==
Clappe's Shirley Letters were made into a 2017 opera, Girls of the Golden West.
