= Ben Moore (composer) =

American composer (born 1960)

Ben Moore (born January 2, 1960) is an American composer whose works include art song, musical theatre, cabaret, chamber music, choral music and opera. His songs have been recorded by Deborah Voigt, Susan Graham Nathan Gunn and Lawrence Brownlee on the EMI, Sony BMG, Warner Classics and Opus Arte labels. Other singers who have performed his music include Frederica von Stade, Jerry Hadley, Robert White, and Audra McDonald.

== Biography ==
Ben Moore – 14 songs was published by G. Schirmer in 2006. The Metropolitan Opera's farewell gala for Joseph Volpe, broadcast nationally on PBS in 2006, featured two of his operatic parody songs. His song cycles include So Free Am I commissioned by the Marilyn Horne Foundation, Ode to a Nightingale and Dear Theo. Moore wrote the score for the opera Enemies, a Love Story which premiered at Palm Beach Opera in February, 2015, and for Odyssey, commissioned by the Glimmerglass Festival.

Moore was born in Syracuse, New York and received a B.A. from Hamilton College and an M.F.A. from the Parsons School of Design.

== Works and publications ==
- Ben Moore: 14 Songs (G. Schirmer, Inc.)
- The G. Schirmer Collection of American Art Song –50 Songs by 29 Composers (G. Schirmer, Inc.)

(Collection includes “The Cloak, the Boat and the Shoes.”)

- The Opera America Songbook (Schott Music) (Collection includes "The Time to Begin")
- Eight Songs (Classical Vocal Repertoire)

(Song Collection for Voice and Piano)

- So Free Am I (CVR)

(Seven Settings of Poems by Women)

- Cabaret and Theater Songs (CVR)
- The Audience Song (CVR)
- Content to Be Behind Me (CVR)
- I Love Teaching Voice (CVR)
- I’m Glad I’m Not a Tenor (CVR)
- Sexy Lady (CVR; written for Susan Graham, it is a lament for lower-voiced women regarding roles they sing in opera)
- Wagner Roles (CVR)
- We Love the Opera (CVR)
- John and Abigail (based on letters of John and Abigail Adams)
- Henry and Company

(musical theatre)

- Enemies, a Love Story

(A new opera based on the novel by Isaac Bashevis Singer with libretto by Nahma Sandrow)

- Odyssey (A new opera for children based on Homer's Odyssey with libretto by Kelley Rourke)
- Dear Theo (based on letters of Vincent van Gogh)

(voice and piano)

- Dear Theo

(for SATB chorus)

- The Lake Isle of Innisfree

(for SATB chorus)

- The House on Kronenstrasse

(for piano, viola, clarinet and narrator)

- Henry and Company

(musical theatre)

- Bye Bye Broadway

(musical theatre)
