= Kathleen Battle discography =

This is a list of recordings of Kathleen Battle (born 13 August 1948), an African-American operatic soprano. The list includes live and studio recordings available in audio CD, VHS and DVD. Five of the recordings listed here won Grammy Awards:

- Best Classical Vocal Soloist Performance for Kathleen Battle Sings Mozart, 1986
- Best Classical Vocal Soloist Performance for Salzburg Recital, 1987
- Best Opera Recording for Richard Strauss: Ariadne Auf Naxos, 1987
- Best Classical Vocal Soloist Performance for Kathleen Battle at Carnegie Hall (Handel, Mozart, Liszt, Strauss, etc.), 1992
- Best Opera Recording for Handel: Semele, 1993

== Discography ==
=== Choral and symphonic ===
Year	Title	Soloists	Conductor, Orchestra	Live / Studio	Label
1977	Bach: Weichet nur, betrübte Schatten, BWV 202 "Wedding Cantata"	Kathleen Battle	James Levine; Chicago Symphony Orchestra	Studio	RCA
1983	Berg: Lulu Suite	Kathleen Battle	Michael Gielen; Cincinnati Symphony Orchestra		
1984	Brahms: Ein Deutsches Requiem	Kathleen Battle, Hakan Hagegard	James Levine; Chicago Symphony Orchestra	Live	Sony
	Mahler: Symphony No. 4 in G major	Kathleen Battle	Lorin Maazel; Vienna Philharmonic	Studio	Sony
1985	Mozart: Requiem	Kathleen Battle, Ann Murray, David Rendall, Matti Salminen	Daniel Barenboim; Choeurs Et Orchestre De Paris	Studio	EMI Classics
	Mozart: Mass in C major, K 317 "Coronation Mass" (Celebrated by Pope John Paul II)	Kathleen Battle, Trudeliese Schmidt, Gosta Winbergh; Ferruccio Furlanetto	Herbert von Karajan; Sistine Chapel Singers, Vienna Philharmonic	Live	Deutsche Grammophon
1986	Fauré: Requiem	Kathleen Battle, Andreas Schmidt, Timothy Farrell	Carlo Maria Giulini; Philharmonia Orchestra	Live	Deutsche Grammophon
1987	Handel: Messiah	Kathleen Battle, Florence Quivar, Samuel Ramey, John Aler	Andrew Davis; Toronto Symphony; Toronto Mendelssohn Choir	Studio	EMI Classics
1989	Poulenc: Gloria; Stabat Mater	Kathleen Battle	Seiji Ozawa; Boston Symphony Orchestra; Tanglewood Festival Chorus		Deutsche Grammophon
1990	Mahler: Symphony No. 2 in C minor	Kathleen Battle, Maureen Forrester	Leonard Slatkin; St. Louis Symphony Chorus; St. Louis Symphony Orchestra	Studio	Telarc
1991	Haydn: The Creation	Kathleen Battle, Kurt Moll, Gösta Winbergh	James Levine; Berlin Philharmonic	Studio	Deutsche Grammophon
	Mozart: Mass in C minor	Kathleen Battle, Lella Cuberli	James Levine; Vienna State Opera Chorus; Vienna Philharmonic	Studio	Deutsche Grammophon
1992	Mendelssohn: A Midsummer Night's Dream	Kathleen Battle, Judi Dench, Frederica von Stade	Seiji Ozawa; Boston Symphony Orchestra; Tanglewood Festival Chorus	Live	Deutsche Grammophon; For details, see A Midsummer Night's Dream (Seiji Ozawa recording)
1997	André Previn: Honey and Rue; Samuel Barber: Knoxville: Summer of 1915; George Gershwin: selections from Porgy and Bess	Kathleen Battle	André Previn; Orchestra of St. Luke's	Studio	Deutsche Grammophon
2001	Vangelis: Mythodea	Kathleen Battle, Jessye Norman	London Metropolitan Orchestra; Greek National Opera Chorus	Live	Sony
2003	Brahms: Ein Deutsches Requiem	Kathleen Battle, José van Dam	Herbert von Karajan; Vienna Philharmonic	Live	Sony
2004	Mozart: Exsultate, jubilate /Arias	Kathleen Battle	André Previn; Royal Philharmonic Orchestra	Studio	EMI Classics

=== Complete operas ===
Year	Title	Role	Cast	Conductor Orchestra	Live / Studio	Label
1979	Massenet: Werther	Sophie	Battle, Crespin, Carlson, Kraus, et al.	Richard Bonynge; Metropolitan Opera Orchestra	Live	Gala
1985	Verdi: Un ballo in maschera	Oscar	Battle, Pavarotti, M. Price, C. Ludwig, et al.	Georg Solti; National Philharmonic Orchestra	Studio	Decca
1986	Mozart: Don Giovanni	Zerlina	Battle, Tomowa-Sintow, Varady, Baltsa, et al.	Herbert von Karajan; Berlin Philharmonic	Studio	Deutsche Grammophon
1987	Mozart: Die Entführung aus dem Serail	Blonde	Battle, Gruberova, Winbergh, Zednik, et al.	Georg Solti; Vienna Philharmonic	Studio	Universal International
1987	Mozart: Le nozze di Figaro	Susanna	Battle, M. Price, A. Murray, Allen, et al.	Riccardo Muti; Vienna Philharmonic	Studio	EMI
1990	Richard Strauss: Ariadne auf Naxos	Zerbinetta	Battle, Tomowa-Sintow, Lakes, Baltsa, et al.	James Levine; Vienna Philharmonic	Studio	Polygram
	Donizetti: L'elisir d'amore	Adina	Battle, Pavarotti, Nucci, Dara, et al.	James Levine; Metropolitan Opera Orchestra	Studio	Deutsche Grammophon
1991	Rossini: Il signor Bruschino	Sofia	Battle, Ramey, Lopardo, Arevalo, et al.	Ion Marin; English Chamber Orchestra	Studio	Deutsche Grammophon
	Rossini: L'italiana in Algeri	Elvira	Battle, Horne, Ramey, et al.	Claudio Scimone; I Solisti Veneti; Prague Philharmonic Chorus	Studio	Erato Libretto
	Mozart: Die Zauberflöte	Pamina	Battle, Araiza, Hemm, Serra, et al.	James Levine; Metropolitan Opera Orchestra	Live	Gala
1992	Wagner: Siegfried	Waldvogel (forest bird)	Battle, Goldberg, Zednik, Gallo, et al.	James Levine; Metropolitan Opera Orchestra	Studio	Deutsche Grammophon
1993	Rossini: Il barbiere di Siviglia	Rosina	Battle, Domingo, Lopardo, Gallo, et al.	Claudio Abbado; Chamber Orchestra of Europe	Studio	Deutsche Grammophon
1993	Handel: Semele	Semele	Battle, Horne, Aler, McNair, et al.	John Nelson; English Chamber Orchestra	Studio	Deutsche Grammophon
	Verdi: Don Carlo	A Voice from Heaven	Battle, Millo, Zajick, Croft, et al.	James Levine; Metropolitan Opera Orchestra	Studio	Sony

=== Recitals, concerts, aria and song collections ===
Year recorded	Title	Genre	Collaborators	Label
1977	Angel's Visits and other Vocal Gems of Victorian America (Note: Battle sings one solo song and one duet)	Classical	Raymond Murcell (baritone); Rose Taylor (mezzo-soprano); Lawrence Skrobakcs (piano)	New World Records LP (later reissued on CD)
1981	Robert Schumann: Spanish Love Songs; Andante and Variations; Piano Quartet	Classical	John Aler (tenor); Dominic Cossa (baritone); Charles Wadsworth (piano)	ASV
1983	The Metropolitan Opera Centennial Gala	Opera	Elisabeth Söderström (soprano); Frederica von Stade (mezzo-soprano)	Deutsche Grammophon DVD; 00440-073-4538
1984	Salzburg Recital	Classical	James Levine (piano)	Deutsche Grammophon (recorded live at Salzburg Festival)
1986	A Christmas Celebration: Kathleen Battle	Classical, Sacred songs, Spirituals	Leonard Slatkin (conductor), Orchestra of St. Luke's; New York Choral Artists; Boys' Choir of Harlem	EMI Classics
	Kathleen Battle and Christopher Parkening: Pleasures of Their Company	Classical		EMI Classics
	Kathleen Battle Sings Mozart	Classical	André Previn (conductor); Royal Philharmonic Orchestra	EMI Classics
1987	New Year's Concert in Vienna	Classical	Herbert von Karajan (conductor); Vienna Philharmonic	Deutsche Grammophon
	Schubert Lieder	Classical	James Levine (piano)	Deutsche Grammophon
	Ombra Mai Fu	Classical	Lawrence Skrobacs (piano), Nancy Allen (harp), Dan Saunders (piano)	Seven Seas Records—recorded and released only in Japan in affiliation with Nikka Whiskey. Two separate issues include a 12-inch 33-1/3 rpm vinyl release with 9 art song selections, and a 12-inch 45-rpm release with only 4 song selections.
1988	Battle & Domingo Live in Tokyo	Classical	James Levine (conductor); Metropolitan Opera Orchestra	Deutsche Grammophon
1991	The Metropolitan Opera Gala 1991	Opera	James Levine (conductor); Metropolitan Opera Orchestra	Deutsche Grammophon DVD; 00440-073-4582
	Kathleen Battle and Jessye Norman: Spirituals in Concert	Spirituals	James Levine (conductor)	Polygram Records
	Handel Arias	Classical	Neville Marriner (Conductor); Academy of St. Martin in the Fields	EMI Classics
1992	Kathleen Battle and Itzhak Perlman: J.S. Bach Arias	Classical	John Nelson; Orchestra of St. Luke's	Deutsche Grammophon
	A Carnegie Hall Christmas Concert	Classical	André Previn (conductor); Orchestra of St. Luke's; Wynton Marsalis; Frederica von Stade (mezzo-soprano)	Sony DVD and CD
	Kathleen Battle at Carnegie Hall	Classical	Margo Garrett (piano)	Deutsche Grammophon
	Kathleen Battle and Wynton Marsalis: Baroque Duet	Classical	John Nelson (conductor); Orchestra of St. Luke's	Sony
	New Year's Eve Concert 1992: Richard Strauss Gala	Classical	Renée Fleming; Frederica von Stade; Claudio Abbado (conductor); Berlin Philharmonic	Kultur Video DVD; Sony CD
1993	Kathleen Battle and Jean-Pierre Rampal in Concert	Classical	Myron Lutzke (cello); Anthony Newman (harpsichord); Margo Garrett (piano); John Steele Ritter (piano)	Sony
	Kathleen Battle: Bel Canto Arias	Classical	Bruno Campanella (conductor); London Philharmonic Orchestra	Deutsche Grammophon
	Kathleen Battle in Concert	Classical; Spirituals	James Levine (piano)	Deutsche Grammophon
	So Many Stars	Folk songs, Lullabies, Spirituals		Sony
1996	Angels' Glory	Classical, Spirituals, Sacred songs	Christopher Parkening (classical guitar)	Sony
	French Opera Arias	Classical	Myung-whun Chung (conductor); Orchestre de l'Opéra Bastille	Polygram Records
1997	Grace	Classical	Robert Sadin (conductor)	Sony
	Mozart Opera Arias	Classical	James Levine (conductor); Metropolitan Opera Orchestra	Deutsche Grammophon
2002	Classic Battle: A Portrait	Classical, Romantic, Spanish folksongs, American folksongs, Jazz		Sony
2003	First Love	Classical		BMG (Japan only)
2004	20th Century Masters: The Best of Kathleen Battle	Classical	Bastille Opera Orchestra; London Philharmonic Orchestra; Metropolitan Opera Orchestra; Orchestra of St. Luke's	Deutsche Grammophon

=== Soundtracks ===
Year	Film	Song	Collaborators	Label
2000	Fantasia 2000	Pomp and Circumstance, marches by Edward Elgar	James Levine (conductor); Chicago Symphony Orchestra	Disney
2004	House of Flying Daggers	Lovers (Title Song)	Tomoko Kanda; ARIGAT Orchestra	Sony

== Notes and references ==
- Richard Dyer, Elizabeth Forbes: "Kathleen Battle", Grove Music Online ed. L. Macy (Accessed September 21, 2008), (subscription access)
