= Bivings-Converse House =

Historic house in South Carolina, United States

- U.S. National Register of Historic Places
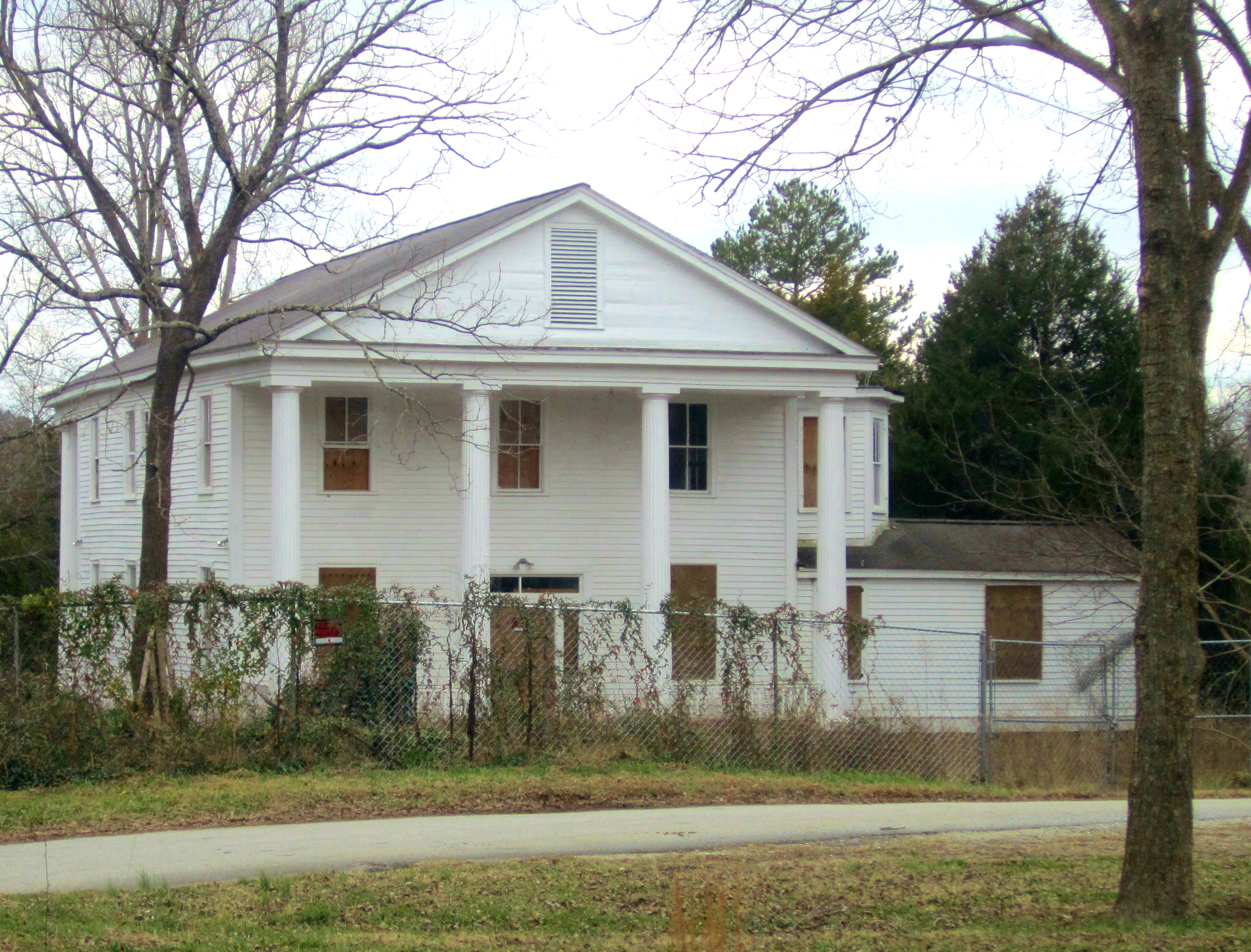
- Bivings-Converse House, January 2012

- Location within South Carolina Location within the United States
- Location: 1 Douglas St., near Glendale, South Carolina
- Coordinates: 34°56′34″N 81°50′12″W
- Area: less than one acre
- Built: c. 1836
- Architectural style: Mid 19th Century Revival, Roman Revival
- NRHP reference No.: 95000638
- Added to NRHP: May 26, 1995

The Bivings-Converse House is a historic house located at 1 Douglas Street near Glendale, Spartanburg County, South Carolina.

== Description and history ==
It was built in about 1836, and is a 2 1/2-story frame mansion in a vernacular Roman Revival (or Greek Revival) style. It has a gable roof and front and rear porches with fluted Roman Doric order columns. About 1890, two Victorian bays and a kitchen wing was added. It was the home of Dr. James Bivings (1781–1869), prominent local textile pioneer, and Dexter Edgar Converse (1829–1899), industrialist, textile entrepreneur, and founder of Converse College.

The house has had a number of structural problems in recent decades, especially since it was vacated in around 1961. The original wooden floors were replaced in the 1970s due to termite damage. The original wooden shingled roof was redone with standard asphalt in 1992, but as of 1995 the structure was vacant and had been subjected to vandalism and water damage. It has remained in a state of disrepair as recently as 2015. The shutters on the exterior have been removed and the windows have been boarded up.

It was listed on the National Register of Historic Places on May 26, 1995.
