= Dexter Edgar Converse =

Textile entrepreneur

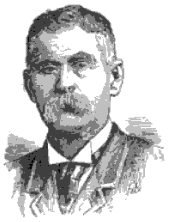
Dexter Edgar Converse

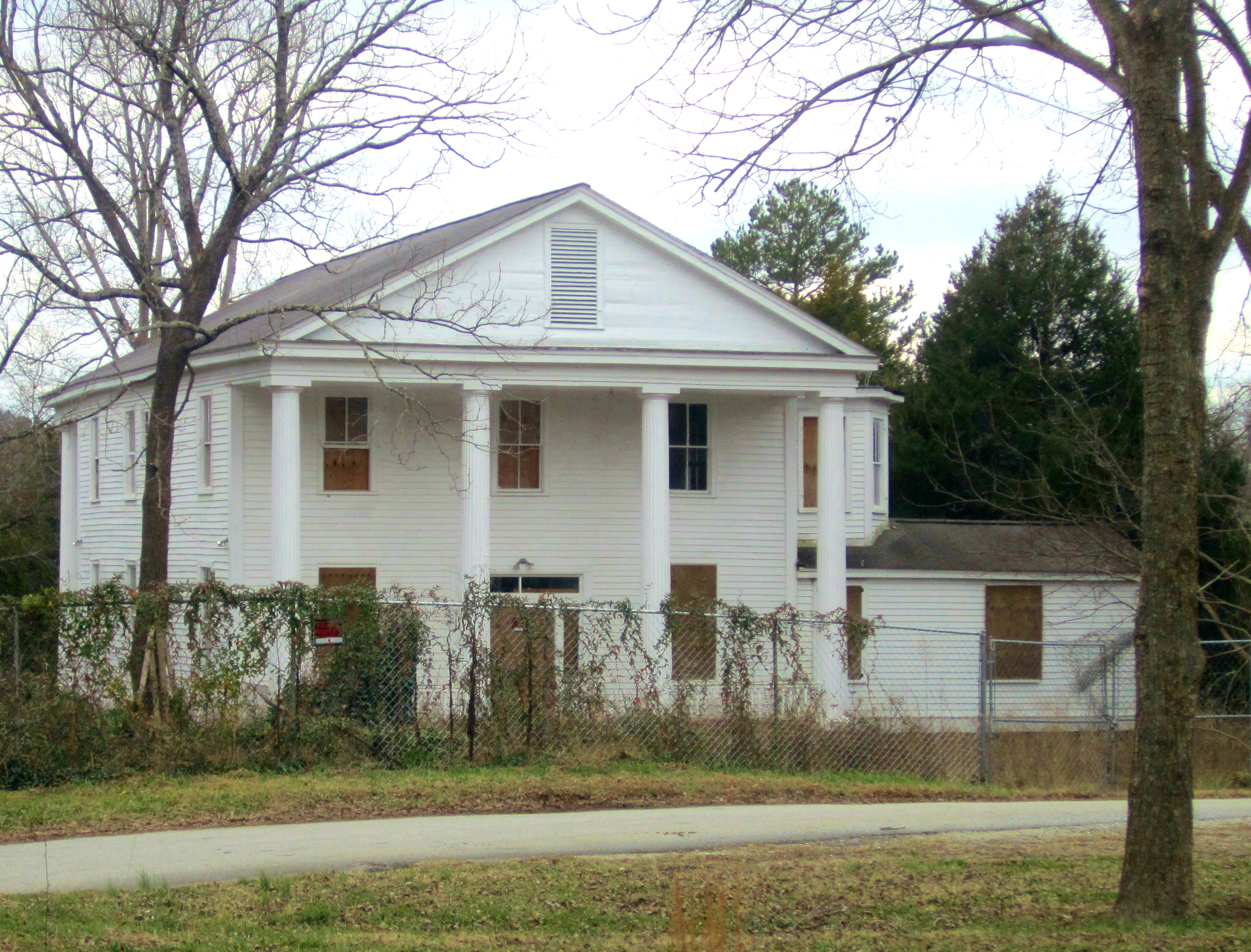
His house, the historic Bivings-Converse House (1836) in Glendale, is listed on the National Register of Historic Places, but is abandoned today

Dexter Edgar Converse (1829–1899) was a textile entrepreneur who was co-founder and namesake of Converse University. Converse was native of Vermont who had moved to Spartanburg prior to the American Civil War and had become a successful pioneer in the cotton mill industry, and served as the head of the Converse University's first board of directors and was among the school's founders and substantial donors.

== Early life ==
Dexter Edgar Converse was born in Swanton, Vermont to Louisa Twichell and Olin Converse, a wool manufacturer. Olin Converse was a descendant of Edward Convers, an early Puritan settler in the Massachusetts Bay Colony, who landed in Salem, Massachusetts in 1629 as part of the John Winthrop Fleet. After his father's death in 1832, Dexter was raised by an uncle in Quebec who was also a woolen manufacturer. When he was twenty-one, Converse went to work at a mill in Cohoes, New York with another uncle, Winslow Twichell, and while there married a cousin, Helen Twichell.

== Move to North Carolina ==
In 1854 the Converses moved to Lincolnton, North Carolina to run a mill there, but moved to Bivingsville (now Glendale, South Carolina in February 1855 but that mill failed shortly afterwards, but Converse was able to buy an ownership stake of the mill at a bankruptcy sale. At the outset of the Civil War, Converse's loyalty to the Confederacy was questioned so he and his brother-in-law, Albert Twichell, enlisted in the Confederate Army, but mill colleagues convinced Converse to remain running the mill and producing cotton products for the Confederate Army. After the War in 1866, he founded D.E. Converse Co. (Glendale Mills) and in 1880, he co-founded the Clifton Manufacturing Co. and acquired shares in the Pacolet, Whitney and Spartan Mills.

== Philanthropy and death ==
In 1891 the Converses left Glendale and moved to Spartanburg, where in 1889 the Converses co-founded the women's college which became Converse University. The campus had a Twichell Auditorium, which was named for his in-laws. Converse died in 1899, and "he was buried in front of Main Hall, as he had requested. Later Helen Converse had her husband's body re-interred in nearby Oakwood Cemetery. Founder's Monument was placed just inside the main entrance to the college." His house, the Bivings-Converse House remains in Glendale, South Carolina and is listed the National Register of Historic Places.
