= Ken Noda =

American pianist (born 1962)

Ken Noda (born October 5, 1962) is an American concert pianist, accompanist, vocal coach, and composer. He began composing music and performing as a concert pianist before the age of 11. He has performed with symphony orchestras throughout the world, and has composed numerous art songs and five operas. He worked as a vocal coach at the Metropolitan Opera from 1991 until retiring from his full time position in July 2019.

== Early life and education ==
Born to Japanese parents in Dobbs Ferry, New York, Noda grew up in Scarborough and was educated at the Hackley School (graduated 1980).

He began studying the piano at age five and was admitted into the Juilliard School on a full scholarship at the age of seven. He has studied piano privately with Daniel Barenboim, Adele Marcus, and Sylvia Rabinof. He studied singing with Beverley Peck Johnson, and for many years was her studio accompanist at Juilliard. In 1986 he was awarded an Avery Fisher Career Grant worth $10,000 (equivalent to $29,372 in 2025).

== Opera compositions ==
Noda composed his first opera, The Canary and the Baseball, at the age of 10, a work which premiered at the Brevard Music Festival on August 18, 1973, and was later staged by the educational wing of the New York City Opera. At the age of 13 he was awarded a grant from the National Endowment for the Arts to compose a three-act opera, The Rivalry (1976), which was his third work in that genre. He has since composed two more operas: The Highwayman (1979) and The Magic Turtle (1980). By the time he was 16 years old he had composed 65 art songs.

== Performance career ==
Noda began performing at a young age, and by the age of 14 he had already appeared as a soloist in concerts with the Baltimore Symphony Orchestra, the Minnesota Orchestra, the St. Louis Symphony, and the New York Philharmonic. Other orchestras he has performed with include the Berlin Philharmonic, the Boston Symphony Orchestra, the Chicago Symphony, the Cleveland Orchestra, the Israel Philharmonic Orchestra, the London Symphony Orchestra, the Los Angeles Philharmonic, the Montreal Symphony Orchestra, the National Symphony Orchestra, the Orchestre de Paris, the Philharmonia Orchestra, and the Vienna Philharmonic among others.

In 1980 Noda performed at Royal Albert Hall for the BBC Proms. In 1982, at the age of 20, he was invited by President Ronald Reagan and First Lady Nancy Reagan to perform alongside violinist Itzhak Perlman in the East Room of the White House. The performance was recorded for the PBS television program In Performance at the White House. In 1983 he closed out the Mostly Mozart Festival at Lincoln Center playing Beethoven's Piano Concerto No. 1 conducted by Leonard Slatkin. In 1989 he performed in concert with the Emerson String Quartet for the Chamber Music Society of Lincoln Center.

In 1991 Noda ceased his performance career after becoming disillusioned with the classical musical world and the role he was playing in it. In an interview with The New York Times several years later, Noda stated the following:

Young people like romance stories and war stories and good-and-evil stories and old movies because their emotional life mostly is and should be fantasy. They put that fantasized emotion into their playing, and it is very convincing. I had an amazing capacity for imagining these feelings, and that's part of what talent is. But it dries up, in everyone. That's why so many prodigies have midlife crises in their late teens or early 20s. If our imagination is not replenished with experience, the ability to reproduce these feelings in one's playing gradually diminishes.

After halting his performance career, Noda joined the staff of the Metropolitan Opera as a vocal coach and administrator in 1991 and has since only performed rarely as a soloist. He continues to perform with regularity as an accompanist to singers in recitals in New York City. Performers he has accompanied include, among others:

- Roberto Alagna
- June Anderson
- Kathleen Battle
- Hildegard Behrens
- Stephen Costello
- Danielle de Niese
- Alexandra Deshorties
- Maria Ewing
- Lauren Flanigan
- Renée Fleming
- Angela Gheorghiu
- Anthony Dean Griffey
- Andrea Gruber
- Marilyn Horne
- Ying Huang
- Mariusz Kwiecień
- Aprile Millo
- Kurt Moll
- Brian Mulligan
- Jessye Norman
- Lisette Oropesa
- Sean Panikkar
- Ailyn Pérez
- Matthew Polenzani
- Russell Thomas
- Dawn Upshaw
- Benita Valente
- Deborah Voigt

== Educator and work at the Metropolitan Opera ==
Since 1999 Noda has taught on the faculty at the Marlboro Music School and Festival. He also spent four summers teaching at the Renata Scotto Opera Academy and gives master classes in opera at the Yale School of Music and the Juilliard School. He currently serves on the staff of the Metropolitan Opera as an instructor to singers in the Lindemann Young Artist Development Program. He has also served as a judge for the final round of the Metropolitan Opera National Council Auditions. He began working at the Met as a vocal coach in 1991.
