= Nicole Cabell =

American opera singer

Nicole Cabell (born October 17, 1977) is an American opera singer. She is best known as the 2005 winner of the BBC Cardiff Singer of the World Competition.

Cabell was born in Panorama City, California. Her grandfather, Luther Lanier, was the first African American Chief in the Sheriff's Department in Los Angeles. She is of African American, Korean and Caucasian ancestry, and was brought up in the California beach town of Ventura. As a child, she did not listen to classical music, but she did play the flute in her junior high school band. She and a classmate used to play basketball together and would "imitate opera singers". Her mother encouraged her to join the school choir and she tried out for a school musical and was a success.

== Early life and education ==
At the age of 15, Cabell began to notice that "People obviously can hear something, even if I can't", she said. "That's sort of how it's been: I've been walking through doors as they've been presented to me".

She had three years of private singing lessons in high school with soprano voice teacher Linda Brice (MM, Indiana University School of Music) and voice instructor and coach Vincent Sorisio (MM, California State University, Northridge; BM Indiana University School of Music.) It was with Sorisio that, at the age of 18 in 1997, she took 2nd prize in the NATS competition for the Western Region. Subsequently Sorisio continued to teach Miss Cabell; he prepared her for her auditions for various music schools and public performances. At Eastman Nicole studied with John Maloy.

She then entered the Juilliard School, but only for a very brief time, as she had been asked to join the Lyric Opera Center for American Artists at the Lyric Opera of Chicago where she remained for three years. During this period of time the Center's then-director, Richard Pearlman, famous soprano and Director of Vocal Studies Gianna Rolandi, and opera legend Marilyn Horne were her mentors.

Cabell continued to study with Rolandi, who was the director of the newly renamed Ryan Opera Center. Cabell returned home to Ventura and performed for the Ventura Music Festival, which included a reunion with pianist Vincent Sorisio in a performance for her former school, Ventura High School in 2008.

== Debuts ==
After winning the BBC Cardiff Singer of the World competition in June 2005, Cabell made her London début on August 2, 2006 at The Proms, singing Benjamin Britten's Les Illuminations, with Sir Andrew Davis conducting the BBC Symphony Orchestra. She made her Royal Opera House début at the Barbican as Princesse Eudoxie in a concert performance of Halévy's La Juive, on September 19, 2006, conducted by Daniel Oren. She also sang the role of Adina in L'elisir d'amore in Montpellier.

She was planning to make her debut at the Deutsche Oper in Berlin in mid-December 2006, but due to the last-minute indisposition of soprano Angela Gheorghiu, Cabell was asked to step in, and her debut took place somewhat earlier - on 7 December - as Juliette in Gounod's Roméo et Juliette alongside Neil Shicoff. She had previously sung the role at the Spoleto Festival USA in May 2006. Cabell made her debut with the Metropolitan Opera on December 22, 2008, singing the role of Pamina in The Magic Flute.

In 2007, she gave her first solo recital at St John's Smith Square in London, sang the title role in Donizetti's Imelda de' Lambertazzi at the Queen Elizabeth Hall, and Musetta in La bohème in Munich; during the Santa Fe Opera's 2007 summer festival season; at the Washington National Opera; and at the Lyric Opera of Chicago.

== Repertoire ==
Cabell's repertoire includes Pamina (Die Zauberflöte), Juliette (Roméo et Juliette), The Countess (Le nozze di Figaro), Adina (L'elisir d'amore), The Vixen (The Cunning Little Vixen), Musetta (La bohème), Lauretta and La Ciesca (Gianni Schicchi), Clara (Porgy and Bess), La Princesse in Ravel's L'enfant et les sortilèges, La Femme in Poulenc's La voix humaine, Miss Jessel in The Turn of the Screw and Arsamenes in Xerxes. She has recently added the role of Ilia in Mozart's Idomeneo and will be performing the role of Micaëla in "Carmen" at the Chicago Lyric Opera in the 2010–2011 season.

Her concert repertoire includes Mahler's Symphonies No. 2 and 4, Poulenc's Gloria, Orff's Carmina Burana, Beethoven's Symphony No. 9, Tippett's A Child of Our Time, André Previn's Honey and Rue and Henryk Górecki's Symphony of Sorrowful Songs.

Cabell has collaborated with major conductors such as Sir Andrew Davis, James Conlon, Daniel Barenboim, Antonio Pappano, André Previn and Sir Raymond Leppard.

In 2011 she sang Donna Elvira in Cologne and Berlin, and was invited to be a commentator on the 2011 Cardiff Singer of the World competition.

During the 2012 festival season at the Santa Fe Opera, Cabell sang the role of Leila in Georges Bizet's The Pearl Fishers.

== Recordings ==
Nicole Cabell is signed to a recording contract with Decca. Her first recording, released in 2006, was of Gershwin's Porgy and Bess, conducted by John Mauceri, while her first solo recital album, Soprano, is of arias in French, Italian and English. It was released in 2007 and received two awards: the Georg Solti Prize Orphée d'Or 2007 by the Académie du Disque Lyrique for a promising recording career and The Gramophone Magazine's Editor's Choice in May 2007.

She sang the title role in the 2007 recording of Donizetti's Imelda de' Lambertazzi for Opera Rara, conducted by Mark Elder with the Orchestra of the Age of Enlightenment.

She appeared in a filmed version of Puccini's La Bohème as Musetta for Deutsche Grammophon, alongside Anna Netrebko and Rolando Villazón with the Bavarian Radio Symphony Orchestra conducted by Bertrand de Billy. The film debuted on PBS in December 2009.
