= Sheil =

Sheil (Irish: Ó Siail) is a surname. Notable people with the surname include:

- Ainslie Sheil (born 1933), rugby union player who represented Australia
- Bernard James Sheil (1888–1969), Auxiliary Roman Catholic Bishop of Chicago
- Edward Sheil (1851–1915), Irish nationalist politician
- Ernie Sheil (1906–1970), Australian rules footballer
- Glen Sheil (1929–2008), Australian politician representing the National Party
- Sir John Sheil (born 1938), Lord Justice of Appeal in Northern Ireland from 2005 to 2007
- Justin Sheil (1803–1871), Irish diplomat and army officer
- Kate Lyn Sheil, American independent film actress
- Kate Sheil, Australian stage and television actress
- Laurence Sheil (1815–1872), Irish Franciscan friar, third Roman Catholic Bishop of Adelaide
- Martha Sheil, American operatic soprano
- Norman Sheil (1932–2018), racing cyclist
- Richard Lalor Sheil (1791–1851), Irish politician, writer and orator
- Wally Sheil (1929–2002), American education administrator and politician from Jersey City, New Jersey

== See also ==
- Seil
- Sheila
