= In Performance at the White House =

American television series of performances from the White House

- Country of origin: United States
- Original language: English

Original release
- Network: PBS
- Release: 1978

In Performance at the White House is a PBS television series of performances from the White House, the residence of the president of the United States. The series began in 1978.

The first series was broadcast in 1978 during the presidency of Jimmy Carter. The inaugural series consisted of five hour long programs of performances recorded in the East Room.

The ballet dancers Mikhail Baryshnikov and Patricia McBride, the pianist Vladimir Horowitz, the opera singer Leontyne Price, the cellist Mstislav Rostropovich, and the guitarist Andres Segovia all appeared in Series 1.

An August 1988 episode of In Performance at the White House during the presidency of Ronald Reagan featured the composer Marvin Hamlisch, with the cast of A Chorus Line, entertainers Shirley Jones, Stubby Kaye, Lee Roy Reams, and the Marine Band.

Paul McCartney received the Gershwin Prize for Popular Song from President Barack Obama during a 2009 episode of the show. McCartney performed at the event which also featured appearances by Elvis Costello, Dave Grohl, Herbie Hancock, Emmylou Harris, Faith Hill, Jonas Brothers, Lang Lang, Corinne Bailey Rae, and Jack White, Stevie Wonder.

== Partial list of episodes ==
=== 1981/82 series ===
- Rudolf Serkin and Ida Levin
- Gene Kelly
- Beverly Sills
- Merle Haggard

=== 1982/83 series ===
The violinist Itzhak Perlman was the host of the four episodes of the 1982/83 season.

- "Itzhak Perlman" — Perlman performed with pianist Ken Noda including Igor Stravinsky's Suite Italienne, Wolfgang Amadeus Mozart's Fantasia in D minor and Ballade No. 1 by Frédéric Chopin.
- "Jazz" — featured the trumpeter Dizzy Gillespie, saxophonist Stan Getz, and pianist Chick Corea. The singer Diane Schuur and the trumpeter Jon Faddis also performed.
- "Juilliard/Muir String Quartet" — Performances of chamber music by the Juilliard and the Muir String Quartet. Perlman also performed with both groups.
- "Mary Martin and John Raitt" — The musical theatre performers Mary Martin and John Raitt performed songs from Broadway musicals on the lawn of the White House.

=== 1983/84 series ===
- Artists from the Metropolitan Opera's Young Artist's Development Program

=== 1983 Christmas special ===
- "An Evening of Spirituals and Gospel Music" — It was hosted by Leontyne Price and recorded at the Shiloh Baptist Church in Washington, D.C.. The choir of Howard University appeared alongside Price; other performers included Lillias White, Kevette Cartledge, David Weatherspoon, and the Richard Smallwood Singers. President Ronald Reagan and his wife Nancy attended, and sat in the front pew of the church.

=== 1986/87 series ===
- Included three performances entitled "Tribute to American Music" which included Marvin Hamlisch, Liza Minnelli and Vic Damone, among others.

=== 1998 ===
- "Savion Glover: Stomp, Slide and Swing"

=== 1999 ===
- "CeCe Winans, Glorious Gospel"

=== 2009 ===
- "Fiesta Latina" — The episode featured Marc Anthony, Jimmy Smits, Pete Escovedo, Gloria Estefan, José Feliciano, George Lopez, Thalía, Tito El Bambino, the Bachata music group Aventura, and the Chicano rock band Los Lobos, with Sheila E. leading the house band. Aired on October 15, 2009.
- The 2009 incarnation was entitled as "Paul McCartney: The Gershwin Prize" and featured performances by Paul McCartney, Elvis Costello, Dave Grohl, Herbie Hancock, Emmylou Harris, Faith Hill, Jonas Brothers, Lang Lang, Corinne Bailey Rae, and Jack White, Stevie Wonder. Aired on July 28, 2010. Glen Levy of TIME wrote for the episode, "The White House has never hosted a cooler evening."

=== 2012 ===
- "Red, White and Blues" — A celebration of blues music for Black History Month with B.B. King, Jeff Beck, Gary Clark, Jr., Shemekia Copeland, Buddy Guy, Warren Haynes, Mick Jagger, Keb' Mo', Trombone Shorty, Susan Tedeschi and Derek Trucks. The show was hosted by Taraji P. Henson. Booker T. Jones served as the bandleader and musical director.

=== 2015 ===
- "A Celebration of American Creativity" celebrated the 50th anniversary of the founding of the National Endowment for the Humanities and the National Endowment for the Arts. The show featured Carol Burnett, Queen Latifah, Smokey Robinson, James Taylor and Usher. The show also featured a reading of E.L. Doctorow's "Civil War Letters". The show featured the first hip-hop performance in the In Performance at the White House series.

== Awards ==
=== Primetime Emmy awards and Primetime Creative Arts Emmy Awards ===
- Main article: Primetime Emmy awards and Primetime Creative Arts Emmy Awards

Year	Category	Recipient	Results	Ref
1984	Outstanding Individual Achievement - Classical Music/Dance programming	Leontyne Price In Performance at the White House: An Evening of Spirituals and Gospel Music	Won	
2010	Outstanding Music Direction	Sheila E., Music Director for In Performance at the White House: Fiesta Latina	Nominated	
2010	Outstanding Directing for a Variety, Music or Comedy Special	Ron de Moraes, Director for In Performance at the White House: A Celebration of Music from the Civil Rights Movement	Nominated	
2012	Outstanding Music Direction	Steven A. Gibson, Music Director for Country Music (In Performance at the White House)	Nominated	
2016	Outstanding Music Direction	Rickey Minor and Christian McBride, Music Direction Smithsonian Salutes Ray Charles: In Performance at the White House	Nominated	
