= Beverley Peck Johnson =

American singer

- Born: Beverley Peck; June 12, 1904; Portland, Oregon, U.S.
- Died: January 20, 2001 (aged 96); New York City, New York, U.S.
- Education: Ellison-White Conservatory
- Occupations: Vocal coach; musician

Beverley Peck Johnson (June 12, 1904 – January 20, 2001) was an American voice teacher, soprano, and pianist who taught on the faculties of several institutions, including Manhattan School of Music and The Juilliard School. Her pupils included several prominent opera singers, actors, and entertainers, including sopranos Renée Fleming, Renata Tebaldi, Anna Moffo, tenor Anthony Dean Griffey, and actors Madeline Kahn, Kevin Kline, Constance Towers, and Juilliard voice professor Cynthia Hoffmann among others. Music critic Anthony Tommasini wrote that "Johnson was particularly valued by students for a keen ability to find individual solutions to their problems."

== Life and career ==
Born Beverley Peck in Portland, Oregon, she was the daughter of Hartwig O. Peck and Cecilia W. Peck. She grew up in Walla Walla, Washington, and earned degrees in both speech and drama from the Ellison-White Conservatory of Music in Portland. Shortly thereafter she moved to New York where she began studies in piano with Andre Kostelanetz, and was soon active as an accompanist for singers and ensembles in NYC.

Peck studied voice with one of the singers she accompanied in NYC, tenor Hardesty Johnson, who became her husband. Her husband was a faculty member at the Juilliard School and she served as his studio accompanist during lessons and for masterclasses. She often performed in joint recital with her husband as both a pianist and a soprano vocalist. She accompanied other well known singers as well in concerts during her career. Hardesty Johnson died in 1952.

In 1960, Johnson joined the voice faculty of the School of Sacred Music at the Union Theological Seminary where she taught until 1965. She joined the faculty at the Juilliard School in 1964 where she taught until her death 37 years later. She concurrently worked on the faculty of the Aspen Music Festival and School; as an adjunct professor at the Conservatory of Music at Brooklyn College; and as a professor at the Manhattan School of Music from 1982–1989.

In addition to working as a University professor, Peck taught out of a private studio. One of her notable pupils was actor Kevin Kline who began studying with her to prepare his voice for the music in the 1983 film version of The Pirates of Penzance. Kline stated in an interview that Peck "was very, very strict about protecting the voice", and that he must choose between cigarettes and her if he was a smoker. Peck's other private students included Sarah Atereth, Ara Berberian, Blythe Danner, Mignon Dunn, Tammy Grimes, Madeline Kahn, Evelyn Lear, Thomas Paul, Rita Shane, Renata Tebaldi, Constance Towers, Giorgio Tozzi, and Theodor Uppman.

Johnson also had a widely known reputation of helping voices experiencing distress. She was hired to assist President Lyndon B. Johnson in his post-operative recovery from the surgical removal of vocal fold nodules while he was in office. She was also sought by Anna Moffo when the renowned soprano began experiencing vocal difficulties in the 1970s.

In a 1977 interview with The New York Times, Johnson said following about her work with Moffo:

Anna's voice has been there all the time. It's just that somebody along the way forgot to tell her that you can't run a Rolls-Royce without gas in it. She has one of the really natural beautiful voices, like Tebaldi. But she never had any true physiological technique to fall back on. She had no breath support; there was no resonance in the lower or middle voice. Only air was coming out. So what we tried to do for the past two years is wash away the crud and build up her stamina. A singer, like an athlete, has to have every workable muscle trained.

== Death ==
Johnson died in Manhattan in 2001 at the age of 96. At the time leading up to her death she was closely administered by her pupils Anthony Dean Griffey and Renée Fleming. Fleming described Griffey as "like a surrogate son to Beverley", and recounted how her final lesson with her teacher was just a month before Johnson's death. Some of her pupils became celebrated voice teachers and accompanists in their own right, including Shane, Robert White (tenor), Margot Garrett, Ken Noda, Cynthia Hoffmann, Martile Rowland, and Brian Zeger. She was adamantly opposed to having her photo taken, and The New York Times was unable to locate or obtain a photo of her at the time of her death.
