= Harolyn Blackwell =

American opera singer and actress

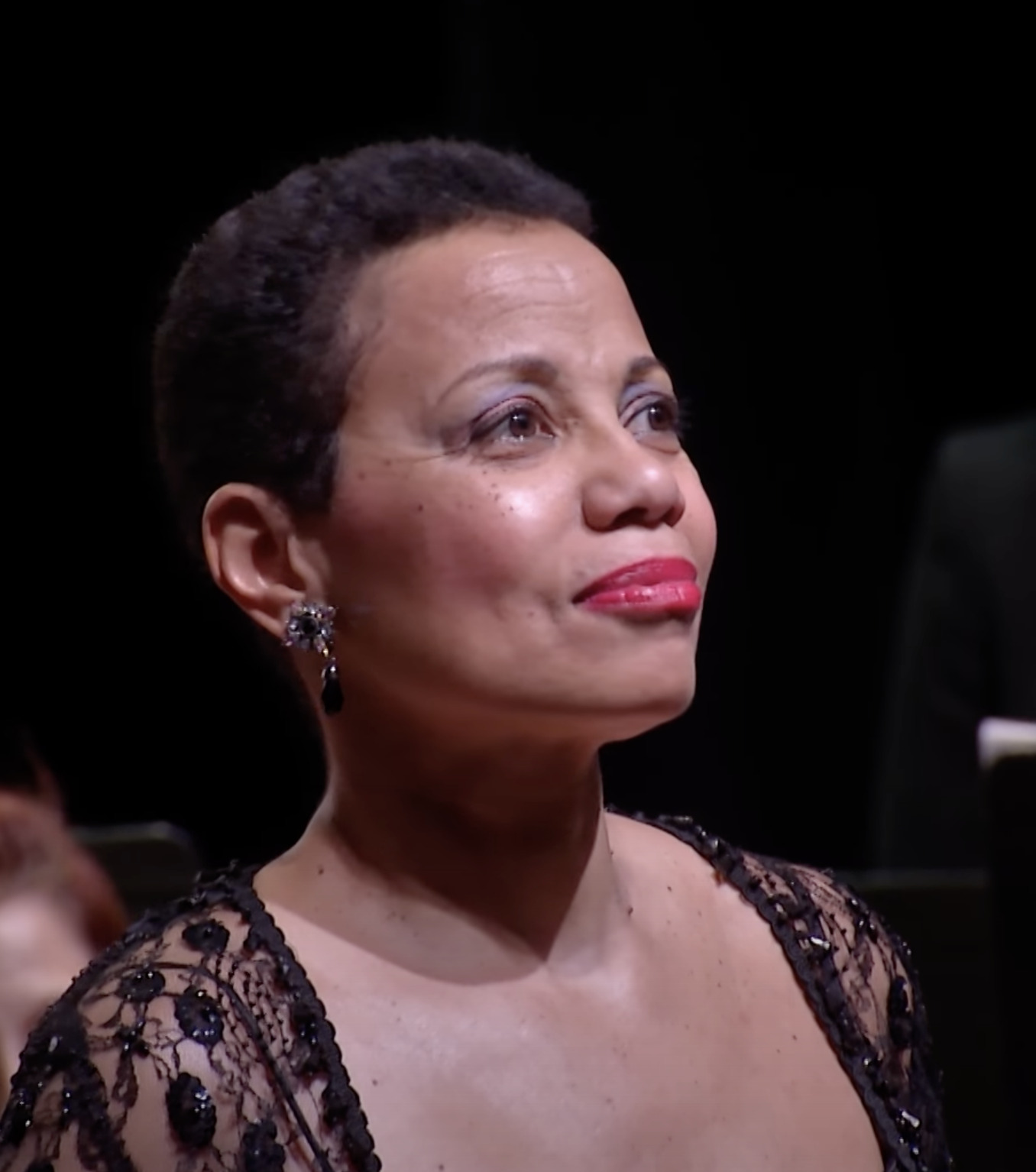
- Born: November 23, 1955 (age 70); Washington, DC, United States
- Education: The Catholic University of America
- Occupations: Singer and actress
- Known for: Musical theater and opera performance, and teaching voice
- Spouse: Peter Greer (m. 1991)
- Website: www.harolynblackwell.com

Harolyn Blackwell (born November 23, 1955) is an American lyric coloratura soprano who has performed in many of the world's finest opera houses, concert halls, and theaters in operas, oratorios, recitals, and Broadway musicals. Initially known for her work within musical theater during the early 1980s, Blackwell moved into the field of opera and by 1987 had established herself as an artist within the soubrette repertoire in many major opera houses both in the United States and in Europe. Feeling that she was being "type cast" into one particular kind of role, Blackwell strove to establish herself within the lyric coloratura repertoire beginning in the mid-1990s. With the aid of such companies as Seattle Opera, Blackwell successfully made this move and is now an interpreter of such roles as Lucia in Donizetti's Lucia di Lammermoor and Olympia in Offenbach's Les contes d'Hoffman. She has also periodically returned to musical theater performances throughout her career in staged productions, concert work, and recitals. Blackwell is known for her interpretations and recordings of the works of Leonard Bernstein.

== Early life and education ==
The daughter of Harold and Elaine Blackwell, Harolyn Blackwell was born in Washington, D.C. on November 23, 1955. The eldest of five children in the Blackwell family, both of her parents were teachers and active participants in the Civil Rights Movement. Her father, Harold Blackwell (for whom she was named), was also a redevelopment specialist with the United States Department of Housing and Urban Development in Washington, D.C. for many years, and her mother taught physical education and health at the University of the District of Columbia.

Blackwell first became interested in music through the influence of her fourth-grade teacher, Nancy Notargiacomo, who eventually became her voice and piano teacher when she was 10 years old. She also credits her high school choral director for encouraging her to pursue a music career. In a 2003 interview, Blackwell recalled: "I did not come from a musical family. I had a fourth grade teacher that introduced me to music and I sang at the Catholic church. In high school I started doing musicals − The Sound of Music, Brigadoon, Oliver!, and so forth. I thought maybe this would be what I would pursue after high school, although even in my senior year in high school I had doubts. I wanted to go into history or fashion design. But, I had a wonderful choral director who said 'no, your calling is music,' and she convinced me."

Blackwell attended Catholic University, where she majored in vocal music education and also spent time in activities and classes related to the university's drama and musical theater programs. Blackwell said, "I wasn't quite sure whether I wanted to pursue classical or musical theater. I knew that whichever I chose, I wanted to have a classical training. It was important to me to have the technical expertise as well as also the theory and understanding of classical music. Catholic University was the best of both possible worlds, because they had a very strong drama department as well as a very good music department. They were next door, so I spent quite a bit of time going back and forth between the drama department and the music department." After graduating with her undergraduate degree in 1977, Blackwell taught music in two parochial schools while simultaneously continuing her vocal studies on the graduate level at Catholic University, where she appeared two opera roles: Mrs Gobineau in The Medium and Giannetta in L'elisir d'amore. She graduated with a Master's in Vocal Performance in 1980.

== Early career ==
Blackwell's first professional engagements were with Toby Orenstein's the Young Columbians with whom she performed in 1976–1977 singing songs such as "After the Ball", "Summertime" and "Smoke Gets in Your Eyes". In 1979, while preparing a recital program for her master's degree, Blackwell auditioned for the Broadway revival of West Side Story. Impressed with her audition, Leonard Bernstein hand picked her for the role of Francisca (formerly named Consuela in the original 1957 production) and the understudy for Maria in the 1980 revival. As Francisca, Blackwell sang the song Somewhere from the orchestra pit during the final scene of the musical. For the next two-and-a-half years she toured with the show, gaining skills no operatic training could have provided. Blackwell said, "I learned about characterization, how you went about becoming that person", she said. "I learned stamina, how to do eight shows a week. And I learned to make the stage my home, where I felt 100 percent comfortable." At the show's premiere, critics remarked how similar Blackwell sounded to opera singer Reri Grist who originated the role of Consuela. Coincidentally, Blackwell met and befriended Grist in 1985 when she coached Blackwell for her European debut as Oscar in Verdi's Un ballo in maschera with the Hamburg State Opera. She repeated that role the following year at the Lyric Opera of Chicago.

In 1981, Blackwell auditioned for and was accepted into both the Houston Grand Opera and Lyric Opera of Chicago young artist programs. Having to choose between the two, Blackwell decided to go to Chicago. After singing with the company in small parts for a year, Blackwell left the program and moved back to New York to study vocal technique more intensely with Shirlee Emmons. She went on to win the Metropolitan Opera National Council Auditions in 1983. Up to this point Blackwell was still uncertain as to whether she would continue pursuing an opera career or go back to musical theater. With winning the Met Auditions, however, her career path became decidedly reoriented towards opera. "It fit so naturally", she explains of the then new foray into opera, "it was as if I'd put on a pair of old shoes." Following her win, Blackwell continued in her apprenticeship at the Lyric Opera of Chicago for a year. In 1987 she made her Metropolitan Opera debut as Poussette in Manon. Since then Blackwell's career has flourished. She has appeared several more times with the Metropolitan Opera in productions such as Un ballo in maschera, Le nozze di Figaro, Die Fledermaus, and Werther among others.

In 1989, Blackwell performed and recorded the role of Clara in a critically acclaimed production of Gershwin's Porgy and Bess with the Glyndebourne Festival Opera. The recording won a Grammy Award and Blackwell performed the aria "Summertime" at the 1990 Grammy Awards. That performance was praised highly and raised Blackwell's profile as an opera singer to watch. In 1991, Blackwell made her debut with the San Francisco Opera as Zerlina in Mozart's Don Giovanni. That same year she gave a highly praised performance as Oscar in Verdi's Un ballo in maschera with the Metropolitan Opera opposite Luciano Pavarotti. The performance was video taped and subsequently aired on PBS' Great Performances. Blackwell appeared on Great Performances again in 1993 in the concert Sondheim — A Celebration at Carnegie Hall where she performed music from Stephen Sondheim's Sweeney Todd. The concert has subsequently been released on DVD and CD.

Throughout the early 1990s, Blackwell remained active in performances with opera companies throughout the United States and Europe. In 1991, she portrayed Susanna in The Marriage of Figaro with the Canadian Opera Company. In 1994, Blackwell replaced Kathleen Battle as Marie in La fille du régiment at the Metropolitan Opera for the entire run when Battle was fired from the production for unprofessional conduct. This has inevitably caused critics to compare the two singers, and indeed both women have played many of the same roles and share a similar vocal quality. In a 2003 interview, Blackwell said: "Kathleen has been very supportive and very good to me over my career. Mattiwilda Dobbs, Reri Grist and Kathy were basically the predecessors for me and I really am grateful to those women, especially with my particular fach. I mean, singing Aïda or Leonora is one thing, but the lyric repertory roles are not star vehicles. It just doesn't happen and I think these women have really helped in that respect."

== Later career ==
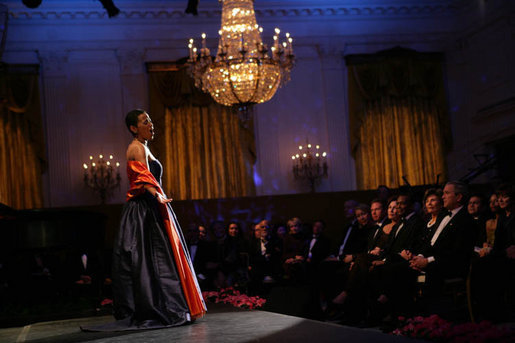
Blackwell performs in the East Room of the White House during a dinner in honor of the Dance Theatre of Harlem on February 6, 2006. President George W. Bush and First Lady Laura Bush are in attendance.

In the mid-1990s, Blackwell moved away from the soubrette repertoire and began to sing almost exclusively lyric coloratura roles. Instrumental in boosting her profile within this repertoire was Seattle Opera under the direction of Speight Jenkins. Blackwell first worked with the company in 1990 in the role of Marie in La fille du régiment. Impressed with her voice, the company rehired Blackwell periodically throughout the 1990s and 2000s giving her opportunities to sing new repertoire such as the title roles in Donizetti's Lucia di Lammermoor and Delibes' Lakmé. She has also sung Norina in Donizetti's Don Pasquale, Gilda in Verdi's Rigoletto, and Olympia in Les contes d'Hoffman with the company among other roles. Positive reviews from these performances led to Blackwell's engagement during the late 1990s and 2000s in similar repertoire with many other companies to great acclaim including Teatro Colón de Buenos Aires, Opéra de Nice, Florida Grand Opera, Tulsa Opera, and the Netherlands Opera.

In 1997, Blackwell returned to Broadway to star as Cunegonde in Bernstein's Candide. Although Blackwell earned rave reviews for her singing, the production as a whole was not well received. Most critics blamed the productions flaws on Hal Prince's interpretation and direction that caused a lack of overall focus within the show. Others have blamed the problems on inherent flaws within the musical's book. Blackwell can be heard on the recording of the 1997 revival. Blackwell had also previously recorded several other works by Bernstein the year before on her solo album Blackwell Sings Bernstein that was released on the RCA label. The album features a guest performance by Vanessa L. Williams as Anita in selections from West Side Story.

Blackwell has also performed in many acclaimed concert series and given many lauded recitals over the years. She has performed at London's Wigmore Hall, Carnegie Hall's Weill Recital Hall, The San Francisco Performance Series at the Herbst Theatre, the Morgan Library, the Kennedy Center, and the Ambassador Foundation Performing Arts Series in Los Angeles. In 2002-2003 she toured the United States giving concerts with Florence Quivar. She has also performed for several notable figures. In 1999 Blackwell was invited to perform at the Vatican for Pope John Paul II's 80th birthday. In 2006, she performed a concert in honor of the Dance Theatre of Harlem at the White House with President George W. Bush and Laura Bush in attendance.

Other major national and international opera companies and festivals that Blackwell has performed with include: the Washington National Opera, Canadian Opera Company, Aix-en-Provence Festival, Opera Orchestra of New York, and New York City's Mostly Mozart Festival among others.

Also an accomplished singer of the concert repertoire, she has performed with the Pittsburgh Symphony, the Cincinnati Symphony, the Dallas Symphony, the Seattle Symphony, the New York Philharmonic, the Munich Philharmonic, the Oslo Philharmonic, the New Jersey Symphony, the NHK Symphony Orchestra, the Boston Pops and the London Symphony Orchestra. Her concert work has included performances of Samuel Barber's Knoxville: Summer of 1915, Brahms's Requiem, Handel's Messiah, Haydn's Die Schöpfung, André Previn's Honey and Rue, Mahler's Symphony No.4, Mozart's Requiem, and Orff's Carmina Burana among many others.

Throughout her career Blackwell has performed under some of the world's finest conductors including Herbert Blomstedt, James Conlon, Christoph von Dohnányi, Plácido Domingo, Charles Dutoit, Erich Kunzel, James Levine, Andrew Litton, Zdeněk Mácal, Kurt Masur, Trevor Pinnock, André Previn, Simon Rattle, Gerard Schwarz, Leonard Slatkin, and David Zinman.

== Opera roles ==
To date these are some of the roles Blackwell has performed on the stages of major opera houses:

- Adele, Die Fledermaus (Johann Strauss II)
- Barbarina, The Marriage of Figaro (Mozart)
- Blondchen, Die Entführung aus dem Serail (Mozart)
- Clara, Porgy and Bess (Gershwin)
- Constance, Dialogues of the Carmelites (Poulenc)
- Despina, Così fan tutte (Mozart)
- Gilda, Rigoletto (Verdi)
- Giulietta, I Capuleti e i Montecchi (Bellini)
- Lakmé, Lakmé (Delibes)
- Lucia, Lucia di Lammermoor (Donizetti)
- Marie, La fille du régiment (Donizetti)
- Marzelline, Fidelio (Beethoven)

- Nanetta, Falstaff (Verdi)
- Norina, Don Pasquale (Donizetti)
- Olympia, Les contes d'Hoffmann (Offenbach)
- Oscar, Un ballo in maschera (Verdi)
- Poussette, Manon (Massenet)
- Sophie, Der Rosenkavalier (Richard Strauss)
- Sophie, Werther (Massenet)
- Susanna, The Marriage of Figaro (Mozart)
- Valencienne, Die lustige Witwe (Franz Lehár)
- Xenia, Boris Godunov (Mussorgsky)
- Zdenka, Arabella (Richard Strauss)
- Zerlina, Don Giovanni (Mozart)

== Educator ==
Blackwell has always seen herself as an educator as well as an opera singer, partly because of her roots as a music teacher. She recalls about her years spent teaching in the late 1970s, "I taught at two parochial schools, one in Washington, D.C., and the other in Bethesda, Maryland, and I had to fight for my children to be able to go down to the Kennedy Center to see an opera. I got the English teacher, the history teacher and the art teacher to come together and work on this project where we all talked about the music, the art, the history and the literature from the period."

This interest in education continued into her opera career. For many years, Blackwell participated in a program called the "Affiliate Artists" where she went into the community and talked to people one-on-one to educate them about and inspire interest in opera. Blackwell says, "We don't have audience participation anymore, partly because of being raised on television. We have become an audience that receives entertainment in a passive way. I think in order to participate you have to have knowledge and knowledge means you have to take the time to sit down and educate. When you are able to communicate with people and show them you're just another human being with a gift, it makes all the difference. My gift happens to be singing. When you go to an opera you see so many people, but you don't have an opportunity to have that one-on-one contact and that's what was so great about that program."

In 2002, Blackwell's work as an educator took on a more official form when she became an adjunct faculty member at the Peabody Conservatory in Baltimore. She taught master classes at the school for four years. Blackwell has also been invited as a guest instructor at several universities and conservatories throughout the United States. She currently teaches on the voice faculties of Manhattan School of Music, Barnard College and New York University.

== Personal life ==
Blackwell has been married to businessman Peter Greer since 1991. A Catholic, she has stated about her voice that "God had given me this gift. I want to use it well."

== Vocal appreciation and criticism ==
At the beginning of her career, Blackwell played mostly soubrette roles and has since moved more into the lyric coloratura soprano repertoire. Blackwell has commented that she felt opera houses were initially uncertain as to how to cast her because of her musical theater background. She said, "They saw me in the lighter repertoire and my voice teacher and I saw me in the lyric repertoire." In addition, her small frame and 5'1" stature in combination with girlish looks made her a perfect physical casting choice for soubrette roles. It wasn't until Blackwell studied in Busseto with Carlo Bergonzi, Renata Tebaldi, and Sylvia Barrachi in the late 1980s that she finally was given direction into the lyric coloratura repertoire. Blackwell recalls: "At the end of the program Mrs. Barrachi and Renata Tebaldi sat down with me and told me what roles I should sing if I wanted to have a major career. Having those two women take the time to talk to me made a big difference. I have always been the type of individual that takes all the information and then makes the decision that's appropriate for me. I can be very stubborn. I really do have to credit those two women for saving me."

However, it took some time before Blackwell felt her voice was ready to tackle these coloratura roles. She has remarked that her own voice has gone through periods of change. "Your voice changes so much; it changes at 17 or 18, and again in your mid-20s and in your 30s. A voice is constantly changing and evolving." Critics have particularly noted a shift in Blackwell's voice in the mid-1990s, commenting on its fuller sound. In 1995, the Seattle Post Intelligencer said of Blackwell: "Her lyric soprano has grown in size. Always flexible, the voice is now richer and fuller." This change in her voice tracks with her move into more mature repertoire in the mid to late 1990s.

Blackwell has received consistent positive praise throughout her career. About her New York City recital debut at Carnegie Hall in 1987 noted music critic Will Crutchfield wrote, "The voice is first rate: a small, clean high soprano that goes from high to low and loud to soft with rare unity and poise. It is beautiful in quality and she has the special ability to take it down to the very tiniest pianissimo with complete control. Her linguistic grasp was secure, and her intonation likewise... Miss Blackwell's personality on the stage is warm and likable, and in one of Roland Hayes's spiritual arrangements she showed an unexpected comic gift." In 1994, the New York Times said, "Her performances at the Met since her 1987 debut as Pousette in "Manon" have won consistent praise, both for the purity and suppleness of her voice and for her poised, persuasive acting." A 2000 article in the Seattle Post Intelligencer in review of her performance of the title role in Lucia di Lammermoor said, "Vocally and dramatically, this is a role that is perfectly suited to Blackwell; the voice is the right size, the right timbre and has the right flexibility for this coloratura challenge. Agile and clear, her soprano soars and floats like an eagle on an updraft. The two big E-flats in the Mad Scene were right on target." In 2001 Opera News said, "Harolyn Blackwell sang beautifully, with crisp, unfussy diction... She sang with a satisfying lyricism, and her "Summertime" was mesmerizing." A 2005 Seattle Times review of her portrayal of Olympia in Les contes d'Hoffman said: "Another scene-stealer was Harolyn Blackwell, who brought down the house with her perfect coloratura fireworks."

== Awards ==
Blackwell is a recipient of numerous awards and honors, one of which provided her the opportunity to study in Italy with Renata Tebaldi and Carlo Bergonzi. Early on in her career, she won Baltimore Opera's Puccini Foundation Award, was a winner of the WGN-Illinois Opera Guild "Audition of the Air", was awarded two Career Grants from the Richard Tucker Music Foundation, and the Alumna of the Year Award from The Catholic University. More recently, Siena College bestowed upon her an Honorary Doctorate of Humane Letters, and she was awarded an Honorary Doctorate of Music from George Washington University.

== Watch and listen ==
- To hear Harolyn Blackwell sing the role of Norina from Donizetti's Don Pasquale click here: Watch Here on YouTube
- To hear Harolyn Blackwell sing the roles of Clara from Gershwin's Porgy and Bess, Oscar from Verdi's Un ballo in maschera, and Johanna from Stephen Sondheim's Sweeney Todd click here: Watch Here on YouTube
- To see Harolyn Blackwell in an interview with Charlie Rose concerning her replacement of Kathleen Battle click here: Watch Here on YouTube

== Discography ==
=== Solo recordings ===
- "Strange Hurt" — 1994 - RCA Victor 09026-61944-2 (Song cycles by Maury Yeston & Ricky Ian Gordon)
- Blackwell Sings Bernstein, a Simple Song — 1996
- All Through The Night — 2006

=== Classical recordings ===
- Brahms: Ein Deutsches Requiem — 2000 (London Symphony Orchestra)
- Gershwin: Porgy and Bess — 1998 (Cincinnati Pops Orchestra)
- Canadian Brass: Noël — 1994
- Gershwin: Porgy and Bess — 1989 (Glyndebourne Festival Opera)

=== Musical recordings ===
- Candide — 1997 - RCA Victor 09026-68835-2
- Sondheim - A Celebration at Carnegie Hall — 1993

=== DVD appearances ===
- Sondheim — A Celebration at Carnegie Hall — 1993
- Un ballo in maschera — 1991 (Metropolitan Opera)

== Selected television appearances ==
- A Capitol Fourth — 2008 (PBS)
- Pops Goes The Fourth — 1994 (A&E)
- Porgy and Bess — 1993 (BBC, as Clara)
- Sondheim — A Celebration at Carnegie Hall — 1993 (PBS' Great Performances)
- Un ballo in maschera — 1991 (Oscar in the Metropolitan Opera production, PBS's Great Performances)
- 1990 Grammy Awards
