= Imelda de' Lambertazzi =

Opera by Gaetano Donizetti

- Opera by Gaetano Donizetti
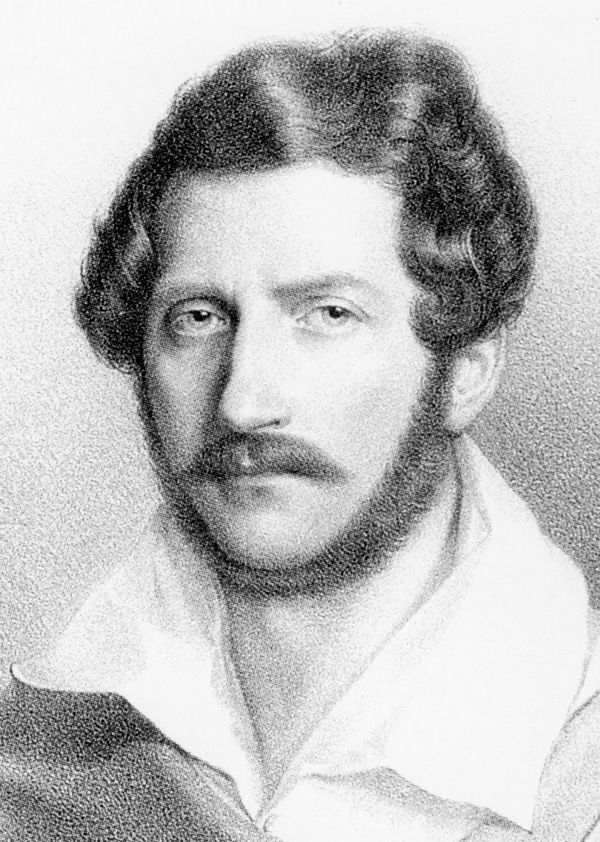
- Gaetano Donizetti c. 1835
- Librettist: Andrea Leone Tottola
- Language: Italian
- Based on: Gabriele Sperduti's Imelda
- Premiere: 5 September 1830; Teatro San Carlo, Naples

Imelda de' Lambertazzi is a melodramma tragico or tragic opera in two acts by Gaetano Donizetti from a libretto by Andrea Leone Tottola, based on the tragedy Imelda by Gabriele Sperduti. It received its first performance on 5 September 1830 at the Teatro San Carlo, Naples.

== Performance history ==
The opera was not a great success and performances of it are very rare. A concert performance was given on 10 March 2007 at the Queen Elizabeth Hall in London, conducted by Mark Elder, which was recorded by Opera Rara.

== Roles ==
Role	Voice type	Premiere Cast, 5 September 1830 (Conductor: - )
Imelda	soprano	Antonietta Galzerani
Bonifacio Geremei	baritone	Antonio Tamburini
Lamberto	tenor	Berardo Winter
Orlando Lambertazzi	tenor	Giovanni Basadonna
Ugo	bass	Michele Benedetti
Ubaldo	bass	Gennaro Ambrosini
Customers, followers of Lambertazzi, friends of Gieremei, soldiers, people

== Synopsis ==
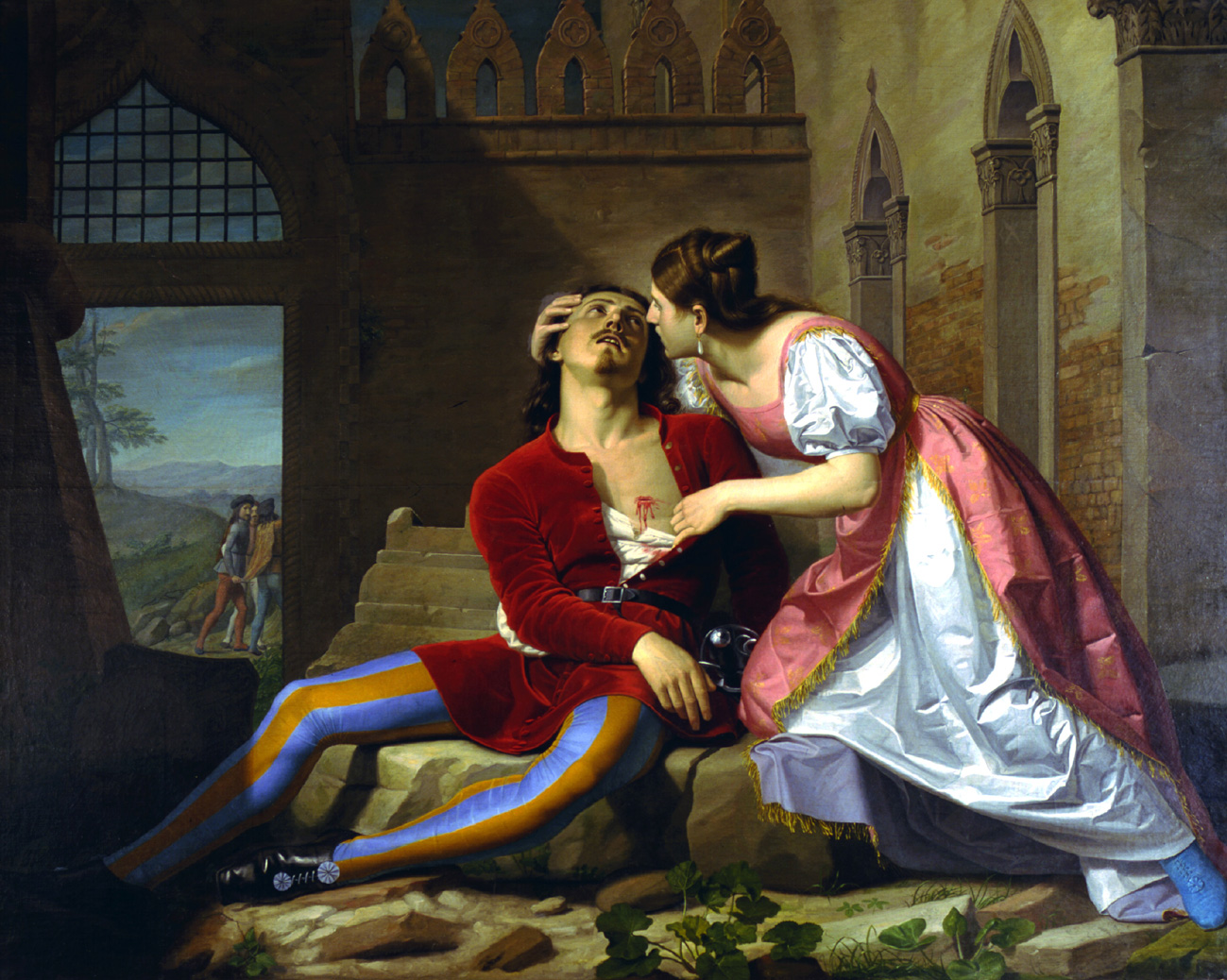
"Imelda e Bonifacio": death of Bonifacio in Imelda's arms, by Giovanni Pagliarini (1809-1878)

(This is a variation of the story of Romeo and Juliet.)

Time: 16th century
Place: Bologna

Imelda Lambertazzi (of the family supporting the Guelfs) loves Bonifacio, heir of the Geremei (of the family supporting the Ghibellines). When Bonifacio proposes peace between the families, to be sealed by their marriage, he is met with the ire of Imelda's father and brother. When Bonifacio attempts to see Imelda, he is stabbed with a poisoned dagger by her brother. Imelda pleads for forgiveness from her father before expiring herself, having sucked the poison from Bonifacio's wound.

== Recordings ==
Year	Cast: Imelda, Lamberto, Orlando Lambertazzi, Bonifacio	Conductor, Opera House and Orchestra	Label
1989	Floriana Sovilla, Diego D' Auria, Fausto Tenzi, Andrea Martin	Marc Andreae, Italian Switzerland Radio/TV Orchestra (Recorded at performances in Lugano, 15–19 February)	Audio CD: Nuova Era; Cat: 6778/6779
2007	Nicole Cabell, Massimo Giordano, Frank Lopardo, James Westman	Mark Elder, Orchestra of the Age of Enlightenment and Geoffrey Mitchell Choir	Audio CD: Opera Rara; Cat: ORC 36
