= Gianna Rolandi =

American soprano (1952–2021)

- Born: August 16, 1952; New York City, U.S.
- Died: June 20, 2021 (aged 68); Chicago, U.S.
- Education: Brevard Music Center; Curtis Institute of Music
- Occupations: Classical coloratura soprano; Opera center manager
- Organizations: New York City Opera; Lyric Opera Center for American Artists
- Spouse: Sir Andrew Davis (m. 1989)
- Children: 1

Gianna Rolandi (August 16, 1952 – June 20, 2021) was an American soprano. She was based at the New York City Opera (NYCO) and enjoyed a 20-year national and international career in coloratura soprano roles. She retired from performing in 1994 and served as director of and principal instructor at the Lyric Opera of Chicago's opera studio until 2013.

== Early life ==
Gianna Rolandi was born in New York City, and grew up in Spartanburg, South Carolina. Her mother, Jane Frazier, was an American soprano, and met her father, Italian obstetrician-gynecologist and celebrated composer of pre-war Italian popular music, Enrico Rolandi, while singing in Italy. Rolandi's father died in a car accident on Long Island when she was three, and the family moved back to the Carolinas, her mother's home. Rolandi's mother remarried in 1959 to John West Coker, chairman of the Music Department at Wofford College in Spartanburg, and a staff member of the Brevard Music Center. Rolandi's mother taught voice at Converse College in Spartanburg, while singing in many operatic productions in Spartanburg, the Brevard Music Center and the Charlotte Opera in North Carolina.

Rolandi started out as a violinist, at the age of 6, yet later remembered that "when there was nobody home, I'd turn on opera records and sing along with Tosca and Madama Butterfly." By the late 1960s she was studying violin at the Brevard Music Center, and she attended the North Carolina School of the Arts as a violin major in her senior year of high school. She took her first voice lessons at the Brevard Music Center, and continued a long association with the Center, where many of her coloratura roles were learned and first performed.

The soprano then trained for four years at the Curtis Institute of Music in Philadelphia. She was a finalist in the Metropolitan Opera auditions in 1974, winning the Minna Kaufmann Ruud Competition as one of the youngest winners in its history. She graduated from the Curtis Institute in 1975.

== Debut at New York City Opera ==
Rolandi landed a contract with the New York City Opera (NYCO) in 1975, before graduating from the Curtis Institute that same year. Her operatic debut, at NYCO, was as Olympia in Offenbach's Les contes d'Hoffmann, stepping in, followed by Zerbinetta in Ariadne auf Naxos by Richard Strauss as planned. She received critical acclaim in both roles. While in New York, Rolandi studied singing with Ellen Faull.

Appearing regularly with the NYCO, Rolandi was a leading coloratura soprano with the company for the next 15 years, singing more than 30 operatic roles, including Fortuna and Drusilla in Monteverdi's L'incoronazione di Poppea, Cleopatra in Handel's Giulio Cesare, Mozart's Susanna in Le nozze di Figaro and Queen of the Night in Die Zauberflöte, the title roles in Donizetti's La fille du régiment, Lucia di Lammermoor and Elvira in I puritani, Rosina in Rossini's The Barber of Seville, Gilda in Verdi's Rigoletto, the Queen of Shemakha in Rimsky-Korsakov's Le Coq d'or, the title role in Janáček's The Cunning Little Vixen, Adele as Die Fledermaus by Johann Strauss, Mabel in The Pirates of Penzance, and the title role in Naughty Marietta. In 1979, she took part in the world premiere of Miss Havisham's Fire by Dominick Argento.

In her early years at the NYCO, Rolandi was able to establish her career firmly without needing to go abroad. In 1982 she said, "I feel like I've grown up here.... The City Opera is a blessing for me, as it is for lots of young singers. You get exposure and you don't have to leave home."

Renowned soprano Beverly Sills, General Director of the New York City Opera, influenced Rolandi greatly. Sills said of Rolandi in 1981, "Gianna epitomizes all the things I want to see the City Opera stand for." Rolandi's repertory included many of the retired Sills' most famous roles. "Beverly's door is always open," Rolandi stated in 1982. "It's wonderful to have someone who's sung all these roles and to ask her how she solved certain problems."

== Metropolitan Opera and beyond ==
In 1979, Rolandi made her Metropolitan Opera debut as Sophie in Der Rosenkavalier by Richard Strauss. At the Met she also sang Olympia in 1983, the title role of Stravinsky's Le Rossignol in 1984 (broadcast internationally), and Zerbinetta in 1984/85 (broadcast internationally).

At the Lyric Opera of Chicago she made her debut as Dorinda in Handel's Orlando (1986), and returned to sing Despina in Così fan tutte (1993–94), a production that marked her retirement from the stage.

Rolandi also performed with many of the other major North American opera companies, including the San Francisco Opera, the Canadian Opera Company, the Washington National Opera, Florida Grand Opera, Santa Fe Opera, and the Spoleto Festival USA in Charleston, South Carolina.

She first appeared in Europe in 1981 at the Glyndebourne Festival as Zerbinetta, returning in 1984 for Susanna Zdenka in Arabella by Richard Strauss, and Mozart's Konstanze in Die Entführung aus dem Serail and Despina in Così fan tutte. Other major European engagements included Ginevra in Handel's Ariodante and Cleopatra in Geneva, Amenaide in Tancredi in Turin, and Elcia in Mosè in Egitto at the Rossini Opera Festival in Pesaro, Italy.

Rolandi recorded the role of Susanna conducted by Bernard Haitink. On television, she was the title role in two Live from Lincoln Center opera broadcasts: Lucia di Lammermoor (1982) and The Cunning Little Vixen (1983), and she was Clorinda in an English-language version of La Cenerentola (1980). She was Zdenka in the 1984 film version of Arabella in the Glyndebourne production.

== Directorship at Lyric Opera of Chicago ==
Following her retirement from vocal performance in 1994, Rolandi devoted herself to pedagogy and administration. She became Director of Vocal Studies for the Lyric Opera of Chicago's Ryan Opera Center and the Lyric Opera Center for American Artists (LOCAA) in May 2002, and was then named director of the Ryan Opera Center and the LOCAA in 2006, succeeding Richard Pearlman upon his death. Rolandi retired as director after the 2012/2013 season.

== Personal life ==
Rolandi became acquainted with conductor Andrew Davis when he conducted her performances of Zerbinetta in Ariadne auf Naxos, both at the Metropolitan Opera in 1984 and again at Glyndebourne in 1988. They married in 1989, and lived in England until 2000, when Davis was appointed the music director and principal conductor of the Lyric Opera of Chicago. They lived in Chicago, where Rolandi was director of the Lyric Opera of Chicago's Ryan Opera Center and the LOCAA until 2013. After her husband's knighthood in 1999, Rolandi was referred to as Lady Davis. Their son Ed Frazier Davis is a composer and conductor.

Rolandi died at age 68 on June 20, 2021.
