= Brevard Music Center =

Music venue and festival in Brevard, North Carolina

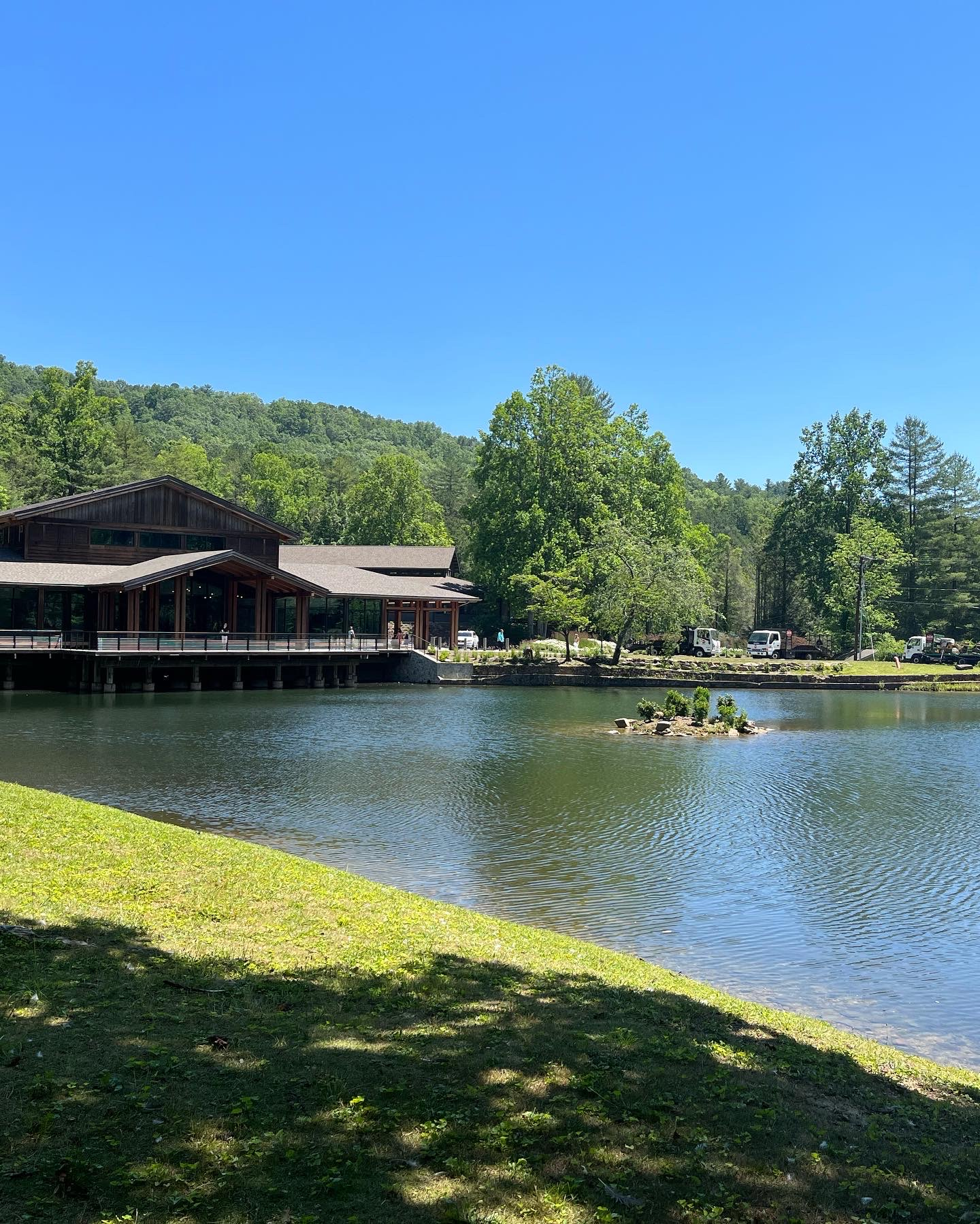
- Brevard Music Center's Parker Concert Hall in 2022
- Interactive map of Brevard Music Center
- Address: 349 Andante Lane, Brevard, North Carolina, United States
- Location: Brevard, North Carolina, United States
- Owner: Brevard Music Center
- Capacity: Whittington-Pfohl Auditorium: 1,800; Parker Concert Hall: 400

Construction
- Opened: 1945

Tenant
- Brevard Music Center Orchestra

Website
- www.brevardmusic.org

Brevard Music Center is a classical music venue and festival held annually located in Brevard, North Carolina. It has been the home to their international summer institute and festival that enrolls about four hundred students, age fourteen and older, who participate in orchestra and other large ensembles, an opera program, play chamber music, study composition, and take private lessons. A faculty of sixty is drawn from orchestras, conservatories, and universities. The season runs from the last week of June through the first week of August. Other than classical music, Brevard Music Center hosts contemporary music, bluegrass and popular artists, concerts, and frequent appearances by Keith Lockhart, Ken Lam, and a variety of soloists. With an annual budget of more than three million dollars, the Center contributes substantially to the economy of western North Carolina.

== History ==
The Brevard Music Center began life in 1936 as a summer music camp for boys at Davidson College. The founder, Davidson faculty member James Christian Pfohl, led the program for seven years at Davidson and one season at Queens College in Charlotte, North Carolina. In 1944 Pfohl moved the program to its present location in Brevard, North Carolina, and he instituted a festival of concerts in 1945. The name "Brevard Music Center" was adopted in 1955. Pfohl remained artistic director until 1964, when he was succeeded by Henry Janiec of Converse College, for whom the opera program is named. Janiec was succeeded in 1997 by conductor David Effron. Keith Lockhart became the artistic director in October 2007.

Brevard Music Center has 6 ensembles: Brevard Music Center Orchestra, Sinfonia, Concert Orchestra, Festival Orchestra, Symphonic Winds, and New Music Ensemble.

== Facilities and Venues ==
Brevard Music Center currently contains four performance venues on the campus. The largest one is the Whittington-Pfohl Auditorium, an outdoor hall with 1,800 seats, hosts more than eighty public concerts. Other than Whittington-Pfohl Auditorium, Brevard Music Center contains Thomas Hall and Straus Auditorium used to hold large ensemble rehearsals, studio classes, and chamber performances by students. Brevard Music Center also performs at Scott Concert Hall Porter Center at Brevard College for theater and opera productions. Parker Concert Hall, containing 400 seats, opened its first season in 2022 where Brevard Music Center Chambers concerts held by BMC faculty are performed. The Music Center, as it is known colloquially, also partners with the Transylvania County Library for a number of free public events.

== Brevard Music Center Summer Institute ==
Brevard Music Centers hosts an international summer festival enrolling about four hundred students fourteen years older and above with a faculty that consists of professional musicians that come from across the country. The Brevard Music Center offers instruction in orchestral instruments, piano, composition, voice, jazz, and opera. Brevard Music Center contains two divisions of college and high school where both divisions orchestral students perform in many of the festival's ensembles. Both divisions also perform and rehearse chamber ensembles for both string and winds. Two-thirds of the student body is college age or older, and all students and faculty live on the wooded campus of 180 acres (0.73 km^{2}).

== Alumni ==
Famous alumni include countertenor David Daniels, Boston Pops conductor Keith Lockhart, violist Roberto Diaz, president of the Curtis Institute of Music, and Gianna Rolandi, internationally known coloratura soprano, who became Director of the Ryan Opera Center at Lyric Opera of Chicago after retiring from the stage.

== See also ==
- Gianna Rolandi
