= David Effron =

American conductor and educator

David Effron is an American conductor and educator. After earning a Bachelor of Music degree in piano from the University of Michigan and a Master of Music degree in piano from Indiana University, he worked as an assistant to Wolfgang Sawallisch at the Cologne Opera. Upon returning to the United States he served as a member of the conducting staff at the New York City Opera for eighteen years. He served as head of the Merola Program in San Francisco and artistic director of the Central City Opera in Colorado.

Effron taught at the Curtis Institute of Music from 1970 until 1977 and was head of the orchestra program at the Eastman School of Music from 1977 until 1998. He also served as the music director and conductor of the Youngstown Symphony Orchestra from 1987 to 1996. Since 1998 he has been Professor of Music at Indiana University's Jacobs School of Music. From 1997-2007, Effron was artistic director of the summer Brevard Music Center.

Effron has conducted orchestras in Europe, Asia, Israel, and throughout North America. His recording of Aaron Copland's A Lincoln Portrait with narrator William Warfield and the Eastman Philharmonia won a Grammy Award for "Best Spoken Word Recording" of 1983. He is the recipient of a Fulbright scholarship as well as a Rockefeller Foundation Grant.
