= Rita Shane =

American soprano

Rita Shane (August 15, 1936 – October 9, 2014) was an American coloratura soprano.

== Biography ==
Born in the Bronx to Julius J. Shane and Rebekah (née Milner) Shane, Rita Shane studied at Barnard College and privately with voice teachers Beverly Peck Johnson and Herbert Bliss. In 1964, she made her operatic debut as Olympia in Les contes d'Hoffmann with Chattanooga Opera. She appeared the next year with the New York City Opera, as Donna Elvira in Don Giovanni.

Shane's performance in the 1971 live recording of Les Huguenots received praise as "borderline astonishing" by reviewer Charles Parsons. With the New York City Opera, Shane sang in such operas as Dialogues des Carmélites (as Mme Lidoine), The Love for Three Oranges (as Fata Morgana), Don Giovanni (now as Donna Anna) and Die Zauberflöte (Queen of the Night). She debuted at the Metropolitan Opera in 1973 as the Queen of the Night. Her repertoire at the Met, over eight seasons, included La bohème (as Musetta), Un ballo in maschera (as Oscar), Le siège de Corinthe, La traviata, Lucia di Lammermoor, Le prophète (as Berthe, in John Dexter's production), and Rigoletto.

Shane returned to the New York City Opera in 1979, creating the title character in Dominick Argento's Miss Havisham's Fire, and singing in La traviata. Later, she sang Dircé in Médée (in the Italian version) and Giselda in I Lombardi alla prima crociata with that company. For the New Orleans Opera Association, she appeared in La Juive and Les Huguenots. Shane performed in Milan (La Scala), Vienna and Munich. At Salzburg, in 1972, she was applauded for her performance in Schönberg's Erwartung, with Michael Gielen conducting. In 1973 she recorded excerpts from Handel's Athalia and Rinaldo for RCA Red Seal Records. From 1989 to 2014, Shane was on the faculty of the Eastman School of Music.

== Personal life ==
Rita Shane was married to Daniel Tritter from 1958 to 2005. The marriage ended in divorce. The couple had a son, Michael Shane Tritter, who survives his mother. Rita Shane died in 2014, of pancreatic and liver cancer, aged 78.

== Sources ==
- The Metropolitan Opera Encyclopedia, edited by David Hamilton, Simon and Schuster, 1987; ISBN 0-671-61732-X
