= Margaret Moffett Law =

American artist (1871–1956)

- Born: 1871; Spartanburg, SC
- Died: August 2, 1956 (aged 84–85); Fletcher, North Carolina
- Education: Converse College

Margaret Moffett Law (1871–1956) was an American artist and educator. Her work is part of the permanent collection of several American art museums, including the Smithsonian American Art Museum, the Baltimore Museum of Art, and the Montgomery Museum of Fine Arts.

== Early life and education ==
Law was born in 1871 to Reverend Thomas Hart Law, who had served as a Confederate chaplain and minister of the First Presbyterian Church of Spartanburg, South Carolina, and Anna Adger Law. In 1895, she became the first art major to graduate from Converse College. At various times she attended the Pennsylvania Academy of the Fine Arts and the Chase School, studied under Robert Henri at the Art Students League of New York, and studied with artists André Lhote and Charles Hawthorne.

== Career ==
With fellow artist Josephine Sibley Couper, Law founded the Arts and Crafts Club in Spartanburg in 1907. At the club's first exhibition, Couper and Law raised funds from local citizens to purchase Robert Henri's The Girl With Red Hair, which became the first piece of the permanent collection of the Spartanburg County Museum of Art, later the Spartanburg Art Museum. From 1918 to 1930, Law taught at Bryn Mawr School in Baltimore. She then returned to Spartanburg, where she worked as the art supervisor for the local school district. Law died on August 2, 1956, at the Mountain Sanitarium in Fletcher, North Carolina.

== Style ==
Law mostly painted scenes from rural life, particularly agricultural work and workers. According to art historian Zan Schuweiler Daab, her works "pulsate with intimate glimpses of life in South Carolina". Law's 1943 painting The Legend of the Peach, which portrays workers picking peaches in an orchard and incorporates a poem by South Carolina poet laureate Harry Russell Wilkins, was described by the Spartanburg County Historical Association as "the most important painting associated with Spartanburg County". Law's paintings and prints are included in the collections of the Smithsonian American Art Museum, the Montgomery Museum of Fine Arts, the Gibbes Museum of Art, the Nasher Museum of Art, and the Baltimore Museum of Art.
