= Miss Havisham's Fire =

Opera by Dominick Argento

Miss Havisham's Fire is an opera in 2 acts by composer Dominick Argento with an English language libretto by John Olon-Scrymgeour. The work is loosely based on Charles Dickens' 1861 novel Great Expectations, and centers on an investigation of the circumstances surrounding the death of Aurelia Havisham. Commissioned by the New York City Opera, the work premiered on March 22, 1979, at the New York State Theater at the Lincoln Center for the Performing Arts in Manhattan.

Miss Havisham's Fire was initially intended to be a farewell vehicle for soprano Beverly Sills, but she pulled out of the project due to illness and was replaced by Rita Shane. The opera received negative to mixed reviews in the press at its premiere and was not mounted again for more than 20 years. Argento revised it into a one-act monodrama entitled Miss Havisham's Wedding Night which Minnesota Opera premiered on May 1, 1981, at the Tyrone Guthrie Theater in Minneapolis, conducted by Philip Brunelle. It was performed under the baton of Gil Rose at Carnegie Hall on November 9, 2017, in a concert by New York City Opera celebrating the composer's 90th birthday.

In 2001 the Opera Theatre of Saint Louis revived the work in a new version by Argento that shortened the opera by more than an hour and made improvements to the work's dramatic structure. This production received a much more positive response from the press.

== Roles ==
Role	Voice type	Premiere cast, 22 March 1979 (Conductor: Julius Rudel)
Aurelia Havisham, an elderly recluse	soprano	Rita Shane
Estella Drummle, as a woman of 1859–60	mezzo-soprano	Susanne Marsee
Phillip Pirrip, as a man of 1859–60	baritone	Alan Titus
Grace-Helen Broome, as the former governess to Miss Havisham	mezzo-soprano	Elaine Bonazzi
Old Orlick, caretaker at Satis House	bass	Paul Ukena
Young Aurelia Havisham	soprano	Gianna Rolandi
Young Estella Drummle, adopted daughter of Miss Havisham	treble	Lorna Wallach
Young Phillip Pirrip (Pip), as a poor boy of 1846–8	boy soprano	Robert Sapolsky
Young Grace-Helen Broome, governess to Miss Havisham	soprano	Martha Sheil
Young Orlick	bass	James Brewer
Jaggers, Miss Havisham's solicitor	bass	Richard Cross
Bentley Drummle, man about town	tenor	John Lankston
The Examiner, officiating at the inquest	bass-baritone	Ralph Bassett
Sarah Pocket, relative of Miss Havisham	contralto	RoseMarie Freni
Camilla Pocket, relative of Miss Havisham	soprano	Martha Thigpen
Raymond Pocket, relative of Miss Havisham	tenor	Jonathan Green
Pumblechook, Uncle to Pip	spoken role	William Ledbetter
First maid	silent role	Gwenlynn Little
Second maid	silent role	Eunice Hill
Chorus: guests at the Assembly Ball and servants
