= Katherine Drayton Mayrant Simons =

South Carolina poet, novelist, and playwright

Katherine Drayton Mayrant Simons (January 21, 1890-1969) was a South Carolina poet, novelist, and playwright. After graduating from Converse College, she taught languages while continuing to write. She published her first book, Shadow Songs, in 1912. Simons served with the Red Cross during World War I. She was elected the first woman president of the Poetry Society of South Carolina. She continued to publish works throughout her lifetime and was inducted into the South Carolina Academy of Authors in 1997.

== Early life ==
Katherine Drayton Mayrant Simons was born on January 21, 1890, in Charleston, South Carolina, to Sedgewick Lewis Simons and Kate Drayton Mayrant. Her mother enjoyed poetry, while her father sang and played violin. Simons later recalled that "before [she] ever went to school [she] was writing verse about [her] cats and dogs, laboriously printing it out in a copybook". At a young age, Simons' family moved to Dorchester County, Summerville, where she was raised.

Simons attended Brownfield Academy in Summerville before transferring to Miss Sass School in Charleston. After graduating from high school, she enrolled at Converse College in Spartanburg, graduating a year early with a bachelor of arts in literature. While at Converse, Simons was named senior class poet, president of the Philosophian Literary Society, and won first place in the Converse Concept. After graduating Simons was awarded an honorary Doctor of Literature degree by Converse for her research on historical novels.

== Career ==
=== Early career ===
After graduating from Converse, Simons returned to Summerville, where she taught French and tutored German and Latin at Summerville High School. During this time, Simons continued writing, focusing mostly on poetry and novels, but also experimenting with essays, newspaper and magazine articles, short stories, historical sketches, plays, and book reviews. However, she did not prioritize her writing, instead she focused on her passion for horseback riding and social activities such as fox hunts, dances, and tennis.

Simons published her first book, Shadow Songs, in 1912 under the pseudonym "Kadra Maysi". The editor of The New York Times came up with this pseudonym by taking the first letters of Simons' names (Katherine Drayton Mayrant Simons). According to Simons, "The Times editor decided my name was too long to waste ink on, so he shortened it". However, this pen name caused issues with one reviewer claiming that Kadra Maysi was a Hindu man. As a result, Simons published her future writings under the name Katherine Simons.

=== Literary career ===
During World War I, Simons left teaching to serve with the Red Cross, caring for wounded French soldiers with her mother. Simons was decorated by the French government for her service. In 1925 she published her second book of poetry, The Patteran, which included poems that reflected her time in the war.

Simons joined the Poetry Society of South Carolina, later becoming their first woman president. She received multiple awards offered by the society, including the Forum Award and the William Gilmore Simms Award. In addition to her involvement in the Poetry Society of South Carolina, she was the associate director of the Summerville Journal and founding editor of the Summerville Forester.

Throughout the 1920s and 1930s, Simons continued to write. The works that she published during this time period include Roads of Romance and Historic Spots Near Summerville (1925) and Stories of Charleston Harbor (1930). In 1932, while traveling abroad with her cousin, Simons witnessed a fight between monarchists and republicans. Simons later recalled that she was struck by a piece of mortar falling on her head, but that her "reporter's instinct came to life" prompting her to write down the story, which she later sold to The State newspaper.

=== Later life ===
Simons' travels brought her to Ireland, where she spent a summer that inspired her poem "Songs of an Irish Summer", which won the Society Prize of the Poetry Society of South Carolina. She also started writing a novel based on her time spent in Ireland, but paused her work on it when she moved in with her uncle at 26 Gibbes Street, where she described herself as a "housekeeper". During this time, Simons started selling stories and novelettes, which she called "financial blessings" to pulp magazines. One of these was later transformed into a three-act play.

Simons continued to stay active in many organizations including the South Carolina Historical Society, The Huguenot Society of South Carolina, The South Carolina Society of National Colonial Dames of America, The South Carolina Division of the Daughters of the Confederacy, and the Poetry Society of South Carolina's Writers' Group. She began to publish under the name Drayton Mayrant, noting that "they wanted to pretend I was a man writing an adventure novel...It's still a man's world after all".

After World War II, Simons resumed work on her Ireland novel, publishing it in 1948 with the title A Sword in Galway. Simons continued to publish her writings in the following decade. In 1960 her health began to decline, preventing her from writing novels, but she continued to write poetry, which received many awards.

== Works ==
Novels

- The Running Thread (1949)
- First the Blade (1950)
- Courage is Not Given (1952)
- The Red Doe (1953)
- Always a River (1956)
- Lamp of Jerusalem (1957)
- Land Beyond the Tempest (1960)

Poetry

- Shadow Songs (1912)
- The Patteran (1925)
- White Horse Leaping (1951)

Plays

- Golden Slipper (1950) — with J. Whilden Blackwell, performed at Troy State Teachers' College
- Bewley's Bewitched (1952) — performed at Dock Street Theatre
- Held in Splendor (1953) — with Patricia Colbert Robinson, performed at Dock Street Theatre
- The Lost Atlantis (1964) — a ballet sketch, performed by Charleston Civic Ballet Company

== Legacy ==
Simons died on March 31, 1969, at the age of 79 and was buried at Magnolia Cemetery in Charleston, South Carolina. Her contributions to South Carolina's literary community were recognized after her death with her induction into the South Carolina Academy of Authors on March 15, 1997.
