= Radiana Pazmor =

American contralto, teacher, and music therapist

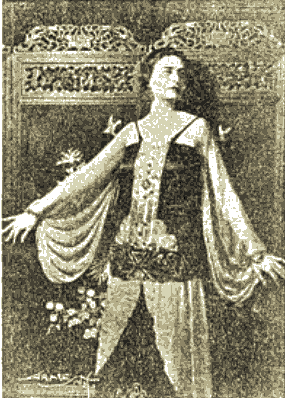
Pazmor in 1926

Radiana Pazmor (May 12, 1892 - January 25, 1986) was an American contralto, educator, and music therapist.

Born Harriet Horn Pasmore, Pazmor was a native of San Francisco; she later changed her name for dramatic effect. She received a bachelor's degree in French from the University of California, Berkeley in 1914. Beginning in that year she was an instructor at Pomona College, where she remained until 1920, teaching piano and, later, voice. From 1920 until 1925 she studied and performed in Europe; in the latter year she settled in New York, performing and teaching privately until 1935. From 1936 until 1940 she was in Los Angeles. Pazmor gained a reputation during the 1930s for performing contemporary art songs by American composers, among them Charles Ives, Henry Cowell, Carl Ruggles, John Cage, Ernst Bacon, Roger Sessions, Lou Harrison, Aaron Copland, and William Grant Still. Notably, she did much to popularize Ives's songs to California, and was the first artist to record "General William Booth Enters Into Heaven". She also premiered a number of songs by Ruth Crawford, with the composer at the piano, and introduced a handful of works by Marc Blitzstein.

Later in life, Pazmor turned her focus to music therapy, studying the discipline at Boston University and receiving her master's degree in 1955; concurrently she taught music at Converse College, where she remained from 1940 until 1960. In 1960 she began a career rehabilitating patients with vocal disorders, which she continued until 1969; that same year she retired from St. Andrews College, where she had been a visiting professor of music since 1963. After a 1970 automobile accident, in which she was injured, she moved to Sonoma, California, where she died. Pazmor was known for her dramatic sense, articulation, diction, and quality of tone during her career; her height and appearance, combined with her personality and poise, contributed greatly to her appeal as a concert artist. Papers related to Pazmor's career can be found in the Mickel Library at Converse University; the Irving S. Gilmore Music Library at Yale University; and the music divisions of the Library of Congress and the New York Public Library at Lincoln Center.
