= Sarah Atereth =

American singer

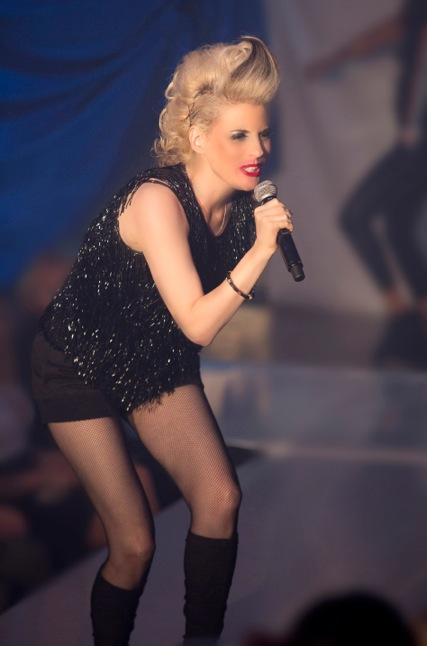
- Sarah Atereth performing at Night of a Thousand Gowns, NYC

Background information
- Born: Denver, Colorado, U.S.
- Genres: Pop, dance
- Occupations: Recording artist, singer, songwriter, dancer, choreographer, record producer
- Years active: 2000–present
- Label: Beguile Records
- Website: thesarah.com

Sarah Atereth is an American recording artist, singer, songwriter, dancer, choreographer, and record producer. Atereth has had five consecutive hit songs worldwide, including two No. 1 UK hits.

== Early life and education ==
Atereth was born and raised in Denver, Colorado, where she performed in the local theatre scene. She moved to New York City where she trained as a singer with Juilliard voice professor, Beverley Johnson and as a dancer with Fred Benjamin, the head of jazz at Alvin Ailey American Dance Theater. Atereth is a graduate of Columbia University.

== Career ==
Atereth's music career began when she was introduced to Chris Blackwell who in turn, paired her with Rick Chertoff, who co-produced Atereth's debut album, "Beguile".

Atereth's first single, "You Wouldn't Know How", reached No. 24 on Billboard Magazine's Dance Club Play Chart and crossed over to CHR/Mainstream Radio as reported by Radio & Records Magazine. Her song, "Out of My Mind", remixed by Tony Moran, hit No. 9 on Billboard Magazine's Dance Club Play Chart and received worldwide radio play.

Atereth's "The Remixes EP" debuted at No. 1 on the UK's DMC's Mainstream Chart unseating Stevie Nicks' "Dreams" remixed by Deep Dish (band). "The Remixes EP" also hit No. 2 on DMC's Club Chart. Music Week charted Atereth's "The Remixes EP" at No. 3 on their Commercial and Upfront Club Charts.

Her third single, "Fade Away", was the No. 1 most played song on XM Satellite Radio's bpm Station. The single was Atereth's first Top 40 Mainstream charting song. "Fade Away" hit No. 10 on Billboard Magazine's Dance Club Play Chart.

Atereth's fourth single "It Doesn't Take Much" hit No. 4 on Billboard Magazine's Dance Club Play Chart, No. 17 on Billboard's Magazine's Dance/Club Songs (Year End) and No. 19 on Billboard's Magazine's Dance/Mix Show Airplay hit No. 4 on Billboard Magazine's Dance Club Play Chart, No. 17 on Billboard's Magazine's Dance/Club Songs (Year End) and No. 19 on Billboard's Magazine's Dance/Mix Show Airplay. Remixers include world-famous DJ Tracy Young, who appears in the music video along with DJ Brett Hendrichsen of Masterbeat.

Atereth's fifth single "Without You", co-written with Bryan Adams reached No. 1 on Music Week’s Upfront Club Top 40 Chart. "Without You" has been remixed by DJs including Tiesto, Paul Oakenfold, Steve Aoki, Solasso, Nightstylers, Felix Leitner, and Riley & Durrant.

Atereth is one of the featured artists of until.org, along with Kevin Bacon, Jessica Alba and Michael Phelps.

Atereth was nominated for Best New Artist at the Winter Music Conference IDMA awards 2005 and Best Breakthrough Artist Solo at the Winter Music Conference IDMA awards 2007. Atereth was also named Music Week's FUTURE FACE of 2012.

As a writer, Atereth appeared in numerous publications and online magazines including z!nk and Artistpreneurs.

She is currently director of marketing for VoiceLove in New York.

== Discography ==
=== Albums ===
- Beguile (2004)

=== Singles ===
- You Wouldn’t Know How (2004)
- Out of My Mind (2005)
- It Doesn’t Take Much (2005)
- Fade Away (2006)
- Without You

=== Remixes and EPs ===
- Fade Away (Club and Radio Remixes) - EP
- Global Groove – Live 3
- It Doesn't Take Much (Club and Radio Remixes)
- Out of My Mind (Club and Radio Remixes) – EP
- Party Groove: Gay Days, Vol. 3
- UK EP (Pop and Club Remixes)
- Without You (The Remixes I and II)
- You Wouldn't Know How (Top 40 Edit, Remixes I and II)
