= Honey and Rue =

1992 song cycle by André Previn

- by André Previn
- Form: Song cycle
- Text: Toni Morrison
- Language: English
- Performed: 5 January 1992: Carnegie Hall, New York City
- Published: 1993: Chester Music, London
- Scoring: soprano and small orchestra

Honey and Rue is a song cycle composed by Oscar and Grammy award winner André Previn and premiered by Kathleen Battle, with words from poems by Nobel laureate Toni Morrison. It is scored for a solo soprano and small orchestra and is influenced by the rhythms of jazz, blues and American spirituals. The New York Times termed the composition "a model of understated luxury, rich and plastic without the need of ornament".

== History ==
According to The Critical Companion to Toni Morrison, Kathleen Battle had been moved by Morrison's novel The Bluest Eye, and asked Previn and Morrison to create a song cycle for her. The cycle was ultimately commissioned by Carnegie Hall. The lyrics, according to the Chicago Tribune, "move across a specifically black, urban, female landscape of experience".

It was premiered in 1992, sung by Battle in the Carnegie Hall, but most notably remembered as the Boston Symphony's Tanglewood Festival opener, conducted by Seiji Ozawa. This was the first time Morrison had written for an original score. The score was published in 1993 by Chester Music. Battle also performed the work that year at the Ravinia Festival with conductor John Nelson and the Chicago Symphony Orchestra.

Battle recorded the cycle with the Orchestra of St. Luke's and Previn conducting, on the Deutsche Grammophon label in 1995, together with Samuel Barber's Knoxville: Summer of 1915, and George Gershwin's, "I Loves You, Porgy" and "Summertime". In its review of the recording, the Baltimore Sun praised the work as "a wonderful cycle with a splendid text". That same year Battle sang the role with the New York Philharmonic, conductor Leonard Slatkin, and Toni Morrison as orator at Avery Fisher Hall. Battle has also performed the work with other major orchestras, including the Los Angeles Philharmonic and conductor Esa-Pekka Salonen in 1997, the Philadelphia Orchestra and conductor Gerard Schwarz at the Mann Center for the Performing Arts in 2000, and the Detroit Symphony and conductor Thomas Wilkins in 2006.

Soprano Harolyn Blackwell has also performed the work several times with Previn as conductor, including performances with the Orchestra of St. Luke's in New York (1996), the Pittsburgh Symphony Orchestra (1998), the NHK Symphony Orchestra in Tokyo (1999), and the Oslo Philharmonic (2001). Previn led the Oslo Philharmonic in performances of the work again in 2006, this time with soprano Nicole Cabell. More recently, soprano Jeanine De Bique performed the cycle to open the 102nd season of Matinee Musicale in the Anderson Center in Cincinnati in May 2015. Soprano Elizabeth Futral is scheduled to sing the work in August 2015 with the Pacific Symphony.

== Cycle ==
1. "First I'll Try Love"
2. "Whose House Is This"
3. "The Town Is Lit"
4. "Do You Know Him"
5. "I Am Not Seaworthy"
6. "Take My Mother Home"
