= Jeanine De Bique =

Trinidadian soprano singer

Jeanine De Bique (born 1981) is a Trinidadian classical soprano, trained at the Manhattan School of Music, known for her performance of Baroque music. In the 2017 BBC Proms she sang Handel's "Rejoice Greatly" with the Chineke! Orchestra, and in 2019 took the part of Iphis in a performance of Handel's Jephtha.
