= Kathleen Battle =

American operatic soprano (born 1948)

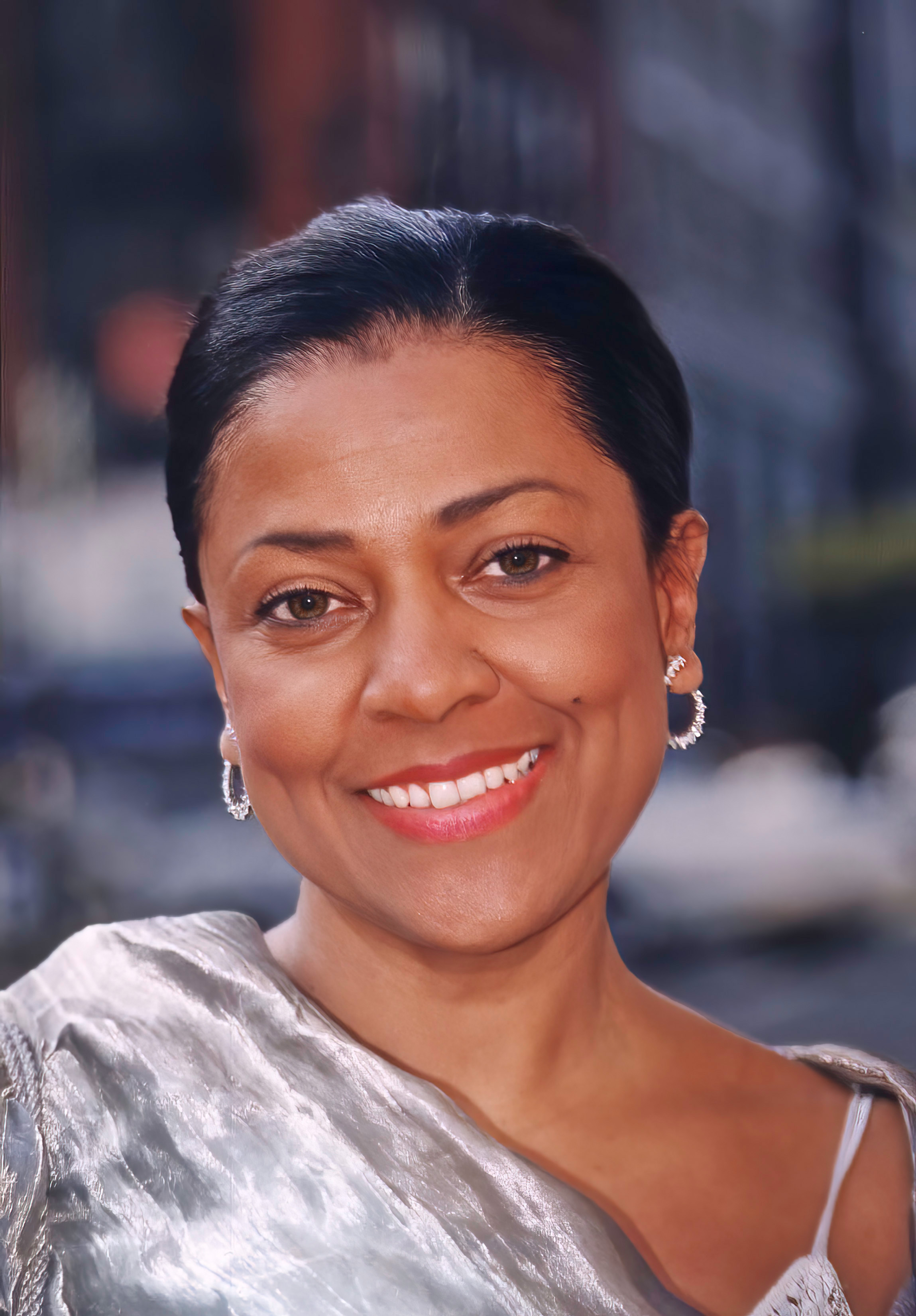
- Battle in 1999
- Born: August 13, 1948 (age 78); Portsmouth, Ohio, U.S.
- Education: University of Cincinnati (BM, MM)
- Occupation: Operatic soprano
- Years active: 1972–present
- Awards: Grammy Award; Laurence Olivier Award

Kathleen Deanna Battle (born August 13, 1948) is an American operatic soprano known for her distinctive vocal range and tone. Born in Portsmouth, Ohio, Battle initially became known for her work within the concert repertoire through performances with major orchestras during the early and mid-1970s. She made her opera debut in 1975. Battle expanded her repertoire into lyric soprano and coloratura soprano roles during the 1980s and early 1990s, until her eventual dismissal from the Metropolitan Opera in 1994. She later focused on recording and the concert stage. After a 22-year absence from the Met, Battle performed a concert of spirituals at the Metropolitan Opera House in November 2016, and again in May 2024.

Her vocal coach was the late Sylvia Olden Lee.

== Life and career ==
=== Early years and musical education ===
Battle was born in Portsmouth, Ohio, the youngest of seven children. Her father was a steelworker, and her mother was an active participant in the gospel music of the family's African Methodist Episcopal church. Battle attended Portsmouth High School, where her music teacher and mentor was Charles P. (Phil) Varney. In a 1985 Time Magazine interview, Varney recalled the first time he heard the eight-year-old Battle sing, describing her as "this tiny little thing singing so beautifully." "I went to her later", Varney recalled, "and told her God had blessed her, and she must always sing." In that same interview, music critic Michael Walsh described Battle as "the best lyric coloratura in the world."

Battle was awarded a scholarship to the University of Cincinnati – College-Conservatory of Music, where she studied voice with Franklin Bens and also worked with Italo Tajo. She majored in music education, and proceeded to a master's degree in Music Education. In 1971 she began a teaching career at an inner-city public school in Cincinnati, continuing to study voice privately while teaching 5th and 6th grade music. Later, she studied singing with Daniel Ferro in New York.

=== 1970s ===
In 1972, her second year as a teacher, a friend and fellow church choir member phoned her and informed her that the conductor Thomas Schippers was holding auditions in Cincinnati. At her audition Schippers engaged her to sing as the soprano soloist in Brahms' German Requiem at the 1972 Festival dei Due Mondi in Spoleto, Italy. Her performance there on July 9, 1972 marked the beginning of her professional career. During the next several years, Battle would go on to sing in several more orchestral concerts in New York, Los Angeles, and Cleveland. In 1973 she was awarded a grant from the Martha Baird Rockefeller Fund for Music to support her career. William Mullen, managing director of the Santa Fe Concert Association, was on the panel of judges who made the award. In 2004 he recalled:

We would meet monthly, listen to up-and-coming concert artists and give money to deserving artists for further study. A very young Kathleen Battle sang for us. The other judges thought her voice was too small, but I thought she had an incredible ability to communicate through music. I talked the other judges into giving her a grant.

Thomas Schippers introduced Kathleen Battle to his fellow conductor James Levine who selected Battle to sing in Mahler's Symphony No. 8 at the Cincinnati Symphony Orchestra's May Festival in 1974. This was the beginning of a friendship and close professional association between Battle and Levine that would last for 20 years and resulted in several recordings and performances in recital and concert performances, including engagements in Salzburg, Ravinia, and Carnegie Hall. Battle made her professional operatic debut in 1975 as Rosina in Rossini's The Barber of Seville with the Michigan Opera Theatre in Detroit. She made her New York City Opera debut the following year as Susanna in Mozart's The Marriage of Figaro, and in 1977 made both her San Francisco Opera debut as Oscar in Verdi's Un ballo in maschera and her Metropolitan Opera debut as the Shepherd in Wagner's Tannhäuser. The latter performance was conducted by James Levine. Battle made her Glyndebourne Festival debut (and UK debut) singing Nerina in Haydn's La fedeltà premiata in 1979.

=== 1980s ===
Throughout the 1980s, Battle performed in recitals, choral works and opera. Her work continued to take her to performance venues around the world. In 1980 she made her Zürich Opera debut as Adina in Donizetti's L'elisir d'amore. In 1982, she made her Salzburg Festival debut in Così fan tutte, followed three days later by an appearance in one of the Festival's Mozart Matinee concerts. In 1985, she was the soprano soloist in Mozart's Coronation Mass at St. Peter's Basilica in the Vatican, conducted by Herbert von Karajan. That same year she made her Royal Opera debut as Zerbinetta in Ariadne auf Naxos. In 1987 Karajan invited Battle to sing Johann Strauss' Voices of Spring for the Vienna New Year's Day concert. In opera she sang a variety of roles including Oscar at Lyric Opera of Chicago and a highly acclaimed Semele at Carnegie Hall. She returned to Salzburg various times to sing Susanna, Zerlina, and Despina, Mozart roles which she also sang at several other opera houses during that period. Battle became an established artist at the Metropolitan Opera in the 1980s, singing more than 150 performances with the company in 13 different operas, including the Met's first production of Handel's Giulio Cesare. Other opera houses where she performed include San Francisco Opera, English National Opera, Grand Théâtre de Genève, Vienna State Opera, and Deutsche Oper Berlin.

During this period, she received three Grammy Awards for her recordings: Kathleen Battle Sings Mozart (1986), Salzburg Recital (1987), and Ariadne auf Naxos (1987). Battle's 1986 collaboration with guitarist Christopher Parkening entitled Pleasures of Their Company was nominated for the Classical Album of the Year Grammy Award. She also received the Laurence Olivier Award (1985) for her stage performance as Zerbinetta in Ariadne auf Naxos at the Royal Opera House, London. Critical response to Battle's performances had rarely varied throughout the years following her debut. In 1985, Time Magazine pronounced her "the best lyric coloratura soprano in the world".

=== 1990s ===
The 1990s saw projects ranging from a concert program and a CD devoted to spirituals to a recording of baroque music, from performances of complete operas to recitals and recordings with jazz musicians.

In 1990, Battle and Jessye Norman performed a program of spirituals at Carnegie Hall with James Levine conducting. In the same year, she returned to Covent Garden to sing Norina in Don Pasquale and performed in a series of solo recitals in California, as well as appearing at the Hollywood Bowl with the Los Angeles Philharmonic. Battle's Carnegie Hall solo recital debut came on April 27, 1991 as part of the hall's Centennial Festival. Accompanied by pianist Margo Garrett, she sang arias and songs by Handel, Mozart, Liszt, Rachmaninoff, Gershwin and Richard Strauss, as well as several traditional spirituals. The contralto Marian Anderson, who had ended her farewell tour with a recital at Carnegie Hall in April 1965, was in the audience that night and Battle dedicated Rachmaninoff's "In the Silence of the Secret Night" to her. The recording of the recital earned Battle her fourth Grammy award. Another first came in January 1992 when Battle premiered André Previn's song cycle Honey and Rue with lyrics by Toni Morrison. The work was commissioned by Carnegie Hall and composed specifically for Battle.

In December 1993 she was joined by Martin Katz and Kenny Barron on piano and Grady Tate (drums), Grover Washington Jr. (saxophone) and David Williams (bass) at Carnegie Hall for a concert featuring the music of Handel, Haydn, and Duke Ellington as well as Christmas spirituals. During this time she also collaborated with other musicians including trumpeter Wynton Marsalis in a recording of baroque arias entitled, Baroque Duet; violinist Itzhak Perlman on an album of Bach arias; and flautist Jean-Pierre Rampal for a recital at Alice Tully Hall (also released on CD). In May 1993 Battle added pop music to her repertoire with the release of Janet Jackson's album Janet, lending her vocals to the song "This Time". An album of Japanese melodies, First Love, followed in November 1993.

On the opera stage, she performed in a variety of Mozart, Rossini and Donizetti operas. Between 1990 and 1993, she performed in several productions at the Metropolitan Opera: Rosina in The Barber of Seville (1990), Pamina in The Magic Flute (1991 and 1993), and Adina (with Luciano Pavarotti as Nemorino) in L'elisir d'amore (1991, 1992, and the Met's 1993 Japan Tour). She also won her fifth Grammy Award in 1993, singing the title role of Semele on the Deutsche Grammophon recording conducted by John Nelson.

Although Battle gave several critically praised performances at the Metropolitan Opera during the early 1990s, her relationship with the company's management showed increasing signs of strain during those years. As Battle's status grew, so did her reputation for being difficult and demanding. In October 1992 when she opened the Boston Symphony Orchestra season, she reportedly banned an assistant conductor and other musicians from her rehearsals, changed hotels several times, and left behind what a report in The Boston Globe called "a froth of ill will".

In February 1994, during rehearsals for an upcoming production of La fille du régiment at the Metropolitan Opera, Battle was said to have subjected her fellow performers to "withering criticism" and made "almost paranoid demands that they not look at her." General Manager Joseph Volpe responded by dismissing Battle from the production for "unprofessional actions" during rehearsals. Volpe called Battle's conduct "profoundly detrimental to the artistic collaboration among all the cast members" and indicated that he had "canceled all offers that have been made for the future." Any input that Metropolitan Opera music director James Levine (Battle’s close friend and collaborator for 20 years) may have had is shrouded in mystery. Battle was replaced in Donizetti's La fille du régiment by Harolyn Blackwell. At the time of her termination from the Met, Michael Walsh of Time magazine reported that "the cast of The Daughter of the Regiment applauded when it was told during rehearsal that Battle had been fired." After she sang with the San Francisco Opera at this time, several backstage workers wore T-shirts that read: "I survived the Battle."

In a statement released by her management company, Columbia Artists, Battle said: "I was not told by anyone at the Met about any unprofessional actions. To my knowledge, we were working out all of the artistic problems in the rehearsals, and I don't know the reason behind this unexpected dismissal. All I can say is I am saddened by this decision." Since then, Battle has not performed in opera.

For the remainder of the decade, she worked extensively in the recording studio and on the concert stage. She was a featured guest artist on the May 1994 album Tenderness, singing a duet, "My Favorite Things", with Grammy-winning jazz vocalist Al Jarreau. In 1995 she presented a program of opera arias and popular songs at Lincoln Center with baritone Thomas Hampson, conductor John Nelson, and the Orchestra of St. Luke's. She also released two albums in 1995: So Many Stars, a collection of folk songs, lullabies, and spirituals (with accompanying live concert performances) with Christian McBride and Grover Washington Jr. (with whom she had performed in Carnegie Hall the previous year); and Angels' Glory, a Christmas album with guitarist Christopher Parkening, a frequent collaborator.

In 1997 came the release of the albums Mozart Opera Arias and Grace, a collection of sacred songs. In October 1998, she joined jazz pianist Herbie Hancock on his album Gershwin's World in an arrangement of Gershwin's Prelude in C♯ minor. December 1999 saw the release of Fantasia 2000, on which she is the featured soprano in Elgar's Pomp and Circumstance Marches performed by the Chicago Symphony Orchestra and Chicago Symphony Chorus and conducted by long-time collaborator James Levine. In solo recitals she performed in cities including Los Angeles, New York, Cincinnati, and Chicago in programs that featured art songs from a variety of eras and regions, opera arias, and spirituals.

=== 2000–present ===
Battle has continued to pursue a number of diverse projects including the works of composers who are not associated with traditional classical music, performing the works of Vangelis, Stevie Wonder, and George Gershwin.

In August 2000, she performed an all-Schubert program at Ravinia. In June 2001, she and frequent collaborator soprano Jessye Norman performed Vangelis' Mythodea at the Temple of Olympian Zeus in Athens, Greece. In July 2003 she performed at the Ravinia Chicago Symphony Orchestra Gala with Bobby McFerrin and Denyce Graves. In 2006 she and James Ingram sang the song They Won't Go When I Go in a Tribute to Stevie Wonder and she began including Wonder's music in her recitals. In July 2007 she debuted at the Aspen Music Festival performing an all-Gershwin program as part of a season benefit. In October 2007, at a fundraiser for the Keep a Child Alive Charity, Kathleen Battle and Alicia Keys performed the song Miss Sarajevo written by U2's Bono.

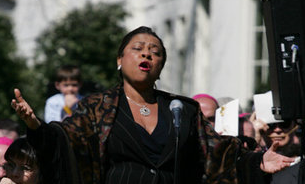
Battle singing the Lord's Prayer (2008) in honor of the Pope

On April 16, 2008, she sang an arrangement of the Lord's Prayer for Pope Benedict XVI on the occasion of his papal visit to the White House. This marks the second time she sang for a pope. (She first sang for Pope John Paul II in 1985 as soprano soloist in Mozart's Coronation Mass.) Later that year, she performed "Superwoman" on the American Music Awards with Alicia Keys and Queen Latifah. Since that time she has appeared in the occasional piano-voice recital, including a recital of works by Schubert, Liszt, and Rachmaninoff in Costa Mesa, California accompanied by Olga Kern (February 2010) and a recital in Carmel, Indiana, accompanied by Joel A. Martin (April 2013).

After a 22-year absence from the Metropolitan Opera House, Battle performed a concert of spirituals at the Met in November 2016. Battle later performed at the Metropolitan Opera again on May 12, 2024, where she received a standing ovation at the beginning of the concert upon entering the stage.

== Major debuts ==
- Professional debut: soprano soloist in Brahms' Ein Deutsches Requiem, Festival dei Due Mondi, Spoleto, Italy, July 9, 1972.
- Broadway debut: Treemonisha in Scott Joplin's Treemonisha (Gunther Schuller, conductor), (Wednesday and Saturday matinee performances), Uris Theatre, New York City, October 1975.
- Operatic debut: Rosina in The Barber of Seville, Michigan Opera Theatre, 1975.
- New York City Opera company debut: Susanna in The Marriage of Figaro, 1976.
- San Francisco Opera company debut: Oscar in Un ballo in maschera (Kurt Herbert Adler, conductor), November 12, 1977.
- Metropolitan Opera company debut: Shepherd in Tannhäuser (James Levine, conductor), December 22, 1977.
- UK debut and Glyndebourne Festival Opera debut: Nerina in La fedeltà premiata, July 15, 1979.
- Lyric Opera of Chicago company debut: Oscar in Un ballo in maschera (John Pritchard, conductor), November 26, 1980.
- Salzburg Festival debut and Salzburg opera debut: Despina in Così fan tutte (Riccardo Muti, conductor), July 28, 1982.
- Salzburg Festival solo recital debut: August 25, 1984.
- Royal Opera, London company debut: Zerbinetta in Ariadne auf Naxos, June 17, 1985.
- Carnegie Hall solo recital debut: April 27, 1991.

== Repertoire ==
Choral and symphonic

Major oratorio, choral, and symphonic works in which Battle has performed as a soloist:

- (Bach) Cantata No. 202 (Wedding Cantata)
- (Bach) Cantata No. 51 Jauchzet Gott in allen Landen, BWV 51
- (Alban Berg) Lulu Suite
- (Brahms) A German Requiem
- (Fauré) Requiem
- (Haydn) The Creation
- (Handel) Messiah
- (Mendelssohn) A Midsummer Night's Dream
- (Mahler) Symphony No. 2 Resurrection
- (Mahler) Symphony No. 4
- (Mahler) Symphony No. 8
- (Mozart) Exsultate, jubilate
- (Mozart) Great Mass in C Minor
- (Mozart) Mass in C Major Coronation
- (Mozart) Requiem
- (Orff) Carmina Burana
- (Poulenc) Gloria
- (Poulenc) Stabat Mater
- (André Previn) Honey and Rue
- (Vangelis) Mythodea

Opera

Battle has portrayed the following roles on stage:

- Blonde in Die Entführung aus dem Serail (Mozart)
- Konstanze in Die Entführung aus dem Serail (Mozart)
- Zerlina in Don Giovanni (Mozart)
- Pamina in Die Zauberflöte (Mozart)
- Despina in Così fan tutte (Mozart)
- Susanna in Le nozze di Figaro (Mozart)
- Adina in L'elisir d'amore (Donizetti)
- Marie in La fille du régiment (Donizetti)
- Norina in Don Pasquale (Donizetti)
- Zdenka in Arabella (Richard Strauss)
- Sophie in Der Rosenkavalier (Richard Strauss)
- Zerbinetta in Ariadne auf Naxos (Richard Strauss)
- Rosina in Il barbiere di Siviglia (Rossini)
- Elvira in L'italiana in Algeri (Rossini)
- Cleopatra in Giulio Cesare (Handel)
- Semele in Semele (Handel)
- Oscar in Un ballo in maschera (Verdi)
- Nanetta in Falstaff (Verdi)
- Sophie in Werther (Jules Massenet)
- Nerina in La fedeltà premiata (Haydn)
- The Angel in Saint François d'Assise (Olivier Messiaen)
- Treemonisha in Treemonisha (Scott Joplin)
- Shepherd in Tannhäuser (Wagner)

Concert and recital

Battle's concert and recital repertoire encompasses a wide array of music including classical, jazz, and crossover works. Her jazz and crossover repertoire includes the compositions of Duke Ellington, George Gershwin, Leonard Bernstein, André Previn, Rodgers and Hammerstein, and Stevie Wonder among others. She is known for her performances of African-American spirituals.

== Major collaborations ==
Among the conductors with whom Battle has worked are Herbert von Karajan, Riccardo Muti, Zubin Mehta, Seiji Ozawa, Claudio Abbado, Georg Solti, Carlo Maria Giulini, and Battle's fellow Ohioan James Levine, music director at New York's Metropolitan Opera. She has performed with many orchestras, including the New York Philharmonic, the Chicago Symphony Orchestra, the Boston Symphony Orchestra, the Philadelphia Orchestra, the Cleveland Orchestra, the Los Angeles Philharmonic, the Berlin Philharmonic, the Vienna Philharmonic, and the Orchestre de Paris. She has also appeared at the Salzburg Festival, Ravinia Festival, Tanglewood Festival, Blossom Festival, the Hollywood Bowl, Mann Music Centre Festival and the Caramoor Festival, and at Cincinnati May Festival.

In recital, she has been accompanied on the piano by various accompanists including Margo Garrett, Martin Katz, Warren Jones, James Levine, Joel Martin, Ken Noda, Sandra Rivers, Howard Watkins, Dennis Helmrich, JJ Penna, and Ted Taylor. Collaborations with other classical artists include flautist Jean-Pierre Rampal, soprano Jessye Norman, mezzo-sopranos Frederica von Stade and Florence Quivar, violinist Itzhak Perlman, baritone Thomas Hampson, tenors Luciano Pavarotti and Plácido Domingo, trumpeter Wynton Marsalis and guitarist Christopher Parkening.

Away from the classical side, she has worked with vocalists Al Jarreau, Bobby McFerrin, Alicia Keys, and James Ingram, jazz saxophonist Grover Washington Jr., jazz pianists Cyrus Chestnut and Herbie Hancock. Battle also lent voice to the song "This Time" on Janet Jackson's album Janet and sang the title song, "Lovers", for the 2004 Chinese action movie, House of Flying Daggers. She also performs the music of Stevie Wonder.

== Awards and honors ==
- Grammy, Best Classical Vocal Soloist Performance for Kathleen Battle Sings Mozart, 1986.
- Grammy, Best Classical Vocal Soloist Performance for Salzburg Recital, 1987.
- Grammy, Best Opera Recording for Richard Strauss: Ariadne Auf Naxos, 1987.
- Laurence Olivier Award, Best Performance in a New Opera Production for Zerbinetta in Ariadne auf Naxos, Royal Opera, London, 1985.
- Grammy, Best Classical Vocal Soloist Performance for Kathleen Battle at Carnegie Hall (Handel, Mozart, Liszt, Strauss, etc.), 1992.
- Emmy, Outstanding Individual Achievement – Classical Music/Dance Programming – Performance for the Metropolitan Opera Silver Anniversary Gala, 1992.
- Candace Award from the National Coalition of 100 Black Women, 1992.
- Grammy, Best Opera Recording for Handel: Semele, 1993.
- Golden Plate Award of the American Academy of Achievement, 1993.
- Battle is the recipient of six honorary doctorates from American universities. They include: the University of Cincinnati, Westminster Choir College, Ohio University, Xavier University, Amherst College, and Seton Hall University.
- NAACP Image Award – Hall of Fame Award, 1999.

== Sources ==
- Dyer, Richard; Forbes, Elizabeth. "Kathleen Battle". In L. Macy (ed.). Grove Music Online. (subscription required)
