= Martha Sheil =

American operatic soprano

Martha Sheil (born December 31, 1949) is an American operatic soprano who made her professional opera debut as the Contessa in Le nozze di Figaro at the New York City Opera under the baton of Julius Rudel. She went on to be a professor of voice at the University of Michigan School of Music, Theatre & Dance for over 30 years before her retirement in 2015.

== Early years ==
Sheil was born in Iowa, and participated in music in high school before leaving to attend the Curtis Institute of Music where she received both an undergraduate degree in voice and a graduate degree in opera. She coached and was taught by many greats, including Felix Popper, Licia Albanese, Otto Guth and most notably, wagnerian soprano Margaret Harshaw.

== Career ==
Sheil made her professional debut in 1975 as Alice Ford in Falstaff, and went on to make her debut at New York City Opera in 1976 as The Countess in The Marriage of Figaro. During this time, she also sang Mimi and Musetta in La Boheme, The Mozart heroines, and Suor Angelica. and many other roles.

After making her debut with the New York City Opera, Sheil performed 15 roles with the company over the course of six years, most notably in the world premiere of Dominick Argento Miss Havisham's Fire (1979). Sheil made her European debut at the Luzerner Theater in Switzerland where she sang for several seasons, as well as at the Heidelberger Schlossfestspiele.

She later went on to specialize in the roles of Verdi and Puccini, sing the leading soprano roles of Tosca, Madama Butterfly, Aida, and Turandot. Sheil has also performed in Atlanta, Detroit, Cleveland, Los Angeles, Seattle, Hawaii, and the Kennedy Center, She is the recipient of many awards as both a singer and teacher, including the American Wagner Association Prize, the Minna-Kaufmann Ruud Competition and the 2014 Harold Haugh Award.
