= Glendale, South Carolina =

Glendale
- CDP
- Location within the state of South Carolina
- Coordinates: 34°56′42″N 81°50′11″W
- Country: United States
- State: South Carolina
- County: Spartanburg

Area
  - Total: 0.21 sq mi (0.55 km^{2})
  - Land: 0.21 sq mi (0.55 km^{2})
  - Water: 0 sq mi (0.00 km^{2})
- Elevation: 715 ft (218 m)

Population (2020)
  - Total: 244
  - Density: 1,148.3/sq mi (443.38/km^{2})
- Time zone: UTC-5 (Eastern (EST))
  - Summer (DST): UTC-4 (EDT)
- ZIP codes: 29307, 29346
- FIPS code: 45083
- GNIS feature ID: 2629828

Glendale is a census-designated place located in Spartanburg County in the U.S. State of South Carolina. According to the 2010 United States census, the population was 307.

== History ==
A post office called Glendale has been in operation since 1878. The community's chief industry was a cotton mill.

The Bivings-Converse House was listed on the National Register of Historic Places in 1995.

== Geography ==
According to the United States Census Bureau, the CDP has a total area of 0.212 square miles (0.549 km^{2}), all land.

== Demographics ==
Historical population
Census	Pop.	Note	%±
2020	244		—
U.S. Decennial Census

== Education ==
Glendale is in the Spartanburg School District 3.
