= Converse University =

Private university in Spartanburg, South Carolina, US

- Former name: Converse College (1889–2021)
- Type: Private university
- Established: 1889; 137 years ago
- Endowment: $100 million (2025)
- President: Boone Hopkins
- Provost: William Case
- Faculty: 90 Full-time (2022)
- Students: 1,284
- Undergraduates: 804
- Postgraduates: 480
- Location: Spartanburg, South Carolina, U.S. 34°57′16.59″N 81°55′01.51″W
- Campus: Urban, 70 acres (28 ha)
- Colors: Purple and gold
- Nickname: Valkyries
- Sporting affiliations: NCAA Division II – Carolinas
- Mascot: Val the Valkyrie
- Website: converse.edu
- Converse College Historic District
- U.S. National Register of Historic Places
- U.S. Historic district
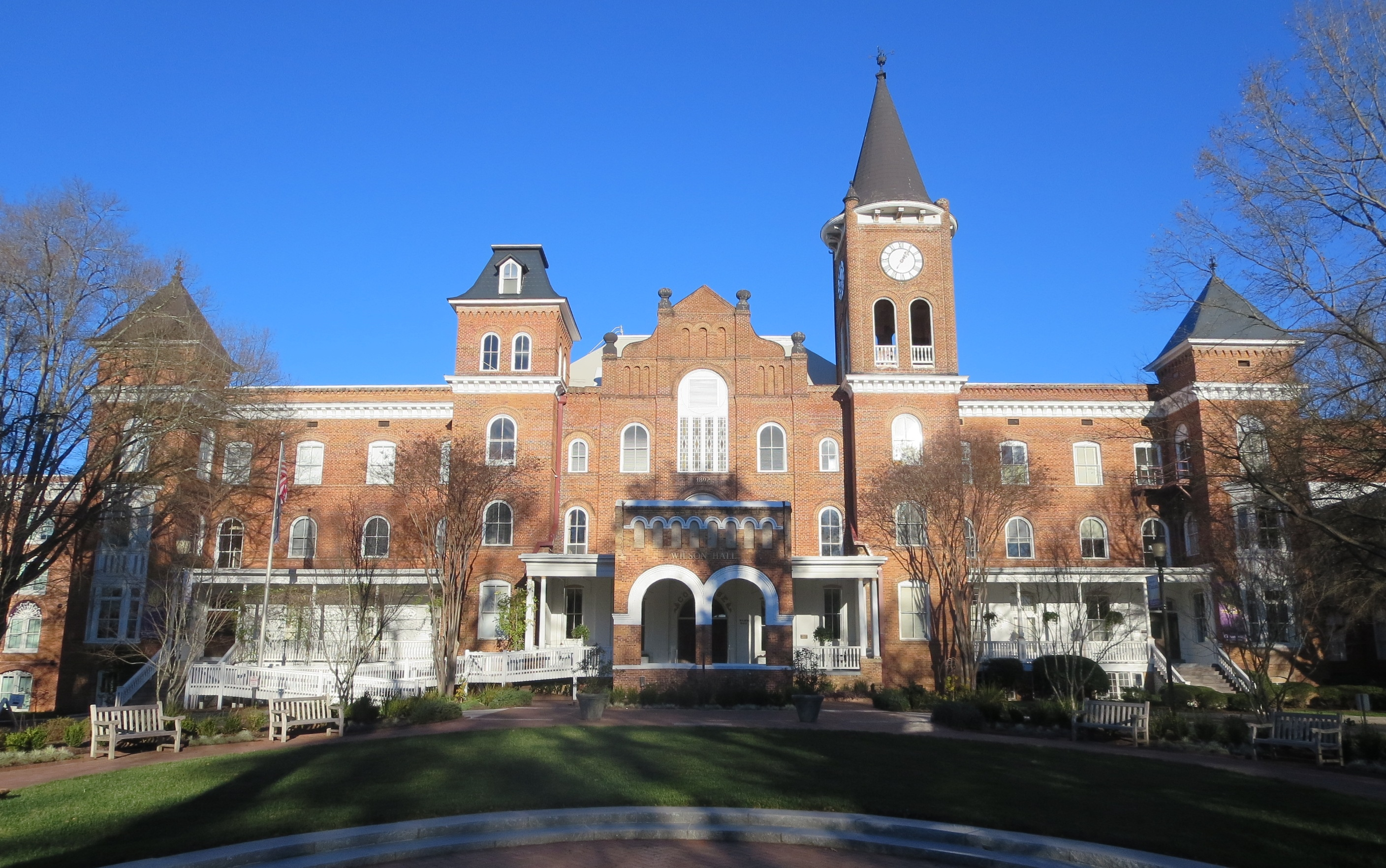

- Location within South Carolina Location within the United States
- Location: 580 E. Main St., Spartanburg, South Carolina
- Area: 20 acres (8.1 ha)
- Built: 1891-1915
- Architect: Hook, Charles
- Architectural style: Late Gothic Revival, Romanesque, Richardson Romanesque
- NRHP reference No.: 75001706
- Added to NRHP: November 12, 1975

Converse University is a private university in Spartanburg, South Carolina. It was established in 1889 by a group of Spartanburg residents and named after textile pioneer Dexter Edgar Converse. It was originally a women's college but now admits men.

== History ==
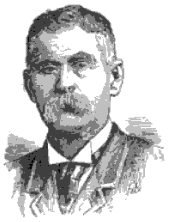
Dexter Edgar Converse

Converse College opened on October 1, 1890, with a student body of 168 women and 16 faculty members. The college only admitted women students and operated as a "stock company" with the board of directors composed entirely of residents of Spartanburg. Dexter Edgar Converse, a native of Vermont who had settled in Spartanburg before the American Civil War and had become a successful pioneer in the cotton mill industry, served as the head of the first board of directors. On January 2, 1892, fire destroyed the college's main building. The building was enlarged during its reconstruction. In 1896, the college was incorporated in South Carolina and a self-perpetuating board of trustees was named. In 1964, the college introduced graduate programs.

The Converse College Historic District was listed on the National Register of Historic Places in 1975. It encompasses eight contributing buildings dated between 1891 and 1915. They are the Main Building (Wilson Hall) (1892), Annex (Pell Hall, 1891), Twichell Auditorium (1898–1899), Carnegie Library (1905), Cleveland House (c. 1905), Judd Science Hall (1915), Dexter Hall (1899) and Towne House (1898). The buildings are representative of the Romanesque Revival, Gothic Revival, and Neo-Classical styles.

The college changed its name to "Converse University" in the summer of 2021. The college also "expanded its undergraduate residential program from single-gender to co-ed" by admitting male undergraduate students in the fall of 2021.

== Presidents ==
Name	Years served
Benjamin F. Wilson	1890–1902
Robert Paine Pell	1902–1932
Edward Moseley Gwathmey	1933–1955
Oliver Cromwell Carmichael, Jr.	1956–1960
Robert T. Coleman, Jr.	1961–1989
Ellen Wood Hall	1989–1993
Sandra C. Thomas	1994–1998
Nancy Oliver Gray	1999–2005
Elizabeth A. Fleming	2006–2016
Krista L. Newkirk	2016–2021
Jeffrey H. Barker	2021–2021
Boone J. Hopkins	2022–present

== Academics ==
Academic rankings

Master's
- Washington Monthly: 76 of 603

Regional
- U.S. News & World Report: 46 (tie) of 103

As of August 2023, Converse offers 44 undergraduate degree programs and 28 graduate programs. The university's undergraduate program also awards certificates. The University also has a presence at University Center of Greenville, a center that houses satellite campuses of several South Carolina colleges offering higher education programs. Converse offers two undergraduate and three graduate degree programs at the center.

The Nisbet Honors Program, established in 2000, is the university's undergraduate honors program.

Converse has a Model Programs team who participate in Model Arab League and the annual International Model NATO conference hosted by Howard University. Converse's Model Programs annually hosts the Southeastern Regional Model Arab League (SERMAL) conference.

== Athletics ==
The Converse athletic teams are called the Valkyries. The university is a member of the Division II ranks of the National Collegiate Athletic Association (NCAA), primarily competing in the Conference Carolinas (CC) since the 2007–08 academic year. The Valkyries previously competed as a Division II Independent from 2002–03 to 2006–07.

Women's sports include acrobatics and tumbling, basketball, cross country, equestrian, field hockey, lacrosse, soccer, softball, track and field (indoor and outdoor), golf, tennis, swimming and volleyball.

The inaugural men's sports are basketball, cross country, soccer, tennis, track and field (indoor and outdoor) and volleyball. Converse's equestrian program is coeducational, though only women participate in NCAA-recognized competition. The university also has a coeducational varsity esports team.

== Notable alumni ==
- Kimilee Bryant, Broadway actress and Miss South Carolina 1989
- Lynette Eason, Christian novelist and teacher
- Margaret Moffett Law, artist
- Ruth Perry, civil rights activist
- Fatemeh Pahlavi, royal member of the Pahlavi dynasty of Iran.
- Julia Peterkin, class of 1896 and winner of the Pulitzer Prize in 1929.
- Katherine Drayton Mayrant Simons, writer
- Sutton Stracke, class of 1993, socialite and television personality

== Notable faculty ==
- Steven Graff, concert pianist
- Julia Klumpke, concert violinist and composer
- Radiana Pazmor, contralto and music therapist
