= Utah Festival Opera =

Not-for-profit theatre company based in Logan, Utah

Utah Festival Opera & Musical Theatre (UFOMT) is an opera company based in Logan, Utah. The company performs six fully staged works with orchestra in repertory every July and August at the Ellen Eccles Theatre and the Utah Theatre. The works performed range from operas to operettas to musicals. Singers, performers, technicians and orchestra come from all over the United States, including artists from Broadway and the Metropolitan Opera.

== Founding ==
The company was founded in 1992 by operatic tenor Michael Ballam, a music professor at Utah State University, and a native of Logan. Besides being director of the company, he has also sung lead roles in many productions over the years.

Naughty Marietta by Victor Herbert was the first work performed by the company in 1993, along with Puccini's La Bohème and a double bill of Trial By Jury and The Impresario. Up through the 2000 season, there were three works in repertory. This increased to four in 2001, with productions of The Barber of Seville, South Pacific, Naughty Marietta and Susannah. In addition to the main stage productions, Utah Festival Opera & Musical Theatre offers many concerts and educational courses, including performances from The American Festival Chorus, conducted by Craig Jessop.

== The Dansante ==
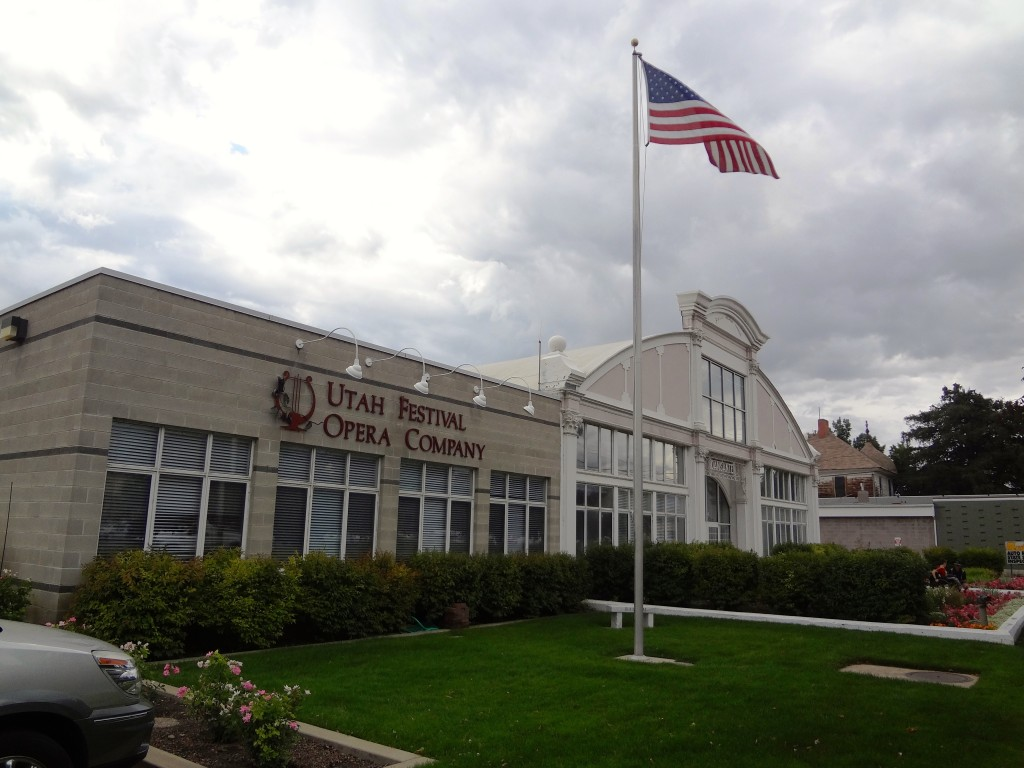
The Dansante

The offices, scene and costume shops of the company are in the Dansante building, a former dance hall. The Dansante also has a Recital Hall, as well as rehearsal rooms and practice rooms.

== The Utah Theatre ==
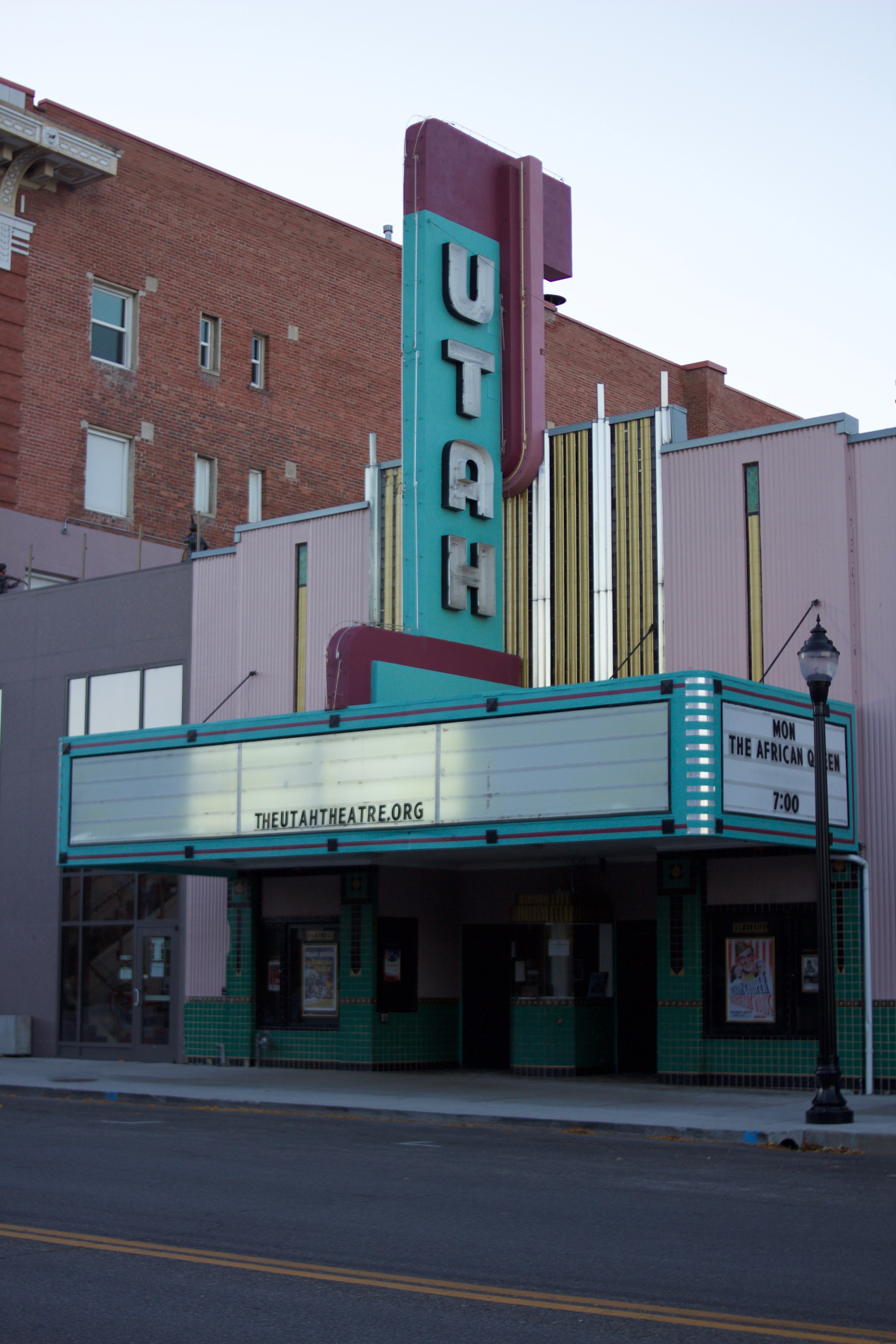
The Utah Theatre on Center Street in Logan, UT.

In 2007 UFOMT purchased the Utah Theatre, and took on a renovation of that facility, which was completed in June 2016. This addition to the company allowed for 2-3 smaller works to be performed, as well as showings of classic and silent films. The premiere performance at the Utah Theatre was Moose Charlap and Jule Styne's Peter Pan, starring Michael Ballam as Captain Hook and Adam T. Biner as Peter Pan.

== Opera by Children ==
Opera by Children is an educational outreach program run by Pamela Gee which has provided training for teachers and in-class mentoring for over 75,000 children to create their own operas in a classroom setting. Opera by Children is used by teachers throughout Utah and many western states unity, self-discovery and enthusiasm for learning in their classrooms. There is no cost to Utah teachers as their expenses are covered by state grants except for a small fee for materials and their attendance at an Opera by Children training workshop, after which they are then eligible for participation in the full year-long program.

== Conservatory ==
UFOMT also has a Youth Conservatory for children ranging from 8–18 years old to learn about all aspects of performing in musical theatre. Classes include acting, dance and singing which are taught by musical theatre professionals. During the Festival Season, the Conservatory hosts a week-long musical theatre intensive camp called Broadway Bound. In 2014, the program had to split the camp into Junior and Seniors due to growing membership. The Conservatory director is Stefan Espinosa.

== Academy ==
During each Festival Season, UFOMT offers adult education courses relating to the productions that are being performed. The program is run by Vanessa Ballam. Michael Ballam offers a week-long Opera and Musical Theatre seminar where he dissects each show, looking at its history, as well as other works by that particular composer. Highlights of the Academy include the Presto Change-O(ver) class where patrons come after a matinee performance and see the technical crew change the sets from one show to another in less than an hour; managing director Gary Griffin's cooking classes; the Late Night Cabarets where Festival artists perform under the stars in an outdoor, intimate setting; the Artist's Pallet class that brings in local artist, Kent Wallis to paint a landscape in two hours time.

The Academy also offers Literary Seminars each Wednesday-Friday morning of the season, where directors, performers and designers come in to talk about their experiences that lead them to UFOMT as well as their processes in creating their roles in the productions.

Past instructors include Michael Ballam, Vanessa Ballam, Stefan Espinosa, Phillip R. Lowe, Patti Johnson, Kevin Nakatani, Valerie Rachelle, Maggie L. Harrer, Kent Wallis, Larry Winborg, Paula Fowler, Yancey Quick, Craig Jessop, Jared Rounds, Roni Stein, Jack Shouse, Nathan Buonviri, Vanessa Schukis, Kathy Johnson, Kathleen Lane, and Sheldon Harnick.

== Utah High School Musical Theatre Awards ==
Beginning in 2011, UFOMT entered into the National High School Musical Theatre Awards program. This program is designed to recognize excellence in Musical Theatre in high schools throughout the country. During the school year, representatives from UFOMT travel across the state to adjudicate high school productions. Nominated schools and artists perform and winners are announced at an awards ceremony. The winners of Best Actress and Best Actor are sent to New York City to participate in the National High School Musical Theatre Awards, or the Jimmy's, founded by James L. Neederlander. The students make their Broadway debuts at the Minskoff Theatre, current home of The Lion King.

Awards include: Best Musical, Best Actor, Best Actress, Best Supporting Actor, Best Supporting Actress, Best Cameo, Best Director, Best Choreography, Best Ensemble, Best Orchestra, Best Scenic Design, Best Costume Design, Best Lighting Design, Best Technical Crew, and student awards in Choreography, Costume Design, Set Design and Lighting Design.

=== Past winners ===
*indicates Jimmy Awards finalist

	Best Musical	Best Actor	Best Actress	Best Supporting Actor	Best Supporting Actress
2011	West Side Story West Jordan High School	Aaron Wilcox - Tevye Fiddler on the Roof Legacy Prep High School	Taylor Nefcy - Babe The Pajama Game St. Joseph Catholic High School	Jace Mitchell - Riff West Side Story West Jordan High School	Lauren Sidwell - Martha White Christmas Logan High School
2012	Aida Hillcrest High School	Peter Lambert - Bobby Child Crazy For You Alta High School	Malia Morley - Aida Aida Hillcrest High School	Brock Damjanovich - Bella Zangler Crazy For You Alta High School	Katie Francis - Queen Aggravaine Once Upon a Mattress Logan High School
2013	Into the Woods Ogden High School	Stirling Brenna - The Baker Into the Woods Ogden High School	Sierra Dew - Eponine Les Misérables Lone Peak High School	Abram Rice - Javert Les Misérables Lone Peak High School	Arianna Stucki - The Witch Into the Woods Ogden High School
2014	Aida Woods Cross High School	Matthew Richards - Percy Blakeney* The Scarlet Pimpernel Northridge High School	Aitana Alapa - Aida Aida Woods Cross High School	Noah Dixon - Lord Farquaad Shrek, the Musical Lehi High School	Summer Sloan - Amneris Aida Woods Cross High School
2015	The Wedding Singer Northridge High School	Jordan Kirkham - Robbie Hart The Wedding Singer Northridge High School	Abby Watts - Mary Poppins Mary Poppins Woods Cross High School	Jaxson Dayton - Sky Masterson Guys & Dolls Lone Peak High School	Ashley Coombs - Penelope Pennywise Urinetown Lehi High School
2016	The Little Mermaid Uintah High School	Angel Martinez - Gomez Addams The Addams Family Clearfield High School	Hannah Romney - Brenda Strong Catch Me If You Can Salt Lake School for the Performing Arts	Ben Engel - Officer Lockstock Urinetown Skyline High School	Jessica Lewis - Velma Kelly Chicago The DaVinci Academy

== Production history ==
*indicates UFOMT debut

Utah Festival Opera & Musical Theatre Production History
Year	Work	Composer & Lyricist	Lang.	Year	Conductor	Director	Choreographer	Designers	Notable Singers/Performers
1993	Naughty Marietta	Herbert	English	1910	Barbara Silverstein	Vince Liotta	Kathy Ward	Keith Brumley Kathleen Grossman Ben Wilson	Michael Ballam Marla Berg Nathan Gunn Amy Kendell
1993	La Bohème	Puccini	Italian	1896	Henry Holt	Matthew Lata		Allan Trumpler Kathleen Grossman Ben Wilson	Stephen Wall Sharon Davis Donn Everette Verenia Lind Vanessa Ballam*
1993	Trial by Jury	Gilbert & Sullivan	English	1875	Charles Prince	William Farlow		Jeffrey Beercroft Ben Wilson	John Hansen Nathan Gunn Gene Scheer James Miller
1993	The Impresario	Mozart	German	1786	Charles Prince	William Farlow		Kathleen Grossman Ben Wilson	Gene Scheer Patricia Swasey Susan Deauvono John Shuffle
1994	Die Fledermaus	Strauss	German	1874	Henry Holt	Vince Liotta		Peter Dean Beck Patricia Johnson Nicholas Cavallaro	Susan Deauvono Michael Ballam Mary Shearer James Miller John Brandsetter
1994	Fanny	Rome	English	1954	Ward Holmquist	Francis J. Cullinan	Kathy Ward	Keith Brumley Karen Ledger Nicholas Cavallaro	Peggy Joyce Brian Steele Michael Phillip Davis Brannon Hall-Garcia
1994	Madama Butterfly	Puccini	Italian	1904	Barbara Silverstein	Matthew Lata		Wally Coburg Steven Horak Nicholas Cavallaro	Richard Nickol Sharon Davis Cassandra McConnell Nicola DiToro
1995	The Magic Flute	Mozart	English	1791	Barbara Silverstein	Vincent Liotta		R. Keith Brumley Baker Smith Nicholas Cavallaro	Curt Peterson Tod Fitzpatrick Anna Vikre Diane Thueson
1995	La Traviata	Verdi	Italian	1853	Henry Holt	Matthew Lata		Carey Wong Patti Johnson Nicholas Cavallaro	Jennifer Casey Cabot Michael Philip Davis Bryan Davis Grant Youngblood
1995	She Loves Me	Bock & Harnick	English	1963	Ward Holmquist	Francis J. Cullinan	Kathy Ward	William Forrester Baker Smith Nicholas Cavallaro	Suzan Hanson Michael Ballam Joy Hermalyn Brannon-Hall Garcia
1996	Don Pasquale	Donizetti	English	1843	Barbara Silverstein	David Gately		Tony Fanning Helen Rodgers Nicholas Cavallaro	Thomas Hammons Marlin Miller Anna Vikre Grant Youngblood
1996	The Girl of the Golden West	Puccini	Italian	1910	Ward Holmquist	Vincent Liotta		R. Keith Brumley Baker Smith Nicholas Cavallaro	Karon Poston-Sullivan Brian Montgomery Arnold Rawls Alberto Sanchez
1996	1776	Edwards	English	1969	Mark Ferrell	Francis J. Cullinan	Kathy Ward	William Forrester Baker Smith Nicholas Cavallaro	Michael Ballam Joy Hermalyn Shawn Roy Daryl Henriksen Jonathan Hays
1997	The Merry Widow	Lehár	English	1905	Henry Holt	Dorothy Danner	Dorothy Danner	John Conklin Zack Brown Nicholas Cavallaro	Suzan Deauvono Michael Ballam Sharon Davis Marlin Miller
1997	Greenwillow	Loesser	English	1960	Karen Keltner*	Vincent Liotta	Kathy Ward	Bill Forrester Barbara Bush Nicholas Cavallaro	Chad McAlester Carol Chickering Brannon Hall-Garcia Michael Ballam
1997	Tosca	Puccini	Italian	1899	Fiona Contino	Thor Steingraber		Ercole Sormani Emily Dunn Nicholas Cavallaro	Katherine Luna Richard Sanchez Brian Montgomery Gregory Keil
1997	The Coyote Tales	Mallicone & Harnick	English	1997	Henry Mallicone	Sheldon Harnick			Gregory Keil David Mayfield Lorie Jarrett
1998	I Pagliacci	Leoncavallo	Italian	1892	Michael Singher	Robert Darling		Nicholas Cavallaro	Richard Sanchez Rebecca Ravenshaw Carlos Serrano Melvin Lowery
1998	Gianni Schicchi	Puccini	English	1918	Michael Singher	Robert Darling		Nicholas Cavallaro	Michael Ballam Jamie Baer Richard Crawley
1998	I Do! I Do!	Schmidt & Jones	English	1966	Karen Keltner	Dorothy Danner	Dorothy Danner	Dennis Hassan Baker Smith Nicholas Cavallaro	Michael Ballam Suzan Hanson
1998	The Pirates of Penzance	Gilbert & Sullivan	English	1879	Gerald Steichen	David Gately	David Gately	William Pitkin John Lehmeyer Nicholas Cavallaro	Alberto Sanchez Jamie Baer Bart Williams
1999	Carousel	Rodgers & Hammerstein	English	1945	Karen Keltner	Dorothy Danner	Dorothy Danner	Karen Iverson Baker Smith Nicholas Cavallaro	Michael Ballam Suzan Hanson Joy Hermalyn Nancy Shade
1999	The Student Prince	Romberg	English	1924	Robert Henderson	Jack Shouse	Carolyn Shouse	Michael Anania Patti Johnson Jean-Louise England Nicholas Cavallaro	Kevin Hill Pamela Hinchman John Atkins Tausha Bunker Torrez
1999	The Tales of Hoffmann	Offenbach	French	1881	Gerald Steichen	Jacobo Kaufmann	Kathy Ward	Dennis Hassan Hill Reihs-Gromes Pablo Guzzman	Gerard Powers Allison Charney Franco Pomponi Leah Creek
2000	Carmen	Bizet	French	1875	Robert Henderson	Jack Shouse*	Carolyn Shouse*	Miguel Romero Susan Memmott Allred Maja E. White	Elizabeth Batton Richard Sanchez Suzan Hanson Daniel Narducci
2000	The Mikado	Gilbert & Sullivan	English	1885	Karen Keltner	David Gately		Nina Nikolic-McMillan Carey Hanson Maja E. White	Curtis Olds Johanna Wiseman Kevin Hill David Gately Melissa Parks
2000	Julius Caesar	Handel	Italian	1724	Gerald Steichen	Brad Carroll		Jack Shouse Judith A. Ryerson Maja E. White	Jerry Hinks Erie Mills Les Young Charlene Marcinko
2001	The Barber of Seville	Rossini	Italian	1813	Gerald Steichen	Carol Dian Werner		Dennis Hassan Susan Memmot Allred Maja E. White	Shon Sims Carla Lopez-Speziale David Gustafson Ryan Allen
2001	South Pacific	Rodgers & Hammerstein	English	1949	Karen Keltner	Dorothy Danner	Dorothy Danner	Patrick Larson Amanda Profaizer Maja E. White	Leslie Ann Hendricks Bojan Knezevic Mark Womack* Jeanette Blakeney Vanessa J. Schukis* Tamara Elaine Mumford
2001	Susannah	Floyd	English	1955	Karen Keltner	Jack Shouse	Carolyn Shouse	Jack Shouse Judith A. Ryerson Maja E. White	Faith Esham William Parcher Paul Arthur Mow Branch Fields Charles Edwin Taylor
2001	Naughty Marietta	Herbert	English	1910	Gerarld Steichen	Shawn Churchman	Wendy Worley	Dennis Hassan Judith A. Ryerson Maja E. White	Danielle Strauss Matthew Walley Eric Strong Danielle Hermon David Crawford
2002	The Magic Flute	Mozart	English	1791	Gerald Steichen	Carol Werner-Feiertag		Carol Werner-Feiertag Teresa Linneman Maja E. White	Keith Jameson Adina Aaron Shon Sims Anna Vikre Ashley Howard Wilkinson John Easterlin
2002	The Desert Song	Romberg & Hammerstein	English	1926	Karen Keltner	Dorothy Danner		Brent Taylor Sjodin Maja E. White Michael Anania	Mark Womack Margaret Lloyd John Easterlin Danielle S. Hermon George Dyer
2002	The Sound of Music	Rodgers & Hammerstein	English	1959	Karen Keltner	Russell Henderson	Wendy Worley	Christopher McCollum Patti Johnson Maja E. White	Leslie Ann Hendricks Tomas Ambt Kofod Lisa van der Ploeg Bart Williams
2002	Die Fledermaus	Strauss	German	1874	Barbara Day Turner*	Jack Shouse	Carolyn Shouse	Peter Dean Beck Brent Tyler Sjodin Maja E. White	Bruce Reed Evelyn de la Rosa Pamela Hinchman Troy Gordon Tamara Elaine Mumford
2003	Fiddler on the Roof	Bock & Harnick	English	1964	Karen Keltner	Dorothy Danner	Dorothy Danner	Dennis Hassan Andrea Varga John Martin	William Theisen Rachel Joselon Megan McCorkie Vanessa Ballam Christopher Holloway Eric VanTielen
2003	Madama Butterfly	Puccini	Italian	1903	Barbara Day Turner	Stephanie Sundine		Jack Shouse Ane Marie Ambt Kofod John Martin	Allison Charney Richard Sanchez Michael Corvino* Jennifer Herzig
2003	The Wizard of Oz	Arlen & Harburg	English	1987	Barbara Day Turner	Jack Shouse	Carolyn Shouse	Jack Shouse Carey Hanson John Martin	Leslie Ann Hendricks Tomas Ambt Kofod Edwin Uhey Charles Edwin Taylor Bart Williams
2003	Nabucco	Verdi	Italian	1841	Karen Keltner	Jacobo Kaufmann		Jacobo Kaufmann John Martin	Michael Corvino Kenneth Shaw Marie-Adele McArthur Lisa van der Ploeg Nicholas Coppolo
2004	Rigoletto	Verdi	Italian	1851	Karen Keltner	James Marvel		Robert Dahlstrom Patti Johnson Steve Woods	Gabriel González Michael Corvino Jennifer Welch-Babidge
2004	The Secret Garden	Norman & Simon	English	1991	Barbara Day Turner	Jack Shouse	Carolyn Shouse	Jack Shouse Judy Ryerson Steve Woods	Michael Ballam Beth Alison Suzan Hanson Kevin Massey
2004	La Cenerentola	Rossini	Italian	1816	Gerald Steichen	Brad Carroll		Jack Shouse Judy Ryerson Emilio Aguilar	Maria Zifchak Curt Peterson Shon Sims Daniel Cole Darrell Babidge Tamara Elaine Mumford
2004	Brigadoon	Lerner & Loewe	English	1947	Karen Keltner	Tony Parise	Tony Parise	Tony Parise Patti Johnson Steve Woods	Tod Fitzpatrick Johanna Wiseman Kevin Massey Shon Sims
2005	Turandot	Puccini	Italian	1926	Barbara Day Turner	James Marvel		Jack Shouse Andrea Huelse Bill E. Kickbush	Othalie Graham Simon Kyung Lee Jennifer Welch-Babidge Daniel Cole
2005	Annie Get Your Gun	Berlin	English	1946	Barbara Day Turner	David Gately	John de los Santos	Robert Little Janet Teller Bill E. Kickbush	Joy Hermalyn Mark Walters Joseph Specter Vanessa Schukis Nathan Pacheco Douglas Carpenter
2005	Kismet	Wright & Forrest	English	1953	Karen Keltner	Dorothy Danner	Sandra Roveta	Jack Shouse Earl Battle Bill E. Kickbush	Kyle Pfortmiller* Lori Brown Mirabal Terry Hodges Larry Cannon
2005	The Crucible	Ward	English	1961	Karen Keltner	Jack Shouse	Carolyn Shouse	David Harwell Patti Worley Johnson Tláloc López-Watermann	Kristopher Irtimer* Carla Rae Cook Joy Hermalyn John Pickle Arturo Chacón-Cruz Renée Tatum
2005	The Creation Oratorio	Haydn	German	1798	Karen Keltner				Evelyn de la Rosa Daniel Cole Randall Ball
2006	The Marriage of Figaro	Mozart	Italian	1786	Barbara Day Turner	James Marvel		Peter Dean Beck Earl Battle Tláloc López-Watermann	Kristopher Irtimer Suzanne Woods David Barron Sarah Austin Darrell Babidge Kara Shay Thompson
2006	The Music Man	Willson	English	1957	Barbara Day Turner	John de los Santos	John de los Santos	Bill Forrester Tommy Macon Eileen Smitheimer	Josh Powell Lisanne Norman W. Lee Daily* Vanessa Schukis
2006	La Bohème	Puccini	Italian	1896	Karen Keltner	Daniel Helfgot*		Jack Shouse Patti Worley Johnson Tláloc López-Watermann	Arturo Chacón-Cruz Wendy Bryn Harmer Karin Paludan Mark Walters Scott MacLeod
2006	Man of La Mancha	Leigh & Darion	English	1965	Karen Keltner	Jack Shouse	Carolyn Shouse	Jack Shouse Shiloh Cheney Tláloc López-Watermann	Michael Ballam Audrey Babcock Isai Jess Munoz Josh Powell Kevin Nakatani*
2007	Il Travatore	Verdi	Italian	1853	Karen Keltner	James Marvel		Jim Lyden Shiloh Cheney Tláloc López-Watermann	Arthur Shen Othalie Graham Michael Corvino Carla Rae Cook
2007	The Most Happy Fella	Loesser	English	1956	Karen Keltner	Jack Shouse	Carolyn Shouse	Jack Shouse Patti Worley Johnson Tláloc López-Watermann	Michael Ballam Beverly Thiele Mark Walters Melissa Mitchell Douglas Carpenter Anthony Eversole
2007	Show Boat	Kern & Hammerstein	English	1927	Barbara Day Turner	Valerie Rachelle*	Valerie Rachelle Jonathan Hoover	Robert Little Tommy Macon Driscoll Otto	Lisanne Norman Christopher Holmes Alaine Rodin Bart Williams Vanessa Schukis Amie Einerson Matt Lutz
2007	Porgy and Bess	Gershwin	English	1935	Barbara Day Turner	Daniel Helfgot	Carolyn Shouse	Jim Lyden Earl Battle Tláloc López-Watermann	Richard Hobson Rachelle Perry Ward Ashley Howard Wilkinson Alaine Rodin Lori Brown Mirabal Judith Skinner Kearstin Piper Brown
2007	West Side Story in Concert	Bernstein & Sondheim	English	1957	Nathan Fifield	Tayneshia L. Jefferson		Anne Grosz James Lawdor III	Chris Shenkle Melissa Simpson Jeanette Blakeney Douglas Carpenter
2008	1776	Edwards	English	1969	Karen Keltner	Jack Shouse	Carolyn Shouse	Bill Forrester Patti Worley Johnson Tláloc López-Watermann	Michael Ballam Kyle Pfortmiller Mark Womack David Ward Christopher Holloway Josh Powell Darrell Babidge
2008	Aida	Verdi	Italian	1871	Karen Keltner	Beth Greenberg	Kathy Ward	Peter Crompton Earl Battle Tláloc López-Watermann	Marie-Adele McArthur Lisa van der Ploeg Arthur Shen Michael Corvino Rachel Willis-Sorensen
2008	Into the Woods	Sondheim	English	1987	Nathan Fifield	Valerie Rachelle	Valerie Rachelle	Patrick Larson Tommy Macon Chad Bonaker	Joy Hermalyn W. Lee Daily Danielle Hermon Wood Jonathan Hoover Josh Powell Cassandra Orr Coulam
2008	Manon Lescaut	Puccini	Italian	1892	Barbara Day Turner	Daniel Helfgot	Kathy Ward	Jack Shouse Jean-Louise England Chad Bonaker	Irina Rindzuner Marcos Aguilar Bojan Knezevic Michael Corvino
2008	Gypsy in Concert	Styne & Sondheim	English	1959	Barbara Day Turner	Jack Shouse		Patti Worley Johnson Peter George	Joy Hermalyn Stephanos Tsirakoglou Amie Einerson Meredith Taylor
2009	Camelot	Lerner & Loewe	English	1961	Barbara Day Turner	Leo Cortez	Carolyn Shouse	John Iacovelli Mary Froehlich Chad Bonaker	Josh Powell Vanessa Ballam Mark Womack James Arrington Stefan Espinosa*
2009	Carmen	Bizet	French	1875	Barbara Day Turner	Daniel Helfgot	Stephanie R. White	Robert Little Susan Memmott Allred Chad Bonaker	Audrey Babcock Jason Baldwin Sarah Hibbard Mark Womack Stina Marie Eberhardt Kevin Nakatani
2009	Cavalleria Rusticana	Mascagni	Italian	1889	Karen Keltner	Jack Shouse	Carolyn Shouse	Shawn Fisher Judy Ryerson Chad Bonaker	Bruce Reed Brenda Frye Michael Corvino Vanessa Schukis Sarah-Nicole Ruddy* Kathryn Long
2009	I Pagliacci	Leoncavallo	Italian	1892	Karen Keltner	Jack Shouse	Carolyn Shouse	Jack Shouse Judy Ryerson Chad Bonaker	Bruce Reed Sarah Hibbard Christopher Holloway Michael Corvino
2009	The Mikado	Gilbert & Sullivan	English	1885	Karen Keltner	Adrianne Moore	Stephanie R. White	Nina Nikolic-McMillan Carey Hanson Mike Inwood	Michael Ballam Vanessa Ballam Kevin Nakatani Jordan Bluth Stefan Espinosa Vanessa Schukis
2010	The Sound of Music	Rodgers & Hammerstein	English	1959	Barbara Day Turner	Jack Shouse	Carolyn Shouse	Christopher McCollum Patti Worley Johnson Chad Bonaker	Vanessa Ballam Mark Womack Michelle Trovato W. Lee Daily
2010	La Traviata	Verdi	Italian	1853	Karen Keltner	Daniel Helfgot	Michelle Burns	Jim Lyden Tommy Macon Chad Bonaker	Jennifer Welch-Babidge Eric Margiore Charles Taylor Michelle Trovato
2010	The Barber of Seville	Rossini	Italian	1813	Barbara Day Turner	Daniel Helfgot		Dennis Hassan Jim Lyden Margaret Downs Chad Bonaker	Kyle Pfortmiller Millnee Bannister Jordan Bluth Stephanos Tsirakoglou Stina Marie Eberhardt
2010	Guys & Dolls	Loesser	English	1950	Karen Keltner	Valerie Rachelle	Michelle Burns	Robert Little Crystal Herman Chad Bonaker	Vanessa Ballam Kyle Pfortmiller Mark Womack Carianne Wrona Michael Ballam W. Lee Daily
2010	George M! in Concert	Cohan	English	1968	Barbara Day Turner	Jack Shouse		Jack Shouse Patti Worley Johnson Corrine O'Sullivan	Michael Ballam Stephanos Tsirakoglou Vanessa Schukis Kathryn Long
2010	Marni Nixon Tribute Concert	Various	English		Karen Keltner Barbara Day Turner				Marni Nixon
2010	The Verdi Requiem	Verdi	Italian	1874	Craig Jessop				Jennifer Welch-Babidge Carla Rae Cook Eric Margiore Kristopher Irtimer
2011	Oliver!	Bart	English	1960	Karen Keltner	Jack Shouse	Carolyn Shouse	Dennis Hassan Jean-Louise England Patti Worley Johnson Chad Bonaker	Michael Ballam Jace Salcido Jessica Medoff Cameron Conrad Bill Russell Sarah-Nicole Ruddy
2011	Don Giovanni	Mozart	Italian	1787	Barbara Day Turner	Daniel Helfgot	Aaron Lopez	Jim Lyden Howard Tsvi Kaplan Chad Bonaker	Mark Womack Rochelle Bard Eleni Calenos Jordan Bluth Stephanos Tsirakoglou Molly Mustonen Gabriel Preisser
2011	South Pacific	Rodgers & Hammerstein	English	1949	Barbara Day Turner	Maggie L. Harrer*	Maggie L. Harrer	Patrick Larson Phillip R. Lowe* Chad Bonaker	Branch Fields Molly Mustonen Mark Womack Jeanette Blakeney
2011	Boris Godunov	Mussorgsky	Russian	1869	Karen Keltner	Julia Pevzner		Jack Shouse Patti Worley Johnson Chad Bonaker	Craig Hart Jordan Bluth Kristopher Irtimer A.J. Glueckert Gabriel Manro Tanner Knight Kevin Nakatani Kirk Dougherty
2011	The Merry Widow in Concert	Lehár	English	1905	Karen Keltner	Daniel Helfgot	Aaron Lopez	Margaret Downs Meghan Crimmins	Eleni Calenos Gabriel Preissner Tanner Knight Sarah-Nicole Ruddy Jennie Lister
2012	My Fair Lady	Lerner & Loewe	English	1956	Karen Keltner	Valerie Rachelle	Keenon Hooks	Robert Little Tommy Macon Chad Bonaker	Vanessa Ballam Kyle Pfortmiller Michael Ballam Ben Houghton W. Lee Daily Vanessa Schukis Sarah-Nicole Ruddy
2012	Tosca	Puccini	Italian	1899	Karen Keltner	Jack Shouse	Carolyn Shouse	Jim Lyden Patti Worley Johnson Chad Bonaker	Carla Thelen Hanson Jonathan Burton Jeffrey Snider Kevin Nakatani
2012	Kiss Me, Kate	Porter	English	1948	Barbara Day Turner	Maggie L. Harrer	Maggie L. Harrer	Robert Little Phillip R. Lowe Chad Bonaker	Vanessa Ballam Kyle Pfortmiller Siobhan Doherty Ben Houghton W. Lee Daily Emily Tate Alex Larson
2012	Faust	Gounod	French	1859	Barbara Day Turner	Daniel Helfgot	Daniel Helfgot Keenon Hooks	Shawn Fisher Wes Jenkins Chad Bonaker	Marc Schreiner Jessica Medoff Kristopher Irtimer Kyle Pfortmiller Jamie Hartzell John Buffett
2012	Girl Crazy in Concert	Gershwin	English	1930	Karen Keltner	Valerie Rachelle	Keenon Hooks	Robert Little Sarah Gray Todd Backus Chad Bonaker	Siobhan Doherty Ben Houghton Vanessa Schukis Gabriel Manro
2012	St. Matthew Passion	Bach	German	1727	Craig Jessop				Christopher Cock William Ramsey Kiera Duffy Ryan Belongie Marc Schreiner Kristopher Irtimer John Buffett
2013	Fiddler on the Roof	Bock & Harnick	English	1964	Karen Keltner	Maggie L. Harrer	Maggie L. Harrer	Dennis Hassan Patti Worley Johnson Christopher Wood	Michael Ballam Valerie Rachelle Vanessa Ballam Stefan Espinosa Olivia Ballam Blair Scott Reardon Camden Gonzales Tony Carter Richard Zuch Vanessa Schukis
2013	Otello	Verdi	Italian	1887	Barbara Day Turner	Daniel Helfgot	Keenon Hooks	Peter Crompton Wes Jenkins Christopher Wood	Curtis Bannister Carla Thelen Hanson Jason Stearns Michael Jones Amanda Tarver
2013	Joseph and the Amazing Technicolor Dreamcoat	Webber	English	1981	Barbara Day Turner	Valerie Rachelle	Valerie Rachelle Keenon Hooks	Patrick Larson Phillip R. Lowe Christopher Wood	Jonathan Hoover Vanessa Ballam Scott Reardon Mary Page Nance
2013	The Flying Dutchman	Wagner	German	1843	Karen Keltner	Jack Shouse	Carolyn Shouse	Jack Shouse Misti Bradford Christopher Wood	Kristopher Irtimer Elizabeth Beers Kataria Richard Zuch John Pickle Benjamin Bongers
2013	Rex Staged Reading	Rodgers & Harnick	English	1976	Karen Keltner	Sheldon Harnick Maggie L. Harrer	Maggie L. Harrer		Michael Ballam Stefan Espinosa Carla Thelen Hanson Kevin Nakatani Olivia Ballam Blair
2013	Missa Solemnis	Beethoven	German	1823	Craig Jessop				Carla Thelen Hanson Sarah-Nicole Ruddy John Pickle Richard Zuch
2014	Les Misérables	Boublil & Schönberg	English	1985	Karen Keltner	Valerie Rachelle	Valerie Rachelle	Patrick Larson Misti Bradford Christopher Wood	Patrick Miller Daniel Cilli Vanessa Ballam Patrick Massey Stefan Espinosa Vanessa Schukis Curtis Bannister Tyler Olshanksy Leah Edwards
2014	The Student Prince	Romberg	English	1924	Barbara Day Turner	Jack Shouse	Carolyn Shouse	Robert Little Amanda Profaizer Christopher Wood	Andrew Bidlack Emma-Grace Dunbar Richard Zuch Vanessa Ballam Kevin Nakatani Vanessa Schukis Rachel Sparrow
2014	Oklahoma!	Rodgers & Hammerstein	English	1943	Karen Keltner	Maggie L. Harrer	Maggie L. Harrer Lauren Camp	Timothy Case Phillip R. Lowe Christopher Wood	Wes Mason Leah Edwards Kevin Nakatani Bray Wilkins Caitlin Beitel Stefan Espinosa Vanessa Schukis
2014	Vanessa	Barber	English	1958	Barbara Day Turner	Daniel Helfgot	Kevin Nakatani	Jack Shouse Wes Jenkins Christopher Wood	Beverly O'Regan Thiele Andrew Bidlack Alice-Anne M. Light Amanda Tarver
2015	Man of La Mancha	Leigh & Darion	English	1965	Karen Keltner	Jack Shouse	Carolyn Shouse	Jack Shouse Misti Bradford Chris Wood	Michael Ballam Jessica Medoff W. Lee Daily Kevin Nakatani Tyler Olshansky
2015	Carousel	Rodgers & Hammerstein	English	1945	Karen Keltner	Maggie L. Harrer	Maggie L. Harrer Lauren Camp	Karen Iverson Steven G. Schmidt Chris Wood	Wes Mason Molly Mustonen Leah Edwards Jessica Medoff Fiona Katrine
2015	La Bohème	Puccini	Italian	1896	Barbara Day Turner	Daniel Helfgot		Jack Shouse Amanda Profaizer Chris Wood	Peter Scott Drackley Catherine Spitzer Gregory Gerbrandt Jamilyn Manning-White
2015	How to Succeed in Business Without Really Trying	Loesser	English	1961	James Michael Bankhead	Valerie Rachelle	Valerie Rachelle Lauren Camp	Fred M. Duer Phillip R. Lowe Chris Wood	Adam T. Biner Leah Edwards W. Lee Daily Kevin Nakatani Jillian Prefach Vanessa Schukis
2015	Rose in Flames Staged Reading	Shinn & Medoff	English	2015	Barbara Day Turner	Mark Medoff			Jessica Medoff Mackenzie Gotcher Quentin Oliver Lee Brian Hupp Adrian Rosales Jessie Tisdale
2015	Carmina Burana	Orff	Latin	1937	Craig Jessop				Peter Scott Drackley Jamilyn Manning-White Gregory Gerbandt
2016	Peter Pan	Charlap & Styne	English	1954	Dallas Heaton	Vanessa Ballam	Kathy Ward Kevin Nakatani	Shawn Fisher Phillip R. Lowe Jesse Portillo	Adam T. Biner Michael Ballam Klara Ricks Stefan Espinosa Kevin Nakatani Sarah-Nicole Ruddy Levi Hopkins Porter Harris
2016	Porgy and Bess	Gershwin	English	1935	Barbara Day Turner	Daniel Helfgot		Jim Lyden Steven G. Schmidt Chris Wood	Kenneth Overton Kearstin Piper Brown Brandon Coleman Jasmine Habersham Curtis Bannister Jenina Galloway
2016	Ragtime	Ahrens & Flaherty	English	1998	James Michael Bankhead	Valerie Rachelle	Valerie Rachelle Kevin Nakatani	Michael Raiford Lydia Semler Chris Wood	Ezekiel Andrew Vanessa Ballam Stefan Espinosa Kearstin Piper Brown Adam T. Biner
2016	Show Boat	Kern & Hammerstein	English	1927	Karen Keltner	Valerie Rachelle	Valerie Rachelle Stephanie R. White	Robert Little Phillip R. Lowe Chris Wood	Vanessa Ballam Harold Meers Nora Graham-Smith Scott Ford Vanessa Schukis Adam T. Biner Kim Stephenson
2016	Il Tabarro	Puccini	Italian	1918	Karen Keltner	Daniel Helfgot		Timothy Case Jennifer Sheshko Wood Chris Wood	Harold Meers Sandra DeAthos Kenneth Overton
2016	Suor Angelica	Puccini	Italian	1917	Karen Keltner	Daniel Helfgot		Timothy Case Jennifer Sheshko Wood Chris Wood	Sandra DeAthos Gwendolyn Brown
2016	Gianni Schicchi	Puccini	English	1918	Karen Keltner	Daniel Helfgot		Timothy Case Jennifer Sheshko Wood Chris Wood	Michael Ballam Harold Meers Claire Lopatka Stefan Espinosa
2016	Mass in B Minor	Bach	Latin	1749	Craig Jessop				Jasmine Habersham Sarai Cole Sarah-Nicole Ruddy Timothy Stoddard Earl Wellington Hazell
2017	Seussical, the Musical	Ahrens & Flaherty	English	2000		Vanessa Ballam			Stefan Espinosa W. Lee Daily Jessica Gruver Olivia Yokers
2017	Madama Butterfly	Puccini	Italian	1903	Nicolas Giusti	Valerie Rachelle			Kristin K. Vogel Nelson Ebo Holly Sorensen Errik M. Hood
2017	Rex	Rodgers & Harnick	English	1976	Dallas K. Heaton	Maggie L. Harrer			Michael Ballam Stefan Espinosa Kristin K. Vogel Holly Sorensen
2017	The Music Man	Willson	English	1957	Karen Keltner	Valerie Rachelle			Vanessa Ballam Curt Olds W. Lee Daily Julie Hollist
2017	The Hunchback of Notre Dame	Menken & Schwartz	English	2015	Karen Keltner	Brad Carroll			Ezekiel Andrew Jessica Gruver Kevin Nakatani Edward Brennan
2017	The Pirates of Penzance	Gilbert & Sullivan	English	1879	James Michael Bankhead	Brad Carroll			Curt Olds Ezekiel Andrew Olivai Yokers Edward Brennan Cabrica Jacobsen
