= Ballam (surname) =

Ballam is a surname. Notable people with the surname include:

- Charles Ballam (1901–1981), Canadian union leader and politician
- John J. Ballam (1882–1954), American Marxist activist and trade union organizer
- Michael Ballam (born 1952), American opera singer
