= Gossner Foods =

American cheese manufacturer

- Company type: Private
- Founded: 1966
- Headquarters: Logan, Utah
- Key people: Kristan Jo Earl CEO & President
- Website: https://gossner.com/

Gossner Foods is one of the largest Swiss cheese manufacturers in the United States, and is based in Logan, Utah.

== Overview ==
Gossner Foods specializes in producing varieties of Swiss cheese, but makes about 30 types of cheese all together. The company also produces UHT shelf stable milk for retail sale, and for the military. Gossner Foods has a contract to supply UHT milk to American troops stationed around the world.

The company is headquartered in Logan, and has a second plant in Heyburn, Idaho, and employs more than 600 people. Gossner buys milk from 300 farm families throughout Utah and Idaho.

As of 2018, the CEO is Kristan Jo Earl.

== History ==
Edwin Gossner Sr. was born in 1909 in the eastern region of Edliswil-Waldkirch, Switzerland. In 1930, he moved to Burke, Wisconsin, to work in his brother's cheese factory. After a three-year apprenticeship learning the techniques his brother acquired at the Swiss Cheesemaking School of Switzerland, Edwin took over the factory.

The factory burned down in 1937, so Gossner moved to California, where he worked for the Rumiano Cheese Company.

In 1941, Gossner opened a cheese factory in Cache Valley, Utah, a location he chose because the climate and elevation resembled that of Switzerland, and because of the abundant supply of local milk. In 1946, his factory was the largest Swiss cheese factory in the world, producing 120 200-pound (91 kg) wheels of cheese each day.

In 1966, Gossner founded the current company, Gossner Foods.

== See also ==
- List of cheesemakers
