= Darrell Babidge =

British singer

Darrell Babidge is an English operatic baritone and a professor at The Juilliard School along with William Burden, Amy Burton (soprano), Kevin Short (bass), Elizabeth Bishop, and Cynthia Hoffmann.

He holds a degree from the Royal Northern College of Music and a master's degree from BYU. He also holds a professional degree in vocal performance from the Manhattan School of Music.

Babidge has performed with the Chattanooga Symphony and Opera, Intermountain Opera and the Utah Festival Opera. He also performed with the Mormon Tabernacle Choir in their production of The Redeemer. He played the role of Joseph Smith in BYU's November 2005 performance of Murray Boren's opera The Book of Gold.

Among those who have studied under Babidge are Rachel Willis-Sørensen and Ginger Costa-Jackson.

Babidge is married to Jennifer Welch-Babidge.

== Sources ==
- bio from Babidge studios
- BYU College of Fine Arts and Communications bio
- BYU News article mentioning Babidge performing in "The Book of Gold"
- bio connected with "Book of Gold" promotion
- mention of Babidge performing in the Salt Lake Choral Artists database of articles on performances
- Deseret News, October 28, 2005
- article on the Utah Festival Opera mentioning Babidge
- Jan. 17, 2009 Mormon Times article on Mormon opera, mention to Babibde early in the article
