= Alaine Rodin =

American operatic soprano

Alaine Rodin (born May 8, 1967) is an American operatic soprano who has sung leading roles both in the United States and internationally.

== Biography ==
A native of Berkeley, California, she studied at the San Francisco Conservatory and the Juilliard School and trained with the Lyric Opera of Chicago's Young Artists programme, appearing in the LOC company premiere of Corigliano's The Ghosts of Versailles in 1990. She went on to sing Woglinde in Das Rheingold (New Orleans Opera), Antonia in Les contes d'Hoffmann (Opera Lirico de Costa Rica), Liù in Turandot (Guatemala City) and Marguerite in Faust (Augusta Opera). Rodin first came to international attention when appeared in the 1996-97 Broadway performances of Terrence McNally's Master Class, where she sang "Vieni t'affretta" from Verdi's Macbeth. She made her European début as Micaela in Carmen at the Opéra Comique in Paris in February 1999.

In 2007, she appeared at the Utah Festival Opera as Clara in Porgy and Bess and with West Bay Opera as Liza in The Queen of Spades.

As a member of the Linz Landestheater opera company during the 2008/2009 and 2009/2010 seasons, she has sung the title role in Shostakovich's Lady Macbeth of Mtsensk, Countess Almaviva in Le nozze di Figaro, Giulietta in Les contes d'Hoffmann and First Soprano in Philip Glass' opera Kepler, as well as singing with the company for the opera's North American premiere at the Brooklyn Academy of Music.

Her appearances on the concert stage have included those at Sarasota Opera and the Kyoto International Music Festival.

== Recordings ==
- William Schuman: The Mighty Casey – A Baseball Opera In Three Scenes and A Question of Taste; Juilliard Orchestra; 1994. Label: Delos Records
