= Logan, Utah =

City in Utah, United States

Logan
- City
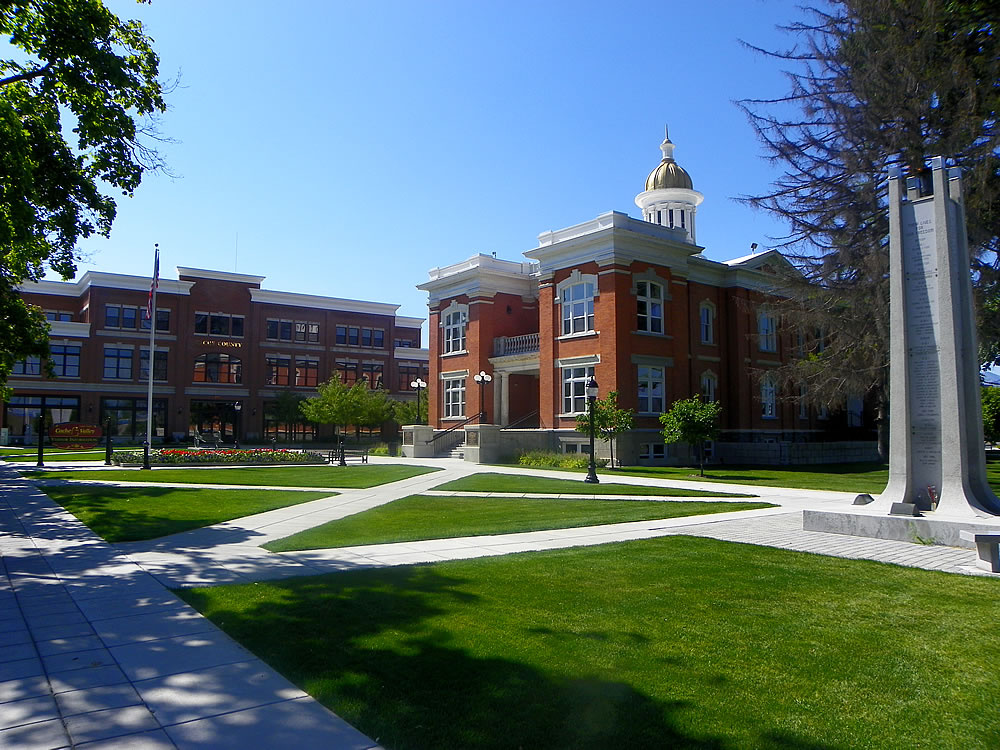
- Downtown Logan, pictured is the Cache County Historic Courthouse (built 1883)
- Motto: "United in Service"
- Interactive map of Logan
- Location within Utah Location within the United States
- Coordinates: 41°45′50″N 111°52′21″W
- Country: United States
- State: Utah
- County: Cache
- Founded: 1859
- Incorporated: January 17, 1866
- Named for: Ephraim Logan

Government
  - Type: Mayor-council
  - Mayor: Mark A. Anderson

Area
  - Total: 18.43 sq mi (47.74 km^{2})
  - Land: 17.85 sq mi (46.22 km^{2})
  - Water: 0.59 sq mi (1.52 km^{2})
- Elevation: 4,534 ft (1,382 m)

Population (2020)
  - Total: 52,778
  - Density: 2,957.5/sq mi (1,141.89/km^{2})
- Time zone: UTC−7 (Mountain (MST))
  - Summer (DST): UTC−6 (MDT)
- ZIP Codes: 84321-84323, 84341
- Area code: 435
- FIPS code: 49-45860
- GNIS ID: 2410856
- Website: www.loganutah.gov

Logan is a city in Cache County, Utah, United States. The 2020 census recorded the population at 52,778. Logan is the county seat of Cache County and the principal city of the Logan metropolitan area, which includes Cache County and Franklin County, Idaho. The Logan metropolitan area contained 147,908 people as of the 2020 census. Logan has the main campus of Utah State University.

== History ==
The town of Logan was founded in 1859 by settlers Brigham Young sent to survey for the site of a fort near the banks of the Logan River. They named their new community "Logan" for Ephraim Logan, an early fur trapper in the area. Logan was incorporated on January 17, 1866.

Brigham Young College was founded in Logan on August 6, 1877. Utah State University, originally called the Agricultural College of Utah, was founded in 1888. Brigham Young College, run by the Church of Jesus Christ of Latter-day Saints, closed in 1926 and its library and manuscripts were given to Utah State University.

Logan's growth reflects settlement and postwar booms along with other changes incidental to conditions in the West. Logan grew to about 20,000 in the mid-1960s, and according to census estimates, exceeded 50,000 in 2015.

== Geography ==
Logan is situated on the Logan River in northern Utah, about 47 miles (76 km) north of Ogden and 82 miles (132 km) north of Salt Lake City.

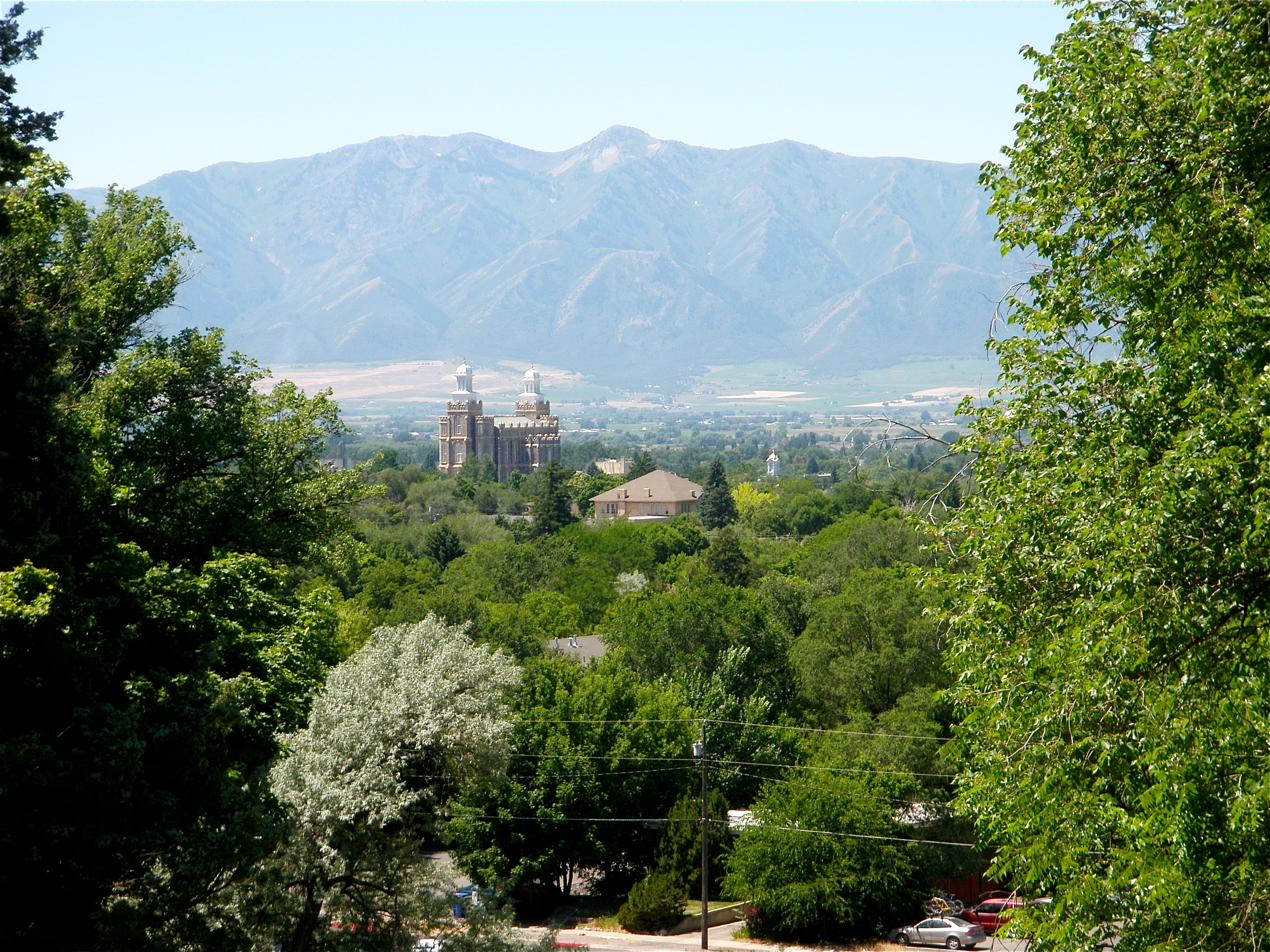
View over Logan and the LDS Temple and the Wellsville Range

According to the United States Census Bureau, the city has an area of 18.5 square miles (48.0 km^{2}), of which 18.0 square miles (46.5 km^{2}) is land and 0.58 square miles (1.5 km^{2}), or 3.16%, is water.

The city lies near the eastern edge of Cache Valley on the western slopes of the Bear River Mountains. Mount Logan rises to an elevation of 9,710 feet (2,960 m) immediately to the east, and south of Logan Canyon. The eastern portions of the city are atop shelf-like "benches", late Pleistocene sedimentary deposits created by the glacially fed Logan River feeding into the northern stretches of Lake Bonneville, building a "Gilbert-type" river delta over several thousand years. The Logan River later cut down through these sedimentary deposits after the draining of Lake Bonneville about 14,500 years ago. This created a low-lying area with very steep slopes that reach into the rest of town and to the Logan River bottomlands. West of Logan lie flatlands that contain both farmland and marshes. North and south of Logan are rapidly growing residential suburbs.

=== Climate ===
Logan has a humid continental climate (Köppen: Dsa) with very warm and usually dry summers and cold winters with moderate snowfall. Precipitation tends to be heaviest in the spring. Like other areas in northern Utah, during mid-winter, high-pressure systems often form over Cache Valley, leading to strong temperature inversions that trap cold air and pollutants and allow thick smog to accumulate in the valley about three percent of the time. This reduces the air quality to unhealthy levels and can result in the worst air pollution levels in the U.S.

Climate data for Logan, Utah (Utah State University), 1991–2020 normals, extremes 1893–present
Month	Jan	Feb	Mar	Apr	May	Jun	Jul	Aug	Sep	Oct	Nov	Dec	Year
Record high °F (°C)	60 (16)	64 (18)	77 (25)	86 (30)	94 (34)	99 (37)	103 (39)	101 (38)	98 (37)	89 (32)	74 (23)	66 (19)	103 (39)
Mean maximum °F (°C)	47.8 (8.8)	52.5 (11.4)	65.6 (18.7)	75.8 (24.3)	83.5 (28.6)	91.5 (33.1)	96.8 (36.0)	95.2 (35.1)	89.3 (31.8)	78.7 (25.9)	62.7 (17.1)	51.9 (11.1)	97.3 (36.3)
Mean daily maximum °F (°C)	32.2 (0.1)	36.9 (2.7)	48.2 (9.0)	56.5 (13.6)	66.8 (19.3)	77.9 (25.5)	88.2 (31.2)	86.6 (30.3)	75.6 (24.2)	60.7 (15.9)	45.3 (7.4)	33.6 (0.9)	59.0 (15.0)
Daily mean °F (°C)	24.9 (−3.9)	29.0 (−1.7)	39.0 (3.9)	46.3 (7.9)	55.6 (13.1)	64.9 (18.3)	74.2 (23.4)	72.8 (22.7)	62.8 (17.1)	49.7 (9.8)	36.9 (2.7)	26.3 (−3.2)	48.5 (9.2)
Mean daily minimum °F (°C)	17.6 (−8.0)	21.1 (−6.1)	29.8 (−1.2)	36.0 (2.2)	44.4 (6.9)	51.9 (11.1)	60.2 (15.7)	58.9 (14.9)	50.0 (10.0)	38.7 (3.7)	28.5 (−1.9)	18.9 (−7.3)	38.0 (3.3)
Mean minimum °F (°C)	1.9 (−16.7)	6.5 (−14.2)	15.7 (−9.1)	25.2 (−3.8)	32.7 (0.4)	39.8 (4.3)	51.2 (10.7)	49.2 (9.6)	37.4 (3.0)	25.6 (−3.6)	12.7 (−10.7)	2.9 (−16.2)	−1.9 (−18.8)
Record low °F (°C)	−23 (−31)	−23 (−31)	−6 (−21)	9 (−13)	16 (−9)	28 (−2)	36 (2)	35 (2)	24 (−4)	3 (−16)	−16 (−27)	−25 (−32)	−25 (−32)
Average precipitation inches (mm)	1.83 (46)	1.61 (41)	2.17 (55)	2.26 (57)	2.41 (61)	1.27 (32)	0.57 (14)	0.71 (18)	1.34 (34)	1.83 (46)	1.38 (35)	1.59 (40)	18.97 (479)
Average snowfall inches (cm)	12.9 (33)	12.2 (31)	8.5 (22)	4.1 (10)	0.3 (0.76)	0.0 (0.0)	0.0 (0.0)	0.0 (0.0)	0.0 (0.0)	1.4 (3.6)	6.3 (16)	15.8 (40)	61.5 (156.36)
Average extreme snow depth inches (cm)	10.2 (26)	10.1 (26)	6.3 (16)	2.5 (6.4)	0.3 (0.76)	0.0 (0.0)	0.0 (0.0)	0.0 (0.0)	0.0 (0.0)	1.1 (2.8)	3.5 (8.9)	7.8 (20)	12.8 (33)
Average precipitation days (≥ 0.01 in)	10.5	9.8	9.4	10.4	11.3	5.8	4.0	5.3	5.7	7.9	8.1	10.9	99.1
Average snowy days (≥ 0.1 in)	8.6	6.4	4.1	1.9	0.3	0.0	0.0	0.0	0.0	0.7	3.8	8.5	34.3
Source 1: NOAA
Source 2: National Weather Service

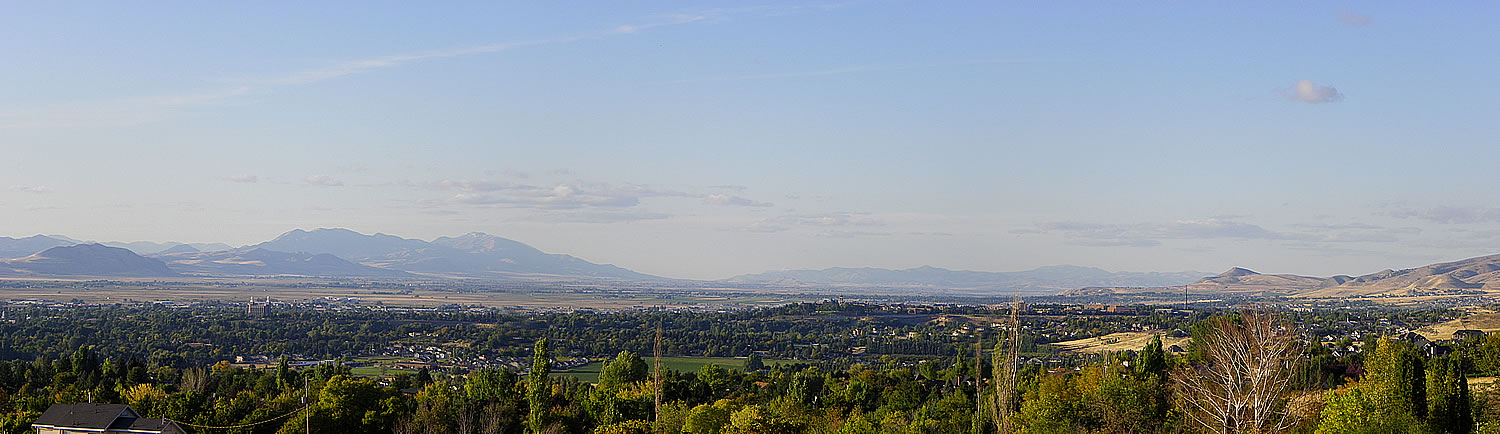
Overlooking the Logan area northward into Franklin County

== Demographics ==
Historical population
Census	Pop.	Note	%±
1870	1,757		—
1880	3,396		93.3%
1890	4,565		34.4%
1900	5,451		19.4%
1910	7,522		38.0%
1920	9,439		25.5%
1930	9,979		5.7%
1940	11,868		18.9%
1950	16,832		41.8%
1960	18,731		11.3%
1970	22,333		19.2%
1980	26,844		20.2%
1990	32,762		22.0%
2000	42,670		30.2%
2010	48,174		12.9%
2020	52,778		9.6%
2023 (est.)	55,250		4.7%

=== 2020 census ===
As of the 2020 census, Logan had a population of 52,778. The median age was 24.2 years, with 21.4% of residents under the age of 18 and 7.7% of residents 65 years of age or older. For every 100 females there were 97.6 males, and for every 100 females age 18 and over there were 96.2 males age 18 and over.

99.3% of residents lived in urban areas, while 0.7% lived in rural areas.

There were 17,808 households in Logan, of which 30.4% had children under the age of 18 living in them. Of all households, 48.3% were married-couple households, 21.0% were households with a male householder and no spouse or partner present, and 25.5% were households with a female householder and no spouse or partner present. About 21.6% of all households were made up of individuals and 6.3% had someone living alone who was 65 years of age or older.

There were 18,709 housing units, of which 4.8% were vacant. The homeowner vacancy rate was 1.0% and the rental vacancy rate was 3.3%.

Racial composition as of the 2020 census
Race	Number	Percentage
White	41,841	79.3%
Black or African American	823	1.6%
American Indian and Alaska Native	685	1.3%
Asian	1,460	2.8%
Native Hawaiian and Other Pacific Islander	452	0.9%
Some other race	3,562	6.7%
Two or more races	3,955	7.5%
Hispanic or Latino (of any race)	7,980	15.1%

=== 2010 census ===
As of the 2010 census, the population was 48,174. The racial makeup of the city in 2010 was 83.9% White, 1.0% African American, 1.0% Native American, 3.3% Asian, 0.5% Pacific Islander, 8.0% from other races, and 2.3% from two or more races. Hispanic or Latino of any race were 13.9% of the population.

=== 2000 census ===
As of the 2000 Census there were 13,902 households counted in Logan, out of which 33.4% had children under the age of 18 living with them, 55.1% were married couples living together, 7.7% had a female householder with no husband present, and 34.0% were non-families. 17.9% of all households were made up of individuals, and 5.7% had someone living alone who was 65 years of age or older. The average household size was 2.92 and the average family size was 3.2.

In the city, the population was spread out, with

- 23.4% under the age of 18
- 34.3% from 18 to 24
- 25.5% from 25 to 44
- 9.7% from 45 to 64
- 7.1% who were 65 years of age or older.

The median age was 24 years. For every 100 females, there were 92.1 males. For every 100 females age 18 and over, there were 89.5 males.

As of the 2000 Census the median income for a household in the city was $30,778, and the median income for a family was $33,784. Males had a median income of $27,304 versus $19,687 for females. The per capita income for the city was $13,765. About 12.6% of families and 22.7% of the population were below the poverty line, including 15.6% of those under age 18 and 6.4% of those age 65 or over.

== Economy ==
Logan has a wide range of economic sectors, with a focus on education, manufacturing and processing, medical services, agriculture, and retail businesses. The city's largest employers are Utah State University and Space Dynamics Laboratory. Other major employers include ICON Health & Fitness (IFIT), Campbell Scientific, Cache Valley Bank, Conservice, Cache County School District, Cytiva, Entegris, Gossner Foods, Intermountain Health, JBS USA, Lee's Marketplace, Logan Regional Hospital, Logan City School District, Pepperidge Farm, RR Donnelley, Thermo Fisher Scientific, TTM Technologies, S&S – Sansei Technologies, and Schreiber Foods.

=== Headquartered in Logan ===
- Utah State University – doctoral land-grant university
- Al's Sporting Goods - American chain of sporting goods stores
- Gossner Foods – dairy product manufacturer
- Ifrogz - manufacturer of cases for Apple products
- Infinite Discs - American disc golf equipment company
- Lee's Marketplace - chain of grocery stores based in Utah
- Space Dynamics Lab - aerospace and government contractor owned by Utah State University
- S&S Worldwide – manufacturer of amusement park rides
- Utah Festival Opera – founded and headquartered in Logan

=== Other ===
- PoliticIt - political website
- Crumbl Cookies - a cookie company that was started by students attending Utah State.

== Arts and culture ==
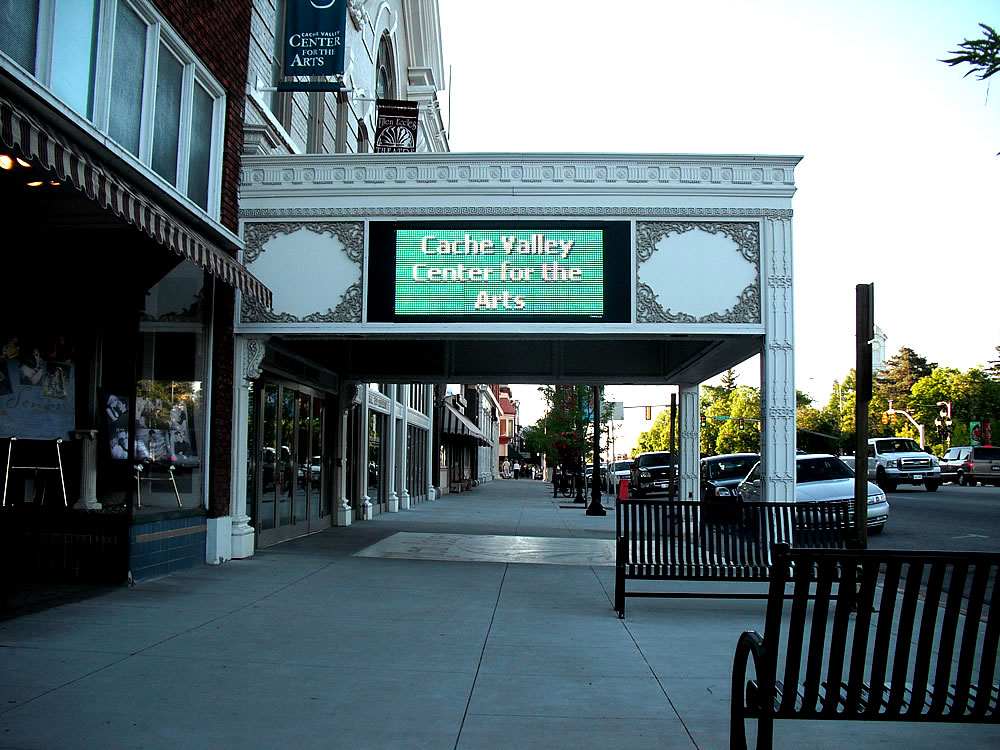
Ellen Eccles Theatre

Attractions and events include:

- Utah Festival Opera & Musical Theatre
- Ellen Eccles Theatre
- Summerfest Arts Faire, featuring fine arts, music, food, and children's activities.
- Cache Valley Cruise-In, Utah's largest automotive event, features vehicles, concerts, and a car parade.
- Summerfest Arts Faire showcases local artwork, food, and performers.
- LGBTQA Pride festival, founded in 2016.
- Logan Utah Temple, completed in 1884.

== Parks and recreation ==
Logan's Parks and Recreation department runs the Logan River Golf Course, the Logan/Cache County Fairgrounds, and the Logan Aquatic Center.

Zootah at Willow Park is a small zoo in Logan's Willow Park, with a small collection of wild animals including monkeys, coyotes, bobcats, bald eagles, and land birds and ducks.

Logan is the home of two full-length golf courses, the Logan River Golf Course and the Logan Golf and Country Club. Other golf courses are also found around the Cache Valley Area.

There are numerous events at the Logan/Cache County Fairgrounds including fairs, rodeos, and demolition derbies. Nearby, the city of Logan runs an aquatic center and a skate park. During the winter season, the city operates an outdoor ice skating rink at the Carol and Jim Laub Plaza.

== Government ==
The government of the city of Logan consists of the Executive Branch, led by an elected mayor; the Legislative Branch, led by a five-member city council; and the Judicial Branch, led by the city judge. Logan does not use districts for election purposes, as the mayor and council members are elected at-large.

The current mayor of Logan, Mark A. Anderson, was elected in November 2025. Current Logan City Council Members include Melissa Dahle, Mike Johnson, Katie Lee-Koven, Ernesto Lopez, and Jeannie F. Simmonds.

Alvin Crockett was the city's first mayor, elected on March 5, 1866. Other previous mayors include Holly H. Daines (2018-2026), Craig Petersen (2014-2018) and Randy Watts (2006-2014).

== Education ==
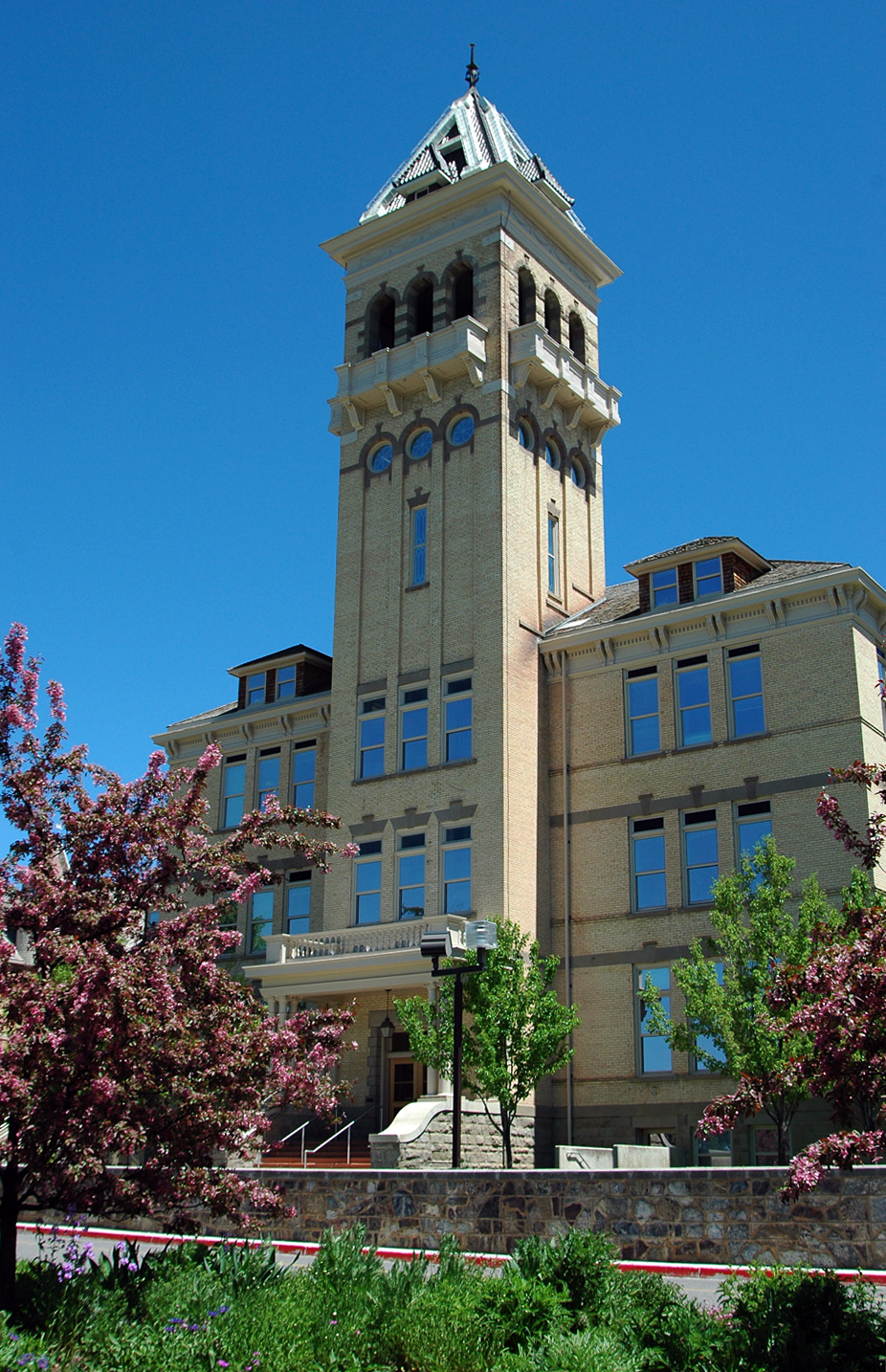
The Old Main building at Utah State University

Logan is served by two public school districts—mainly Logan City School District, but also Cache County School District for certain neighborhoods. There are eight public schools in the Logan City School District: six elementary schools, one middle school, and one high school, Logan High School. The Cache County School District has four high schools outside Logan in other cities.

Charter schools include Edith Bowen Laboratory School (K-6), on the USU campus, Bear River Charter School (K-6), and Fast Forward Charter High School.

InTech Collegiate Academy (often known simply as InTech) is in Logan and is a STEM-focused, early college high school partnered with USU.

Logan River Academy is an adolescent residential treatment center in the southern end of Logan.

=== Colleges and universities ===
- Bridgerland Technical College offers certificate programs across several industries.
- Utah State University offers bachelor's, master's, and doctoral degrees.

== Media ==
=== Newspapers ===
- The Herald Journal, a daily newspaper
- Cache Valley Daily, a news site operated by KVNU
- The Utah Statesman, a student-ran newspaper at Utah State University that occasionally covers broader local news

=== Television ===
- K08QL-D and K22MH-D, translators of KCSG Cedar City.
- KCVB-LD ("The Valley Channel"), a local television station providing community-oriented programs.

=== Radio ===
- Utah Public Radio is a statewide National Public Radio affiliate headquartered on the Logan campus of Utah State University.
- KVNU, news, sports and talk.
- KBLQ, soft rock
- KVFX, Top 40

== Infrastructure ==
=== Transportation ===
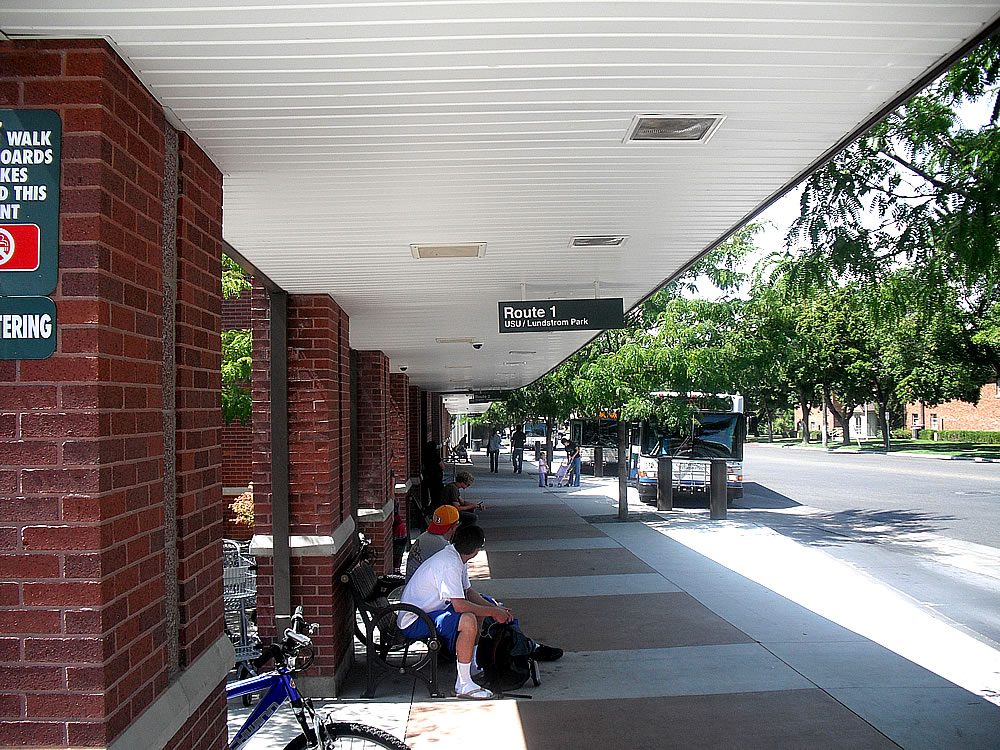
Downtown transit station

In 2009, the Logan metropolitan statistical area (MSA) ranked eighth-highest in the U.S. for commuters who biked to work (3.3%).

==== Highways ====
- US-89
- US-91

==== Transit ====
Logan is served by a local sales-tax-funded zero-fare bus system, Connect Transit, formerly named Cache Valley Transit District (CVTD), which incorporated the Logan Transit District (LTD) in 2007. The LTD system began in 1992 with six routes in Logan. Service outside Logan began with the formation of CVTD in 2001. The system has 15 routes that serve Logan and the adjacent cities of North Logan and River Heights. These include a northern route that reaches as far as Richmond and a southern route that serves the southern suburbs and Hyrum. There is also a five-time daily connection to Lewiston and Preston, Idaho.

==== Air travel ====
The public general aviation airport is Logan–Cache Airport, which provides flight instruction and private air charter services.

== Notable people ==
- Jawahir Ahmed, model and beauty pageant winner
- Neil L. Andersen, LDS Church apostle born in Logan
- Rocky Anderson, mayor of Salt Lake City 2000–2008
- Stephen O. Andersen, economist and environmentalist, one of the founders and leading figures in the success of the Montreal Protocol on Substances that Deplete the Ozone Layer
- Michael Ballam, opera singer, founder of Utah Festival Opera Company
- Elaine Bradley, member of Neon Trees rock band
- Hugh B. Brown military officer, politician, LDS Church leader
- Reed Budge, Idaho legislator
- Charles Bullen, politician
- Shay Carl, internet celebrity
- Ron Carlson, novelist and short story writer
- Quentin L. Cook, LDS Church apostle
- Chris Cooley, Washington Redskins football player
- Kevin Curtis, NFL football player
- Marriner Eccles, former chairman of the Federal Reserve Bank
- Luke Falk, football player for Washington State University, New York Jets
- Rulon Gardner, 2000 Olympic gold medalist (Greco-Roman wrestling)
- Hal Garner, football player for the Buffalo Bills
- John Gilbert, silent film star
- Kenny Griffin, Olympic gymnast
- Lars Peter Hansen, economist, 2013 recipient of the Nobel Memorial Prize in Economic Sciences for empirical analysis of asset prices
- Morris R. Jeppson, weapons test officer, Enola Gay
- Robert M. Kimmitt, former Deputy Secretary of the Treasury, United States Ambassador to Germany
- Russell Maughan, pioneer aviator, first person to fly across America in a single day
- Joseph M. Newman, film director
- Chase Nielsen, member of Doolittle Raid
- Merlin Olsen, football player for Los Angeles Rams, actor and TV personality
- L. Tom Perry, LDS Church apostle
- Casey Robinson, screenwriter and film producer
- Lenore Romney, former First Lady of Michigan, mother of Mitt Romney
- Alan Stauffer, Wyoming legislator, born in Logan
- May Swenson, poet
- Jean Sullivan, actress
- Kip Thorne, astronomer, physicist, 2017 Nobel laureate for the observation of gravitational waves
- John W. Welch, law and religion scholar
- Larry Winborg, illustrator and gallery owner
- Evelyn Wood, speed-reading entrepreneur

== See also ==
- List of cities and towns in Utah
- Utah State University
- Logan Canyon
