= Master Class =

Play written by Terrence McNally

- Original language: English
- Written by: Terrence McNally
- Characters: Maria Callas; Sophie De Palma (First Soprano); Anthony Candolino (Tenor); Sharon Graham (Second Soprano); Emmanuel Weinstock (Accompanist); Stagehand
- Subject: A diva holds a master class in voice for the opera
- Genre: Drama
- Setting: A master class with Maria Callas in the 1970s

Premiere
- Date: November 5, 1995
- Place: John Golden Theatre; New York City, New York

Master Class is a 1995 play by American playwright Terrence McNally, presented as a fictional master class by opera singer Maria Callas near the end of her life, in the 1970s. The play features incidental vocal music by Giuseppe Verdi, Giacomo Puccini, and Vincenzo Bellini. The play opened on Broadway in 1995, with stars Zoe Caldwell and Audra McDonald winning Tony Awards.

== Plot ==
The opera diva Maria Callas, a glamorous, commanding, caustic and witty teacher, is holding a singing master class. Alternately dismayed and impressed by the students before her, she retreats into recollections about her own life and career. Included in her musings are her fierce hatred of her rivals, the unforgiving press that savaged her early performances, her triumphs at La Scala, and her relationship with Aristotle Onassis. The play culminates in a monologue about the sacrifices made in the name of art.

== Production history ==
The play was originally staged by the Philadelphia Theatre Company in March 1995, as well as by the Mark Taper Forum and the Kennedy Center.

The play premiered on Broadway at the John Golden Theatre on November 15, 1995, and closed on June 29, 1997, after 598 performances and twelve previews. Directed by Leonard Foglia, the original cast featured Zoe Caldwell (as Callas), Audra McDonald (as Sharon), Karen Kay Cody, David Loud, Jay Hunter Morris, and Michael Friel. Patti LuPone (from July 1996) and Dixie Carter (from January 1997) subsequently replaced Caldwell as Callas. Later in the run, Matthew Walley replaced Morris and Alaine Rodin replaced McDonald. Beginning with LuPone in July 1996, Gary Green starred as Manny, the accompanist. Green continued in this role on Broadway until November 1996 and in the subsequent US tour. LuPone played the role in the West End production at the Queens Theatre, which opened in April 1997 (previews). Faye Dunaway played the role in the U.S. national tour in 1996.

Master Class ran at the Kennedy Center from March 25, 2010 to April 18, 2010, directed by Stephen Wadsworth and starring Tyne Daly as Callas. The play was then revived on Broadway in a Manhattan Theatre Club production at the Samuel J. Friedman Theatre, running from June 14, 2011 (previews) to September 4, 2011 for 70 regular performances and 26 previews. Directed by Stephen Wadsworth, the cast featured Tyne Daly as Callas, with Sierra Boggess as Sharon and Alexandra Silber as Sophie. This production transferred to the West End at the Vaudeville Theatre from January to April 2012, with Daly as Callas and Naomi O'Connell as Sharon.

A 2010/11 UK touring production of the play starred Stephanie Beacham as Callas.

A 1997 production in Paris, Master Class – La leçon de chant (The Singing Lesson), starred Fanny Ardant as Callas and was directed by Roman Polanski. It was revived in 2000 and 2008, both times starring Marie Laforêt.

In 1997, Norma Aleandro played the role of Maria Callas at the Teatro Maipo in Buenos Aires, in a production directed by Agustín Alezzo. In 2012, Aleandro and Alezzo staged a new version of the play.

An Australian production in 1997 starred Robyn Nevin as Callas. Nevin played the role in Brisbane and Sydney. Amanda Muggleton then played Callas in Adelaide in 1998 and Melbourne in 1999. Muggleton reprised the role in the 2001/02 Australian touring production and won the 2002 Helpmann Award for Best Actress in a Play.

Jelisaveta Seka Sablić played Callas in the 1997 production of the Bitef theater, which later toured other theaters in Belgrade and Serbia, as well as Switzerland in 2005. Soprano Radmila Smiljanić served as music supervisor. Sablić was awarded the Miloš Žutić Award for the role.

In 2014, Maria Mercedes starred in an Australian production of the play, which was well received by critics; one reviewer wrote, "It's an awe-inspiring performance by any measure." She was nominated for several awards, winning the Green Room Award for Female Performer for Independent Theatre. It was the first time in professional theatre that a woman of Greek heritage had played Maria Callas. The production moved to Sydney in August 2015, before returning to Melbourne in September.

In 2018 and 2019, a production of Master Class was staged in Athens, Greece, at the Dimitris Horn Theatre, with Greek actress Maria Nafpliotou in the starring role. The production was well received by critics and by February 2019 had sold out 125 consecutive performances.

== Cast and characters ==
Character	Broadway	US National Tour	West End	Broadway Revival
Character	1995	1996	1997	2011
Maria Callas	Zoe Caldwell	Faye Dunaway	Patti LuPone	Tyne Daly
Sharon	Audra McDonald	Suzan Hanson	Susan Roper	Sierra Boggess
Sophie	Karen Kay Cody	Melinda Klump	Sophia Wylie	Alexandra Silber
Manny	David Loud	Gary Green	David Schrubsole	Jeremy Cohen
Tony	Jay Hunter Morris	Kevin Paul Anderson	David Maxwell Anderson	Garrett Sorenson
Stagehand	Michael Friel	Scott Davidson	Kenneth Hadley	Clinton Brandhagen

Notable replacements

- Broadway (1995–1997) Maria Callas: Patti LuPone, Dixie Carter

== Critical reception ==
Ben Brantley, in his review of the 2011 Broadway revival for The New York Times, wrote that, although Master Class is not "a very good play", he felt that Tyne Daly "transforms that script into one of the most haunting portraits I've seen of life after stardom."

== Awards and nominations ==
Master Class won both the 1996 Drama Desk Award for Outstanding New Play and the 1996 Tony Award for Best Play. Zoe Caldwell won the 1996 Tony Award for Actress in a Play, and Audra McDonald won the 1996 Tony Award for Featured Actress in a Play.

The 2011 Broadway production was nominated for Best Revival of a Play at the 66th Tony Awards.
