= Thor Steingraber =

American director and arts administrator

Thor Steingraber is an American opera and theater director, and arts administrator. After serving as executive director of the Soraya Performing Arts Center at California State University, Northridge in Los Angeles for twelve years, he is currently president and chief executive of Vivo Performing Arts in Boston.

== Early life and education ==
Steingraber was born and raised in Chicago and in 1988 graduated from Indiana University where he studied theater. He also earned a master's degree from the Harvard Kennedy School at Harvard University in 2009.

== Career ==
Steingraber has held several leadership positions at American performing arts centers: Kimmel Center in Philadelphia, where he was senior vice president; the Los Angeles Music Center where he was Vice President of Programming; the Valley Performing Arts Center (also known as the Soraya), located on the campus of California State University, Northridge, where he was the Executive Director from 2014 to 2026; and Vivo Performing Arts in Boston (formerly Celebrity Series of Boston), where he was appointed president and chief executive in 2026. While in Philadelphia, Kimmel Center and The Philadelphia Orchestra underwent a period of protracted negotiations during the Orchestra’s bankruptcy proceedings. Steingraber was instrumental in leading the Kimmel Center’s response during this transitional period. In Los Angeles, Steingraber oversaw the opening of Grand Park in downtown Los Angeles, an extension of the public/private partnership between The Music Center and Los Angeles County.

During Steingraber's tenure at the Soraya, he supervised more than 120 productions, which included commissions, premieres, and the introduction of a winter jazz festival. He initiated collaborations between musicians and dancers, focusing curation on the population of the San Fernando Valley. In 2017, the Soraya secured a 17 million dollar endowment gift from the Nazarian family, which resulted in a venue name change. Musical America named Steingraber to its list of notable industry professionals in 2023. In 2024, one observer described Steingraber as having "a knack for introducing great artists and ensembles to one another and drawing out amazing synergistic performances." In 2026, another journalist commented that Steingraber had transformed the Soraya from a venue searching for its identity into one of Southern California's most innovative and dependable cultural hubs.

Steingraber has directed operas for many years, and his work has been seen in cities across America, from New York's Lincoln Center to the San Francisco Opera. He has also directed in Asia (the Hong Kong Arts Festival) and made his European debut in 2010 in Barcelona. He has directed 400 years of operatic repertoire in five languages, but is particularly known for his renderings of Mozart's operas (Santa Fe, Los Angeles, Austin, Memphis, Indianapolis, Philadelphia, New York, and Pittsburgh).

Steingraber's multi-disciplinary collaborations range from young painters at the Chicago arts magnet school to designers like Maurice Sendak and David Hockney. In recent years, Thor's work has turned to Wagner—in Los Angeles and San Francisco he directed Tristan und Isolde, and in Chicago, he was the Associate Director of Wagner's Ring Cycle, starring Plácido Domingo. He also works for Mr. Domingo at the Los Angeles Opera, the company that has been Steingraber's artistic home for fourteen years.

Since 2002, Steingraber has taught singers in universities and conservatories, including the Curtis Institute, Yale University School of Music and California State University where he was Distinguished Guest Artist in 2008. Steingraber teaches acting and scene-work, with an emphasis on character development employing a broad range of analytic processes.

Steingraber is a writer. His recent articles can be seen in The Boston Globe, the Harvard Kennedy School Review, and Inside Arts. He also wrote Canta Luna, a play about Spanish playwright Federico García Lorca who was executed in the early days of the Spanish Civil War. Canta Luna was produced at the Boston Court Theater in Pasadena, California in 2006.

In 2008 and 2009, Steingraber was in residence at Harvard Kennedy School, where he was a Mid Career Fellow for Arts, Culture and Media at the Hauser Center for Nonprofit Organizations. He also received a Masters in Public Administration at Harvard's Kennedy School, focusing on the management of nonprofit organizations and the intersection of public policy and the arts. For his work at the Kennedy School, he was awarded the annual Littauer award.

His own management experiences began with founding an inner-city youth theater program in conjunction with the San Francisco YMCA. Later, he was Director of Production at the Utah Festival Opera. Since its inception, Thor was responsible for planning and implementing the growth of the Festival, including the development of a new 40,000-square-foot (3,700 m^{2}) production facility and the implementation of an OSHA safety program.

== Opera (directed) ==
- Tristan und Isolde at the Los Angeles Opera (2008) and the San Francisco Opera (2006)
- I Capuleti e i Montecchi at the Pittsburgh Opera (2008), New York City Opera (2001), Minnesota Opera (2001) and Los Angeles Opera (1999)
- Recovered Voices at the Los Angeles Opera (2007)
- La traviata at the Lyric Opera of Chicago (2005), Palm Beach Opera (2004), Pittsburgh Opera (2004) and Cincinnati Opera (2002)
- Le nozze di Figaro at the Austin Lyric Opera (2005), Santa Fe Opera (2000) and Los Angeles Opera (1997)
- Jenůfa at the Utah Symphony and Opera (2005)
- Elektra at the Pittsburgh Opera (2003)
- Don Giovanni at the New York City Opera (2002), Opera Pacific (2002) and Pittsburgh Opera (2001)
- Nabucco at the Los Angeles Opera (2002) and Houston Grand Opera (2000)
- Brundibar at the Chicago Opera Theater (2002)
- La Cenerentola at the Pittsburgh Opera (2002), Los Angeles Opera (2000) and the Hong Kong Arts Festival (2001)
- Tosca at the Lyric Opera Kansas City (2001) and Utah Festival Opera (1997)
- Lucia di Lammermoor at the Santa Fe Opera (2001)
- Madama Butterfly at the Utah Symphony and Opera (2001)
- Noye's Fludde at the Chicago Opera Theater (2001)
- Fidelio at the Utah Symphony and Opera (1999)
- Così fan tutte at Opera Memphis (1993) and Indianapolis Opera (1994)
- Zémire et Azor at Opera Memphis (1994)

== Personal life ==
Steingraber was at the center of an important legal case in the early 1990s dealing with healthcare discrimination based on sexual orientation.
