= Liederkranz of the City of New York =

Choral society

The Liederkranz of New York City is an organization devoted to cultural and social exchange as well as the sponsorship of musical events. Its activities are dedicated to the support, development and preservation of culture in New York City. Its objective once was to enhance German-American relations.

== History ==
On January 9, 1847, twenty-five men of German heritage founded the Deutscher Liederkranz der Stadt New York, a male singing society that provided a musical and social outlet for German-American men and also sought to perpetuate the tradition of German music, in both the folk and classical traditions.

By 1861, the society was invited to sing with the Philharmonic Society Orchestra, and its performances of Wagner excerpts at the Metropolitan Opera House and in Boston and Philadelphia were among the first performances of Wagner in the United States. The Chorus sang at the World Columbian Exposition in Chicago. Ferrucio Busoni performed piano works at this concert and others on the Liederkranz’s tour. Many well-known musicians have collaborated with the Liederkranz, including Jenny Lind, Victor Herbert, Ernestine Schumann-Heink, Raphael Josephi, Lilli Lehmann, Helen Traubel, and Lauritz Melchior. The Club has also feted Engelbert Humperdinck, Richard Strauss, and Siegfried Wagner. Well-known members of the Liederkranz include Carl Schurz and William Steinway, who acted intermittently as President from 1867 until 1896. Conductor Theodore Thomas, music director from 1882 to 1884 and from 1887 to 1888, used the Liederkranz choir in Wagner concerts. Composer Heinrich Zöllner was conductor and music director from 1890 to 1898. The organisation was officially renamed to "The Liederkranz of the City of New York" in 1919. Honorary members have included President Theodore Roosevelt, Walter Damrosch, and Lauritz Melchior.

The Liederkranz has been involved in numerous charitable efforts for the benefit of New York City and its institutions, the Quaker Fund for German Relief, the destitute of the Chicago Fire, etc. The Society established the Liederkranz Foundation, Inc. on April 8, 1948, for the purpose of providing support to young singers and musicians to further their careers. In December 1999 the Liederkranz of the City of New York donated its library of music scores and parts, Liederkranz Club and Liederkranz Foundation documents, and related materials to the Fales Library at NYU.

== Award winners ==
Notable winners of the Liederkranz Foundation's annual vocal competition include:

- John Brancy, 2010
- Jim Burgess, 1987
- Amanda Forsythe, 2003
- Bruce Fowler, 1993
- Othalie Graham, 2003
- Megan Marie Hart, 2012
- Kathleen Kim, 2004

== Liederkranz Hall ==
In 1881, while under the leadership of club president William Steinway, the club raised $150,000 in two days for the purpose of building a clubhouse and performance venue, Liederkranz Hall. The cornerstone was laid on October 1, 1881, at 111-119 East 58th Street in New York City. The total cost of the four-story brownstone building, including land, was $325,000. Liederkranz Hall became a well-respected music venue, and beginning in the 1920s, the location of numerous recording sessions for both Victor and Columbia Records. During World War I, the club's Board of Trustees passed resolutions offering Liederkranz Hall to the U.S. government for the duration of the war, prompting commendations from President Theodore Roosevelt. Faced with declining membership in the late 1940s, the club sold the building, which was eventually utilized as a recording venue for Columbia Records and converted into four television studios for CBS in 1950.

== See also ==
- Arion Society of New York

== Sources ==
- Merian, Hans; Egg, Bernhard (1913). Illustrierte Geschichte der Musik von der Renaissance bis auf die Gegenwart [Illustrated history of music from the Renaissance to the present time] (in German) (3 ed.). Leipzig: Otto Spamer. p. 774.
- Saffle, Michael (1998). Music and Culture in America, 1861–1918. New York and London: Garland Publishing. ISBN 0815321252.
