= Alexandra Silber =

American actress and writer

- Born: Los Angeles, California, U.S.
- Education: Royal Conservatoire of Scotland
- Occupations: Actress, singer, writer
- Years active: 2005–present
- Website: alexandrasilber.net

Alexandra Silber is an American actress, singer, writer and educator. She has performed roles on Broadway, in London's West End, on television and film, and concert stages. Among other stage roles, in London, she created the role of Laura Fairlie in The Woman in White (2005), played Hodel in Fiddler on the Roof (2007) and Julie Jordan in Carousel (2008). In New York, she appeared in Hello Again (2010), Master Class (2011), created the role of Sara Jane in Arlington (2012–14) and as Tzeitel in the Broadway revival of Fiddler on the Roof (2015).

Silber's debut novel After Anatevka (chronicling what happens to the characters of Hodel and Perchik made famous by the Sholem Aleichem stories and in the musical Fiddler on the Roof) and White Hot Grief Parade, a memoir about losing her father to cancer when she was 18, were both published by Pegasus Books in 2018.

== Life and career ==
Silber was born in Los Angeles, and raised in metro-Detroit. She is the daughter of Catherine (née Noriega) and Michael D. Silber. Her father is Jewish and her mother, who is of Hispanic and Irish descent, is Catholic. She is a graduate of the Interlochen Center for the Arts and the Royal Conservatoire of Scotland. In July 2005 she made her West End debut as Laura Fairlie in the original production of Andrew Lloyd Webber's The Woman in White. She returned to the West End in 2007–2008 to portray Hodel in Fiddler on the Roof and again in 2008–2009 to perform the role of Julie Jordan in Carousel at The Savoy Theatre.

In 2010, Silber made her American stage debut as Julie Jordan with the Reprise Theatre Company in Los Angeles. In 2011 she appeared as the Young Wife in the Off-Broadway revival of Michael John LaChiusa's Hello Again and as Sophie De Palma, opposite Tyne Daly and Sierra Boggess, in the Kennedy Center and Broadway revival of Terrence McNally's Master Class. In 2012 she performed the role of Nina in a concert version of Robert Wright and George Forrest's Song of Norway at Carnegie Hall. That same year she appeared as Jenny in the United States premiere of Howard Goodall's Love Story at the Walnut Street Theater in Philadelphia, and was seen Off-Broadway in Nora Ephron's Love, Loss, and What I Wore.

In 2013 Silber performed in concert and recorded the role of Maria in West Side Story with the San Francisco Symphony under the baton of Michael Tilson Thomas. That recording was nominated for the 2015 Grammy Award for Best Musical Theater Album, and Silber performed music from West Side Story at the 57th Annual Grammy Awards. In the summer of 2013 she appeared as Amalia Balash opposite Santino Fontana in Jerry Bock's She Loves Me at the Caramoor International Music Festival. In December 2013 she performed in the world premiere of David Del Tredici’s Dum Dee Tweedle with the Detroit Symphony Orchestra under Leonard Slatkin. In 2014 Silber starred in Victor Lodato and Polly Pen's Off-Broadway musical Arlington. Later that year she was the soprano soloist in Andrew Lippa's oratorio I Am Harvey Milk with the Gay Men's Chorus of Los Angeles at Walt Disney Concert Hall.

In the summer of 2015 she performed the role of Eliza Doolittle in Lerner and Loewe's My Fair Lady at The Muny in St. Louis. She is appearing as Tzeitel in the 2015–2016 Broadway production of Fiddler on the Roof and most recently, originated the role of the Countess Andreyni in Ken Ludwig's adaptation of Agatha Christie's "Murder on the Orient Express at the McCarter Theater. She has been described by The New York Times as "glamorous and hyper-articulate," and by The Huffington Post as "the fastest-rising soprano in Musical Theater."

Silber's screen credits include guest roles on the television series Law & Order, Law & Order: Criminal Intent, Law & Order: Special Victims Unit and The Mysteries of Laura. She also appeared in the 2007 Stephen King horror film 1408. In 2014 she played the title role in Kiss Me, Kate in the BBC Proms at Royal Albert Hall. She performed on that program again in 2015, this time singing music from West Side Story and Candide. In January 2015 she appeared on PBS' Great Performances as a part of the Live from Lincoln Center series, performing the balcony scene from West Side Story at Avery Fisher Hall for the October 2014 Richard Tucker Opera Gala.

Silber starred as Manke in the London premiere of Paula Vogel's Indecent, playing two performances before the production was closed due to the COVID-19 pandemic.

In 2022, Silber starred in Lend Me a Soprano, a gender-bent revision of Ken Ludwig's Lend Me a Tenor which ran at Alley Theatre in Houston, Texas from September 16 until October 9

== Work as a writer and educator ==
Silber's debut novel After Anatevka (chronicling what happens to the characters of Hodel and Perchik made famous by the Sholem Aleichem stories and in the musical Fiddler on the Roof) and White Hot Grief Parade, a memoir about losing her father to cancer when she was 18, were both published by Pegasus Books in 2018. As a playwright, Silber has written modern language adaptations of three classic Greek tragedies through a commission by the Dutch Kills Theater. The first work she adapted, Sophocles' Antigone, premiered at the National Opera Center in New York City on February 2, 2015 in a staged reading with a cast that included John Cullum, Peter Scolari, Alexandra Socha, Jason Tam, and Silber. The second work she penned, a modern English translation of Euripides' 415BC tragedy The Trojan Women, was given its first fully staged performance at the Hangar Theatre in Ithaca, New York on June 18, 2015.
