= Alan Stauffer =

American politician

Member of the Wyoming House of Representatives
- In office 1977–1990

Personal details
- Born: April 21, 1945 (age 81) Logan, Utah, U.S.
- Party: Republican
- Education: Brigham Young University

Alan Stauffer (born April 21, 1945) is an American politician. He served as a Republican member of the Wyoming House of Representatives.

Stauffer was born in Logan, Utah. He attended Brigham Young University.

Stauffer served in the Wyoming House of Representatives from 1977 to 1990.
