= Othalie Graham =

Canadian and American dramatic soprano

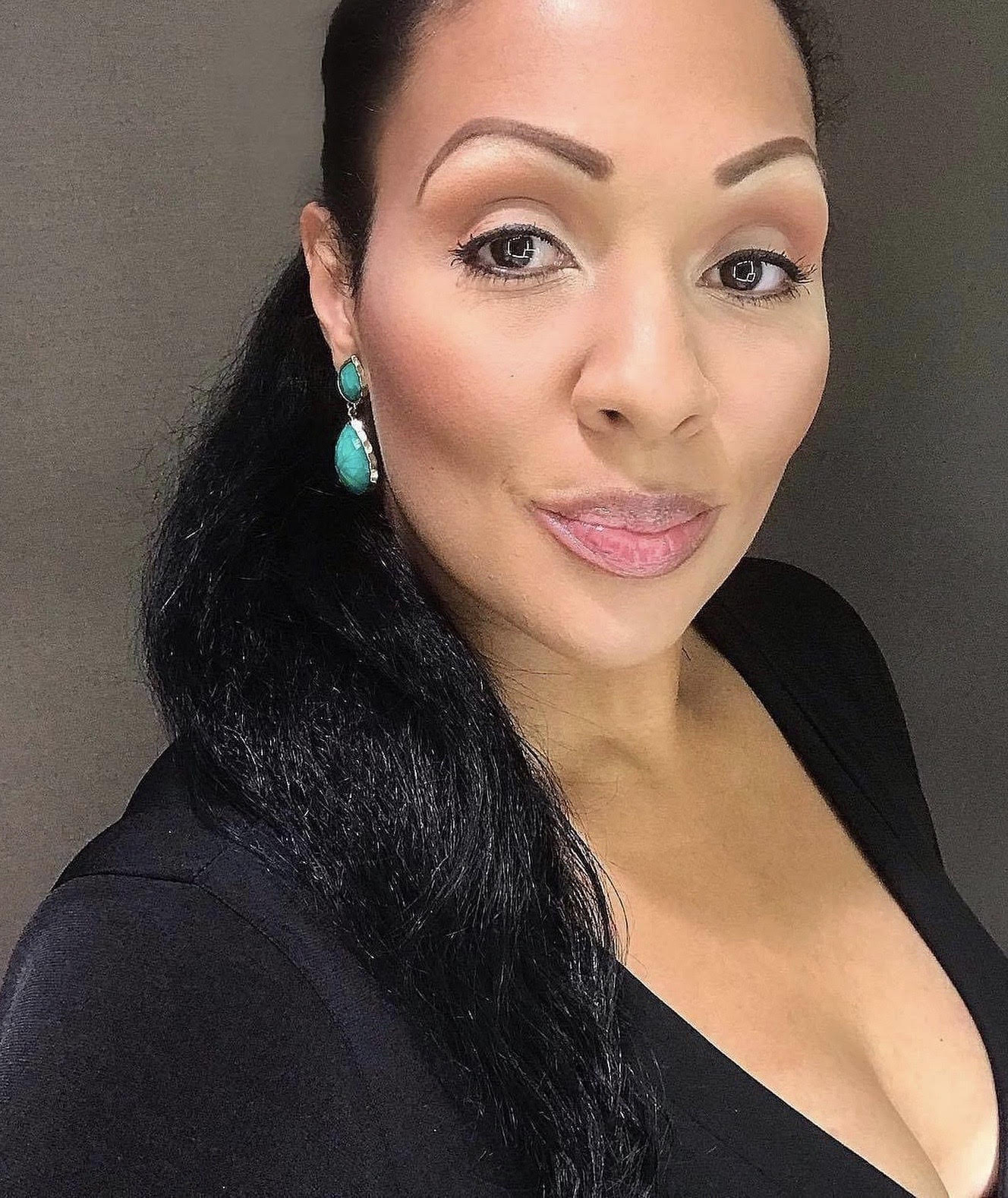
Othalie Graham

Othalie Graham (born 1977) is a Canadian and American dramatic soprano, known for operatic roles such as Turandot in Turandot, Tosca in Tosca, Minnie in La fanciulla del West, Aida in Aida, Elektra in Elektra and Ariadne in Ariadne Auf Naxos.

== Early years ==
Graham was born in Brampton, Ontario. Her father, a Jamaican-born Canadian, instilled in Graham a strong identification with Jamaican music and culture. When Graham was young, her father sparked her interest in opera by taking her to see a Leontyne Price recital. Her passion in opera grew while attending high school at the Etobicoke School of the Arts. While in Canada, Graham was awarded first place in the Jeunes Ambassadeurs Lyriques Competition and received the coveted Jean Chalmers prize in the Canadian Music Competition.

Graham attended the Academy of Vocal Arts after studying under Lois McDonall. At AVA, she studied under Bill Schuman and continues to study with him. Graham has won the Opera at Florham voice competition as well as the Liederkranz Foundations's annual competition, where she made her New York City recital debut. She was also the New Jersey district winner of the Metropolitan Opera National Council Auditions and a finalist in the Palm Beach Opera Competition. Graham also spent a summer training under the widely admired Italian opera singer Renata Scotto at the Renata Scotto Opera Academy at the Music Conservatory of Westchester.

== Career ==
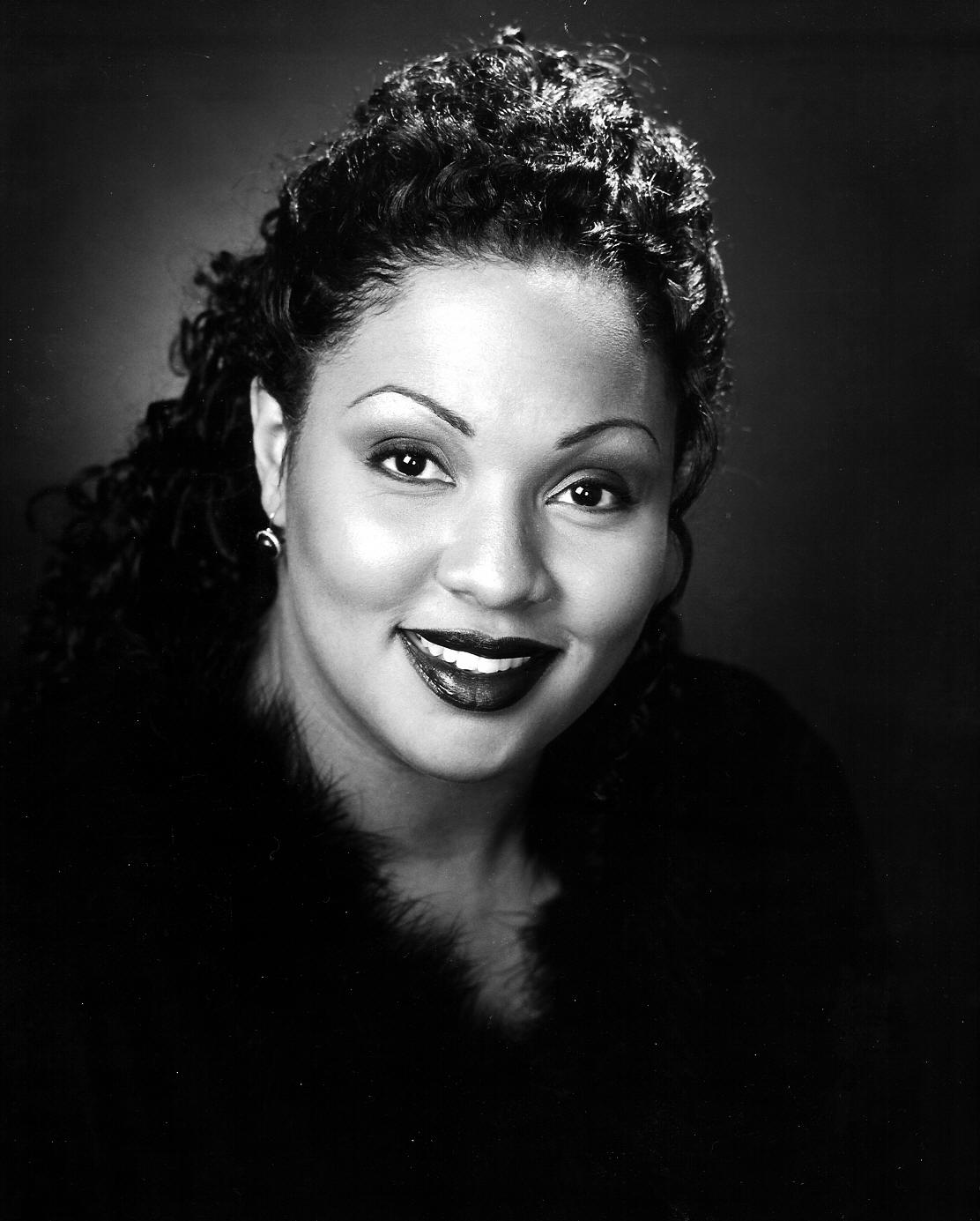
Othalie Graham

Graham started her professional career in October 2004 in the title role of Puccini's Turandot at OperaDelaware, a roll in which she repeated at the Utah Festival Opera. Her performance was well received, with one reviewer writing she "has a huge, powerful voice that fills the auditorium and navigates the musical difficulties beautifully" another writing, "a statuesque soprano with both power and sweetness in a disciplined voice."

In 2005, she was awarded the prestigious Sullivan Foundation Grant.

In 2006, her performance in the production of "Turandot" at the Sacramento Opera was identified as the single reason that its success was never in question. In July 2006, Graham added title role of Floria Tosca in Giacomo Puccini's opera Tosca.

In 2007, Graham added the role of Odabella in Attila as part of her Sarasota Opera debut, where she "blasted Young-Bok Kim's Attila off his throne" with "a big wagnerian voice."

On September 25, 2007, Her performance of "Aida" at El Paso Opera House was amazing having critic Paul Westman saying "At the end of the scene I was blown out of my seat by the loudest E flat that I have ever heard in my life! The interesting thing is that the note did not "sound HIGH" to my ear as it usually does at end of a cabaletta. It was huge and cut through the opera house like a laser beam!".

== Awards ==
- First place in the Jeunes Ambassadeurs Lyriques Competition
- Jean Chalmers prize in the Canadian Music Competition
- Winner of Edward Johnson Competition
- Winner of Opera at Florham Voice Competition
- Winner of Liederkranz Society Competition in Wagner division
- New Jersey district winner of the Metropolitan Opera National Council Auditions
- Finalist in Palm Beach Opera Competition
- Sullivan Foundation Grant recipient
- First place winner in the Gerda Lissner International Vocal Competition in Wagner Division
- First place winner of the Joyce Dutka Competition
