= Larry Winborg =

Larry Winborg (born 1942) is an illustrator. His works have appeared in Audubon, Sports Illustrated, LDS magazines and the Sierra Club. His painting "Faith In Every Footstep" is in the Church of Jesus Christ of Latter-day Saints museum and he was honored in 1991 at the Jackson Hole, Wyoming national Arts For The Parks competition. His work has been shown at a number of galleries since the early 1990s. Many of his works feature scenes from the Western United States, including the Rocky Mountains, where he grew up.

Winborg's "A Test of Faith and Ice" was entered in the LDS Church's Sixth International Art Competition.

Winborg operates an art gallery in Logan, Utah.
