= Ellen Eccles Theatre =

Theatre in Logan, UT

Coordinates: 41°43′50″N 111°50′07″W

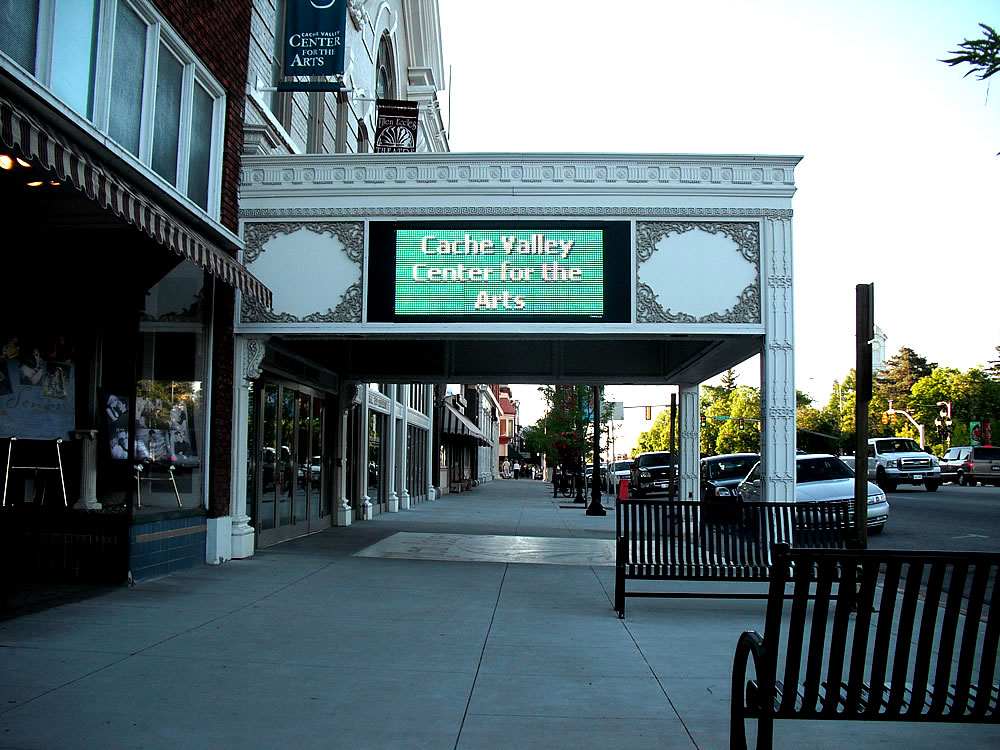
A view of the Ellen Eccles Theater in Downtown Logan, Utah.

The Ellen Eccles Theatre is an entertainment venue located in Logan, Utah. The theatre, which seats approximately 1100, is used for concerts, community theatre, ballet performances, and film showings. It has also become a stop for many national touring acts each year. It also hosts performances by the Utah Festival Opera Company during summers and year-round performances by the Cache Valley Civic Ballet, Music Theatre West, Valley Dance Ensemble, Cache Theatre Company, and Utah State University performing groups.

== History ==
The theatre was built in 1923. Then known as the Capitol Theatre, hosted vaudeville and opera performance. As vaudeville became less popular, the theatre became used primarily for community events and, increasingly, movies. By the 1980s, the Capitol had fallen into disrepair and become a run-down home for second-run movies.

In 1988, it seemed likely that the Capitol would be demolished and turned into a parking lot. Michael Ballam, an opera singer and professor at Utah State University, led the charge to save and restore the theatre. His efforts led to the city of Logan receiving the theatre as a gift from S. Eugene Needham, and a not-for-profit organization was formed to renovate and operate it, now known as the Cache Valley Center for the Arts. This restoration effort was delayed in 1990 when fire destroyed much of the theater's annex. However, work continued, and the house, christened the Ellen Eccles Theatre after the family member of one of the principal philanthropists, opened to a gala performance on January 8, 1993.
