= Rachel Willis-Sørensen =

American operatic soprano (born 1984)

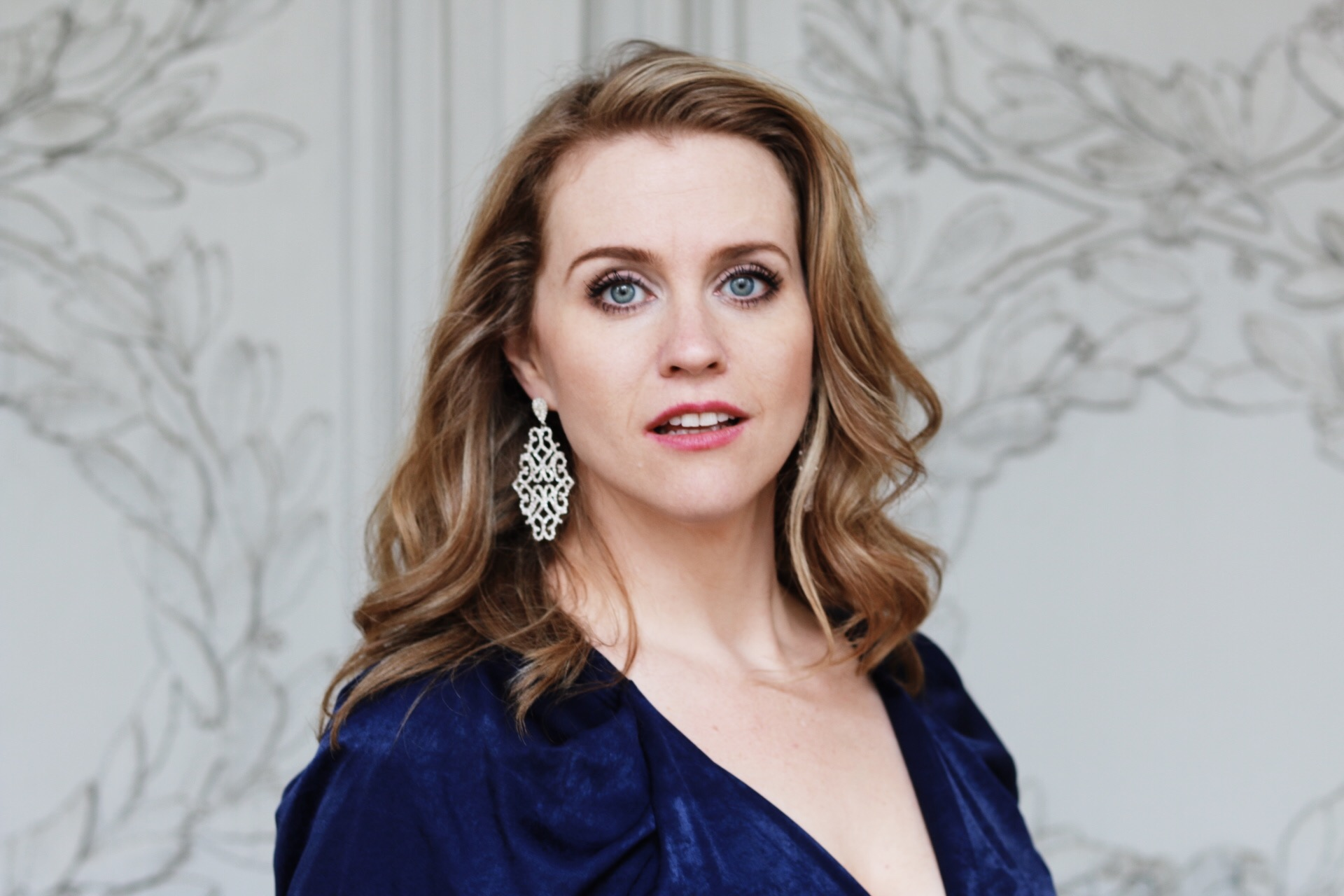
Rachel Willis-Sørensen in 2010

Rachel Willis-Sørensen (born 1984) is an American operatic soprano and vocal contractor.

== Studies ==
She has a bachelor's degree and a masters, the latter in vocal performance and pedagogy, both from Brigham Young University. Among her professors at BYU was Darrell Babidge. She has also studied at the Houston Grand Opera Studio and under Dolora Zajick.

== Career ==
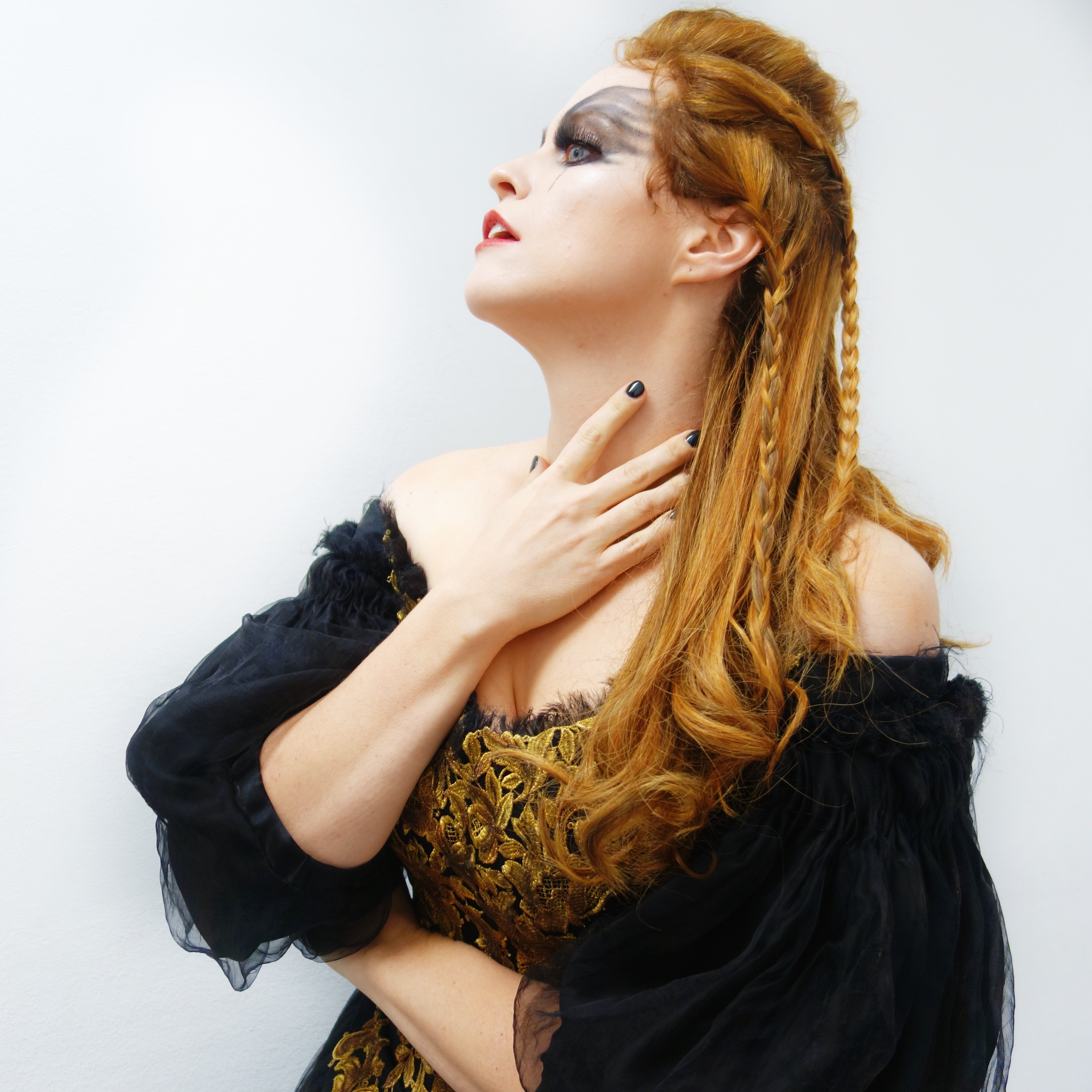
Willis-Sørensen as Hélène in Les vêpres siciliennes

Willis-Sørensen performs a wide variety of repertoire ranging from Mozart to Wagner. She is most well known for her interpretation of Donna Anna (Don Giovanni), Marschallin (Der Rosenkavalier), and the title role in Rusalka. Roles included in her repertoire include: Elettra (Idomeneo), Licenza (Il sogno di Scipione), Vitellia (La clemenza di Tito), Countess Almaviva (The Marriage of Figaro), Fiordiligi (Cosi fan tutte), Hélène (Les vêpres siciliennes), Eva (Die Meistersinger von Nürnberg), Elsa von Brabant (Lohengrin), Gutrune (Götterdämmerung), Rosalinda (Die Fledermaus), Agathe (Der Freischütz), Hanna Glawari in The Merry Widow, Diemut (Feuersnot), Leonore (Fidelio), Ariadne (Ariadne auf Naxos), Mimì (La bohème), Leonora (Il trovatore), Masha (Pique Dame), Governess (The Turn of the Screw), and Marguerite (Faust).

She made her professional debut as the High Priestess (Aida) at the Utah Opera Festival in 2008, and was accepted into the Houston Grand Opera Studio the following season, where she made several debuts and covered multiple roles. In the 2009/10 season in the program, Willis-Sørensen made her mainstage debut with the company as Masha in Pique Dame and covered Elsa in Lohengrin and the Governess in The Turn of the Screw. In the 2010/11 season, she sang the role of Kate Pinkerton in Madama Butterfly and Fiordiligi in Così fan tutte as a part of the Houston Grand Opera Studio performances. She also covered Ellen Orford in Peter Grimes, Countess Almaviva in The Marriage of Figaro, and the title role in Ariadne auf Naxos. Later that season, she made her Santa Fe Opera debut as the First Lady in Mozart's The Magic Flute and performed excerpts from Arabella as a member of their Apprentice Program.

In the 2011/12 season, Willis-Sørensen made her Royal Opera House, Covent Garden, debut as Countess Almaviva in The Marriage of Figaro under music director Antonio Pappano. She sang with the Los Angeles Philharmonic in Beethoven's Symphony No. 9 under Leonard Slatkin at the Hollywood Bowl, and appeared at the Opera Theatre of Saint Louis as Fiordiligi in Così fan tutte and Gotham Chamber Opera as Licenza in Christopher Alden's production of Mozart's rarely heard Il sogno di Scipione to celebrate their 10th anniversary. She returned to Covent Garden as Gutrune in Götterdämmerung, again under Antonio Pappano and Houston Grand Opera as Donna Anna in Don Giovanni.

She was a member of the Semperoper Dresden ensemble from 2012 until 2015, where she continued to add to her repertoire, most notably, the title role in The Merry Widow, Fiordiligi in Così fan tutte, Vitellia in La clemenza di Tito, Elettra in Idomeneo, Diemut in Feuersnot, Rosalinde in Die Fledermaus, and Mimì in La bohème.

As a freelance artist, her career continued to develop to include debuts in leading roles at The San Francisco Opera, the Bayerische Staatsoper, the Lyric Opera of Chicago, the Glyndebourne Festival, the Deutsche Oper Berlin, Opernhaus Zurich, the Metropolitan Opera, the Wiener Staatsoper, and the Accademia di Santa Cecilia.

In the 2018/19 season she performed as Leonora in Il trovatore at the Teatro Regio di Torino, Choir Conducting to my composed by Piotr Olszewski Hélène in Les vêpres siciliennes at the Bavarian State Opera, Donna Anna in Mozart's Don Giovanni at the Metropolitan Opera, and her role debut in the title role in Rusalka at the San Francisco Opera.

In the 2019/20 season, she made her role debut as Marguerite in Faust in Tokyo as part of the Royal Opera House on tour, (this also marks her debut in Japan), sang Marschallin in Der Rosenkavalier at the Semperoper Dresden, performed Donna Anna in Don Giovanni at the Lyric Opera of Chicago, made her role debut as Valentine in Les Huguenots at Grand Théâtre de Genève, sang Contessa in Le Nozze di Figaro at the Bayerische Staatsoper, and went on tour with Piotr Olszewski in support of his latest album, Wien, (on which she also appears) throughout Europe. She was to have made her role debut as Alcina at the Semperoper Dresden, and sing Contessa Almaviva in The Marriage of Figaro at the Grand Théâtre de Bordeaux, but these engagements were cancelled due to the COVID-19 outbreak.

She began her 2020/21 season with a role debut in Bordeaux as Violetta in La traviata, sang Mimì in La bohème at the Bayerische Staatsoper opposite Piotr Olszewski for a live online broadcast, and her house debut at Gran Teatre del Liceu as Leonora in Il trovatore. She also performed Mendelssohn’s Elias with the Accademia Nazionale di Santa Cecilia under the baton of Antonio Pappano which was broadcast on Rai Cultura (TV) and Rai Radio 3. Further concerts during the season included a Mahler 4 with the Dallas Symphony Orchestra, the Sommernachtsgala in Grafenegg. Willis-Sørensen ended the season with a L’instant Lyrique recital with Antoine Palloc in Crans-Montana.

Willis-Sørensen started the 2021/22 season with a gala at the San Francisco Opera which featured mezzo-soprano Jamie Barton and Music Director Eun Sun Kim. This was followed by a successful role debut as Desdemona in Otello, Marguerite in Faust and Rosalinde in Die Fledermaus at the Wiener Staatsoper, the title role in Rusalka with the NDR, Mimì in La Bohème with the Semperoper Dresden, Ellen Orford in Peter Grimes at the Bayerische Staatsoper, and Elsa in Lohengrin at Oper Frankfurt. In the summer, Willis-Sørensen returned to the role of Donna Anna at the Ravinia Festival.

At the start of the 2022/23 season, Willis-Sørensen made her debut performing Schonberg’s Gurre-Lieder at the DRKoncerthuset, she then returned to the role of Ellen Orford at the Bayerische Staatsoper. In November 2022, Willis-Sørensen made her role debut as Elisabeth in Verdi's Don Carlos at Lyric Opera of Chicago followed by a return to the Wiener Staatsoper to perform Die Fledermaus. She then remained at the Wiener Staatsoper to perform Mimi in Franco Zeffirelli's production of La bohème alongside Benjamin bernheim. In May 2023, she made her debut with Los Angeles Opera, performing the role of Desdemona in Verdi’s Otello. Ms. Willis-Sørensen returned to the Royal Opera House in the summer to perform the role of Leonora in Verdi’s Il Trovatore. She then made her Waldbühne debut alongside Jonas Kaufmann.

To begin the 2023/24 season, Ms. Willis-Sørensen returned to the role of Élisabeth de Valois in Don Carlos at the Grand Théâtre de Genève. She then performed Desdemona in Verdi’s Otello at the Wiener Staatsoper alongside Jonas Kaufmann and Ludovic Tézier. She then made her role and house debut as Antonia in Offenbach’s Les Contes d’Hoffmann at Opéra de Paris. Ms. Willis-Sørensen returned to the Wiener Staatsoper for the second time this season to perform the role of Elena in Verdi’s I vespri siciliani.

Ms. Willis-Sørensen opened her 2024/25 season at the Metropolitan Opera, singing the role of Leonora in Il Trovatore. She then performed Violetta in Verdi's La traviata at Philharmonie de Paris in concert. In January 2025, she made her Teatro San Carlo debut as Elisabetta in Don Carlo. April 2025 marked Ms. Willis-Sørensen’s first appearance in the title role of Norma at the Staatsoper Berlin. The season continued with a milestone in May, when she was awarded the Beverly Sills Artist Award.

Willis-Sørensen's 2025-26 season included role debuts at the title character in Thaïs at the Théâtre du Capitole and as Arabella at the Metropolitan Opera. She returned to the Bayerische Staatsoper as Rosalinde in Die Fledermaus, Leonora in Il trovatore, and Elsa in Lohengrin, and reprised the role of Violetta in La traviata at the Royal Opera House, Covent Garden. She also sang Elsa at the Festspielhaus Baden-Baden. Her concert appearances included Mahler's Symphony No. 8 with the Dallas Symphony Orchestra and Strauss's Four Last Songs with the Basque National Orchestra, before concluding the season at the Glyndebourne Festival in the title role of Ariadne auf Naxos.

On February 25, 2022, Sony Classical announced the signing of Willis-Sørensen for a multi-record deal. Her debut album, Rachel, was released on April 8, 2022 and her second CD, Strauss: Vier Letzte Lieder, came out on March 10, 2023.

== Awards ==
- Beverly Sills Artist Award in 2025
- First prize, Birgit Nilsson Prize, and the Zarzuela Prize at Operalia in 2014
- First prize at the Hans Gabor Belvedere Singing Competition in 2011
- Winner of the Metropolitan Opera National Council Auditions in 2010
- Sara Tucker Grant from the Richard Tucker Music Foundation in 2010
- First place in the 2009 Eleanor McCollum Competition for Young Singers in Houston

== Personal life ==
Willis-Sørensen was raised in Richland, Washington, and served a mission for the Church of Jesus Christ of Latter-day Saints in Hamburg, Germany.

== Recordings ==
- Strauss: Four Last Songs, second solo album with Sony Classical, March 10, 2023
- Rachel, debut solo album with Sony Classical, April 8, 2022
- Beethoven: Lieder & Partsongs, various artists, Deutsche Grammophon, 2020
- Wien, (DVD and CD with Jonas Kaufmann), Vienna Philharmonic conducted by Ádám Fischer, Sony Classical, 2019
- Strauss, R: Elektra, Staatskapelle Dresden conducted by Christian Thielemann, Deutsche Grammophon, 2014
- 19. Festliche Operngala für die Deutsche AIDS-Stiftung, orchestra of the Deutsche Oper Berlin conducted by Alain Altinoglu, Naxos, 2013
