= Michael Ballam =

American opera singer

- Born: August 21, 1951 (age 74); Logan, Utah, U.S.
- Education: Utah State University (B.M.); Indiana University (M.M., D.M.)
- Occupation: Opera singer (tenor)
- Spouse: Laurie Israelsen (m. 1972)
- Children: 6, including Vanessa Ballam
- Website: michaelballam.com

Michael Lynn Ballam (born August 21, 1951) is an American opera singer, educator, and arts administrator.

He is the founding general director of Utah Festival Opera and a professor of music at Utah State University. He has served on the faculty of the Music Academy of the West, where he also studied, and as a guest lecturer at Stanford, Yale, Catholic University, and Manhattan School of Music.

== Biography ==
=== Early life and education ===
Michael Ballam was born in Logan, Utah to Grant Lamb Ballam, a pharmacist, and his wife, Marianne Fullmer. He was raised in River Heights, a town adjacent to Logan. Ballam credits his great-grandfather, an immigrant from Denmark, as an inspiration for his pursuit of music and Latter-day Saint Christianity.

In 1956, he made his stage debut at Logan's Capitol Theatre, now the Ellen Eccles Theatre. He attended Sky View High School in the neighboring town of Smithfield, where he was cast as Wang Ta in Flower Drum Song and Billy Bigelow in Carousel, among others. After graduation, he attended the nearby Utah State University to pursue a degree in music education. He continued to sing in musical theater productions and expanded his repertoire to include opera, oratorio, and concert recital works.

At the age of 24, Ballam became the youngest recipient of a Doctor of Music with Distinction in the history of Indiana University. At Indiana, his ten roles performed included Andres in Wozzeck, the title role in The Tales of Hoffmann, and Rodolfo in La bohème. In 1976, he was the first student to perform the title role in Parsifal.

=== Professional work ===
Ballam has performed with many national houses, including the San Francisco, Metropolitan, Houston Grand, Washington National, San Diego, and Michigan Operas. In 1978, he premiered the role of Beelzebub in Penderecki's opera Paradise Lost at Chicago Lyric Opera. Ballam also premiered the role of Coyote in Mollicone's 1998 opera Coyote Tales.

Ballam's recital venues have included Kennedy Center, Carnegie Hall, Royal Albert Hall, Notre-Dame, and the Salt Lake Tabernacle. Ballam has also performed as a soloist at the White House and the Vatican.

As an actor, Ballam has starred in Clubhouse Detectives, as the Apostle Paul in the BYU Studios biopic The Chosen Vessel, as well as Lucifer in the 1990 temple film used in the endowment ordinance.

Ballam is also an oboist and pianist.

=== Illness ===
In 1987, Ballam was performing La Traviata in Caracas when he suddenly lost his ability to sing. He returned to his home in New York City and visited his ENT. After testing, Ballam was informed that the cause of his illness was a mystery and that he should prepare for a poor prognosis. Physicians in Denver and Houston provided similar perspectives. He returned to his family in Logan, Utah. It was later discovered that Ballam had suffered from a sinus infection that had progressed into his cranial cavity as a bone infection and subsequently into his lungs. Doctors operated on his skull and prescribed a regimen of antibiotics. Ballam recovered quickly.

=== Utah Festival Opera ===
When Ballam returned to Logan in 1987, he joined the music faculty of Utah State University. He was soon notified that the Capitol Theatre, where Ballam first performed as a child, was to be torn down to make room for a parking lot. Ballam ran a successful, multi-million dollar campaign to save, restore, and expand the building, which had fallen into disrepair. Upon completion, the theater had its name changed to the Ellen Eccles Theatre, honoring the community service and character of Ellen Stoddard Eccles (1867-1957) and her family. In subsequent years, Ballam has also led the restoration and renovation projects of several other historic cultural landmarks in Logan, Utah, including the Utah Theatre and the Dansante Building.

In 1992, Ballam founded Utah Festival Opera, which presented its first season in the summer of 1993. Since its inception, Ballam has stood as general director of the company, as well as one of its recurring performers. Most Utah Festival Opera productions are performed on the stages of the Ellen Eccles and Utah Theatres. The repertory company has continued to grow, now staging six shows and several concerts each summer.

For the 30th anniversary season in 2022, Ballam reprised his role as Cervantes/Don Quixote in Man of La Mancha.

== Additional contributions ==
"[Michael Ballam's] more than an entertainer.
He's got a heart of gold. He does it quietly.
He doesn't make a show of it.
He believes in music and goodness."

—Thomas S. Monson, former president of the LDS Church

Ballam has authored over forty publications and recordings in international distribution, and produced/performed a weekly radio program on Utah Public Radio. He is frequently asked to hold lectures worldwide on the creative arts, more specifically music, and their interaction with the functions of the mind, their use in enhancing education, and as sources of therapy and motivation.

Ballam currently serves on the Board of Directors of several professional arts organizations.

== Achievements ==
- 1996: 100 Top Achievers in the State of Utah, awarded by Prime Minister Margaret Thatcher
- 2003: Artist Extraordinaire, appointed by Governor Olene Walker
- 2007: Excellence in Community Teaching Award, given by the Daughters of the American Revolution
- 2010: Gardner Award, given by the Utah Academy of Science, Arts & Letters, for “Significant Contributions in the Humanities to the State of Utah”
- Honorary Life Membership to the Utah Congress of Parents and Teachers

== Faith ==
Ballam is a member of the Church of Jesus Christ of Latter-day Saints. He has written and lectured on the relationship between music and the doctrines of the Church. The Church created the position of "musical missionary-at-large" specifically for him.

In 1999, Ballam sang "Panis Angelicus" by Cesar Franck at the funeral of his friend and supporter, influential LDS author and historian Leonard J. Arrington. Ballam also sang for the 90th birthday celebration of LDS president Gordon B. Hinckley.

== Family ==
Ballam's grandfather, Oral Ballam, was a veteran in World War II. When he returned to the United States, he was educated at Utah State University, and received an Ed. D. from UCLA. After graduation, he was granted a Ford Foundation Fellowship, which allowed him further study at Stanford and Columbia Universities. He was a public school administrator in Cache Valley before becoming a professor at USU in 1963. In 1969, he was appointed Dean of the College of Education, retiring in 1992.

Ballam is also descended from J. W. Summerhays, the patriarch of a musical dynasty in the Utah region and a singer himself. Summerhays emigrated from Europe as an LDS convert in 1866.

Michael's daughter, Vanessa, is a performer, stage director, and former Miss Utah. She is also a theatre professor at Idaho State University and education director for Utah Festival Opera. Michael's son, Benjamin, whose mobility is affected by spina bifida, has appeared in some Utah Festival productions. Michael Ballam has four other children with his wife, Laurie. He currently resides in Logan, Utah.
