= Lviv National Philharmonic =

Philharmonic in Lviv, Ukraine

Coordinates: 49°50′16″N 24°01′50″E

Lviv National Philharmonic named after Myroslav Skoryk
- Львівська національна філармонія імені Мирослава Скорика
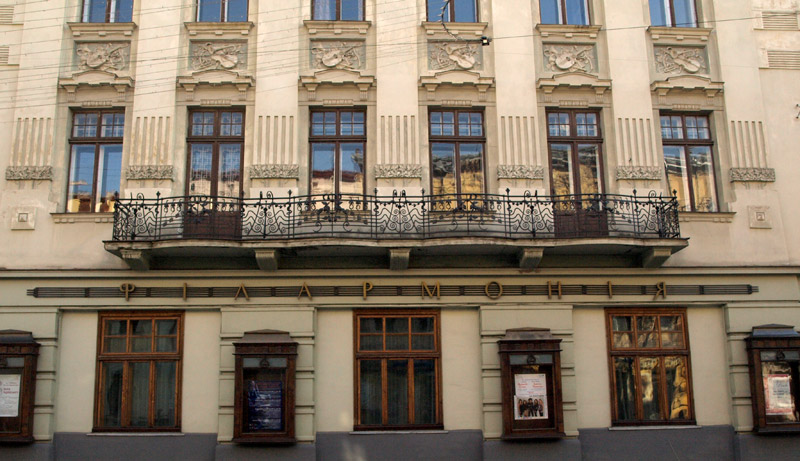
- Formation: 1907
- Type: philharmonic
- Location: Lviv, Ukraine
- Website: Lviv National Philharmonic

Myroslav Skoryk Lviv National Philharmonic is a philharmonic located in Lviv, Ukraine. The philharmonic received the status of a national one in 2017.

== History ==
The Lviv Philharmonic began its work in 1902 on the premises of the former Scarbeck Theater (now the Maria Zankovetska National Academic Ukrainian Drama Theater). In 1933, Adam Soltys founded the Academic Symphony Orchestra of the Lviv Philharmonic. In 1939, the Philharmonic was granted state status. Since 1944, the philharmonic's symphony orchestra has been performing regularly.

The Philharmonic is home to the Academic Symphony Orchestra, the Lviv Virtuosos Academic Chamber Orchestra, High Castle Academic Instrumental Ensemble, the bandura quartet "Lvivianky", and the ensemble "19th Class".

On August 18, 2017, the Verkhovna Rada approved the draft Decree of the President of Ukraine "On Granting the Lviv Regional Philharmonic the Status of a National Institution."

On September 29, 2020, the Lviv Regional Council named the Philharmonic after Myroslav Skoryk.

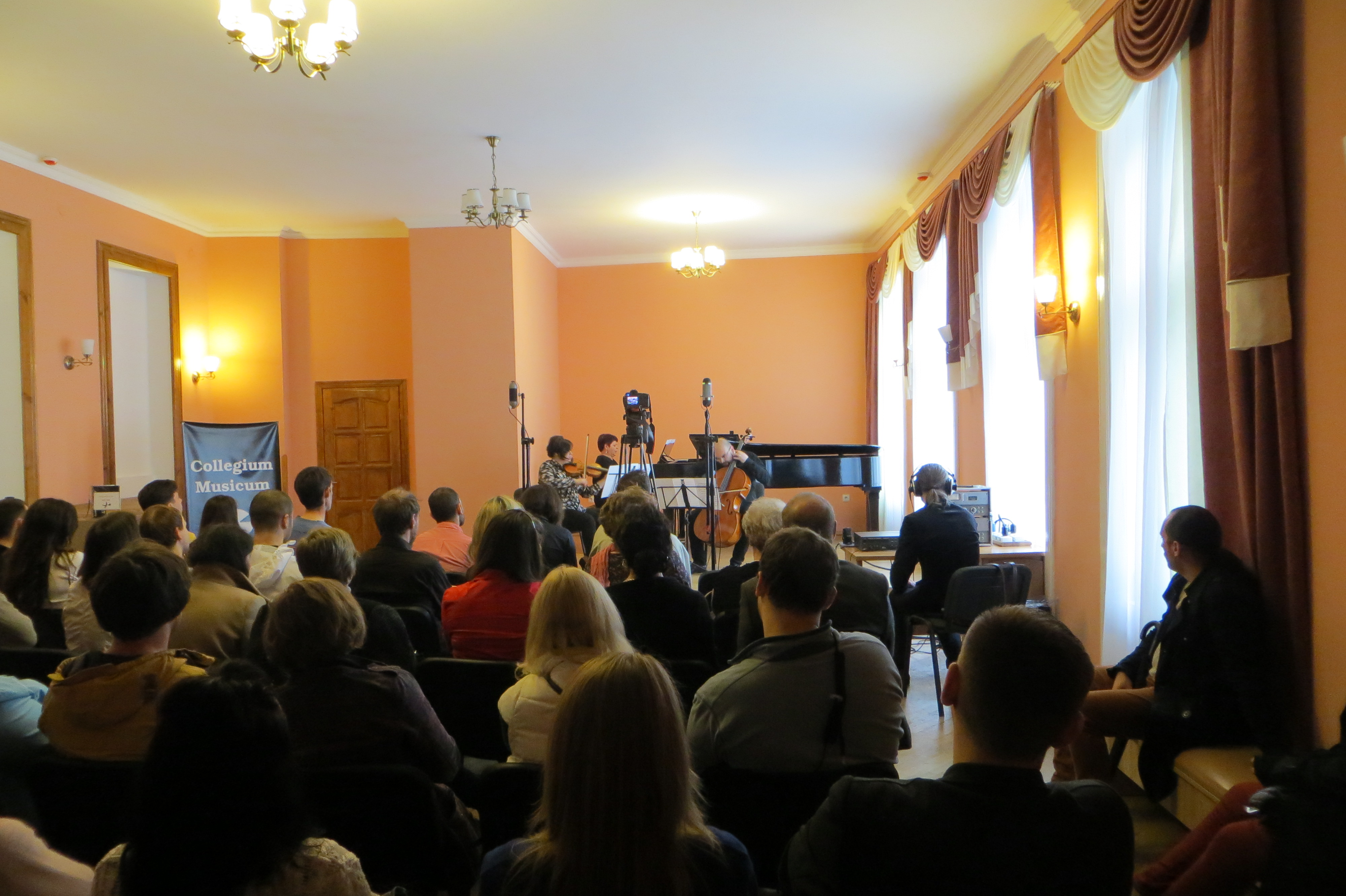
Chamber scene

== Building ==
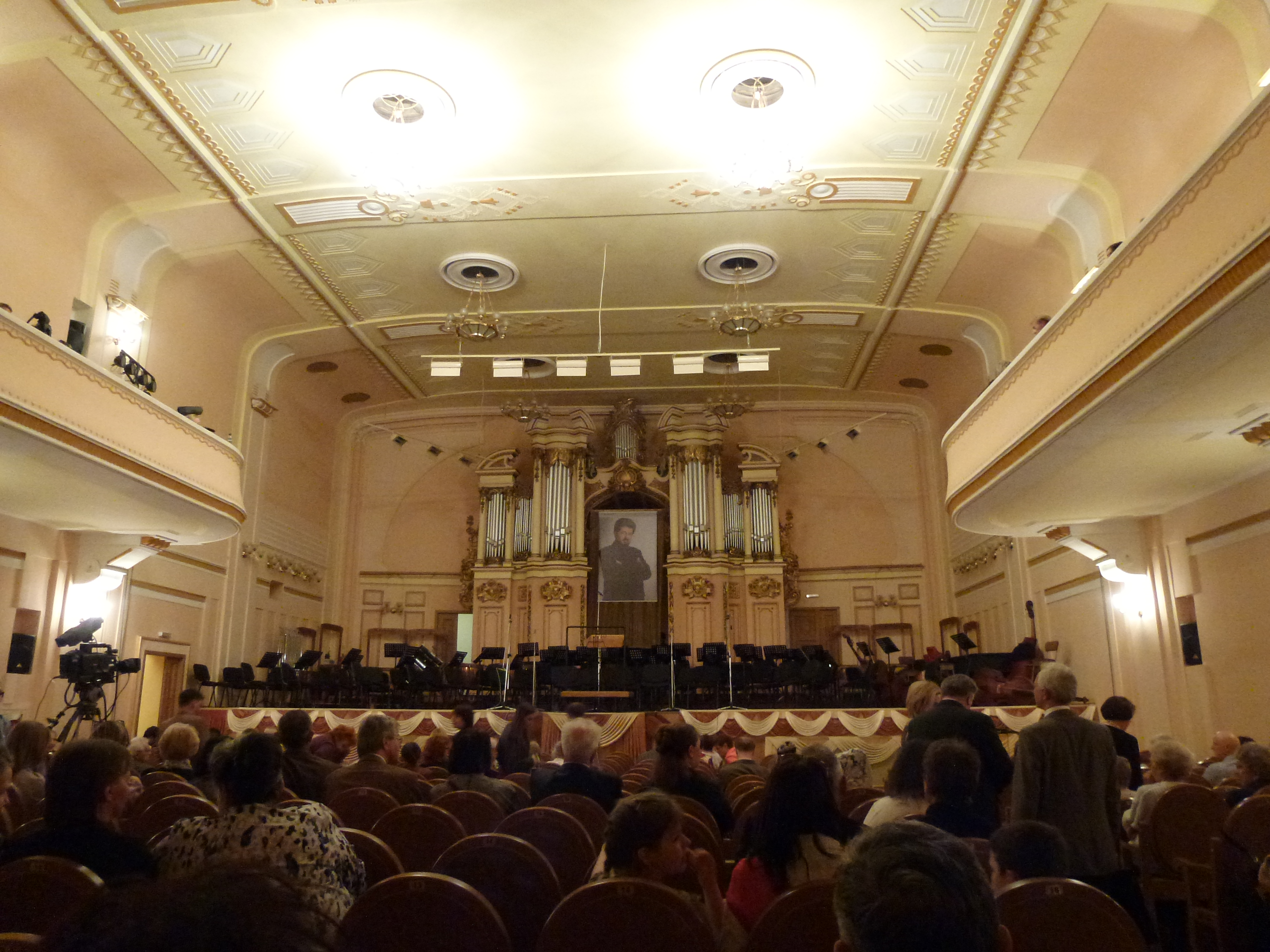
Big Concert Hall (Stanislav Ludkevich Concert Hall)

In 1905, architect Władysław Halytskyi, commissioned by the Halychyna Musical Society, designed the society's building in the Neo-Baroque style. It was planned to house a conservatory and a concert hall, and part of the building was to be used as a revenue house. Construction began in 1905, but the following year it was continued in the Vienna Secession style by architect Władysław Sadłowski. The sculptural decoration of the building's facades, including reliefs depicting musical instruments and two metal sculptures of swans in the attic, was made by sculptor Piotr Witalis Harasimowicz, and the interior of the two-tiered concert hall was decorated with busts of composers by sculptor Luna Drexlerówna. The project of the building was exhibited in 1910 at an exhibition of Polish architects in Lviv.

In the postwar period, the building housed the concert hall of the Lysenko Conservatory and since the 1940s it has been home to the Lviv Regional Philharmonic. The Philharmonic building is listed in the Register of Architectural Monuments of Local Significance under protection number 374-m.

== Performances ==
=== Classical music ===
Solomiya Krushelnytska, Oleksandr Myshuga, Richard Strauss, Gustav Mahler, Bela Bartok, Anton Rubinstein, Ferruccio Busoni, Marguerite Long, Wanda Landowska, Pablo Casals, Jacob Milstein, Leopold Godowski, Sviatoslav Richter, Rudolf Kerer, Leonid Kogan, David Oistrakh, Liana Isakadze, Bella Rudenko, Vira Hornostaieva, Natalia Gutman, and Yuri Bashmet have performed on the stage of the Lviv Philharmonic. Dmitri Shostakovich, Borys Liatoshynsky, Aram Khachaturian, Alfred Schnittke, Arvo Pärt, Krzysztof Penderecki, Pawel Albinsky, Michael Striharz, Rafael Serrallet, Valentyn Silvestrov, Myroslav Skoryk, and Yevhen Stankovych gave recitals at the Philharmonic.

== Competitions and festivals ==
Since 1981, the Philharmonic has been holding the music festival "Virtuosos of the Country", which in 1990 received international status and the name "Virtuosos".

- April 1–3, 2011 – Kvitka Tsysyk International Ukrainian Romance Competition was held.
- June 29 – July 1, 2017 – "W LIVE. Quiet Days of Love and Music of Peace" the first in Ukraine open International Music Marathon in memory of opera singer, Hero of Ukraine, Vasyl Slipak.
- On December 15–20, 2017 – Vasyl Slipak International Competition of Young Vocalists. Lviv Regional Philharmonic is a co-founder and organizer of the competition.

== See also ==
- Academic Symphony Orchestra of the Lviv Philharmonic

== Sources ==
- Bevz, M., Biryulov, Y., Bohdanova, Y., Didyk, V., Ivanochko, U., Klymenyuk, T., et al. (2008). "Архітектура Львова: Час і стилі. XIII—XXI ст." Lviv: Center of Europe. ISBN 9789667022778
- Herbylskyi, H., et al. (1949). "Львов: справочник" Lviv: Vilna Ukraina.
- Shevchuk, O. (2011). "Львівська обласна філармонія". In Skrypnyk, H. (ed.). Ukrainian Musical Encyclopedia (in Ukrainian). Vol. 3. Kyiv: Rylsky Institute of Art Studies, Folklore and Ethnology. pp. 212–214. ISBN 966-02-4099-6.
