= Vasyl Slipak =

Ukrainian opera singer (1974–2016)

- Василь Ярославович Сліпак
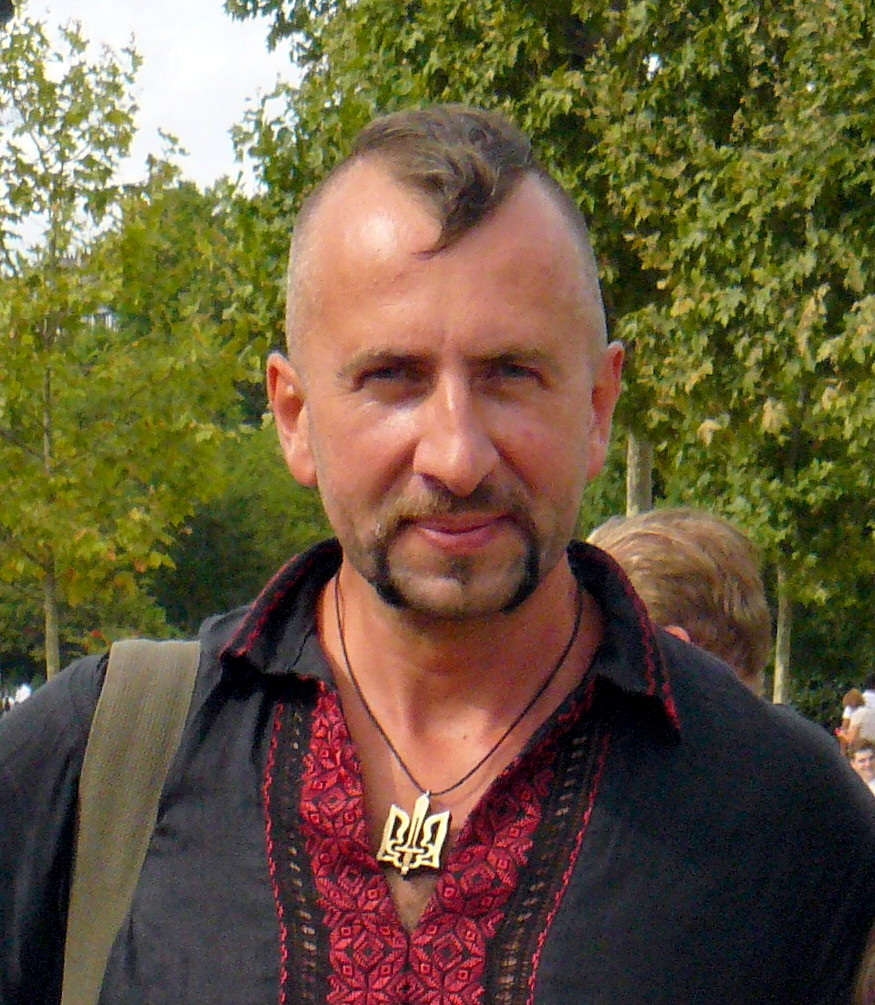
- Slipak on Independence Day of Ukraine, 2014 in Paris
- Born: 20 December 1974; Lviv, Ukrainian SSR, Soviet Union
- Died: 29 June 2016 (aged 41); Luhanske, Donetsk Oblast, Ukraine
- Occupation: Opera singer
- Years active: 1994–2016
- Awards: Order of the Gold Star (posthumously)
- Website: www.wassylslipak.com

Vasyl Yaroslavovych Slipak (Ukrainian: Василь Ярославович Сліпак; 20 December 1974 – 29 June 2016) was a Ukrainian baritone opera singer. From 1994 he frequently performed in France at such venues as Paris Opera and Opéra Bastille. For his opera performance, Slipak received several awards, including "Best Male Performance" for the Toreador Song. A volunteer in the Ukrainian army, Slipak was killed during the war in Donbas by a Russian sniper near the village of Luhanske, in Bakhmut region. He was posthumously awarded the title of Hero of Ukraine for his work as a volunteer soldier.

== Early life ==
Vasyl was born in the city of Lviv on 20 December 1974. He started singing early. Like any child, he was present at all home holiday parties, which did not do without songs. He fell in love with these melodies, they stuck in his soul. At the age of six, at a village wedding, he sang the song by the Marenich trio "Tysha navkrugy" (lyrics and music by Oleksandr Bogachuk).

No one in the family was professionally connected with music. Mother Nadiya Vasylivna worked in a design office, father Yaroslav Volodymyrovych was a specialist in the production unit, and older brother Orest Yaroslavovych, a doctor by education. But the grandfather, after whom the parents named their son, had a unique voice. Therefore, it is believed that Vasyl's talent comes from him. From 1981 to 1991, he studied at Lviv School No. 46.

== Career ==
=== Choir Chapel "Dudaryk" ===
Everything in his life was connected with singing. In 1983, when he was 9 years old, his older brother Orest took him to the Lviv Choir Chapel "Dudaryk", where Vasyl sang until 1994. It was Mykola Katsal, the head of the chapel, who became the first iconic figure in the work of Vasyl Slipak.

The worldview and taste of the future opera singer was shaped by the repertoire works of Ukrainian composers, which represent the "golden age" of the development of the a capella choral concert genre of the second half of the seventeenth - the first half of the eighteenth century, namely: concerts by Dmytro Bortnyansky, Artem Vedel, Maksym Berezovsky; Christmas carols and Christmas carols arranged by Ukrainian composers — Mykola Lysenko, Mykola Leontovych, Kyril Stetsenko, Oleksandr Koshyts. "Dudaryk" also performed "Stabat Mater" by J. Pergolesi, "Carmina Burana" by K. Orff, Requiem by V. A. Mozart, IX Symphony by L. V. Beethoven, III Symphony Kaddish ("Kaddish") by L. Bernstein and many oratorios.

"Dudaryk" recorded several records, CDs, and CDs, as well as dozens of concert programs on radio and television. In 1989 the team was awarded the Shevchenko Prize.

Vasyl Slipak's formation as an opera singer took place surrounded by professionals, which is an important component of the professional training system, contributing to the formation of the manner of performance and personality development.

In particular, on 19 May 1985, on the occasion of the 300th anniversary of the birth of J. S. Bach, a joint concert "Dudaryk" was held at the Lviv Regional Philharmonic with Lyudmila Bozhko (soprano), People's Artist of Ukraine, Natalya Svoboda (mezzo-soprano), Honored Artist of Ukraine, Volodymyr Ignatenko (tenor), Honored Artist of Ukraine.

On 1 and 2 February 1986 joint concerts of "Dudaryk" with Nina Matvienko, People's Artist of Ukraine, V. Kovalska, and V. Pivnov, laureates of republican competitions.

On 13 November 1987, "Dudaryk" together with Nina Matvienko made a stock recording of Ukrainian folk lullabies at the Ukrainian Radio Sound Recording House.

30 December 1988, 5 January 1989, at the Lviv Opera and Ballet Theater named after I. Franko (now the Lviv National Academic Theater of Opera and Ballet named after Solomiya Krushelnytska) and on 14 January 1989, in the Column Hall of the Kyiv State Philharmonic, choir chapel concerts were held together with Nina Matvienko and the trio "Golden Keys".

In June–July 1990, the band with soloist V.Slipak went on a tour of the cities of the USA — Detroit, Rochester (New York), Cleveland, Pittsburgh, Philadelphia, Kergonkson (performance in the center of Soyuzivka), Chicago, Minneapolis, and also Canada.

On 18 June 1990, in Carnegie Hall (New York, USA) together with the famous soloist of the Metropolitan Opera bass Pavel Plishka, they performed "The Boundless Field" based on a poem by Ivan Franko, music by Mykola Lysenko, the prayer "Lord of Heaven and land" from Semen Hulak-Artemovsky's opera "Zaporozhets za Danube", a cantata about the Pochaiv Mother of God, "You hear, my brother" based on a poem by Bohdan Lepky, music by Levko Lepky, arrangement by Kyryll Stetsenko, "For you, Ukraine" by Stanislav Ludkevich.

"Dudaryk" took part in the International Choral Festival (2–8 July) in Powell River (Canada, British Columbia) and on 9 July 1990 in the International Festival in Vancouver (Canada Place).

As part of the VI World Youth Day on 15 August 1991, in Częstochowa (Poland), a concert of the "Dudaryk" chapel took place, attended by Pope John Paul II.

In 1992, "Dudaryk" took part in the 2nd International Sacred Music Festival "Gaude Mater", which took place from 1 to 6 May in Częstochowa (Poland), performed "Canto about the Pochaiv Mother of God" by Mykola Leontovych, carol "Oh there on the river, there on the Jordan", arranged by Kyril Stetsenko, Cherub Song, A minor, by Artem Vedel, "Hallelujah" by Mykhailo Verbytskyi.

Vasyl Slipak, as part of the choir, performed in the most prestigious concert halls of Ukraine and the world: the National Opera of Ukraine named after Taras Shevchenko, the National Philharmonic of Ukraine, the National Palace of Arts Ukraine, Carnegie Hall (New York, USA, 1990), Notre Dame Cathedral (France ), West Edmonton Mall (Edmonton, Canada), Vancouver Air Place (Canada, 1990), Warsaw Philharmonic (Poland, 1991, 1992, 1994), Dome Cathedral (Latvia, Riga), as well as in Lithuania, Estonia (1987, 1991), Belarus, Russia, Georgia, Moldova, Hungary, Slovakia (1993, 1994), Austria (1993), Italy, the Vatican, Belgium, the Netherlands, Switzerland (1993).

=== Student years ===
Despite his rare voice (countertenor), he did not immediately enter the Lviv Higher State Music Institute named after M. V. Lysenko (now the Mykola Lysenko Lviv National Academy of Music). But then he performed a lot, and toured. Met many conductors and composers — Myroslav Skoryk, Volodymyr Sirenko, Igor Andrievskyi, Artur Mykytka.

Only in 1992, did he become a student in the solo singing class of People's Artist of Ukraine (1979), laureate of the Taras Shevchenko National Prize of Ukraine (1976), Professor Baiko Maria Yakivna, under whose guidance he mastered a significant repertoire of works by Ukrainian and Western European composers. Performed the parts of Alkid from the opera of the same name by Dmytro Bortnyansky and Lebed in "Carmine Buran" by Karl Orff. He took an active part in student concerts, and already then distinguished himself as a talented and promising performer. While studying at the institute (1992-1996), he continued his concert activities. He performed the works of G. Caccini, A. Falconieri, A. Scarlatti, A. Stefani, A. Vivaldi, A. Tenaglia, L. Vinci, A. Stradella, A. Lotti, V. A. Mozart, M. Berezovsky, and other composers. He sang in the hall of the Solomiya Krushelnytska Memorial Music Museum.

He was the first performer of Oleksandr Kozarenko's chamber cantata for countertenor and the instrumental ensemble "Pierro mertvpetlyuye", which premiered in 1994 in Lviv. Vasyl Slipak announced himself as a contemporary music performer.

In 1994, the older brother, a postgraduate student at the medical institute, while attending a congress of cardiologists in France, met Fr. Pavel Kogut, who directed him to the editorial office of "Ukrainian Word" in Paris, where he met the director of the weekly Yaroslav Musyanovych, doctor of medicine. The professor, receiving Orest in his own home, talked about culture and Parisian life, introduced him to the composer of Ukrainian origin Maryan Kuzan, and strongly recommended to leave the cassette with Vasyl's recording to the composer. Within a month, Vasyl Slipak received an invitation from the organizing committee of one of the largest music festivals in Clermont-Ferrand (France).

Within a three-month period, Vasyl prepared a concert programme that included The Passion according to St Matthew and The Passion according to St John by Johann Sebastian Bach, as well as cantatas by George Frideric Handel. He also performed German and French songs and Italian arias in their original languages.

At the 10th International Oratorio and Song Contest “Grand Prix France Telecom” (1994) in Clermont-Ferrand, France, he was the only participant to perform songs from his native repertoire, arranged by Levko Revutskyi and Mykola Lysenko. He was awarded the Grand Prix and the Audience Prize.

His performance at the competition, together with subsequent auditions with specialists from the Paris Conservatoire, marked an important stage in his early career and contributed to discussions regarding his vocal range, including his performance as both a countertenor and a baritone.

Vasyl Slipak was given the right to present his program in Paris. In 1994, the young baritone gave a solo concert at the Vichy Opera (France) — a concert of works of Ukrainian folk music.

As part of the Fifth International Ukrainian Music Festival "Kyiv Music Fest'94", on 3 October 1994, in the hall of the House of Scientists of the National Academy of Sciences of Ukraine, accompanied by the chamber orchestra "ARCHI" (conductor - Ihor Andriyevsky), O. Kozarenko's chamber cantata "Pierro's Dead Loop" was performed. The audience called V.Slipak for an encore, which was the first time at a concert of modern chamber music.

On 15 April 1995, in Odesa at the forty-eight-hour musical marathon of the First International Festival of Contemporary Art "Two Days and Two Nights of New Music" in the presence of the president of the festival, Professor Bernhard Wolff, one of the recognized leaders of "new music", vice-rector of the Higher School of music in Freiburg (Germany), performed O. Kozarenko's cantata "Pierro is dying." Success was repeated, as in Lviv. The cantata was played twice.

In April 1995, he took part in the television program "Classic Premier", the filming took place in the National Palace of Arts "Ukraine". He performed Cherubino's arioso from Wolfgang Amadeus Mozart's opera "The Marriage of Figaro" accompanied by the honored academic symphony orchestra of the National Radio Company of Ukraine, conducted by Volodymyr Sirenko.

In 1995, he participated in the V International Festival of Concert Art in Žilina (Slovakia), where he performed a program of baroque arias accompanied by the harpsichord. The performance concert lasted an hour, during which eleven works were performed.

On 16 May 1995, a solo concert was held in Kyiv within the framework of the Fourth International Youth Music Forum, in the first part of which modern music was performed, and in the second part - baroque, in particular, Maryna Denysenko's work "Three Fragments from an Ancient Suite" (1991) to words Joachim du Belle for chamber ensemble and countertenor, which was written at Vasyl Slipak's suggestion. He became its first executor. The piece is dedicated to Vasyl Slipak, and it was in his performance (second edition, 1994) together with the chamber orchestra "Ukrainian Heritage" (artistic director and conductor - O. Andreev) that the composition was performed in a chamber concert.

On 19 May 1995, listeners had the opportunity to appreciate the giftedness and weight of assessments of the unique voice of Vasyl Slipak at the grand opening of the International Festival of Musical Art "Virtuosos", which took place in the Lviv Regional Philharmonic. The singer, together with the "Dudaryk" chapel and Bohdana Khidchenko (soprano), performed in K. Orff's "Carmina Buran", in which he performed two parts at once - the roasted swan (countertenor) and the traveling monk (baritone).

On 23 June 1995, in a concert held at the Lviv Hall of Organ and Chamber Music, he performed an excerpt from Giulio Caccini's opera.

At the invitation of Michael Stricharz, a famous European violinist, teacher, philanthropist, in August 1995, together with the chamber orchestra "Akademiya" (Lviv), conducted by Miroslav Skoryk, he took part in the 45th International Youth Music Festival "Das Treffen" (Bayreuth, Germany ), performed the part from K. Orff's opera "Bernauerin". At the same time, M. Striharzh organized a meeting between Vasyl Slipak and conductor Daniel Barenboim.

In the autumn of 1995, at the final concert of the International Festival of Contemporary Music "Contrasts", held in the Lviv Regional Philharmonic Hall, the orchestral piece "Aria Passione" by Ihor Shcherbakov was played, in which the aria "O, blüte nur, du, liebest Herz" from "Passions for Matthew" by J. S. Bach. By design, this single vocal phrase for the entire orchestral work was to be sung at the climax by the soprano, who had to sit somewhere in the back of the orchestra, not far from the grand piano. It turned out that Olga Pasichnyk was supposed to sing, but for some reason, she did not come, and Vasyl replaced her. The effect was extraordinary when he suddenly rose above the orchestra and performed his phrase with incredible drama.

In the Lviv Hall of Organ and Chamber Music on 8 and 10 December 1995 the choir (conductor — Yaroslav Hnatovskyi) and the orchestra of the Lysenko Higher Music Institute "Perpetuum Mobile" (musical director and conductor — Georgy Pavliy) performed the opera "Dido and Aeneas" Henry Purcell. Among the soloists was a guest from Great Britain, George Newton Fitzgerald, in the role of Aeneas.

It was an exclusive event for Ukraine — the first concert performance (in the original language in an authentic manner) in Ukraine of the opera "Dido and Aeneas" by the English baroque composer. Vasyl Slipak performed not one, but three arias at once: Witcher (countertenor), Spirit of Mercury (baritone), and Yunga (tenor).

The singer, in addition to his native language, was fluent in many foreign languages: Italian, French, English, German, Spanish, Polish, and Russian, which created the possibility of access to information, a sense of freedom in communication with people, the possibility of career growth - expressing oneself as part of the world.

In the Clermont-Ferrand Opera, the comic opera "The Game of Love and Chance" by Pierre Carle de Chamblein Mariveau was performed for the first time in France. Vasyl Slipak played the main male role of the young treasurer Durante, performing alongside famous French singers Catherine Ashner, Robert Courtacillo, and Pierre Thoma. The premiere took place on 31 December 1995, and 1 January 1996, causing great interest in the French. Vasyl Slipak's vocal skills were highly appreciated by the audience.

A few days after the triumph, he gave a solo concert at the opera, in which he performed Ukrainian classics - arias from the operas of D. Bortnyansky and M. Berezovsky, romances and solos by D. Sichynskyi, Ya. Lopatynskyi, M. Lysenko, S. Lyudkevich, M. Wheels As an encore, he performed Eric Satie's original composition "Dafeneillo", which combines the sounds of baritone and countertenor. The accompanist was the famous Parisian pianist Bernard Leroy. The program of this concert was recorded on CD the next day.

He performed V. A. Mozart's Requiem at the Clermont-Ferrand Opera, Paris and Saint-Louis (France) accompanied by an orchestra conducted by Jean-Pierre Lo Ri.

On 20 April 1996, at the invitation of UNESCO, together with the "Dudaryk" Choir Chapel, he participated in the dedication event of the 10th anniversary of the accident at the Chornobyl Nuclear Power Plant - in the Cathedral of Notre-Dame de Paris, he sang in the requiem concert in the presence of the heads diplomatic missions, diplomatic staff of all foreign embassies and missions accredited in France.

In 1996, he participated in the 6th International Sacred Music Festival "Gaude Mater", which took place from 1 to 6 May in Częstochowa (Poland). Accompanied by the chamber orchestra of the Lviv Regional Philharmonic "Virtuosi of Lviv", conducted by Serhiy Burko, he performed Cantata 53 (Schlage doch, sichte Stunde, BWV 53) by J. S. Bach, Stabat Mater by Antonio Vivaldi.

Vasyl Slipak was invited to participate in the Seventh International Festival of Musical Art "Virtuosos", which took place from 17 to 26 May 1996 at the Lviv Philharmonic.

As part of the International Music Festival of Contemporary Music "Days of Music of Krakow Composers", on 31 May 1996, together with Olga Pasichnyk (soprano), Valery Buimister (baritone), he participated in a concert in Sukenice, the concert hall of the National Museum of Polish Art of the 19th Century (Krakow, Poland). Accompanied by the chamber orchestra "Virtuosi of Lviv" (conductor Roman Revakovich) he performed Oleksandr Kozarenko's chamber cantata "Pierto mertupetlyuye".

In April 1997, he participated in the sixth International Theater Festival-Laboratory "Artistic Berezilla. Music".

In October 1997, at the 1st Festival "Golden Roofed Kyiv" in the hall of the National Philharmonic of Ukraine the choir of the Institute of Arts of the National Pedagogical Institute named after M. P. Drahomanov (director — Lyudmila Bayda) performed Viktor Stepurk's composition — a theatrical mystery-diptych " Supramental dream", consisting of 2 parts: "Pavana (In moon tones)" and "Pavana (In snowy fields)" for countertenor, baritone, and women. choir On the symbolic poems of Oleksa Trokhymenko (poetry pseudonym V. Stepurka). Its first part "Pavana in Moon Tones" is performed by soloists Vasyl Slipak and Mykola Hobdych. The performance was accompanied by a special choreographic performance.

Vasyl Slipak, still very young, in 1997, successfully passed the competitive test to join the Paris National Opera. His voice enabled him to start a solo career in France and Europe.

In 2008, Vasyl Slipak started a big concert tour of Europe

=== Public activity ===
In the early 1990s, immediately after the declaration of independence, Vasyl Slipak and his brother Orest, in solidarity with people with special needs, were among the first to join the "Faith and Light" movement, the "Rainbow" community, which was formed at the church of St. Volodymyr and Olga in Lviv.

In the summer of 1993 and 1994, together with a team from the International Federation of Larch from Canada (led by the famous theologian and preacher Henry Nouen), the brothers helped organize spiritual retreats for young people. For some time, Vasyl sang in the choir of the church of St. Volodymyr and Olga, whose parishioner he was. Henry Nouen repeatedly mentions Vasyl in his "Ukrainian Diaries".

Together with his brother Orest, he organized concerts in juvenile colonies to morally support those who were behind bars.

In 2004, he was an active participant in the Orange Revolution.

The singer lived in Paris for 19 years. During this time, he was offered French citizenship twice, and twice he refused, wanting to be a citizen of Ukraine.

==== During the Revolution of Dignity ====
During the Revolution of Dignity, he had a contract at the Opera — he could not come to Kyiv. But with the beginning of Euromaidan, he led the volunteer movement — he coordinated public actions in France aimed at supporting Ukraine. The singer became an active participant in everything that happened in the diaspora: he supported the Paris Euromaidan, which has been ongoing since 24 November 2013. On 24 November, an action in support of the Euromaidan in Ukraine was held in Paris on the Trocadero Square opposite the Eiffel Tower. At the call of the Representative Committee of the Ukrainian Community of France from Paris and other French cities, about 300 people came to the rally under the flags of Ukraine and the EU. He led the volunteer movement and coordinated actions in support of Ukraine in France. He constantly sent broadcasts with humanitarian aid to the Maidan, collected money, and arranged charity concerts.

Vasyl Slipak organized regular public lectures for representatives of mass media, education, and politics, which helped to truthfully cover events in Ukraine.

On 12 January 2014, he held a solidarity rally in support of Euromaidan in Paris.

He participated in the campaign in support of the Russian TV channel "Rain" on 9 February 2014, in Paris.

On 16 February 2014, he organized and held the Artmaidan-manifestation, which was accompanied by performances by musicians, singers, artists, and actors supporting Ukrainian protesters.

He was among the activists who, on 19 February 2014, near the Ukrainian embassy, organized a commemoration of the people who were shot on 18 February 2014, on the street. Instytuska.

==== After the beginning of the Russian aggression ====
On 5 March 2014, he held another public demonstration against Russia's aggression in Paris. On the initiative of the activists of the Paris Euromaidan Association, Ukrainians picketed the Ministry of Foreign Affairs of France with appeals to diplomats to encourage the world community to involve all possible diplomatic, economic, informational, and other means to stop Russia's aggressive interference in the internal affairs of Ukraine.

On 5 June 2014, near the building of the National Assembly of France, Ukrainian, Syrian, and Russian activists held a protest against Putin's visit to Paris. The organizers from the Ukrainian side were the participants of the Paris "Euromaidan", which became the 41st in the French capital. The rally was led by Vasyl Slipak.

On the occasion of the Independence Day of Ukraine, on 24 August 2014, he organized and held in Paris the action "Smileys for Ukraine" - a photo session of participants in Ukrainian national clothes.

On 4 September 2014, in Paris, on Trocadero Square, near the Chaillot Palace, he participated in a protest against the sale of Mistrals to Russia.

In October 2015, the International Initiative Group of the Ukrainian Diaspora, which included Vasyl Slipak, Iryna von Burg, and Volodymyr Kogutyak, organized and held the anti-war campaign Stop Putin's War In Ukraine.

He was among the activists of the "Euromaidan Bordeaux" initiative ("Collectif Euromaidan Bordeaux"), who created a corresponding petition in December 2015 and succeeded in canceling the showing of the Russian film "Crimea. The Way to the Motherland", which tells about the annexation of the peninsula.

On 28 February 2016, he took part in a rally in Paris as a sign of protest against Russian aggression in Ukraine and on the occasion of the second anniversary of the annexation of Crimea by the Russian Federation.

On 8 March 2016, about 30 Ukrainian, Russian, and French activists demanded an embargo on Russian oil, as well as the blocking of the SWIFT system, outside the French Ministry of Foreign Affairs.

On 8 June 2016, he organized a protest by Ukrainians in Paris in front of the French Senate and the next day in front of the National Assembly during a discussion on the need to lift sanctions against Russia.

On 10 June 2016, he organized the International March "Stop Putin War in Ukraine!", in which about 30 countries participated. The action had a great impact on the decision to extend European Union sanctions against the Russian Federation.

==== "Opera Performers for Children" association ====
To explain to the French audience in the language of art the situation in Ukraine and to raise enough money to help the children of war victims to shelter, feed, and offer them as much support as possible on 12 July 2014, Vasyl Slipak together with colleagues, famous European opera singers, and namely: Gosha Kovalinska (mezzo-soprano), Guillaume Dussault (bass), Thierry de Marsley (tenor) created the Foundation "Opera Performers for Children", a humanitarian non-profit organization.

Per the legislation of the French Republic, on 10 October 2014, the name was changed to "Opera friends for children" Association.

The singers organized and held a series of concerts, all funds from which were transferred to the needs of children. Every musician, singer, and conductor works for free.

The first concert to help Ukrainian children took place on 9 November 2014, in the cathedral of Saint-Jean-Laval (France). The Requiem in D minor, Op. 48 by Gabriel Faure accompanied by Andrii Shevchuk (piano).

On 28 November 2014, a concert was held in the Cathedral of St. Volodymyr the Great in Paris.Vasyl Slipak performed Requiem in D minor, Op. 48 of Gabriel Faure.

After returning from the war, in 2015, he continued volunteering: he gave charity concerts at the Ukrainian Center in Paris and helped orphans who lost their parents in the war.

On 13 February 2016[393], he performed the Requiem in D minor, Op. 48 of Gabriel Fauré.

On 16 April 2016, in the Notre-Dame-du-Mont-Carmel church in Barcelona-du-Gerre (France), the series of classical music concerts continued. Performed Requiem in D minor, Op. 48 of Gabriel Fauré.

==== Association "Crossing Europe" ====
The association "Crossing Europe" (in French - "A travers l'Europe"), as a connection between Ukrainian and European journalists, scientists, sociologists, public activists, was created in 1999. Since the beginning of the war, he has been helping children, widows, and families of soldiers.

V. Slipak joined the organization in January 2015. In April, he was elected deputy head of the organization. Together with Ukrainian musicians and singers who work or study in Paris, under the auspices of "A travers l'Europe", Vasyl organized on 14 July 2015, at the Cultural and Information Center of the Embassy of Ukraine in France, a charity concert for the benefit of orphans of the war in Ukraine and children of soldiers - defenders of the Motherland. Works of Ukrainian music and Western composers were performed. Thanks to the collected funds, war orphans were invited to vacation in Ukraine in the summer and fall of 2016.

A week before the trip to the front, in June 2016, Vasyl spent several days in Rose (France): together with other activists of the Ukrainian community, he prepared the territory for the recreation of children who died in the Heroes' War in the East of Ukraine. The singer himself translated the documents of the invited children for the visa center.

Vasyl Slipak is the honorary chairman of the association — posthumously.

==== Other charity events ====
In Paris on 21 December 2014, Vasyl Slipak and his friends commemorated 17 fallen soldiers of the 40th battalion of the Armed Forces. Blue and yellow ribbons with the names of the fallen heroes were attached to a Christmas tree donated by Moscow and installed opposite the Notre-Dame Cathedral. On this day, he created the charity organization "Ukrainian Brotherhood/Fraternité Ukrainienne", which still helps Ukrainian defenders.

On 27 June 2014, he took part in a charity concert held at the Cultural and Information Center of the Embassy of Ukraine in France. Performed "Be happy" on music. V. Barvinskyi, sl. B. Lepkoy.

He participated in the charity exhibition-fair on Ukrainian culture, which took place on 19 April 2015, in Vincennes (France) with the cooperation of two Ukrainian-French associations "ART culture and creativity" and "Ideas without borders".

In January 2016, he participated in a charity concert held at the Cultural and Information Center of the Embassy of Ukraine in France as part of Ludmila Chychuk's ART project "The Power of Art".

== Participation in the war in Eastern Ukraine ==
He went to war for the first time in May 2015. He stayed there for over a month. The call sign "Myth" in honor of Mephistopheles appeared immediately. He fought in Pisk near the Donetsk airport. Took part in the Battle of Avdiivka as part of the 1st separate assault company of the 7th separate battalion of the Ukrainian Volunteer Corps (DUK PS) — not because of political beliefs, he went to places where volunteers were taken. He returned wounded.

Vasyl did not plan to devote himself completely to the war. He was just a very active person. It was important for him to be where he was needed: on stage and in war.

He went to the front for the second time in September 2015, in the village of Vodiane near Mariupol, on the front line, returned to Paris in October.

In the summer of 18 June 2016, he went to Donbas for the third time, to deliver the collected aid to volunteer defenders, and planned to stay there for six months. But on 29 June 2016, while performing a combat mission as a machine gunner in the 1st Assault Company of the Ukrainian Volunteer Corps "Right Sector" (DUK PS), he died in battle around 6:00 a.m. from an enemy bullet of 12.7 mm caliber fired by a sniper from a large-caliber rifle.

Vasyl Slipak saved his brothers at the cost of his own life. Ukrainian defenders repelled an attack by Russian armed formations on the village of Luhanske (Bakhmut district, Donetsk region) from the city of Debaltseve and launched a counterattack, pushing the enemy from two fortified positions on the heights near the village Login.

== Farewell to the singer ==
On 30 June 2016, a farewell ceremony was held for V. Slipak in Dnipro. At the mourning ceremony in the regional hospital named after I.I. Hundreds of people came to Mechnikov. Vasyl Slipak was eulogized by the archpriest of the UOC KP, Fr. Dmytro Povorotny. After the farewell, the singer's body was sent to Lviv.

On 1 July 2016, a memorial service led by His Eminence Bishop Venedikt, assistant bishop of the Lviv Archdiocese of the UGCC, was held in the Garrison Church of the Holy Apostles Peter and Paul. Thousands of Lviv residents came to say goodbye to the New Hero of Ukraine, a world-famous opera singer. Together with the bishop, they prayed for the repose of the Hero's soul: Fr. Stepan Sus, abbot of the Garrison Church and Head of the Military Chaplaincy Center of LA UGCC, Fr. Bohdan Prakh, rector of the Ukrainian Catholic University, military chaplains and clerics of the UGCC, clergy of the RCC and UOC KP.

Vasyl Slipak was buried at the Lychakiv cemetery on the field of honorable burials No. 76.

On 22 November 2018, the installation of a monument on the grave of the Hero of Ukraine Vasyl Slipak was completed at the Lychakiv cemetery. The customer is the Department of Capital Construction of the Lviv Regional State Administration. The executor is FOP Volodymyr Kryskiv and his team. Artistic decoration — Mr. Andriy, processing the granite surface with a sandblasting mixture with air under pressure, making an inscription under gilding, and Volodymyr Stepanik, working with gold leaf. The monument is made of Tan granite, the deposit of which is located near the village. Tanske, Uman district, Cherkasy region.

The consecration of the monument took place on 29 June 2019. The fifth president of Ukraine, Petro Poroshenko, came to the Lychakiv cemetery to honor the memory of the hero on the anniversary of his death.

== Opera career ==
Born in 1974 in Lviv, Slipak liked to sing since his childhood. At the age of 11, Slipak joined the Lviv children's choir group Dudarik. After that, he continued his education at the Lviv Conservatory. During his education, Slipak participated in a vocal contest in the French city of Clermont, winning the contest. In 1996, Slipak received an invitation to perform at Opéra Bastille in Paris. In 1997 Slipak graduated from the Lysenko Music Academy in Lviv and then was invited to the Paris Opera where he became an opera singer. By 2011, he was at the top of his field, winning the prize for best male performer at the Armel Opera Competition and Festival in Szeged, Hungary, for his rendering of the Toreador Song from the opera Carmen.

== Repertoire ==
- Escamillo / Carmen / Georges Bizet
- Figaro / The Marriage of Figaro / Wolfgang Amadeus Mozart
- Ramfis / Aida / Giuseppe Verdi
- Boris Godunov / Boris Godunov / Modest Mussorgsky
- Igor Svyatoslavich / Prince Igor / Alexander Borodin
- Prince Gremin / Eugene Onegin / Pyotr Ilyich Tchaikovsky
- Il Commendatore (Don Pedro), Masetto / Don Giovanni / Wolfgang Amadeus Mozart
- Lindorf, Dapertutto, Coppélius, Miracle / The Tales of Hoffmann / Jacques Offenbach
- Sparafucile / Rigoletto / Giuseppe Verdi
- Sarastro, Speaker of the temple, Three priests / The Magic Flute / Wolfgang Amadeus Mozart
- Don Giovanni / Don Giovanni / Wolfgang Amadeus Mozart
- Colline / La bohème / Giacomo Puccini
- Méphistophélès / Faust / Charles Gounod
- Banco / Macbeth / Giuseppe Verdi
- Mainfroid, a Sicilian, adherent of Procida / Les vêpres siciliennes / Giuseppe Verdi
- Philippe II / Don Carlos / Giuseppe Verdi
- Basilio / The Barber of Seville / Gioachino Rossini
- Ralph / La jolie fille de Perth / Georges Bizet
- Count Rodolfo / La sonnambula / Vincenzo Bellini
- Don Alfonso / Così fan tutte / Wolfgang Amadeus Mozart
- Demon / The Demon / Anton Rubinstein
- Forester, Badger, Harašta, the poacher / The Cunning Little Vixen / Leoš Janáček
- Death, Loudspeaker / Der Kaiser von Atlantis / Viktor Ullmann

== Death ==
Slipak returned to Ukraine and participated in the Euromaidan in 2014. In 2015, Slipak joined the fights against pro-Russian separatists as a member of the 7th Battalion of the Volunteer Ukrainian Corps of the Right Sector. He took the military call sign Mif, a reference to his favorite aria of Mephistopheles from the opera Faust (his informal call sign was Myth). After the war in Donbass, Slipak planned to continue his career in Paris.

On 29 June 2016, at approximately 6 a.m., Slipak was killed by a sniper shot near Luhanske. Slipak's life was the subject of the 2018 documentary film Myth.

Ukrainian President Petro Poroshenko has awarded posthumously the title of Hero of Ukraine to Slipak.

Since 2017, the Vasyl Slipak International Competition of Young Vocalists has been held in his honor in Lviv.
