= Dudaryk =

A dudaryk is a Ukrainian duda player.

- "Dudaryk", arrangement of folk song by Mykola Leontovych
- "Dudaryk", tale by poet Pavlo Tychyna Kiev, 1950
- Dudaryk (choir)
- Dudaryky (ru/uk) film with Nataliya Sumska and Bohdan Stupka

== See also ==
- Dudar
- Duda
