= IAFE =

IAFE or Iafe may refer to:

- 7626 Iafe, an asteroid named after the Instituto de Astronomía y Física del Espacio
- The International Association of Financial Engineers
- Former name of the Instituto de Ferrocariles del Estado (IFE), the Venezuelan institution for railways.
- Instituto de Astronomía y Física del Espacio at the University of Buenos Aires
- The Institute for Advanced Financial Education
- The Rylsky Institute of Art Studies, Folklore and Ethnology in Kyiv, Ukraine
