= Academic Symphony Orchestra of the Lviv Philharmonic =

Ukrainian orchestra

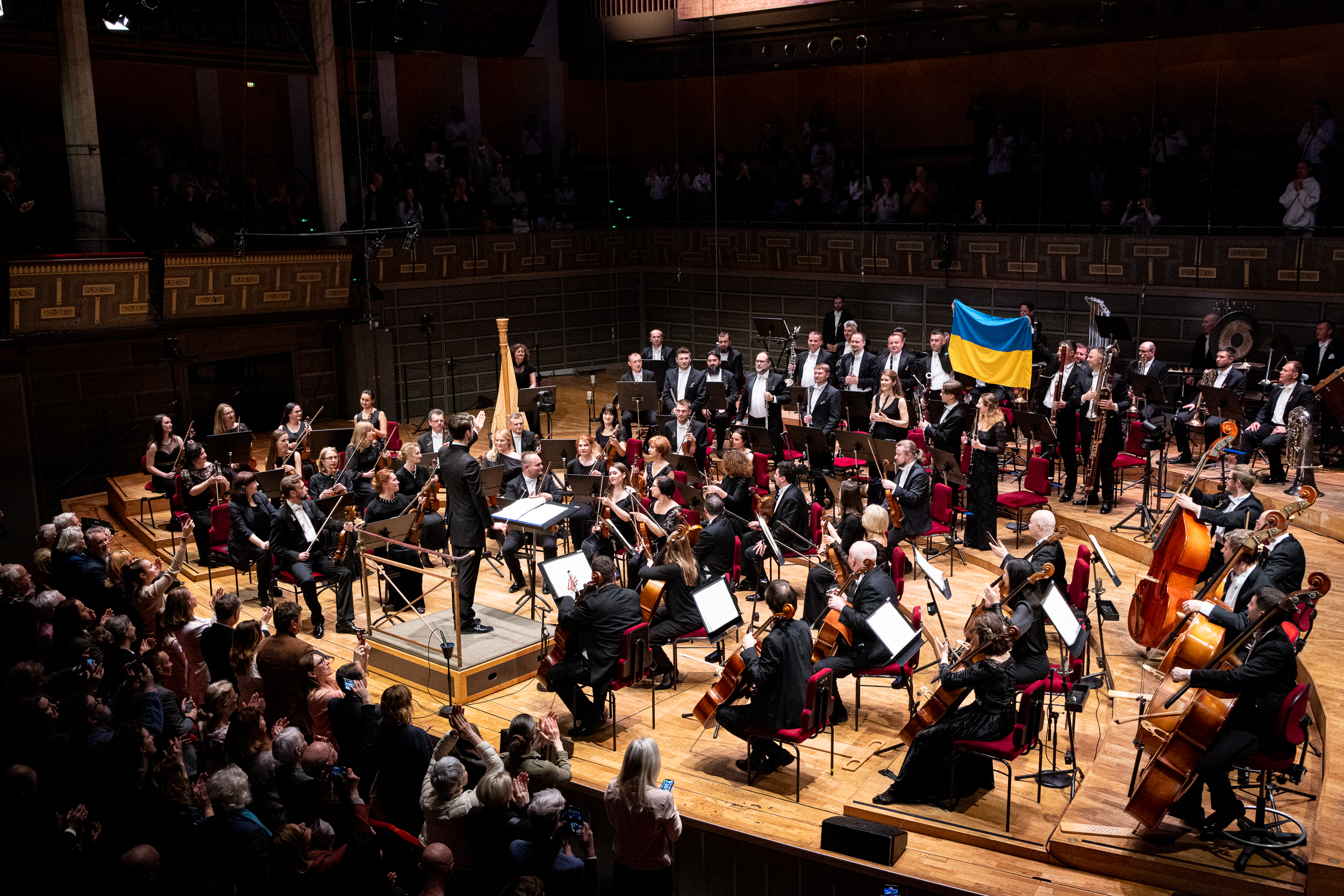
- The orchestra in Stockholm in May 2024
- Native name: Академічний симфонічний оркестр Львівської філармонії
- Founded: 1902
- Location: Lviv, Ukraine
- Website: philharmonia.lviv.ua//

The Academic Symphony Orchestra of the Lviv National Philharmonic is one of the oldest symphony orchestras in Ukraine.

In 1811 the conductor Lipiński initiated the creation the first symphony orchestra in Lviv (then a city in the Austrian Empire). The Academic Symphony Orchestra of the Lviv National was founded on 27 September 1902. The orchestra’s first conductor was Ludvík Vítězslav Čelanský, who gathered a group of 68 people, the vast majority of whom were graduates of the Prague Conservatory. Following the 1903 season, when the orchestra toured Poland, the orchestra was disbanded. For a long time, the Lviv Philharmonic did not have its own orchestra. Its director Leopold Litinsky made an attempt to create such a group from among the best musicians of military orchestras of several local infantry regiments, which continued the concert activities of the Philharmonic of 1903.

During 1919 to 1939, the symphony orchestra of the GMT Conservatory remained practically the only permanent orchestra in Lviv, which was during that period the Second Polish Republic's third-most populous city. With the arrival of the Soviets in December 1939 came the Resolution of the Council of People's Commissars of the USSR, which planned to create a new symphony orchestra in Lviv. The Symphony Orchestra of the Lviv State Regional Philharmonic continued to perform concerts until the German occupation of the city (1941–1944), during which time it was disbanded. It was reformed after the Soviets retook the city in August 1944.

Post-war conductors have included Yuriy Lutsiv, Demyan Pelekhaty, and Ivan Yuzyuk. The conductors are currently Marko Komonko and Mykola Gavyuk. The orchestra has toured around the world, and is a regular participant in international festivals such as the International Festival of Musical Art Virtuoso.

== History ==
=== Background ===
In 1796, violinist and conductor Józef Elsner initiated the creation of the first Music Academy in Lviv. It brought together professional musicians and educated amateurs and became the first concert organization in the city. In 1799, Karol Lipiński became the first violinist and concertmaster of the Lviv Theatre, and from 1811 its conductor. Lipiński initiated the creation of the symphony orchestra. Franz Xaver Wolfgang Mozart, son of Wolfgang Amadeus Mozart, founded the Society of St. Cecilia in 1826. The activity of the society became an impetus for the formation of new professional cells of organized musical and artistic life. Symphony concerts with the participation of professional musicians and amateurs were also organized by the Society of Friends of Music, which operated since 1834. Within a few years, it received an official status under the name Society for the Development of Music in Galicia, later Galician Music Society (GMT).

=== Formation of the orchestra ===
The Academic Symphony Orchestra of the Lviv National Philharmonic named after Myroslav Skoryk was formed in 1902. The first concert of the newly-created orchestra took place on 27 September 1902 in the Count Stanislav Skarbko Theatre. The main conductor of the orchestra was Ludvík Vítězslav Čelanský, who gathered a group of musicians, most of whom were graduates of the Prague Conservatory. Henryk Jarecki and Henryk Melcer-Szczawiński worked next to him at the conductor's desk. During the first season, more than 114 concerts were held with the participation of the orchestra, Until November 1903, concerts took place 4-5 times a week.

Richard Strauss, Mahler, Ruggero Leoncavallo, Mieczysław Karłowicz, and Lorenzo Perozi performed as invited conductors with the Lviv ensemble. Strauss conducted the orchestra on January 5, 1903. He directed his own compositions, the symphonic poems Don Juan and Death and Transfiguration, as well as the Symphony No. 5 by Beethoven. On April 2, 1903, the Lviv ensemble was conducted by Mahler. The program of the concert included the Symphony No. 7 by Beethoven, the Roman Carnival by Berlioz, the overture to Tannhäuser by Wagner and the First Symphony by Mahler. Once again, the latter was played in a second concert (April 4). Along with this composition, the musicians also performed Beethoven's Seventh Symphony, overtures, and symphonic fragments from the operas Tristan und Isolde, Tannhäuser, and Die Meistersinger von Nürnberg by Wagner.

In May 1903 (May 7 and 9), Leoncavallo conducted the Symphony Orchestra. The concert's program included fragments from the operas Pagliacci and I Medici, Neapolitan suite, Old Suite and the symphonic poem Seraphitus-Seraphita. After their 1903 tour, that included concerts in Łódź, Warsaw, Vilnius, Saint Petersburg, and Kyiv, the orchestra ceased its activities.

For a long time, the Lviv Philharmonic did not have its own orchestra. Its director Leopold Litinsky made an attempt to create such a group from among the best musicians of military orchestras of several local infantry regiments, which continued the concert activities of the Philharmonic in 1903–1904. In the following years, touring orchestras primarily performed in Lviv.

=== 1919–1944 ===
During 1919 to 1939, the symphony orchestra of the GMT Conservatory remained practically the only permanent orchestra in Lviv. In May 1921, the Ukrainian State Musical Orchestra joined forces with musicians from the Polish Union of Musicians and Lviv's City Orchestra to form a new orchestra new group with 106 members. It performed under the auspices of the Lviv Philharmonic and M. Türk’s Concert Bureau (it united performers from the GMT and the City Theatre and operated until 1924). His programs were prepared by Bronislaw Wolfstal, Adam Soltis, Alfred Stadler, and Milan Zuna. During this period, in particular in the concert season of 1931–1932, due to the economic crisis, the musical departments of the City Theatre were disbanded. The musicians joined the orchestra of the Society of Music and Opera Lovers, starting their own concert activities with a series of symphony concerts.

Following the Soviet invasion of Poland in September 1939 and the arrival of Soviet power, a Resolution of the Council of People's Commissars of the USSR was instituted on 19 December. It concerned the organization of cultural and artistic institutions in the six newly-formed western regions of Ukraine, and the reorganization of art institutions and educational institutions by the Soviet People's Commissar and the Central Committee of the Communist Party. A state regional philharmonic with a symphony orchestra, and a Ukrainian choir, with a variety sector and soloists was planned to be created in Lviv. The symphony orchestra was formed under the regional radio committee in 1939. The first performance was on 20 December 1939 with Isaac Pain, a 27-year-old a graduate of the Kiev Conservatory as the conductor. In early 1940, the orchestra was renamed the Symphony Orchestra of the Lviv State Regional Philharmonic.The Lviv conductor and composer Mykola Kolessa was invited to work alongside Pain.

During the German occupation of Ukraine (from 1941 to 1944), the Philharmonic Hall did not operate. In the post-war period, the orchestra had to be assembled anew, which happened with the joint efforts of Isaac Pain, Dionysius Khabal, Nestor Gornitsky and Mykola Kolessa. The team resumed its work in August 1944. The first concerts featured works by Stanyslav Lyudkevych, Vasyl Barvinsky, Mykola Lysenko, Stanisław Moniuszko, Saint-Saëns, Tchaikovsky, and Carl Maria von Weber.

=== Post-war years ===
During 1953 to 1957, and later in 1987–1989, the conductor of the orchestra was Yuriy Lutsiv. From 1964 to 1987, the orchestra was led by Demyan Pelekhaty, who introduced to its repertoire works by contemporary composers. From 1989 the main conductor of the orchestra was Ivan Yuzyuk, the conductors were Roman Filipchuk and Yarema Kolessa. Later this position was held by Aidar Torybayev, Ilya Stupel, Taras Krysa.

=== Post-independence ===
Since 2018, the orchestra has been cooperating with American conductor of Ukrainian origin Theodore Kuchar, who is now the main guest conductor of the orchestra.

In 2006, the Lviv National Philharmonic Symphony Orchestra was awarded the title "Academic".. From 2007 the orchestra's principal conductor A. Toribaev, who popularised compositions by such modern Ukrainian composers as V. Kaminsky, O. Kozarenko, Y. Lanyuk, P. Sylvestroba, M. Skoryk, E. Stankovych.

In 2018, with the participation of this group, during the Myroslav Skoryk author's concert, the Lviv Philharmonic received "national" status. Since September, 2020, the Philharmonic has been named after this Ukrainian composer. As of 2026 the orchestra's conductors are Serhii Khorovets, Taras Verhun, Volodymyr Syvokhip, Serhiy Burko, and Roman Kreslenko.

The orchestra is a regular participant in international festivals, and has toured in countries around the world. It has made a number of recordings for international labels, including Naxos.

== Sources ==
- Mazepa, Teresa Leshekivna (2018). Галицьке музичне товариство у культурномистецькому процесі xiх – початку хх століття [The Galician musical society in the cultural and artistic process of the 19th and early 20th centuries] (PhD thesis) (in Ukrainian). Kyiv, Ukraine: National Academy of Music.
- Melnyk, L. (2006). Львівська філармонія: до і після століття [Lviv Philharmonic: Before and after the Century] (in Ukrainian). Lviv, Ukraine.
- Shevchuk, O. (2011). Українська музична енциклопедія [Ukrainian Music Encyclopedia] (in Ukrainian). Vol. 3. Kyiv, Ukraine: Rylsky Institute of Art Studies, Folklore and Ethnology. pp. 222–223.
