= Teona Todua =

Ukrainian operatic soprano (born 1997)

- Born: 1997 (age 28–29); Georgia
- Education: Ukrainian National Tchaikovsky Academy of Music
- Occupation: Operatic soprano
- Awards: Neue Stimmen

Teona Todua is a Georgia-born Ukrainian operatic soprano who received prizes at international competitions including Neue Stimmen and received training at the opera studios of the Teatr Wielki, Warsaw, and the Paris Opera where she performed as the Princess in Ravel's L'enfant et les sortilèges in 2023. She appeared as Despinio in Martinů's The Greek Passion at the 2023 Salzburg Festival and as Fiordiligi in Mozart's Così fan tutte at the Oper Frankfurt in 2025.

== Life and career ==
Todua was born in Georgia in 1997 and grew up in Donetsk, Ukraine. She first took piano lessons until 2011. She then studied voice, first in Donetsk, then at the Academy of Music in Kyiv, where she achieved a MA degree in 2022. During her studies, she won the third prize of the International Grandi Voci Singing Competition in Istanbul in 2020 and won the Vasyl Slipak International Competition of Young Vocalists in Lviv. She participated in the 2021 program of the Dolora Zajick Institute for Young Dramatic Voices in the US and became a member of the Opera studio of the Teatr Wielki, Warsaw.

She was a member of the opera studio of the Paris Opera from 2022 to 2024. She performed the soprano solo of Rossini's Stabat Mater with the Opéra de Dijon. Roles at the Paris Opera included a Woman in Mozart's Le nozze di Figaro in 2022, the Princess in Ravel's L'enfant et les sortilèges in 2023 and the Countess Ceprano in Verdi's Rigoletto in 2024. In an artistic exchange of the Lindemann Young Artist Development Program she trained at the studio of the Metropolitan Opera in New York City in 2023. It concluded with a concert with opera arias at the house. Todua appeared as Despinio in Martinů's The Greek Passion at the 2023 Salzburg Festival. She achieved a third prize of the 2024 Neue Stimmen competition. She performed as the Voice from Heaven in Verdi's Don Carlos at the Opéra Bastille in 2025, conducted by Simone Young.

Todua appeared first as Fiordiligi in Mozart's Così fan tutte in the opening performance of the 2025/26 season at the Oper Frankfurt, conducted by Thomas Guggeis and directed by Mariame Clément. The reviewer from the Frankfurter Allgemeine Zeitung noted the magnificent acting skills of all six protagonists, and Todua mastering all the coloraturas of her demanding role, on the same level as Kelsey Lauritano as Dorabella. Another reviewer wrote that she displayed "great vocal virtuosity" and impressively expressed the character's inner turmoil and despair, despite her proclaimed determination.
