= Vasyl Slipak International Competition of Young Vocalists =

The Vasyl Slipak International Competition of Young Vocalists is a Ukrainian singing competition. It is named in honor of Vasyl Slipak, a Ukrainian opera singer who was a soloist of the Paris National Opera, a participant in the War in Donbas and Hero of Ukraine. The competition is held in Lviv. The first competition was held in 2017 from December 15 to December 20 at the Lviv Regional Philharmonic. There are four categories (soprano, mezzo-soprano, tenor, baritone/bass) in two age groups: students of educational institutions I and II levels of accreditation (specialty – academic singing) up to 22 years old, including two rounds, and students of educational institutions III and IV levels of accreditation (specialty – academic singing) up to 30 years old, including three rounds. The competition program is defined by the Competition Regulations. President of Ukraine Volodymyr Zelenskyy signed an order to support the competition.

== History ==
The idea of holding the competition belongs to Volodymyr Syvokhyp, the general director of the Lviv Philharmonic.

The Department for Culture, Nationalities and Religions of the Lviv Regional State Administration informed the Ministry of Culture of Ukraine on January 20, 2017.

On March 27, 2017, the Department for Culture, Nationalities and Religions of the regional state administration announced 12 competitions in various areas to receive financial support from the regional budget. The financial resource for the project is provided in the direction of the comprehensive program for the development of culture in the Lviv region.

The competition is held on December 15–20 every two years in Lviv. The first one was held in 2017." In 2019, the competition became international. Also in 2019, President of Ukraine Volodymyr Zelenskyy signed an order to support the competition.

The initiator and organizer of the competition is the Lviv National Philharmonic in cooperation with the Department of Culture, Nationalities and Religion of the Lviv Regional State Administration, the Vasyl Slipak Foundation with the support of the Lviv Regional State Administration and the Lviv Oblas Council. Patrons, friends, and colleagues from Ukraine, the United States, Canada, and France, as well as artistic groups, including the Ukrainian Choir Dumka (New York), the Ukrainian Bandurist Chorus named after Taras Shevchenko (Detroit), the Ukrainian Men's Choir Prometheus (Philadelphia), the Axios Choir, and the Ukrainian Male Chorus of Edmonton, supported the competition. The competition is held in cooperation with creative and musical educational institutions, including the Ukrainian National Tchaikovsky Academy of Music.

== Jury ==
Year	Chairman of the jury	Jury members
2017	Serhiy Magera, Olga Pasichnyk — co-chairs	Valery Buimister, Sofia Solovyi, Oleg Makhlai (USA), Taras Krysa (Ukraine — USA)
2019	Olga Pasichnyk	Paul Gauglier (France), Oleg Likhach, Dmytro Katsal, Axel Kresin (Germany), Tatyana Vakhnovska
2021	Zoryana Kushpler	Paul Gauglier (France), Beata Klatka (Poland), Oleksandr Pushniak (Ukraine – Germany), Slawomir Jakubek (Slovakia), Sofia Solovyi (Ukraine), Adrian Kelly (England)
2023	Zoryana Kushpler	Sofia Solovii (Ukraine), Axel Kresin (Germany), Ivan Cherednichenko (Ukraine), Taras Konoshchenko (Ukraine — Germany)

== Winners ==
The competition regulations define the following awards: one Grand Prix, one first place in each category, two second places in each category, two third places in each category, two Diploma winners in each category, Diplomas for the best concertmasters of the competition (3-5), Diplomas for the best teachers (3-5).

Year	Grand Prix
2017	Not awarded
2019	Inna Fedoriy (soprano)
2021	Not awarded

=== The first category ===
Year	And the prize	II prize	III prize	Diploma
2017	Kosheleva Sofia (soprano)	It was not awarded	Tetiana Ilchenko (soprano), Maryna Zinkevich (soprano), Daniil Kryvskyi (baritone)	Volodymyr Sokolovsky (baritone)
2019	Daniel Semsichko (baritone)	Teona Todua (soprano), Anatoly-Artem Konoplyanik (bass)	Anzhelika Bondarchuk (soprano), Olga Melnychuk (soprano)	Anastasia Savaryna (soprano), Zahary Paliy (bass), Daria Akulova (soprano), Angelina Trushevska (soprano)
2021	Daria Kolisan (soprano)	Volodymyr Shchur (baritone/bass)	Yuriy Strakhov (baritone/bass)	Daniel Semsichko (baritone/bass), Ivan Kovalev (baritone/bass)

=== The second category ===
Year	And the prize	II prize	III prize	Diploma
2017	Tverdova Anna (soprano)	Victoria Melnyk (soprano), Demyan Matushevskyi (baritone)	Kateryna Levitska (soprano), Tlusch Vladyslav (baritone), Huga Orysya (mezzo-soprano)	Lopata Oksana (soprano), Yankovsky Viktor (baritone)
2019	Maxim Nazarenko (baritone)	Georgy Veshapidze (baritone), Roman Perevertun (baritone)	Iryna Vashchenko (soprano), Piotr Kalina (tenor) ( Poland )	Mar'yana Berezyak (mezso-soprano), Liu Tao (tenor) ( China )
2021	Teona Todua (soprano)	Justyna Khil (soprano), Mykhailo Kushlyk (tenor)	Oleksandra Dyachenko (mezzo-soprano)	Nazar Mikulyak (baritone/bass), Roman Markovich (baritone/bass)

=== Special awards ===
2017	Victoria Melnyk (soprano) — a diploma for the best performance of an aria from an opera by a Ukrainian composer	Tlusch Vladyslav (baritone) — a diploma for a bright stage image	Sofiya Kosheleva (soprano) — a diploma for the originality of Ukrainian solo singing	Daniil Kryvskyi (baritone) — a diploma for a bright presentation of a Ukrainian folk song
