= Ukrainian Musical Encyclopedia =

Ukrainian-language encyclopedia on music

- Author: Multiple
- Original title: Українська музична енциклопедія
- Language: Ukrainian
- Genre: Encyclopedia
- Publisher: Rylsky Institute of Art Studies, Folklore, and Ethnology
- Publication place: Ukraine
- ISBN: 966-02-4099-6

The Ukrainian Musical Encyclopedia (Ukrainian: Українська музична енциклопедія, romanized: Ukrainska muzychna entsiklopediia) is an encyclopedia on Ukrainian music and musicians published by the Rylsky Institute of Art Studies, Folklore, and Ethnology, starting in 2006. Its editor-in-chief is Hanna Skrypnyk. Publication and distribution of the encyclopedia was hindered by the Cabinet of Ministers' Resolution No. 1180 of 28 July 2003 on paid services provided by budgetary scientific institutions. The Ukrainian Musical Encyclopedia was the subject of a presentation in the conference Ukraine in Music History: A Reassessment, held on 19–21 May 2023 in Vienna.

Each volume contains around 2,000 articles and 1,000 illustrations. The original idea and development of the project belonged to Oleksandr Kostiuk. The authors were from the Department of Musicology and Art Studies. As of 2023, six volumes have been published.
