= Ludvík Vítězslav Čelanský =

Czech conductor and composer (1870–1931)

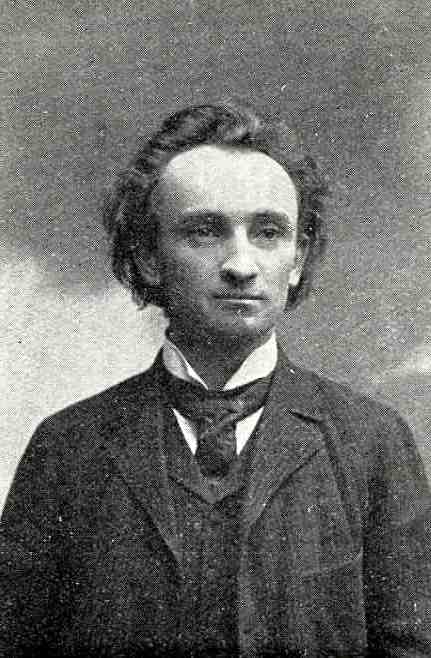
Ludvík Vítězslav Čelanský

Ludvík Vítězslav Čelanský (cs) (17 July 1870 in Vienna – 27 October 1931 in Prague) was a Czech conductor and composer. He was founder and first principal conductor of the Czech Philharmonic Orchestra.

== Biography ==
Jan Čelanský, Ludvík's father, worked as a kapellmeister in Horní Krupá (Havlíčkův Brod district). Ludvík studied at the gymnasium in Havlíčkův Brod, and from 1887 to 1891 at the teaching institute in Kutná Hora. He worked as a teacher in Dolní Krupá for one year before devoting himself exclusively to music. From 1892 to 1894 he studied composition with K. Stecker at the Prague Conservatory, then at the dramatic school of the National Theatre and at Pivoda Operatic School. Čelanský was engaged as a kapellmeister at the opera house in Plzeň until 1895, in Zagreb from 1898 to 1899, and then as the third kapellmeister of the National Theatre Orchestra. He was forced to withdraw in 1900 when Karel Kovařovic took the administration of the theatre.

Čelanský left for Lviv, where he established the opera house. Following his return, in 1901, he founded the Czech Philharmonic with striking members of the National Theatre Orchestra. However, he yielded the administration of the orchestra to Oskar Nedbal and returned to Lviv where he founded another institution - the Lviv Philharmonic Orchestra (1902–1904). He simultaneously led the opera stages in Kraków and in Łódź and was engaged as a director of the Philharmonic Orchestra in Kiev (from 1904 to 1905) and Warsaw (from 1905 to 1906). In 1907 Čelanský established an opera house in the Vinohrady district of Prague. Later he became the director of the Apollo Theatre in Paris (from 1909). In recognition of his performances of the works of Jacques Offenbach, Čelanský was appointed an officer of L'Académie française. During World War I, he refused the post of director at the comic opera in New York City. Following the Czechoslovak proclamation of independence in 1918, Čelanský became the director of the Czech Philharmonic again, but was soon replaced by Václav Talich. Čelanský spent his later years in Prague, where he worked as a music teacher. During these years he recorded two of Dvořák's Slavonic Dances for His Master's Voice with a group of musicians from the National Theatre.

== Legacy ==
Čelanský concentrated his interest mainly on Slavic composers of Romantic music. He was particularly renowned as a conductor of Smetana's symphonic cycle Má vlast (My Country), Dvořák's Slavonic Dances and the works of Zdeněk Fibich. Čelanský was a talented opera conductor, but his potential was not fully realized. He contributed to the Czech and international musical culture as an organizer and founder of orchestras and music institutions.

== Compositions ==
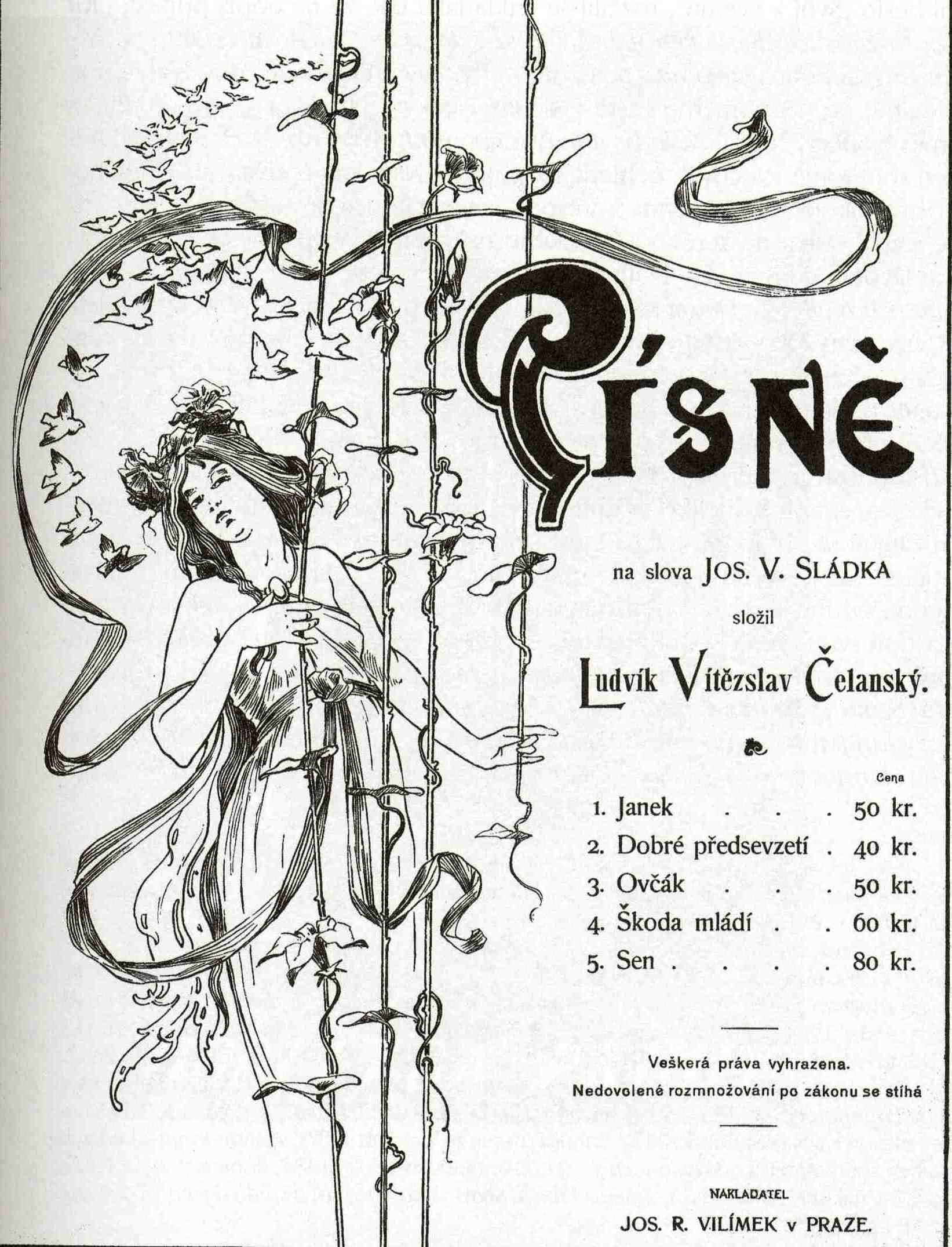
The front page of the "Songs" cycle by Ludvík Čelanský

The compositions of Ludvík Čelanský are deeply influenced by Romantic music. He wrote concertant melodramas in the style of Zdeněk Fibich. His only opera, Kamilla, represents an attempt to unite melodrama and singspiel. During his time in Paris, his music was influenced by French impressionism. His compositions from this period are quite colourful. Some of his scores (e.g. Symphony "From My Life") remained in Kiev and in Paris. Čelanský also experimented with film music in his later years.

Opera

- Kamilla (published 1897); in 1 act with libretto by the composer (Note: The opera was on the subject of a failed love affair between Čelanský and Kamila Urválková; Urválková later persuaded Leoš Janáček to compose his opera Destiny to counteract Čelanský's portrayal of her.)

Orchestra

- Premiéra na vsi (Premiere in the Countryside), Overture (1900)
- Vzkříšení Polsky (Resurrection of Poland), Overture (1904)
- Symphony "From My Life" in five movements
- Duchovní vývoj člověka dle starého zákona (The Spiritual Evolution of Man According to Ancient Law), Symphonic Trilogy (1915–1918)

1. Adam
2. Noe (Noah)
3. Mojžíš (Moses)

- Hymnus slunci (Hymn to the Sun), Symphonic Poem (1919)

Songs

- Nálady (Moods) (1895); words by the composer
- Melancholické písně (Melancholic Songs) (1895); words by Jaroslav Kvapil
- Ten Songs on Words of Josef Václav Sládek and Karel Želenský (1896)
- Twelve Songs on Words of František Serafínský Procházka (1902)
- Ukolébavka (Lullaby) for Voice and Orchestra (1904)
- Píseň o matičce (A Song about Mother)

Chorus

- Vlast (Homeland)
- Srbské kolo (Serbian Round Dance)

Melodramas

- Žebrák (The Beggar) (1894)
- Země (Earth) (1894)
- Balada o duši Jana Nerudy (Ballad on the Soul of Jan Neruda) (1895)
- Česká píseň (Czech Song) (1902)
- Bratři (Brothers) (1903)
- Zvony (Bells) (1903); words by Edgar Allan Poe

Sacred

- Pět duchovních písní (Five Sacred Songs, 1916)
- Te Deum (1916)

== See also ==
- Academic Symphony Orchestra of the Lviv Philharmonic
