= Mariame Clément =

French opera director (born 1974)

- Born: 1974 (age 51–52); France
- Education: École normale supérieure
- Occupation: Opera director
- Website: mariameclement.net

Mariame Clément (born 1974) is a French opera director. Her first production, in 2004, featured Rossini's Il signor Bruschino and Puccini's Gianni Schicchi at the Opéra de Lausanne. She staged the first French performance of Wagner's Das Liebesverbot in 2016 and the first revival of Offenbach's 1860 Barkouf in 2018. Clément made her debut at the Salzburg Festival in 2024 with Offenbach's Les contes d'Hoffmann. In 2025 she directed Mozart's Così fan tutte for the season's opening performance at the Oper Frankfurt.

== Life and career ==
Clément was born in Paris in 1974; her mother is Iranian. She studied literature and art history at the École normale supérieure and then lectured French at Harvard University from 1997 to 1999. She moved to Berlin where she began working on a dissertation about Persian medieval miniatures. She was a volunteer in stage direction at the Berlin State Opera, and then worked as an assistant at opera houses including the Opéra National de Montpellier and the Opéra du Rhin in Strasbourg. She won a third prize at the European Opera Directing Competition in 2003, which prompted her first commission as a director in 2004 at the Opéra de Lausanne. There, she staged two short operas, Rossini's Il signor Bruschino and Puccini's Gianni Schicchi, with scenes and costumes designed by Julia Hansen, with whom she collaborated regularly. Hansen was awarded the 2010 prize from the Syndicat Professionnel de la Critique de France for their work on Rameau's Platée at the Opéra du Rhin in Strasbourg. In 2011 Clément directed Donizetti's Don Pasquale for the Glyndebourne Festival in a production that went on tour and was still played in 2022.

In 2012 Clément directed a museum exhibition, Die Leidenschaften (The Passions), at the Deutsches Hygiene-Museum in Dresden. She staged the world premiere of Philippe Hurel's Les Pigeons d'argile at the Théâtre du Capitole in Toulouse in 2014. In 2016 she staged the first French performance of Wagner's Das Liebesverbot at the Opéra national du Rhin in Strasbourg. In that venue she also directed in 2018 the first staged performance of Offenbach's Barkouf after the opera's 1860 premiere. At the Grand Théâtre de Genève, she staged Donizetti's Tudor operas, Anna Bolena in 2021, Maria Stuarda in 2023, and Roberto Devereux in 2024. She directed Die schweigsame Frau by R. Strauss at the Badisches Staatstheater Karlsruhe and Léhar's Die lustige Witwe at the Vienna Volksoper, both in 2023. She directed Mozart's Don Giovanni at the Glyndebourne Festival in 2023, portraying the title character, sung by Andrey Zhilikhovsky. His performance was described by Richard Bratby of The Spectator as, "compelling without glamourising", with a "cold hard chill" in his voice. That cynicism in his interactions with the women occurred in the banquet scene, when he was sitting on a giant cream cake.

Clément made her debut at the Salzburg Festival in 2024, directing Offenbach's Les contes d'Hoffmann, with Benjamin Bernheim in the title role and the Vienna Philharmonic conducted by Marc Minkowski. She directed Mozart's Così fan tutte for the opening performance of the 2025/26 season at the Oper Frankfurt, conducted by Thomas Guggeis, with Teona Todua as Fiordiligi and Kelsey Lauritano as Dorabella. The reviewer from the Frankfurter Allgemeine Zeitung reported that Clément opened, during the overture, with a scene of a contemporary double wedding that froze as a tableau at the point when Fiordiligi was supposed to sign the contract (i.e. the onstage actors suddenly assumed a still and silent pose, such that they resembled a sculpted group or tableau, representing stopped or frozen time). The wedding scene's stage action returned to that moment near the end of the performance, and following the emotional turmoil between the four protagonists. With the wedding scene revived, the two wedding couples then dismissed the guests, and partied alone. The reviewer noted Clément's subtle shaping of the characters and their interactions.

Clément is married; she has lived in Berlin and then returned to Paris.

== Productions ==
- Mozart: Così fan tutte, Oper Frankfurt 2025
- Mozart: Le nozze di Figaro, Glyndebourne Festival 2024
- Gounod Roméo et Juliette, Berlin State Opera, Berlin 2024
- Offenbach: Les contes d'Hoffmann, Salzburg Festival 2024
- Donizetti: Roberto Devereux, Grand Théâtre de Genève 2024
- Donizetti: Maria Stuarda, Genève 2023
- Mozart: Don Giovanni, Glyndebourne Festival
- R. Strauss: Die schweigsame Frau, Badisches Staatstheater Karlsruhe 2023
- Léhar: Die lustige Witwe, Vienna Volksoper 2023
- Rossini: Il turco in Italia
- Donizetti: Anna Bolena, Genève 2021
- Monteverdi: Il ritorno d'Ulisse in patria, Staatstheater Nürnberg 2018
- Offenbach: Barkouf, Strasbourg 2018
- Wagner: Das Liebesverbot, Opéra national du Rhin, Strasbourg 2016.
- Donizetti: Poliuto, Glyndebourne Festival 2015
- Philippe Hurel: Les Pigeons d'argile, Théâtre du Capitole, Toulouse 2014
- Mozart: Le nozze di Figaro, Oper Dortmund 2013
- Humperdinck: Hänsel und Gretel, Palais Garnier, Paris 2013
- Mozart: Die Zauberflöte, Opéra national du Rhin, Strasbourg 2012
- Handel: Agrippina, Vlaamse Opera, Gent 2012
- Donizetti: Don Pasquale, Glyndebourne Festival 2011
- R. Strauss: Der Rosenkavalier, Strasburg 2011
- Rameau: Platée, Strasburg 2010
- Rameau: Castor et Pollux, Theater an der Wien 2010
- Cavalli: Giasone, Vlaamse Opera 2009
- Rossini: Il barbiere di Siviglia, Bern Theatre 2007
- Offenbach: La Belle Hélène, Strasburg 2006
- Rossini: Il viaggio a Reims, Bern Theatre, Oviedo, Tel-Aviv 2005
- Rossini: Il signor Bruschino, Puccini: Gianni Schicchi, Opéra de Lausanne 2004
