= Czech Philharmonic =

Symphony orchestra based in Prague

- Orchestra
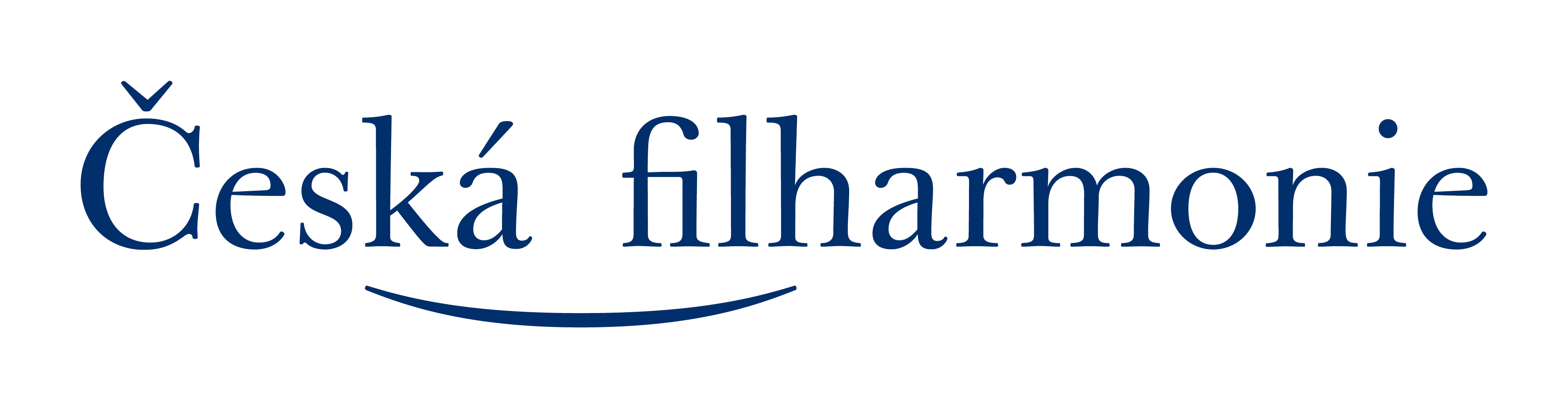
- Native name: Česká filharmonie
- Founded: 1896
- Location: Prague
- Concert hall: Rudolfinum
- Principal conductor: Semyon Bychkov
- Website: ceskafilharmonie.cz

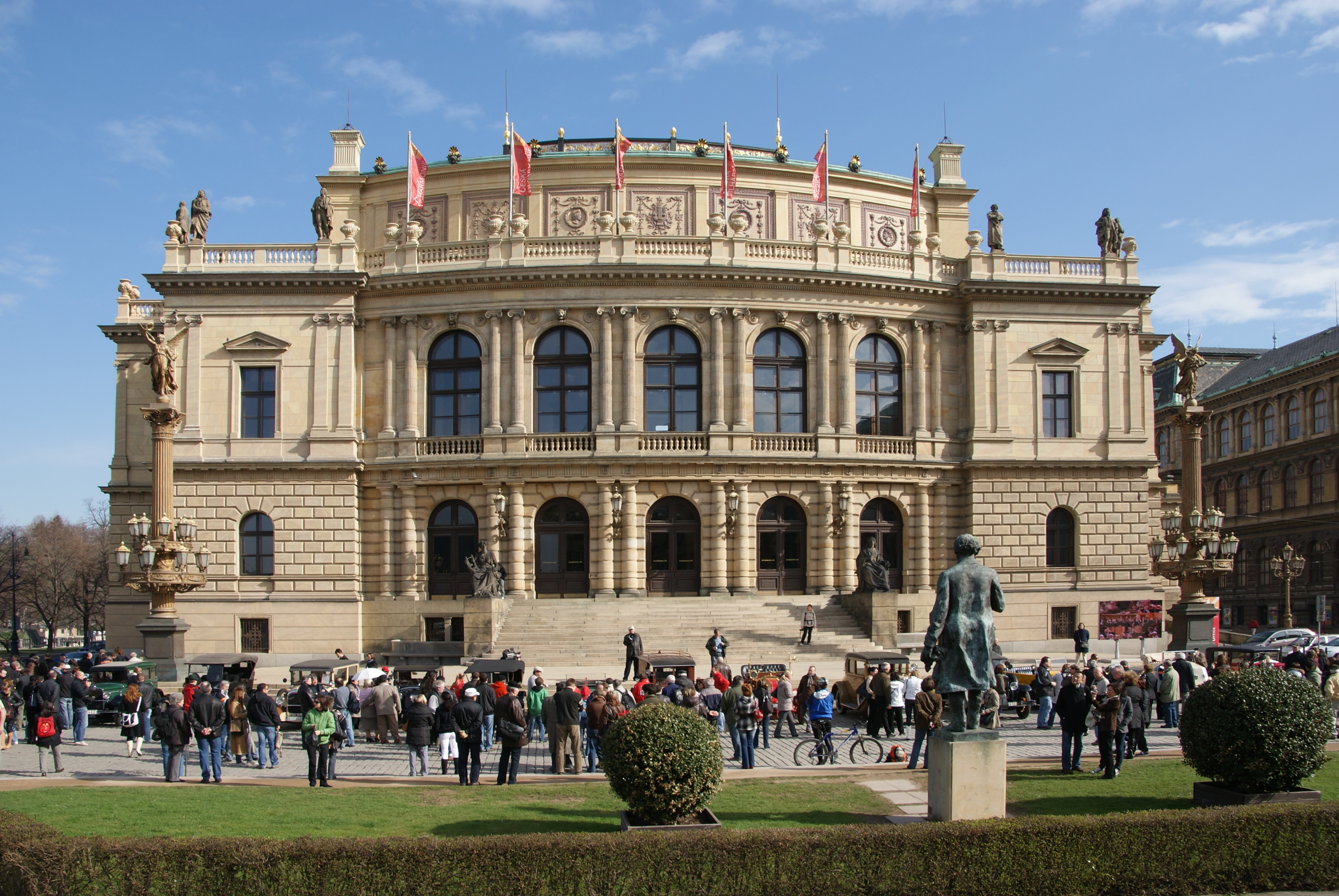
Rudolfinum

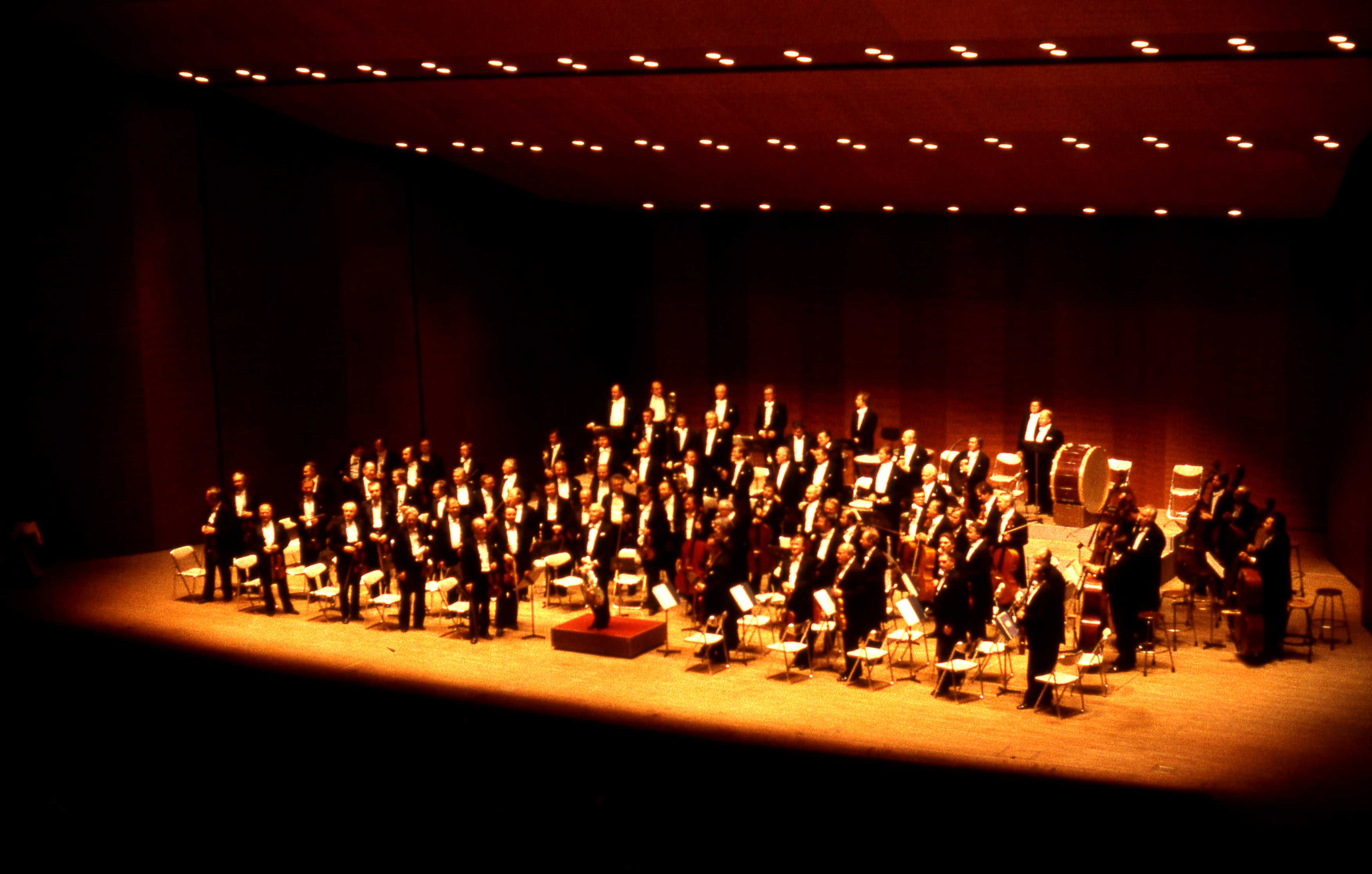
Czech Philharmonic in Kobe, Japan

The Czech Philharmonic (Czech: Česká filharmonie) is a symphony orchestra based in Prague. Its principal performing venue is the Rudolfinum concert hall.

== History ==
The name "Czech Philharmonic Orchestra" appeared for the first time in 1894, as the title of the orchestra of the Prague National Theatre. It played its first concert under its current name on 4 January 1896 when Antonín Dvořák conducted his own compositions, but it did not become fully independent from the opera until 1901. The first representative concert took place on 15 October 1901 conducted by Ludvík Čelanský, the first artistic director of the orchestra. In 1908, Gustav Mahler led the orchestra in the world premiere of his Symphony No. 7. The orchestra first became internationally known during the principal conductorship of Václav Talich, who held the post from 1919 to 1931, and again from 1933 to 1941. In 1941, Talich and the orchestra made a controversial journey to Germany, where they performed Bedřich Smetana's My Country in a concert enforced by the German offices.

Subsequent chief conductors were Rafael Kubelík (1942–1948), Karel Ančerl (1950–1968), Václav Neumann (1968–1989), Jiří Bělohlávek (1990–1992), Gerd Albrecht (1993–1996), Vladimir Ashkenazy (1996–2003), Zdeněk Mácal (2003–2007), and Eliahu Inbal (2009–2012). In the wake of the Velvet Revolution, under new conditions of financial insecurity, the orchestra was reorganised in 1991 and controversially voted to appoint Gerd Albrecht its new chief conductor and to dismiss Bělohlávek. Instead of remaining until Albrecht's accession, Bělohlávek resigned from the orchestra in 1992. In December 2010, the orchestra announced the reappointment of Bělohlávek as chief conductor, beginning in 2012, with an initial contract of 4 years. The orchestra's official English name changed from the "Czech Philharmonic Orchestra" to the "Czech Philharmonic" at the beginning of 2015. In January 2017, the orchestra announced the extension of Bělohlávek's contract through the 2021–2022 season. Bělohlávek continued to serve as the orchestra's chief conductor until his death on 31 May 2017.

In 2013, Semyon Bychkov first guest-conducted the orchestra, which subsequently named him director of its Tchaikovsky Project. In October 2017, the orchestra announced the appointment of Bychkov as its next chief conductor and music director, effective with the 2018–2019 season. In September 2022, the orchestra announced the extension of Bychkov's contract through 2028.

Past principal guest conductors of the orchestra have included Sir Charles Mackerras and Manfred Honeck. Jakub Hrůša became the orchestra's 'permanent guest conductor' as of the 2015–2016 season. In October 2017, the orchestra announced the appointments of Hrůša and of Tomáš Netopil as joint principal guest conductors of the orchestra, effective with the 2018–2019 season. In February 2024, the orchestra announced the appointment of Sir Simon Rattle as its next principal guest conductor, for a period of five years, with the title of 'Rafael Kubelík Conducting Chair'. In April 2024, the orchestra announced that Bychkov is to stand down as its chief conductor and music director at the close of the 2027–2028 season. In June 2025, the orchestra announced the appointment of Hrůša as its next chief conductor and music director, effective with the 2028–2029 season, with an initial contract of five seasons.

The Czech Philharmonic's first phonograph recording dates from 1929, when Václav Talich recorded My Country for the British His Master's Voice label. The orchestra recordings were historically released on the Supraphon label.

== Czech Philharmonic Wind Ensemble ==
The Czech Philharmonic Wind Ensemble (also known historically as the Czech Philharmonic Harmony) was founded in 1967 by principal wind players of the Czech Philharmonic under the patronage of chief conductor Karel Ančerl. Originally formed as a classical wind octet, the ensemble later expanded its instrumentation and repertoire, covering works from the Baroque period through to contemporary music. It recorded extensively for the Supraphon label and appeared at major European festivals including the Prague Spring Festival.

Following a period of reduced activity in the late 20th century, wind chamber formations associated with the Czech Philharmonic have continued to perform and record within the orchestra’s wider chamber music programming.

Since 2013, conductor and producer Shea Lolin has collaborated with members of the Czech Philharmonic wind section on a number of recording projects focused on wind and woodwind orchestra repertoire. These include the commercially released album Twisted Skyscape (2015), produced with the Czech Philharmonic Wind Ensemble. The project has been noted in promotional materials as part of a broader effort to develop and promote repertoire for woodwind orchestra and related chamber formations.

== Honours and awards ==
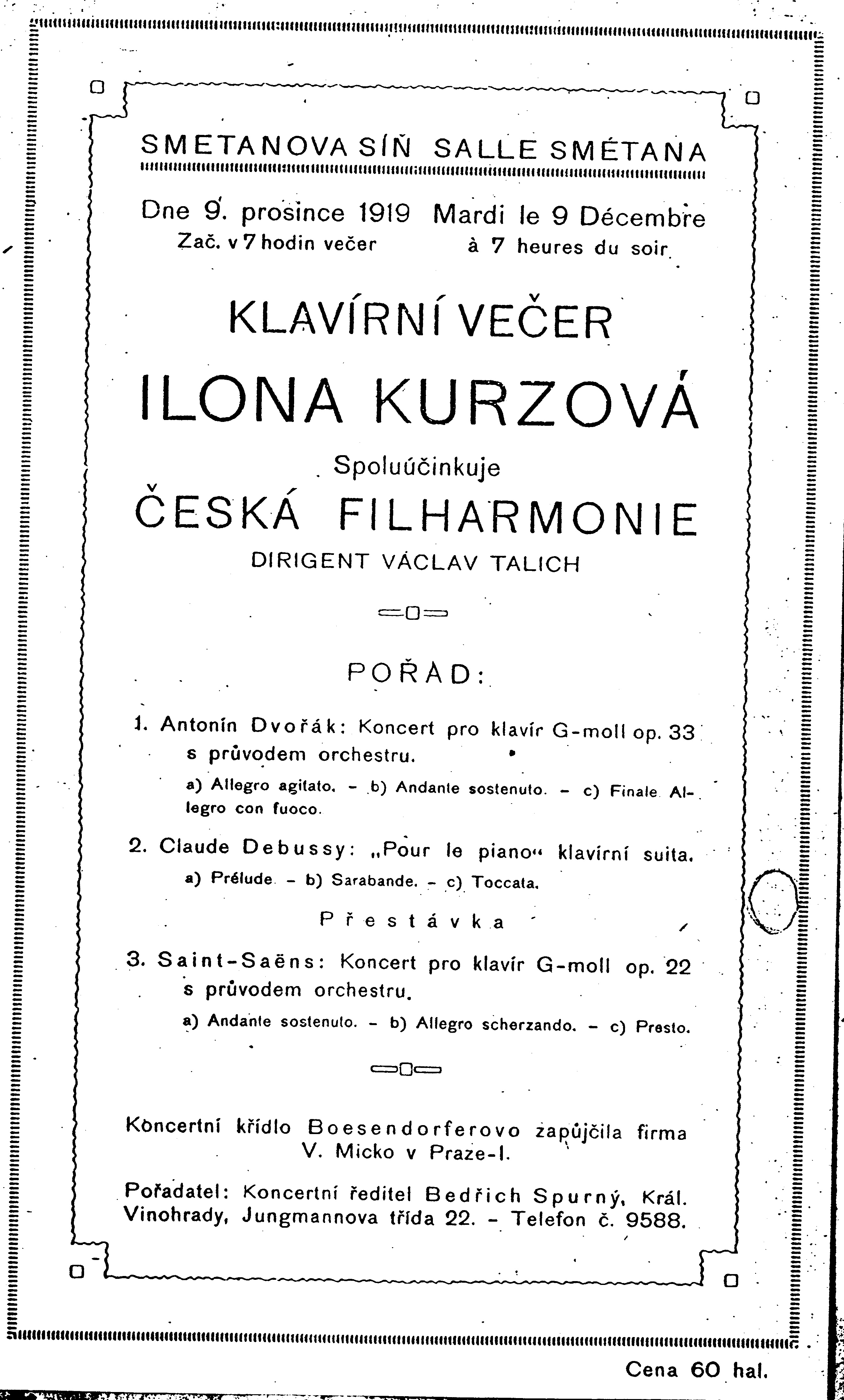
Programme including Antonín Dvořák's Piano Concerto in G minor, Op. 33, Czech Philharmonic conducted by Václav Talich

The Czech Philharmonic has won many awards, ten Grand Prix du Disque de l'Académie Charles Cros, five Grand Prix du disque de l'Académie française and several Cannes Classical Awards. The Czech Philharmonic was nominated for Grammy Awards in 2005, and also two Wiener Flötenuhr awards, with Pavel Štěpán, Zdeněk Mácal and Václav Neumann (1971 and 1982). It was voted 20th place of the top 20 best orchestras in the world in a 2008 survey by Gramophone magazine.

In 2024, the orchestra was named Orchestra of the Year by Gramophone magazine, and in 2025 it received the BBC Music Magazine Orchestral Award for its recording of Má vlast, released by Pentatone in March 2024.

== Chief conductors ==
- Ludvík Čelanský (1901–1902)
- Vilém Zemánek (1903–1918)
- Václav Talich (1919–1931, 1933–1941)
- Rafael Kubelík (1942–1948)
- Karel Šejna (1950)
- Karel Ančerl (1950–1968)
- Václav Neumann (1968–1990)
- Jiří Bělohlávek (1990–1992)
- Gerd Albrecht (1993–1996)
- Vladimír Válek (1996-1998)
- Vladimir Ashkenazy (1998–2003)
- Zdeněk Mácal (2003–2007)
- Eliahu Inbal (2009–2012)
- Jiří Bělohlávek (2012–2017)
- Semyon Bychkov (2018–present)
- Jakub Hrůša (designate, effective 2028)
