= Barkouf =

Opéra-bouffe by Jacques Offenbach

Jacques Offenbach by Nadar, c. 1860s

Barkouf is an opéra bouffe in three acts premiered in 1860 with music composed by Jacques Offenbach to a French libretto by Eugène Scribe and Henry Boisseaux, after Abbé Blanchet, the fourth of his Contes Orientaux entitled Barkouf et Mani. The title role is a dog. It was the first work by the composer to be performed at the Opéra-Comique in Paris, but after its initial performances was not performed again until 2018.

== Background ==
Having found success with one-act pieces and the longer works at the Bouffes-Parisiens, Barkouf was Offenbach's first attempt to enter the repertoire of one of the major Paris operas houses, the Opéra-Comique, which was to culminate in Les Contes d'Hoffmann in 1881. Commissioned by the house, it aroused hostility from singers during rehearsal and critics at the premiere. The new head of the Opéra-Comique, Alfred Beaumont, took up post in June 1860 and hoped to deploy Offenbach's burgeoning fame by coupling him with the famous librettist Eugene Scribe. The latter had a libretto sketched out on the subject which was intended for Clapisson, as a vehicle for Delphine Ugalde, and Scribe's younger collaborator Boisseaux set to work to complete the elder man's plan. By mid-August the Paris papers had announced that the work (at that point called Le Sultan Barkouf) had been cast and rehearsals had begun. Some of the principals were outraged that Offenbach had been allowed to compose for France's second most important stage, and Ugalde led the criticism. There followed problems with the censor, which while noting that the "strange" piece took place in a land of fantasy and make-believe, objected to the reference that the vice-roys of Lahore were being defenestrated and banned the opera. Beaumont interceded with the censor and managed to get away with changing references to terms such as 'sovereign' and 'master' to less specific descriptions. With these and other minor changes and swayed by Beaumont insistence that cancellation would cost his new administration too much, the censor passed the work. The withdrawal of Ugalde, to be replaced as Maïma first by Mlle de Saint-Urbain, then when she became ill, by Mlle Marimon, all of which delayed rehearsals further. The work was eventually performed at the second Salle Favart, the home of the Opéra-Comique, on 24, 26, 28, 31 December 1860, 2, 10, 12, and 16 January 1861, with several changes of cast. Yon feels that the audience reaction was good and the lack of commitment from the cast should not be over-estimated; it was the violence of the critical reaction which prevented a lasting success for Barkouf.

Along with Scudo and Duchene, Berlioz was especially critical, attacking Offenbach's craftsmanship and questioning the 'twisted' minds of 'certain musicians', and the introduction of 'bouffe' elements at the Opéra-Comique while stating that he never set foot in such theatres. In his Dictionnaire des opéras of 1869, Félix Clément noted the light and ingenious construction of two or three choral movements, but was otherwise disappointed by the lack of originality shown by the composer. Modern views have tended to challenge this view; the conductor of the Strasbourg revival claims that Barkouf is "an important work... an opera to be counted among the greatest successes of its composer" and that the 100 minutes of music in Barkouf are worthy of enthusiastic support. Some of the music was re-used in Boule-de-neige of 1871, substituting a bear for the dog in the title-role.

After closing in early 1861 the work was not revived until December 2018, when the Opéra du Rhin staged it in Strasbourg on the 7th of December, conducted by Jacques Lacombe and directed by Mariame Clément, who rewrote much of the spoken dialogue.

Most of Offenbach's manuscript survived within a branch of his descendants, and the missing pages were tracked down by Jean-Christophe Keck in other collections. The surviving libretti, however, did not correspond to the score. While allowing for the constant changes during the rehearsal period, orchestral and repetiteur materials were probably destroyed in the fire at the Opéra-Comique in 1887. Offenbach had gained certain respect from his peers, so long as he stayed in the genre of the Bouffes-Parisiens, but in the score of Barkouf he wrote in a more complex vein, with modern harmonies and complicated part-writing while remaining with the spirit of opéra-bouffe. Keck notes the striking numbers of the lyrical duet which closes the first act, surprising harmonies in the conspiracy scene, and the drinking song in Act 3. Given the experimental nature of parts of the music, the reaction of the critics is understandable, with sophisticated modulations, even short polytonal passages, and demanding and unusual vocal writing; Keck writes that the composer had never pushed his musical language so far, and would not go further – until Les Contes d'Hoffmann. Offenbach's Orphée aux enfers (1858/1874) includes a barked role, Cerbère (Cerberus).

== Roles ==
Role	Voice type	Premiere cast, 24 December 1860 (Conductor: Jacques Offenbach)
Bababeck, Grand Vizier of the Great Mogul of Lahore	Tenor	Sainte-Foy
The Great Mogul	Bass	Nathan
Saëb, an officer	Tenor	Victor Warot
Kaliboul, eunuch	Tenor	Lemaire
Xaïloum, in love with Balkis	Tenor	Berthelier
Maïma, a young flower vendor	Soprano	Marie Marimon
Balkis, an orange vendor	Mezzo-soprano	Emma Bélia
Périzade, Bababeck's daughter	Soprano	
Chorus: merchants, citizens, servants, soldiers, guards, attendants to Périzade, courtiers

== Synopsis ==
=== Act 1 ===
Market day in (a mythical) Lahore. The two market vendors Maïma and Balkis tout their wares. Bababeck, the corrupt cupbearer of the incumbent governor, flirts with the young women. He is a widower and already a bit older, but imagines himself to be attractive and yearns for the day when, having married off his unattractive daughter Périzade, he will be able to devote himself entirely to a life as a bachelor. From nearby, the sound of an uprising fills the air. Bababeck, suspecting the worse, hurries to his house across from the palace. Balkis is concerned about her beloved, Xaïloum, who never misses out on a provocation, and whom she presumes to be among the insurgents. Maïma also expresses her worries, and tells Balkis about the sad loss of her beloved, Saëb, and of her faithful dog, Barkouf, who were both abducted some time ago by army recruiters. Meanwhile, yet another governor has been thrown out of the window. In this way, the exploited and tormented population obtains some regular breathing space, but with the result that the successor appointed by the Great Mogul usually rules the province in an even more draconian manner than his predecessor. Among the insurgents is, as presumed, Xaïloum, who took out his anger by demolishing Bababeck's residence and therefore, upon the Great Mogul's arrival in the rebellious city, has to hide from the militia.

Instead of appointing Bababeck to be the new governor, as Bababeck had hoped and expected, the Great Mogul decides to lay down the law and spontaneously makes his dog the new head of the Lahore's government. Bababeck is promoted to the rank of vizier, and is charged with promptly implementing the laws and decrees of the dog governor, otherwise he, Bababeck, can expect to be severely punished. Maïma almost swoons when she not only recognizes the missing Saëb as a soldier in the Great Mogul's guards, but also her Barkouf as the Great Mogul's now enthroned governor!

=== Act 2 ===
Bababeck worries that his future son-in-law – the unfortunate Saëb, as quickly becomes apparent – will refuse the hand of his daughter as soon as he sees her, and therefore orders Périzade to receive Saëb only with a veil covering her face. Périzade, who is no longer a spring chicken, wants to know from her father how, after years of searching and rejections, he now has found a suitor who will marry her. The explanation is simple: Bababeck has evidence that Saëb's father planned an attack on the previous governor, and is blackmailing him with it. The marriage between Saëb and Périzade is the price for Bababeck's pledge of secrecy. In order to save his father, Saëb has accepted his fate without knowing his future wife. Now, for the consummation of the marriage, only the written and verbal approval of the new governor is necessary. However, Bababeck's servant Kaliboul, who was sent to Barkouf to have the marriage contract ratified, becomes terrified by the fear of being mauled to death by Barkouf and returns white as a sheet and empty-handed. The postponement is a disappointment for Périzade and Bababeck, and a huge relief for Saëb, who after years of separation can only think of one thing: his lost Maïma.

Maïma comes to the palace and demands to be brought before the new governor. Bababeck recognizes the lovely young girl from the market and does not turn her away. Maïma is able to allay his concern that Barkouf will immediately tear her to pieces, for years earlier they were the best of friends, and he literally ate out of her hand. Bababeck seizes the opportunity and reveals his brilliant plan to Maïma. He will officially make her Barkouf's chamber secretary and exclusive translator, since she is the only one whom Barkouf allows to come near him and can understand his barking. Bababeck's own decisions, proclaimed by Maïma, can in this manner be sold to the populace as decrees by Governor Barkouf, without anybody seeing through the deception. Maïma immediately understands the intrigue and consents to the proposal of a secret co-regency with Bababeck.

She immediately goes to Barkouf's chambers. To Bababeck's satisfaction, and to the astonishment of the court, the dog becomes delirious with joy at the sight of her and instead of attacking her, indulges in demonstrations of love toward his former mistress. As proof of his devotion, Maïma brings back the marriage document "signed" by Barkouf, not realizing that she has made herself instigator of Saëb's marriage to Périzade. Bababeck triumphs and opens the general audience. A delegation of citizens from Lahore presents a petition in which a reduction of the tax burden is urged since the populace is being crushed by the tributes. Maïma goes to Barkouf and then "translates" his barked answer – however not, as Bababeck whispers into her ear, as a rejection of the request, but rather as assent. The seething Bababeck still thinks it could be a misunderstanding, but he is proven wrong by the next petition – it is a plea for clemency for Xaïloum, who has been sentenced to death. For Maïma again "translates" Barkouf's woof as the opposite of Bababeck's decree, namely Xaïloum's pardon. While the people cheer the wise and lenient ruler, Bababeck slowly realizes that he has become the victim of his own intrigue. He plots revenge.

Maïma's elation turns to gloom when she sees Saëb at Périzade's hand with the marriage witnesses on the way to the governor, for the governor's verbal permission for the marriage of the vizier's daughter is still pending. Maïma does not know about the agreement between the fathers and has to assume that Saëb has broken the vow of fidelity made to her years earlier. Bababeck cannot prevent Maïma from "translating" a third time against his interests. Barkouf revokes the previously granted consent for Saëb and Périzade's wedding – his fierce barking allows no doubt, and Maïma translates it accordingly.

=== Act 3 ===
There remains only one way to put a stop to Maïma's uncontrolled actions: the governor 'himself' must be done away with. A group of conspirators around Bababeck and the meanwhile out-of-work court flunkeys make plans to poison Barkouf. Simultaneously, contact is established with the Tatars who are encamped before the city, which has become easy prey after the Great Mogul's withdrawal of the military to take part in a foray in another province. The freed Xaïloum becomes a witness to the conspiracy, having slipped into the seraglio to see his beloved Balkis, who moved into the palace with Maïma. However, having understood only every other word, he can give Maïma only a very inexact report. Maïma, who has meanwhile been able to speak with Saëb and now knows the reasons for his forced marriage, is forewarned. She sets a trap for the conspirators. During the evening banquet, poison is put into Barkouf's wine. However Maïma, in the name of the governor, calls upon the conspirators to drink to his health from the same wine, by which means the coup is revealed. At this very moment, the Tatars charge into the city. The people take up arms and, led by Barkouf and Saëb, charge off to confront the enemy. The Great Mogul, returning from his foray, can only legitimize the new circumstances: the marriage of the wise Maïma with the brave Saëb. However, Barkouf has been killed in battle, and therefore Saëb is promoted in his place. The new governor is hailed by the people.

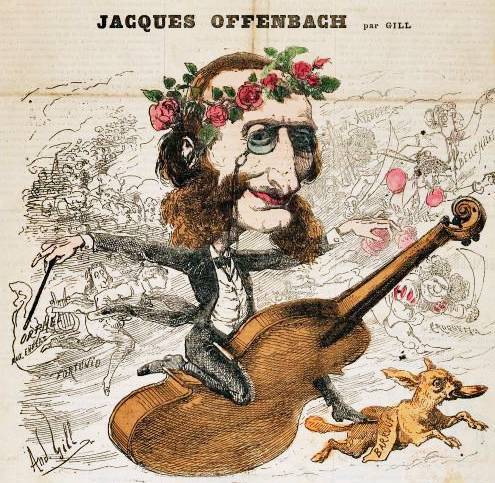
Offenbach by André Gill, 1866, with Barkouf in the bottom right
