= Henryk Jarecki =

Polish composer

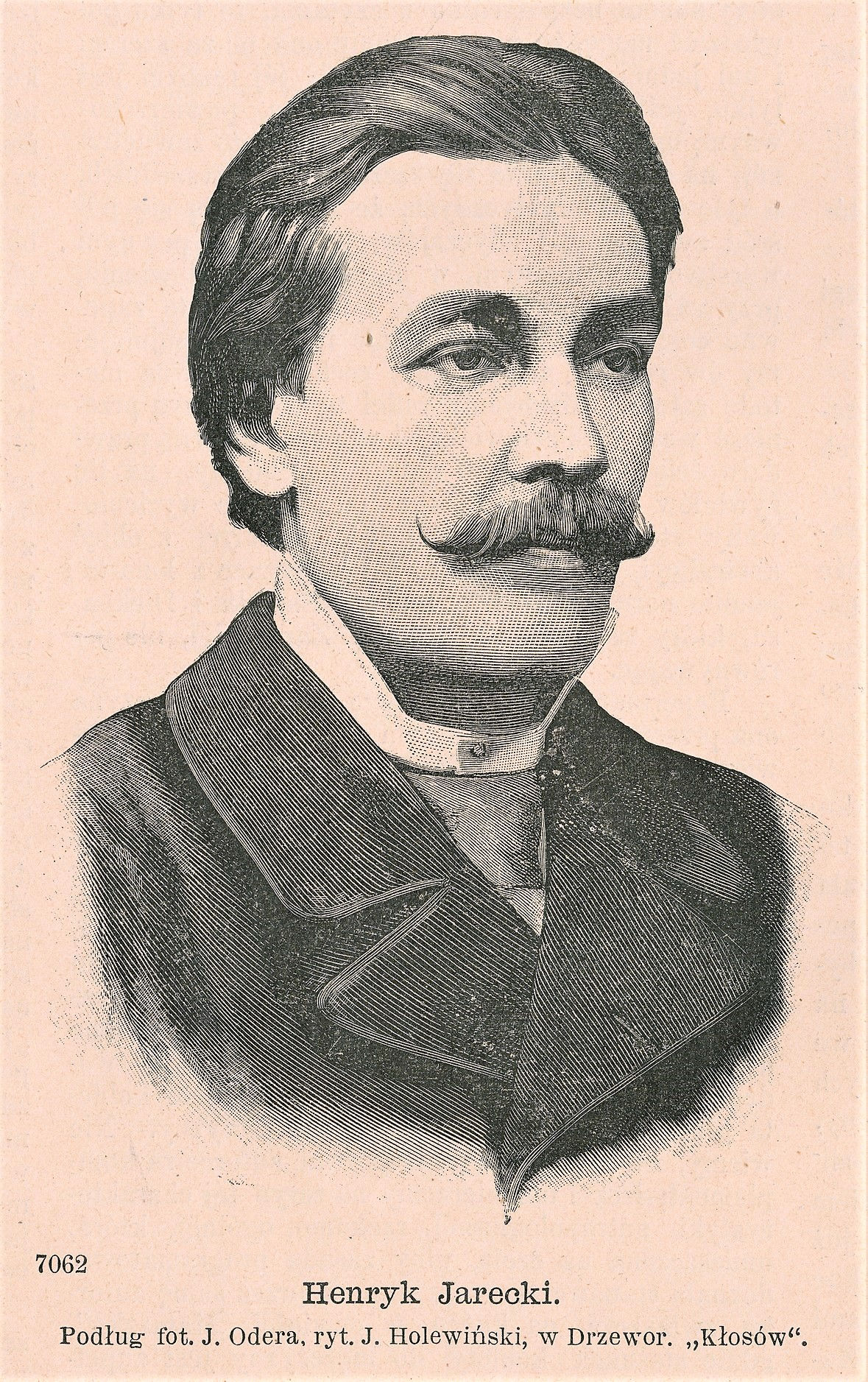
Henryk Jarecki

Henryk Jarecki (6 December 1846 – 18 December 1918) was a Polish composer, conductor and teacher.

== Sources ==
- Wąsowska, Elżbieta (1993). PWM Encyclopedia of Music (in Polish). Vol. 4. Krakow: PWM. ISBN 83-224-0453-0. OCLC 180641615.
