= Luhanske, Bakhmut Raion, Donetsk Oblast =

Urban locality in Donetsk Oblast, Ukraine

Luhanske Луганське
- Rural settlement
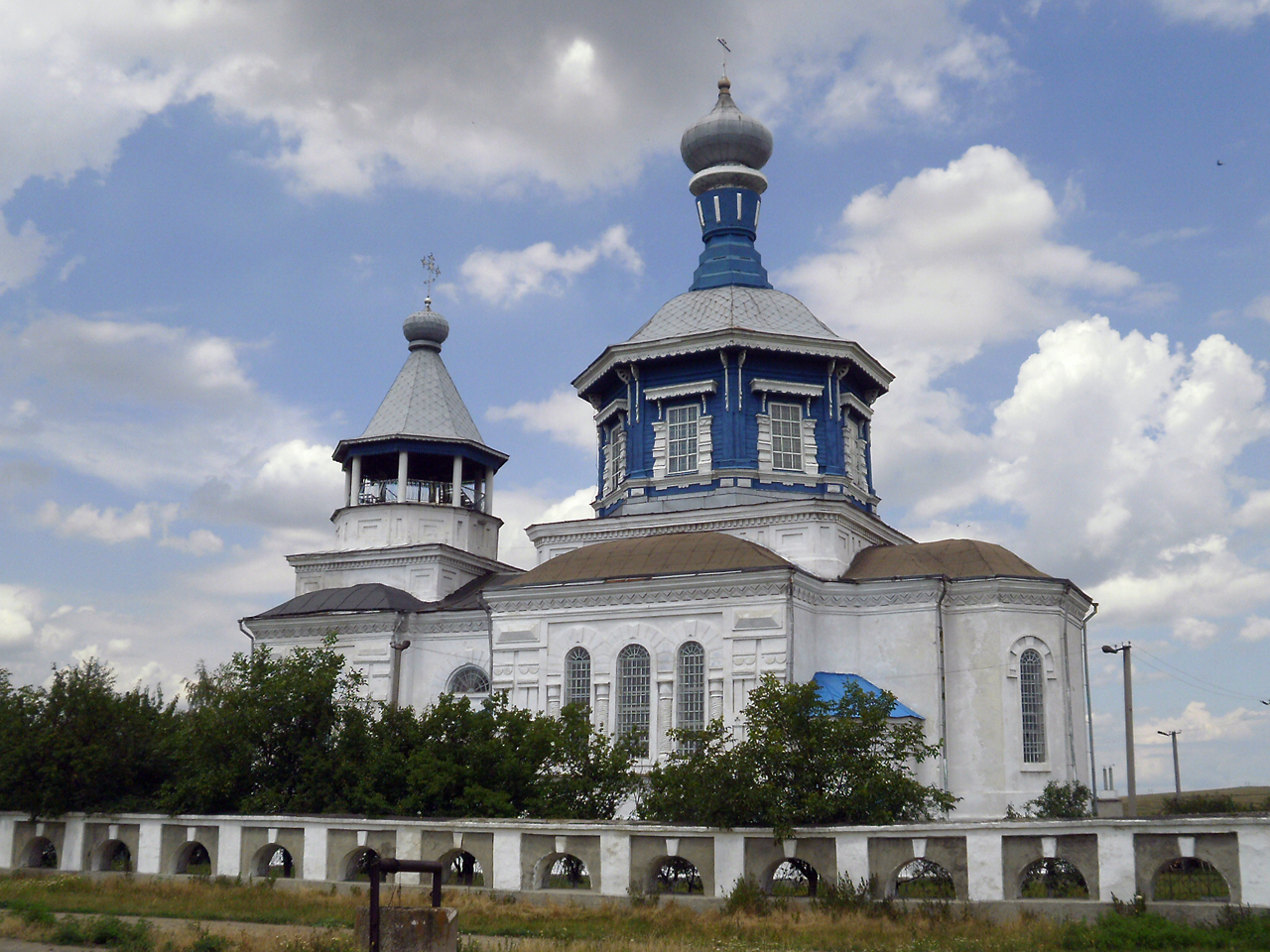
- Church of the Intercession (1898) in Luhanske

- Location of Luhanske within Ukraine Luhanske (Ukraine)
- Coordinates: 48°26′29″N 38°15′14″E
- Country: Ukraine
- Oblast: Donetsk Oblast
- Raion: Bakhmut Raion
- Hromada: Svitlodarsk urban hromada
- Founded: 1701
- Incorporated: 1938

Area
  - Total: 1.433 km^{2} (0.553 sq mi)

Population (2022)
  - Total: 2,140
  - Density: 1,490/km^{2} (3,870/sq mi)
- Postal code: 84580-84581
- Area code: +380 6274

Luhanske (Ukrainian: Луганське; Russian: Луганское, romanized: Luganskoye) is a rural settlement in Bakhmut Raion, Donetsk Oblast, eastern Ukraine. It is located on the M04 highway, about 30 kilometres (19 mi) from Bakhmut. The population of Luhanske was 2,140 (2022 estimate).

The settlement has been damaged by and is on the frontline of the War in Donbas. The UNHCR reported in February 2017 that it was inhabited by a "handful of elderly residents". The settlement was controlled by the Ukrainian army, from 2014 until the 2022 Russian invasion of Ukraine It was captured by Russia in May 2022, and remains under their control.

== Demographics ==
As of the 2001 Ukrainian census, Luhanske had a population of 2,612 inhabitants. The linguistic composition of the settlement was as follows:

First languages in Luhanske
	percent
Ukrainian	81.8%
Russian	15.8%
Armenian	0.4%
Belarusian	0.1%
others	1.9%
