= Dudaryk (choir) =

Ukrainian choir

The Lviv State Academic male choir "Dudaryk" (Ukrainian: Львівська державна академічна чоловіча хорова капела «Дударик») is a Ukrainian choir founded October 17, 1971, by the Ukrainian music and choir society. The choir is a Shevchenko National Prize laureate.

== History ==
The founder and chief conductor of the choir was Honored Artist of Ukraine - Mykola Katsal. He was born on December 10, 1940, in Grechany, Podillia. Katsal graduated from Lviv Polytechnic Institute (geodesy), Music College and Conservatory.

In 1977, 6 years after the founding, Dudaryk was already among the finalists at the festival of art groups in the Soviet Union. As an amateur the group existed until 1989. Thanks to the efforts of Mykola Katsal and his colleagues Lubov Katsal and Lesia Chaikivska, in 1989 the first boys choir school in Ukraine - "Dudaryk" was established.

In 2020 President of Ukraine Volodymyr Zelenskyy granted national status to the choir.

Since its founding Dudaryk gave over 1500 concerts in prestigious concert halls and churches of Ukraine and worldwide, including Carnegie Hall - U.S., Duomo - Lithuania, Notre Dame de Paris - France, Vancouver-Pacific International festival Canada Place and many others.

== Awards ==
- The honorary title "People's Choir" (1977).
- Diploma of the Supreme Soviet of Ukraine (1987).
- Shevchenko National Prize, (1989) ( the only youth art group in Ukraine).
- Honorary title State Choir (2000).
- Honorary title State Academic Choir (2010).

== Festivals ==
- 1978, 1981, 1987, 1991 - member of international choral festivals in Estonia and Latvia
- 1987, 1989 - member of international choral festivals in Hungary
- 1990 - 57 concerts in U.S. and Canada
- 1991 - 2003, participant of international festivals in Poland, Switzerland, France and Belgium
