= Rylsky Institute of Art Studies, Folklore and Ethnology =

Ukrainian research institute

Coordinates: 50.4509°N 30.5286°E

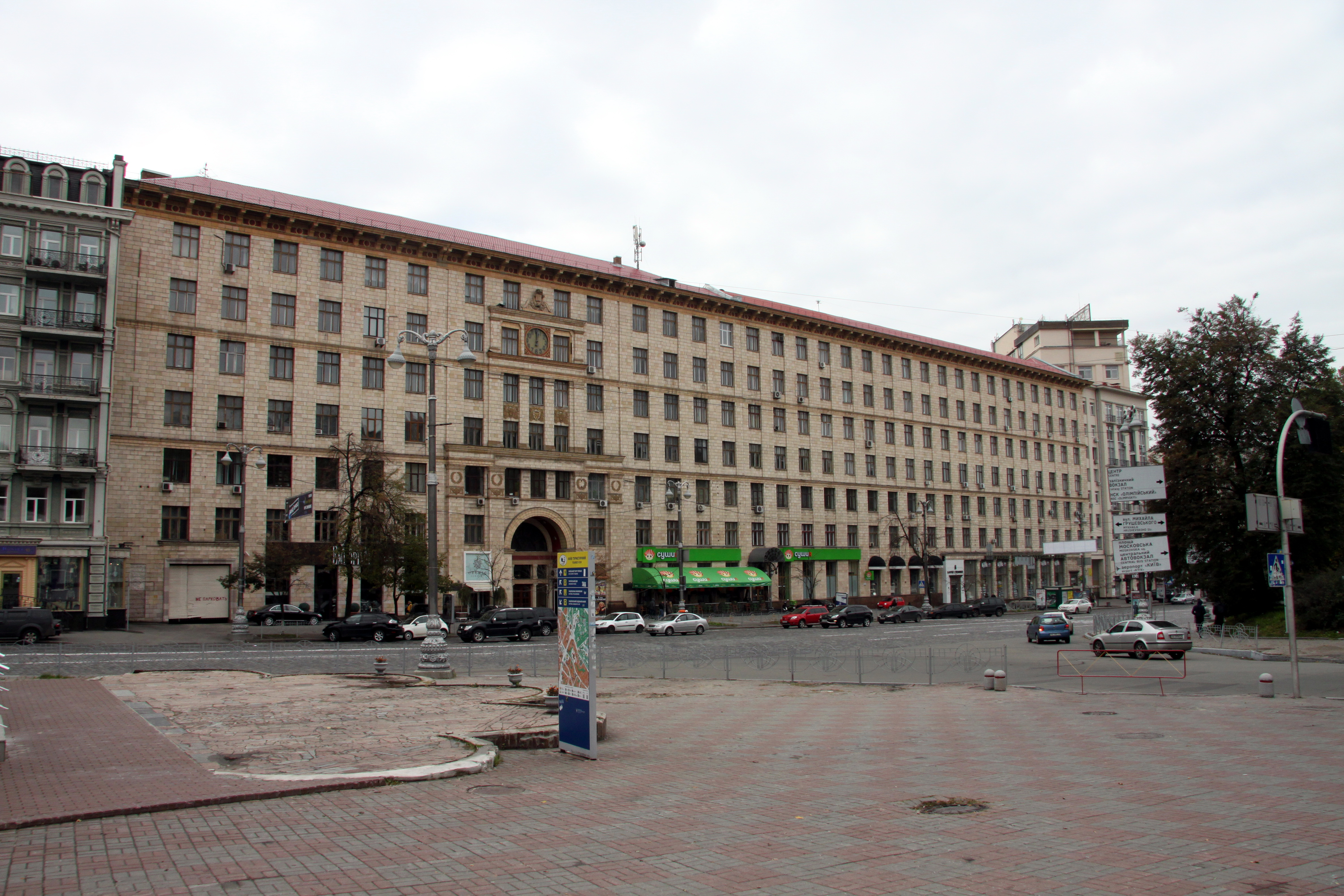
Rylsky Institute of Art Studies, Folklore and Ethnology

The Rylsky Institute of Art Studies, Folklore and Ethnology (IAFE; Ukrainian: Інститут мистецтвознавства, фольклористики та етнології ім. М. Т. Рильського, Instytut mystetsvoznavstva, folklorystyky ta etnolohiyi imeni M. T. Ryl’s’koho) is a research institute in Kyiv, Ukraine, established in August 1936.

== History ==
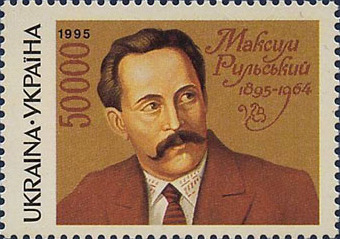
A postage stamp, featuring Maksym Rylsky

The Institute takes its origin from a number of art and ethnographic centres that emerged during the 1920s. Thus, in 1921 the Ukrainian SSR Academy of Sciences established the Ethnographic Commission (1921–1933), which played a leading role in preservation and development of ethnographic and folkloristic sciences in Ukraine. The Vovk Centre of Anthropology and Ethnology [also known as the Vovk Museum [or Cabinet] of Anthropology and Ethnology] (1921–1934), named after Fedir Vovk, oversaw the anthropological and ethnographic research studies of the entire territory of Ukraine. A separate research institution was entirely dedicated to studies of Ukrainian folk music: The Centre of Music Ethnography [also known as Cabinet] (1922–1935).

In 1936 the Ukrainian Folklore Institute was established under the umbrella of the Ukrainian SSR Academy of Sciences. At that time it consisted of the Narrative Folklore Department, the Folk Music Department, and Archives. Its Lviv branch was established in 1939, with Filaret Kolessa as its first director.

In 1964, the Institute was named after Maksym Rylsky, who was its long-standing director (1942–1964).

The Institute was given its current name in 1994.

== Departments and centres ==
The Institute is a leading research institution in Ukraine of ethnographical, historical and cultural studies of the country. Its research topics include culture of the ethnic minorities of Ukraine, theory of fine art and folklore history, ethnic and foreign culture and art, history and theory of folklore studies, and others. The Institute has one centre and four main departments:

- Centre of Ukrainian Ethnology
- Department of Fine and Decorative Art
- Department of Ukrainian and Foreign Folklore
- Department of Musicology and Ethnomusicology
- Department of Screen and Stage Performing Arts and Cultural Studies

== Selected publications ==
The institute has published books and periodicals that present rare and unique materials in their field. The periodicals are

- ‘Матеріали до української етнології’ (est. 1995) [Materyaly do ukrayins’koyi etnolohiyi, Materials on Ukrainian Ethnology]
- ‘Слов'янський світ’ (est. 1997) [Slovyans’kyj svit, Slavic World]
- ‘Студії мистецтвознавчі’ (est. 2002) [Studiyi mystetstvoznavchi, Fine Art Studies]
- ‘Українське мистецтвознавство’ (est. 2004) [Ukrayins’ke mystetsvoznavstvo, Ukrainian Art Studies]
- ‘Народна творчість та етнологія’ (est. 2010) [Narodna tvorchist’ ta etnolohiya, Folklore and Ethnology]
- ‘Наукові студії ІМФЕ’ (est. 2012) [Naukovi studiyi IMFE, Review of IAFE Studies]

== IAFE library and archives ==
The Library’s current collection consists of approximately 119,100 volumes, mostly on ethnography, folklore, fine art, musicology, theatre and cinematography studies, as well as related topics (demography, history, cultural studies and literature) and so on. The collection includes some unique and rare editions.

The Department of Archival Research Collections, Manuscripts and Phonographic Records consists of 65 collections of approximately 24,000 items. The collections span the 19th-21st centuries.

== See also ==
The 13th European International Scientific Conference of Folk Culture “Roots and Routes of Traditional European Cultures in XXI Century (July, 2013)

IAFE Ethnographic Conference in Kyiv (October, 2012)

The 35th International Ballad Conference SIEF (July, 2005)
