= Kelsey Lauritano =

American mezzo-soprano

- Born: San Francisco, California, U.S.
- Education: Juilliard School
- Occupation: Operatic mezzo-soprano
- Organizations: Oper Frankfurt
- Awards: Marilyn Horne Song Competition
- Website: www.kelseylauritano.com

Kelsey Lauritano is an American operatic mezzo-soprano. After winning the 2018 Marilyn Horne Song Competition, she made an international career in opera and concert, based at the Oper Frankfurt. She has performed leading roles, especially breeches roles such as Cherubino in Mozart's Le nozze di Figaro, Paolo in Mercadante's Francesca da Rimini and Fragoletto in Offenbach's Die Banditen.

== Life and career ==
Born in San Francisco, Lauritano studied at the Juilliard School in New York City, graduating with a master's degree. The school awarded her the Peter Mennin Prize "for outstanding achievement and leadership in music". While at Juilliard, she appeared in Rameau's Hippolyte et Aricie and in the title role of Ravel's L'enfant et les sortileges. She received a prize at the Metropolitan Opera National Council Auditions, and was awarded a scholarship by President Barack Obama in 2012.

Lauritano performed the role of Cherubino in Mozart's Le nozze di Figaro first at the Music Academy of the West, conducted by James Conlon. She appeared as Venus in Monteverdi's Il ballo delle Ingrate, conducted by William Christie. She performed at festivals including the Boston Early Music Festival, Virginia Arts Festival, the Opera Theatre of Saint Louis, and the New York Festival of Song at Lincoln Center.

She won the 2018 Marilyn Horne Song Competition, which comes with international recitals. One of them was in 2019 at National Sawdust with pianist Andrew Sun, including Schubert songs, Ravel's Histoires naturelles, Ricky Ian Gordon's Without Music and Manuel da Falla's Siete canciones populares españolas. A reviewer noted her focused sound "of clear amber color, rich without heaviness", able to communicate in small vocal inflections, portraying Ravel's animals: "the smooth confidence of the peacock, the fleeting wit of the cricket, the grace of the swan".

Lauritano moved to the studio of the Oper Frankfurt, making her European debut in the 2018/19 season as the Third Dryad in Dvořák's Rusalka. She became a member of the ensemble two years later. She performed the role of the lover Paolo in the revival of Mercadante's Francesca da Rimini, with the German premiere on February 26, 2023, in Frankfurt, alongside Jessica Pratt in the title role. A reviewer noted her light but expressive voice and vivid action. She appeared as Cherubino in the opening performance of the 2023/24 season, conducted by Thomas Guggeis. A reviewer from the FAZ noted that she portrayed the adolescent young man "tending towards petulance, not with a velvety mezzotone, but with an almost metallic-brittle approach that spreads androgynous infatuation towards the end of the breathless 'Non so più'" aria. A reviewer form Online Merker in Vienna added that she "flits past like a whirlwind, a restless spook". In 2024, she performed as Fragoletto, a farmer who turns bandit for love, in Offenbach's Die Banditen, conducted by Karsten Januschke and directed by Katharina Thoma. She portrayed Dorabella in Mozart's Così fan tutte in 2025, conducted by Guggeis and staged by Mariame Clément.
