= Orion Weiss =

American pianist

Orion Weiss (born November 8, 1981) is an American classical pianist.

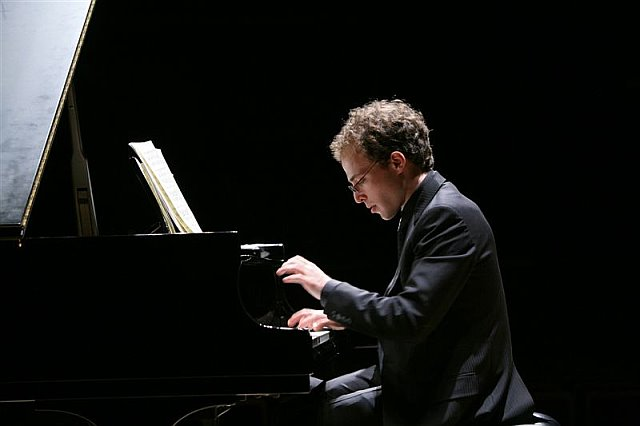
Orion Weiss

== Academia ==
Weiss began his musical studies at the Preucil School of Music in Iowa City, Iowa. When his family moved to Lyndhurst, Ohio, he continued his piano studies with Carol Lubetkin, and later with pianist and composer Edith Reed.

He attended the Interlochen Arts Camp between 1991 and 1995. Between 1995 and 2000 he studied with Paul Schenly, Reinberger Chair in Piano and Head of the Piano Department at the Cleveland Institute of Music. During these years, he attended summer music festivals and workshops at Pianofest in the Hamptons, the Sergei Babayan International Piano Academy, the Perlman Music Program, and Music Academy of the West. In 2004 he graduated from the Juilliard School in New York earning a Bachelor of Music degree. At Juilliard, he studied with Emanuel Ax.

Weiss has participated regularly in a teaching residency for gifted young musicians in Medellin, Colombia.

== Career ==
In February 1999, Weiss made his Cleveland Orchestra debut performing Liszt's Piano Concerto No. 1.

In March 1999, with less than 24 hours' notice, Weiss stepped in to replace André Watts for a performance of Shostakovich's Piano Concerto No. 2 with the Baltimore Symphony Orchestra. He was immediately invited to return to the Orchestra for a performance of the Tchaikovsky Piano Concerto in October 1999.

Weiss was featured in the 2004 edition of Musical America and the March 2004 Symphony Magazine as part of the next generation of great artists in classical music. He has performed with numerous orchestras such as the Los Angeles Philharmonic, Chicago Symphony, New World Symphony, Vancouver Symphony, Philadelphia Orchestra, Cleveland Orchestra, and the New York Philharmonic. He made his New York recital debut at Alice Tully Hall in April 2005. That same year, he made his European debut in a recital at the Musée du Louvre in Paris.

Also in 2005, he toured Israel with the Israel Philharmonic Orchestra, conducted by Itzhak Perlman. He toured the US with the Orchester der Klangverwaltung Munich conducted by Enoch zu Guttenberg in October 2007. He toured China with the Pittsburgh Symphony in May 2009.

In 2010, he was featured in a recording project of the complete Gershwin works for piano and orchestra with the Buffalo Philharmonic and JoAnn Falletta.

In the summer of 2011, Weiss made his debut with the Boston Symphony Orchestra at Tanglewood. He performed with the San Francisco Symphony, Orpheus Chamber Orchestra, Lucerne Festival, the Denver Friends of Chamber Music, the Kennedy Center's Fortas Series, and the 92nd Street Y, and at the Aspen, Bard, Ravinia, and Grand Teton summer festivals.

As a recitalist and chamber musician, Weiss has appeared across the United States at venues and festivals from, among many, the Lincoln Center for the Performing Arts to the Seattle Chamber Music Society, to the Carnegie Hall Weill Recital Hall with Itzhak Perlman in a benefit for the Perlman Music Program. He was a member of the Chamber Music Society Two program of the Chamber Music Society of Lincoln Center from 2002 to 2004, which included his appearance in the opening concert of the Society's 2002–03 season at Alice Tully Hall with Shai Wosner. In addition, Weiss has performed duo-piano recitals with, among others, Emanuel Ax. Weiss described his preparation for recitals in a 2006 profile in International Piano.

Weiss made his recital debut at the Kennedy Center in Washington D.C. in January 2012. He joined the Pacifica Quartet at the Casals Festival in Puerto Rico in the spring of 2012. He still tours regularly with the Chamber Music Society of Lincoln Center. Known for his affinity for chamber music, Weiss performs regularly with violinists Augustin Hadelich, William Hagen, Benjamin Beilman, James Ehnes, and Arnaud Sussman; pianist Shai Wosner; cellist Julie Albers; and the Ariel, Parker, and Pacifica Quartets.

In 2018, Weiss self-released Presentiment, a recording that explores the omens and anxiety of the tense world leading up to the first World War with music by Granados, Janáček, and Scriabin.

== Personal life ==
Orion Weiss was married to the pianist Anna Polonsky, with whom he performed two-piano concertos with orchestra (most recently the Columbus symphony), as well as collaborating in duo-piano and four-hand recitals, including Chamber Music Northwest, Seattle Chamber Music Festival, Camerata Pacifica, Barge Music, Bay Chamber Concerts and the Bard Music Festival. The two had a daughter together. They were divorced in 2019. Weiss is remarried, to Shirley Gherson, with whom he has a son.

== Awards and recognitions ==
- 1999 Gilmore Young Artist Award
- 2001 Mieczyslaw Munz Award at the Juilliard School
- 2002 Avery Fisher Career Grant
- 2002, 2003 Gina Bachauer Scholarship at the Juilliard School
- 2005 Juilliard William Petschek Award
- 2010 Classical Recording Foundation's Young Artist of the Year
- 2019 Andrew Wolf Chamber Music Award

== Recordings ==
- Works for piano and cello by Rachmaninoff, Beethoven, Schumann with cellist Julie Albers (Artek Records, 2005), Artek AR-0022-2
- J.S. Bach, Scriabin, Mozart, Carter (Yarlung Records, 2008), Audiophile digital recording
- Gershwin: Concerto in F; Rhapsody No. 2; I Got Rhythm Variations – Orion Weiss, piano; Buffalo Philharmonic Orchestra, JoAnn Falletta, conductor (Naxos American Classics 8.559705), audio-only Blu-ray, CD
- Orion Weiss Plays J.S. Bach, Scriabin, Mozart & Carter (Yarlung Records, 2011)
- Johannes Brahms: Sonatas for violin and piano (Telos Music, 2012)
- 42 Bartok Bagatelles, Dvorak Humoresques, Prokofiev Visions Fugitives (Bridge Records, Inc 2012)
- Gershwin: Rhapsody in Blue; Strike up the Band Overture; Promenade; Catfish Row (Naxos, 2013)
- Domenico Scarlatti: Complete Keyboard Sonatas, Vol. 15 (Naxos, 2014)
- Christopher Rouse: Seeing; Kabir Padavali (Naxos, 2015)
- Presentiment (Orion Weiss, 2018)
- Piano Protagonists: Music for Piano & Orchestra (Bridge, 2021)
- Arc III: Brahms, Schubert, Debussy, Dohnányi, Ligeti, Talma (First Hand Records, 2025)
