= Hewgill =

Hewgill is a surname. Notable people with the surname include:

- Catherine Hewgill (born 1963), Australian cellist
- Roland Hewgill (1929–1998), Canadian actor
