= Karsten Januschke =

German conductor

- Born: Karsten Januschke; 4 March 1980 (age 45); Bad Segeberg, Schleswig-Holstein, West Germany
- Education: Konservatorium Wien
- Occupation: Conductor
- Organizations: Oper Frankfurt

Karsten Januschke (born 4 March 1980) is a German conductor in opera and concert who made an international career. He worked at the Oper Frankfurt from 2008 to 2015 and then turned to freelance work. He focused on Mozart operas, but has also conducted contemporary works such as the German premiere of Olga Neuwirth's Lost Highway.

== Life and career ==
Januschke was born in Bad Segeberg on 4 March 1980. He studied in Vienna: first piano and musicology, then conducting with Georg Mark at the Konservatorium Wien, completing with distinction. During his studies he worked as répétiteur at the Vienna State Opera from 2004, where he conducted a version for children after Wagner's Der Ring des Nibelungen. He also assisted regularly at the Theater an der Wien and the Bayreuth Festival, working with Christian Thielemann and Kirill Petrenko.

He became solo répétiteur at the Oper Frankfurt in 2008, and later Kapellmeister, learning a broad repertoire. This included Pimpinone in 2010, Lior Navok's Die kleine Meerjungfrau, Mozart's Die Zauberflöte, Così fan tutte and Idomeneo, Stravinsky's Mavra, Verdi's La traviata and Don Carlos, and Die Fledermaus by Johann Strauss. He also led performances of Puccini's La bohème, Humperdinck's Hänsel und Gretel, and Aribert Reimann's Die Gespenstersonate.

From 2015, Januschka worked freelance but still based in Frankfurt. In the 2017/18 season he conducted performances of Arnulf Herrmanns Der Mieter that had its world premiere in Frankfurt; he had also prepared the Philharmonia Chor Wien, together with Walter Zeh. In the 2018/19 season, he conducted performances of Purcell's Dido and Aeneas and Bartok's Bluebeard's Castle that Barrie Kosky had staged in 2010, with Cecelia Hall as Dido, Andreas Bauer as Bluebeard and Claudia Mahnke as Judith. He also conducted Mozart's Don Giovanni at the New National Theatre Tokyo, the German premiere of Olga Neuwirth's Lost Highway and Handel's Tamerlano at the Oper Frankfurt, Beethoven's Fidelio at the Vorarlberger Landestheater, and Die Zauberflöte at the Oper im Steinbruch St. Margarethen festival.

In 2024, he conducted the first production in Frankfurt of Offenbach's Die Banditen, directed by Katharina Thoma, with a small orchestra and 22 soloists, 11 of whom were tenors. A reviewer from Die Deutsche Bühne noted:

Conductor Karsten Januschke does everything right and keeps a low profile. With the rather small orchestra in excellent form, he plays a lean, dry, delicate Offenbach, freed from false ideas of sound. Rhythm and dance take centre stage. Splashes of colour are well-dosed and discreet, while the marches and dances release great energy.

In concerts, he conducted the Deutsches Symphonie-Orchester Berlin, the Norddeutsche Philharmonie Rostock, the Münchener Kammerorchester, the MDR Leipzig Radio Symphony Orchestra, the Mecklenburgische Staatskapelle in Schwerin, the Budapest Philharmonic Orchestra and the Ensemble Modern, among others.
