= Richard Pearlman =

Richard Pearlman (1938 – 8 April 2006) was an American theatre and opera director and educator known for his encyclopedic knowledge on every aspect of opera from stage direction to makeup.

Born in Norwalk, Connecticut and raised in Tucson, Arizona, Pearlman received a degree in English from Columbia University in New York, and began his career in opera as a resident stage director at the Metropolitan Opera from 1964 to 1967 where he worked with Gian Carlo Menotti, Franco Zeffirelli, Luchino Visconti and Tyrone Guthrie. While serving as assistant director for an absent Zeffirelli, Pearlman directed his first opera, Donizetti's Lucia di Lammermoor at the Lyric Opera of Chicago in 1962.

These experiences led to his first credited direction, the first American staging of Berlioz's Béatrice et Bénédict for the Washington National Opera in the 1964-65 season. After a period as a staff director at the Metropolitan Opera, he became General Director of Washington Opera from 1967 to 1970. His work there included a version of The Medium recorded by Columbia, the operatic debut of film star Madeline Kahn, and a highly regarded film/live action production of Turn of the Screw with Benita Valente and Eleanor Steber.

In the years that followed, Pearlman made numerous directing debuts across the U.S. His association with San Francisco Opera's Spring Opera Theatre began in 1971 with Donizetti's Don Pasquale and continued with six more productions through 1976.

Pearlman staged the world premiere of George Rochberg's The Confidence Man at the Santa Fe Opera in 1982. In 1971, he directed the first professionally mounted production of The Who's rock opera Tommy starring Bette Midler, for Seattle Opera. In 1987 he staged and produced the premiere of Reaching for the Moon, a hitherto-unperformed musical by George and Ira Gershwin.

From 1976 to 1995, Pearlman served as director of the Eastman Opera Theatre at University of Rochester's Eastman School of Music where he trained many important singers including Renée Fleming. His staging of Conrad Susa's chamber opera, "Transformations," produced in Carmel Valley, California in 1977, featured Eastman School of Music students.

In 1995 Pearlman was appointed director of the Lyric Opera Center for American Artists, the Lyric Opera of Chicago's apprenticeship program where he helped launch the careers of scores of young singers, including Nicole Cabell, Erin Wall, Maria Kanyova, Dina Kuznetsova, Matthew Polenzani, David Cangelosi and Christopher Feigum.

Pearlman productions had a reputation for both faithful adherence to the intentions of the composer and bold interpretation. A production of Monteverdi’s L'incoronazione di Poppea was updated to Mussolini's Italy in the 1930s, a production of Mozart's The Magic Flute featuring a live boa constrictor, and a staging of Britten's Albert Herring was a wicked send-up of then-British Prime Minister Margaret Thatcher's Conservative utopia. "Opera is the music," he once said. "If you try to go against that, it never comes out right."

Also active as a writer and translator, his translations of La bohème, La Périchole, Faust, La finta giardiniera, and La cambiale di matrimonio (rechristened The IOU Wedding) are frequently performed.

He died from cancer at Rush University Medical Center.
