= Eliogabalo =

1667 opera by Francesco Cavalli

- Opera by Francesco Cavalli
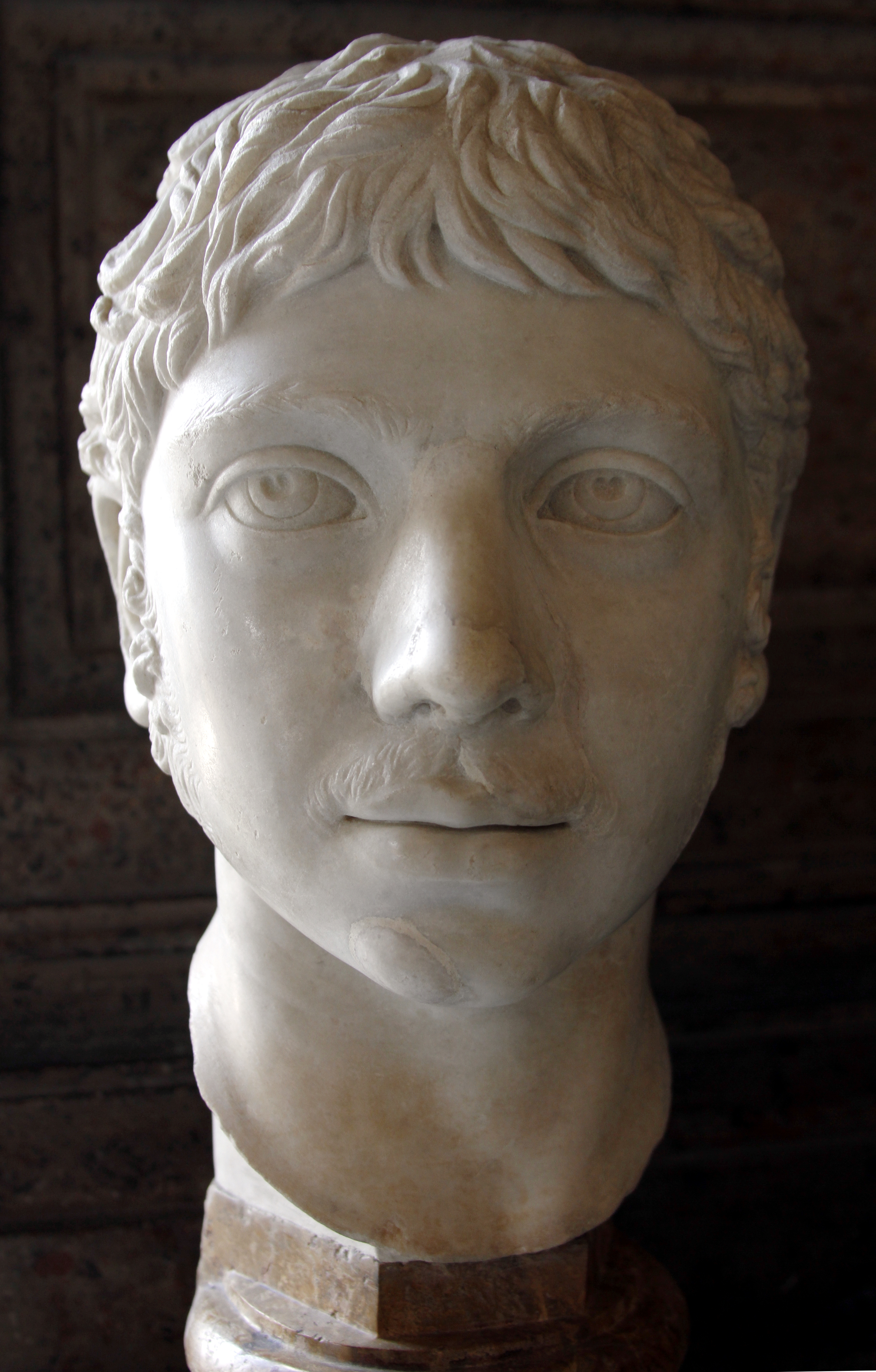
- Bust of Heliogabalus
- Librettist: Anonymous; Aurelio Aureli (revision)
- Language: Italian
- Premiere: 1668 in Venice (cancelled); 1999 in Crema, Italy

Eliogabalo (Heliogabalus) is an opera by the Italian composer Francesco Cavalli based on the reign and assassination of the debauched teenage Roman emperor Heliogabalus. The author of the original libretto remained anonymous, but it was probably reworked by Aurelio Aureli. The opera was composed in 1667 and was intended to be premiered during the Venetian Carnival season of 1668. In fact, it was not staged in Cavalli's lifetime and was replaced with a revised text by Aureli, in which Eliogabalo repents and lives, and with music by the much younger composer Giovanni Antonio Boretti, perhaps because Cavalli's style was considered too old-fashioned or because the Jesuits, who were regaining power in Venice at the time, were thought likely to oppose putting a story about a regicide on stage.

== Performance history ==
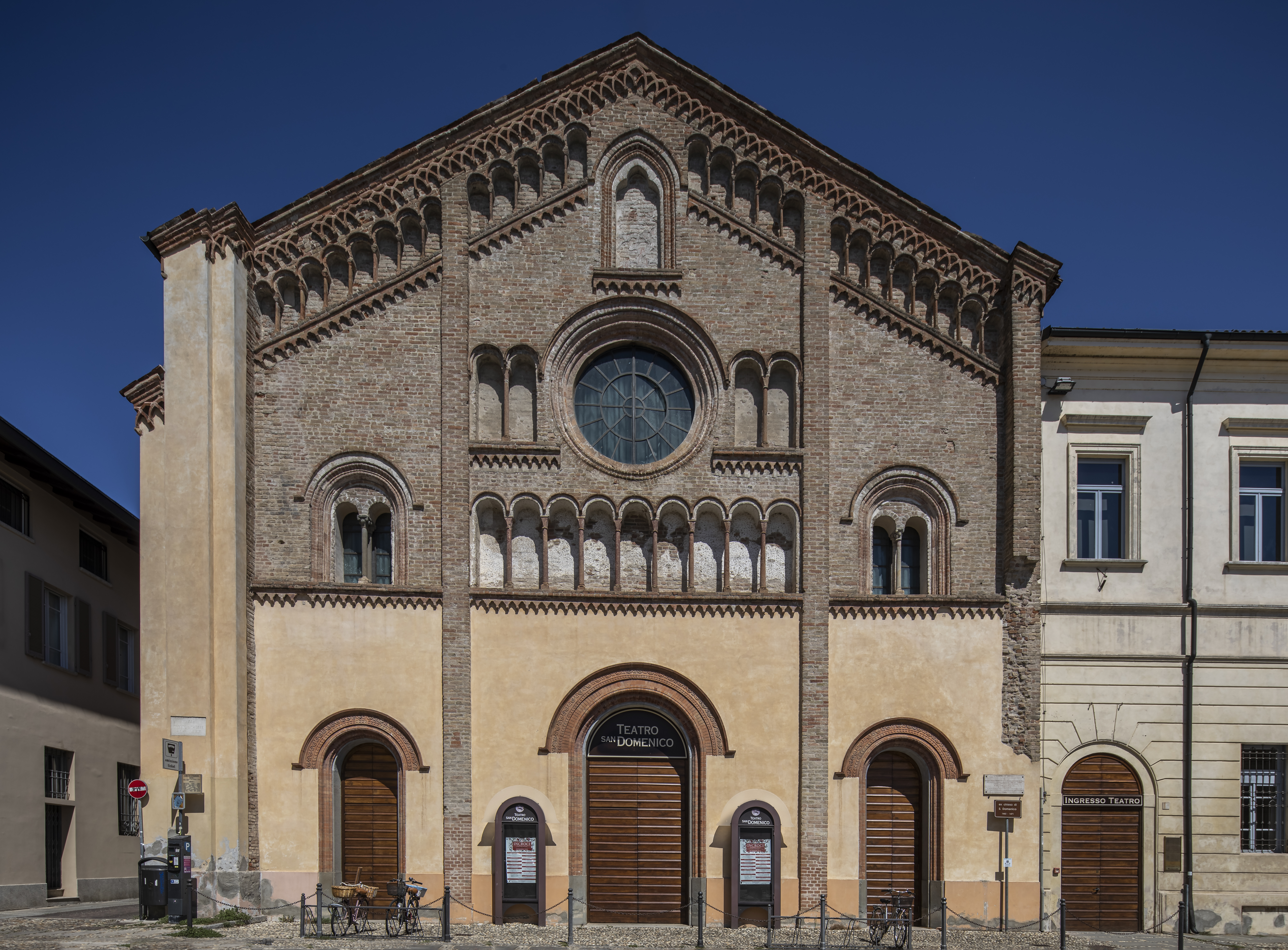
Teatro San Domenico, site of the opera's 1999 premiere

Eliogabalo received its world premiere on 27 November 1999, for the inauguration of the Teatro San Domenico in Crema, Italy, the city in which Cavalli was born. Roberto Solci conducted the instrumental ensemble I Concertanti with countertenor Antonio Giovannini as Eliogabalo and soprano Paola Cigna as Flavia Gemmira. It was the very young Giovannini's debut role.

The opera was revived at Belgium's La Monnaie in May 2004 in a production by Vincent Boussard that was conducted by René Jacobs. Jacobs used a much larger orchestra than would have been employed in a Venetian theatre in 1668. It included two flutes, three trombones, two cornets, two violins, two violas, two violas da gamba and lirone, percussion, and continuo instruments including chamber organ, three harpsichords, dulcian, theorbo, harp, guitar, cello and double bass. According to John McCann, who reviewed the performance in the British magazine Opera: "Purists might complain, but the impact was certainly striking".

Its North American premiere took place in 2007 in the Wheeler Opera House at the Aspen Music Festival in Aspen, Colorado. The nine-member period-instrument ensemble was conducted from the harpsichord by Cavalli scholar Jane Glover. The pre-professional cast included mezzo-soprano Cecelia Hall as Eliogabalo, soprano Arianna Wyatt as Flavia Gemmira, soprano Christin Wissman as Alessandro, soprano Hannah Celeste Nelson as Eritea, tenor Alex Monsoori as Lenia and baritone Ted Huffman as Tiferne.

Eliogabalo was given its UK premiere on 4 June 2009 by Grange Park Opera at The Grange. Christian Curnyn conducted players from the Early Opera Company, and mezzo-soprano Renata Pokupić sang Eliogabalo.

The Dortmund Opera performed Eliogabalo, beginning on 9 October 2011, in a production by Katharina Thoma.

Gotham Chamber Opera performed it in 2013 in a Manhattan nightclub in Chrystie Street, Richard Kimmel's The Box, directed by James Marvel.

In April 2016, the opera troupe Lyric & Co performed the work at the Grand Théâtre of Calais. The baroque ensemble Hemiolia played under the musical direction of Claire Lamquet and François Grenier. The singers were Alice Habellion (Eliogabalo), Xavier de Lignerolles (Alessandro), Nicolas Zielinski (Giuliano), Marie Cubaynes (Flavia Gemmira), Ekaterina Levental ("Une spéciale"), Stephanie Gouilly (Atilia), Yves Vandenbussche (Zotico), Christophe Crapez (Lenia) and Cyril Costanzo (Nerbulone and Tiferne).

In a co-production with the Dutch National Opera, the Paris Opera opened its 2016/17 season in the Palais Garnier with Eliogabalo under the baton of Leonardo García Alarcón and with Franco Fagioli in the title role, Paul Groves as Alessandro, Nadine Sierra as Flavia, Valer Barna-Sabadus as Giuliano, Elin Rombo as Eritrea. In 2017 the production was performed in Amsterdam, again conducted by Alarcón.

The San Francisco East Bay company West Edge Opera performed Eliogabalo in July and August 2021 in a post-COVID pandemic production at the outdoor Bruns Amphitheater in Orinda. The title role was sung by countertenor Randall Scotting; tenor Derek Chester sang Alessandro, and soprano Nikki Einfeld was Gemmira.

The Zurich Opera gave the Swiss premiere in December 2022 with 35 members of the period-instrument ensemble La Scintilla conducted by Dmitry Sinkovsky in a modern production by Calixto Bieito.

== Roles ==
Roles, voice types, premiere cast
| Role | Voice type | Premiere cast, 27 November 1999 Conductor: Roberto Solci |
|---|---|---|
| Eliogabalo, emperor of Rome | soprano | Antonio Giovannini |
| Alessandro Cesare, cousin of Eliogabalo and his designated successor, fiancé of Flavia Gemmira | soprano | Anna Simboli |
| Flavia Gemmira, Roman noble, sister of Giuliano Gordio, fiancée of Alessandro | soprano | Paola Cigna |
| Giuliano Gordio, brother of Flavia Gemmira, commander of the imperial guard | soprano | Giovanna Caravaggio |
| Anicia Eritea, Roman noble, mistress of Giuliano | soprano | Marina Morelli |
| Atilia Macrina, Roman aristocrat, in love with Alessandro | soprano | Barbara Lavarian |
| Zotico, confidant and lover of Eliogabalo | alto | Andrea Arrivabene |
| Lenia, Eliogabalo's nanny | tenor | Alessandro Carmignani |
| Nerbulone, servant of Eliogabalo | bass | Alessandro Calamai |
| Tiferne, first gladiator of the Circus Maximus, slave of Zotico | bass | Alessandro Calamai |
| First consul | alto | Lucia Cirillo |
| Second consul | soprano | Daniela Guerini Rocco |

== Synopsis ==
Place: Rome
Time: 222 AD

=== Background ===
Elagabalo considers himself a god who is above all laws. He lives exclusively for his pleasure, without caring about the feelings of his fellow human beings. His servants Zotico and Lenia help him in his misdeeds. Eliogabalo's cousin Alessandro is his designated successor as Caesar. Although he too suffers from the emperor's actions, he remains loyal. Alessandro loves Gemmira, the sister of Praetorian Prefect Giuliano, who in turn is engaged to the noble Roman woman Eritea. The emperor desires both women. He has already raped Eritea and then appeased her with a promise of marriage, which he has no intention of keeping. Further complications arise from the fact that the young Roman woman Atilia is in love with Alessandro and keeps trying to win him over. The servant Nerbulone causes several comical situations

=== Act 1 ===
A small square

Scene 1. After Alessandro has crushed a revolt by the Praetorian Guard, the soldiers and their prefect Giuliano beg the emperor for mercy. Eliogabalo is merciful. At the moment, his thoughts are only with Giuliano's fiancée Eritea, whom he tries to calm down with flattering words after the rape. Eritea reminds him of his promise, because only marriage can restore her honor. Giuliano is horrified to hear that the emperor confirms his word and then orders him to take Eritea to his chambers.

Scene 2. As soon as Eliogabalo is alone with his confidants Zotico and Lenia, he reveals that promises have no meaning for him. He orders Lenia to provide him with further pleasures and to bring him, at her own choice, either Atilia or Gemmira, whose beauty he has already heard about.

Square in Rome with a temple

Scene 3. Lenia confesses her love to Nerbulone. But since money is more important to him than anything else, she promises him great riches and gives him a valuable ring.

Scene 4. Nerbulone is triumphant. He prefers a generous old woman to a young beauty who is difficult to win over.

Scene 5. In front of the temple, Gemmira complains to the gods about her feelings of jealousy, which torment her despite her loyalty to Alessandro.

Scene 6. Alessandro, on the other hand, is overjoyed about his love for Gemmira. Gemmira does not trust Eliogabalo. She fears that he wants to get rid of Alessandro because of his popularity with the people and the Senate. Alessandro reassures her about this. After all, he has just put down the uprising. He wants to announce their wedding to the emperor today.

Scene 7. When Alessandro wants to talk to Eliogabalo about Gemmira, the emperor becomes attentive. He gets Zotico and Lenia to confirm Gemmira's beauty and then decides to win her for himself. He pretends to give his consent to her marriage to Alessandro and asks Alessandro to fetch her. When Alessandro is gone, the servants mock his gullibility.

Scene 8. Because Eliogabalo wants seduce Gemmira at any cost, he comes up with an insidious plan together with Zotico and Lenia: he conceives the idea of a senate consisting the most beautiful women, inviting Gemmira to join it, and showering her with honors. This will give him an opportunity to rape her. In order to allay any concerns her fiancé Alessandro may have, he is to bring another woman, Atilia Macrina, with him.

Scene 9. After Giuliano sees Eritea with Eliogabalo, he increasingly doubts her loyalty. Nerbulone comments on this with a remark about the unfortunate lovers.

Scene 10. Atilia swears her love to Alessandro with passionate words. He gently rejects her and reminds her of his engagement to Gemmira. They set off together for the women's senate as ordered by the emperor.

Scene 11. Gemmira sees Alessandro with Atilia and immediately becomes jealous. Lenia reinforces this by claiming that Alessandro is in love with Atilia, because men are fickle. Gemmira can console herself, however, because she is loved by the emperor and could even become empress herself. In any case, she should behave dismissively towards Alessandro.

Scene 12. When Alessandro arrives, Gemmira follows Lenia's advice and tells him about the emperor's invitation. She explains that Eliogabalo wants to see her alone and forbids Alessandro to accompany her.

Scene 13. Alessandro feels betrayed by Gemmira.

Senate Hall

Scene 14. As chairman of the women's senate, Eliogabalo is also wearing women's clothes. Zotico, Lenia and Atilia and the other ladies have already arrived.

Scene 15. As Gemmira enters, Eliogabalo sings a hymn to the beauty of women. Lenia suggests a game in which the blindfolded ladies have to guess who is hugging them. The emperor is delighted and takes the opportunity to approach Gemmira inappropriately.

Scene 16. At this moment, Eritea appears and sees the emperor in Gemmira's embrace. She is outraged - after all, he has promised to marry her. Lenia defuses the situation by persuading Eliogabalo to reaffirm his promise to make Eritea empress.

Scene 17. Nerbulone finds the women's senate outrageous, but Lenia thinks he can benefit from it.

=== Act 2 ===
Court

Scene 1. Once again, Alessandro rejects Atilia's declarations of love.

Scene 2. After this disappointment, Atilia swears revenge, but quickly changes her mind. She does not want to give up hope yet.

Scene 3. Giuliano meets Eritea, who is in tears. She tells him about her rape by the emperor and assures him that she has only ever loved him, Giuliano. They reconcile, but do not dare to embrace because they fear Eliogabalo's anger.

Scene 4. Since Eliogabalo still hasn't got his way with Gemmira, he comes up with a new plan with Zotico and Lenia: Gemmira and Alessandro are invited to a banquet at which Lenia will give Gemmira a sleeping potion containing opium. At the same time, Zotico is supposed to poison Alessandro, who has become too popular with the guards in Eliogabalo's view.

Scene 5. Gemmira wants to say goodbye to Eliogabalo and return home. However, he orders her to stay until dinner. Since Gemmira is still being reluctant, Eliogabalo swears to make her empress if she is willing to return his love. But even that does not change her mind. The only thing he has left is the sleeping pill.

Scene 6. Gemmira longs for her lover Alessandro and at the same time suffers from her jealousy.

Scene 7. Observed by the amused Nerbulone, Alessandro and Gemmira accuse each other of infidelity. Finally, they realize the truth and reconcile. They realize that they cannot trust the emperor, who has invited them both to the banquet.

Scene 8. Alessandro decides to go to the banquet disguised as a mute Ethiopian in order to be able to protect Gemmira if necessary. Nerbulone wants to smuggle him in. He is looking forward to a good meal and wine.

Scene 9. Despite all their suffering, Giuliano and Eritea assure each other of their mutual love.

Scene 10. Eliogabalo observes the couple unnoticed and decides to use their love to his advantage. At first he is outraged by Eritea's infidelity, but then he shows mercy and promises to release her if Giuliano gives him his sister Gemmira.

Scene 11. Giuliano, who would rather die than betray either his lover or his sister, declares he must choose between the plague and cholera.

Garden with tables set

Scene 12. Zotico and Lenia prepare the banquet. Zotico mocks people's love transgressions. Lenia has pangs of conscience. She has no concerns about the sleeping potion, but the murder of the imperial cousin and designated heir to the throne seems to her to be a shameful crime. Zotico calms her down by saying that the order came from the emperor and was therefore legitimate.

Scene 13. Gemmira comes to the meal as agreed and makes excuses for Alessandro's absence. Meanwhile, Nerbulone drinks the wine intended for her with the opium. Eliogabalo does not want to wait any longer and begins the meal. But then Lenia shows him Nerbulone, who has now fallen asleep. Suddenly owls appear in the garden and devour the food - a bad omen. Zotico convinces the emperor that the plan has failed in every respect. Eliogabalo wants to try again the next day.

=== Act 3 ===
Hall

Scene 1. Gemmira and Eritea have finally had enough of the emperor's misdeeds. When Lenia appears, they accuse her of complicity and chase her out.

Scene 2. The two women ask Giuliano to murder the emperor to restore their injured honor. Giuliano hesitates at first because he does not want to become a traitor. Finally, he realizes that he cannot respect the honor of the person who has tarnished the honor of his beloved. The emperor must die. He informs the two that the emperor wanted to persuade him to give him Gemmira as a playmate.

Scene 3. Alessandro blames Nerbulone for the failure of their plan. Nerbulone refers to the wine and tells Alessandro that Eliogabalo wants to repeat the banquet the following day.

Scene 4. Eliogabalo compares himself to a god whose wishes supersede all else. He hardly listens when Lenia tells him that Gemmira no longer trusts her. From outside, shouts of the Praetorians ring out, demanding the Emperor's death because they still haven't received their pay. Lenia convinces him to appease them with gold. The soldiers leave, but Eliogabalo fears further uprisings, which may be due to the soldiers' love for Alessandro. He must therefore eliminate him as quickly as possible. Zotico suggests holding a gladiator fight, to which Alessandro must appear. There will be a suitable opportunity there. Lenia says that Eliogabalo can have fun with Gemmira in his chambers in the meantime.

Scene 5. While the Emperor revels in the anticipation of the pleasures of love with Gemmira, which he will force by force if necessary, Giuliano prepares to murder him.

Scene 6. Alessandro prevents the assassination at the last second, without the Emperor noticing anything. But he immediately releases his lover's brother. He apologizes to Eliogabalo for his absence from the banquet. The emperor orders him to come to the gladiator fight at all costs and sends him away because he wants to speak to Giuliano alone. Alessandro hides to listen. Giuliano promises Eliogabalo his sister's hand - but wants to kill him first.

Scene 7. As agreed with Giuliano, Gemmira pretends to agree to the emperor's marriage wishes. He passionately declares his love for her. Gemmira is nevertheless cautious because she has noticed Alessandro hiding. The disappointed Eliogabalo leaves, swearing revenge. Giuliano fears that their plan will now fail.

Scene 8. Alessandro believes he has lost Gemmira forever.

Scene 9. For the third time, Atilia declares her love to Alessandro and he still wants to remain faithful to Gemmira. However, if he was forced to marry someone else, it would be Atilia.

Scene 10. Gemmira only hears his last words and believes he has come to an agreement with Atilia. The two blame each other again and reconcile after the necessary explanations. Giuliano arrives and informs her of his plan to kill the emperor. Alessandro wants nothing to do with it. Even when Gemmira explains to him that they can only marry if Eliogabalo falls, he remains steadfast.

Scene 11. Zotico and Lenia go over the plan for the evening again. When Lenia praises herself for her ingenuity, Zotico says that the young girls could learn from her. Lenia advises not to underestimate love.

Circus Maximus

Scene 12. The games begin without the Emperor having arrived. Alessandro fears that he might harm Gemmira. Giuliano reassures him: Gemmira is in his chambers under the protection of his soldiers. The next match in the circus is the previously undefeated gladiator Tiferne, who is to fight a wild beast. When Giuliano asks what kind of beast it is, Tiferne replies that it is the one that Eliogabalo despises the most. He draws his sword to attack Alessandro, but is immediately overpowered by the others. He then admits that he received orders from Zotico, who in turn is acting on behalf of the Emperor. This convinces those present of Eliogabalo's wickedness. Everyone demands his death.

Scene 13. Gemmira appears with her hair disheveled and reports that the Emperor entered her chambers and tried to rape her. When she called for help, the guards rushed to her aid and killed Eliogabalo. Despite the clear circumstances, Alessandro wants to punish the guards for the emperor's murder.

Scene 14. Eritea strongly disagrees with Alessandro: Eliogabalo met an end that was appropriate to his deeds. Just as his life had insulted purity, his death restored the purity of the Tiber. Gemmira and Giuliano agree with her and list Eliogabalo's misdeeds once again. Finally, Alessandro also realizes that he can do nothing against the will of heaven. It is a collective guilt, and everyone is as innocent as they are guilty.

Scene 15. Atilia reports that Zotico and Lenia were killed by the angry people. In the name of the people, two consuls crown Alessandro the new emperor. He introduces Gemmira, whom he has loved for a long time, as his wife and empress. Eritea and Giuliano can also marry. Atilia realizes that she must give up her hopes for Alessandro and look for another husband. Everyone praises the imperial couple.

== Recordings ==
- 1999 audio: Antonio Giovannini, soprano, as Eliogabalo; Paola Cigna, soprano, as Gemmira; Anna Simboli, soprano, as Alessandro; Marina Morelli, soprano, as Eritea; Giovanna Caravaggio, mezzo-soprano, as Giuliano; Barbra Lavarian, soprano, as Atilia; Andrea Arrivabene, contralto, as Zotico; Alessandro Carmignani, tenor, as Lenia; Alessandro Calamai, bass, as Nerbulone; Lucia Cirillo, mezzo-soprano, as First Consul; Daniela Guerini Rocco, soprano, as Second Consul. I Concertanti, conducted by Roberto Solci. Recorded Teatro San Domenico, Crema, November 1999.
- 2014 audio excerpts: Act 3, scene 2: "Giuliano al tuo ferro" Act 3, scene 15: "Pur ti stringo, pur t'annodo"- Cappella Mediterranea, conducted by Leonardo García Alarcón, Clematis, Thomas Dunford, Sara Van Oudenhove, Mariana Flores. Part of the album Cavalli: Heroines of the Venetian Baroque.
- 2016 video: Franco Fagioli, countertenor, as Eliogabalo; Paul Groves, tenor, as Alessandro Cesare; Nadine Sierra, soprano, as Flavia Gemmira; Valer Sabadus, countertenor, as Giuliano Gordio; Elin Rombo, soprano, as Anicia Eritea; Mariana Flores, soprano, as Atilia Marcrina; Matthew Newlin, tenor, as Zotico; Emiliano Gonzalez Toro, tenor, as Lenia; Scott Conner, bass, as Nerbulone and Tiferne. Orchestre Cappella Mediterranea and Chœur de Chambre de Namur, conducted by Leonardo García Alarcón. Co-production of the Dutch National Opera and the Paris Opera, directed by Thomas Jolly. Recorded live at the Palais Garnier. Streaming HD video: Paris Opera Play.
