= Donald Gramm =

American bass-baritone

Donald John Gramm (February 26, 1927 – June 2, 1983) was an American bass-baritone whose career was divided between opera and concert performances. His appearances were primarily limited to the United States, which at the time was unusual for an American singer. John Rockwell of The New York Times described Gramm as follows: "He had an unusually rich, noble tone, and although its volume may not have been large, it penetrated even the biggest theaters easily. Technically, he could handle bel-canto ornamentation fluently. But his real strengths lay in his aristocratic musicianship (impeccable phrasing that he polished by accompanying himself at the piano, and an easy command of five languages) and his instinctive acting." Among the most notable of his many operatic roles were the title role in Verdi's Falstaff, Leporello in Mozart's Don Giovanni, and Dr. Schön and Jack the Ripper in Berg's Lulu.

== Early life and training ==
Gramm was born Donald John Grambsch in Milwaukee, Wisconsin of German ancestry. He later changed the surname Grambsch to Gramm. He received his early musical training at the Wisconsin College Conservatory of Music (1933–1944) and sang his operatic debut at age 17 at Chicago's Eighth Street Theater as Raimondo in Donizetti's Lucia di Lammermoor. He later studied at the Chicago Musical College and with Martial Singher at the Music Academy of the West.

== Adult life ==
Donald Gramm lived for over 25 years, until his death, with his life partner Donald Dervin in New York City. They shared two connected brownstones on Park Avenue with the renowned theatrical and arts philanthropist, Robert L. B. Tobin. They also spent time at their houses in Connecticut and Santa Fe, where he performed with the Santa Fe Opera.

== Career ==
He made his New York debut in 1951 in Berlioz's L'enfance du Christ with The Little Orchestra Society. The following year he made his New York City Opera debut as Colline in Puccini's La bohème and continued to sing with that company in nearly every season for the next 30 years. His roles there included both the Count and Figaro in Mozart's The Marriage of Figaro, Orlofsky (transposed down from the original) in Johann Strauss's Die Fledermaus, Dandini in Rossini's La Cenerentola, Bartolo in Rossini's The Barber of Seville, and the title role in Verdi's Falstaff. In 1953 he created the role of The Bachelor in the world premiere of Bohuslav Martinů's The Marriage with the NBC Opera Theatre.

Gramm also performed major roles frequently with Sarah Caldwell's Opera Company of Boston and John Crosby's Santa Fe Opera. In an interview Caldwell had this to say about Gramm as a performer: "Conductors and stage directors love him. Donald's high level of musicianship and intelligence, and his beautiful voice are attributes which make him the logical choice of a conductor. His remarkable ability for physical characterization and his deep interest in its development make him the logical choice of a stage director. This fusion of musical and dramatic qualities sets him apart as one of the most extraordinary singing actors of our time."

=== Metropolitan Opera performances ===
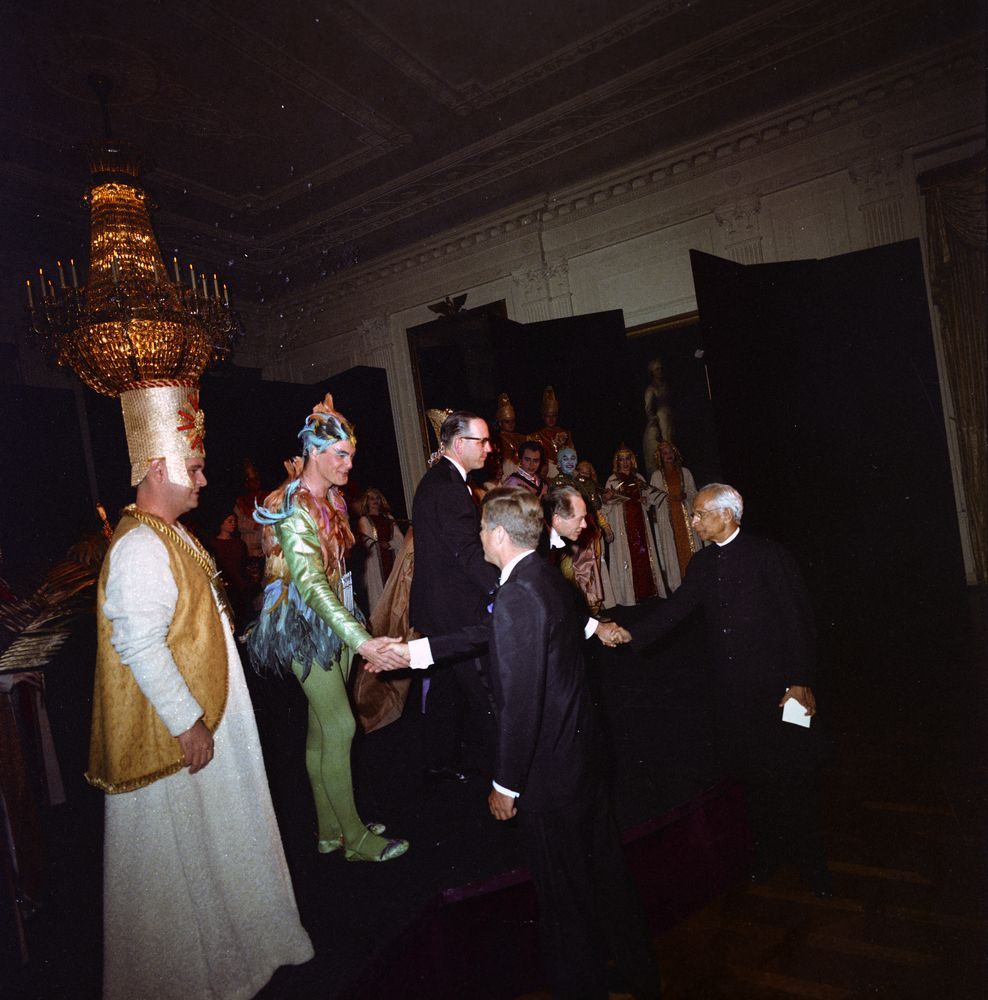
President John F. Kennedy and President Dr. Sarvepalli Radhakrishnan of India greet actors following a performance of Mozart’s “The Magic Flute” in the East Room of the White House. Donald Gramm (left) and John Reardon shaking hands with President John F. Kennedy.

Gramm's Met Opera debut was on January 10, 1964, in the minor role of Truffaldino in Richard Straus's Ariadne auf Naxos. One of the most important roles Gramm performed during his career at the Met was Leporello in Mozart's Don Giovanni. He performed the part 24 times with the company between 1966 and 1981; of these only 5 were in New York, the remainder were on tour. Roles performed in the 1964–65 season included the Maharajah in Menotti's The Last Savage (a part which rises to high F-sharp), Don Alfonso in Mozart's Così fan tutte, and the Doctor in Berg's Wozzeck; in the 1965–66 season, Count Waldner in Strauss's Arabella, Pedro in Offenbach's La Périchole, Geronte in Puccini's Manon Lescaut, and Leporello in Don Giovanni; in the 1966–67 season, Dr.Falke in Die Fledermaus; in the 1967–68 season, the Speaker in Mozart's Die Zauberflöte, Plunkett in Flotow's Martha, and again the Doctor in Wozzeck; and in the 1968–69 season, the Doctor in Wozzeck. He did not perform in the 1969–70 season.

In the 1970–71 season he appeared again as Pedro in La Périchole and Leporello in Don Giovanni but also added Don Basilio in Rossini's Il barbiere di Siviglia and the Bailiff in Massenet's Werther. In the 1971–72 season he repeated the role of Bailiff in Werther, added Kothner in Wagner's Die Meistersinger von Nürnberg, but most importantly sang Sulpice in Donizetti's La fille du régiment (with Dame Joan Sutherland as Marie and Luciano Pavarotti as Tonio). In the 1972–73 season he was cast as Zuniga in Göran Gentele's new production of Bizet's Carmen (with Marilyn Horne as Carmen and James McCracken as Don José); he repeated his roles as the Speaker, Leporello, and Sulpice, and added Captain Balstrode in Britten's Peter Grimes (with Jon Vickers in the title role). In the 1973–74 season he performed Papageno in Die Zauberflöte. In the 1974–75 season he repeated the Doctor in Wozzeck and added Varlaam in Mussorgsky's Boris Godunov. In the 1975–76 season he repeated Papageno and added the roles of Dr. Schön and Jack the Ripper in Berg's Lulu, the Met's first production of the opera, directed by John Dexter. In the 1977–78 season he repeated Captain Balstrode and Leporello. In the 1978–79 season, on the Met's Spring Tour, he added the title role in Donizetti's Don Pasquale. He never performed this part at the Metropolitan Opera House in New York.

In the 1980–81 season he again sang only on tour, repeating his portrayal of Leporello; but in the 1981–82 season he appeared as Don Alfonso in a new production of Così fan tutte; on the tour he repeated his portrayal of Papageno. In 1982–83, his final season at the Met, Gramm alternated with Paul Plishka as Varlaam and Pimen in Boris Godunov, and repeated the role of Count Waldner in a new production premiere of Arabella on 10 February 1983. Patrick J. Smith, writing in Opera, described his performance as follows: "Donald Gramm, as Waldner, underplayed the role rather than making it into a broad-accented German buffo, and brought to life the inner pride of the down-at-heel nobleman. His first-act scene with Mandryka was a highpoint of the evening (this must be one of the most closely characterized duologues in opera); the clarity of his enunciation was exemplary." Gramm repeated the role 6 more times, giving his final performance at the Met in a matinee broadcast on March 5, 1983. In total he had appeared 230 times with the company.

== Death ==
Gramm died of a heart attack in New York City on June 2, 1983. He was 56 years old. He had just finished a set of performances in Bellini's Norma with Sarah Caldwell and the Opera Company of Boston on May 29. His publicist said he had complained of chest pains the previous week, but otherwise appeared to be in good health.

== Recordings ==
=== Audio ===
Berlioz: La damnation de Faust • Boston Symphony Orchestra, Harvard Glee Club, Radcliffe Choral Society

- Recording date: 1954 (Boston Symphony Hall)
- Conductor: Charles Munch
- Principal singers: David Poleri (Faust); Martial Singher (Méphistophélès); Suzanne Danco (Margeurite); Donald Gramm (Brander)
- Label: RCA Victor (USA) LM-6114 (E4RP-8102 – E4RP-8107) (3 LPs, mono, issued [1954])
- Label: His Master's Voice (UK) ALP1225-7 (3 LPs, mono)
  - "Magnificent! ... The Brander (presumably American) does the Song of the Rat effectively...." Gramophone review December 1955, p. 178. Retrieved January 5, 2010.
- Label: RCA Victrola (UK) VIC6109/1-2 (mono) and VICS6109/1-2 (electronic stereo) (2 LPs)
  - Re: electronic stereo: "I could detect no sense of direction, nor clarification of texture...." Gramophone review March 1969, p. 1332. Retrieved January 5, 2010.
- Label: RCA Victor Gold Seal (UK) GD87940 (2 CDs, 141 minutes, ADD)
  - Also includes Debussy's La Damoiselle élue.
  - "...Sir Colin Davis's electrifying Philips performance ... is not only unsurpassed but likely to remain so.... Munch ... shows a greater grasp of Berliozian nuance than Ozawa...." Gramophone comparative review of the Ozawa and Munch recordings February 1989, p. 1320. Retrieved January 5, 2010.

Mozart: Don Giovanni • English Chamber Orchestra, Ambrosian Singers

- Recording date: 1969
- Conductor: Richard Bonynge
- Principal singers: Gabriel Bacquier (Don Giovanni); Joan Sutherland (Donna Anna); Pilar Lorengar (Donna Elvira); Marilyn Horne (Zerlina); Werner Krenn (Don Ottavio); Donald Gramm (Leporello); Leonardo Monreale (Masetto); Clifford Grant (Commendatore)
- Label: Decca (UK) SET412-5 (4 LPs, stereo)
  - "Donald Gramm's Leporello, distinctly darker-toned than [the] Giovanni, comes across well: good, unaffected singing, without exaggeration or coarseness ... [but] perhaps, not a strongly characterful reading." Gramophone review, February 1970, pp. 1312, 1319. Retrieved January 5, 2010.
- Label: Decca Grand Opera (UK) 448 973-2DMO3 (3 CDs, 184 minutes, ADD)
  - "Leporello (the excellent Donald Gramm) ... a landmark set in its way...." Gramophone review, May 1997, pp. 112–113. Retrieved January 5, 2010.

Donizetti: Don Pasquale • London Symphony Orchestra, Ambrosian Opera Chorus

- Recording date: 1978
- Conductor: Sarah Caldwell
- Principal singers: Donald Gramm (Don Pasquale); Beverly Sills (Norina); Alfredo Kraus (Ernesto); Alan Titus (Dr. Malatesta); Henry Newman (Notary)
- Label: Angel (USA) SBLX 3871 (2 LPs, issued 1978)
- Label: EMI Classics 724356603028 (2 CDs, 122 minutes, ADD)
  - "Donald Gramm is a well-mannered, vivid Pasquale...." Gramophone review, March 1997, p. 93. Retrieved January 5, 2010.

Gramm's performances as Captain Balstrode in Peter Grimes, Don Alfonso in Cosi fan Tutte and Count Waldner in Arabella are available on Metropolitan Opera on Demand.

=== Video ===
Verdi: Falstaff • London Philharmonic Orchestra, Glyndebourne Chorus

- Recording date: 1976 (live at the Opera Festival, Glyndebourne)
- Conductor: John Pritchard
- Stage Director: Jean-Pierre Ponnelle
- Principal singers: Donald Gramm (Falstaff); Benjamin Luxon (Ford); Kay Griffel (Alice Ford); Elizabeth Gale (Nannetta); Max-René Cosotti (Fenton); Nucci Condò (Mistress Quickly); Reni Penkova (Meg Page); John Fryatt (Doctor Caius); Bernard Dickerson (Bardolph); Ugo Trama (Pistol)
- Label: Arthaus Musik 101 083 (DVD, NTSC 4:3, PCM stereo, 118 min)
  - "Gramm is a true cavaliere of a Falstaff: we can tell that here is an idealist manqué with a natural dignity of manner and mien, while the American baritone's singing, while not as ideally rounded as José van Dam (Cambreling) and Ambrogio Maestri (Muti) on the rival versions..., is always well-groomed and exact." Gramophone review July 2005, pp. 107, 109. Retrieved January 5, 2010.

Gramm can also be seen and heard singing songs of Charles Ives on Episode 11 of Aaron Copland's WNET series, Music in the Twenties.
