= Marilyn Horne Song Competition =

Classical music competition

The Marilyn Horne Song Competition is an annual competition for participants of the voice and piano programs at the Music Academy of The West.

== Name ==
The Competition was launched in 1997 as the Marilyn Horne Foundation Vocal Competition and held by the Marilyn Horne Foundation. In 2010 the foundation’s programs became part of the Weill Music Institute at Carnegie Hall. The Competition is since being held by the Music Academy of the West under its current name.

== Overview ==
The competition is held in front of a jury and a public audience. Singers perform three songs, one of which has to be in English. The pianists accompany at least one of the singers. Winning singers and pianists can, but don't have to have performed together. The winners receive a monetary prize and the opportunity to perform in a prestigious venue, among other things.

The competition commemorates Gwendolyn Koldofsky, who established the first Department of Accompanying at the University of Southern California in 1947. Marilyn Horne recalls Kodofsky as “Teacher, mentor, accompanist, and my dear friend.” Together they had toured for 10 years.

== List of winners ==
Year	Singer	Voice type	Pianist	Jury members
1998	Isabel Bayrakdarian	soprano	Spencer Myer	
1999	Dina Kuznetsova	soprano		
2000	Liesel Fedkenheuer	mezzo-soprano	Spencer Myer	
2000	Nicolai Janitzky	baritone	Ji Young Lee	
2001	Ramon Diggs	tenor	Nino Sanikidze	
2002	Deborah Domanski	mezzo-soprano	Jerome Tan	Marilyn Horne, Michael Benchetrit, Fred Carama, Barbara Hocher, Gayletha Nichols
2003	Megan Latham	mezzo-soprano	Carol Wong	Marilyn Horne, Michael Benchetrit, Mary Lou Falcone, Barbara Hocher, Robert White
2004	Daniela Lehner	mezzo-soprano	Marie-Ève Scarfone	Marilyn Horne, Michael Benchetrit, Sheri Greenawald, Barbara Hocher, Bill Vendice
2005	Elaine Alvarez	soprano	Tamara Sanikidze	Marilyn Horne, Michael Benchetrit, Mary Lou Falcone, Barbara Hocher, Brian Zeger
2005	Isabel Leonard	mezzo-soprano	Tamara Sanikidze	Marilyn Horne, Michael Benchetrit, Mary Lou Falcone, Barbara Hocher, Brian Zeger
2006	Evan Hughes	bass-baritone		Marilyn Horne, Mary Lou Falcone, Barbara Hocher, Speight Jenkins, Robert White
2007	Nadine Sierra	soprano	Karen Kyung-Eun Na	Marilyn Horne, Michael Benchetrit, Thomas Hampson, Barbara Hocher, Ken Noda (absent), Gianna Rolandi
2008	Simone Osborne	soprano	In-Sun Suh	Marilyn Horne, Michael Benchetrit, Barbara Hocher, Kenneth Merrill, and Joan Morris
2008	Edward Parks	baritone	In-Sun Suh	Marilyn Horne, Michael Benchetrit, Barbara Hocher, Kenneth Merrill, and Joan Morris
2009	Jeffrey Hill	tenor	Lio Kuokman	Marilyn Horne, Mary Lou Falcone, Margo Garrett, Barbara Hocher, Peter Kazaras
2009	Ronnita Miller	mezzo-soprano	Lio Kuokman	Marilyn Horne, Mary Lou Falcone, Margo Garrett, Barbara Hocher, Peter Kazaras
2010	Megan Marie Hart (as Megan Hart)	soprano	Sun Ha “Sunny” Yoon	
2011	Karen Vuong	soprano	Saule Tlenchiyeva	
2012	Tracy Cox	soprano	Maureen Zoltek	
2013	John Brancy	baritone	Mario Antonio Marra	
2014	Michelle Bradley	soprano	Michael Gaertner	Marilyn Horne, Barbara Hocher, Jeremy Geffen, Matthew Epstein, Alexander Neef, Craig Terry
2015	Benjamin Dickerson	baritone	Alden Gatt	Marilyn Horne, Matthew Epstein, Barbara Hocher, Martin Katz, Gayletha Nichols
2016	Ben Lowe	baritone	Madeline Slettedahl	Marilyn Horne, Margo Garrett, Barbara Hocher, Nicholas Mathias, Emmanuel Villaume
2017	Hannah Rose Kidwell	soprano	Christina Giuca	Marilyn Horne, Renée Fleming, Jake Heggie
2018	Kelsey Lauritano	mezzo-soprano	Andrew Sun	Marilyn Horne, Ricky Ian Gordon, Ken Noda, Susanna Phillips
2019	Sun-Ly Pierce	mezzo-soprano	Chien-Lin Lu	Marilyn Horne, Michael Heaston, Jennifer Higdon
2021	Shawn Roth	tenor	Alexander Soloway	
2022	Joanne Evans	mezzo-soprano	Tzu-Kuang Tan	Ana María Martínez, Sasha Cooke, Martin Katz
2023	Navasard Hakobyan	baritone	Brian Cho	
2024	Mariam Mouawad	mezzo-soprano	Eric Head	Brenda Rae, Peter Kazaras, Howard Watkins
2025	Jack Burrows	baritone	Tony Stauffer	Brad Moore, Ed Parks, Kamala Sankaram
