= Cecelia Hall (mezzo-soprano) =

American mezzo-soprano

- Born: North Carolina, U.S.
- Education: DePaul University; Juilliard School; Lindemann Young Artist Development Program; Ryan Opera Center
- Occupation: Operatic mezzo-soprano
- Organizations: Oper Frankfurt
- Website: ceceliahall.com

Cecelia Hall (born c. 1985) is an American operatic mezzo-soprano. A native of North Carolina, Hall trained as a singer at DePaul University and the Juilliard School before joining the young artist programs at the Metropolitan Opera and the Lyric Opera of Chicago. She made her European debut at the Aix-en-Provence Festival in 2014 and became a resident artist at Oper Frankfurt in 2016, a position she remains in as of 2024. She continues to perform as a guest artist in operas and concerts with other organizations internationally. She has performed leading roles in the mezzo-soprano repertoire including title roles, both women such as Purcell's Dido, Rossini's La Cenerentola, and Piazzolla's María de Buenos Aires, and men including Cavalli's Eliogabalo, Handel's Ariodante, Serse and Teseo, Mozart's Ascanio in Alba and Humperdinck's Hänsel. She portrayed Bizet's Carmen in the Austin Lyric Opera in 2024.

== Early life, education, and beginning career in the United States ==
Hall was raised in rural North Carolina. She entered DePaul University's School of Music in Chicago in 2002, and made her opera debut while an undergraduate student at the Opera in the Ozarks portraying the title role in a production of Massenet's Cendrillon (English: Cinderella). After graduating from DePaul in 2006, she studied at the Aspen Music Festival and School where she portrayed the title character of a cross-dressing Greek Emperor in Francesco Cavalli's sexually charged Eliogabalo in 2007. She later returned to the Aspen Music Festival as a guest artist in 2015; portraying the title role in Piazzolla's tango opera María de Buenos Aires.

Hall next pursued graduate studies at the Juilliard School in New York City and achieved a master's degree in 2011. While a student there, she portrayed four roles with the Juilliard Opera: both Cherubino in Mozart's The Marriage of Figaro and the title role in Handel's Ariodante in 2009; Nero in the school's 2010 production of Monteverdi’s L'incoronazione di Poppea with Harry Bicket conducting; and Concepción in Ravel's L'heure espagnole in 2011.

On March 6, 2010, Hall made her debut with the New York Philharmonic at Avery Fisher Hall performing the "Habanera" from Bizet's Carmen in a Young People's Concert. Later that month, she performed Johannes Brahms's Ophelia Lieder with Ensemble ACJW at Carnegie Hall. That same year, she was chosen to appear in a recital at Lincoln Center, with baritone John Brancy. She programmed excerpts from a song cycle by Alan Smith, Vignettes: Ellis Island on texts from oral histories of immigrants in the 1900s, followed by Debussy's Chansons de Bilitis and songs from Mahler's Rückert Lieder. In the summer of 2010 she studied at the Tanglewood Music Center, and portrayed the Composer in R. Strauss's Ariadne Auf Naxos at the Tanglewood Festival with the Boston Symphony Orchestra. She later performed this role again at the Fort Worth Opera (2013) the Opera Theatre of Saint Louis (2016), and the Moscow Philharmonic (2017).

After graduating from Juilliard, Hall was awarded a Sara Tucker Study Grant in 2011 and continued to train as a member of the Lindemann Young Artist Development Program at the Metropolitan Opera (Met). She made her Met debut as the Second Priestess in Gluck's Iphigénie en Tauride with Susan Graham in the title role on February 12, 2011; a role which she recorded for Metropolitan Opera Live in HD. She continued her development as an opera singer at the Ryan Opera Center at the Lyric Opera of Chicago (LOC); joining that organization in 2011. Roles she performed with the LOC include Alisa in Donizetti's Lucia di Lammermoor (2011), the Second Lady in Mozart's The Magic Flute (2011), the Voice of the High Priestess in Aida (2012), the third maid in Elektra by Richard Strauss (2012), and Annio in Mozart's La clemenza di Tito (2014). She was awarded LOC's Brian Dickie Outstanding Young Singer Award in 2012.

In 2012, Hall portrayed the title role in Handel's Teseo at the Chicago Opera Theater. She appeared as the Rhinemaiden Wellgunde in Wagner's Ring cycle at the Seattle Opera in 2013 under conductor Asher Fisch. A reviewer of this production wrote that all three Rhinemaidens "offered both welcome comic relief and gorgeous singing". She returned the following year for Zerlina in Mozart's Don Giovanni, alongside Nicolas Cavallier in the title role. She later performed the role of Zerlina at Opera Philadelphia in 2014.

== International career: 2014-present ==
In 2014, Hall made her European debut at the Aix-en-Provence Festival as Zaida in Rossini's Il turco in Italia. Later that year, she made an unplanned appearance at the Bavarian State Opera as Cherubino in Mozart's Le nozze di Figaro; filling in at the last minute for another performer. The same year, she portrayed Rosina in Rossini's The Barber of Seville in Toronto with the Canadian Opera Company. In 2015, she performed at the Santa Fe Opera as Ramiro in Mozart's La finta giardiniera; and returned to the Met as Javotte in Manon. She also performed the role of Dorabella that year in a semi-staged performance of Mozart's Così fan tutte with the Milwaukee Symphony Orchestra.

In 2016, Hall used her North Carolina accent to great effect as Ruby in Opera Philadelphia's production of Jennifer Higdon's Cold Mountain, and returned to Lincoln Center for performances as the alto soloist in Mozart's Great Mass in C minor at the Mostly Mozart Festival. In the summer of 2016, she appeared as the Geisha in Pietro Mascagni's rarely performed Iris at the Bard Music Festival. She also returned to her home state in 2016 to portray Rosina with the North Carolina Opera; a role she repeated in North Carolina with the Greensboro Opera in 2018.

Hall joined the roster of resident artists at Oper Frankfurt in the autumn of 2016; making her debut with the company as the cat Poppet in Britten's Paul Bunyan in October of that year. Other roles she has sung with the company include Fulvia in Gluck's Ezio (2016), the Second Lady in Die Zauberflöte (2016, 2023, & 2024) Zerlina (2017), Dorabella (2017 & 2022), Egla in Zelenka's Il Serpente di Bronzo (2018), Vlasta in Weinberg's The Passenger (2018), Hänsel in Humperdinck's Hänsel und Gretel (2018-2019), Cherubino (2019, 2021), Marguerite in La Damnation de Faust (2019), Idamante in Idomeneo (2019), Irene in Tamerlano (2019 & 2022), Mercédès in Carmen (2021), and Charlotte in Massenet's Werther (2022-2023). She appeared as Dido in Purcell's Dido and Aeneas in 2017, in a production that Barrie Kosky had created in 2010. She later reprised the role of Dido in Frankurt in 2022.

In 2020, during the COVID-19 pandemic, Oper Frankfurt staged Mozart's Figaro in a version adhering to social distancing in which Hall appeared as Marcellina alongside Liviu Holender and Adriana González as Count and Countess. A reviewer of this production described the complete ensemble as young, agile, and with flexible voices. Still with social distancing, a new 2023 production of Martin's Le vin herbé had Hall in the role of Iseut's mother; directed by Tilmann Köhler. When Mozart's Figaro was given a new production by Oper Frankfurt in 2023, the first with the new GMD Thomas Guggeis, she portrayed Marcellina in the premiere, alternating with Cherubino, A reviewer from the FAZ noted that she portrayed Figaro's mother with luminous tone as a potentially dangerous rival of Susanna. She performed the title role of Mozart's Ascanio in Alba at the Bockenheimer Depot venue, portraying the young man that Mozart conceived at age 15, with a development from "initially somewhat pallid" to the expression of anguish and joy in an "exhilarating" duet.

Since joining Oper Frankfurt, Hall has continued to perform as a guest artist with other performing arts organizations. In 2017, she portrayed Sesto in Mozart's La clemenza di Tito at the Opera Theatre of Saint Louis. That same year, she created the role of Sorrel in the world premiere of Lembit Beecher and Hannah Moscovitch’s war drama I Have No Stories to Tell You with Opera Philadelphia at the Philadelphia Museum of Art. That work was presented in a double bill with another opera about war, Claudio Monteverdi's Il combattimento di Tancredi e Clorinda, in which Hall portrayed Clorinda. In 2018, she performed the role of Dinah in Bernstein's Trouble in Tahiti with the Lexington Philharmonic Orchestra; a performance which was recorded and later broadcast on NPR station WEKU during the Covid-19 pandemic in 2020.

In 2021, Hall portrayed Romeo in Opera Omaha's production of Bellini's I Capuleti e i Montecchi, and returned to Moscow for further performances with the Moscow Philharmonic; this time as Mozart's Second Lady. In 2022, she returned to Carnegie Hall as the mezzo soloist in Mendelssohn's A Midsummer Night's Dream with the Orchestra of St. Luke’s, and portrayed the title role in Handel's Serse at London's Opera Holland Park. She repeated that role in 2023 in a production conducted by Konrad Junghänel at the Komische Oper Berlin, with the arias given in Italian, but the recitatives in German. That same year she performed the title characters Ariodante at the Israeli Opera and Rossini's La Cenerentola at the Boston Lyric Opera. In 2024, she portrayed Bizet's Carmen with the Austin Lyric Opera. A reviewer from the Austin Chronicle, who noted that the complete cast managed "to act to the rafters and still offer nuance", wrote that she "conveyed strength with a current of madness in each fluidly sensual move".

In concert, Hall performed the alto solo in Mozart's Requiem with the New York Philharmonic conducted by Jaap van Zweden in 2024, with Musica Sacra prepared by Kent Tritle.
