= Robert W. Jensen (artist) =

American artist and entertainer (1929–2018)

Robert W Jensen
- Born: 1929; Fresno, California
- Died: September 21, 2018 (aged 88–89); West Hollywood, California
- Other name: Jerry Madison
- Education: University of California, Santa Barbara
- Occupation: Artist · Singer · Dancer
- Style: Impressionist
- Website: robertwjensen.com

Robert W. Jensen was a painter, singer and dancer known for his career as an entertainer, recording work as Jerry Madison and later success as an impressionist artist.

== Early life ==
Born on a ranch in Fresno, Jensen grew up in Carmel. He was a direct descendant of Daniel Boone on his mother's side and his paternal grandparents emigrated from Denmark. Blessed with a beautiful singing voice, as a youth, Jensen was chosen to sing in church and at the Carmel Mission, as well as appearing as a boy soprano and tenor in the Carmel Bach Festival. His early success led to further study with Lotte Lehmann at the Music Academy of the West and the University of California at Santa Barbara from which he graduated with a music degree. Further study at Los Angeles City College led to roles in many local productions.

== Broadway ==
Jensen moved to New York City soon after college where he appeared in numerous musicals culminating in being cast as the young lead, Lun Tha, by Rodgers and Hammerstein in a touring production of The King & I. He then toured the country with Harry Belafonte, Raymond Massey, Tyrone Power and Judith Anderson in the 1954 road company production of John Brown’s Body. He joined Eleanor Powell's act that played many of the top nightclubs in the US as well as an appearance of the Ed Sullivan Show. That success led to a similar tour with Janis Paige. He went on to be a regular on The Ford Show and the Dinah Shore Chevy Show.

Madison Album Released in 1958

== Jerry Madison ==
Taking the stage name of Jerry Madison, Jensen became a pop recording star on Tops Records with "Merry, Mary" becoming a minor hit, putting him on the cover of Deejay magazine in April 1958. Another hit was "Von Hutch, the Mad Russian Pinstriper." He recorded a song "Girls, Glamorous Girls" for the Sherman Brothers' Buena Vista Records compilation Tinpanorama. Tops commissioned famed photographer John Engstead to photograph Jensen. As Madison, Jensen appeared on Coronado 9 and in Where the Boys Are.

== Artistic endeavors ==
From when he was young and throughout his show business career, Jensen spent his spare time painting, and it eventually became his primary love. The first Los Angeles exhibition of his impressionist works was at Galerie Marumo in 1985 entitled "California Summer." Jensen was the first American painter to have a solo show at Galerie Marumo's sister gallery in Paris with his exhibition of 24 Southern California scenes entitled "Fleurs de Liberte" coinciding with the 100th anniversary of the Statue of Liberty's presentation to the United States by France. Jensen was the only American artist represented by the gallery.

In 1988 Jensen traveled to China with journalist Bonnie Churchill. The paintings that resulted from his visit were collected into an exhibition entitled "The Waking Dragon Beckons" which were displayed at the Walter Library at Alliant International University in San Diego, the University of Redlands Armacost Library, and the USC Pacific Asia Museum. Jensen was an early adopter of digital technology with his painting Man in Yellow Straw Hat, scanning a sketch into his computer then laser printing it with a device that converted black laser output to colors.

In 1994 Jensen and Churchill produced a book entitled The Young Athlete that feature Jensen's illustrations of life lessons that celebrities such as Clint Eastwood, Elizabeth Taylor, and Bob Hope learned from playing sports as children. Jensen also illustrated Churchill's 1992 book, What Color is the Wind?. His sketches and paintings were featured in the book Sport as Symbol by Mari Womack.

Jensen painted portraits of Marguerite Piazza, Vincent Price, Boris Yeltsin and Roy Disney. He used his art to support charitable causes including the LA Philanthropic Foundation, Greater Los Angeles Zoo Association, the Los Angeles Chamber Orchestra and the Stephen S. Wise Temple.

Before he was a painter, Jensen also made a name in Los Angeles as a textile designer, designing wall coverings for John Williams' Los Angeles home. His fabric designs were displayed at the Bowers Museum in 1981 at an exhibition entitled "Inspiration to Realization."

== Official Artist of USC Band ==
Jensen was the "Official Artist of The Spirit of Troy," producing numerous paintings and two books about the band along with his partner Keith Walker. His affiliation with USC began with a painting of the band's director, Arthur C. Bartner, at the Rose Bowl Game in 1990 and he went on to produce numerous art works for the program. Jensen's paintings were projected on screen to illustrate USC Concert Band concerts. The two books Jensen and Walker produced for the organization celebrated director Bartner's 25th and 40th anniversary at the helm of the organization: Silver Celebration and The Man on the Ladder.
