= Martial Singher =

French opera singer

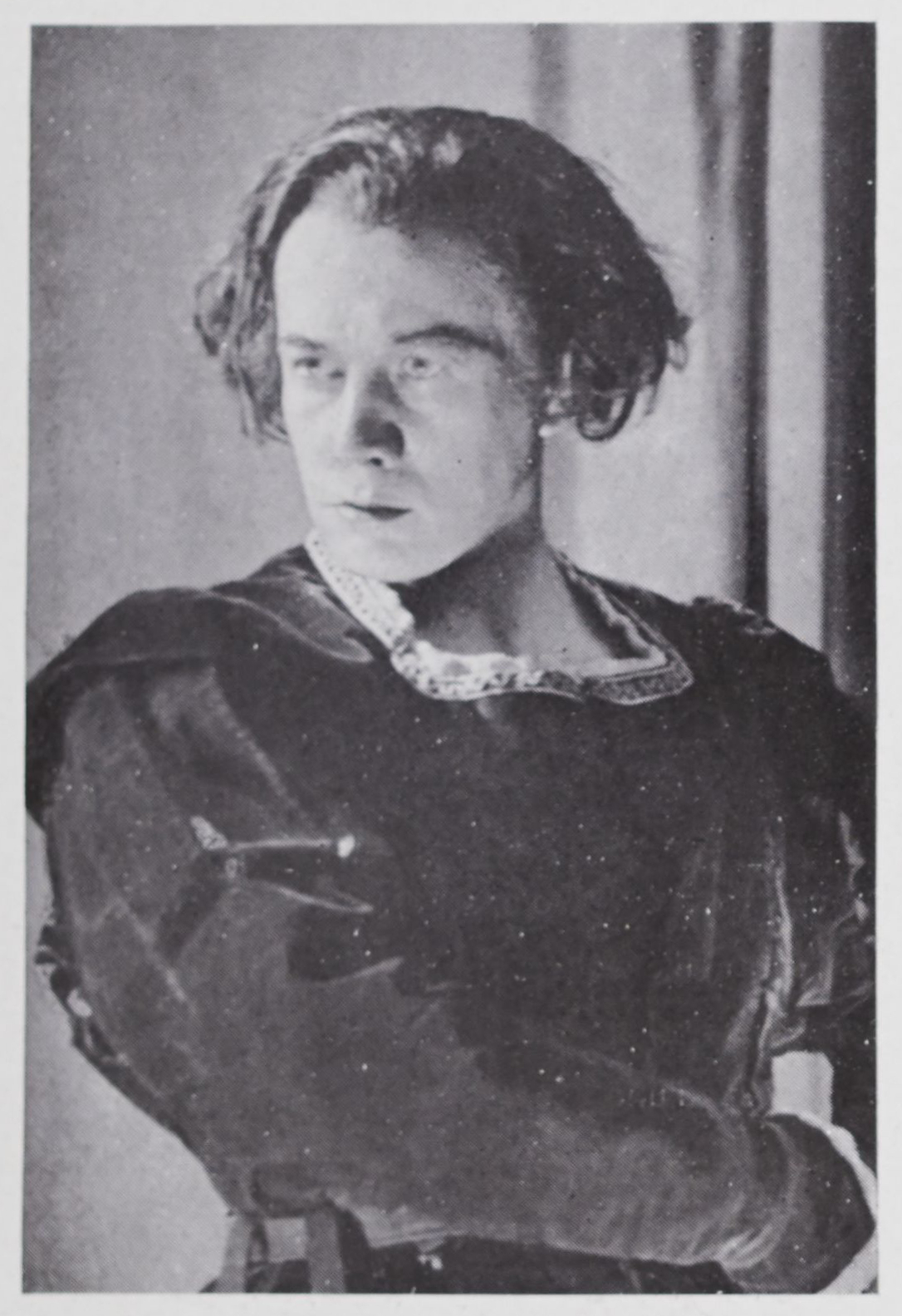
Martial Singher

Martial Singher (August 14, 1904 – March 9, 1990) was a French baritone opera singer born in Oloron-Sainte-Marie, Pyrénées-Atlantiques.

Initially singing only as a hobby, he was encouraged by then French education minister Édouard Herriot to pursue singing professionally. He would go on to perform at the Opéra National de Paris, the Royal Opera House, New York City Opera, San Francisco Opera, Chicago Opera and the Metropolitan Opera.

He recorded an acclaimed Méphistophelès under Charles Munch in the RCA recording of Berlioz's La damnation de Faust (February 1954) with the Boston Symphony Orchestra, David Poleri as Faust and Suzanne Danco as Marguerite. In 1959 he is Chorèbe in Les Troyens, conducted by Robert Lawrence in Carnegie Hall.

Later in his life he became an accomplished music teacher at the Curtis Institute of Music in Philadelphia and at the Conservatoire de musique du Québec à Montréal before moving to Santa Barbara and taking over the Music Academy of the West. He is known for influencing the careers of such artists as Sondra Radvanovsky, James King, Donald Gramm, Jeannine Altmeyer, Benita Valente, John Reardon, Louis Quilico, Jean-François Lapointe, Judith Blegen, Cynthia Hoffmann, Thomas Moser, and William Workman. Singher has also been the teacher of world-famous baritones such as Thomas Hampson and Rodney Gilfry.

He wrote a book useful to vocalists aspiring to an operatic career, An Interpretive Guide to Operatic Arias: A Handbook for Singers, Coaches, Teachers, and Students (1983).

Singher died in Santa Barbara. He had married Margareta Busch, daughter of the conductor Fritz Busch, in 1940. They had three sons. Michel Singher, is an accomplished international conductor.
