= Simone Osborne =

Canadian lyric and operatic soprano (born 2014)

Simone Osborne (born 1987) is a Canadian lyric and operatic soprano. She was one of the youngest-ever winners of the Metropolitan Opera National Council Auditions in 2008 at age 21.

== Life and career ==
Osborne was born in 1987 in British Columbia. She studied opera performance at the University of British Columbia and later joined the Canadian Opera Company's Studio Ensemble program. Prior to joining the COC, she busked on the streets of Toronto in order to be able to afford singing lessons.

In the 2010s, she was "considered one of Canada's most sought-after sopranos". She sings with the Canadian Opera Company and has also appeared with ensembles from around the world, including the New York City Opera, the Vancouver Symphony, and the Los Angeles Philharmonic. Her operatic roles have included Susanna in Le nozze di Figaro, Gilda in Rigoletto, and Pamina in Die Zauberflöte. One of her performances of Pamina, with the Vancouver Opera, required her to learn an English and Musqueam adaptation. She also participated in the Viva Verdi! gala in Zurich in celebration of Giuseppe Verdi's bicentennial.

Osborne has received significant critical recognition. F. Paul Driscol of Opera News called her a "lyric soprano with outstanding ability and impressive charm". Marilyn Horne, who Osborne cites as a mentor, said Osborne is "half athlete and half artist...She understands that voices need to be brilliant, dark and bright, all at once". Osborne was the first winner of the Jeunesses Musicales Canada's Maureen Forrester Award Tour, which comprises two seasons of recitals across Canada and a commission from the Canadian Art Song Project. Osborne has also won the Marilyn Horne Foundation Vocal Competition at the Music Academy of the West in 2009, and the International Czech and Slovak Opera Competition.
