= Michel Singher =

French-born conductor

Michel Singher is a French-born conductor who is currently Artistic Director and conductor of Espressivo—a small, intense orchestra—in Santa Cruz, California. He is also a frequent conductor at West Bay Opera.

He is an honors graduate of Harvard College in history and literature, and of the Indiana University School of Music. He began his career as an accompanist to his father, the French baritone Martial Singher. In the footsteps of his grandfather, German conductor Fritz Busch, he spent a decade conducting in German opera houses, including the Hamburgische Staatsoper. He has since conducted some 70 operas in many hundreds of performances throughout the United States. He has taught at the Freiburg Hochschule für Musik; the University of Washington; the Oberlin Conservatory of Music, where he was co-organizer of a comprehensive Alban Berg Festival in 1985; at New York University; and at San Jose State University.
