= Francesca da Rimini (Mercadante) =

Opera by Saverio Mercadante

- Opera by Saverio Mercadante
- The composer, by Cefaly
- Librettist: Felice Romani
- Language: Italian
- Based on: Silvio Pellico's play
- Premiere: 2016; Palazzo Ducale in Martina Franca

Francesca da Rimini is an 1831 opera by Saverio Mercadante to a libretto by Felice Romani based on Silvio Pellico's play which had already been set twice and ultimately was set by fifteen composers. It was to be premiered in Madrid in 1831, but the premiere was cancelled and the opera lost.

It was rediscovered and performed in July 2016 at the Palazzo Ducale in Martina Franca for the Festival della Valle d'Itria. The Austrian premiere was played on 28 December 2022 at the Tiroler Festspiele Erl, conducted by Giuliano Carella. In cooperation, and with the same scenic design, the German premiere was held on 26 February 2023 at the Oper Frankfurt. The opera was directed by Hans Walter Richter and conducted by Ramón Tebar, with Jessica Pratt in the title role, Kelsey Lauritano as Paolo and Theo Lebow as Lanclotto.

== Roles ==
Roles, voice types
Role	Voice type
Francesca	soprano
Paolo, her brother-in-law and lover	contralto
Lanciotto, her husband	tenor
Guido, her father	bass
Isaura, her confidant	soprano
Guelfo, Paolo's confidant	tenor

== Recording ==
The 2016 world premiere was recorded as DVD, with Leonor Bonilla, Aya Wakizono, Merto Süngü, Antonio Di Matteo, Larisa Martinez and Iván Ayón-Rivas, the Coro della Filarmonica di Stato "Transilvania" di Cluj-Napocathe and the Orchestra Internazionale d'Italia, conducted by Fabio Luisi, released by Dynamic in 2017.
