= Kay Griffel =

Operatic spinto soprano

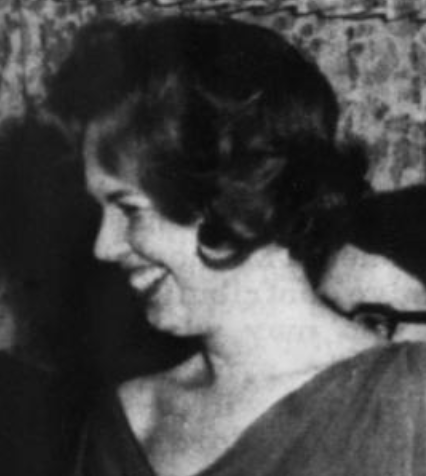
- Kay Griffel, from a 1965 publication of the US Department of State
- Born: December 26, 1940 (age 85); Eldora, Iowa
- Occupation: Opera singer

Kay Griffel (born December 26, 1940) is an American operatic spinto soprano.

== Early life and education ==
After earning a Bachelor of Music from Northwestern University, she pursued further studies with Lotte Lehmann at the Music Academy of the West in Montecito, Nadia Boulanger at the Fontainebleau School, and Pierre Bernac in Paris. She received a Fulbright Scholarship and a Rockefeller Foundation Grant, and would go on to win the 1960 NATS Artist Award and the 1962 Metropolitan Opera National Council Auditions.

== Career ==
On November 4, 1960, Griffel made her stage debut at the Lyric Opera of Chicago (LOC) as Mercedes in Georges Bizet's Carmen with Jean Madeira in the title role, Renata Scotto as Micaela, Giuseppe di Stefano as Don Jose, Robert Merrill as Escamillo, and Lovro von Matacic conducting. She also appeared at the LOC that season as the Shepherd Boy in Giacomo Puccini's Tosca, Siegrune in Richard Wagner's Die Walküre, the Little Savoyard in Umberto Giordano's Fedora, and Kate Pinkerton in Puccini's Madama Butterfly.

In 1963 Griffel then moved to Berlin and was soon given several assignments in the mezzo-soprano repertoire at the Deutsche Oper Berlin. She then became a member of the Bremen Opera and the Mainz Opera. At the later opera house she began to branch out into leading soprano roles. She continued to perform on a regular basis at the opera houses in both Karlsruhe and Bremen until 1973 when she became a resident member of the Staedtische Buehnen in Cologne.

On August 20, 1973, Griffel made her debut at the Salzburg Festival as Sybille in the world premiere performance of Orff's De temporum fine comedia. She was soon after engaged in leading roles at the Bavarian State Opera, The Deutsche Oper am Rhein, The Hamburg State Opera, The Liceu, and The Staatsoper Stuttgart. In 1976 she made her debut at the Glyndebourne Festival as Alice Ford in Giuseppe Verdi's Falstaff. In 1977 she toured with the Berlin State Opera to Japan, performing the roles of the Marschallin in Richard Strauss' Der Rosenkavalier, Donna Elvira in Wolfgang Amadeus Mozart's Don Giovanni, and the Countess Almaviva in Mozart's The Marriage of Figaro. In 1978 she portrayed Eva in Wagner's Die Meistersinger von Nürnberg at the Teatro Nacional de São Carlos.

On November 16, 1982, Griffel made her debut at the Metropolitan Opera as Elettra in Mozart's Idomeneo with Herman Malamood in the title role, Claudia Catania as Idamante, Ileana Cotrubas as Ilia, John Alexander as Arbace, and Jeffrey Tate conducting. She returned to the Met regularly over the next 7 years portraying Countess Almaviva, Rosalinde in Die Fledermaus, Tatiana in Eugene Onegin, and the title role in Strauss' Arabella. Her final performance with the company was as Mozart's Elettra on March 3, 1989.

During her career, Griffel also sang leading roles with the Frankfurt Opera, the Grand Théâtre de Bordeaux, the Houston Grand Opera, the Los Angeles Opera, La Monnaie, Maggio Musicale Fiorentino, the Opera Company of Boston, Opera Ireland, the Royal Opera, London, the Staatsoper Hannover, the Teatro Comunale di Bologna, the Teatro dell'Opera di Roma, Theater Bonn, the Théâtre du Capitole, and the Welsh National Opera among others. Some of the other roles she performed on stage were Chrysothemis in Strauss' Elektra, Cleopatra in Handel's Giulio Cesare, Desdemona in Verdi's Otello, Elisabetta in Verdi's Don Carlos, Euridice in Gluck's Orfeo ed Euridice, Fiordiligi in Mozart's Così fan tutte, Marguerite in Charles Gounod's Faust, Micaela in Bizet's Carmen, Mimi in Puccini's La bohème, Romilda in Handel's Serse, and the title roles in Strauss' Ariadne auf Naxos and Puccini's Manon Lescaut.

Griffel is a former professor of voice at the University of Michigan and has taught masterclasses at several universities and conservatories in the United States.
