= Music Academy of the West =

Location
- 1070 Fairway Road; Montecito, California 93108; United States; 34°25′09″N 119°38′56″W

Information
- Funding type: Nonprofit
- Established: 1947; 79 years ago
- President: Shauna Quill
- Chairperson: Danner Schefler
- Dean: Tiffany DeVries
- Campus size: 10 acres (4.0 ha)
- Website: www.musicacademy.org

The Music Academy of the West is a summer classical music training program in Montecito, California, and festival with performances in the County of Santa Barbara.

In addition to the Academy's flagship Montecito campus, as of 2026 it had received approval to develop a satellite music-education and performance center on State Street in downtown Santa Barbara.

== Overview ==
The academy annually enrolls 136 pre-professional musicians in their late teens and early 20s, who receive merit-based full scholarships to workshops led by famous composers, conductors, and artists. Programs of study are vocal piano, voice, collaborative piano, solo piano, and instrumental. The eight-week summer music festival consists of concerts and operas, as well as public master classes with famous musicians.

== History ==
The first impulse to establish a summer music festival in Santa Barbara County came from soprano Lotte Lehmann in 1940. In 1947 the Music Academy of the West was founded by Southern California arts patrons, musicians, conductors and composers. In addition to Lotte Lehmann, founders of the academy were voice teacher and tenor Allan Rogers Lindquest, conductor Otto Klemperer, violinist Roman Totenberg, harpsichordist Rosalyn Tureck, baritone John Charles Thomas and composers Ernest Bloch, Darius Milhaud, Roy Harris and Arnold Schoenberg, who served as the academy's first composer in residence. Among the first scholarship funders were singer-actors Jeanette MacDonald and Nelson Eddy, violinist Jascha Heifetz and movie producer Darryl F. Zanuck.

The academy first hosted its summer sessions at Cate School in Carpinteria, before starting to relocate to a 10 acre (c. 4 hectare) property in Montecito in 1951. The former Montecito Country Club, regarded as a showcase garden of Montecito and named Miraflores ("see flowers" in Spanish,) has been the academy's campus since the summer of 1952, though students had to be housed in dorms and at sorority and fraternity houses at the University of California, Santa Barbara for several years. Since 2016 accommodations are at Westmont College.

In 1954 the staff included, besides Lehmann, internationally known musicians such as pianists György Sándor and Emanuel Bay, soprano Eleanor Steber, violinist Sascha Jacobsen, and the cellist Gábor Rejtő. The student body numbered 120.

From 1954 to 1980 the academy's music director was Maurice Abravanel. Martial Singher was head of the Voice Department from 1962 till 1981. The academy was initially administered by its board of directors, before the arts administrator, musicologist and writer Robert William Holmes became its first president from 1988 to 1993. He was followed in this position by tubist David L. Kuehn in 1993. Marilyn Horne, who had attended the academy in 1953, joined the faculty in 1995 and was named director of the voice program in 1997. Violinist NancyBell Coe was appointed as the academy's president in 2004.

To preserve historic audio and video recordings of concerts, masterclasses and recitals held at the academy, recordings from 1961 till 2001 where housed at the UC Santa Barbara Library's Department of Special Research Collections in 2007.

Since 2010, the academy has held the annual Marilyn Horne Song Competition, formerly known as the Marilyn Horne Foundation Vocal Competition. In the same year trained singer Scott Reed was appointed president of the academy.

In 2014, the Music Academy of the West began an educational partnership with the New York Philharmonic. Under the collaboration, music director Alan Gilbert and orchestra members maintained residencies in Santa Barbara during parts of the festival, and selected Music Academy fellows trained with orchestra members in Santa Barbara and New York City.

The academy's partnership with the UC Santa Barbara was renewed in 2017 and 400 early recordings were digitized, among them recordings of Lotte Lehmann, Marilyn Horne, and Jerome Lowenthal.

In 2018, the academy launched a four-year partnership with the London Symphony Orchestra with music director Simon Rattle, and a free after school choral program called Sing! for children ages 7–11 taking place in elementary schools in Santa Barbara County. Participants performed at the Music Academy of the West and collaborated with the London Symphony Orchestra. In the same year, Marilyn Horne transitioned from active voice program director to honorary voice program director, a position she held till 2021 when she was named Faculty Emeritus.

In 2022 the academy celebrated its 75th anniversary and adopted a new logo with simplified title Music Academy, though its legal name remained Music Academy of the West, and the full phrase was later reintroduced to the logo. Singer Sasha Cooke and pianist John Churchwell took over as co-directors of the voice program in the same year. In 2023 trained flutist Shauna Quill was appointed president of the academy.

== Alumni ==
Alumni of the Music Academy of the West, called fellows, are former attendants of the conservatory programs. Many of them fill important professional music positions around the world, performing in top-tier orchestras, opera houses, and teaching on music school faculties. Others have gone on to leadership roles in other institutions. Notable alumni include:

=== Voice ===
- Lucine Amara (1947)
- John Brancy (2013)
- Grace Bumbry (1956, 1957, 1958)
- Sasha Cooke (2002)
- Benita Valente (1953, 1955, 1956, 1957)
- Juan Diego Flórez (as Juan Florez, 1995)
- Rodney Gilfry (1981)
- Donald Gramm
- Kay Griffel (1958)
- Thomas Hampson (1978, 1979)
- Megan Marie Hart (as Megan Hart, 2010)
- Marilyn Horne (1953)
- Robert W. Jensen (as Robert Jensen, 1949)
- Gary Lakes (1977)
- Isabel Leonard (2005)
- Kathryn Lewek (2009)
- Lotfi Mansouri (1957)
- Simone Osborne (2008, 2009, 2011)
- Susanna Phillips (2002, 2003)
- Rinat Shaham (1995, 1996, 1997)
- Nadine Sierra (2007)
- Riki Turofsky (1970)
- Erin Wall (2000)
- William Workman (1965)

=== String instruments ===
==== Violin ====
- Pamela Frank (1983, 1984)

==== Viola ====
- Donald Weilerstein (1955)
- Jan Karlin (1975, 1976)
- Cynthia Phelps (1979, 1983)

==== Cello ====
- Catherine Hewgill (1981)
- Jeffrey Solow (1964, 1965, 1966)

==== Double Bass ====
- Orin O'Brien (1952, 1953, 1955)

=== Wind instruments ===
==== Horn ====
- Barry Carl (1966, 1967, 1971)

==== Trumpet ====
- Anthony Plog (1968)

==== Tuba ====
- Jeffrey Anderson (1982)

==== Clarinet ====
- David Shifrin (1968)

==== Bassoon ====
- Benjamin Kamins (1968, 1969)

=== Piano ===
- Burt Bacharach (1950)
- James Newton Howard (1967, 1969)
- Martin Katz (1964)
- Paul Schenly (1964, 1965, 1969)

=== Conducting ===
- Jung-Ho Pak (1989)
- David Wiley (1990)

== Other students ==
Music students using the facilities for music training or performing with visiting orchestras without being enrolled are not considered alumni. Among those students are:

- Susan Allen (with the Santa Barbara Youth Theatre, 1963)
- Judith Beckmann (singing lessons with Harold Reed and Lotte Lehmann)
- Katy Perry (singing lessons at facilities)

== Sources ==
- Randel, Don Michael (1996). Randel, Don Michael (ed.). The Harvard biographical dictionary of music. Cambridge, Massachusetts, and London, England: The Belknap Press of Harvard University Press. ISBN 0674372999.
