= Paul Schenly =

American classical pianist (born 1948)

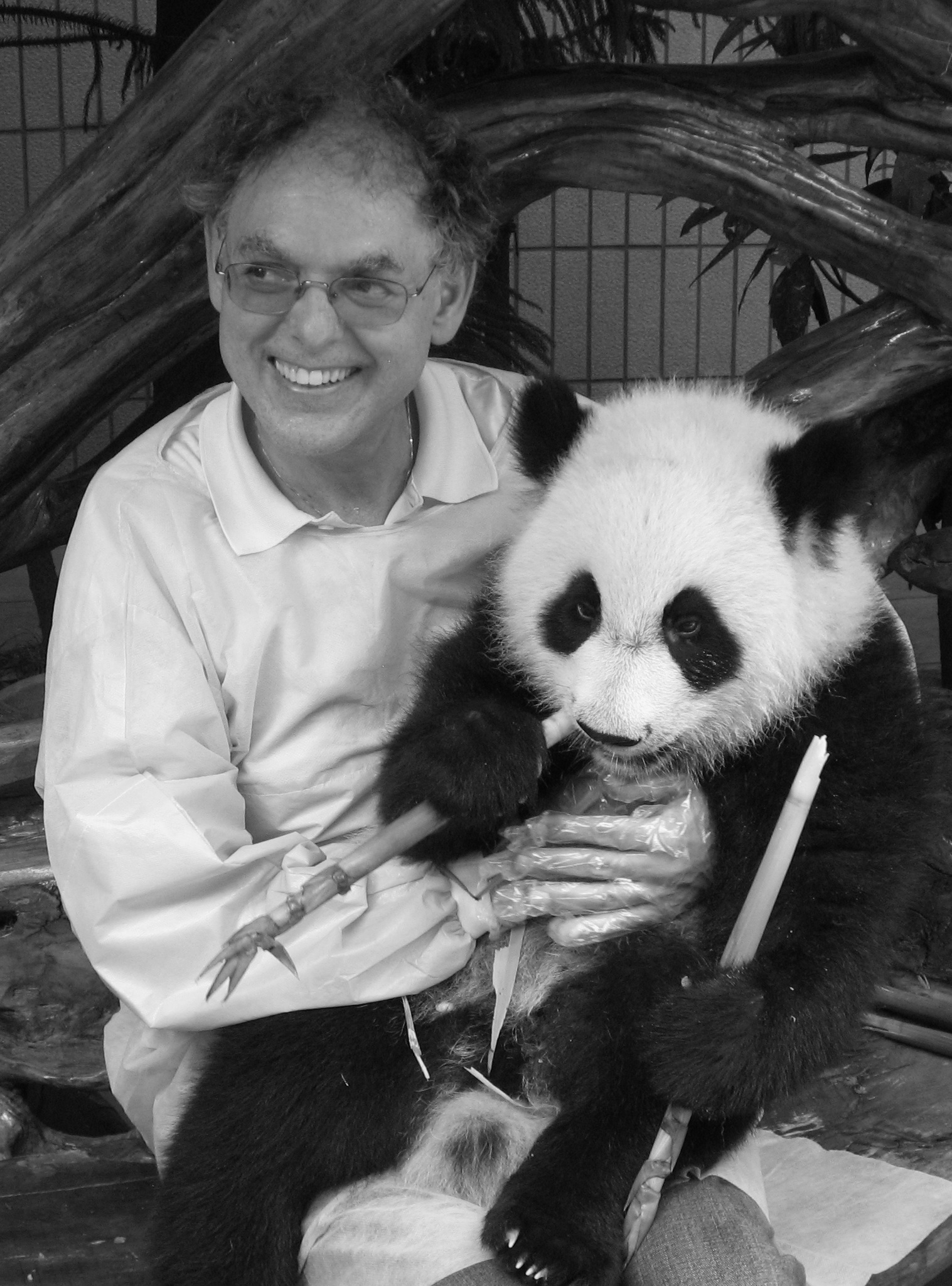
- Paul Schenly (left)

Background information
- Born: April 15, 1948 (age 78); Munich, Germany
- Occupation: Pianist

Paul Schenly (born April 15, 1948) is an American classical pianist. He is the founder and director of the summer music festival Pianofest in the Hamptons. He is the artistic director of the Cleveland International Piano Competition and was the head of the piano department at the Cleveland Institute of Music.

== Early life and education ==
Paul Schenly was born in Munich in 1948. He lived in South America before coming to the United States at the age of five. He holds a master's degree from the Cleveland Institute of Music, where he studied with Victor Babin. Schenly is an alumnus of the Music Academy of the West where he attended the piano programme in 1964, 1965 and 1969.

== Career ==
Winner of the Avery Fisher Career Grant, Schenly has been a soloist with a number of major United States orchestras, including the Atlanta Symphony Orchestra, the Cleveland Orchestra, the Chicago Symphony Orchestra, the Los Angeles Philharmonic, the San Francisco Symphony, and the New York Philharmonic. He made two United States tours with the Rotterdam Philharmonic Orchestra and toured with the same orchestra in Europe. He has appeared in many summer festivals, including repeated performances at the Hollywood Bowl, the Ravinia Festival, Blossom Music Center, and the Mostly Mozart Festival.

Schenly appeared in the Great Performers Series at Lincoln Center, the Royal Concertgebouw, Royal Albert Hall, and in acclaimed recitals at Carnegie Hall. He has performed with many of the world's leading conductors, including Christoph Eschenbach, James Levine, Erich Leinsdorf, Christoph von Dohnányi, Zubin Mehta, Lorin Maazel, Edo de Waart, Mstislav Rostropovich, Robert Shaw, Aaron Copland, Michael Tilson Thomas, and Kiril Kondrashin.

Schenly has been on the juries of several national and international competitions, and his students have won national and international prizes. He has been on the jury of the Beethoven Competition in Bonn and Mozart Competition in Salzburg. He is on the advisory board of the American Pianists Foundation and on the nominating committee for the Gilmore Piano Foundation. He has recorded for Sine Qua Non and RCA.

Schenly is the artistic director of the Cleveland International Piano Competition. He is also an artist in residence at the Cleveland Institute of Music, where he was the chairman of the piano department for over 25 years.

== Pianofest ==
Schenly founded Pianofest in the Hamptons in 1989.

== Personal ==
Schenly lives in Cleveland and New York City and, during the summer, in East Hampton, New York.

== See also ==
- Cleveland Institute of Music
