= Nadine Sierra =

American music performer (born 1988)

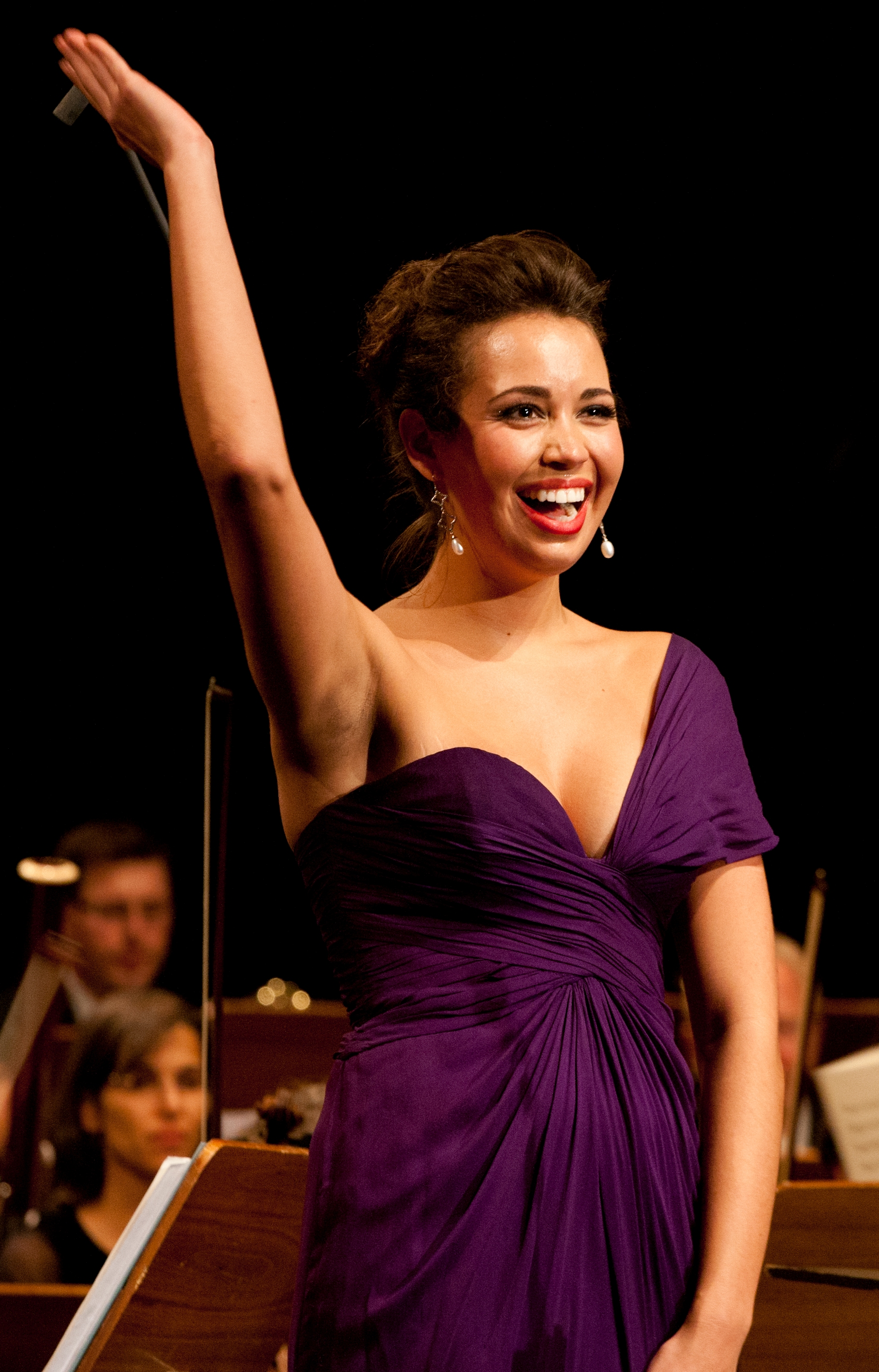
Nadine Sierra in 2013

Nadine Sierra (born May 14, 1988) is an American soprano. She is best known for her interpretation of Gilda in Verdi's Rigoletto, and Lucia in Donizetti's Lucia di Lammermoor. Currently performing in leading roles in the top opera houses around the world, she received the 1st Prize and People's Choice Award 2013 at the Neue Stimmen competition, is the 2017 Richard Tucker Music Foundation Award Winner, and was awarded the Beverly Sills Artists Award in 2018. Her debut album on the Universal Music Group label, There's a Place for Us, was released on August 24, 2018, and her second album, Made for Opera, was released March 4, 2022.

== Biography ==
A native of Fort Lauderdale, Florida, she trained at The Mannes College of Music and with Marilyn Horne at the Music Academy of the West, where she was the youngest person to win the Marilyn Horne Foundation Vocal Competition. She became a Young Artist with the Palm Beach Opera when she was fourteen, and made her operatic debut there two years later as the Sandman in Engelbert Humperdinck's Hansel and Gretel.

On January 29, 2004, when she was fifteen, she appeared in the National Public Radio show From the Top in Atlanta, Georgia, performing "O mio babbino caro" from Gianni Schicchi. She was invited back to From the Top, appearing on February 12, 2010, in Burlington, Vermont, when she sang “Ah, Je veux vivre!” from Roméo et Juliette by Charles Gounod. Marilyn Horne provided commentary.

She appeared at the United States Supreme Court Building in May 2009, where she sang solo and with Thomas Hampson in the Justices' Chambers. In 2009, she competed in Helsinki, Finland, in the Mirjam Helin International Competition, where she was awarded second place. She had her debut concert in Helsinki, Finland in 2009. In October 2009, she performed in the Marilyn Horne Mediterranean Cruise to Italy, Croatia, Turkey, and Greece. In March 2010, she performed at the Musashino Hall, Tokyo, Japan.

Sierra appeared as the Princess with Gotham Chamber Opera's production of Xavier Montsalvatge's opera El gato con botas at the New Victory Theater. In January 2011, she returned to Palm Beach Opera's Orfeo ed Euridice in the title role. In May 2011, she appeared as Tytania in Boston Lyric Opera's A Midsummer Night's Dream. In January 2011, Sierra became a San Francisco Opera Adler Fellow, and the following May appeared in the company's premiere of Christopher Theofanidis' opera Heart of a Soldier, with Thomas Hampson in the lead role. In January 2012, she appeared as Gilda in Florida Grand Opera's Rigoletto, and in 2013 at Teatro San Carlo in Naples, in the same role.

Sierra is featured in the book Driven: Six Incredible Musical Journeys, in which author Nick Romeo devoted one of the chapters ("Journeys") to her.

In January 2016, she performed at Venice New Year's Concert with Stefano Secco, and at Milan's fabled La Scala as Gilda in Rigoletto with Leo Nucci.

In January 2017, she sang in the New Year's Concert at Palermo's Teatro Massimo, followed in March by six performances as Ilia in Mozart's Idomeneo at the Metropolitan Opera in New York. In January 2019, she sang in the New Year's Concert at Venice's Teatro La Fenice.

In 2017, she was named Richard Tucker Music Foundation Award Winner, and performed to great critical acclaim at the December 10th Gala. Sierra performed in the Concert de Paris under the Eiffel Tower in July 2017. Her 2017/2018 highlights include Susanna in Mozart's Le Nozze di Figaro at The Metropolitan Opera, solo recitals in Dallas and New York City, a tour with Andrea Bocelli, Nannetta in Verdi's Falstaff at the Staatsoper Berlin, and Norina in Don Pasquale at the Opéra National de Paris. In 2018, she was named the Beverly Sills Artist Award Winner in a ceremony held at the Metropolitan Opera.

She is a Universal Music Group artist with a solo album, There's a Place for Us, which was released August 24, 2018 on Deutsche Grammophon. In 2022, her Violetta in the Metropolitan Opera production of La Traviata was hailed as showing Sierra's "innate sense of style and line that recalls Italian sopranos of the past, with decadent rubatos that fall on just the right side of indulgence."

== Awards ==
Sierra has been awarded the following awards and scholarships:

- National Foundation for Advancement in the Arts, Miami, Florida – Vocal Silver Award 2006
- Palm Beach Opera Vocal Competition, West Palm Beach, Florida – First Place Junior Division 2007
- The Marilyn Horne Foundation Vocal Competition, Santa Barbara, California – First Place Award 2007
- National Society for Arts and Letters Vocal Competition, Bloomington, Indiana – Second Place Award 2008
- The Metropolitan Opera National Council Auditions, New York City – Grand Finalist Winner 2009
- Florida Grand Opera Competition, Miami, Florida – Junior Division First Place Award 2009
- Licia Albanese–Puccini International Competition, New York, NY – Third Place Award 2009
- Gerda Lissner Foundation Competition, New York City – First Place 2010
- Richard Tucker Foundation, New York City – 2010 Sara Tucker Study Award Winner
- George London Foundation Competition, New York City First Place 2010
- Loren Zachary Foundation International Competition, Los Angeles, California – First Place 2010
- The Leonore Annenberg Award Fellowship in the Performing Arts, 2011
- Stella Maris International Music Competition 2011, Audience Prize
- The Veronica Dunne International Singing Competition, Dublin, 2013
- Neue Stimmen, Gütersloh, Germany – 1st Prize and People's Choice Award 2013
- Richard Tucker Music Foundation Award Winner, 2017
- Beverly Sills Artists Award Winner, 2018

== Recordings ==
- Made for Opera, 2022, Deutsche Grammophon
- Rigoletto, 2017, Delos
- There's a Place for Us, 2018, Deutsche Grammophon
- La Sonnambula, 2025 HD video, Met Opera on Demand
