= John Brancy =

American opera singer (born 1988)

- Born: 14 November 1988 (age 37); Upper Darby, Pennsylvania, US
- Occupation: Operatic baritone
- Years active: 2011–present
- Website: johnbrancy.com

John Brancy (born November 14, 1988) is an American operatic baritone performing with leading opera companies around the world. He is of Polish, German, English and Scottish descent.

== Early life and education ==
Brancy was born in Upper Darby, Pennsylvania, to Margaret and Michael Brancy. He has a younger sister, Jenna, a visual artist Brancy started voice lessons with Marvin Keenze in 2005. He grew up in the Mullica Hill section of Harrison Township, New Jersey and graduated from Clearview Regional High School in 2007. He continued his education at The Juilliard School where he completed his Bachelor of Music (studying voice with Cynthia Hoffmann) and a Graduate Diploma under the voice tutelage of Edith Wiens, who he continues to study with.

== Career ==
During the 2012/13 season, Brancy made his professional operatic debut with the Dresden Semperoper, singing the role of Fiorello in Rossini's Il barbiere di Siviglia. While still an undergraduate student at the Juilliard School, Brancy made his debuts at Carnegie Hall and David Geffen Hall (formerly known as Avery Fisher Hall) as the baritone soloist in Fauré's Requiem, Mozart's Coronation Mass, and Schubert's Mass in G. He was the winner of the 2010 Juilliard School Honors Recital Competition and in the following year made his Alice Tully Hall debut, with pianist Brian Zeger. Brancy is a recent first prize winner of the Jensen Foundation competition and has received the Sullivan Foundation Grand Prize and career grant, first prize at the Classical Singer Magazine Competition, the Gold Award for Voice at the YoungArts Foundation competition. He was a 2nd Place winner in the Liederkranz Competition in 2010, and in the Gerda Lissner Foundation Competition in 2011, and a laureate of the 2012 Montreal International Music Competition. He is the 2013 winner of the Marilyn Horne Song Competition. In 2020, he received a Grammy Award for his work in Fantastic Mr. Fox. During the 2021-22 NHL season Brancy frequently sang the national anthem before the start of New York Rangers home games, including throughout the team's playoff run.

In July 2023 he created the dual roles of the Artisan/Collector in the world premiere of George Benjamin's opera Picture a Day Like This at the 2023 Festival d'Aix-en-Provence.

== Repertoire ==
Brancy's repertoire includes:

- Figaro, The Marriage of Figaro (Mozart)
- Papageno, Die Zauberflöte (Mozart)
- Fantastic Mr. Fox, Fantastic Mr. Fox (Tobias Picker)
- Malatesta, Don Pasquale (Donizetti)
- Demetrius, A Midsummer Night's Dream (Britten)
- Harlekin, Ariadne auf Naxos (Strauss)
- Morales, Dancairo, Carmen (Bizet)
- Dandini, La Cenerentola (Rossini)
- Slook, La cambiale di matrimonio (Rossini)
- Sonora, La fanciulla del West (Puccini)
- Tantale, Apollon, La descente d'Orphée aux enfers (Charpentier)
- Eugene Onegin Eugene Onegin (Tchaikovsky)
- Albert Werther (Massenet)
- Billy Bigelow Carousel (Rodgers)
- Steward Flight (Dove)
- Artisan/Collector Picture a Day Like This (Benjamin)
