= Dina Kuznetsova =

Russian opera singer

- Born: May 1970 (age 56); Moscow, Soviet Union
- Occupations: Opera singer, soprano
- Years active: 1999–present
- Website: dinakuznetsova.com

Dina Kuznetsova (born May 1970) is an American lyric dramatic operatic soprano of Russian descent who has appeared in leading roles on the stages of international opera houses from New York to Sydney. She has focused on Italian and Slavic repertoires. Her signature roles include Tatyana in Tchaikovsky's Eugene Onegin, Desdemona in Verdi's Otello, Cio-Cio San in Madama Butterfly by Puccini, the title role in Dvořák's Rusalka, and Kátya in Kátya Kabanová by Janáček.

== Biography and training ==
Dina Kuznetsova was born in Moscow, Soviet Union. As a child she sang in Britten's opera for children, Let's Make An Opera, at the Moscow Chamber Musical Theatre. It was there that Kuznetsova fell in love with opera. She trained as a pianist at the Academic Music College of the Moscow Conservatory. Then she received her vocal training at the Oberlin Conservatory of Music under Marlene Rosen and Mary Schiller. In 1999 Kuznetsova won the Marilyn Horne Foundation Vocal Competition, which resulted in her New York debut recital in 2000. An alumna of the Ryan Opera Center at the Lyric Opera of Chicago, Kuznetsova performed title roles in a number of new productions at the Lyric Opera of Chicago, including Juliette (Roméo et Juliette by Gounod), Gilda (Rigoletto by Verdi), and the Vixen (The Cunning Little Vixen by Janáček).

== Career in opera ==
Dina Kuznetsova came to international attention in 2002, when she sang Donna Anna (Don Giovanni by Mozart) with Daniel Barenboim at the Berlin State Opera. Since then she has sung at the world's leading operatic venues, among them the Metropolitan Opera in New York, the Vienna State Opera, the Royal Opera House in London, the Bavarian State Opera in Munich, the Lyric Opera of Chicago, the San Francisco Opera, the English National Opera, and the Bolshoi Theatre in Moscow.

In 2007 Dina Kuznetsova made her Royal Opera, Covent Garden debut as Lauretta in a new Richard Jones production of Gianni Schicchi (Puccini) conducted by Antonio Pappano and opposite Bryn Terfel. The 2009 season was highlighted by Kuznetsova debut at the Glyndebourne Festival Opera, UK as Alice Ford in a new Richard Jones production of Falstaff (Verdi), conducted by Vladimir Jurowski. In 2011 she made her highly acclaimed debut as Dvořák's Rusalka at the Glyndebourne Festival Opera in Melly Still's production conducted by Sir Andrew Davis. Kuznetsova sang Cio-Cio-San for her debut at English National Opera (ENO) in Anthony Minghella's production under Gianluca Marciano. In 2013 Kuznetsova sang Rusalka at Teatro di San Carlo in Naples.

Tatyana in Tchaikovsky's Eugene Onegin has become a signature role for Dina Kuznetsova. She first sang this role at Lyric Opera of Chicago under Sir Andrew Davis opposite Dmitri Hvorostovsky and Mariusz Kwiecien. "As Tatyana, Dina Kuznetsova augmented her fine musicianship with an earnestness and sincerity that made her role as believable as Hvorostovsky's Onegin. This was a defining performance, not only in the context of the opera, but also for Kuznetsova, who raised the standard for Tatyana at Lyric Opera and elsewhere." Since that debut, subsequent performances as Tatyana have included a co-production with the Opera de Lille, as well as productions of the Opera Theatre of St. Louis, Opera Carolina, and Florida Grand Opera.

Kuznetsova performed the title role in Kátya Kabanová with New Zealand Opera (2017) and Hamburg State Opera (2013). She joined Municipal Theatre of Santiago production of Jenůfa by Janáček (2017) and Rusalka by Dvořák (2015).

In 2015/2016 season Dina Kuznetsova returned to her hometown of Moscow as Handel's Rodelinda at the Bolshoi Theatre under Christopher Moulds. The Bolshoi Theatre's production of Rodelinda, featuring Dina Kuznetsova as Rodelinda, has been awarded the Golden Mask Award for Best Opera Production.

Kuznetsova has performed lead roles opposite Cecilia Bartoli, Dmitri Hvorostovsky, Bryn Terfel, Frank Lopardo, Matthew Polenzani, Rolando Villazon, Piotr Beczala, David Daniels.

Throughout her career she has focused on interpreting art song with a close association with the New York Festival of Song, the Chamber Music Society of Lincoln Center, the Music@Menlo festival, as well as numerous other chamber-music festivals.

Ms. Kuznetsova has taught at the Cleveland Institute of Music since 2018. In that time her students have won numerous awards at national and international competitions.

== Recordings and awards ==
- Verdi: Falstaff (Glyndebourne, 2009), DVD/Blu-Ray, Opus Arte
- The Metropolitan Opera HD Live, 2013. Zandonai: Francesca da Rimini
- Verdi&Shakespeare, Falstaff, 2016. DVD/Blu-Ray, Opus Arte
- Russia - Eastern Europe I (2004), CD Music@Menlo Live
- Russia - Eastern Europe II (2004), CD Music@Menlo Live
- Russia - Eastern Europe III (2004), CD Music@Menlo Live
- Russian Reflections, Vol. 1, 2016, CD Music@Menlo Live,
- Russian Reflections, Vol. 4, 2016, CD Music@Menlo Live
- Dina Kuznetsova on Apple Music
- 1999 - The Marilyn Horne Foundation Award (1999)
- 2017 - Golden Mask Award, the Best Opera production, Rodelinda, Bolshoi Theatre

== Sources ==
- Personal Site of Dina Kuznetsova
- Dina Kuznetsova Profile at HarrisonParrott: International Artist Agency
- Dina Kuznetsova Biography on the Bolshoi Theatre site
- Dina Kuznetsova at Musical World
- IMDb: Dina Kuznetsova
- Operabase: Dina Kuznetsova
- Opera Musica: Dina Kuznetsova, soprano
- Uzan International Artists: Dina Kuznetsova Profile
- Mike Telin. A conversation with soprano Dina Kuznetsova ClevelandClassical.com Apr 24,2018.
- Kuznetsova at the CIM
