= Catherine Hewgill =

Australian cellist

Catherine Hewgill (born 1963) is an Australian cellist. Since 1990 she has been the principal cellist of the Sydney Symphony Orchestra. As a chamber musician she was a founding member of the Novalis Quartet and has recorded with The Australian Trio for ABC Classics.

== Life and career ==
Hewgill grew up in Perth. Her father was an academic and both her parents were amateur musicians. As a child she began playing a 3/4 size cello given to her by a family friend and shortly thereafter began formal studies in Perth with Jill Cole, a cellist with the West Australian Symphony Orchestra. In 1978 her father's work took the family to London for a year where she studied at the Royal College of Music with Eileen Croxford. After graduating from high school in Perth, she attended the University of Southern California's Thornton School of Music where she was a student of Gabor Rejto and received her Bachelor of Music in cello performance in 1985.

Hewgill continued her studies at the Aspen Music Festival and the Music Academy of the West and had private tuition from Mstislav Rostropovich and William Pleeth. In 1988 after touring Europe with I Solisti Veneti, she returned to her native Australia, initially as a cellist with the Australian Chamber Orchestra. She joined the Sydney Symphony Orchestra in 1989 and in 1990 became the orchestra's Principal Cellist. That same year she became a founding member of the Novalis Quartet, a string quartet which specialised in the music of the Romantic era.

She had a 14-month forced career hiatus when she fell outside the Sydney Opera House in 2001 while carrying her cello, a 1729 Carlo Tononi. The cello was unscathed, but all the bones in one wrist were crushed. After months of surgery and rehabilitation, Hewgill returned to the concert stage as a soloist in November 2002 with a performance of Brahms' Double Concerto with the Sydney Symphony Orchestra. In addition to her orchestral and chamber work, she has served as an adjudicator for the inaugural Australian Cello Awards and has given masterclasses at the Australian National Academy of Music.

Hewgill is married to a cinematographer. The couple have two children, a son and daughter.

== Recordings ==
Hewgill's recordings with The Australian Trio include:

- Saint-Saens: The Complete Piano Trios. 2008, ABC Classics
- The Australian Trio: A Piano Trio Anthology, 2006, ABC Classics

With the Sydney Symphony Orchestra:

- Tchaikovsky: Piano Concerto No 2, Romance, Song Without Words, Humoresque (SSO)
