= Katharina Thoma =

German opera stage director and academic teacher

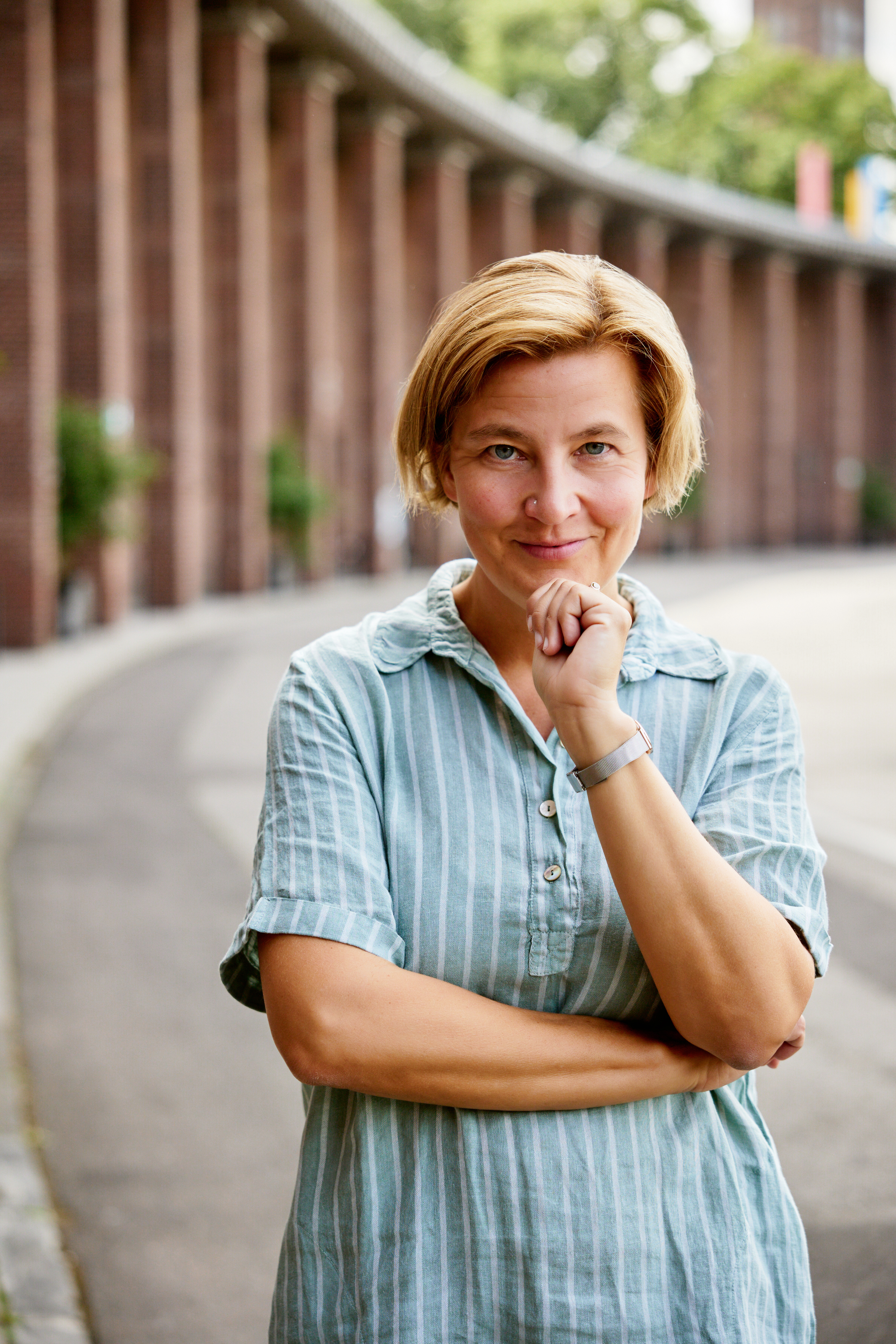
- Born: Katharina Thoma; 14 July 1975 (age 50)
- Education: Musikhochschule Lübeck
- Occupation: Opera director

Katharina Thoma (born 14 July 1975) is a German opera stage director and academic teacher who has worked freelance in Germany and Europe.

== Life and career ==
Thoma studied first piano and music pedagogy at the Musikhochschule Lübeck. She began work as assistant to stage directors at the Staatstheater Kassel and the Oper Frankfurt, working with Richard Jones, Christof Loy and Keith Warner, among others. She achieved a second prize at the 2007 European Camerata Nuova competition, and then directed Samuel Barber's Vanessa at the Malmö Opera. She became recognised for including contemporary elements in classical works.

She has worked freelance from 2008, including at major houses in Europe such as the Royal Opera House in London, the Opéra national du Rhin in Strasbourg, the Royal Swedish Opera in Stockholm, the Folkoperan there, and the Gothenburg opera house. She directed at festivals including the Glyndebourne Festival and the Munich Biennale. In Germany, she directed in Frankfurt and Kassel, at the Leipzig Opera, the Cologne Opera, the Opernhaus Dortmund, and the Staatstheater Karlsruhe. She staged works by Mozart, Wagner and Verdi. In 2024, she directed the first production in Frankfurt of Offenbach's Die Banditen, supplying a new translation into German.

Thoma lectured scenic direction at the Hochschule für Musik Mainz from 2008 to 2012. She has been professor at the Hochschule für Musik Würzburg from 2019 where she has directed the opera school.
