= Hollywood Independent Music Awards =

Award organization

- Awarded for: Independent music
- Location: Hollywood, California
- Country: United States
- First award: 2023
- Website: www.himawards.com

The Hollywood Independent Music Awards (HIMA) is an awards organization and annual ceremony recognizing independent artists, composers, songwriters, record labels, and studio recording audio engineers for their creative contributions to independent music. The independent music categories originated as part of the HMMAs, an awards event honoring original music in visual media including film, television, video games, documentaries, short films, and music videos.

The HMMA organization has recognized numerous composers, songwriters, and performers, including Billie Eilish, Rihanna, Olivia Rodrigo, Diane Warren, Ludwig Göransson, Danny Elfman, Hans Zimmer, and Austin Butler.

Since its inception, the HIMA's has attracted international participation from independent artists and industry professionals, providing a platform for emerging and established talent within the global independent music community. Hosting a separate awards show for independent artists was decided by founder Brent Harvey after an increased engagement from independent artists internationally. The first inaugural HIMA ceremony was held on August 17, 2023.

The HIMA's also held its "Everything Blue" portion of the awards ceremony at the International Bluegrass Music Hall of Fame in Owensboro, Kentucky, honoring independent artists in blues and bluegrass music, on August 12, 2023. The event was hosted by the Voice's Season 18 winner, Todd Tilghman.

== 2026 Winners and nominees ==
=== Categories ===
Adult Contemporary	Adult Contemporary Hip Hop
Jasmine Crowe, Keith Weidner, Blake Buentelo; Astrella; Brandon Jarrett; CXC; Katherine Larsen; ODELLA; Shelita	PM; DM-Punch; MvkeyyJ, Spencer Kane; REXXX-L; TWAIN
Album	Alternative
MODULA - The Unmentionables: Book I; ALTER - "Una Noche Más"; David Lanz - "Carousel"; James Viggo Poulsen - "Heartland Poem"; Lachi - "Magnificent"; O&D - "Caimito"; Sarahlyn - "Love Letters"; Tanya George - "Contrast"; The Earth & All Within - "The Earth & All Within"	Flyght Club; hachajah; Luke Truan, Katerina Souponetsky, Mona Zaki; Modern Nights; Piper Connolly; Simon Rivón; Syante; The Velvet Hands; VETZ
Americana/Roots	Blues
Tina Petteras; Dave Kirkman; Four Piece Suit; Kris Angelis; Lucie Tiger; Midnight Sky; Walter Hansen	Stevie Hawkins; Abbie Thomas; Bluesnado; Jorge Granda; Kris Angelis
Children's music	Christian/Gospel
Mallory J. Stevens and Brandon Jarrett (performed by Brandon Jarrett and Joe Abraham); Dana; David Majzlin and Juliane Jones (feat. Lily Bell Morgan); Jesse Jukebox; Mr Daddy Cool; Tess Cacciatore & Davy Nathan (sung by April Henry)	Vanessa Béjine; Randall Cohen; Reina Özbay; The Darkness Lies; Tim Cord
Contemporary Classical	Country Classic
David Arkenstone & Budapest Scoring Orchestra; Christopher Siu & Budapest Scoring Orchestra; Cameron Stone, Czech National Symphony Orchestra, Kristin Amarie, David Lanz; David Das & Budapest Scoring Orchestra (feat. Bob Sheppard on tenor saxophone); Fabian Kratzer; Forrest Gray; Jennifer Thomas & Glen Gabriel; Matt Cook; Sharon Farber; Yi-Chen Chiang	Dave Kirkman; Jacki Daniels (feat. Louie Lee); Lucie Tiger; Shevyn Roberts; Steve Bridgmon; Tommy O’Keeffe
Country Crossover	Dance
Black Sands; Austin Martin; Bigg Souf; Cornelius Versa; D.J. Rittenhouse; Haleigh Martin; Kris Anders; Shevyn Roberts; Trey Bryant; Walter Hansen	Sangina; Jordan Massey; Pierce Brian Brown; Ralphy Grey featuring Craymo; Steven Binko; UTCA
EDM	Folk/Acoustic
Heretixx, Ricki Ayela, Johnny; Daphne Tetreault Feat. Farrah Maunste; Heretixx, Ricki Ayela, Johnny; Kendra Erika; Lachi; ODELLA; Ralphy Grey featuring Craymo; Rogelami	Hunter Hawkins; Alsindi; Black Sands; Daniel de Boer; Lily Erin; Morgan Coblentz; Sarah Rose; The King’s Way; Todd Mosby
Holiday	Instrumental
Thomas James and Bill Walter; Abbie Thomas; AMARU; ARYIEL; Corry Hanna; Jamie Alimorad; Mela Bee; Rollin Jewett; The Diversions Featuring Lia Booth	Adam Werner (feat. Will Ackerman & Michael Manring); André Barros; Chris Thomas; David Laborier; E J Ouellette; Inbal Cohen-Rasner; Jim Kimo West and David Vito Gregoli; Taisuke Kimura; moja McNeish
Jazz (Jazz fusion/Bebop)	Jazz (Smooth/Cool)
Paul Wayne Rucker; David Laborier; Gregory Golub; Kobi Arad (feat. Kiki Valera & Charlie Sabach); Vahagn Stepanyan	Tommy Davidson; Jeff Greenleaf; Suzanne Grzanna; Threestyle (feat. Magdalena Chovancova, Gabriela Konrad, Robert Fertl); Todd Mosby; Tommy Davidson; Yulia (feat. Jackiem Joyner)
Latin	Lyrics/Lyricist
Alexander James Rodriguez; BenAnthony LaVoz; Danny Pryp; Eme featuring Yeziel, EC Bandido; Geann Alberto; Jordan Massey; Max Rosado; Nia Padilla; Santiago Vasquez; Tatiana Liary & Hada Veronica	Moana Avvenenti; CEEHUDD, KOS; Frances Tan; Moana Avvenenti; Rehya Stevens; Wendy Babcock
Message Song/Social Impact	New Age Ambient
Sumi X; Arden Alexa; Class Vee; Marcus Kley; STEFANO; Sumi X; Wendy Loomis	Bei Bei; Apstara; Aritra C; Chet Nichols; Chris Thomas; D Brax; David Sálezmar; Harmony Kang; Michel Huygen; Mingo; Sylion
Original Recording	Original Song
All I Need (produced by Tariq Pijning, performed by Jermaine Fleur; "I’m Lovin’ Me" (produced by Turra Medina, performed by Sarahlyn); "My Favorite Things Are Red" (produced by Simon Jay and Luke Shrestha, performed by Arden Alexa); "Replay" (produced by Aidana Maxutova & Yerlan Bekchurin, performed by Sangina); "What Can’t Be Changed (2026 Version)" (produced by Si Min Tan, Axel Hejlsberg, Mike Cervantes, performed by Frances Tan); "Uncontrollable" (produced by Nick Stone, performed by ĒISA)	Really Do (written and performed by Ella Loretta); "Tears Fall On Hollywood" (written by Shauvik Sharan, performed by Flyght Club); "Beautiful Mystery" (written by Jasmine Crowe and Keith Weidner, performed by Jasmine Crowe, Keith Weidner, Blake Buentelo); "AMAR" (written by Kristin Amarie and David Lanz, performed by Kristin Amarie, David Lanz, Jay Dref); "Here’s Your Proof" (written by Leonie Persch, Carlee Chapell, Jacob Munk, performed by Leonie Persch); "Circles" (written by Talib Matin and Michael Washington, performed by MvkeyyJ); "Poker Face" (written and performed by Sophie Pecora)
Pop	R&B/Soul
Kayla Krilove; Jermaine Fleur; Lourde Childs; Mily Osuna; Natalie Kalei; Sophie Pecora	Rayl; Dre Boogie; Flyght Club; KIA; MODULA (feat. Day Underscore and Jayna Elise); Tracy Cruz; Trent Monroe and Bryard Huggins; TWAIN
Rap/Hip Hop	Rock
Jaydoce; Dorian Robinson, Seth Sutch & Reed Starks; Jaydoce; KKOKO; MvkeyyJ; TWAIN; Yacovelli	* Phil X and The Drills; Ashton Martin x 1DRU; Francesca Tarantino; Go Scarlet; Randy Caserta; Silent Susan; Simon Oakley; The Sun Harmonic; The Velvet Hands
Rock/Heavy Metal	Rock/Pop
Magnetico; Angels on the Battlefield; Low Speed Chase; Morningstar; One World (R)evolution; Scarred Soul Empire	Lauren Ash; AITA; Astrella; Dina Dove; Jon Mullane; Jules & the Howl; Katie Costello; Larry May; Lauren Ash; Signal For Pilot; Socialghosts
Singer-Songwriter	Vocal (female)
NAVY; Alexis Strum; Ann King; Astrella; Jasmine Crowe, Keith Weidner; Kate Loraine; Katie Cole; Neena Rose; Rafi; Sāde Frame	Katherine Larsen; Ann King; FH.Dhanagom, SANGINA; Haleigh Martin; Kristin Amarie; CherylAn Sokol-Byrne, Brianna Shelko; Monika Spruch; NAVY
Vocal (male)	World
Lourde Childs; Brandon Jarrett; Cornelius Versa; Jermaine Fleur; Mokita; Nam Jonez	Annie Zhou; AcoTakenaka; Annie Zhou; Dr. Krupesh Thacker, Vacha Thacker, Parv Thacker, Parv Fusion Band, The Krup; Ganna Sorbat and David Majzlin; Guy Renardeau Feat Sara Parsaei; Layla Minoui; Marcus Kley; SIBONGIE 嬉班子樂團; Sweet Toko ft. KIA; Wouter Kellerman & David Arkenstone featuring Mbuso Khoza

=== Studio recording professionals ===
Producer/Production	Mixing/Engineering
hachajah; David Je’; Dawn Elder; H.B. Thal and Colby Lapolla; Scott R. Hansen; Uncia; Vahagn Stepanyan; ZieM	TOKAL & Jennifer Ortiz; Akihisa Yorozu; David Laborier; Jeff Silverman; Robert Fertl

=== Music industry professionals ===
Record Label/Distributor	Publisher
Symphonic; Bigfork Bay Music LLC; Dreamland Entertainment Group; Legacy Music; MTS Records; Thirty Tigers	PEN Music Group, Inc.; Angry Mob Music; Byrne Elliott Music; Formosa Pipe Organ Society; Wixen Music

=== Special recognition ===
Afrobeats	Bluegrass music
TruRaw feat. Sandriana - "Tunapaa (We Rise)"	Adalyn Ramey - "Angel at the Crossroads"

== 2025 Winners and nominees ==
=== Categories ===
Adult Contemporary	Adult Contemporary Hip Hop
Brandon Jarrett – "I'm Not Sorry"; Ban Brothers (featuring Christine Corless) – "Nothin' Like This"; Black Sands – "Serotonin"; GALIT – "Dear Lover"; Mark Michael Garcia – "Your Love Is All I Know"; Michael Gilas – "Working with the Rain"; Monti The Artist – "Break The Ground"; Odella – "Hang On"; Stefano – "Celebration"	Abstract Mindstate – "Bar Louie" (featuring David Banner); Bo Paypershow – "Bad One"; Ervin Mitchell – "Nobody But Myself"; ETCETERA (featuring JMarv) – "Secret"; L.S. (ChildOfHipHop) (featuring Sunih Reed) – "Mama Knows"; TWAIN – "Brotherly Love"
Album	Alternative
Matt Cook & Dan Merceruio – "Braveship"; Cheryl B. Engelhardt & GEM – "According to the Moon"; Ignacio Salvatierra & Various Artists – "Onda Aldemaro De Ignacio Salvatierra P"; KIA – "Retrospect"; Lockwood Barr – "One Day I Will"; Nige B – "Reshape // Refashion"; Savannah Brister – "Soft"	Emilia Vaughn – "Draw on My Jeans"; Celeste Marie Wilson – "If I sin for you?"; Flyght Club – "Nobody Else Knows"; Jazzie Young – "Waiting on You!"; Lady Sloth – "Disaster"; Mary Ann – "Welcome"; Nicki Kris – "Unleashed"; Shannon K, Samir Bodhi, Nathalie Bonin – "Anxiety's Shadows"; Ships Have Sailed – "Breakdown"; Vetz – "Almas Gemelas"
Americana/Roots	Blues
Haleigh Martin – "State of Mine"; Last House – "Rock & Roll Me"; Reece in the Country – "Missing Pieces"; Silent Susan – "Cursing The Ohio"; Grant Maloy Smith (featuring Janis Ian) – "Memphis"; Cornbread Wallace – "Blue Collar Proud"; American Mile – "American Dream"; Adrian Sutherland – "My Rebel Spirit"	Last House – "Side Of The Road"; Abbie Thomas – "Bitch Make the Coffee"; Flyght Club – "Slow Burn"; Grant Maloy Smith – "All I Gotta Do"; Stevie Hawkins – "You Left Me With A Heartquake"; The Gravel Project – "Love the Life"
Children's music	Christian/Gospel
Yumi's Universe – "Chasin' The Sun"; Dana – "How (Can I Make Someone's Day)"; Guy Renardeau – "Play With Me"; Jesse Friedberg – "Afraid But Brave"; Linda Kartoz-Doochin – "Hot Latke"	Mohammed K Paika – "Just Human"; Byrne Elliott Music – "Ready to Begin"; Freedom Heart – "Dreaming With You"; Kyle Dillingham – "Eden Song"; Mo Dinka – "Heaven Won My Heart"; Muscle Shoals Allstars (featuring Gary Nichols) – "Gentle Waters"; Odella – "Hallelujah Moment"; Steven Bridgmon – "Called You Back Home"; We For Thee – "Awesome Mighty King"
Contemporary Classical	Country (Classic)
Daniel Fisher – "Fisher: Symphona No. 2"; Alexander Unseth – "Unseth: Symphonina No. 2 (Childhood Symphonina)"; Dallas String Quartet (featuring London Symphony Orchestra) – "Key of Heaven"; Helena Maria Falk – "Outside World"; Jasper Ku – "The Circle of Life"; Joseph Lu – "Pour Marie (Romance d'un Amour)"; Matias Bacoñsky – "Everything Ends"; Nan Avant – "Nani (beautiful) Lahaina~Rhapsody for Violin and Orchestra"; Ruiqi Zhao – "I Am Back"; Russ Hewitt & Irving Symphony Orchestra – "Amor Perdido (live)"	Lockwood Barr – "Tornado Tree"; Adalyn Ramey – "Small Town"; American Mile – "Straight From The Heartland"; Byrne Elliott Music (featuring Easton Hamlin) – "The House"; D Boone Pittman and Clark Kissick – "That's Low"; Dolylamby's posse – "Ain't That Kinda Country"; Ethan Johnson (featuring Rudy S) – "Rescue Me"; Lily Grace – "Old Enough To Know Better"; Myles Erlick – "Growing Old With You"; Nathan King – "Like Dirt"
Country (Crossover)	Dance
Lily Grace – "Me, Myself and Wine"; Austin Martin – "Wrangler"; Bronte Fall – "Worth The Money"; Cole Capshaw – "Tequila Sunset Kiss"; Haleigh Martin – "This One's on Me"; Haley Bundy – "In Love With Love Again"; Katie Perkins – "Keep On Dreaming"; Myles Erlick – "This Town"; Savannah Brister – "Limbo Land"; Three Highways – "Must've Done Something Right"	Kendra Erika – "Body Language"; Dream Tonic & Lucien Francis – "Side By Side"; Irene Michaels – "Feeling Free"; Ke'Andra & Jay Abe – "No Ashes Without Fire"; Kim Cameron – "Don't Look Back (Raf N Soul Mix)"
EDM	Folk/Acoustic
Denity & Zaryah – "Mars"; Amaru – "Este Hombre (El Tesoro)"; Bella Rabbit (featuring Spencer Ludwig) – "That Feeling"; Cris Gunther, Bashar, Luã Linhares – "Breaking Curses"; DeDe Lopez – "Universal Law"; Heretixx, Ricki Ayela, Johnny – "Is She the One"; Luna Pan – "Higher"; Rogelami – "Infinity"	Abbie Thomas – "Mid July"; Byrne Elliott Music (featuring Ben Law) – "Before I Stayed"; Corry Hanna – "Rollin' On"; Jessica Jarvis – "Shakespeare Street"; Juliet Piper – "We Loved (Revival)"; Reece in the Country – "I'd Crawl"; Susan Odella – "Glass"
Holiday	Instrumental
The Diversions (featuring Lia Booth) – "Fall In Love This Christmas"; Bella Rabbit – "Your Way (Back Home)"; Brianna Shelko – "Only Wanna Be"; Chasing Sparrows (Kelsey Mira, Robin Sandoval) – "Forever This Christmas"; Roberto Tola (featuring Zorina Andall) – "Christmas For Sale"; Suzanne Grzanna – "Snow City XO"	Russ Hewitt – "Bajo El Sol (live)"; Amit May Cohen – "Prime Suspect"; David Arkenstone – "Ancient Magic Awakens"; David Laborier – "The Smoothness of You"; Ed Bazel – "Daybreak"; Jasper Ku – "The Circle of Life"; Joe Pisto – "Respiro"; Paul Khodor & CHUTNEY – "Sir Bunky"; Victor Angeleas – "Lamento Bachiano"; Yulia – "Isaiah 40:31"
Jazz (Jazz fusion/Bebop)	Jazz (Smooth/Cool)
Kobi Arad Band (feat. Lonnie Plaxico) – "Weave (Warping)"; Arman Peshtmaljyan – "Traffic Rage"; Peter Xifaras (featuring Justin Chart) – "Adagio Blue"; Sonny Greenwich Jr – "Together Alone"; Tomer George Cohen – "Friday Night Chant"; Victor Angeleas – "Tres Rios"	Roberto Tola – "Lightness"; Derek Frank – "Paradise Beach"; Latin Faculty (featuring Rebekka Blöndal) – "So Nice"; Pete Calandra & Straight Up – "Shades Of Life"; Suzanne Grzanna – "The Cat's Meow XO"; Unity Quartet – "Paloma Plage"
Latin Pop/Rock	Latin Traditional
Karina Magallon – "TTQA"; Alexander James Rodriguez – "Noche Sin Fin""; Chesca Musica – "Soy Humana"; ĒISA – "Hypnotic"; Miist – "Que la música te llene"; Louis Mikan – "Muestrate"	Estani (featuring Max Baca) – "Mi Suerte Ha Cambiado"; Giovany Revelle – "Maravillas"; Jesus Alejandro – "Mariana"; Marco Nodari – "El Secreto"; Roberto Tola – "From Rio To São Paulo"
Latin Tropical	Latin Urban/Hip Hop/Rap
Pacho Buscadoro (featuring Sofia) – "Papi"; Dominique Patrick Noel & Eduardo Padua (featuring Eddie Montalvo) – "Dame Tu Amistad"; JoAmber – "Nada De Ti"; Max Rosado – "Matarme suavemente"; Micky Cruz – "Este Ritmo"	Auggie Velarde – "Valora"; Bella Rabbit – "Cafeína"; J Star – "Muchas Botellas"; Jaycool Charisma – "Fantasia Sin Final"; Venus Leone – "Besame"
Lyrics/Lyricist	Message Song/Social Impact
Jessica Isenhour – "Shakespeare Street"; Abbie Thomas – "Mid July"; Devin Powers, Leah Silberman – "Heart Stop Doing That"; Natalie Jean – "What They Didn't See"; Sharon Cook – "What Do I Tell My Heart?"; Tim Tye – "A Few Good Years"	Wendy Babcock – "She Was Here"; Chasing Sparrows (Kelsey Mira, Robin Sandoval) – "Turn It Up"; Denise Gentilini & Lisa Nemzo – "Let Freedom Ring"; Irene Kelley – "Golden Days"; Katie Costello – "Unheard"; Michelle Langone – "The Key"; Mohammed K Paika – "Just Human"; Muscle Shoals Allstars (featuring Shane Henry) – "Good Light"
New Age/Ambient	Original Recording
Yulia (featuring Mariea Antoinette) – "Heaven"; Curtis Macdonald – "Spring's Redeeming Rain"; David Arkenstone – "Fairy Kingdom"; Dream Tonic – "Plume"; Ivan Ruiz Serrano – "Instrumental"; Mingo – "Dreams Of Radiation"	Muscle Shoals Allstars (featuring Shane Henry) – "Good Light" produced by Devin Powers; Dallas String Quartet (featuring London Symphony Orchestra) – "Brewing Conflict" produced by Ion Zanca; Leonie Persch – "Code Blue" produced by Simon Jay; Lily Grace – "I Don't Wanna Cry On My Birthday" produced by Michael and Caleb Flanders; Mirusia – What Do I Tell My Heart?" produced by Matt Cook & Noah Taylor; Arden Alexa – "Mess of You" produced by Simon Jay and Luke Shrestha; Raquel Aurilia – "When We Were Young" produced by Billy Smiley; Willow Seixas – "Jealous" produced by Dawn Elder
Original Song	Pop
Matilde G – "My Instincts Are Tragic" written by Matilde Girasole, Max Zachariah Cinnamon and Jonathan S Bluth; ĒISA – "Hypnotic" written by Isabella Brito and Jordyn Simone; Emilia Vaughn – "Limbo" written by Emilia Vaughn; Flyght Club – "Slow Burn" Written by Shauvik Sharan; Júlia Machado – "Girl Next Door" written by João Direitinho and Aurora Pinto; Leonie Persch – "Blindfolded" written by Leonie Persch, Simon Jay and Riley Urick; Lily Grace – "Me, Myself and Wine" written by Lily Grace, Scott Barrier and J4	Ariel Bellvalaire – "Til The Clock Strikes"; Black Sands – "Kid Sydney"; Carina – "Locked In"; Emilia Vaughn – "Rock Music, Girl Secrets"; Jared Henry – "Tattoo"; Kami Huff – "Never Met You"; Mariia Tsvetkova, Chris Wirsig – "Keep Your Secret"; memyself&vi & Chapters – "Farewell"; Palola – "Mar de Tus Ojos"; Sanjna – "Michelangelo"
R&B/Soul	Rap/Hip Hop
KIA (featuring Adam Wilson) – "Together"; Markey Blue – "Send Me Love"; Setoria – "Love You More"; Shining Rae – "Discretion (They Don't Need to Know)"; Ke'Andra & Jay Abe – "No Ashes Without Fire"; Jessica Betts – "She's Raw"; Jack Burns – "White Nikes"; Foam Collective (featuring Wayne Wilson) – "No Rules (I Don't Want to Grow Up)"; Carter Skyers – "Easiest Goodbye"	F. Mills – "Still"; Abstract Mindstate – "True Story" (featuring Simthandile Mtolo); Baybizzle – "Do My Dance"; David Je’ – "Shoulders"; J-Venom & Shelbei – "In The Mirror"; JildyT Hollywood Hippie (featuring Jade Josephine) – "Work My Magic"; KAYE – "Show Me Love"; Nige B – "Chase It" (featuring Dubbygotbars & Txreek)
Rock	Rock/Pop
Magnetico – "What's Left Of Us"; Angels on the Battlefield – "Modern Prometheus"; Francesca Tarantino – "Hold On To Me"; Hamish Anderson – "So Alive"; Harley Olivia – "You're Not Ready"; Jamie Alimorad – "Two Wrongs"; PowerVain – "Can't Stop Loving You (Scrapheart Blues)"	Nya – "My Tears Grew Roses"; BrandiWyne & Josh Kain – "Get Away"; Brianna Shelko – "Have Mercy"; Drea Albert & David Majzlin – "Champion"; Francesca Tarantino – "Not So Serious"; Hayes Warner – "Predator"; Jules & the Howl – "In The End"; Lauren Ash – "Whiplash"; Syante – "Downhill"
Singer-Songwriter	Vocal (Female)
Sophie Pecora – "Crime Scene"; Charles V. Rox Vaccaro – "Old Country Road"; Emily Judson (featuring Andrew Chappell) – "It's My Farm"; Flyght Club – "Slow Burn"; Mela Bee – "Dance & Cry"; Michelle Lockey – "Dig Deeper"; Nadia Lanfranconi – "So Done"; Pam Ross – "Two Shots of Tequila"	Ke'Andra – "No Ashes Without Fire"; Aivee Hsu – "But Beautiful"; Arden Alexa – "Break My Heart"; Bella Rabbit – "Your Way (Back Home)"; Drea Albert – "Champion"; Jules & the Howl – "In The End"; Leonie Persch – "Blindfolded"; Liyah bey – "Snow"; Lockwood Barr – "One Day I Will"; Sāde Frame – "L.L.L.L.Love"
Vocal (Male)	World
Stefano – "Fight For Love"; Brandon Jarrett – "I Can See Clearly Now"; Chase Bush – "Old Old House"; Evan Curran – "Good Enough For Me"; Jamie Alimorad – "Two Wrongs"; Muscle Shoals Allstars (featuring Gary Nichols) – "Gentle Waters"	Jjumba Lubowa Aligaweesa – "Stress"; Carlos Garo – "The Pharaoh"; CHUTNEY – "Der Heyser Bulgar"; Edu Vico – "Alazán"; Ganna Sorbat & David Majzlin – "Ashes and the Name"; Lourdes Carhuas – "Por esas trenzas"; Mohammadreza Ajdari – "Els"; Radhika Vekaria – "Liberate (Maha Mrityunjaya)"

=== Recording and Music Industry Professionals ===
Producer/Production	Mixing/Engineering
LATASHÁ; Luna Pan; Matt Cook & Noah Taylor; Scott R. Hansen; Tom Chandler & Ron Geffen; Zoë Lustri, H.B. Thal	Dream Tonic & Memory Code; Aritra C; Jill Tengan; S. J. Jananiy; SEAY & Jeff Silverman
Independent record label	Publisher
Break Records; Dreamland Entertainment; Foreign Family Collective; LMS Records; Powers Music; Winding Way Records	Reservoir Media; OML Sync; PEN Music Group, Inc.; Sounds Out Loud; TRO Essex Music Group

=== Special recognition ===
FENIX 360 Rising Star Award	Ghost Rocket Song Search
Sophia Angelica	Elle Márjá

=== Pre-selected winners ===
Afrobeats/Afropop	Bluegrass
Nigel B (featuring Txreek)	Debra Lyn
Reggae
The Irie

== 2024 Winners and nominees ==
=== Categories ===
Adult Contemporary	Adult Contemporary Hip Hop
Aaron Lazar & Josh Groben – "Let Your Soul Be Your Pilot"; Ban Brothers – "Move On"; Jessica Carter Altman – "Flashback"; Lachi, James Ian, and Gaelynn Lea – "Lift Me Up"; ODELLA – "Somewhere After Time"; Sun King Rising – "One More Story to Tell"; Velvet Halo – "Nothing Left"	Slum Village – "Factor" (featuring Eric Roberson); Abstract Mindstate – "True Story" (featuring Simthandile Mtolo); Benny the Butcher – "Big Dog" (featuring Lil Wayne); Little Simz – "Gorilla"; Masta Ace & Marco Polo – "P.P.E."; Rapsody – "Asteroids"
Afrobeats/Afropop	Album
Zinoleesky – "A1 (Feeling Disorder)"; Banwo – "JEJE"; Matt B – "Need Some Wine"; Mo Dinka – "Armor"; Septimius The Great – "Anything You Want"; Stormzy & Rema – "Hide and Seek" (Rema remix)	Billy Morrison – "The Morrison Project"; Brianna Shelko, Michael Maas, Jack Green, Kevin Gordon, Luke Truan – "Anything Is Possible"; D Boone Pittman – "Resurrection Noise"; DJ Preach & Jerry Cartier – "Housewarming"; Jennifer Thomas – "Oceans"; Petty Human Emotions – "Outside"; Slum Village – "F.U.N."; Valeree – "Interrupted"
Alternative	Americana/Roots
Ships Have Sailed – "Silence"; Ban Brothers – "Nothin' Gets Lost"; Brendalynn Mckinney, Tytanic & David Majzlin – "Nevermind" (featuring Tytanic); Emilia Vaughn – "Skeleton"; HVNTED – "FIEND"; Katy Tunbridge – "Lying Through Your Teeth"; Radio Drive – "Cast Out Your Light"	Cindy Morgan – "Jubilee" (featuring Tommy Sims); Chris App – "Brighter Skies" (featuring Benjamin Blythe); D Boone Pittman – "Love and Floods (and Other Natural Disasters)"; E J Ouellette & Odessa Settles – "Let Peace Flow"; Jeremy Parsons – "Life Worth Dyin' For"; Jim Vitale – "America's Road"; Shiny Shiny Black – "Stranger in My Own Town"; The Midnight Cowgirls – "Giddy Up"
Bluegrass	Blues
The Goodwin Brothers – "Don't Need Cuttin'"; Adalyn Ramey – "Lonesome Wind"; Cindy Morgan – "Free Peaches in Heaven" (featuring Marcus Hummon); Debra Lyn / Soulgrass – "You're Gonna Leave"; Edgar Loudermilk Band – "The Banks of the River"; Kentucky Shine – "Night Watch"	Andrew Moore and Hooch – "Come Home"; Antoine Dunn – "October 7th"; Arek Religa – "Devil's Road"; Justine Blazer & Lauren Anderson – "Ain't No Cure Like The Blues"; Corry Hanna – "Ain't Long For This World"
Christian/Gospel	Contemporary Classical
Leah Mojo Deluge Worship – "Treasure"; Adalyn Ramey – "Come See What God Can Do"; Marty DeRoche – "He's Here"; Mighty Men of Faith – "Celebrate"; Mo Dinka – "Can I Get A Witness"; Savannah Brister – "By My Side"; WE FOR THEE "Faith Like Jesus"	Jennifer Thomas – "Underwater Carnival Ride"; Adriano Aponte – "Queen's Speech"; Daniel Fisher – "Symphonina No. 1, Movement 1"; David Bertok – "Fontana dell'Anima"; Helena Maria Falk and the Norwegian Radio Orchestra – "Huldra's Dream"; Joseph Lu – "POUR MARIE (Romance d'un Amour)"; Kike Ega – "Enigma of Time"; Mirana Faiz – "Whispers of The Journey"
Country (Classic)	Country (Crossover)
Pamela Hopkins – "Walk of Honor"; 7 South (Written and Sung by Mike Blocker) – "Wonderin'"; Amy Taylor Music – "Tow Truck Jesus (20 Miles From Barstow)"; Bo Bice – "Born Of Heroes' Blood"; Cliff & Susan – "Neon Dreams"; Three Highways – "Must've Done Something Right"	Reyna Roberts – "Raised Right"; Alexandra Kay – "Everleave"; Alyssa Ruffin – "The Sacrifice"; Jennie Larsen – "Where Wildflowers Grow"; Presley Aronson – "Love For The Win" (feat. Jimmie Allen); Raquel Aurilia – "Mr. Right Now"; Shining Rae – "I Can't Help Who I Love"
Dance	EDM
Class Vee – "House Party"; Ian Honeyman – "Nights With You" (featuring James Carrington); Kim Cameron & Sax Diva – "Running Past the Line"; Rehya Stevens – "Let's Have Some Fun"; Rêve – "CTRL + ALT + DEL"; Valerie Giglio – "Yellowbird Swing"	LOSTBOYJAY – "Say Goodbye" (featuring Billy Raffoul); Adriano Aponte – "Stuff You Gotta Watch"; Chris App – "City Lights" – EDM Remix (featuring Alena & Hugo Lee); Denity x Zaryah – "The One"; Irene Michaels – "My Last Love"; Rogelami – "Turn Off the lights"
Folk/Acoustic	Holiday
Lilith Max – "Peasant's Throne"; Anna Josephine – "Oh, Joan"; J EDNA MAE – "Elephant"; memyself&vi x Chapters – "Snake Pit"; Michelle Lockey "Who Hears the Broken"; Teni Rane – "Goldenrod"	Lana Janjanin – "Be the Light"; "Superlight" (Spenser Day, Robin Sandoval) – "This Christmas, I'll Be Coming Home"; Brianna – "Christmas Is You"; Debe' Gunn & Afrika Mamas – "Christmas All Around the World"; Evergreen Song Factory & Melody Farm Music – "Christmasing With You"; Nam Jonez – "I want you for Christmas"
Instrumental	Jazz (Jazz fusion/Bebop)
Katie Hardyman – "Darling, Will You Dance With Me" feat. The European Recording Orchestra; Anthony Rodriguez – "Once of Love"; Ashton Brett Dunn – "Cherokee Shuffle"; Derek Frank – "Demon On Wheels"; E J Ouellette – "Roll Over O'Carolan" Carolan's Concerto; Joanne Lazzaro – "Ashes To Ireland"; Sarantos – "Old Town in Europe"; Taisuke Kimura – Taisuke Kimura	Tony Addison – "Cool Breeze"; Gili Lopes – "Antalya"; Kobi Arad, Victor Wooten, Cindy Blackman Santana, Ricky Kej & Lonnie Park – "Fields"; Lisa Marie Simmons & Marco Cremaschini – "Transcend"; Sonny Greenwich Jr – "I Get By"; Vahagn Stepanyan – "Gravity" (featuring Greg Howe & Philip Lassiter); ŽŽ Wei-Chi – "Far Away"
Jazz (Smooth/Cool)	Latin Pop/Rock
ThreeStyle – "No Matter What" (featuring Magdalena Chovancova & Robert Fertl); Evan Carydakis – "Cherry Pops"; Lyia Meta – "Always You"; Peter Calandra & Straight Up – "Mixed Emotions"; Suzanne Grzanna – "Kiss XO"; Todd Mosby – "Moonrise Samba"	Bella Rabbit – "Frio"; Alan Jones – "Shadow in the Night"(featuring Dina Rizvic); Alexander James Rodriguez – "Verano Para Siempre"; Eddie – "Nuestro Juego" (featuring Isabel Remartinez); Maria Moss – "It's You"; Rubi Mar – "Ojitos De Cafe"
Latin Tropical	Latin Urban/Hip Hop/Rap
Eduardo Padua – "Me Rompe El Coco"; Debé Gunn – "World of Soul"; JildyT – "Comprendo"; Leonardo Garcia & Max Rosado – "Overjoyed"; Natalis – "Tonto"	Pacho Buscadoro – "Caliente Caliente" (featuring Bertiel and Will Driena); Auggie Velarde – "Mirandote"; MVR!3L TNW – "La Picky"; Snow Tha Product & Santa Fe Klan – "3X4"
Lyrics/Lyricist	Message Song/Social Impact
Sophie Pecora – "In A Perfect World"; Jesica Yap – "My Life Is Fine Without You"; Krissy – "Eat This Cake"; Tim Tye/Midnight Sky – "Every Now and Then"; Savannah Brister; Sitch	Bo Bice – "Born Of Heroes' Blood"; E J Ouellette & Odessa Settles – "Let Peace Flow"; K-Syran & Ksanti – "Whenever Wherever"; Kathryn the Grape – "Love, Kindness, and Peace"; Luke Truan & Brianna Shelko – "Unstoppable (featuring Brianna)"; Sam Daniels – "Someday"
New Age/Ambient	Original Recording
Roger Subirana – "The Train of Life"; Chet Nichols – "Caravan To Orion"; David Sálezmar – "Retrospect"; Myroslav Levytsky – "Mother Waiting"; Samir Bodhi – "Affinity"	Tanja – "Don't Look Back" (produced by Max Landry); Delmoore – "Lose Myself In You" ( written & co-produced by Mary Haller); ManyLights – "Rampa" produced by Anthony Cameron; Nadia Lanfranconi – "I'd Rather Be Alone" produced by Clay Davies; Oscar Navarro – "Abrazos Para El Cielo" (featuring Adriana Tonda, produced by Oscar Navarro) produced by Oscar Navarro); THE FUND X ROBIN – "It's a Good Life" (produced by THE FUND)
Original Song	Pop
Baker Grace – "Butterflies" (by Bobbi Allen, Robert Kitzman and Baker Grace); Courtney Paige Nelson – "To Me"; Eunkyo and Michael Choi – "Across the Ocean"; Presley Aronson – "Best Road"; Ruben K & Lara Ausensi – "Water Marauders"; Saad Lamjarred & Yosra Mahnoush – "Andi Fekra" (by Dr. Talal)	Meg Smith – "Jesus Christ In a Mini Skirt"; Courtney Paige Nelson – "Cyanide Jawbreaker"; December Rose – "Macaroni"; Delon Om – "Everything"; No Lonely Hearts – "Better Than Me"; Sophia Angelica – "Parte de Mí"; superlight – "Asking Too Much"; Tanja – "The Monsters You Know"
R&B/Soul	Rap/Hip Hop
KOS – "Thank God"; Kenny J Wilkins – "You're A Woman"; KIA – "I Won't Complain"; Orayvia – "Better Days"; Tiffany Sayers – "Turn On"; TWAIN – "Nu & U" (featuring Jay Jeminii); Weava – "What Time Your Love Is Comin'"	DJ Preach & Jerry Cartier – "Solid"; Dorian Robinson – "CHAKRAS"; DV Alias Khryst – "No Discounts"; Nige B – "Outer Space" (featuring Awon & Artifice, The Visionary); Russ – "Workin on Me" (featuring 6LACK)
Rock	Rock/Pop
Billy Morrison – "Crack Cocaine" (featuring Ozzy Osbourne and Steve Stevens); HVNTED – "Katelyn Dilaine"; Ships Have Sailed – "Get Loud" (Feat. Abby Posner); Signal For Pilot – "Feelin' Again"; Vilivant – "Is This The End"	Jessy Fury – "The Other Boys"; Cindë – "Medusa's Son"; Cris Gunther, Carl Stoodt, Luã Linhares – "Beatific"; Fields, Waldo & Mathisen – "This Is How It Ends"; Ghostfallen – "Home"; Signal For Pilot – "Champions"
Singer-Songwriter	Vocal (Female)
Drew Holcomb & The Neighbors – "Find Your People"; Alex Krawczyk – "Space Between Us"; Charles V. Rox Vaccaro – "Torn to Pieces"; Heerraa – "Note to Self"; J Edna Mae – "Elephant"; Nadia Lanfranconi – "I'd Rather Be Alone"; Sarah Rose – "Love I Never Wanted"; Utako Toyama – "I See You"	memyself&vi x Chapters – "Caution"; Adriana Tonda – "Abrazos Para El Cielo"; Bella Rabbit – "Frio"; Ella Roberts – "Wild Mountain Thyme"; Keri Edwards – "I See You"; Tiffany Sayers – "In the Deep"
Vocal (Male)	World
Nam Jonez – "Everything I Wanted"; Aaron Lazar & Josh Groban – "Let Your Soul Be Your Pilot"; Bo Bice – "Born Of Heroes' Blood"; James Kocian – "One Fifth at a Time"; Jeff Hyman – "Goodbye"; Will Goodwin – "Bottom of the Holler"	Fahad Al Kubaisi – "Maslahtak"; Eddie – "A Luz Dentro de Mim"; Moumita Khondaker – "NGL"; Neval – "Yara"; Saad Lamjarred & Yosra Mahnoush – "Andi Fekra"; Samir Bodhi, Justine Blazer, Madhumita Chatterjee, (featuring Rakesh Chaurasia) – "Un-me Too"; Susan Odella and Keith Secola – "Restless Spirits" (Feat. Vanja Grastic); Winifred Phillips – "Spring Festival"

=== Studio recording professionals ===
Producer/Production	Mixing/Engineering
Dawn Elder; Donatella Canepa; Kitt Wakeley & Jonathan Estabrooks; Pearl Snap Studios; SEAY & Jeff Silverman; The Siren; S. J. Jananiy	Dean Landon; Babilonia; Jacquie Joy; Jennifer Thomas; Kayja Rose; The Goodwin Brothers
Independent record label
Blue Élan Records; Big Vox Records; DNT Entertainment; Dreamland Entertainment Group; Fine Entertainment; LMS Records; MTS Records

=== Special recognition ===
Reggae	Children's music
ManyLights	Ruth and Emilia
Concept Song
Tenacious D

== 2023 Winners and nominees ==
=== Categories ===
Adult Contemporary	Adult Contemporary Hip Hop
Savannah Brister; December Rose; Hooked Like Helen; I Want Poetry; J Edna Mae; Rislane and The Lovers (featuring Tom Hauser & Dreamshelter)	Roc Marciano & The Alchemist; Che Noir; Ivy Sole; JID (featuring Kenny Mason); Planet Asia
Afrobeats/Afropop	Americana/Roots
Baba Kuboye; Efua; Mt Boi; Stone Age UG	Kolby Knickerbocker; Terry Blade; Tia McGraff; Derek Woods Band; Ian Abel Band; Galit
Contemporary Classical	Instrumental
Ayşedeniz Gökçin; Kitt Wakeley; Danaë Xanthe Vlasse; Fabian Kratzer; Charles-Henri Avelange; Robin Spielberg; Daniel Fisher; André Barros (featuring Tamila Kharambura	Ed Bazel; Guy Renardeau; Cecil Abhishek; Joseph Lu; Seay and Jeff Silverman; Vig Zartman; Ruben K (featuring Alexa Ray); Russ Hewitt (featuring Bucharest All-Star Orchestra)
Jazz (Jazz fusion/Bebop)	Jazz (Smooth/Cool)
Vahagn Stepanyan; Kobi Arad; Brian Eisenberg Jazz Orchestra; Peter Xifaras; Paul W. Rucker; OVISION	Alan Jones featuring Dina Rizvic; Edison Herbert; Lindsey Webster; Noshir Mody; Peter Calandra and Straight Up; Suzanne Grzanna; Steven B.; ThreeStyle (featuring Magdalena Chovancova, Robert Fertl, Elvis Stanic)
Pop	Rock/Pop
Burdlee; Arkane Skye; Chesney Claire; DMGD; GEM Rpm; Jordan Massey; Tiffany Sayers	Animal Sun; Britney DiTocco; Circle the Earth; Dallas; Live in Color; Nina Rose; Talking Planes
R&B/Soul	Dance
Raquel Rodriguez; Antoine Dunn; Jordyn Simone; Kristina Murrell; Enoka; Ria Barkr; GIGI; Saint Jaimz	Kylin Milan; Dimitris Nezis & Stacey Jackson; Hannyta; Holly Berry (ft. Courtney Gray; Everlee; Sheng Belmonte
Vocal (Female)	Vocal (Male)
Shylah Ray Sunshine; Ella Roberts; Jackie Ward; Maryalex González; Rislane and The Lovers; Shaun Murphy	Gregory Zamir; Chase Bush; Lost Years, Talking Planes; Matt B; Nam Jonez; Steve Cooke
Christian/Gospel	New Age/Ambient
Kathryn Shipley; Christian Messenger; Girlie Vasallo (ft. Che Casibang, Lalaine Enriquez, Ria Villena-Osorio & Mike Villegas); Melissa Pettignano; Sarah Wyatt; Steve Bridgmon'	David Deutsch; Juliet Lyons; Cali Wang; Craig Padilla and Marvin Allen; Darlene Koldenhoven; Dream Tonic x DTO; Ros Gilman
Country (Classic)	Country (Crossover)
Colt Graves; Cam Thompson; Cindy Smith; Clayton Q; Feed the Kitty; Richard Lynch	Presley Aronson; Brooke + Teddy; Damien Horne; Hadley; Swapna Abraham (ft. Devan Ekambaram); Taylor Sanders
Folk/Acoustic	Singer-Songwriter
Carly King; Dina Rizvic; Heerraa; memyself&vi x Chapters; Moselle; Wild Faith	Emily Drennan; Grace Schweizer; Matthew Thomas; Nate Highfield; Sierra Miles; Spenser Hyun, Robin Sandoval
Blues	Bluegrass
Jeroen van Tuijl Band (ft. Tommy Stillwell); "Big John" Zhang Ling; Lady J Huston; Stevie Hawkins; Tommy Stillwell; Zach Waters Band	Kentucky Shine; Soulgrass/Debra Lyn; Nu-Blu; Randy Lanham & Emily Jane Clark; Larry Maglinger
Original Song	Lyrics/Lyricist
Reece in the Wild; April Henry; Baby Gold; Barefoot Chandy; Daryl Salad; Helena Holleran Band; Kayla Renee (ft. Jovan Armand); Sierra Bowman	Caitlin Kilgore; Fish Teeth; Jake Huffman; Nadeem Majdalany; Savannah Brister; Sitch
World	EDM
Carlos Garo; Masa Takumi; Khaled & Riffat Sultana; Mohammadreza Ajdari; Natalie Jean and Guy R. Jean; Shumile Exotic Dimensions]]	Ghostfallen; James F. Masters; Nikkole and Liam Keegan; Philippe Funk (ft. Liz Kretschmer); Rogelami; shurpi
Rock	Rock/Heavy Metal
Vilivant; Happy To Be Here; JJ McGuigan; Manny Cabo; Soul of Ears; Xtine and The Reckless Hearts	Blood of Angels; Dan Acosta & Axis Unknown; Kick The Wicked; Major Moment; Plastic Rhino; TemperMental
Rap/Hip Hop	Live or Streamed Performance
JR Jones; Ashton Martin x 1DRU; It's A Cool Day; Justy; TWAIN; Ushuaia & The Wanderlust Orchestra	The Goodwin Brothers; Abbie Thomas; Lyia Meta; Vargen
Alternative	Album
Mary Ann; Bam Bam's Boogie; Ganyos; JVMIE & Lionel Cohen; Signal for Pilot; Under The Rug	Rislane and The Lovers; Roman Miroshnichenko; Major Moment; Ignacio Salvatierra P.; December Rose; Abbie Thomas
Latin Pop/Rock	Latin Traditional
BenAnthony LaVoz; Alexa Lace; Laura Kalop; Nia Padilla; Omar Sicilia; Pia Vasquez	Xocoyotzin Herrera; Francisco Javier Gonzalez & Jose Zuniga; Herman Rodriguez; María Eugenia León; Pacho Buscadoro
Latin Tropical	Latin Urban/Hip Hop/Rap
Eduardo Padua & Dominique Patrick Noel; Dominique Patrick Noel (ft. D' William); Gato Blanco; Jesús Alejandro Pérez; Leonardo Garcia; Tatiana Liary	Pacho Buscadoro; Jaycool Charisma; JStar; Lulo El Poderoso
Children's music	Holiday
Paper Rainbows; David Schweizer; Taylor Wise, Nadeem Majdalany, Jeremy Johnson; Purple Fox and the Heebie Jeebies; Dana; Kendra K	Dream Tonic x Lucien Francis; Alexa Lace; Chet Nichols; Girlie Vasallo (ft. Faith Ignacio); Grant Maloy Smith; Ralph Johnson ft. Siedah Garrett
Message Song/Social Impact	Original Recording
Brianna; Ezre; Graham Czach; Holly Riva; Katie Hardyman & Mick Evans; Nathan Morris; Sona Kmet	Neena Rose; Ava Dell Pietra; Barli; Holysaint; Marrisa Porter; softpower; Zachary Aldana

=== Studio recording professionals ===
Producer/Production	Mixing/Engineering
Ralph Johnson and Myron McKinley; Kristin Allen-Farmer; Asta; Dawn Elder; Jay Abe; KiddDieselAP; S. J. Jananiy	Kevin Billingslea; Jeff Silverman; Robert Fertlates, Cherice Hunt, Janice James, and Princess A. Hairston; Roman Miroshnichenko; Jacquie Joy; Zen Chien
Independent record label	
Spotted Peccary Music; BHP Music Guitar Trax Records; Cliff End Records; Creative Apostle; DNT Entertainment; Kitten Robot Records; MTS Records; Music for Love; Winding Way Records	

=== Special recognition ===
Reggae	Downbeat/Downtempo
Mc Norman	Guthorn
