= Justine Blazer =

American singer-songwriter, record producer

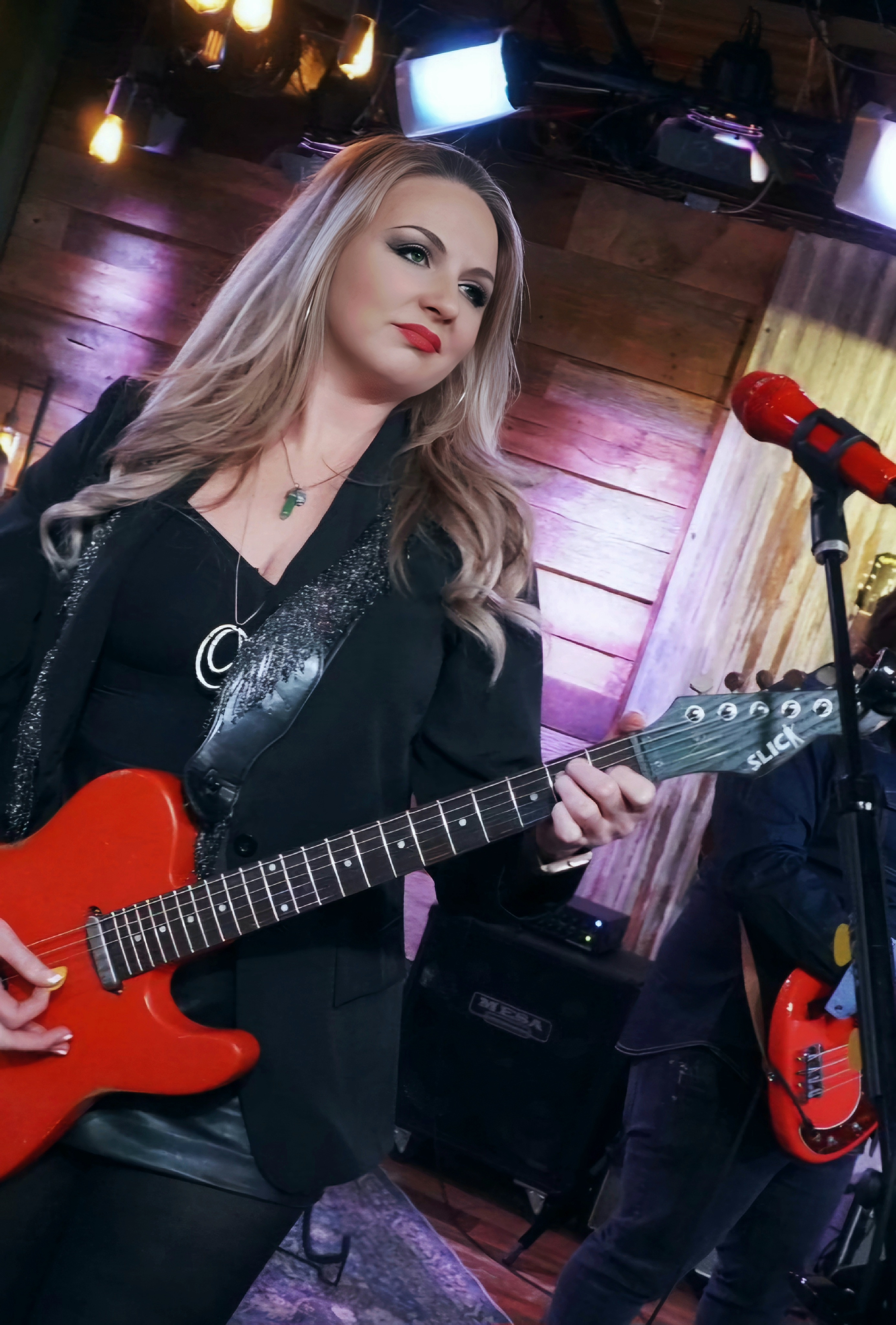
- Blazer in 2024
- Occupations: Singer; songwriter; musician; producer
- Years active: 2004–present
- Awards: Josie Music Award
- Musical career
- Genres: blues; rock; pop; country
- Instruments: Vocals; piano; guitar; harmonica
- Website: justineblazer.com

Justine Gabriella Blazer is a singer, songwriter, recording artist, and record producer. Her music has been featured on CMT and she has opened shows for such artists as Jason Aldean, Justin Moore, Lee Brice, Kathy Mattea, and Lonestar. In 2022, her album Girl Singing the Blues peaked at #18 on Billboard's Top 100 Blues Albums and won a Josie Music Award for Blues Album of the Year in 2023.

== Early life ==
Justine Blazer was born in Detroit, Michigan to parents Tom and Cindy Blazer. She took dance, voice, acting, and piano lessons as a child. Her first paid performance was at a shopping mall at the age of six or seven, where she sang "Wind Beneath my Wings" for $50. As a teenager she studied song writing, producing, and recording. She graduated from Canton High School and attended Eastern Michigan University. She lived in New York City for five years, where she modelled and learned to play the guitar and harmonica.

== Career ==
Blazer began her professional career in 2004 with her first album, Just a Justine Christmas. Her music has been featured on CMT and she has shared the stage with such artists as Jason Aldean, Justin Moore, Lee Brice, Kathy Mattea, and Lonestar.

Blazer has performed as a solo artist on NBC's Today in Nashville and her songs have been featured in the 2022 movie Hashtag Blessed and The Young and the Restless. She cites her musical influences as Alanis Morissette, Faith Hill, Celine Dion, Shania Twain, and Garth Brooks. In 2011, she won first place in Dodge Ram Trucks's Battle of the Bands contest, the goal of which was to find a new country star in Texas. She has released nine studio albums and has written and recorded with Kitt Wakeley, Kim Cameron, and Syreeta Thompson, among others. Blazer was a speaker and panellist at Music Expo in 2020.

In 2023, she won a Josie Music Award for Blues Album of the Year for Girl Singing the Blues, as well as winning a Global Music Award and Intercontinental Music Award, among others. In 2024, she was a featured performer at NAMM. In 2025, Blazer won a Songwriter Achievement Award for "Here's to the Man in Red" at the Josie Music Awards.

== Awards ==
| Year | Nominated work | Category | Award | Result |
|---|---|---|---|---|
| 2026 | " Ain’t That What Love Does" | Songwriter Achievement | Josie Music Award | Won |
| 2026 | "Love Wins" (shared with Heerraa) | Best in North America (Folk) | LA Music Award | Won |
| 2026 | "Good Love" Tom Bender (featuring Justine Blazer) | Song of the Year - Country (Duo/Collaboration) | Josie Music Award | Nominated |
| 2024 | "Girl Singing the Blues" | Best Blues Album | European International Music Award | Won |
| 2025 | "Waltzing Through a Wonderland" | Best Christmas Jazz | Holiday Music & Film Award | Nominated |
| 2025 | "Here's to the Man in Red" | Songwriter Achievement | Josie Music Award | Won |
| 2024 | "Try to Hide It" | Best of America - Country | Intercontinental Music Award | Won |
| 2024 | "Ain't No Cure Like The Blues" | Best Blues Song | Indie Music Channel Awards | Won |
| 2024 | "Make Christmas Last Forever" | Song of the Year (Holiday) | Josie Music Award | Won |
| 2024 | "Joy!" | Holiday Project of the Year | Josie Music Award | Won |
| 2024 | "Ain't No Cure For the Blues" | Blues | Hollywood Independent Music Award | Nominated |
| 2024 | "Ain't No Cure For the Blues" | Blues | Global Music Award | Won |
| 2024 | Jazz/blues/soul | Artist of the Year | Josie Music Award | Nominated |
| 2024 | Pitching Portfolio | Songwriter of the Year JMA Alum | Josie Music Award | Nominated |
| 2024 | Jazz/blues | Vocalist of the Year | Josie Music Award | Nominated |
| 2024 | JMA Alum | Music Production/producer | Josie Music Award | Nominated |
| 2024 | "Wrap Me Up" | Holiday Song of the Year | Josie Music Award | Nominated |
| 2024 | Jazz | Song of the Year | Josie Music Award | Nominated |
| 2024 | Mutli-genre | Song of the Year | Josie Music Award | Nominated |
| 2024 | Pop/contemporary/dance | Song of the Year | Josie Music Award | Nominated |
| 2023 | "Happy Little Holiday" | Best Christmas Southern Soul Song | Holiday Music & Film Award | Won |
| 2023 | "It's Rainin Christmas" | Best Christmas Country Pop Song (Female Artist) | Holiday Music & Film Award | Won |
| 2023 | Girl Singing the Blues | Blues Album of the Year | Josie Music Award | Won |
| 2023 | "Blues" | Best of America | Intercontinental Music Award | Won |
| 2023 | "Who Let The Jolly In" | Holiday Song of the Year | Josie Music Award | Won |
| 2022 | "Tears of Blue" | Best Female Vocalist (blues) | Global Music Award | Won |
| 2021 | "2020 of You" | Best Rock Song by an Artist | Josie Music Award | Won |
| 2021 | Best Female Blues Artist | | Detroit Music Awards | Nominated |

== Solo discography ==
- 2024 - Jubilee EP
- 2023 - JOY!
- 2022 - Girl Singing the Blues
- 2021 - JOLLY!
- 2019 - Pioneer Soul Shaker
- 2013 - Gasoline
- 2010 - Welcome to my World
- 2008 - Red, White, and Blue
- 2007 - Passion in Me
- 2004 - Just a Justine Christmas
