= Suzanne Grzanna =

American singer and saxophonist

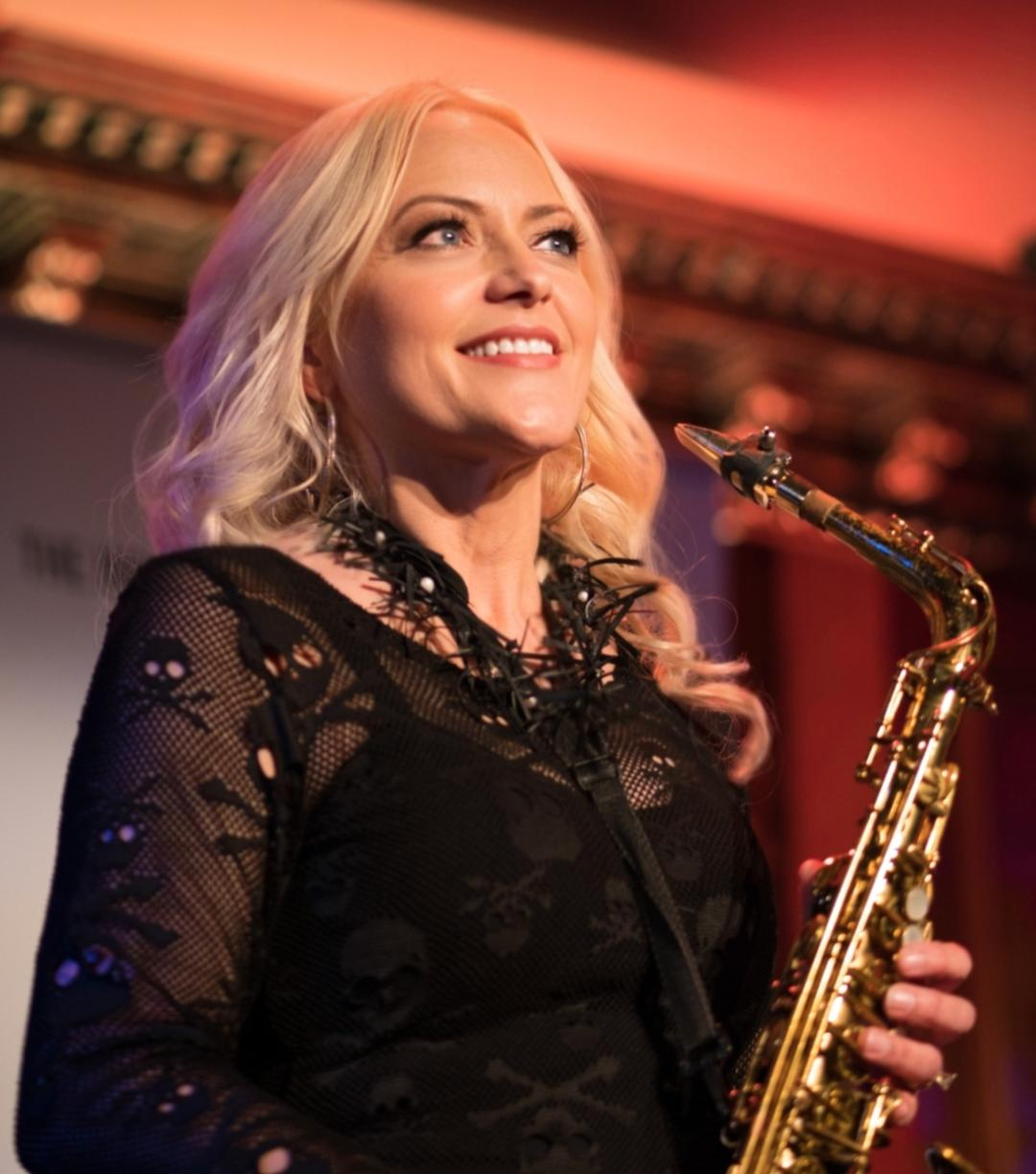
- Grzanna in 2019
- Born: Milwaukee, Wisconsin, U.S.
- Occupations: Singer; composer; musician
- Years active: 1994–present
- Musical career
- Genres: Jazz; smooth jazz
- Instruments: Vocals; alto sax
- Label: Diva Records
- Website: saxdiva.com

Suzanne Grzanna is an American songwriter, saxophonist, vocalist, arranger, and producer. She won a Hollywood Music in Media Award for "Best Jazz Song," a Global Music Award for "Best Instrumental," and has been nominated for several other awards including a Hollywood Independent Music Award. She has shared the stage with such artists as Frank Morgan, Brian Lynch, Betty Carter, and Ray Brown Jr., and has performed at Birdland, Blue Note, the Hollywood Bowl, and Jay Leno's "Grand Slam Charity Event".

== Early life and education ==
Suzanne Grzanna was born in Milwaukee, Wisconsin, to parents Don and Maureen Grzanna, who are both professional musicians. She began taking piano lessons from her mother when she was five years of age and started playing the clarinet when she was nine so she could play in her school bands. In the seventh grade she switched her main focus to alto-sax. She sang and played piano in her family band, playing jazz, rock and dance music. She played in her high school band and sang in her high school choir. While in college she performed with the jazz band, the school's symphonic orchestra, and a Christian rock group. She also sang with the Milwaukee Symphony Chorus starting at the age of 18. After attending Wisconsin Lutheran College, she graduated with a bachelor's degree from Carroll University in 1991 where she was the recipient of the "Graduate of the Last Decade," Award in 2000.

== Career ==
Grzanna is a composer, singer, multi-instrumentalist (saxophone, piano, clarinet, accordion), arranger, and producer. She has released six studio albums, The Cat's Meow (1994), Fly Me to the Moon (1999), My Santa Baby (2004), Simply Sunday (2005), Christmas Night (2008), Daybreak (2016), and The Cat's Meow Anniversary Album (2023). Grzanna composed and performed music in films, Harold Buttleman, Daredevil Stuntman, Dare to Dream: The Alan Kulwicki Story, Harold Buttleman, Daredevil Stuntman, Wild Honey, and others.

In 1994, Grzanna released her first album, "The Cat's Meow," which received favorable reviews and she performed during this period as the Suzanne Grzanna Quartet. In 1997, she won a WAMI (Wisconsin Area Music Industry Award) for Best Jazz Group/Artist Contemporary. In 1999, her single, "Fly Me to the Moon," received a fair amount of airplay on jazz radio stations and Billboard magazine wrote, Grzanna displays both melodic saxophone playing and a knack for making standards" Also that year, Billboard's Jazz /Blue Notes wrote, "Claire Daly and Suzanne Grzanna debunk myths about female jazz musicians."

In 2016, Grzanna released, "Daybreak," which received favorable reviews. In 2023, she released "The Cat's Meow Anniversary Album," which also received positive reviews.

== Selected filmography ==
- 2023 – Miami's Listening Party – composer, saxophone performance
- 2023 – Seaper Powers: Mystery of the Blue Pearls – composer, saxophone performance
- 2021 – Seaper Powers: In Search of Bleu Jay's Treasure – composer, saxophone performance
- 2019 – Wild Honey – composer, saxophone performance
- 2015 – A Christmas Horror Story – composer, vocals
- 2005 – Dare to Dream: The Alan Kulwicki Story – composer, saxophone and vocal performance
- 2003 – Harold Buttleman, Daredevil Stuntman (6 songs/soundtrack) – composer, saxophone performance
- 2001 – The Cure for Boredom – composer, vocals

== Discography ==
=== Albums ===
- 2025 - Cat's Meow X0
- 2025 - The Cat's Meow Anniversary Album Saxophone Instrumentals
- 2024 – The Cat's Meow Anniversary Album
- 2016 – Daybreak
- 2008 – Christmas Night
- 2005 – Simply Sunday
- 2004 – My Santa Baby
- 1999 – Fly Me to the Moon
- 1994 – Cat's Meow

=== Singles ===
- 2026 - Sunset Dreams
- 2018 - Spring Waltz
- 2016 – Daybreak

== Awards ==
Year	Nominated work	Category	Award	Result
2026	"Sunset Dreams"	Jazz	Global Music Award	Won
2026	"Sunset Dreams"	Best Jazz Instrumentalist	European International Music Award	Won
2026	"Sunset Dreams"	Best Jazz Artist	Indie Music Channel Award	Won
2026	"Sunset Dreams"	Best Jazz Producer	Indie Music Channel Award	Won
2026	"Cat's Meow XO"	Jazz/Best of North America	Intercontinental Music Award	Won
2024	"Kiss XO"	Jazz (Smooth/Cool)	Hollywood Independent Music Awards	Nominated
2023	"Running Past the Line"	Best Dance Video(with Kim Cameron)	Indie Music Channel Award	Won
2023		Jazz (Smooth/Cool)	Hollywood Independent Music Awards	Nominated
2021		Jazz (with John DePatie and Kim Cameron)	Hollywood Music in Media Award	Nominated
2021		Indie Music Hall of Fame Inductee	Indie Music Channel Award	Won
2020	"By the Fireside"	Jazz	Hollywood Music in Media Award	Nominated
2020		Best Jazz Female Artist	Indie Music Channel Award	Won
2020		Best Jazz Producer	Indie Music Channel Award	Won
2019	Artist of the Year	Jazz/Blues	Josie Music Award	Won
2018	Artist of the Year	Jazz/Blues	Josie Music Award	Won
2018	Spring Waltz	Jazz	Hollywood Music in Media Award	Nominated
2017	"Daybreak"	Best Instrumental/Instrumentalist	Global Music Award	Won
2016		Jazz	Hollywood Music in Media Award	Won
1997		Best Jazz Group/Artist Contemporary	WAMI Award (Wisconsin Area Music Industry Award)	Won
