= Jasmine Crowe =

American singer-songwriter

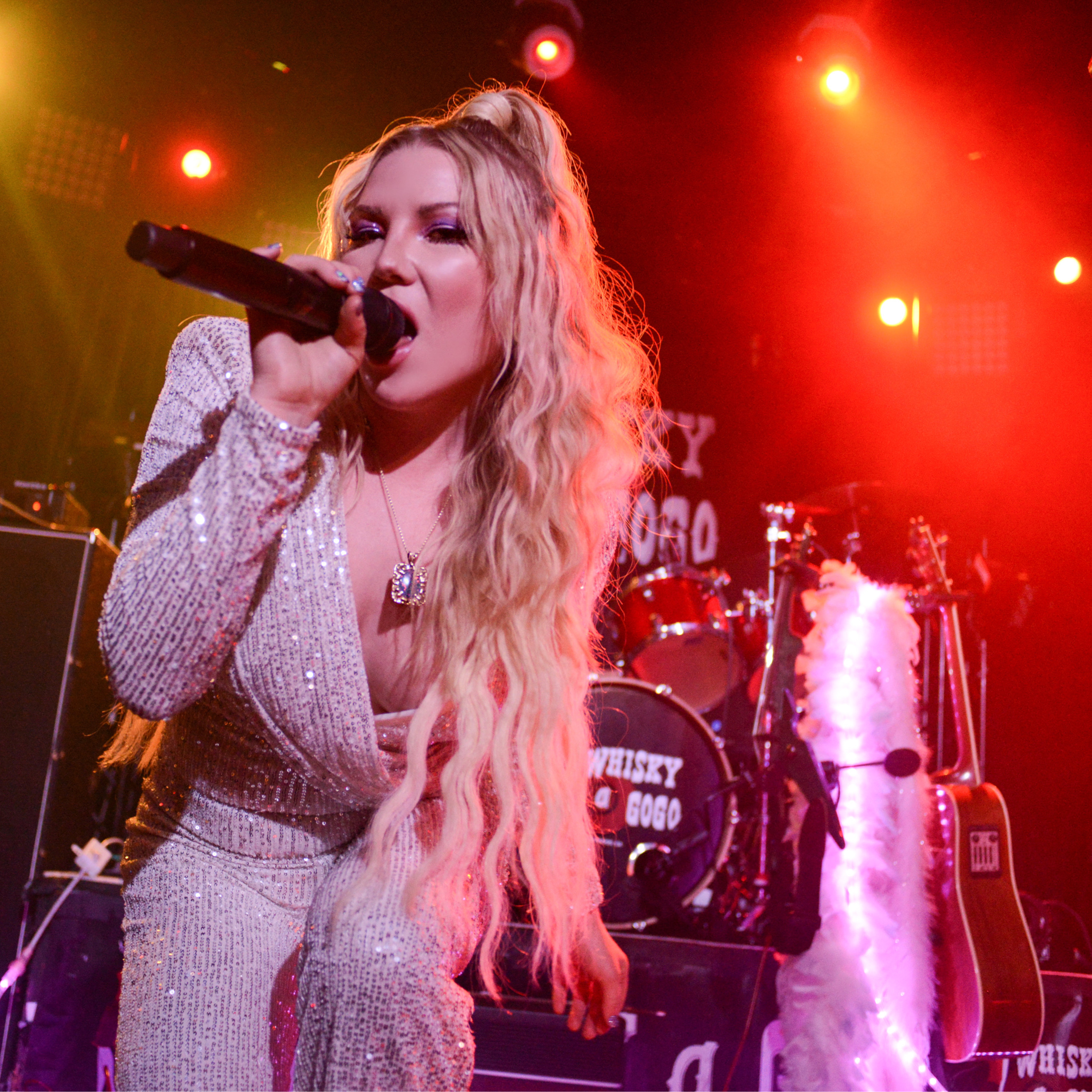
- Born: Hilo, Hawaii
- Occupations: Singer; songwriter; musician; music producer
- Years active: 2006–present
- Musical career
- Genres: Pop; dance; rock; electronic
- Instruments: Vocals; piano; guitar; violin; ukulele
- Label: Hard Pop
- Website: jasminecrowe.com

Jasmine Crowe is an American singer, songwriter, musician, and music producer. Her single Chess Game charted at #28 on the US Billboard's Dance Club chart in 2020 and her co-write, Tiger, recorded by Hana charted at #18 on Japan's Billboard chart in 2026. Her single Breaking Things won Song of the Year in the John Lennon Songwriting Contest and her music has been featured on Temptation Island, Ghosted: Love Gone Missing, and Running on Empty.

== Early life ==
Jasmine Miranda Crowe was born in Hilo, Hawaii to parents Richard and Debra Crowe. Her father was an accomplished pianist and astronomer. She began playing the violin at three years old. She attended Young Music Studio and was a violinist in the Orchid Isle Youth Orchestra. Crowe learned to sing while listening to Broadway musical recordings, and eventually started performing locally. She began writing songs and learning music production as a teenager; she is self-taught on the piano, guitar, and ukulele.

== Career ==
Crowe began playing music in Hawaii and moved to Los Angeles to pursue a professional music career. Her single "Lightning in a Bottle" won first place (Pop Category) in the UK Songwriting Competition in 2016. In 2018, she was the Grand Prize Winner of the John Lennon Songwriting Contest for her single "Breaking Things". The prize was presented to her by Ringo Starr.

Her debut album, Symptoms, released in 2019, received favorable reviews. The album's single "Chess Game" charted at #28 on Billboard's Dance Chart, and additional singles were featured on Temptation Island, Ghosted: Love Gone Missing, and Running on Empty.

Crowe cites her musical influences as Lady Gaga, Sia, Jewel, Alanis Morissette, and Taylor Swift. She has performed at venues including Whisky a Go Go, the Hotel Café, the Mint, and Jam in the Van.

In 2020, Crowe's single, Sky Is Falling (Chris Cox radio mix), was featured in Billboard magazine's "Polling club DJs" with DJ Miik writing, "One of my all-favorite remixers, Chris Cox, delivers his trademark pop-meets-club style. The song is so catchy that after a few listens, I couldn’t get it out of my head."

In 2021, Crowe was the Viewer's Choice Winner (Best Female Solo Artist) for her music video "Sky is Falling" at the California Music Video Awards. Her Pride anthem, "Love is Love", received the Social Justice Award the following year, and charted at #32 on the LGBTQ UK Music Chart in 2022.

In 2023, Crowe released the single "The Shirt Song", as well as the music video, which aired on MTV's Spankin' New in 2023. In 2024, her music video "Chameleon" won Best LGBTQ Music Video at the California Music Video Awards. Crowe was formerly in the music duo BLVCKBOW, with Brittni Paiva.

Her 2025 co-write, "Tiger" (recorded by Hana), charted at #18 on Japan's Billboard Hot 100 chart and its remix, "Tiger with Honey version" charted at #68.

== Awards ==
Year	Nominated work	Category	Award	Result
2026	Tiger (Hana)	Best Dance & Vocal Song (Group/Solo)	Music Awards Japan	Nominated
2026	Beautiful Mystery	Best Adult Contemporary	Hollywood Independent Music Award	Won
2026	Beautiful Mystery (Jasmine Crowe, Keith Weidner, Blake Buentelo)	Best Original Song	Hollywood Independent Music Award	Nominated
2026	Invisible String (Acoustic)	Best Singer-Songwriter	Hollywood Independent Music Award	Nominated
2024	Chameleon	Best Female Solo Artist/Best LGBTQ	California Music Video Award	Won
2024	The Shirt Song	Best Love Song	California Music Video Award	Nominated
2022	Love is Love	Best Female Solo Artist/Social Justice and Hope	California Music Video Award	Won
2021	Sky is Falling	Best Female Solo Artist	California Music Video Award	Won
2018	Breaking Things	Grand Prize	John Lennon Songwriting Contest	Won

== Billboard Chart History ==
Year	Single	Peak chart positions	
Year	Single	US	Japan
2020	Chess Game	28	-
2026	Tiger (Hana)	-	18
2026	Tiger with Honeys Ver. (Hana)	-	68

== Film and TV ==
- 2019 - Ghosted: Love Gone Missing - Playing with Fire
- 2022 - Temptation Island - Love Thing
- 2023 - MTV - The Shirt Song
- 2024 - Running on Empty - Beautiful Mystery

== Discography ==
Albums

- 2019 - Symptoms
- 2024 - Moonbow

Singles

- 2018 - Breaking Things
- 2019 - Chess Game
- 2020 - Sky is Falling
- 2020 - Sky Is Falling (Chris Cox radio mix)
- 2021 - Love is Love
- 2023 - The Shirt Song
- 2024 - Beautiful Mystery (Running on Empty film soundtrack)
- 2025 - Tiger
