= Ed Bazel =

American pianist and composer

- Born: Huntington, West Virginia, U.S.
- Occupations: Composer; Musician
- Years active: 1982–present
- Awards: Hollywood Independent Music Award
- Musical career
- Genres: Instrumental; Contemporary Instrumental; New-Age
- Instruments: Piano; keyboards
- Website: edbazel.com

Ed Bazel is an American pianist and composer. He won a Hollywood Independent Music Award in 2023 and was nominated for a Josie Music Award for Musician of the Year in 2025. He founded the River of Calm Headphones and led a fundraising drive that has provided patients with wireless, rechargeable headphones that stream tranquil music while undergoing chemotherapy at all seven Vanderbilt-Ingram Cancer Center locations. In 2025, he was awarded a COVR Visionary Gold Award.

== Early life and education ==
Ed Bazel was born in Huntington, West Virginia to parents Edward and Irene Bazel. He began taking piano lessons at five years old and later studied under Lou Levy, Joe Harnell, and Clare Fischer. He earned a Business Degree from Marshall University and a Computer Programming Degree from the University of Kentucky.

== Career ==
Bazel has released six studio albums; Bella Piano (2013), Homecoming (2021), The London Sessions: Reflections From Studio 2 (2022), The London Sessions: New Perspectives from Studio 2 (2024), The Christmas Sessions: Season's Greeting in Studio 2 (2024), and A Weekend in Marin (2025), which have received favorable reviews. In 2023, The London Sessions: Reflections From Studio 2 charted at #6 on the New Age chart.

Bazel began composing music in the early 1980s and in 1984 co-wrote "Cat Rap" for the Kentucky Wildcats basketball team which received a fair amount of airplay. He performed solo piano shows throughout the 1980s and 1990s at venues including the Beverly Hills Country Club and the Ritz-Carlton in Los Angeles. In 1991, he performed in Beijing, as a band member of Pegasus.

Bazel became a producer of corporate events for companies providing concert artists, comedians, and speakers in over 25 countries. In 2001, he was elected President of the Nashville Association of Talent Directors. In 2014, he was nominated for an International Entertainment Buyers Association Award for Corporate Talent Buyer of the Year.

In 2023, he won a Hollywood Independent Music Award for Soaring for Best Instrumental Song. Other awards include Global Music Awards and Intercontinental Music Awards. In 2025 he was nominated for a Hollywood Independent Music Award for "Daybreak" for Best Instrumental Song as well as being nominated for a Josie Music Award for Musician of the Year.

In 2015, Bazel founded The River of Calm - Music To Soothe Your Soul online radio network which streams music. He later launched the River of Calm Headphones and led a fundraising drive that has provided patients with wireless, rechargeable headphones that stream tranquil music while undergoing chemotherapy at all seven Vanderbilt-Ingram Cancer Center locations. He has also volunteered as a pianist for patients in the waiting room at Henry-Joyce Cancer Clinic at Vanderbilt-Ingram Cancer Center. Bazel is an artistic collaborator with the SENSE Theatre intervention research program, composing music for the program which focuses on enhancing social competence in children and adolescents with autism spectrum disorder. In 2025, he was awarded a COVR Visionary Gold Award.

== Discography ==
- 2025 - A Weekend in Marin
- 2024 - The Christmas Sessions: Season's Greeting in Studio 2
- 2024 - The London Sessions: New Perspectives from Studio 2
- 2022 - The London Sessions: Reflections From Studio 2
- 2021 - Homecoming
- 2013 - Bella Piano

== Awards ==
Year	Nominated work	Category	Award	Result
2025	Daybreak	Best Instrumental Song	Hollywood Independent Music Award	Nominated
2025		Musician of the Year (Piano/Keys)	Josie Music Award	Nominated
2025	The River of Calm, Headphones For Chemotherapy	Gold Award for Visionary Product	COVR Visionary Awards	Won
2025	A Beautiful Life	Best Instrumental	Global Music Award	Won
2025	Beautiful Tonight	Best New Age	Global Music Award	Won
2024	Beautiful Life	Best of America - Contemporary Instrumental	Intercontinental Music Award	Won
2023	Soaring	Best of America - Contemporary Instrumental	Intercontinental Music Award	Won
2023	Soaring	Best Instrumental Song	Hollywood Independent Music Award	Won
2014		Corporate Talent Buyer of the Year	International Entertainment Buyers Association Award	Nominated
