= Piper Connolly =

- Born: July 7, 2011 (age 15); Phoenix, Arizona, U.S.
- Genres: Alternative rock, Pop
- Occupations: Singer, songwriter
- Years active: 2023–present
- Member of: The Habit
- Website: www.hernameispiperconnolly.com

Piper Phoenix Connolly (born July 7, 2011) is an independent American singer and songwriter. She is best known for her Alternative pop song “beautiful life,” which received a Hollywood Independent Music Awards nomination for Best Alternative Song.

== Early life ==
Piper Phoenix Connolly was born in Phoenix, Arizona to Chris Connolly and Natalie Rostad. Her mother is a former actress. Piper is the great-niece of Canadians Country music artist, Wayne Rostad, through her mother. Connolly began performing music as a child and studied at The School of Rock. She plays the piano, guitar, and drums. In 2026, Piper relocated from Phoenix to Los Angeles.

== Career ==
Connolly began releasing music in 2024, including her acclaimed single “muse.” The song was later nominated for Best Pop Song at the 2024 Glacer FM Listener’s Choice Awards.

In 2025, she began performing with The Habit as its lead vocalist and frontwoman.

In 2026, Connolly released the song “beautiful life,” which debuted at No. 40 on 5FM’s Top 40 on 5 in South Africa and remained on the chart for multiple consecutive weeks. The Hollywood Independent Music Awards nominated “beautiful life” in the Best Alternative Song category. That same year, Piper relocated from Phoenix to Los Angeles and continued recording music and performing at venues like The Viper Room. In September 2026, she released her debut EP, she’s too much!.

== Discography ==
=== EPs ===
Title	EP details
Glitchgirl.Exe (Remix)	Released: 2025; Label: Independent; Formats: Digital
she's too much!	Released: 2026; Label: Independent; Formats: Digital
