= Abbie Thomas =

American singer-songwriter

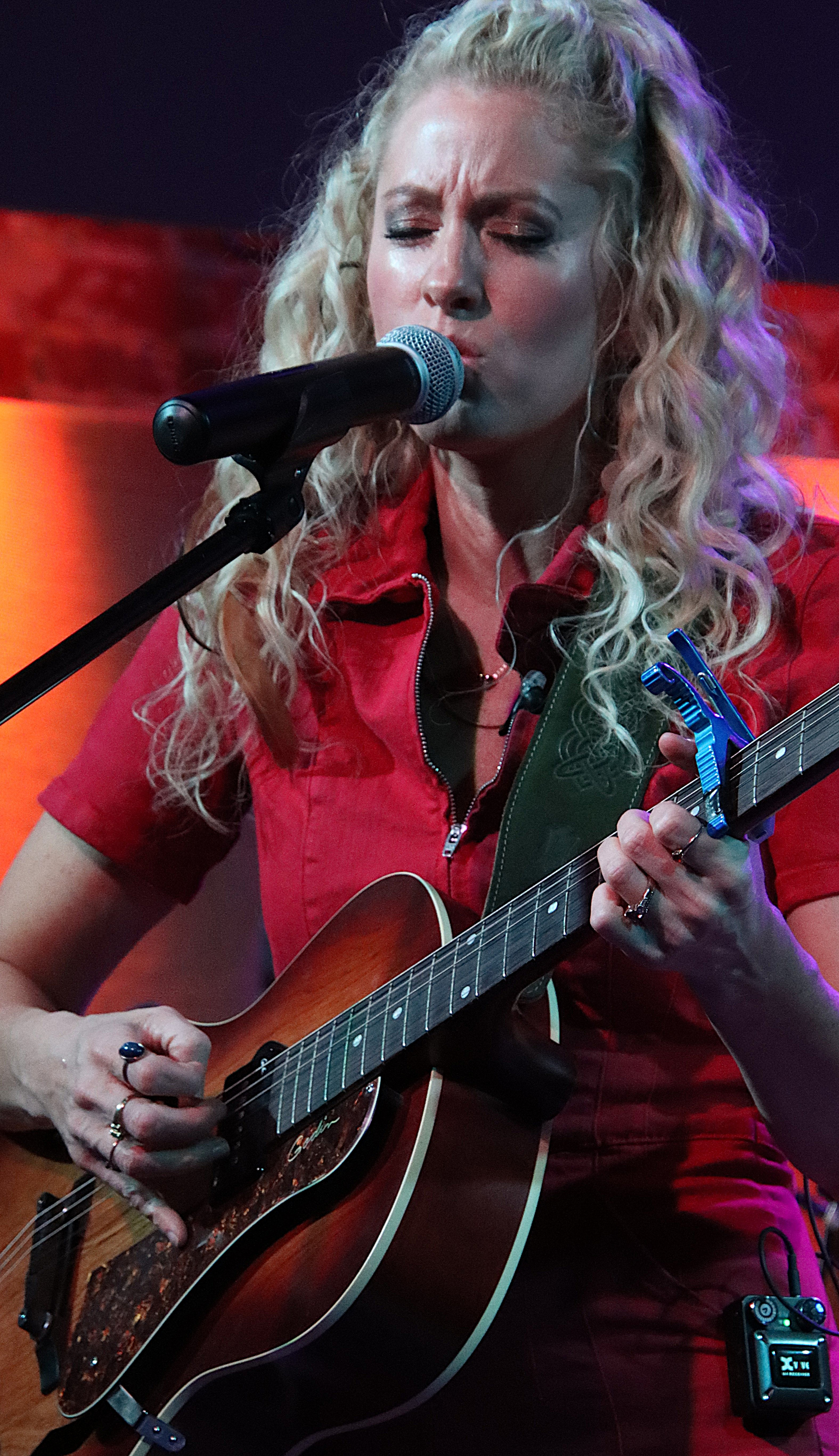
- Born: California, US
- Occupations: Singer; songwriter; musician; film composer
- Years active: 2018–present
- Awards: HIMA Award
- Musical career
- Genres: singer-songwriter; indie folk; soul; pop; R&B; jazz
- Instruments: Guitar; piano; vocals; trumpet
- Website: abbiethomasmusic.com

Abbie Thomas is a singer, songwriter, musician, and film composer. She was nominated for a Hollywood Music in Media Award for Best Live Concert For Visual Media for Live From Ignition Garage and won a Hollywood Independent Music Award for Best Acoustic/Folk Song for Mid July. She has opened shows for artists such as Clint Black, Colbie Caillat, Laine Hardy, Girl Named Tom, and Cathy Richardson. She has released three studio albums, Who I Am (2021), Dirty Little Things (EP) (2022), and Not Gonna Lie (2024).

== Early life and career ==
Abbie Thomas was born in California to parents Tony and Christie Thomas. She began playing guitar and piano as a child and sang in her father's churches with her mother, who once was a trio member with Crystal Gayle. She cites musical influences as the Beatles, Karen Carpenter, and James Morrison. Thomas graduated from Crawfordsville High School.

== Career ==
Thomas is a singer, songwriter, musician (guitar, piano), and film composer. In addition to writing songs Thomas has composed music for the Elkhart Symphony Orchestra, South Bend Symphony String Quartet, and the short film, Tight Squeeze. She also performs as Abbie Thomas and the Crazy Hearts.

In 2021, Thomas released her debut album, Who I am which was nominated for Album of the Year at the Hollywood Independent Music Awards and its single release, Fireflies earned a nomination for Best Independent Music Video. In 2022, she released Dirty Little Things (EP) with its single Dirty Little Things being nominated for a Josie Music Award for Best Song as well as winning Female Artist of the Year in 2023 and 2024. She also performs as Abbie Thomas and the Crazy Hearts.

In 2024, she released Not Gonna Lie which received favorable reviews and its single Mid July won a Hollywood Independent Music Award for Best Acoustic/Folk Song. In that same year, Thomas performed at the "Ignition Music Garage," a showcase featuring a live recording, which earned her a Hollywood Music in Media Award nomination for Best Live Concert For Visual Media in 2024.

=== Discography ===
- 2024 - Not Gonna Lie
- 2022 - Dirty Little Things (EP)
- 2021 - Who I Am

== Awards ==
Year	Nominated work	Category	Award	Result
2026	Live From the Temple	Live Concert For Visual Media	Hollywood Music in Media Award	Nominated
2025	Not Gonna Lie, Live From Ruthmere Museum	Live Concert For Visual Media	Hollywood Music in Media Award	Nominated
2025		Vocalist of the Year (multi-genre)	Josie Music Award	Won
2025	Not Gonna Lie	Album of the Year (multi-genre)	Josie Music Award	Won
2025	Mid July	Folk/Acoustic	Hollywood Independent Music Award	Won
2025	Bitch Make the Coffee	Blues	Hollywood Independent Music Award	Nominated
2024	Not Gonna Lie	Album of the Year	Josie Music Award	Nominated
2024	Live From Ignition Garage	Best Live Concert For Visual Media	Hollywood Music in Media Award	Nominated
2024		Female Artist of the Year	Josie Music Award	Won
2023		Female Artist of the Year	Josie Music Award	Won
2022	Fireflies	Best Single Camera Production	California Music Video Award	Won
2022	Fireflies	Best Eye (Cinematography)	California Music Video Award	Nominated
2022	Fireflies	Best Female Solo Artist	California Music Video Award	Nominated
2021	Fireflies	Best Independent Music Video	Hollywood Music in Media Award	Nominated
