= Wendy Loomis =

American poet, pianist, composer

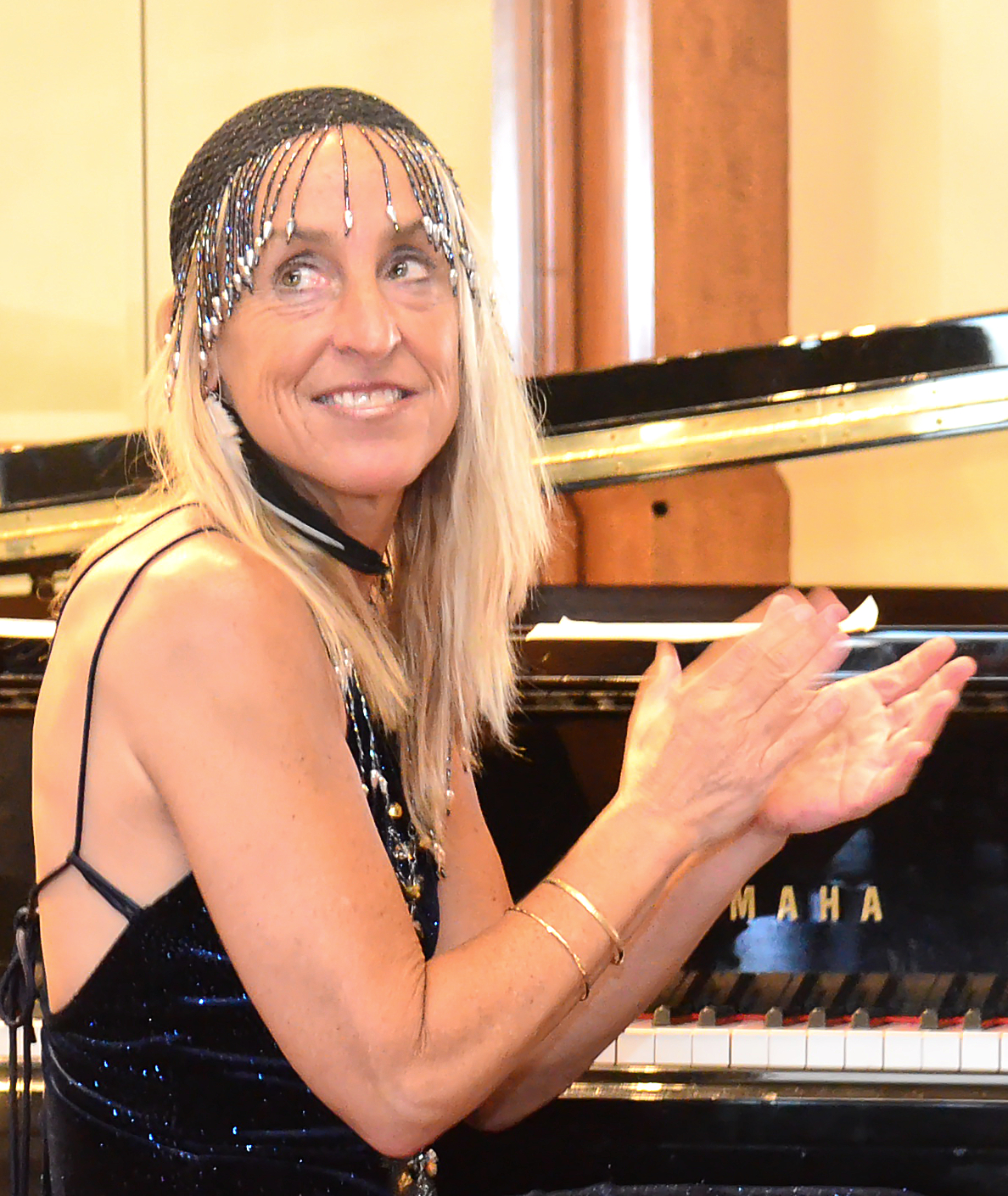
- Loomis in 2015
- Other name: COPUS
- Occupations: composer; musician; performer
- Years active: 1995–present
- Musical career
- Genres: Spoken word; jazz; new-age
- Instruments: Vocals; piano; keyboards
- Label: Copus Multimedia
- Website: wendyloomis.com

Wendy Loomis is an American composer, musician, and spoken word performer. She has been nominated for two Hollywood Music in Media Awards and won an Indie Music Channel Award, among others. She composed and performed, What if We?, a piece about sea level rise, in conjunction with scientists from TheClimateMusic Project, for the King Abdullah University of Science and Technology in Saudi Arabia as well as throughout the US. In addition to her solo music career, she is a founding member of COPUS and Inner Sky and former member of Phoenix Rising.

== Early life and education ==
Wendy Lee Loomis attended Taconic High School. She attended Denison University where she performed dance and piano recitals, sang in the school's concert choir, and graduated with a bachelor's degree in Creative Arts. She earned her master's degree in Arts Education from Syracuse University.

== Career ==
=== Solo career ===
Loomis has released three studio albums, Strange Conjunction (1995), Piano & Friends (2000), and High Tech, High Touch (2018), and the single Always (2019), which received favorable reviews. She has performed at The Bitter End, 54 Below, SFJAZZ Center, Los Angeles, and throughout the San Francisco Bay Area. She has been nominated for two Hollywood Music in Media Awards; the first in 2017 for Liberte Egalite for Best Message Song/Social Impact Song and the second in 2019 for Always for Best Christian/Gospel Song. In 2025, she was nominated for an Indie Music Channel Award for Best Pop Songwriter for Give Me Strength. Loomis composed music for film shorts, Virgin of the Candles (2009), Tragic (2019), and Léa (2017).

In 2010, Loomis wrote, Anything I Perceive: A Tribute to the Sixteen Women Senators, which was in included in Feminists Collections at the University of Wisconsin and was a featured performer at the "Ohio Connection" of female composers at Capital University.

In 2018, she became involved in TheClimateMusic Project, a San Francisco-based group of musicians and scientists working to sonically showcase the impact of carbon emissions and inspire audiences to take action on climate change. In 2019, she performed What if We?, composed by Loomis and in collaboration with Royal Kent and in conjunction with scientists from TheClimateMusic Project, at the World Bank in Washington, D.C. as well as performing for the King Abdullah University of Science and Technology in Saudi Arabia in 2022. In 2025, she performed the piece at the 23rd Annual International Ocean Film Foundation. Loomis' song, Give Me Strength was the theme song in the 2026 documentary, Dragon House.

=== Copus ===
In 1999, Loomis co-founded COPUS (acronym for Creation Of Peace Under Stars) with poet Royal Kent (Kent Edwards.) They have released six studio albums; Later Than You Think (1999), Jah Provide (2011), Aspects (2015), The Dilemma (2022), and Methuselah (2023). In 2025, Loomis released, The Assignment: A Tribute to Poet Royal Kent, to honor Kent's passing in 2024. COPUS has performed at clubs, theaters, and festivals in the San Francisco Bay Area, Los Angeles, Nashville, and Atlanta, among other US cities. They won two Indie Music Channel Awards; the first in 2024 for Best Emerging Band of the Year and the second in 2025 for Light for Best Soundtrack Video Under $5,000

== Discography ==
=== Solo ===
- 1995 - Strange Conjunction
- 2000 - Piano & Friends
- 2018 - High Tech, High Touch
- 2019 - Always (single)
- 2026 - Gaudi Curves

=== COPUS ===
- 1999 - Later Than You Think
- 2011 - Jah Provide
- 2015 - Aspects
- 2022 - The Dilemma
- 2023 - Methuselah
- 2025 - The Assignment

=== Phoenix Rising ===
- 2005 - Whispers
- 2009 - Ascension
- 2014 - Mystic Places
- 2016 - In My Dreams Again

=== Inner Sky ===
- 2024 - A Spark

== Awards ==
Year	Nominated work	Category	Award	Result
2026		Message Song/Social Impact	Hollywood Independent Music Award	Nominated
2026	Give Me Strength	Best Pop Song	Global Music Award	Won
2025	Light	Best Soundtrack Video Under $5,000	Indie Music Channel Award	Won
2025	Give Me Strength	Best Pop Songwriter	Indie Music Channel Award	Nominated
2025	Me	Best Music Video	Clouzine International Music Award	Won
2024	COPUS	Best Emerging Band of the Year	Indie Music Channel Award	Won
2019	Always	Best Christian/Gospel	Hollywood Music in Media Award	Nominated
2017	Liberte Egalite	Best Message Song/Social Impact	Hollywood Music in Media Award	Nominated
