= Cris Gunther =

American singer-songwriter and actor

Cris Gunther is an American singer-songwriter. His original song "Never Give Up" was chosen by Madonna to be a feature in her global digital arts initiative, Art-For-Freedom and won the Best Message Song / Social Impact award from the Hollywood Music in Media Awards.

== Career ==
Gunther was born in Beckley, West Virginia. Singing in a Pentecostal church choir at the age of nine, he started his performing career in nightclubs and talent competitions. Gunther's father, Terry Gunther, was a professional country/pop/gospel singer and songwriter in the 1980s and 1990s. He performed at The Memorial Service For Miners in Beckley, West Virginia, in April 2010, where President Barack Obama was the keynote speaker.

As a teenager, Gunther moved to New York City where he attended Marymount Manhattan College to study theatre and psychology. While there, he played a San Patricio Soldier in The History Channel's 2006 TV movie 'The Mexican-American War'.

Discovering his passion for music, Gunther spent the next few years writing and recording music demos. He was chosen to perform in a Songwriters Hall of Fame Showcase in New York City. In 2007, Gunther released his debut, independent album, Fall into the Open via iTunes, with the participation of producer/writer, Fab Dupont on the track, "Fools Gold"; and also in collaboration with Mic Murphy on the tracks, "Gotta Give", "Sacred Sexuality", and the Kylie Minogue cover, "Turn It into Love". The rest of the album was co-written and co-produced with producer/songwriter and film composer, Tim K.

In October 2010, Gunther performed seventeen shows for his debut tour sponsored by Cultura Inglesa.

Gunther reached No. 1 on Reverbnation's Pop Chart for Belo Horizonte, Brazil; and the Brazilian national top 5. Cris Gunther's original, unreleased composition, "They Need Love" was rated No. 1 for 3 weeks in June 2015 on ISINA.

On April 7, 2016, actor Jared Leto selected Gunther's song, "204" to be a feature on his Carrera World Eyewear Maverick campaign website.

In 2017, the inaugural talent show of ex-American Idol judge Randy Jackson, along with Babyface, Kenny G, and Walter Afanasieff selected Gunther to be one of only 15 applicants selected out of more than 30,000 from around the world to compete in the ISINA competition. He was then announced as one of the winners on April 2, 2018, and his song, "Compass Love" was announced as one of the songs to appear on a new soon-to-be-released Netflix series soundtrack and to be released for streaming by ISINA Music/Warner Bros. Records.

In 2024, Gunther's song "Beatific" received a nomination at the Hollywood Independent Music Awards in the Rock/Pop category.

== Discography ==
=== Albums ===
- Fall into the Open (2007)
- Anchor and Wings (2016)
