= Mohammed Paika =

American singer-songwriter

Mohammed K. Paika
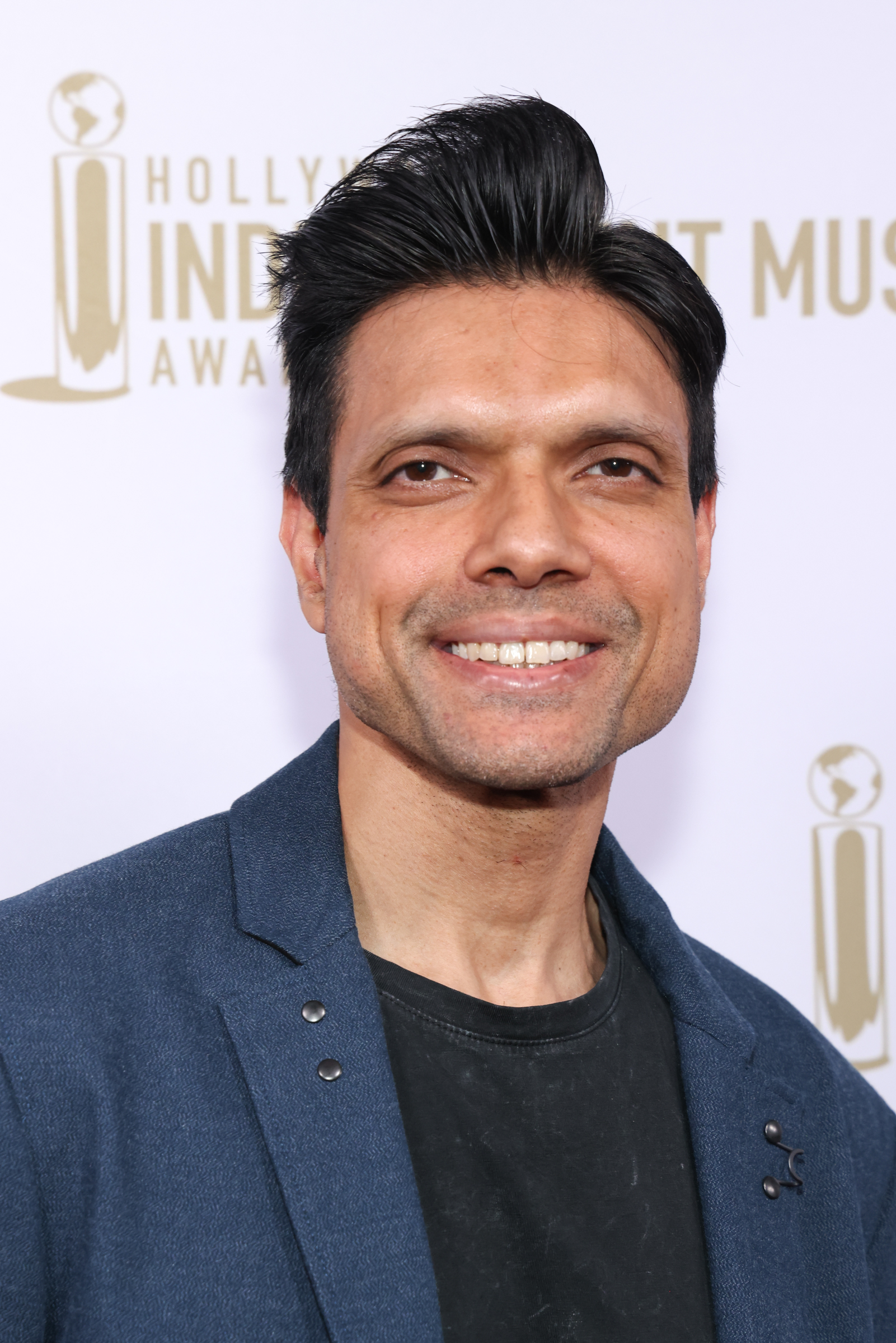
- Born: Bombay, India
- Occupations: singer; songwriter; musician
- Years active: 2000–present
- Awards: HIMA
- Musical career
- Genres: Pop; R&B; christian; world
- Instruments: Vocals; Keyboards
- Website: mohammedpaika.com

Mohammed Khisar Paika (born 27 August 1979) is a singer, songwriter, and musician. His single, Just Human, won a Hollywood Independent Music Award, had received over 11 million views on YouTube in August, 2025, and charted at #1 on the YouTube Shorts' charts.

== Early life and education ==
Mohammed Khisar Paika was born in Bombay, India. His family immigrated to the US when he was 6 years old and he began singing when he was 13 years old. In college he was a member of the band, "Silent Thunder", who released an acapella album, Sounds of Reverence in 2002. He attended Ross University School of Medicine and Albany Medical Center and is a licensed physician.

== Career ==
Paika is a singer, songwriter, and musician (keyboards), and physician (internist). He released his first solo acapella spiritual chant album in 2015. Paika's music combines eastern and western music and he cites bollywood music, Frank Sinatra, Elvis Presley, Michael Jackson, Ahmad bin Ali Al-Ajmi, Mohammed Rafi, Kishore Kumar, and Fairuz as musical influences. His songs and music videos have received awards from the Hollywood Independent Music Awards, California Music Video Awards, and the Cannes World Film Festival, among others. Paika's single Just Human has received 11 million views as of August, 2025, charted at #1 on the YouTube Shorts charts, won numerous awards, and received favorable reviews. He directs all of his music videos and is the founder and managing director of One Essence Productions. In October, 2026, the Dr. Paika Podcast charted at #62 on Apple's Health & Fitness/Medicine in Cyprus.

== Awards ==
Year	Nominated work	Category	Award	Result
2025	Just Human	Christian/Gospel	Hollywood Independent Music Award	Won
2025	Just Human	Music Video (Independent)	Hollywood Music in Media Award	Nominated
2025	Just Human	Best Music Video	Austin Micro Film Festival Award	Won
2025	Just Human	Best Music Video	Texas Short Film Festival Award	Won
2025	Just Human	Best American Music Video (USA)	Los Angeles Movie and Music Video Award	Won
2024	Just Human	Best Song	New York International Film Award	Won
2024	Stronger	Best Music Video	Global Film Festival Award	Won
2024	Just Human	Best Song	World Film Festival in Cannes	Won
2022	Purpose of Life	Word Award	California Music Video Award	Won
2022	Purpose of Life	Best Inspirational Video	California Music Video Award	Nominated
2019	So Many Divisions - Ya Rahman	Best Song	Festigious International Film Festival Award	Won
2019	So Many Divisions - Ya Rahman	Best Music Video (Islamic)	Indie Fest Film Award	Won
2019	So Many Divisions - Ya Rahman	Best Music Video	Independent Short Award	Won
2019	So Many Divisions - Ya Rahman	Best Music Video	New York Film Award	Won

== YouTube Shorts Charts ==
Year	Single	Peak chart positions			
Year	Single	UAE	CAN	UK	US
2025	Just Human	1	16	27	46

== Discography ==
- 2024 - Purpose Extended
- 2024 - M.H.3.0.
- 2023 - M.H.2.0.
- 2023 - M.H.1.0.
- 2022 - Muhabbat 1.0
- 2022 - Enlighten 1.0
- 2022 - Ishq-E-Khuda
- 2017 - Unity
- 2015 - The Most Merciful
- 2003 - Sounds of Reverence
