= Kobi Arad =

Israeli-born American musician

Kobi Arad קובי ארד
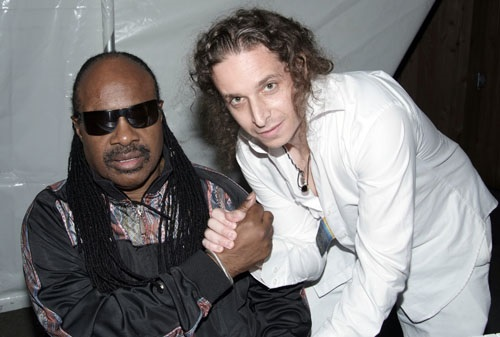
- Kobi Arad (right) with Stevie Wonder (left)

Background information
- Born: Kobi Yakob Arad; October 2, 1981 (age 44); Haifa, Israel
- Genres: Jazz
- Occupations: Musician, composer, producer
- Instruments: Piano, keyboard, synthesizer, vocals
- Member of: Kobi Arad Band

Kobi Yakob Arad (Hebrew: קובי ארד; born: October 2, 1981) is an Israeli-born American jazz pianist, composer, and music producer. He is known for being the pianist, vocalist, and bandleader of the Kobi Arad Band. He has won a Hollywood Music in Media (HMMA) Award and an Independent Music Award, both for his work as a solo artist and as part of the Kobi Arad Band. In 2025, he won a Hollywood Independent Music Award.

He has collaborated with artists such as Stevie Wonder, Cindy and Carlos Santana, Stewart Copeland, Jack DeJohnette, and Roy Ayers.

== Early life and education ==
Arad was born on October 2, 1981 and raised in Haifa, Israel. He earned his bachelor's degree at Tel Aviv University and became the first musician to earn a doctorate in contemporary improvisation and third stream from the New England Conservatory of Music.

== Career ==
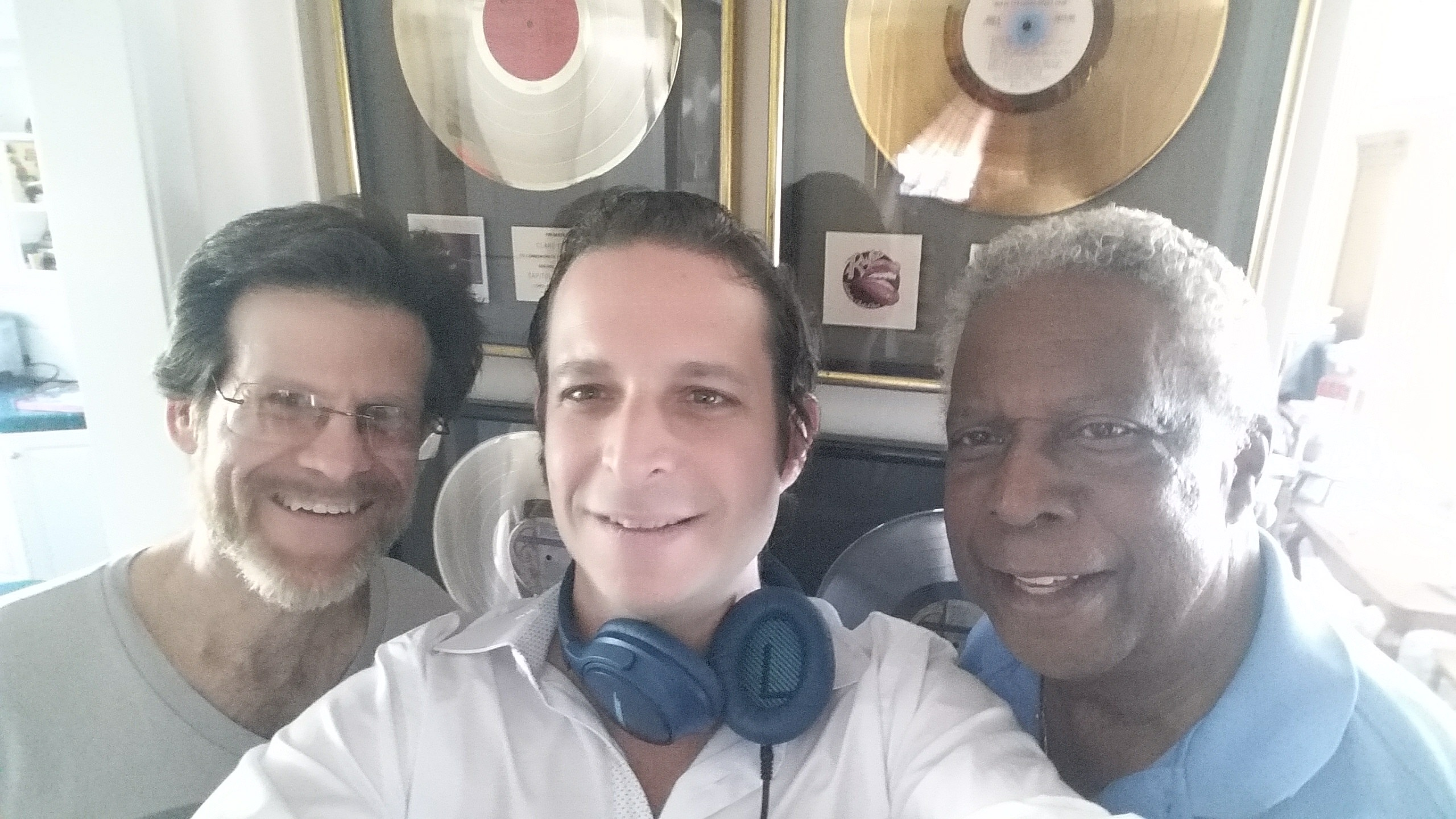
Brent Fischer (left), Kobi Arad (middle), Mickey Stevenson (co-founder of Motown records on right)

While living in Israel, Arad participated as a keyboardist in a trio with Asaf Sirkis and Gabriel Mayer in the 1990s. Arad also collaborated with Stevie Wonder and his manager, Stephanie Andrews at the Berklee Performance Center in 2005.

Arad released his album Sparks of Understanding in 2009, which featured drummer Bob Moses.

Arad collaborated with recording engineer Robert Margouleff on The Experience Project in 2015. In 2015, he also released the albums Webern Re-Visioned—which consisted of re-imaginings of works by Anton Webern, and Superflow, which is a collaboration with Roy Ayers, featuring bassist Jonathan Levy.

He also recorded Ellington Upside Down, a Duke Ellington tribute CD, with the Kobi Arad Band. The album's mashup of “Take the ‘A’ Train” and “It Don't Mean a Thing” was nominated for Best Jazz Instrumental at the 17th Independent Music Awards (2019). Arad's album Segments went on to win Best Jazz Instrumental in the album category at the same event.

At the 2021 Hollywood Music in Media (HMMA) Awards, Arad won the Independent Music Artist award in Best Jazz for his performance of “Bemsha Swing” by Thelonious Monk.

On June 12, 2024, Arad was nominated for the second time for the Hollywood Independent Music Awards with 'Fields' for Best Jazz Fusion (Best piano solo / collab). This nomination features Victor Wooten, Cindy Blackman Santana, Ricky Kej & Lonnie Park.

On July 31, 2025, his composition 'Weave' (using his improvisation–composition hybrid-based system 'Anchor Lines') won him a Hollywood Independent Music Award for Best Jazz.

In 2025, Arad was invited by Ricky Kej and Lonnie Park to collaborate as Executive Producer and sound advisor on their ambitious project 'Gandhi,' featuring Stewart Copeland.

== Discography (selected) ==
=== Albums ===
- Sparks of Understanding (2009)
- Ancient Novice (2009)
- Inner Hymns (2012)
- The Experience Project (2015)
- Webern Re-Visioned (2015)
- Superflow (2015)
- Cubism - Hyper-Dimensional Jazz (2016)
- Flux - A Song Cycle for Solo Fender Rhodes (2017)
- Ellington Upside Down (2017)
- Segments (2018)
- Intonations (2019)
- Sketches of Monk (2020)
- Warping (2024)

== Awards ==
Year	Award	Work	Nomination	Results
2019	17th Independent Music Awards	Segments (album)	Best Jazz Instrumental	Won
2021	Hollywood Music in Media (HMMA) Awards	“Bemsha Swing” by Thelonious Monk	Independent Music Artist award in Best Jazz	Won
2022	One Earth Awards	“Bemsha Swing” by Thelonious Monk	Best Jazz	Won
2024	Hollywood Independent Music Awards	"Fields"	Best piano solo / collab	Nominated
2025	Hollywood Independent Music Awards	“Weave”	Best Jazz	Won
