= Ayşedeniz Gökçin =

Turkish classical crossover pianist and composer (born 1988)

AyseDeniz Gokcin Ayşedeniz Gökçin
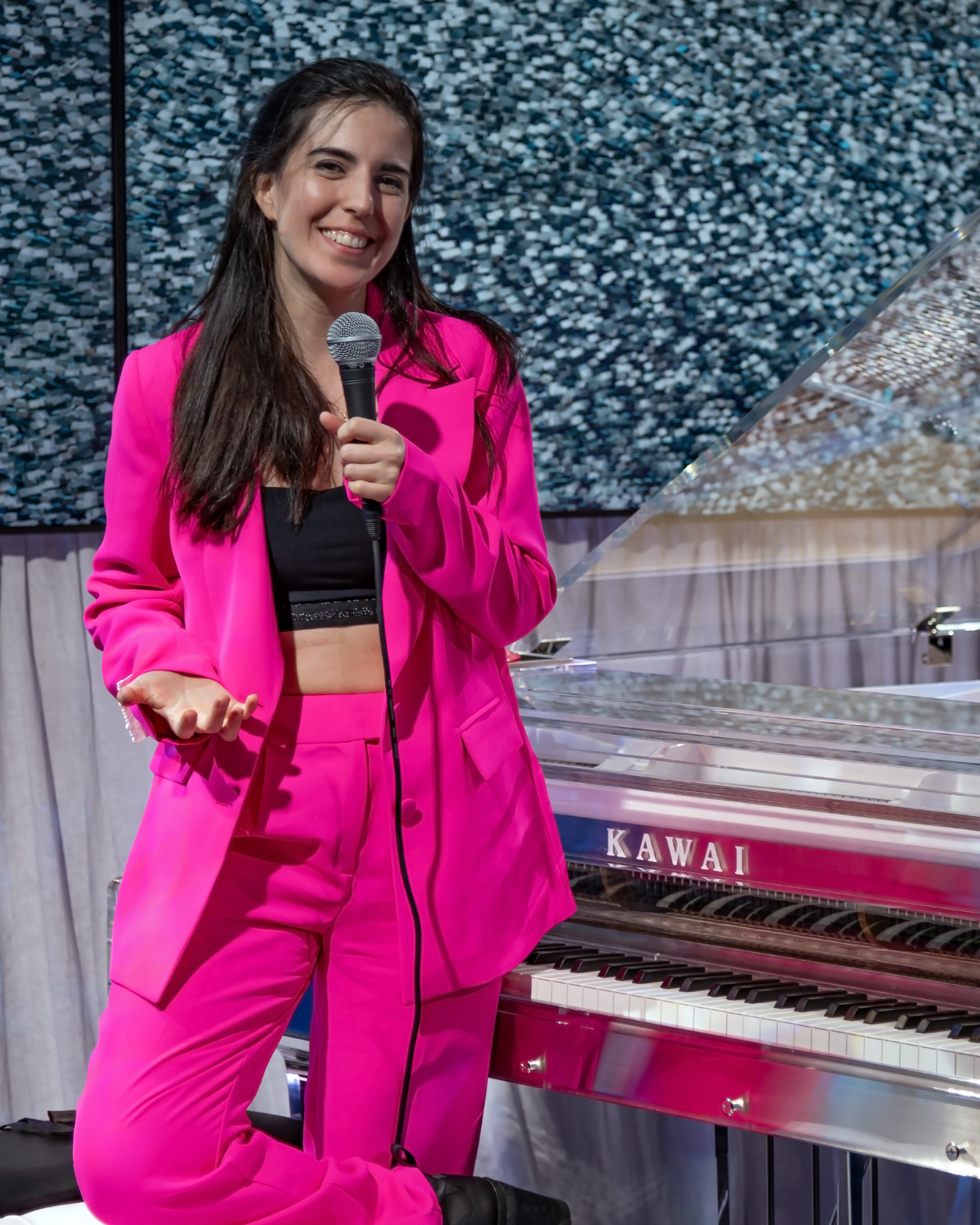

Background information
- Also known as: @ADpianist, アイシェデニーズ, 艾斯丹尼滋
- Born: January 4, 1988 (age 37)
- Genres: Classical crossover
- Occupation(s): Pianist, composer
- Instrument: Piano
- Website: www.adpianist.com

Ayşedeniz Gökçin (born January 4, 1988; anglicised as "AyseDeniz Gokcin") is a Turkish classical pianist and composer.

== Biography ==
After graduating in 2009 with a bachelor's degree from Eastman School of Music, Gökçin completed a master's degree at the Royal Academy of Music in 2011.

She is known for recording an EP of her arrangements for solo piano of the music of the rock band Pink Floyd in the style of Franz Liszt, Pink Floyd Lisztified. The EP comprises three tracks, which, she says, form a fantasia. These are:

1. "Hey You"
2. "Wish You Were Here"
3. "Another Brick in the Wall"

The first and third being from the 1979 album The Wall, the middle one the eponymous 1975 Wish You Were Here.

Gökçin describes her arrangement of Another Brick... as being inspired by Liszt's 'Dante Sonata'.

She has also recorded an album of reworkings of the music of Ástor Piazzolla.

Her album The Nirvana Project, launched in November 2015, is a virtuoso piano re-working of famous Nirvana songs, in collaboration with Bulgarian music producer and DJ Ivan Shopov.

Her latest original album, Patterns for piano and string orchestra, was released in June 2023.

On August 5, she made her Los Angeles debut at Walt Disney Concert Hall performing her compositions Kelton and Chaos with the LAKMA Orchestra.

On August 17, 2023, she won the Hollywood Independent Music Awards with her composition Kelton in the Contemporary Classical Category.

== Discography ==
=== Albums ===
Date	Album
2013	Classical Concept Tribute to Pink Floyd
2015	Nirvana Project
2016	Nirvana Classical
2016	Piano Playlist, Vol. 1
2017	A Chopin Affair: Sonatas
2019	Earth Prelude
2019	Beethoven Senses
2020	Hey World
2020	Dreamscape
2020	Motus
2023	Patterns

=== Singles and EPs ===
Date	Single or EP
2012	The Crying Harmonica & the Speechless Piano
2012	Classical EP
2013	Mozart: Alla Turca Jazz
2013	At Road's End
2013	Another Brick in the Wall
2013	Piazzolla Piano Pop
2016	Dream on
2018	In the End
2018	Milonga Del Angel
2018	Grenfell Tower Elegy
2018	Watches
2018	Comptine d`un autre ete - l`apres-midi (From "Amelie")
2018	Romantic Coldplay
2018	Imagine
2019	Nothing Else Matters
2019	Valse
2019	Fly
2019	Twice
2019	Su
2019	Novus
2019	Prelude Reimagined
2019	Pure Piano Suite
2020	Hey Jude
2020	Epilogue
2020	Dusk
2020	Cycle
2021	Winter Song
2021	Beethoven Remix
2021	No Time To Die
2021	Vivaldi Storm(Piano Solo)
