= Brynn Elliott =

American singer-songwriter (born 1994)

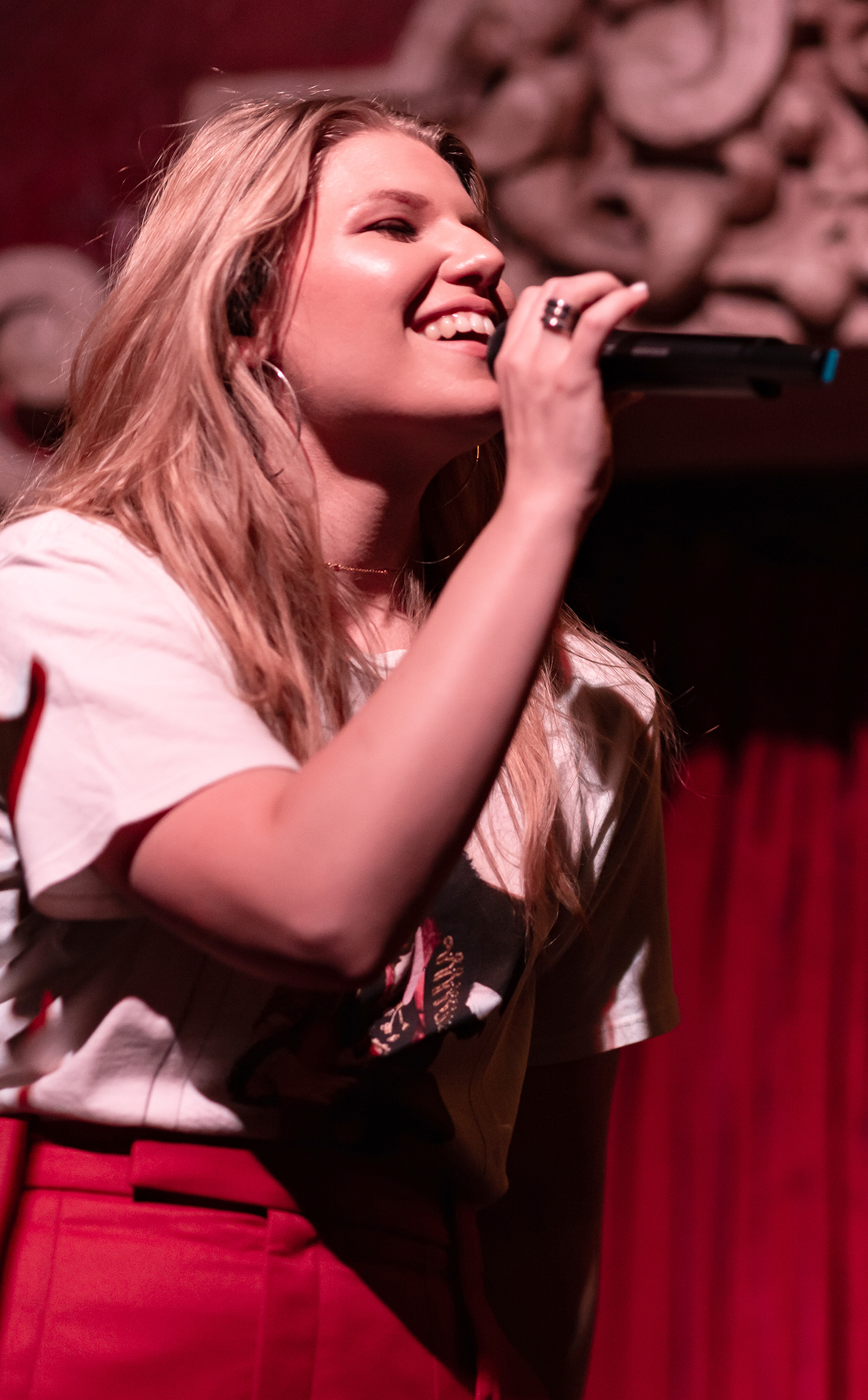

Background information
- Born: November 11, 1994 (age 32); Atlanta, Georgia, U.S.
- Genre: Pop
- Occupation: Singer-songwriter
- Instruments: guitar, piano
- Years active: 2014–present
- Labels: Atlantic Records; Big Yellow Dog Music
- Website: brynnelliott.com

Brynn Elliott (born November 11, 1994) is an American singer-songwriter who is currently signed to Atlantic Records and Big Yellow Dog Music. She has toured with acts like Alanis Morissette, Brandi Carlile, and Grace Potter. In May 2018, Elliott released her single "Time of Our Lives" and that September followed it with an extended play (EP) of the same name. Another single, "Might Not Like Me", has reached number 12 on the Billboard Adult Top 40 chart.

== Early life and education ==
Elliott grew up in Atlanta, Georgia, where she was homeschooled through high school. She taught herself how to play guitar at age 15. After graduating high school in 2013, she applied to Harvard University but was wait listed. A family friend had sent some of Elliott's recordings to producer Clif Magness. He invited her to Portland, Oregon, where she stayed for a year, interning and writing music with Magness. After that year, Elliott was accepted by Harvard, where she studied philosophy. She graduated from the university in 2018.

== Career ==
In April 2014, Elliott released dual EPs entitled Notions of Love and Notions of Youth. That summer, she went on tour with Tyler Ward. She would go on to open for Wilson Phillips and, later, Alanis Morissette that year. The next summer, she toured with various artists and also opened for Brandi Carlile on numerous occasions throughout the year. She would later tour with Grace Potter.

In 2017, she released two singles, "Might Not Like Me" and "Psycho Stupid Crazy," both of which featured a more pop bent than her previous records. She also often flew to Nashville, Tennessee to work on writing songs with record producer and frequent Taylor Swift collaborator, Nathan Chapman.

In May 2018, it was announced that Elliott had signed a record deal with Atlantic Records and Big Yellow Dog Music. She released her first major label single, "Time of Our Lives," at the time of the announcement. It was the first recording to be released as part of Atlantic and Big Yellow Dog's joint venture. She also re-released her single, "Might Not Like Me," later in 2018. Her debut major label EP, also entitled Time of Our Lives, was released on September 7, 2018 and was produced by Nathan Chapman. Throughout her career, Elliott has played more than 200 shows.

In September 2018, she performed "Might Not Like Me" on Live with Kelly and Ryan, marking her first national television appearance. In 2019, she announced that she is going on tour with American band Why Don't We and American singer Eben.

== Discography ==
=== EPs ===
List of EPs with selected album details
Title	Details
Notions of Love	Released: April 18, 2014 (US); Label: Independent; Formats: CD, Digital download
Notions of Youth	Released: April 18, 2014 (US); Label: Independent; Formats: CD, digital download
Time of Our Lives	Release date: September 7, 2018; Label: Atlantic, Big Yellow Dog; Formats: CD, digital download
Can I Be Real?	Release date: July 8, 2021; Label: Atlantic; Formats: digital download

=== Singles ===
List of singles, with selected chart positions, showing year released and album name
Title	Year	Peak chart positions	Album
Title	Year	US Adult	Album
"Might Not Like Me"	2018	12	Time of Our Lives
"Time of Our Lives"	2018	—	Time of Our Lives
"Tell Me I'm Pretty"	2021	22	Can I Be Real?
"—" denotes a single that did not chart or was not released in that territory.
