= Ghosted: Love Gone Missing =

American documentary television series

- Genre: Reality
- Presented by: Rachel Lindsay; Travis Mills
- Country of origin: United States
- Original language: English
- No. of seasons: 2
- No. of episodes: 17

Production
- Executive producers: Dan Adler; Nadim Amiry; Natalia Garcia; Leanne Mucci; Todd Radnitz; Matt Sharp; John Varela
- Production company: Sharp Entertainment

Original release
- Network: MTV
- Release: September 10, 2019 – February 12, 2021

Related
- Catfish: The TV Show; Help! I'm in a Secret Relationship!

Ghosted: Love Gone Missing is an American reality-based documentary television series airing on MTV about ghosting, which premiered on September 10, 2019. The series is co-hosted by Rachel Lindsay and Travis Mills.

The second season premiered on September 2, 2020. It was hosted virtually due to the COVID-19 pandemic.

== Episodes ==
=== Series overview ===
Season	Episodes	Originally released	
Season	Episodes	First released	Last released
1	8	September 10, 2019	October 15, 2019
2	9	September 2, 2020	February 12, 2021

=== Season 1 (2019) ===
No. overall	No. in season	Title	Original release date	U.S. viewers (millions)
1	1	"Julia & Delmond"	September 10, 2019	0.37
2	2	"Ross & Jordan"	September 10, 2019	0.29
3	3	"Brittney & Shey"	September 17, 2019	0.35
4	4	"Resee & Brendan"	September 17, 2019	0.26
5	5	"Kayla & Shawn"	September 24, 2019	0.26
6	6	"Russell & Destiney"	October 1, 2019	0.29
7	7	"Whitney & Tahira"	October 8, 2019	0.36
8	8	"Giovanna & Dante"	October 15, 2019	0.22

=== Season 2 (2020–21) ===
No. overall	No. in season	Title	Original release date	U.S. viewers (millions)
9	1	"Joanna & Aaron"	September 2, 2020	0.24
10	2	"Shannon & Jay"	September 9, 2020	0.25
11	3	"Mariah & James"	September 16, 2020	0.23
12	4	"Michael & Francisco"	September 23, 2020	0.21
13	5	"Naimah & Maher"	February 8, 2021	0.21
14	6	"Trey & Austin"	February 9, 2021	0.13
15	7	"Andi & Dade"	February 10, 2021	0.21
16	8	"Tini & Bri"	February 11, 2021	0.20
17	9	"All Bets Are Off"	February 12, 2021	0.14
