= Justin Chart =

American singer-songwriter and musician

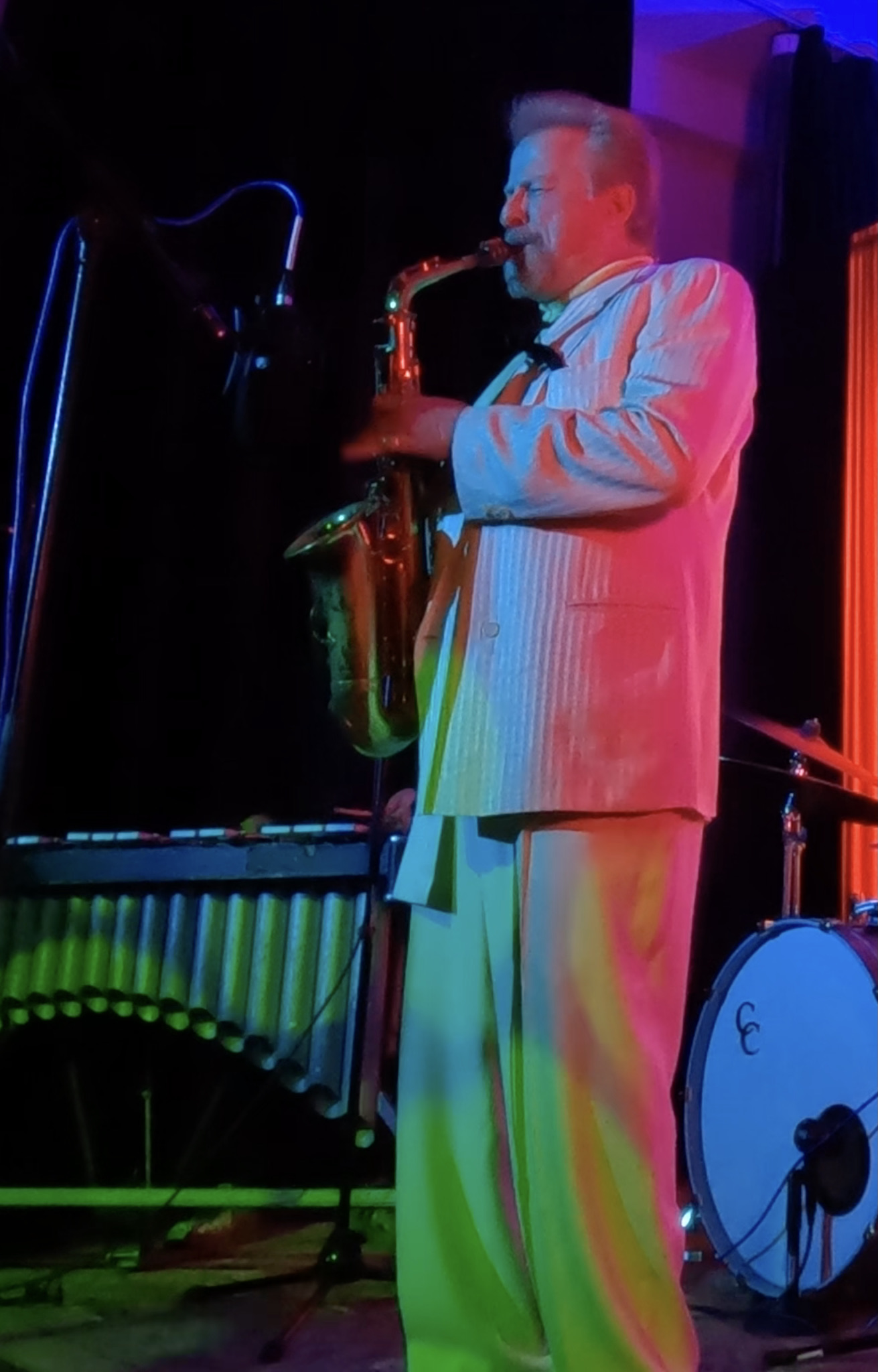
- Chart in 2022

Background information
- Born: 1959 or 1960 (age 66–67); Los Angeles, California, U.S.
- Genres: Jazz; rock
- Occupations: Musician; songwriter
- Instruments: Guitar; piano; saxophone; vocals
- Years active: 1993–present
- Website: justinchart.com; justinchartjazz.com

Justin Chart (born 1959 or 1960) is an American singer-songwriter and jazz musician. He is best known for "Los Angeles the Song", dedicated to his hometown. He has released eighteen albums during his career, primarily in the jazz genre.

== Biography ==
Chart was born in Los Angeles, California, to a musical family, and played piano, clarinet, and saxophone as a youth.

In 2012, Chart wrote, sang and produced "Los Angeles the Song". In the song, Chart performs with 40 other singers and three rappers from all 25 of Los Angeles' sister cities. The cast sang in 28 different languages spoken by people on six different continents, as a gesture to L.A.'s multiculturalism. The videos of the song feature scenes from L.A. including the Venice boardwalk and downtown Los Angeles. The has a Latin beat and features his daughter Tali on keyboard. Chart was awarded the Artisan Appreciation Award in July 2014 by L.A. Mayor Eric Garcetti, who praised his ability to capture "through song for people to enjoy and understand this passion for the city we all call home."

== Discography ==
- The February Feeling (2017; recorded 1993)
- Return of the Knight (2017; recorded 1995)
- Los Angeles: An Anthem (2017)
- All That Is Just (2018)
- The Jammiest Bit O Jam (2019)
- Colorstorm (2020)
- Colorstorm IV (2021)
- Colorstorm VI (2021)
- Intuition (2021)
- Live in Los Angeles (2021)
- The Scarlet Jazz Room (2022)
- The Midnight People (2022)
- Keep the Blue (2022)
- Avenue (2023)
- Prosper (2023)
- Right On (2023)
- Today's Tomorrow (2024)
- Night Heat (2024)
