= Shevyn Roberts =

American singer, actress and dancer

- Born: Houston, Texas
- Occupations: Singer, actress, dancer
- Known for: HMMA (Hollywood Music Media Award in 2013)

Shevyn Roberts is an American singer, actress and dancer. She has won multiple nominations and awards for her music, including the Hollywood Music in Media Award, in 2013, for the songs 'Superstitious', 'Upside Down' and 'Better than the First Time.'

In 2010, she opened Shevyn's Dance Academy, a non-profit organization for kids offering ballet, jazz and hip-hop dance classes. And in 2012, she was named one of Music Connection Magazine's Hot 100 Unsigned Artists & Bands of the year and has opened for such prominent singers as Justin Bieber. In addition, she has won multiple awards for her dancing, including six National Solo Dance Championships with the American Dance/Drill Team School and Showtime International. She is also known as an actor, being featured in such TV shows as Days of Our Lives and such films as Dead Ant, where she played a rock star.
