= Kim Cameron (musician) =

American singer

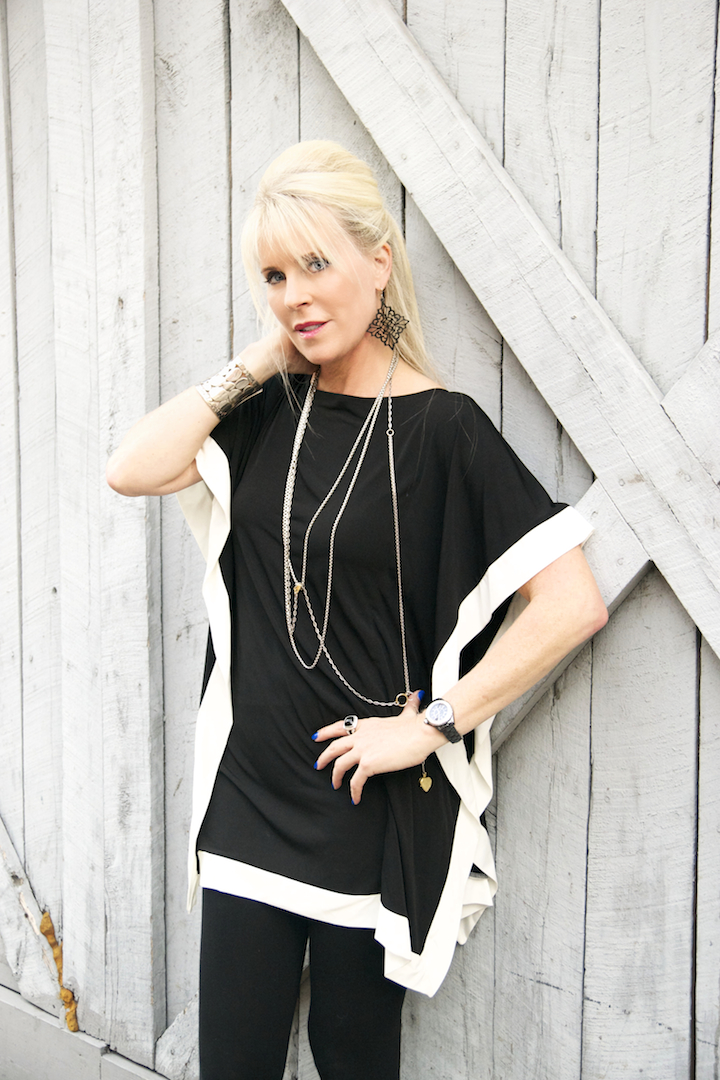

Background information
- Born: Kim MacGregor Cameron; November 28, 1966; Eau Claire, Wisconsin, U.S.
- Genre: Pop
- Occupations: Singer, songwriter, author
- Instruments: Vocals, piano
- Years active: 2005–present
- Website: kimcameronmusic.com

Kim Cameron (born November 28, 1966) is an American recording artist, songwriter, pole dancer, radio personality, animated filmmaker, and author of children's books from Miami, Florida. Her electronic dance music incorporates elements of rock, pop, R&B, and jazz.

== Early life ==
Kim MacGregor Cameron, Los Angeles native, was born in Eau Claire, Wisconsin on November 28, 1966. Her father, Paul Cameron, was a professor of psychology, and her mother, Virginia Cameron, was a teacher. She has an older brother, Kirk, and a younger sister, Karyn. She began her music education in St. Mary's, Maryland, where she learned to play clarinet at the age of six. She went on to perform in several marching bands after she moved to Thousand Oaks, California, where she also performed as the lead actor in the musical The Pirates of Penzance.

After several lead roles in musicals and plays such as Grease, Li'l Abner, and King David, she was selected for the choral group Singers, as well as the Indian Hills Choir in Lincoln, Nebraska. At the same time, she finished first in the state in the Nebraska for Poetry Interpretation at the Nebraska State's Speech competition and fourth in the nation.

Cameron attended the University of Nebraska–Lincoln for three years, completing her broadcasting major courses before finishing internship in broadcast journalism and her Bachelor of Arts degree in Journalism degree at Wichita State University in 1988.

== Early career ==
Cameron began her broadcast career as a radio personality at KHAT-FM, in Lincoln, Nebraska. A year later, she took an internship at KAKE-TV in Wichita, Kansas. She moved to the east coast and began a corporate career developing training and promotional videos for information technology companies. She worked at MCI as the National Training Manager for several years before moving to Siebel Systems as a Practice Manager.

In the early 1990s, Cameron began performing in a local cover band in Washington, D.C. After ten years of working the D.C. clubs, the band took a break after the father of one of the band members was murdered.

In 2007, Cameron left her work as a corporate executive to pursue a full-time career in music. She wrote her first song, "Never Forget", about her brother-in-law. After attempting to produce her own album in 2007, she was introduced to Marco Delmar from Recording Arts. The album, Contradictions, was re-produced by Delmar and released in September 2008.

Cameron creates pulsating, electronic rhythms in her concerts through her recording and touring band. Her live performance group is composed of musicians, a deep house DJ, and Dominican percussionist Pablo Peña, better known as "Pablito Drum."

Over the past 14+ years, she has performed for the NFL twice (Giants, Redskins), National League once (Marlins Baseball), and numerous other prestigious international music festivals, including Xiamen Music Festival in China, Dubrovnik Wave Festival in Croatia, and Komen's for a Cure in Miami.

Cameron started as a radio host for an FM station as part of her Broadcast Journalism major before switching to writing for the National Examiner and Smithsonian.

== Billboard success ==
Cameron secured placement for three months on American Airlines's inflight entertainment. With one of her songs written about a military man she met on a plane, she became known within the American military community, and her songs were granted airtime on Great Americans, Hooah Radio, Mil Bloggers, VA News and the Pentagon Channel.

Cameron signed a short one-year contract with Realize Records. She released her second album, Turning Point, in 2010 using both Marco Delmar and Robert Jazayeri as producers. The album had some charting success on adult album alternative and College Music Journal radio stations. She self-financed her first tour, which took her through 20 states in 2010. She received a not-so-favorable article in Smart Money, but later garnered positive performance reviews from music trade publications.

In November 2010, she terminated her relationship with Realize Records and continued to self-publish her original songs. She released "Sexy Smile", the first single from her third album, The Blond Side, in September 2010. This was Cameron's first foray into commercial radio, and she hit No. 103 on Mediabase in November, staying on the charts for seven weeks. In November 2010, she released her first Christmas original song, "My Memories of Christmas", which was aired by 30 Top 40 commercial stations in the first week.

Cameron released "A Dance" in January 2011, which hit No. 31 on Billboard's Adult Top 40 in May 2011. She released "Paradise" for the Adult Contemporary genre in February 2011. Cameron hit No. 31 on that chart, and stayed on it for 16 weeks.

In January 2012, Cameron released a music video for "3 Seconds" via YouTube, which garnered over 1 million views in less than two months. In March 2012, she was signed to Huber Entertainment, based out of Minneapolis, Minnesota. Her fourth album, Spin Me Ever After, was released. The music video for "Man I Used to Know" received over 2.4 million YouTube views in weeks. The year was finished with an international tour and the Universal Conquest Award for Album of the Year.

In 2013, Cameron's live performance concert was placed on Comcast Xfinity onDemand in the Washington, DC metro market, New England, and Northern California. It was also placed on Time Warner's Staten Island cable network.

In July 2013, producer/remixer Mike Rizzo remixed the single "Not into You".

In 2014, the single "Now You're Mine" became Cameron's second Top 20 Billboard hit.

She charted twice on Billboard's Dance Club Songs list with her singles "Not Into You" and "Now You're Mine."

In 2014, Cameron released her next hit, "Let's Fall in Love". By 2024, she had additional Billboard success with the song "Meet Me After Midnight" landing at #5 for Dance/Electronic Digital Sales.

== Film and television ==
Cameron is the director, producer, and screenplay writer of animation films and Miami's Listening Party. In 2019, she directed and starred in her debut short film, the documentary Carpe Musicam. It was featured in the Flickfair Film Festival and was made available on Amazon.

On December 10, 2021, Cameron wrote, directed, and produced the award-winning 88-minute 2-D animation feature film Seaper Powers In Search of Bleu Jay’s Treasure, which was picked up as a Dove Channel original (Cinedigm), then moved to Mutlivisionaire in 2023 and Toons TV. It has won accolades for Best Soundtrack, Best Script, Best Female Director, Best Trailer, and Best Animated Feature.

She signed with SeemaTV to produce 24 episodes of Miami’s Listening Party, whose pilot was released in May 2023. In August 2023, she released the award-winning 66-minute 2-D animation sequel feature film Seaper Powers Mystery of the Blue Pearls. In January 2023, as an executive director and producer, Cameron released the This is Kim documentary on SeemaTV networks. A third Seaper Powers film, The Rescue, is in production since March 2023.

Cameron received recognition for her musical Her Story from the Amsterdam Film Festival and the New York Screenplay.

== Author ==
Since 2013, Cameron has written three children's books as part of the Seaper Powers series. The books are available in hard copy, eBook, and audiobook (including original scoring). Cameron continues to travel across the country as part of the series' national book tour/puppet show.

Seaper Powers book series:

- In Search of Bleu Jay's Treasure
- The Mystery of the Blue Pearls
- The Rescue
- The Riddle
- The Red Carpet

== Radio airplay charts ==
Year	Chart	Song	Category	Peak chart positions
2024	iTunes	"Meet Me at Midnight" (single/UK)	Dance Daily	1
2024	iTunes	"Meet Me at Midnight" (single/US)	Electronic Daily	1
2024	Billboard	"Meet Me at Midnight" (single)	Dance	5
2013	Billboard	"Not Into You" (single)	Dance	17
2014	Billboard	"Now You're Mine" (single)	Dance	18
2016	Cashbox	"Moon on the Water" (single)	National Airplay Top 100 Independent	17
2022	Starfleet Music Pool	"Love Story" (remix)	Dance	1
2022	Starfleet Music Pool	"Perfect"	Dance	33
2023	DJ Life Club Play Chart	"Home" (single)	National Dance/Crossover	24

== Awards ==
Year	Nominated work	Category	Award	Result
2023	Kim Cameron	Artist of the Year (multi-genre female)	Josie Music Award	Nominated
2021	Sunrise	Best Jazz	Hollywood Music in Media Award	Nominated
2021	Jeepers, Creepers, Seapers	Best Children's Music	Hollywood Music in Media Award	Nominated
2018	Spin Me Ever After	Best Cinematography	Madrid Film Awards	Won
2018	"Dancing in the Dark" (Bimbo Jones Remix)	Best Recording	Indie Music Channel Award	Nominated
2018	Dancing in the Dark	Dance	American Songwriting Award	Won
2018	Share My Pillow	Silver Medal	Global Music Award	Won
2018	Dancing in the Dark	Best Dance	Clouzine Award	Won
2018	Dancing in the Dark	Silver Winner	International Independent Film Award	Won
2017	"Wanna Go"	Best Music Video	Switzerland International Film Festival	Won
2017	"Moon on the Water"	Best Dance Song	Global Music Award	Won
2012	Spin Me Ever After	Album of the Year	Universal Conquest Award	Nominated
2011	Kim Cameron	Top 100 Unsigned Acts	Music Connection	Won

== Discography ==
=== Albums ===
- Contradictions (2008)
- Turning Point (2010)
- The Blond Side (2011), produced by Richie Cannata of JLo and Billy Joel
- Spin Me Ever After (2012)
- Still Spinning (2013)
- No Regrets (2015)
- Naturally Yours (2016)
- Entwined (2017)
- Greatest Hits (2018)
- Connecting to Animals (2020)
- Seaper Powers the Movie Soundtrack (2020)
- Carpe Musicam (2019/2020)
- All Love (2021–2022)
- Influencers 2023
- Influencers the Remixes 2023

=== Singles ===
- "Let's Fall in Love" (2014)
- "Now You're Mine" (2014)
- "Didn't Know I was Fallin" (2019)
- "Fearless Lovers" (2018)
- "Share My Pillow" (2018)
- "Tip Toe" (2020)
- "Simply Naked" (2019)
- "Take Me Back" (2018)
- "Tighter" (2019)

=== Itunes charts ===
- "Running Past the Line" Dance USA #2 (2023)
- "Running Past the Line" Dance UK #31 (2023)
- "See Me" Sweden Dance #30 (2023)
- "Home" Sweden Dance #30 (2023)
- "Don't Give Me No" USA House #76 (2022)
- "Perfect" USA House #36 (2022)
- "Never" USA House #27 (2021)
- "Fearless Lovers" Australia House #25 (2021)
- "Dancing in the Dark" Canada House #35 (2021)
- "Never" UK Electronic #158 (2021)

=== BeatPort charts ===
- "Show Me You Feel" #3 (2021)
- "Forever" #1 (2021)
- "But You" #2 (2016)

=== Traxsource charts ===
- "Just in Time" #31 (2023)
