= Josie Music Awards =

United States music award organization

- Awarded for: Independent music in all forms from around the globe
- Location: Nashville, Tennessee
- Country: United States
- First award: 2015 (11 years ago)
- Website: josiemusicawards.com

The Josie Music Awards is an award organization in the United States honoring independent music in all forms and genres; vocalists, performers, songwriters, songs, albums, music videos, and music industry professionals, among others. The Josie Awards is one of the largest, multi-genre, privately-owned, independent awards show and the panel of judges is made up of musicians and music industry professionals.

The Josie Music Awards' first awards ceremony was in 2015. It is held annually in October. The ceremony features live music performances, tributes to music industry icons, and award presentations for composers, songwriters, and performers. Award ceremonies have been held at the Gaylord Opryland Resort & Convention Center, Schermerhorn Symphony Center, the Nissan Stadium, The Celebrity Theater in Dollywood, and The Grand Ole Opry House.

Past recipients of the Lifetime Career Achievement Award and those inducted into the Independent Country Music Hall of Fame include, Lacy J. Dalton, Vern Gosdin, William Lee Golden, Razzy Bailey, Lulu Roman, Bobby G. Rice, Bucky Covington, and T. Graham Brown, among others.

== Categories ==
Artistry and Performance

- Songwriter of the Year
- Entertainer of the Year
- Vocalist of the Year (multiple genres)
- Musician of the Year (multiple genres)
- JMA Outstanding Performance
- Rising Star (male/female)
- Artist of the Year (multiple genres)
- World Artist of the Year
- Duo/Group of the Year (multiple genres)
- Music Video of the Year
- Social Impact Video of the Year
- Best Performance in a Music Video (male/female)
- Tribute Artist/Band of the Year (multiple genres)
- Fans Choice (male/female)

Recorded Music

- Song of the Year
- Album of the Year
- EP of the Year
- Vocal Event of the Year
- Social Impact Song of the Year

Music Industry Professionals

- Public Relations Company of the Year
- Record Label of the Year
- Photographer of the Year
- Promotion Company of the Year
- Management Company of the Year
- Video Production of the Year
- Music Producer of the Year
- Media Company of the Year
- Music Venue of the Year

Achievement Awards

- Songwriters Achievement of the Year
- Lifetime Career Achievement
- Humanitarian of the Year
- Induction into the Independent Country Hall of Fame

=== 2026 ===
At the 12th Annual Josie Music Awards held at the Grand Ole Opry House, the song "Jai Shivaji, Jai Bhavani", created by Mahesh Mahadev and Priyadarshini, won the Best Music Video - Global award.
