= Jonathan Estabrooks =

Canadian record producer

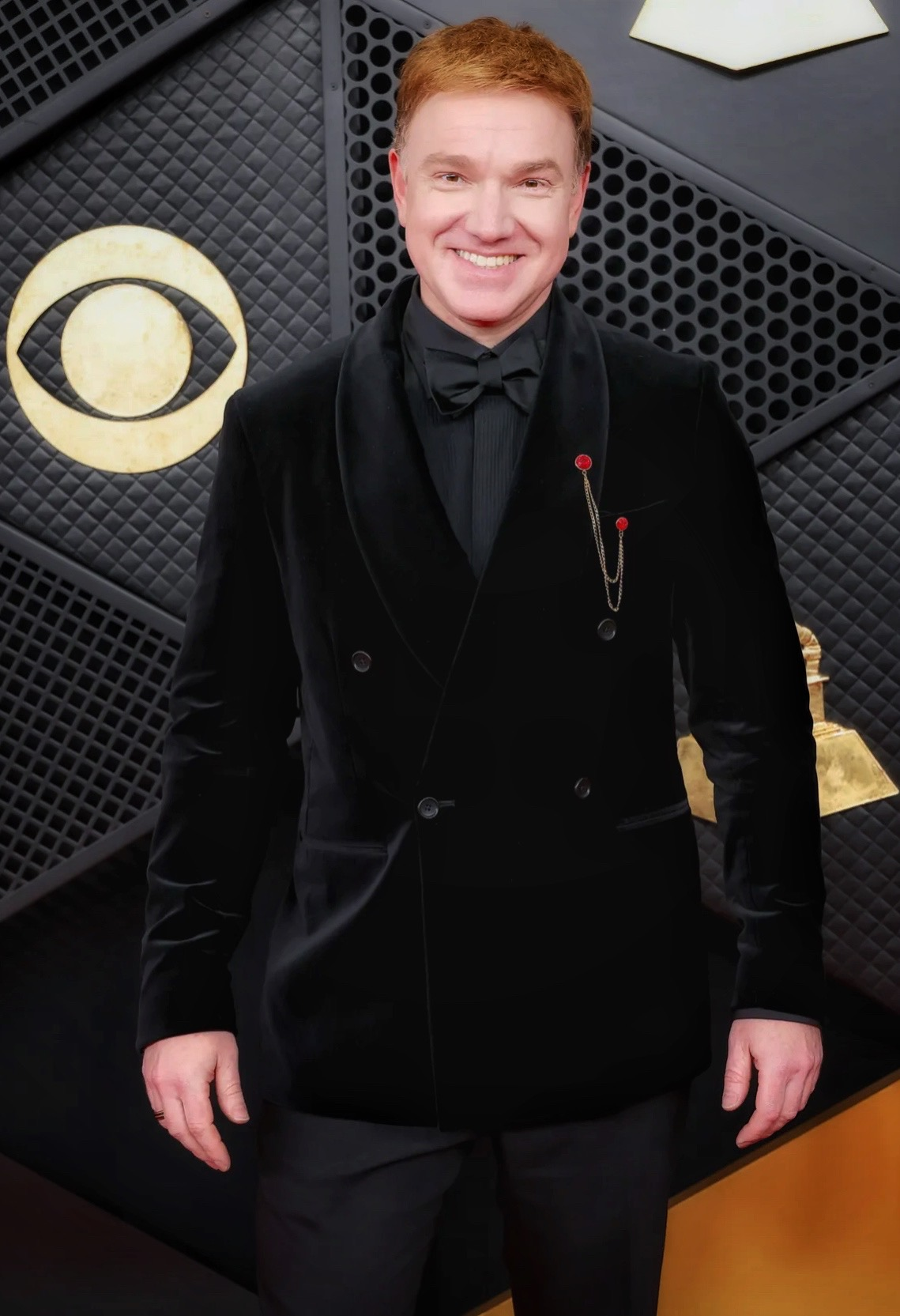

Background information
- Born: Jonathan Matthew Estabrooks; July 15, 1983; Ottawa, Ontario, Canada
- Genres: Opera, classical-crossover musical theatre
- Occupations: Producer, Vocal Producer, Mixing Engineer, Singer, Filmmaker
- Instrument: Baritone
- Years active: 1990–present
- Website: www.emitha.com

Jonathan Estabrooks (born 1983) is a two-time Grammy Award nominated Canadian record producer who has worked with Josh Groban, Sting, Lin-Manuel Miranda, Kristin Chenoweth and more. He is a trained operatic baritone, and graduate of the Juilliard School.

On November 16, 2026, Estabrooks received his second Grammy Award nomination as producer and mixing engineer for "My Brother's Keeper" in the Grammy Award for Best Classical Compendium category, the latest release from the New York Festival of Song, Steven Blier, Joshua Blue, Will Liverman, Joseph Parrish, Chaz’men Williams-Ali, Jorell Williams and Alan Williams.

In November 2025, Estabrooks received his first Grammy Award nomination with Will Liverman for the album titled "The Dunbar/Moore Sessions Vol. II. in the Grammy Award for Best Classical Compendium category. That same year he produced a further three Grammy Award nominated albums in the Best Classical Vocal Solo Album category including "Black Pierrot" by Sidney Outlaw and Warren Jones, "In This Short Life" by Devony Smith and Danny Zelibor and "Schubert Beatles" by Theo Hoffman and Steven Blier, pianist and co-founder of the New York Festival of Song.

In 2024, Estabrooks co-produced the Grammy Award nominated album Impossible Dream for American actor and singer Aaron Lazar. The album was nominated for a Grammy Award for "Best Traditional Pop Vocal Album" in November, 2024. It included duets with Josh Groban, Neil Patrick Harris, Leslie Odom Jr, Loren Allred, Kelli O'Hara, Kate Baldwin, and featured Sting and appearances from Kristin Chenoweth, Lin-Manuel Miranda and many more. It was released on August 23, 2024, by Lexicon Classics and was developed by Studio Seven Media and Emitha LLC. Fellow producers included Kitt Wakeley, Aaron Lazar, Patrick Conlon, David Das and Christina Giacona. It charted at #2 on Billboard's Classical Crossover Album chart in September, 2024.

Jonathan has produced and mixed over 75 projects to date in the classical, jazz and crossover genres. He was executive producer and creator of Artists for the Arts, a charity single and music video in support of Americans for the Arts and their efforts to save the National Endowment for the Arts He was active in the Canadian and American opera, concert and musical theatre worlds and on YouTube.

== Early life and education ==
Estabrooks was born and raised in Ottawa, Canada. He earned a Bachelors in Music Performance from the University of Toronto in Toronto, Canada and a Masters of Music from the Juilliard School.

== Music career ==
Born in Ottawa, Ontario, Estabrooks began his musical training as a member of the Opera Lyra Ottawa Boys Choir and Opera Lyra Chorus. He first sang with orchestra in 1994 as the Shepherd Boy in Tosca by Puccini. In 1993 he joined the Company of Musical Theatre, appearing is such productions as Annie, Oliver!, the Will Rogers Follies and West Side Story.

In October 1999, he sang as part of a vocal quartet for the opening of a new US Embassy in Ottawa, Ontario for then President Bill Clinton and Prime Minister of Canada Jean Chrétien.

He earned his Bachelor of Music from the University of Toronto in 2006 and his Masters of Music from the Juilliard School in 2009, where he was a student of Marlena Malas. He is a graduate of Ashbury College. He has coached with Brian Zeger, Joan Dornemann, Craig Rutenberg, Margo Garrett, Nico Castel, Joan Dornemann and Denise Massé.

Estabrooks sang with the Juilliard Orchestra for the New York Premiere of Siarra, a work for baritone and orchestra as part of the 2009 Juilliard Focus Festival. Estabrooks was a finalist in the 2007 Bryan Law Opera Competition and the 2009 Lyndon Woodside Solo Competition performed at Carnegie Hall.

He made his National Arts Centre Orchestra debut in 2007, with Pinchas Zukerman conducting and his National Arts Centre recital debut in 2009.

Estabrooks was the baritone soloist in Brahms' Eine Deutsches Requiem with Coro Vivo Ottawa in 2008 and has also performed with the Kennett Symphony of Chester County and the Aldeburgh Connection recital series. He was also a 2009 finalist in the Brian Law Opera Scholarship in Ottawa sponsored by the National Capital Opera Society. He appeared with pianist Joel Harder at the Caramoor Festival, presenting three concerts for the Holiday Musicale series at the Rosen House.

On June 19, 2009, in Ottawa, he made his National Arts Centre Recital debut with soprano Meghan McPhee as participants in the NAC Summer Music Institute. Other recent credits include performances with the Israeli Chamber Orchestra, and a 20-city tour in L’Elisir d’Amore with Jeunesses Musicales. In April, at New York's Weill Recital Hall, Estabrooks won the top prize in a competition presented by the Oratorio Society of New York.

Estabrooks made his Opera Lyra Ottawa main-stage debut in the role of Silvio in September 2011 at the National Arts Centre. He debuted with the Greenwich Choral Society singing the baritone solo for In Terra Pax and a world premiere by composer Rob Mathes.

He made his Toronto Symphony Orchestra debut on October 9 and 10, 2012 with conductor Steven Reineke in a program entitled "Some Enchanted Evening: The Music of Rodgers & Hammerstein" with Broadway stars Ashley Brown and Aaron Lazar. He returned to Roy Thomson Hall with the Toronto Symphony Orchestra on May 20 and 21, 2014 to perform in Classical Broadway: Lerner and Loewe.

On March 5, 2013, Estabrooks made his Carnegie Hall-Stern Auditorium Debut with conductor Kent Tritle and the Oratorio Society of New York in the New York premiere of Paul Moravec's Blizzard Voices.

He appeared as the Baron in the Opera Lyra Ottawa production of La Traviata on March 21 and 23, 2013 with the National Arts Centre Orchestra and Corrine Winters, Eric Magiore, Marion Newman, Gregory Dahl and conductor Tyrone Paterson.

On July 15, 2013, Estabrooks successfully raised US$25,730 on the funding website Kickstarter for the recording of his debut album with orchestra. Titled These Miles, it was released on April 8, 2014. Collaborations included tenor Jonathan Antoine, formerly of the duo Jonathan and Charlotte, and New Age classical pianist and composer Jennifer Thomas (pianist). It was produced by Dave Reitzas, Oran Eldor and himself.

On November 21 and 22, 2014, Estabrooks made his debut with the Vancouver Symphony Orchestra with Steven Reineke, tenor David Curry, and soprano Amy Wallis.

In March 2015, he made his debut with the Seattle Symphony with conductor Steven Reineke in a program titled Some Enchanted Evening: A Rodgers & Hammerstein Celebration with Broadway stars Ashley Brown and Aaron Lazar.

On September 24, 2015, he played the lead role of Bum Phillips in Bum Phillips All American Opera. The performance marked the opera's Houston premiere at the Stafford Township Arts Center and a benefit for the Dan Pastorini charity.

On March 7, 2017, executive producer Estabrooks, producer Michael J. Moritz Jr., Broadway orchestrator Charlie Rosen, and producer Van Dean of Broadway Records gathered performers for a single and video to benefit Americans for the Arts. Their gospel-tinged cover of The Beatles' "With a Little Help from My Friends" was released on March 23, 2017. Participating artists included Annie Golden, Chris Mann and Peter Hollens; Broadway stars Telly Leung, Lexi Lawson, Liz Callaway, Ektor Rivera, Bryan Terrell Clark (Hamilton), Lillias White, Aaron Lazar, Ashley Brown, Carmen Cusack, Cass Dillon, Lauren Jelencovich (Yanni Vocalist), and Noah Stewart; spoken word artists Taylor Mali, Trace DePass, and Shanelle Gabriel; cabaret stars Natalie Douglas and KT Sullivan; and a pop chorus of 50 accompanied by full orchestra.

In October 2019, Estabrooks created the role of Mat Burke in the world premiere production of Anna Christie, a music drama based on the Eugene O'Neill play. It was composed by Edward Thomas with libretto by Joseph Masteroff and produced by Encompass New Opera Theatre at Baruch College Performing Arts Centre. A recording with the original cast, produced by Thomas Z. Shepard and conducted by Julian Wachner, with the orchestra NOVUS New York, was released by Broadway Records on August 16, 2019. It was a collaboration of Trinity Church and Encompass New Opera Theatre, and it debuted at #6 on the Billboard classical album chart.

On September 15, 2020, The NYC center produced a celebration of the late Jessye Norman on what would have been the operatic soprano's 75th birthday. It was produced in partnership by Kenneth Overton, Jonathan Estabrooks, Miranda Plant, and Ras Dia. Artists included Emmy nominee Laverne Cox, Pulitzer Prize finalist Anna Deavere Smith, J'Nai Bridges, Harolyn Blackwell, Martina Arroyo, Simon Estes, Damien Sneed, George Shirley, Measha Brueggergosman, Krysty Swann, Karen Slack, Chauncey Packer, John Holiday, Audrey DuBois-Harris, Sidney Outlaw, Justin Austin, Brandie Sutton, and Russell Thomas, plus Norman's family and students from the Jessye Norman School of the Arts.

In July 2021, Jonathan joined Emitha LLC as a producer and vice president of production. Jonathan has produced and mixed over 75 albums in the classical, crossover and jazz fields, including such distinguished artists as Grammy Award award winning baritone Will Liverman, the Grammy Award winning National Children's Chorus, Metropolitan Opera star Tamara Wilson, Grammy Award winning mezzo-sopranos Isabel Leonard and Sasha Cooke and the New York Festival of Song among others.

Lament, produced by Mr. Estabrooks for baritone Sidney Outlaw and Warren Jones, reached #2 on the Billboard Traditional Classical chart.

On June 14, 2024, it was announced that broadway star Aaron Lazar, recently diagnosed with ALS, would release a star-studded album entitled Impossible Dream after the idea was proposed to him by Estabrooks. Produced by Kitt Wakeley, himself, Aaron Lazar, Christina Giacona, David Das and Patrick Conlon, it was released on August 23, 2024, featuring duets with Lazar and a who's who of Broadway stars—including Josh Groban, Kelli O’Hara, Leslie Odom Jr., Neil Patrick Harris, Kate Baldwin, Norm Lewis, Loren Allred and joining them on the title track are Kristin Chenoweth, Brian Stokes Mitchell, Sting, Lin-Manuel Miranda, and more than 50 other performers.

== Awards ==
Year	Nominated work	Category	Award	Result
2026	Schubert Beatles	Best Classical Record	Libera Awards	Nominated
2026	The Dunbar/Moore Sessions Vol. II	Best Classical Record	Libera Awards	Nominated
2026	The Dunbar/Moore Sessions Vol. II	Best Classical Compendium	Grammy Award	Nominated
2026	Black Pierrot	Best Classical Solo Vocal Album	Grammy Award	Nominated
2026	In This Short Life	Best Classical Solo Vocal Album	Grammy Award	Nominated
2026	Schubert Beatles	Best Classical Solo Vocal Album	Grammy Award	Nominated
2025	Echoes of Grace	Best Classical Album	World Entertainment Awards	Nominated
2024	Impossible Dream	Best Traditional Pop Vocal Album	Grammy Award	Nominated
2024	The Impossible Dream	Best Music Video	Hollywood Music in Media Award	Nominated
2024	Echoes of Grace	Best Choral Performance	Global Music Awards	Won
2024	Let Your Soul Be Your Pilot	Best Production/Producer	Hollywood Independent Music Awards	Won
2024	Let Your Soul Be Your Pilot	Best Music Production/Producer	Josie Music Award	Nominated

== Honors and distinctions ==
- 2011: First Place winner, Oratorio Society of New York's Lyndon Woodside Oratorio-Solo Competition.

== Discography ==
Year	Album	Artist	Credit
2025	All Is Bright	Sarah Timm	Producer, Mixing Engineer
2025	Black Pierrot	Sidney Outlaw, Warren Jones	Producer, Mixing Engineer, Mastering Engineer
2025	In This Short Life	Devony Smith, Danny Zelibor	Producer, Mixing Engineer
2025	Dunbar/Moore Sessions: Volume II	Will Liverman	Producer, Mixing Engineer
2025	Schubert Beatles	Theo Hoffman, Steven Blier	Producer, Mixing Engineer
2024	Still Standing	Peter Lake	Producer, Mixing Engineer
2024	Impossible Dream	Aaron Lazar	Producer, Vocal Producer
2024	Echoes of Grace: Choral Music of Patti Drennan	Sterling Ensemble Los Angeles	Producer
2024	Bridge to Peace: Invocation	Allison Charney, Will Liverman	Producer, Mixing Engineer
2024	A Miracle in Legacy	Joshua Conyers	Producer
2024	Zwei Gesänge Op. 91	Sidney Outlaw	Producer, Mixing Engineer
2024	NYFOS Records: The Singles - Volume 1	New York Festival of Song	Producer
2023	Illumine	National Children's Chorus	Vocal Producer
2023	Songs of Dominick Argento	Abi Levis	Producer, Mixing Engineer
2023	Dunbar/Moore Sessions: Volume 1	Will Liverman	Producer, Mixing Engineer
2023	Becoming	La Caccina	Producer
2023	Mi País: Songs of Argentina	New York Festival of Song	Producer, Mixing Engineer
2023	No One Is Forgotten	Dallas Opera	Producer, IA Producer, Editor, Vocal Engineer
2023	Archetype	Stephen Powell	Producer
2023	It's You I Like	Megan Marino	Producer, Mixing Engineer
2023	Schottische und Walisische Volkslieder	Stephen C. Edwards	Producer
2023	Black and Blue	Joshua Blue, New York Festival of Song	Producer, Mixing Engineer
2022	A Picnic Cantata	New York Festival of Song	Producer
2022	Brundibár	National Children's Chorus	Engineer
2022	A Bright Tomorrow	Kenneth Overton	Producer, Mixing Engineer
2022	A Very Merry Cowgirl Christmas	Opera Cowgirls	Producer, Mixing Engineer
2022	Al menos cantos	Laura Virella	Producer, Mixing Engineer
2022	Tiffany's Spellbook	Tamara Wilson	Producer, Mixing Engineer
2022	From Rags to Riches	New York Festival of Song	Producer
2022	Lament	Sidney Outlaw	Producer, Mixing Engineer
2021	Come To Your Senses (single)	Brittney Leigh Morton	Producer, Mixing Engineer
2021	A Whole New World (single)	John Riesen, Lauren Jelencovich	Producer, Mixing Engineer
2021	Live With Somebody You Love (single)	John Riesen, Jay Dref	Producer, Mixing Engineer
2021	Take Me As I Am (single)	John Riesen, Katrina Thurman	Producer, Mixing Engineer
2021	Agony (single)	John Riesen, Jonathan Estabrooks	Artist, Producer, Mixing Engineer
2021	I'm There (single)	John Riesen, Elyse Kakacek	Producer, Mixing Engineer
2021	Maria (single)	John Riesen	Producer, Mixing Engineer
2021	Lily's Eyes (single)	Jonathan Estabrooks, John Riesen	Artist, Producer, Mixing Engineer
2021	The Nothing Lamp	Jessica Fishenfeld	Producer, Mixing Engineer

== Solo discography ==
These Miles
Independent (CD: April 8, 2014, ASIN: B00IT4YEFQ)

1. Play Me – 3:54
2. Kathy's Song – 3:36
3. Time After Time – 4:51
4. Le Cose Che Tu Sei— 4:39
5. Calling You – 5:12
6. She – 4:29
7. Por Una Cabeza – 3:44
8. Always On My Mind – 3:28
9. Away From the Roll of the Sea – 4:09
10. Any Place I Hang My Hat Is Home – 4:46
11. All the Things You Are/Hymne a L'amour – 4:46
12. Fly Away – 3:36

With a Little Help from My Friends - Single
Broadway Records (Single: March 2017, ASIN: B06XQ7GHYC)

1. With A Little Help From My Friends – 4:43

Anna Christie: World Premiere Recording
Broadway Records (CD: August 16, 2019, ASIN: B07TNVX4RT)

Disc: 1

1. Act 1, Scene 1: Prelude
2. Act 1, Scene 1: Inside Larry's Bar, Chris and Larry
3. Act 1, Scene 1: Marthy Enters
4. Act 1, Scene 1: Anna Enters
5. Act 1, Scene 1: Chris Re-Awakens
6. Act 1, Scene 1: Anna and Chris Meet
7. Act 1, Scene 1: Orchestral Interlude
8. Act 1, Scene 2: Anna and Chris on His Barge
9. Act 1, Scene 2: Orchestral Interlude
10. Act 1, Scene 2: Mat Enters
11. Act 1, Scene 2: Anna and Mat Alone
12. Act 1, Scene 2: Chris Re-Enters

Disc: 2

1. Act 2, Scene 1: The Cabin on Chris's Barge; Chris and Anna
2. Act 2, Scene 1: Mat and Chris
3. Act 2, Scene 1: Anna Enters
4. Act 2, Scene 1: Orchestral Interlude
5. Act 2, Scene 2: On the Deck of the Barge, Anna and Chris
6. Act 2, Scene 2: Mat Returns
