= Impossible Dream (Aaron Lazar album) =

Studio album by Aaron Lazar
- Released: August 23, 2024
- Recorded: 2024
- Studio: East West, Power Station, Luminous, Timberlake, Big Orange Sheep
- Length: 40:45
- Label: Lexicon Classics
- Producer: Kitt Wakeley, Jonathan Estabrooks, Aaron Lazar, David Das, Patrick Conlon, Christina Giacona

Impossible Dream is a studio album by American actor and singer Aaron Lazar and includes duets with artists such as Josh Groban, Neil Patrick Harris, Leslie Odom Jr, and Loren Allred, among others. It was released on August 23, 2024, by Studio Seven Media and charted at #2 on Billboard's Classical Crossover Album chart in September, 2024. The album was nominated for a Grammy Award for "Best Traditional Pop Vocal Album" in November, 2024.

== History ==
On August 23, 2024 Aaron Lazar, recently diagnosed with ALS, released the album "Impossible Dream," produced by Kitt Wakeley, Jonathan Estabrooks, Aaron Lazar, David Das, Patrick Conlon and Christina Giacona. Record sales proceeds will benefit the ALS Network. Broadway singers and actors Josh Groban, Kelli O’Hara, Leslie Odom, Jr., Neil Patrick Harris, Kate Baldwin, Norm Lewis, and Loren Allred sing duets with Lazar and the title track features singers Sting, Lin-Manuel Miranda, and Kristin Chenoweth, among others. It was developed by Studio Seven Media and Emitha LLC

"Let Your Soul Be the Pilot", the album's first single release, won an HIMA Award for "Best Adult Contemporary Song" and the album charted at #2 on Billboard's Classical Crossover Albums chart.

The title track, "Impossible Dream", features singers Sting, Lin-Manuel Miranda, Kristin Chenoweth, Liz Callaway, Brian Stokes Mitchell, Shoshana Bean, Joanna Gleason, Brian d'Arcy James and Adrienne Warren. Also featured on the track are Shoshana Bean, Christy Altomare, Christiane Noll, Adam Jacobs, Mike Love, Betsy Wolfe, Marc Kudisch, Max von Essen, Tony Yazbeck, Jessica Phillips, Jill Paice, Mike Minarik Anthony Fedorov, Aaron Gleason, Ali Louis Bourzgui, Chris Sarandon, Corey Cott, Elena Shaddow, Erin Davie, Graham Rowat, Jon Armour, Mia Moravis, Michael Berresse, Phillip James Griffith, Kris Angelis, Nicole Zuraitis, Emily Drennan, Vivian Fang Liu, Radhika Vekaria, Dele Olasiji, Sangeeta Kaur, Matt B, Anita Lerche, Zak Resnick, Reese Levine, Sarah Duvall, Courtney Reed, Dan Cooney, Travis Leland, David Coolidge, Matty Miller, Gianee Martinez, and Fiona O'Brien.

== Track listing ==
Impossible Dream
No.	Title	Writer(s)	Producer(s)	Length
1.	"I'd Give It All for You" (duet with Kate Baldwin)	Jason Robert Brown	Kitt Wakeley, Jonathan Estabrooks, Aaron Lazar, David Das, Patrick Conlon, Christina Giacona	5:15
2.	"When You Believe" (duet with Norm Lewis)	Stephen Schwartz	Kitt Wakeley, Jonathan Estabrooks, Aaron Lazar, David Das, Patrick Conlon, Christina Giacona	3:28
3.	"I Am Loved" (duet with Rebecca Luker)	Cole Porter	Kitt Wakeley, Jonathan Estabrooks, Aaron Lazar, David Das, Patrick Conlon, Christina Giacona	4:04
4.	"Get Happy/Happy Days Are Here Again" (duet with Leslie Odom Jr.)	Milton Ager; Harold Arlen	Kitt Wakeley, Jonathan Estabrooks, Aaron Lazar, David Das, Patrick Conlon, Christina Giacona	3:42
5.	"Make Our Garden Grow" (duet with Kelli O'Hara)	Leonard Bernstein	Kitt Wakeley, Jonathan Estabrooks, Aaron Lazar, David Das, Patrick Conlon, Christina Giacona	4:20
6.	"Fight the Dragons" (duet with Neil Patrick Harris)	Andrew Lippa	Kitt Wakeley, Jonathan Estabrooks, Aaron Lazar, David Das, Patrick Conlon, Christina Giacona	5:01
7.	"You'll Never Walk Alone" (duet with Loren Allred)	Rodgers and Hammerstein	Kitt Wakeley, Jonathan Estabrooks, Aaron Lazar, David Das, Patrick Conlon, Christina Giacona	4:19
8.	"Let Your Soul Be Your Pilot" (duet with Josh Groban)	Sting	Kitt Wakeley, Jonathan Estabrooks, Aaron Lazar, David Das, Patrick Conlon, Christina Giacona	4:58
9.	"The Impossible Dream"	Joe Darion; Mitch Leigh	Kitt Wakeley, Jonathan Estabrooks, Aaron Lazar, David Das, Patrick Conlon, Christina Giacona	6:00
Total length:				40:45

== Personnel ==
=== Musicians ===
- Piano - Joe Block, Sterling Cozza, David Das, Jack Johnson, Brian Piper, Jordan Seigel
- Guitar - Mitch Bell, Russ Hewitt, Terry Wollman
- Bass - Rei Wang Bowen, Sam Weber, Young Heo, Christian Fabian
- Drums - Kenny Aronoff, David Bowen, Nik Hughes, Sean McCurley, Jay Sawyer
- Percussionist - MB Gordy
- Harp - Kirsten Agresta-Copely
- Orchestra - Onyx Lane Chamber Orchestra
- Choirs - National Children's Chorus, Broadway Inspirational Voices
- Choral conductor - Sydney Anderson
- Arrangers - Larry Blank, Jason Robert Brown, David Das, Pattie Dreenan, Joseph Kreines, Andrew Lippa, Chris Prather, Jordan Seigel, Kitt Wakeley, Joe Block, Bryan Carter

=== Technical ===
- Producers - Kitt Wakeley, Jonathan Estabrooks, Aaron Lazar, Patrick Conlon, David Das, Christina Giacona
- Associate producers - Gillian Riesen, John Riesen, Sydney Anderson
- Vocal producer - Sydney Anderson (tracks 6, 9)
- Recording engineers - David Reitzas, Brian Vibberts, Tre Nagella, Patrick Conlon, Christina Giacona
- Mixing engineer - Tre Nagella
- Mastering engineer - Kevin Lively
- Recording studio - East West, Power Station, Luminous, Timberlake, Big Orange Sheep
- Mixing studio - Luminous Studios - Dallas, Texas
- Mastering studio - Lively Mastering - Oklahoma City, Oklahoma
- Immersive Mixing Engineer - Brad Smalling, Athena Wilkinson
- Immersive Mastering Engineer - Brad Smalling

== Charts ==
Chart performance for Impossible Dream
Chart (2024)	Peak Position
US (Billboard)	2

== Awards ==
Year	Nominated work	Category	Award	Result
2024	Impossible Dream	Best Traditional Pop Vocal Album	Grammy Award	Nominated
2024	Let Your Soul Be Your Pilot	Best Production/Producer	Hollywood Independent Music Awards	Won
2024	Let Your Soul Be Your Pilot	Best Music Production/Producer	Josie Music Award	Nominated
