= Karen Holvik =

American opera singer

Karen Holvik (born May 20, 1952) is an American classical soprano and voice teacher.

== Life and career ==
Holvik was born in Cedar Falls, Iowa, the daughter of Karl Holvik (1921–2003), clarinetist, conductor, and Professor of Music at the University of Northern Iowa from 1947 to 1984, and Martha Holvik (1920–2014), violinist, violist, pianist and soprano, who also taught at UNI and founded the UNI Suzuki School in 1976. She gained a master's degree and Performer's Certificate in Opera at the Eastman School of Music, and settled in New York City. She appeared with Western Opera Theater, Texas Opera Theater, Houston Grand Opera, Opera Illinois, Opera Festival of New Jersey, and Anchorage Opera. Her operatic roles include Susanna, Constanze, Sandrina, Adina, Lucia, Juliette, Micaela, Miss Wordsworth, Tytania and Baby Doe. She has toured extensively in the United States, Western Europe and Canada, singing both popular and classical repertoire.

Among the vocal competitions in which she participated were the Oratorio Society of New York, the Liederkranz Foundation, the American Opera Auditions, and Joy in Singing, which sponsored her debut recital in Alice Tully Hall. Her debut at Avery Fisher Hall in the Richard Tucker Gala Concert was recorded by RCA Victor Red Seal, and she made her Carnegie Hall debut singing Handel's Messiah with the Masterwork Chorus and Orchestra, David Briskin, conductor.

A champion of contemporary American song and opera, she has premiered works by Ricky Ian Gordon, Aaron Kernis, John Musto, James Sellars, Tom Cipullo, Stewart Wallace and Richard Wilson. She appears with William Sharp and pianist Steven Blier on a New York Festival of Song recording released by Koch International Classics called Zipperfly & Other Songs by Marc Blitzstein.

Holvik began her teaching career at the University of Missouri, and subsequently taught at Vassar College, New York University and the Eastman School of Music. As of 2016 she is chair of the voice faculty at the New England Conservatory.

Holvik attended the Music Academy of the West summer conservatory program in 1985.

== Partial discography ==
- A Salute to American Music (Richard Tucker Music Foundation Gala XVI, 1991)
