= A Salute to American Music =

- RCA Victor Red Seal CD, 09026-61508-2

Live album by James Conlon
- Released: 1992
- Studio: Avery Fisher Hall, New York
- Genre: Classical and popular
- Length: 113:06
- Language: English
- Label: RCA Victor Red Seal
- Producer: John Pfeiffer

A Salute to American Music is a 113-minute live album of music, both classical and popular, performed by Steven Blier, Renée Fleming, Paul Groves, Jerry Hadley, Karen Holvik, Marilyn Horne, Jeff Mattsey, Robert Merrill, Sherrill Milnes, Maureen O'Flynn, Phyllis Pancella, Leontyne Price, Samuel Ramey, Daniel Smith, Frederica von Stade, Tatiana Troyanos, Carol Vaness and Denise Woods with the Collegiate Chorale and members of the Metropolitan Opera Orchestra under the direction of James Conlon. The album was released in 1992.

== Background ==
The album was recorded at the sixteenth annual gala of the Richard Tucker Music Foundation, a charity which supports American opera singers in their training and in beginning their careers. (The Foundation was set up in memory of Richard Tucker (1913-1975), an American operatic tenor, by his widow, children, friends and colleagues.) The gala was televised in the United States by PBS.

== Recording ==
The album was digitally recorded at a live performance on 10 November 1991 in the Avery Fisher Hall, New York City.

== Packaging ==
The cover of the album, designed under the art direction of J. J. Stelmach, features Flag (1954-1955) by Jasper Johns, a 42 1/4-by-60 5/8-inch (1,070 mm × 1,540 mm) encaustic painting made of oil and collage on fabric mounted on plywood. The painting is in the Museum of Modern Art, New York City, to which it was given by Philip Johnson in honour of Alfred H. Barr, Jr.

== Critical reception ==
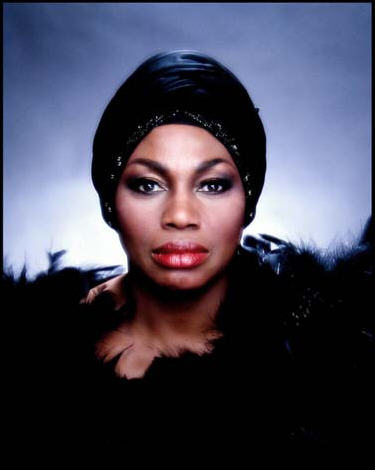
Leontyne Price photographed by Jack Mitchell in 1994

Peter Dickinson reviewed a disc of excerpts from the album in Gramophone in June 1993. The Richard Tucker Music Foundation's sixteenth gala was, he wrote, in the words of its conductor, "a look at an era just gone by". It was launched by one of its most senior contributors, Leontyne Price, with a Broadway-style arrangement of "America the Beautiful". (Oddly, the CD's insert booklet denied the hymnodist Samuel Augustus Ward his due credit as the song's composer.) Even "at the age of 63, she [could] still summon enough patriotic fervour to make non-Americans want to apply for citizenship papers on the spot".

Kurt Weill made the first of his two appearances on the record in the "ecstatic virtuosity" of the Ice Cream Sextet from Street Scene, a work which had lately become more salient after a staging at the English National Opera and the release of cast albums by Decca and TER. The composer was not quite as well served by the 74-year-old Robert Merrill, who sang "touchingly" in "September Song" from Knickerbocker Glory but who was infuriatingly out of synchrony with James Conlon's orchestra.

A single poem by William Blake, curiously, featured in the gala twice. His famous Tiger burned bright both in a song from Virgil Thomson's 1951 Five Songs from William Blake - one of two settings of Blake's text that Thomson had composed - and in William Bolcom's "The Tyger". It was Bolcom's version that was greeted more warmly, "bringing the house down" with an array of percussion instruments revelling behind chanting choristers.

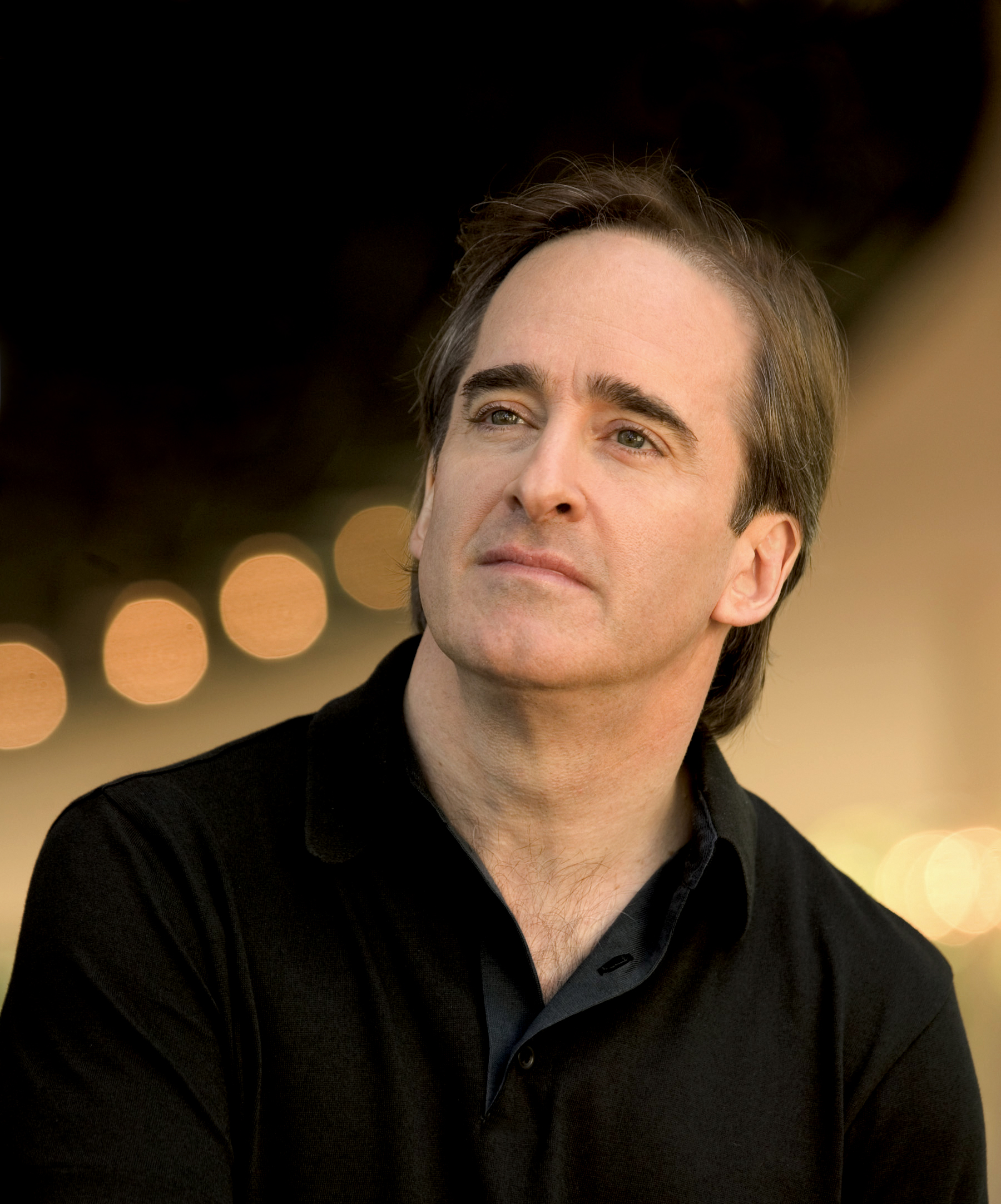
James Conlon

Profounder depths of feeling were plumbed by Samuel Barber and Stephen Foster. The "polished nostalgia" of "Must the winter come so soon?" from Barber's Vanessa might be somewhat "calculating", but it was sung "hauntingly" by Frederica von Stade. Carol Vaness sang "Give me my robe" from Barber's Antony and Cleopatra with "equal poignancy". And Stephen Foster's "Ah, may the red rose live always" received one of the concert's most affecting performances from Karen Holvik, accompanied simply by Steven Blier's piano.

Leonard Bernstein was the one composer given the accolade of being heard in three different compositions. The ensemble "Make our garden grow" represented Candide, one of his Chichester Psalms was sung by an "on form" Collegiate Chorale and Jerry Hadley sang "Maria" from West Side Story in a voice that went "a bit over the top intonationally" at the peak of its erotic rhapsodizing. And two of America's other great mezzo-sopranos followed in the wake of von Stade. Tatiana Troyanos performed Robert Lowry's "At the River", in its arrangement by Aaron Copland, with "impressive, quiet dignity". And "finally, in case you didn't sign on for US citizenship, Marilyn Horne [gave] a truly commanding performance" of Irving Berlin's ageless "God Bless America". All in all, Dickinson concluded, it was not enough merely to say that the gala, recorded before "an enthusiastic audience", was a success. "It's a wow!"

The album was also reviewed in Classic CD and in Fanfare.

== Track listing, CD1 ==
- 1 (0:18) Introduction

Samuel A. Ward (1848-1903)

- 2 (3:23) "America the Beautiful" (music: 1883, lyrics by Katherine Lee Bates: 1895); Leontyne Price
- 3 (0:50) Gala introduction
- 4 (1:15) Introduction

Gian Carlo Menotti (1911-2007)

- 5 (4:25) Amelia Goes to the Ball (1936, libretto by Menotti): Overture
- 6 (1:04) Introduction

Kurt Weill (1900-1950)

- 7 (4:48) Street Scene (1946, lyrics by Langston Hughes, book by Elmer Rice): "Ice Cream Sextet"; Maureen O'Flynn, Phyllis Pancella, Jerry Hadley, Paul Groves, Daniel Smith and Jeff Mattsey
- 8 (1:01) Introduction

Virgil Thomson (1896-1989)

- 9 (2:33) Five Songs from William Blake (1951): "Tiger, tiger"; Sherrill Milnes

Charles T. Griffes (1884-1920)

- 10 (3:41) Three Poems of Fiona MacLeod (1918): "The Lament of Ian the Proud"; Renée Fleming
- 11 (0:29) Introduction

Stephen Foster (1826-1864)

- 12 (4:42) "Ah, may the red rose live always"; Karen Holvik

Leonard Bernstein (1918-1990)

- 13 (3:24) Chichester Psalms (1965): Part One; Chorus
- 14 (1:23) Introduction

Aaron Copland (1900-1990)

- 15 (3:03) "At the River"; Tatiana Troyanos
- 16 (0:33) Introduction

William Bolcom (b. 1938)

- 17 (2:02) Songs of Innocence and of Experience (1984, text by William Blake): "The Tyger"; Chorus
- 18 (0:25) Introduction

Douglas Moore (1893-1969)

- 19 (3:06) The Devil and Daniel Webster (1938): "I've got a ram, Goliath"; Sherrill Milnes
- 20 (0:29) Introduction

Marc Blitzstein (1905-1964)

- 21 (8:17) Regina (1948, libretto by Blitzstein): "Rain Quartet"; Maureen O'Flynn, Renée Fleming, Denise Woods, Samuel Ramey, Jeff Mattsey and Chorus
- 22 (1:32) Introduction

George Gershwin (1898-1937)

- 23 (4:38) Porgy and Bess (1935, libretto by DuBose Heyward and Ira Gershwin): "Leavin' for the promised land"; Denise Woods, Chorus

== Track listing, CD2 ==
Igor Stravinsky (1892-1971)

- 1 (0:40) The Rake's Progress (1951): Fanfare
- 2 (1:25) Introduction

Marvin David Levy (1932-2015)

- 3 (5:13) Mourning Becomes Electra (1967, libretto by Henry W. Butler): "Too weak to kill the man I hate"; Sherrill Milnes
- 4 (0:45) Introduction

Samuel Barber (1910-1981)

- 5 (3:04) Vanessa (1958, libretto by Gian Carlo Menotti): "Must the winter come so soon?"; Frederica von Stade
- 6 (0:35) Introduction

Carlisle Floyd (1926-2021)

- 7 (3:51) Susannah (1955, libretto by Floyd): "Hear me, O Lord (prayer of repentance)"; Samuel Ramey
- 8 (1:09) Introduction

Samuel Barber

- 9 (9:21) Antony and Cleopatra: "Give me my robe"; Carol Vaness
- 10 (0:31) Introduction

Cole Porter (1891-1964)

- 11 (4:02) Gay Divorce (1932): "Night and Day"; Samuel Ramey
- 12 (0:25) Introduction

Duke Ellington (1899-1974)

- 13 (3:34) "Prelude to a Kiss"; Renée Fleming
- 14 (0:36) Introduction

Kurt Weill

- 15 (2:27) Knickerbocker Holiday: "September Song"; Robert Merrill
- 16 (0:41) Introduction

Leonard Bernstein

- 17 (3:22) West Side Story: "Maria"; Jerry Hadley
- 18 (0:26) Introduction

Richard Rodgers (1902-1979)

- 19 (4:49) Carousel (1945, lyrics by Oscar Hammerstein II): "If I loved you"; Carol Vaness and Jeff Mattsey
- 20 (0:24) Introduction

Irving Berlin (1888-1989)

- 21 (2:26) "God Bless America" (1938, lyrics by Berlin); Marilyn Horne
- 22 (0:53) Introduction

Leonard Bernstein

- 23 (5:06) Candide (1956): "Make our garden grow": Renée Fleming, Jerry Hadley, Chorus and Company

== Personnel ==
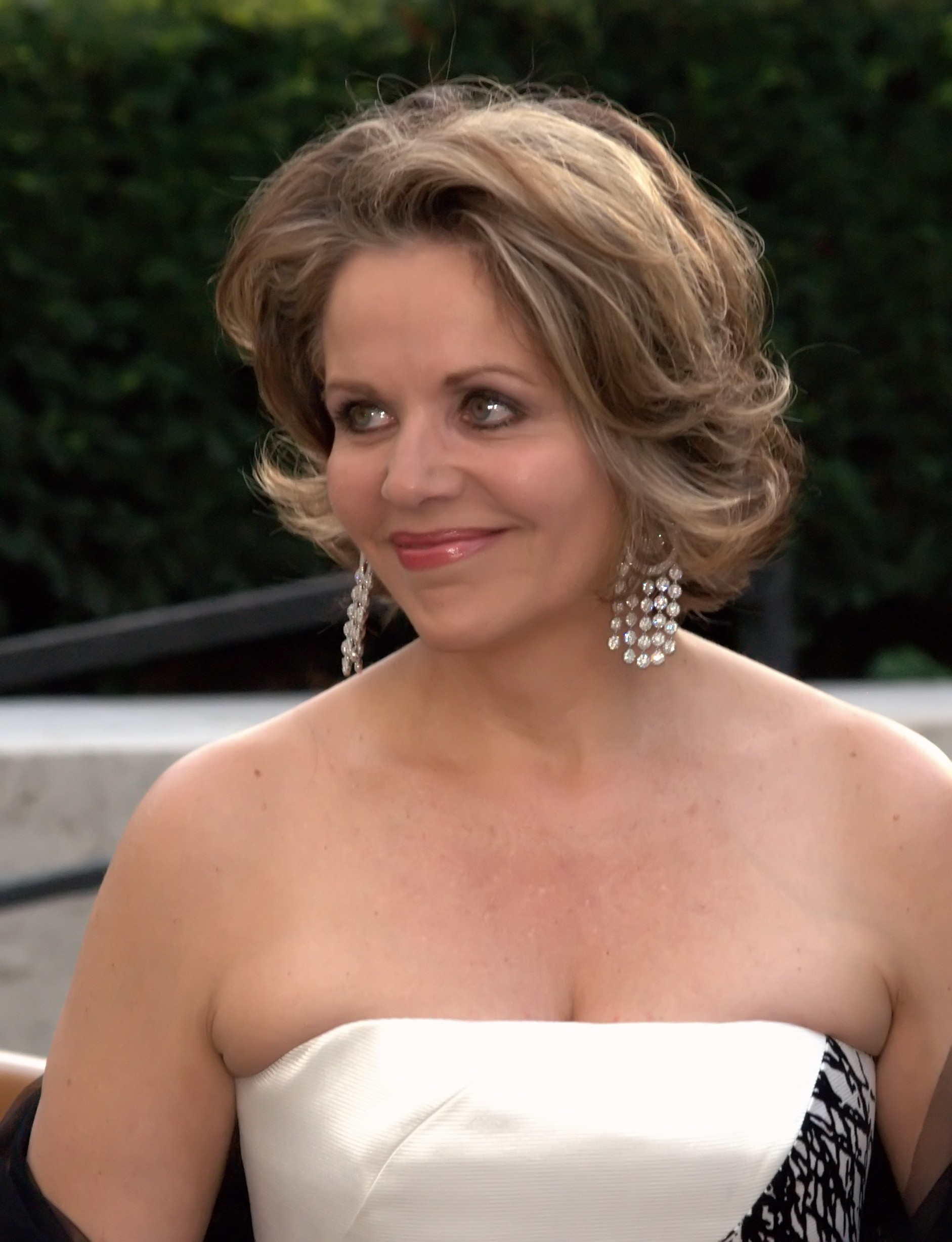
Renée Fleming photographed by David Shankbone in 2009

=== Musicians ===
- Renée Fleming, soprano
- Paul Groves, tenor
- Jerry Hadley (1952-2007), tenor
- Karen Holvik, soprano
- Marilyn Horne, mezzo-soprano
- Jeff Mattsey, baritone
- Robert Merrill (1917-2004), baritone
- Sherrill Milnes, baritone
- Maureen O'Flynn, soprano
- Phyllis Pancella, mezzo-soprano
- Leontyne Price, soprano
- Samuel Ramey, bass
- Daniel Smith, tenor
- Frederica von Stade, mezzo-soprano
- Tatiana Troyanos (1938-1993), mezzo-soprano
- Carol Vaness, soprano
- Denise Woods, soprano
- Collegiate Chorale (renamed MasterVoices in 2015)
- Members of the Metropolitan Opera Orchestra
- Robert Bass, chorus master
- Steven Blier, piano and musical consultant
- James Conlon, conductor and artistic director

=== Other ===
- John Pfeiffer (1920-1996), producer
- Matthew A. Epstein, artistic consultant
- Dave Hewitt, recording engineer
- Phil Gitomer, recording engineer
- Anthony Salvatore, editing and digital mastering
- D'Alessio Productions, technical co-ordination
- Barry Tucker, President of the Richard Tucker Foundation
- Karen Kriendler Nelson, Executive Director of the Richard Tucker Foundation

== Release history ==
In 1992, RCA Victor Red Seal issued the album on CD (catalogue number 09026-61508-2) with a 12-page insert booklet presenting an account of the Richard Tucker Music Foundation, notes on the concert by James Conlon and photographs of Tucker, Conlon, Hadley. Horne. Merrill, Milnes, Price, Ramey, von Stade and Vaness. The booklet did not offer texts or translations. Also in 1992, RCA Victor Red Seal issued an abridged, 72-minute version of the album (catalogue number 09026-61509-2) that omitted the 2-CD version's introductions and six of its selections - the items by Douglas Moore, Marc Blitzstein, Igor Stravinsky, Cole Porter, Duke Ellington and Richard Rodgers. The excerpts disc was accompanied by an 8-page booklet that provided the same notes and photographs as the other insert with the exception of its photograph of Conlon.
