= Blier =

Blier is a surname, which stemmed from the French name Belier. The term is symbolic with powerful, forceful person, from bélier ‘ram’, ‘battering ram’ Notable people with the surname include:

- Bernard Blier (1916–1989), French actor
- Bertrand Blier (1939–2025), French screenwriter and film director
- Mark Blier, American politician
- Steven Blier (born 1951), American pianist
- Suzanne Blier (born 1948), American art historian
