= Arias and Barcarolles =

- Deutsche Grammophon CD, 439 926-2

Studio album by Michael Tilson Thomas
- Released: 1996
- Studio: Henry Wood Hall, London
- Genre: Contemporary classical
- Length: 78:21
- Language: English and Yiddish
- Label: Deutsche Grammophon
- Producer: Christian Gansch

Arias and Barcarolles is a 78-minute contemporary classical studio album of music by Leonard Bernstein, performed by Thomas Hampson, Frederica von Stade, Simon Carrington, Neil Percy and the London Symphony Orchestra under the direction of Michael Tilson Thomas. In addition to the song cycle which gives it its name, the album includes the Suite from Bernstein's opera A Quiet Place and the Symphonic Dances from his musical West Side Story. It was released in 1996.

== Background ==
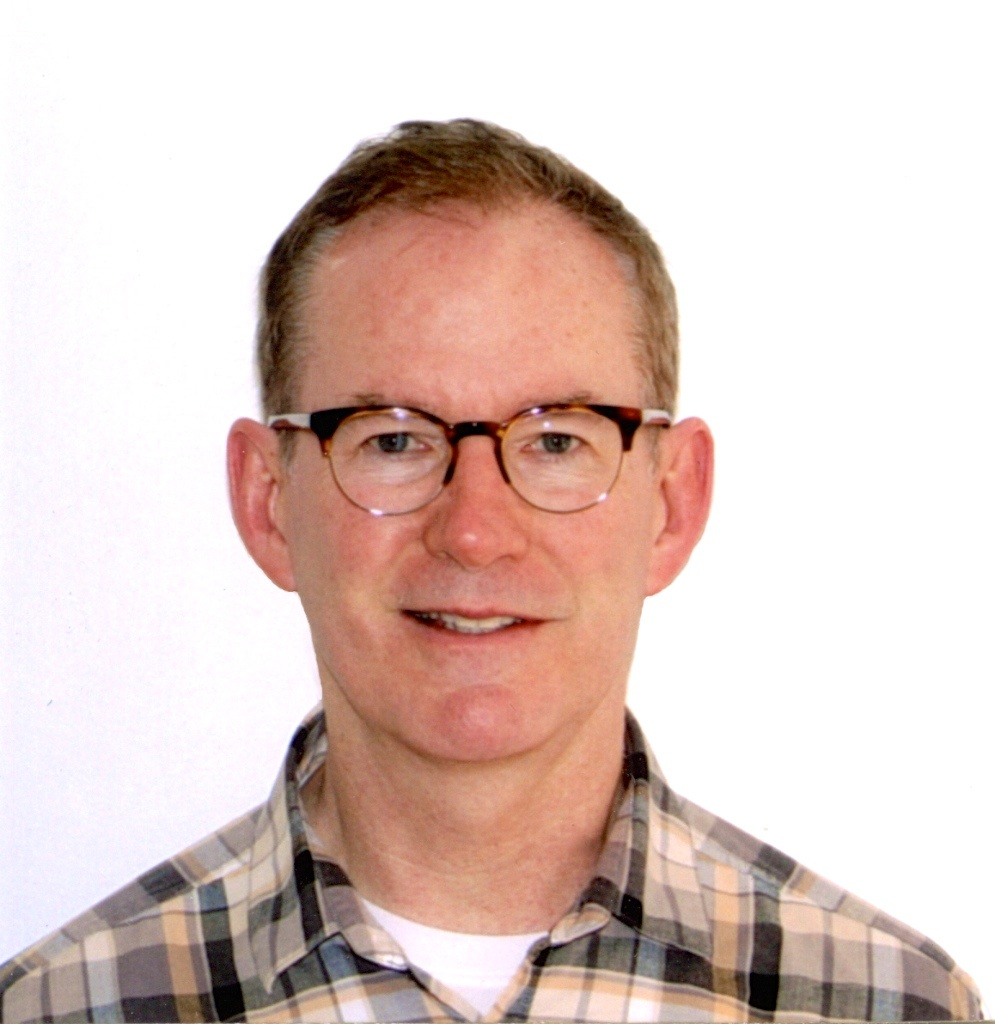
Orchestrator Bruce Coughlin

Arias and Barcarolles exists in four versions. The first version is scored for four singers and piano duet, and was first performed in May 1988 in New York City by Joyce Castle, Louise Edeiken, John Brandstetter, Mordechai Kaston, Leonard Bernstein and Michael Tilson Thomas. The second version is scored for two singers and piano duet, and was first performed on April 22, 1989, in the Recanati Hall of the Tel Aviv Museum of Art by Amalia Ishak, Raphael Frieder, Irit Rub-Levy and Ariel Cohen. This version was recorded by Judy Kaye, William Sharp, Michael Barrett and Steven Blier and released on CD in 1990 by Koch International Classics (catalogue number 37000-2). The third version, orchestrated by Bright Sheng, is scored for two singers, strings and percussion, and was first performed in September 1989 in New York City by Susan Graham, Kurt Ollmann and the New York Chamber Symphony of the 92nd Street Y under the direction of Gerard Schwarz. This version was recorded by Jane Bunnell, Dale Duesing and the Seattle Symphony under Schwarz and released on CD in 1990 by Delos (catalogue number DE 3078). The fourth version, orchestrated by Bruce Coughlin, is scored for two singers and a full orchestra, and was first performed in September 1993 in the Barbican Hall, London by the soloists, orchestra and conductor of the present album. In 2018, SFS Media released a new recording of Coughlin's version, performed by Isabel Leonard, Ryan McKinny and the San Francisco Symphony under Tilson Thomas's direction.

The name of the song cycle was inspired by a remark of President Dwight D. Eisenhower's. Thanking Bernstein after a concert of music by Mozart and Gershwin that his guest had conducted at the White House on April 5, 1960, the President said "I like that last piece you played. It's got a theme. I like music with a theme, not all them arias and barcarolles".

== Recording ==
The album was digitally recorded in September 1993 in the Henry Wood Hall, London.

== Packaging ==
The cover of the album was designed under the art direction of Fred Münzmaier, and features a photograph of Bernstein taken by Don Hunstein.

== Critical reception ==
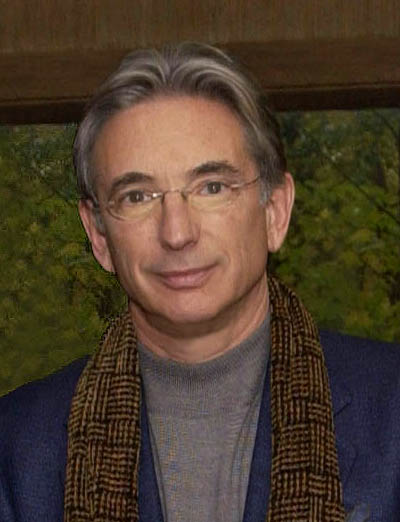
Conductor Michael Tilson Thomas in 2008

Edward Seckerson reviewed the album in Gramophone in November 1996. Among the many playful allusions in Arias and Barcarolles, he wrote, was one to Johannes Brahms's Liebeslieder Walzer, and it was this particular witticism that was key to understanding the essence of Bernstein's song cycle. Half public, half private, half formal, half informal, it was written to be performed for a small, invited audience in a domestic setting, and it was conceived for the "time-honoured intimacy" of voice and piano. To orchestrate it was to violate it. Bruce Coughlin's version "takes the piece somewhere else, it distracts from, pulls focus from, the ingenuity and intrigue of the word-play, it over-paints the musical allusions, shifts the emphasis from implicit to explicit." Thus Bernstein's hint of Straussian romanticism in "Little Smary" was inflated into a passage that could have come straight from the pages of Der Rosenkavalier. "The Wedding" became overtly Mahlerian. "Mr and Mrs Webb Say Goodnight" was invaded by a blatant Shostakovich march. "Greeting" – a setting of a poem that Bernstein had written to celebrate the birth of one of his children – was made less affecting, not more, by a commentary from strings and woodwinds. And in the cycle's concluding "Nachspiel", "a slow waltz, sweet and indelible and so very personal, the hummed descant like a shared confidence", the orchestra seemed wholly intrusive. It had to be admitted, though, that Thomas Hampson and Frederica von Stade were "attention grabbing". They "don't miss a trick. Individually, and as sparring partners, they come on a treat".

The Suite from A Quiet Place was an altogether more successful feat of reimagining. Michael Tilson Thomas, Sid Ramin and Michael Barrett had extracted a quasi-symphony from Bernstein's opera "with uncanny sureness and sleight of hand". Their Suite's sound-world – including "oddly retrogressive bursts of twanging synthesizer" – was "echt Bernstein". A jazzy trombone solo was almost better than the aria from which it had been adapted, and it had been a clever idea to use Bernstein's Act 1 postlude to end the Suite in a kind of valedictory blessing. The London Symphony Orchestra could not have played with a surer grasp of Bernstein's idiom.

The orchestra's handling of the Symphonic Dances from West Side Story was less satisfying. They were good in the tender music of "Somewhere" or "I have a love", but disappointing in the Dances' more energetic passages. If one likened their performance to a car, it would be "a flashy vehicle all right (cool paint job, all chromium fittings), but it's driving with the handbrake on". On a good night, Maurice Murphy would deliver the mariachi trumpet break in "Mambo" in a way that would "fry the air around him", but even he had been unable to raise the temperature in the Henry Wood Hall to where it needed to be. In sum, the Suite from A Quiet Place was the only item on the album's menu that could be recommended without reservations.

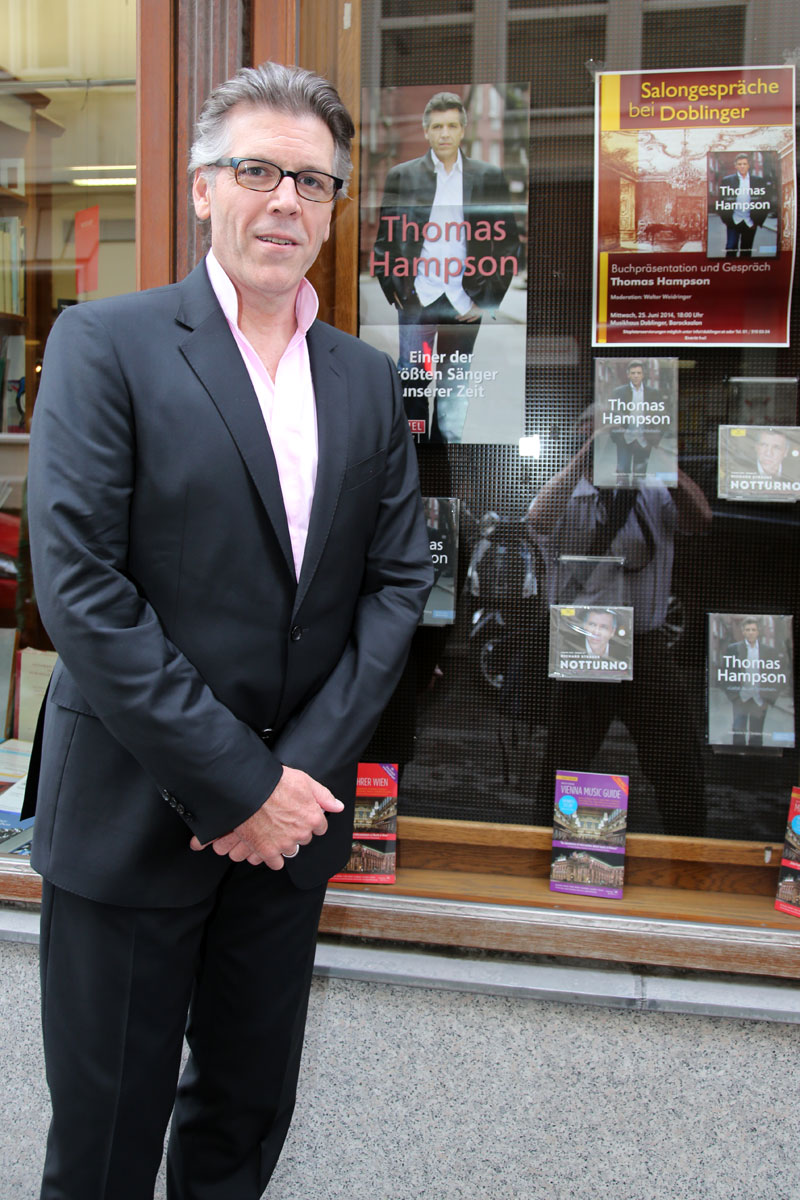
Baritone Thomas Hampson in 2014

David Gutman reviewed the album in Gramophone in December 1996. He enjoyed the Suite from A Quiet Place, and thought the Symphonic Dances from West Side Story "very good, if not the exceptional treat I was anticipating". But the album's presentation of its eponymous song cycle disappointed him. Bruce Coughlin's orchestration, he wrote, "coarsens what are merely allusions" in Bernstein's original piano-accompanied version. Bright Cheng had been more imaginative than Coughlin in borrowing "echt Bernstein effects". Indeed, it was not clear that a second orchestration of the cycle had been needed. Nor should the album's performances escape a degree of censure. Thomas Hampson and Frederica von Stade were "more opulent vocally" than their rivals on other recordings of the cycle, but also "mostly blander". The London Symphony Orchestra's playing was "by no means ideally pointed". Michael Tilson Thomas's pacing was slow from his first bar to his last, and the humour of Bernstein's musical in-jokes was not as amusing as it ought to be. Gutman considered "Arias and Barcarolles" to be one of Bernstein's most accomplished works, and he had hoped that Tilson Thomas's recording would be a great one, but it was "not really a success".

Eric Salzman reviewed the album in Stereo Review in December 1996. Arias and Barcarolles and the Suite from the poorly received A Quiet Place were among just a few works that emerged from Bernstein's old age, he wrote, a time when the composer's thoughts were governed by an "obsessive preoccupation with the trials and tribulations of family life". Like the Symphonic Dances from West Side Story, they reflected two aspects of Bernstein's complex musical personality, blending classical elements with jazz. Bruce Coughlin's orchestration of the song cycle, crafted with Bernstein looking over his shoulder, was not only effective but also fairly Bernstein-like in its flavour. Thomas Hampson and Frederica von Stade both sang their music "neatly". The stirring Suite from A Quiet Place was deservedly more popular than its source had ever been, and Michael Tilson Thomas, "a perpetual Wunderkind in the Bernstein tradition", was the ideal man to conduct it. Indeed, all three of the works on his album were presented in performances that were "serious, sincere and animated". The London Symphony Orchestra managed to sound comfortably at home in Bernstein's modern American style without sacrificing its traditional identity.

== CD track listing ==
Leonard Bernstein (1918–1990)

Arias and Barcarolles (1988), orchestrated by Bruce Coughlin

- 1 (1:37) I: Prelude (text by Leonard Bernstein), Frederica von Stade and Thomas Hampson
- 2 (4:43) II: Love Duet (text by Leonard Bernstein for JAVE), Frederica von Stade and Thomas Hampson
- 3 (2:36) III: Little Smary (text by Jennie Bernstein for SAB), Frederica von Stade
- 4 (4:50) IV: The Love of My Life (text by Leonard Bernstein to SWZ for KO), Thomas Hampson
- 5 (3:06) V: Greeting (text by Leonard Bernstein for JG), Frederica von Stade
- 6 (5:35) VI: Oif Mayn Khas'neh [At My Wedding] (text by Yankev-Yitskhok Segal for MTT), Thomas Hampson
- 7 (8:30) VII: Mr and Mrs Webb Say Goodnight (text by Leonard Bernstein for Mino and Lezbo), Frederica von Stade, Thomas Hampson, Neil Perry and Simon Carrington
- 8 (2:48) VIII: Nachspiel [Postlude], Frederica von Stade and Thomas Hampson

Suite from A Quiet Place (1983), arranged by Sid Ramin (1919–2019) and Michael Tilson Thomas with the assistance of Michael Barrett

- 9 (2:37) Prologue
- 10 (4:45) Sam's Aria
- 11 (5:02) Trio
- 12 (3:12) Jazz Trio ("Mornin' Sun")
- 13 (1:44) Chorale
- 14 (4:47) Postlude to Act I

Symphonic Dances from West Side Story (1957), orchestrated by Sid Ramin and Irwin Kostal (1911–1994) under the supervision of Leonard Bernstein

- 15 (3:52) Prologue – Allegro moderato
- 16 (4:09) "Somewhere" – Adagio
- 17 (1:16) Scherzo – Vivace leggiero
- 18 (2:15) Mambo – Presto
- 19 (0:50) Cha-Cha – Andantino con grazia
- 20 (1:31) Meeting Scene – Meno mosso
- 21 (2:48) "Cool": Fugue – Allegretto
- 22 (2:03) Rumble – Molto allegro
- 23 (3:26) Finale – Adagio

== Personnel ==
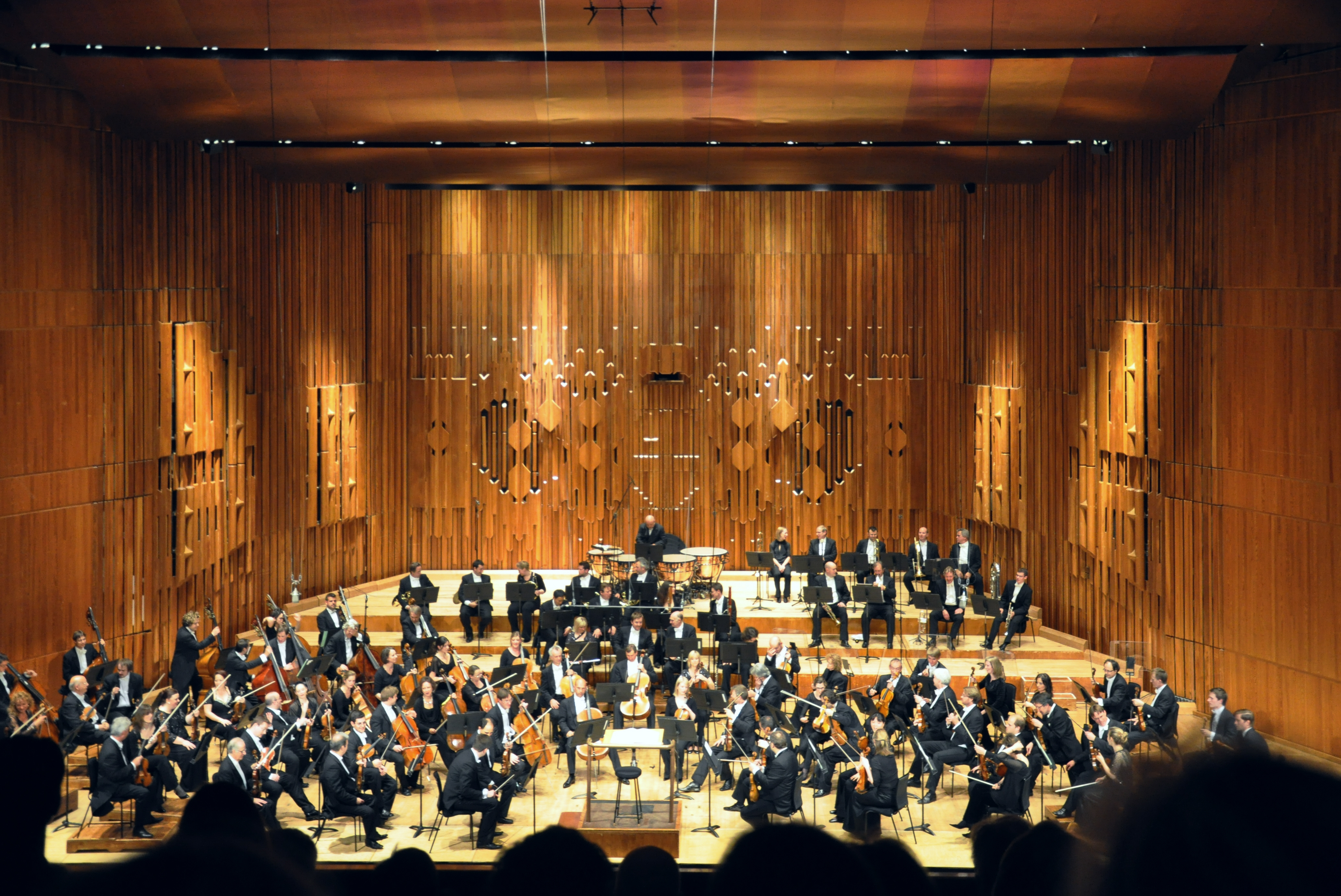
The London Symphony Orchestra at home in the Barbican Hall

=== Musical ===
- Frederica von Stade, mezzo-soprano
- Thomas Hampson. baritone
- Neil Percy, voice
- Simon Carrington, voice
- London Symphony Orchestra
- Michael Tilson Thomas, conductor

=== Other ===
- Alison Ames, executive producer
- Pål Christian Moe, associate producer
- Christian Gansch, recording producer
- Gregor Zielinsky, balance engineer
- Jobst Eberhardt, recording engineer
- Klaus Behrens, recording engineer
- Stephan Flock, editor

== Release history ==
In 1996, Deutsche Grammophon released the album on CD (catalogue number 439 926-2) with a 48-page insert booklet providing texts in the original English and Yiddish and in French and German translations. The booklet also included photographs of von Stade, Hampson, Tilson Thomas and Bernstein and notes by Michael Barrett and Steven Blier in English, French, German and Italian.
