= John Riesen =

American singer (born 1990)

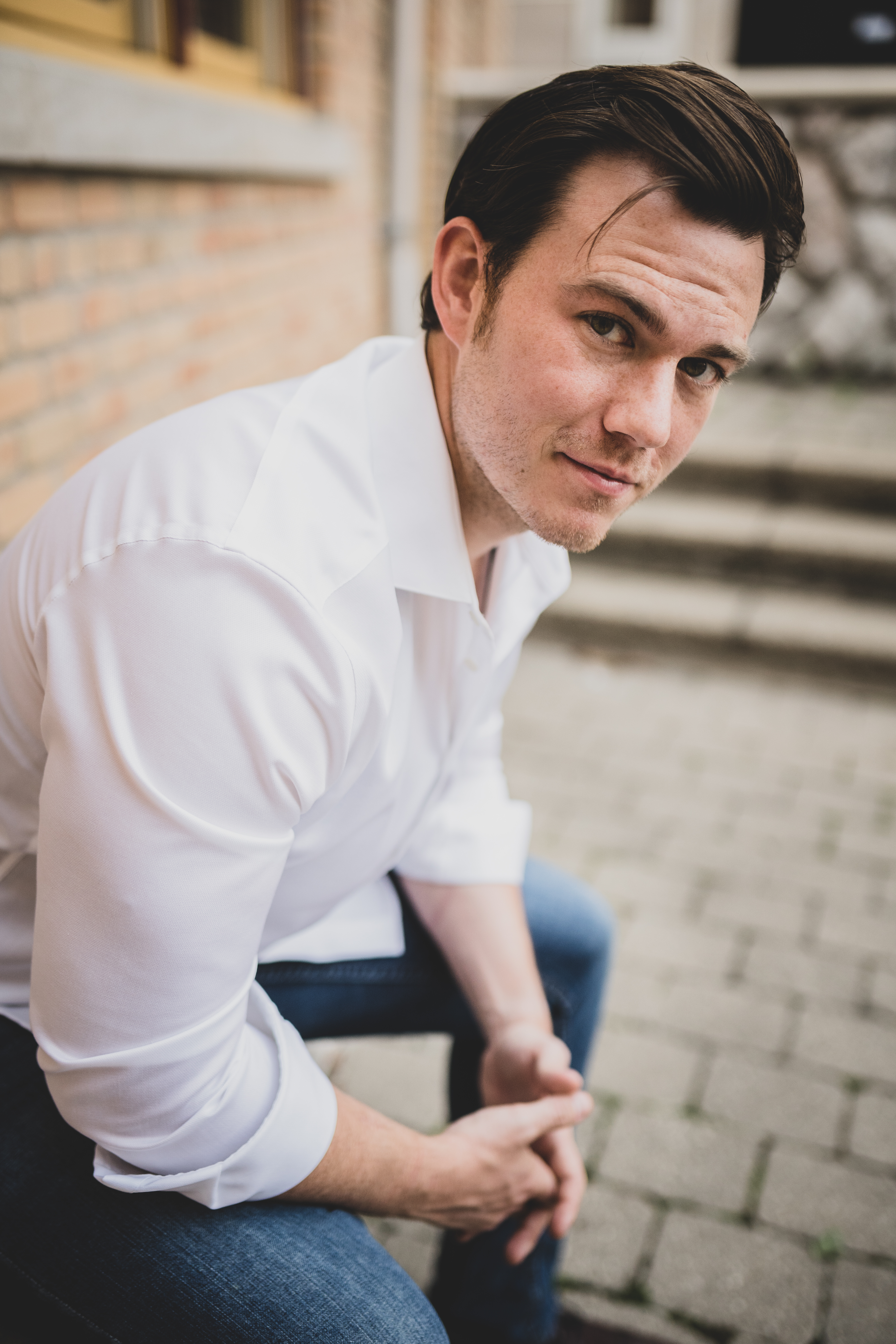
- Riesen in 2020

Background information
- Born: John Riesen; May 29, 1990 (age 36); Ilion, New York, U.S.
- Genres: Classical; classical; crossover; musical theatre; opera; jazz vocal
- Occupations: Singer; actor; performer; musician
- Instruments: Vocals; piano
- Years active: 2014–present
- Label: Blue Griffin Records
- Formerly of: Metaphysic
- Spouse: Gillian Riesen (m. 2017)
- Website: johnriesen.com

John Riesen (born 29 May 1990) is an American singer, actor, and musician best known for his performances as a tenor in musical theater, opera, and concerts. He was a semifinalist on America's Got Talent, has played lead roles in musical productions at Lincoln Center, and Segerstrom Center for the Arts, and performed in concert at Carnegie Hall.

Riesen was an associate producer on Aaron Lazar's Impossible Dream album released in 2024. The record was nominated for a Grammy Award and charted at #2 on Billboard's Classical Crossover Album chart in 2024. In 2026, Riesen and Ian Gindes released the album "Letters From the Front," (produced by Patrick Zimmerli), which received favorable reviews.

== Early life and education ==
John Riesen grew up in the Detroit area of Michigan. He was an avid baseball player (pitcher) and was awarded All-Region and All-State Academic honors. He began singing as a teenager and majored in voice performance and opera at Michigan State University where he received his Bachelor's and Master's Degrees.

== Career ==
Riesen is a singer (tenor), actor, and musician (piano). In high school he excelled in sports as a baseball pitcher then began pursuing a career in opera and musical theatre. He has performed with Marcus Hummon and Marina Arsenijevic and released two studio albums, What You’d Call a Dream (2019) and Christmas at Home (2020).

In 2013, Riesen won 1st place "Tenor" and "Audience Favorite" at the Harold Haugh Opera Vocal Competition as well as being awarded a "Jackson Symphony Contract Winner". In that same year, playing Frederic, he sang, "When You Had Left our Pirate Fold (A Paradox)", from the Pirates of Penzance, at Ruth Bader Ginsburg's speech on how the "law plays a palpable role in opera." In 2014, he won the "Apprentice Award" by the Chautauqua Opera. In 2022, he sang, the "American Anthem" at the Patriot Gala Awards ceremony for Medal of Honor recipients, hosted by Gary Sinise in Knoxville, Tennessee.

Riesen has played lead roles in such musicals as Sweeney Todd, West Side Story, Glory Denied, La traviata and Beethoven's Ninth, performing with the Dallas Symphony Orchestra, New York City Ballet, and Boulder Philharmonic Orchestra, among others. He played the lead role of Tony in West Side Story Suite at Lincoln Center and was a featured tenor in Messiah, conducted by Kent Tritle, at Carnegie Hall. Riesen played a lead role as a tenor and actor in Marcus Hummon's Favorite Son, which premiered at the Nashville Opera in 2022. He is an associate producer on Aaron Lazar's 2024 album release, Impossible Dream, featuring Josh Groban, Neil Patrick Harris, Kristin Chenoweth, and Kelli O'Hara, among others.

Riesen was a semifinalist on America's Got Talent (Episode 1716). The trio (Riesen, Patrick Dailey, and Daniel Emmet) using Metaphysic AI and deepfake multimedia, sang, "Nessun dorma" from Turandot with imagery of Simon Cowell, Terry Crews and Howie Mandel singing together. Riesen performed as Mandel and they received a standing ovation from judges, Cowell, Heidi Klum, and Sofia Vergara as well as Cowell saying that it was "the best act of the series."

== Personal life ==
Riesen resides in Buffalo, New York with his wife, Gillian (née Cotter), their son, Roman, and daughter, Eleanor.
