= Paul Groves (tenor) =

American operatic tenor (born 1964)

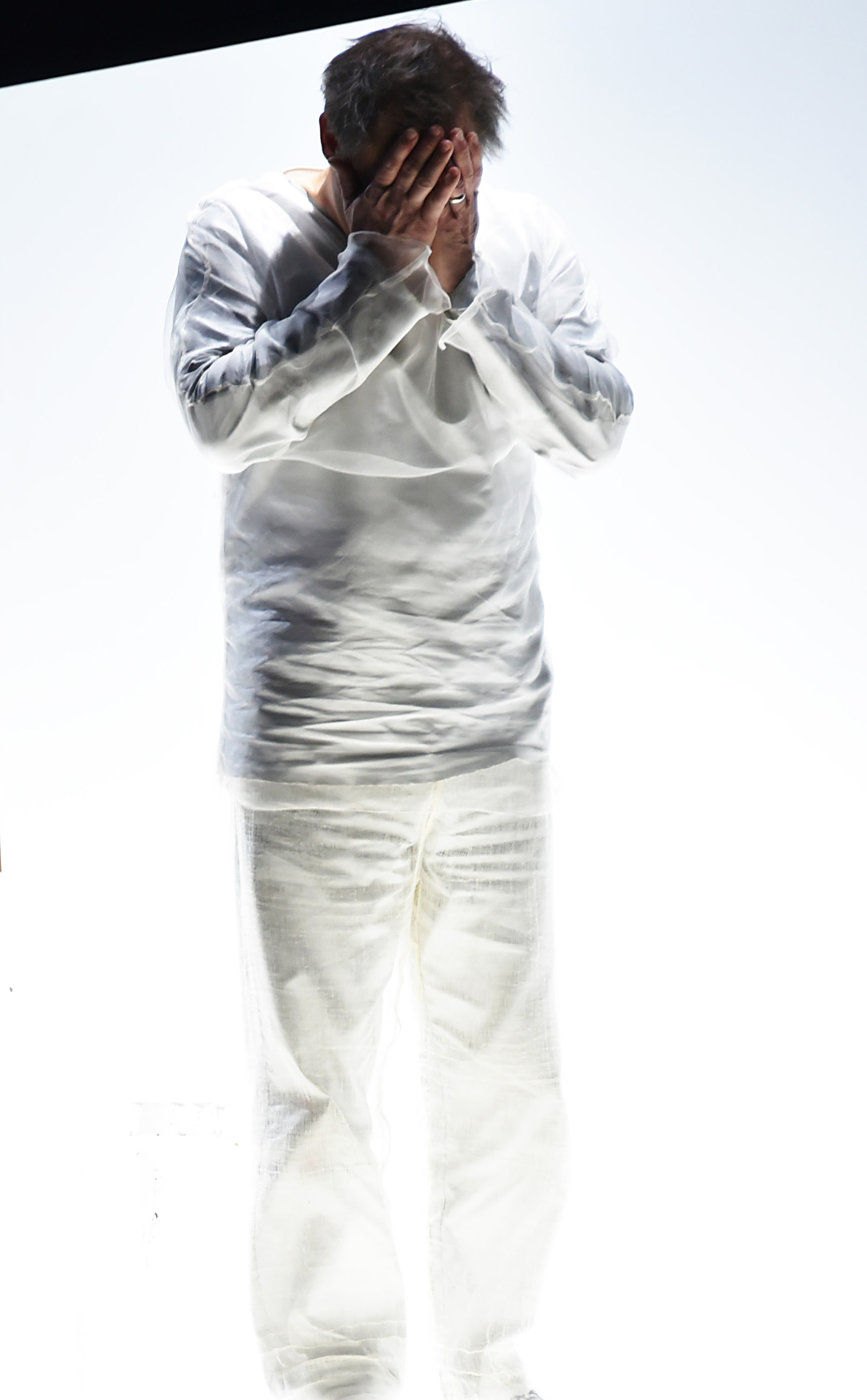

Paul Groves (born November 24, 1964, in Lake Charles, Louisiana) is an American operatic tenor. In 1991 he won the Metropolitan Opera National Council Auditions and in 1995 he won the prestigious Richard Tucker Award. He has sung leading roles with major opera houses throughout the world, including the Boston Lyric Opera, De Nederlandse Opera, La Scala, the Los Angeles Opera, the Lyric Opera of Chicago, the Metropolitan Opera, the Paris Opera, the Salzburg Festival, the San Francisco Opera, the Santa Fe Opera, the Vienna State Opera, the Washington National Opera, the Grand Theatre Genève and the Welsh National Opera among others.

== Early life and education ==
Groves graduated from the Louisiana State University School of Music.

== Discography ==
- A Salute to American Music (Richard Tucker Music Foundation Gala XVI, 1991)
- Passing By - Songs by Jake Heggie (2010)
- Mozart: The Magic Flute (Tamino) Wiener Philharmoniker, conductor: Riccardo Muti, stage director: Pierre Audi; DVD/BR Decca (2006)
