= Radhika Vekaria =

British new-age musician

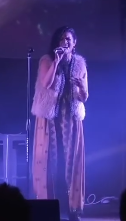

Background information
- Born: Harrow, Middlesex, UK
- Genres: World Music, New-age music
- Occupation(s): Musician, Speaker
- Instrument(s): Voice, piano, harmonium
- Website: www.radhikavekaria.com

Radhika Vekaria is a Grammy-nominated New Age vocalist, pianist, composer, songwriter and music producer.

== Early life ==
Vekaria was born in East Africa and grew up in London, UK. Vekaria desired to be an oncologist; As her life progressed, she found her vocation healer through music.

== Career ==
Vekaria has released two albums as a lead artist. In October 2020, she recorded and released her first artist album called SAPTA: The Seven Ways blending traditional mantras and devotional songs for the modern world. She released her second album Warriors of Light in 2024. Warriors of Light was nominated for the 2025 Grammy Award for Best New Age, Ambient or Chant Album. The album features collaborations with: Max ZT, MB Gordy, Kitt Wakeley, Chris Prather, Shashank Acharya, Pratik Shrivastava, Isaiah Gage, Roger Montejano, Dave Donnelly, Dennis Moody. She collaborated on the 2025 Grammy nominated Impossible Dream (Aaron Lazar album) which has reached number two on the Billboard charts.

Vekaria performed in a supporting act for two nights of Prince (musician)'s 02 tour - The Earth Tour: 21 Nights in London. Her song "I Am Not Alone" was translated into French and became part of Cléopâtre (comédie musicale), directed by Kamel Ouali at the Palais des sports de Paris performed by Dominique Magloire.

In 2009 Vekaria auditioned for the show called India India and became the lead female singer next to Ash King, and met AR Rahman. A Franco Dragone Production, the show included repertoire of songs by Rahman, Sting (musician) and Peter Gabriel, where she was directed by Brian Burke (America's Got Talent) and Justin Mabardi (Dancing with the Stars, American Idol). She sang in English, Hindi, Karnataka, Bengali language.

In 2011, Vekaria created an anthem for St. Jude's Children's Hospital called "Stand Up" sung by Shoshana Bean.

In 2021, Vekaria garnered over 100,000 listeners on the audio app Clubhouse and was the first Mantra artist to play at South by Southwest in 2022, location Wisdome 360 Immersive Dome Park in Austin, Texas. She collaborated with Jeff Koons for his Apollo Exhibition in Hydra, Greece.

In 2024, she performed at the Sages and Scientist Symposium at Harvard, with Deepak Chopra. She is the voice for Graticube - Game of Abundance - by Deepak Chopra, Terry Torok and Samuel Sokol, published by Simon and Schuster, which launched in November 2024

== Awards ==
Vekaria won three awards at the 2017 Global Peace Song Awards. These included: the jury prize for New Age Music; the public prize for Folk Music; and the Overall Grand Prize. She is the 2024 New Age InterContinental Music Awards Winner for "Best of Pangea." Vekaria's Warriors of Light was nominated for Best New Age, Ambient or chant album at the 67th Annual Grammy Awards. Her song "Liberate" was nominated for the 2025 Hollywood Independent Music Awards (HIMA) - World Category

== Discography ==
=== As leader ===
- Warriors of Light (Yaana Records, co-produced by George Landress, 2024)
- Liberate (Maha Mrityunjaya) (Yaana Records, 2024)
- Kali - Single (Yaana Records, 2023)
- Sapta: The Seven Ways - Album (Yaana Records, produced by George Landress, 2020)
- Om Namo Bhagavate - Single (Yaana Records, 2020)
- Gananam Tva (Protection) - Single (Yaana Records, 2020)

=== As guest ===
- Impossible Dream – Aaron Lazar (Studio Seven Media 2024)

== Yoga, Spirituality and Roots ==
Radhika studied meditation and yoga from a young age. She is Yoga Alliance Certified and has trained with the European Academy of Ashtanga Yoga under the tutelage of Manju Jois, the son of Sri K Pattabhi Jois. After arriving to California, Vekaria was led to the Ali Akbar Khan College of Music in San Rafael, Northern Californian and revisited Indian music training. She is also a mentor of music and spirituality at Chopra Yoga.
