= Symphonic Dances from West Side Story =

1960 suite of music by Leonard Bernstein

- by Leonard Bernstein
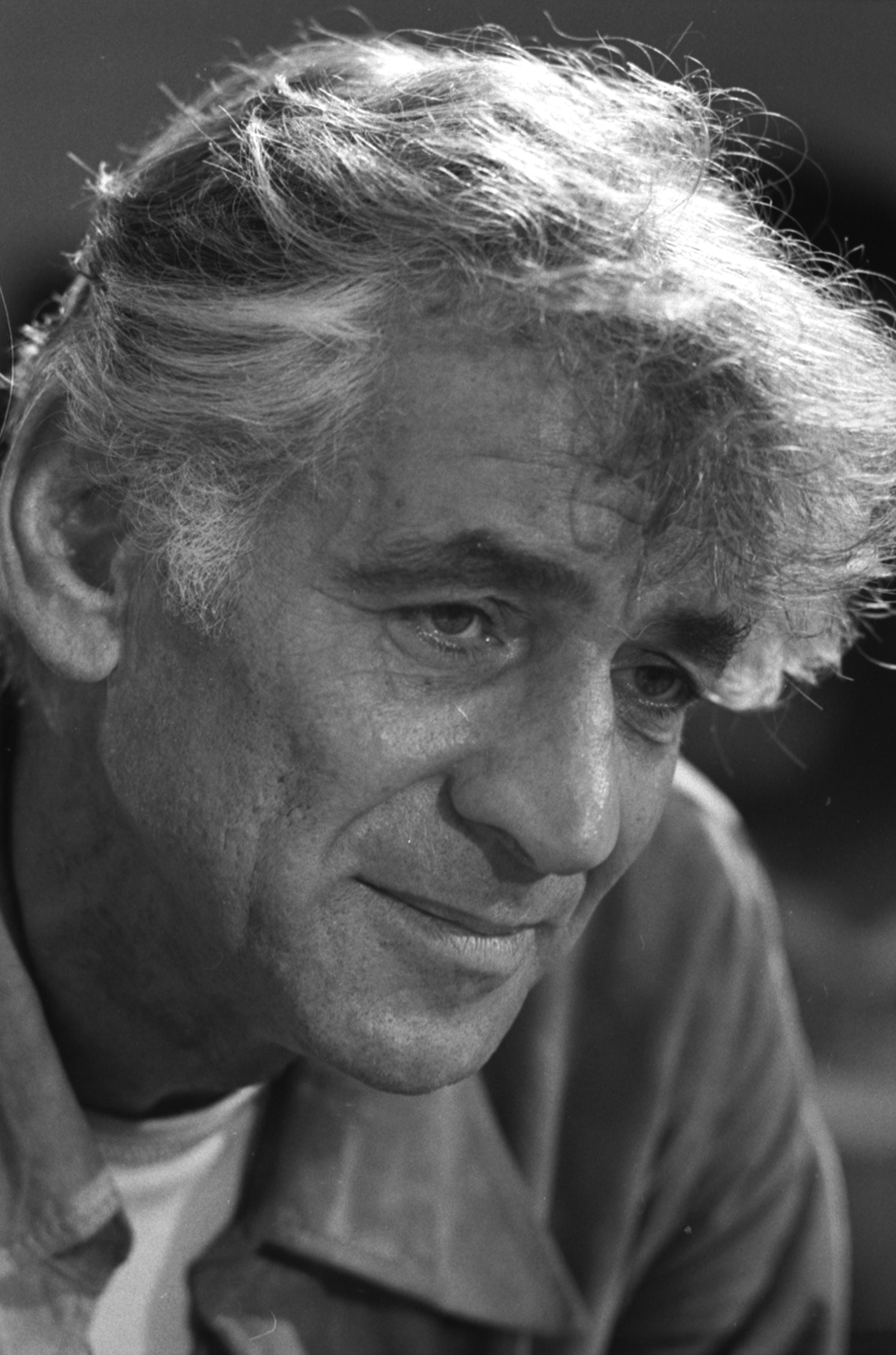
- Leonard Bernstein, c. 1971
- Composed: 1960
- Dedication: Sid Ramin
- Publisher: Boosey & Hawkes

Premiere
- Date: February 13, 1961
- Location: New York
- Conductor: Lukas Foss

Leonard Bernstein's Symphonic Dances from West Side Story was scored in 1960. It is an orchestral suite in nine movements adapted for large symphony orchestra from parts of his musical West Side Story. In the published score, Bernstein thanked Sid Ramin and Irwin Kostal, who prepared the expanded orchestration under his supervision, and who had orchestrated the musical. The suite was premiered by the New York Philharmonic, conducted by Lukas Foss, at New York's Carnegie Hall on February 13, 1961. It was subsequently recorded by Bernstein and others.

== Background ==
West Side Story is a musical adaptation of Shakespeare’s Romeo and Juliet. Set on the Upper West Side of Manhattan in New York City in the mid-20th century, the musical was inspired by tensions between gangs in the city, which were most commonly divided by race. The Montagues and Capulets of Romeo and Juliet are replaced in the musical by two gangs: the Jets (whites) and the Sharks (Puerto Ricans), and Romeo and Juliet are replaced by Tony and Maria. The musical was conceived by Jerome Robbins, with Bernstein writing the music, Stephen Sondheim writing the lyrics, and Arthur Laurents writing the book. The musical was a success when it opened on Broadway in 1957. Bernstein decided to revisit the music, selected 9 excerpts, and put them together into a single piece, titled Symphonic Dances from West Side Story.

== Form ==
According to program notes by Jack Gottlieb, one of Bernstein's assistants, the story of the piece may be summarized as follows:

1. "Prologue": Tensions grow between the two gangs.
2. "Somewhere": In a dream, friendship unites the two gangs.
3. "Scherzo": In the dream, the gangs leave the city and find themselves in a "playful world of space, air, and sun"
4. "Mambo": Returning to the real world, the gangs participate in a competitive dance at the gym.
5. "Cha cha": Maria and Tony first meet and dance together.
6. "Meeting scene": They speak their first words to each other.
7. "Cool": Riff, the leader of the Jets, encourages his gang to harness their impulsive hostility.
8. "Rumble": In a gang battle, Riff and Bernardo (the leader of the Sharks) are killed.
9. "Finale": The two gangs, realizing that violence is no solution, reconcile and unite, fulfilling the vision of "Somewhere"

=== Prologue ===
The music begins in emphatic fashion: a pickup G, which is then followed by a C that jumps up to an F♯ (a tritone). A chromatic 3-note sequence follows. The low instruments then begin playing a theme that would perpetuate the rest of the piece. The music evolves into a dance, played by the violins and the woodwinds. The dance is interrupted several times, until it finally climaxes in a way that resembles the opening bars of the piece. The new section is characterized by sudden jumps by higher instruments, accompanied by a 7-note syncopated baseline. Multiple denser parts and different melodies dot the section, until a police whistle sounds. A quieter section follows concluding the Prologue.

=== Somewhere ===
The music follows into "Somewhere", a slow Adagio which is first played by solo strings. A romantic horn melody follows soon after, which resolves into a high cry by the upper strings, with the cellos and low woodwinds playing descending passages. An intermezzo follows, containing remnants of the previous melody. The original horn melody is then passed onto the seconds and violas, accompanied by the firsts, piano, and harp. A denser cry is then played, which resolves. The flute then plays a quiet melody, and the violins and trumpets lead into a faster section. The faster section is characterized by remnants of the previous slower section. It accelerates, until it reaches the Scherzo section.

=== Scherzo ===
The Scherzo is made up of a playful melody by the woodwinds and violins, often dotted by other instruments with their own small section. It seemingly repeats multiple times, but the section concludes with a recap, and a final uttering of the cry in "Somewhere".

=== Mambo ===
Mambo is a much faster-paced section. The section features percussion playing many complex rhythmic lines, upper strings and low woodwinds playing a dancing melody, and an offbeat rhythm by the bass drum and double bass. Brass sections dot this section, and tension is built until a crucial 4-bar passage is played: a unified section of notes, and the orchestra yelling “Mambo!” An intermezzo is played, and “Mambo!” is repeated. A trumpet rhythm rhythm follows, with complex accompaniment from the rest of the orchestra. Interruptions coming from the rest of the orchestra dot the section, until an earlier part of "Mambo" is restated. The section dies down and slows to transition into the next section.

=== Cha-cha ===
The Cha-cha is characterized by a quiet mainline melody, with a waltz-like accompaniment. It is traced back to the Cha-cha-cha, a dance of Cuban origin. The bass clarinet starts off with the melody, with hints of violin pizzicato and high woodwinds dotting the section. A procession played by the violins then follows. Suddenly, an arpeggio by the celesta follows into the next section.

=== Meeting Scene ===
"Meeting Scene" is derived from “Maria” from the original West Side Story. A high pitched solo violin melody, in which the other strings sometimes join in. The basses start a long A, which crescendos into the next section.

=== Cool ===
"Cool" is a section in which a jazzy fugue is repeated by different instruments. It first starts very low, building steadily as higher instruments join, until a percussive E♭–A–E♭ breaks in. The flutes then take over the melody, which is sometimes interrupted by other melodies. Other instruments join in the melody, until a trumpet takes over, by playing repeated crescendo passages which pop at the end of the phrase. A new fugue is then played, starting with the flutes, then the clarinets, then the entire woodwind section. A swung section is then played by the woodwinds and low strings, dotted by percussive hits from other instruments. More jazzy rhythmic melodies follow, until the next section suddenly slows.

=== Rumble ===
"Rumble" suddenly interrupts "Cool", with percussive hits dotting the piece. A fight is played as a main melody, which is accompanied by a rhythmic bassline. More percussive hits follow. Scurrying from syncopated instruments dot the piece, which then ascends into a high popping tremolo. A chromatic 3-note series follows, which is succeeded by a flute cadenza.

=== Finale ===
"Finale" echoes the second section of "Somewhere", as a high romantic melody is played by the upper strings. Basic accompaniment comes from the lower strings. A shrill cry is played as the final closing notes of the violin melody. Oboes and trumpets take over from the violins, with steady pizzicatos coming from the lower strings. Upper strings and upper woodwinds play closing notes to the section, and a final cadence concludes the piece.

== Instrumentation ==
The score calls for an orchestra consisting of the following instruments:

Woodwinds: 1 piccolo, 2 flutes, 2 oboes, 1 cor anglais, 1 clarinet in E♭, 2 clarinets in B♭, 1 alto saxophone in E♭, 1 bass clarinet, 2 bassoons, 1 contrabassoon

Brass: 4 horns in F, 3 trumpets in B♭ (one doubling trumpet in D), 3 trombones, 1 tuba

Keyboards: 1 piano (doubling celesta)

Strings: violins I, violins II, violas, cellos, double basses, harp

Percussion: 1 pair bongos, 1 tambourine, 1 pair timbales, 1 tom-tom, 2 snares (large and small), 1 conga drum, 1 tenor drum, 1 bass drum, 4 pitched drums (approximately an interval of a third apart), 1 trap set (cymbals, snare drum, tom-toms, bass drum), 1 triangle, 1 suspended cymbal, 1 pair of crash cymbals, 1 pair of finger cymbals, 3 cowbells (1 large), 1 tam-tam, 1 vibraphone, 1 glockenspiel, 1 chime (F♯), 1 woodblock, 1 güiro, 2 maracas (large and small), 1 xylophone, and 1 police whistle; plus a set of timpani (4 drums)

== Recordings ==
Bernstein recorded the Symphonic Dances with the New York Philharmonic in 1961, and with the Los Angeles Philharmonic in 1983. The suite has entered the repertoire of many orchestras around the world and has been recorded by such orchestras as the San Francisco Symphony under the direction of Seiji Ozawa in 1972.
