= Stafford Township Arts Center =

Coordinates: 39.683307°N 74.234644°W

The Stafford Township Arts Center is a theater located in the Manahawkin section of Stafford Township, New Jersey. The Stafford Township Board Of Education now programs and manages the Stafford Township Arts Center (STAC.)

STAC has offered performances by legends such as Rita Moreno, Joy Behar, the Garden State Philharmonic, and Anthony Rapp.

The Stafford Township Arts Center is no longer managed by the Education Foundation. The Arts Center is now operated by the Stafford Township School District Board of Education. The venue is managed by Marybeth Weidenhof (STBOE). The Current Technical Director on Staff is Taylor Brennan (STBOE).

The Stafford Township Arts Center was formed to serve as a cultural center for the arts, and to act as a resource for children, adults and artists who seek to improve their lives thourhg arts education and programming. The Stafford Township Arts Center is both a live theater facility and a performing arts conservatory. As a live theater facility, the STAC provides opportunity for local artists as well as featuring top rate national acts.
