= New York Festival of Song =

Annual series of concerts in New York

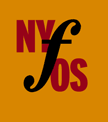
NYFOS

The New York Festival of Song (NYFOS) presents an annual series of concerts in New York City dedicated to the art of song, classical, modern and popular. In addition, this organization commissions new works and recordings, including the Grammy Award-winning recording of Leonard Bernstein's Arias and Barcarolles (Koch), and the Grammy-nominated recording of Ned Rorem's Evidence of Things Not Seen (1997, New World Records).

The New York Festival of Song record label NYFOS Records has received two Grammy Award nominations including "Schubert Beatles" at the 68th annual awards with Theo Hoffman and Steven Blier and "My Brother's Keeper" at the 69th annual awards featuring Steven Blier, Joshua Blue, Will Liverman, Joseph Parrish, Chaz’men Williams-Ali, Jorell Williams and Alan Williams.

== History ==
The festival was founded in 1988 by Steven Blier and Michael Barrett.

For the 100th anniversary of the Juilliard School in January 2006, NYFOS collaborated on a program featuring "100 Years of Juilliard Composers in Song".

In 2007, NYFOS released a live-recording CD entitled Spanish Love Songs (Bridge), featuring Lorraine Hunt Lieberson and Joseph Kaiser, performing with Blier and Barrett at Caramoor. The program was recorded live just before Lieberson's death in 2006.

In December 2008, Bridge Records released an original cast recording of Bastianello / Lucrezia, featuring soprano Lisa Vroman, mezzo-soprano Sasha Cooke, tenor Paul Appleby, baritone Patrick Mason and bass Matt Boehler, with pianists Steven Blier and Michael Barrett. With a score by John Musto and a libretto by Mark Campbell, Bastianello is a family fable of love and folly based on a poignant Italian folk tale. In March 2008, it had its World Premiere, along with William Bolcom's comic piece Lucrezia (a version of Machiavelli′s La Mandragola, libretto also by Mark Campbell) at Weill Recital Hall at Carnegie Hall, commissioned and presented by the New York Festival of Song.

== Notable programs ==
NYFOS has created and premiered over a hundred unique programs, many of which have toured the United States. Some that have been favorably reviewed and/or frequently reprised:

At Harlem's Height, premiered in 2001, explores the music of the Harlem Renaissance, with songs by Eubie Blake, Fats Waller, William Grant Still, Florence Price and others.

Songs of Peace and War, premiered in 2001, shortly after the World Trade Center attack.

Dvořák and the American Soul, premiered in 2002, juxtaposes songs by Czech composer Antonín Dvořák and those of his African-American students from the period in the 1890s when he was teaching at the National Conservatory in New York, showing how each influenced the other.

Blok and Akhmatova: Poets Without Heroes, premiered in 2005, explores music composed around the work of these Russian poets.
