= Aaron Lazar =

American actor, artist and entrepreneur

- Born: Aaron Scott Lazar; June 21, 1976 (age 50); Cherry Hill, New Jersey, U.S.
- Education: Duke University (BA); University of Cincinnati (MFA)
- Occupations: Actor, singer
- Years active: 2000–present
- Spouse: LeAnn Garris (m. 2004; div. 2018)
- Children: 2 sons
- Website: www.aaronlazar.com

Aaron Scott Lazar (born June 21, 1976) is an American actor, singer, and entrepreneur known for his work on Broadway, television, film and concerts.

In August 2024, Lazar released an album titled, Impossible Dream, featuring a cover of the song of the same name. The cover of the song was in a We Are the World style recording featuring solos by Josh Groban, Loren Allred, Sting, Brian Stokes Mitchell, Norm Lewis, Kristin Chenoweth, Leslie Odom Jr, Lin Manuel Miranda, Neil Patrick Harris, and a posthumous appearance from Rebecca Luker. The album was nominated for a Grammy Award for "Best Classical Compendium" in November, 2024.

== Early life and education ==
Lazar was born in Cherry Hill, New Jersey. He graduated from Cherry Hill High School West, where he performed in musicals and competed in track and field as a discus and javelin thrower. He is Jewish and had a Bar Mitzvah. Lazar attended Duke University, where he earned a Bachelor of Art degree, magna cum laude, while completing the prerequisite classes for medical school and taking the MCAT. After being accepted at the University of Cincinnati – College-Conservatory of Music (CCM), he earned an MFA in musical theater.

== Career ==
=== Broadway and theater ===
Lazar's eleven Broadway and national tour credits include The Phantom of the Opera as understudy Raoul, Oklahoma! as Joe and understudy Curly, The Scarlet Pimpernel as Dewhurst and understudy Percy, Mamma Mia! as Sam, The Last Ship as Arthur, Impressionism as Ben, A Little Night Music as Count Carl-Magnus Malcolm, Dear Evan Hansen as Larry Murphy, Les Misérables (Drama Desk Award nominee) as Enjolras, A Tale of Two Cities as Charles, and The Light in the Piazza as Fabrizio.

Since he started performing at age nine, Lazar has performed in more than forty professional productions including A New Brain and Gentlemen Prefer Blondes at New York City Center Encores! In 2007, he was Lt. Joseph Cable in South Pacific at the Hollywood Bowl. In 2016, he played Franklin Shepard in a Los Angeles production of Merrily We Roll Along. He was most recently in Fun Home as Bruce at TheaterWorks Hartford and the pre-Broadway regional tryout of The Secret Garden as Dr. Neville Craven at the Ahmanson Theatre in Los Angeles. Lazar played Paul in the 2011 New York Philharmonic concert version of Company. He was also in Anastasia as Gleb in a 2012 workshop.

=== Television and film ===
Lazar has starred in over 20 television shows including the role of Reverend Paul Thomas on Fox's Filthy Rich. He's also known for roles in The Wolf of Wall Street, This Is Where I Leave You, J. Edgar, and Everything Everywhere All at Once.

=== Concert and cabaret ===
Lazar has performed with some of the world's top symphonies from the New York Philharmonic to the NYPops at Carnegie Hall to the Kennedy Center, to Masada as both a guest artist and soloist with his own one-man shows Broadway to Hollywood and All For You, with Tony nominee Kate Baldwin, maestro Luke Frazier, and members of the American Pops Orchestra.

His voice can be heard on numerous Broadway and off-Broadway cast albums.

During the COVID-19 pandemic, Lazar produced the album Broadway Lullabies with a cast of Broadway friends and parents to soothe families with reimagined Broadway classics.

== Personal life ==
In 2004, he married LeAnn Garris, a model signed with Ford Models at Temple Israel, a Reform synagogue in Wilmington in North Carolina. The couple had two boys together and divorced in 2018.

In January 2024, Lazar announced that he had been diagnosed with amyotrophic lateral sclerosis (ALS) two years prior.

== Filmography ==
=== Film ===
Year	Title	Role	Notes
2005	The Notorious Bettie Page	Jake	
2011	Company	Paul	
2011	J. Edgar	David T. Wilentz	
2013	The Wolf of Wall Street	Blair Hollingsworth	
2014	This Is Where I Leave You	Barry Weissman	
2018	Avengers: Infinity War	Doctor Strange Double	
2019	Avengers: Endgame	Doctor Strange Double	
2022	Everything Everywhere All at Once	Soldier	
TBA	Kockroach	—N/a	Producer only

=== Television ===
Year	Title	Role	Notes
2006	Live from Lincoln Center	Fabrizio Naccarelli / Self	Episode: "The Light in the Piazza
2008	New Amsterdam	Ben Robbins	Episode: "Horror"
2008	Ugly Betty	Claudio	Episode: "Bad Amanda"
2009	All My Children	Ron Lipkin / Producer	2 episodes
2009	White Collar	Father D'Allesio	Episode: "Book of Hours"
2011	A Gifted Man	Steve Powers	Episode: "In Case of Discomfort"
2011	Onion News Network	O'Brady Shaw	7 episodes
2012	Person of Interest	Terrance Baxter	Episode: "Firewall"
2014	The Following	Billy Boyer	2 episodes
2014	The Good Wife	William Sattmann	Episode: "The Last Call"
2014	Blue Bloods	Dr. Levin	Episode: "Righting Wrongs"
2014	The Blacklist	Agent Paul Salerno	Episode: "Monarch Douglas Bank (No. 112)"
2016	Unforgettable	Avra Feld	Episode: "Breathing Space"
2016	Girl Meets World	Mr. Jackson	2 episodes
2016	The Strain	Kroft	3 episodes
2016	Quantico	Paul	3 episodes
2018	Bull	Mark Burns	Episode: "Justified"
2018	The Good Fight	William Sattmann	Episode: "Day 471"
2020	Filthy Rich	Paul Luke Thomas	10 episodes
2022	Black-ish	Andrew Collins	Episode: "That's What Friends Are For"
2022	Yellowstone	Robert Baldus	Episode: "Tall Drink of Water"

=== Theatre ===
Year	Title	Role	Notes
2000-2001	The Scarlet Pimpernel	Dewhurst u/s Sir Percy Blakeney	US Tour
2001	Carousel	Billy Bigelow	North Shore Music Theatre
2001-2002	The Phantom of the Opera	Fireman u/s Raoul	Broadway
2002-2003	Oklahoma!	Joe u/s Curly	Broadway
2005	On the Town	Gabey	West End
2005-2006	The Light in the Piazza	Fabrizio Naccarelli	Broadway
2006-2007	Les Misérables	Enjolras	Broadway
2007	South Pacific	Lieutenant Cable	Hollywood Bowl
2008	A Tale of Two Cities	Charles Darnay	Broadway
2009	Impressionism	Ben Joplin	Broadway
2009-2010	A Little Night Music	Count Carl-Magnus Malcolm	Broadway
2011	Company	Paul	Avery Fisher Hall
2012	Anastasia	Gleb	Workshop
2012	Gentlemen Prefer Blondes	Henry Spofford	Off-Broadway; Encores!
2012-2014	Mamma Mia!	Sam Carmichael	Broadway
2014-2015	The Last Ship	Arthur Millburn	Broadway
2015	A New Brain	Roger Delli-Bovi	Off-Broadway; Encores!
2016	Merrily We Roll Along	Franklin Shepard	Wallis Annenberg Center for the Performing Arts
2018-2019	Dear Evan Hansen	Larry Murphy	US Tour
2022	The Bridges of Madison County	Robert	Axelrod Performing Arts Center
2022	Fun Home	Bruce	TheaterWorks
2023	The Secret Garden	Dr. Neville Craven	Ahmanson Theatre
2025	Follies	Benjamin Stone	Pasadena Playhouse
