= National Children's Chorus =

American choir

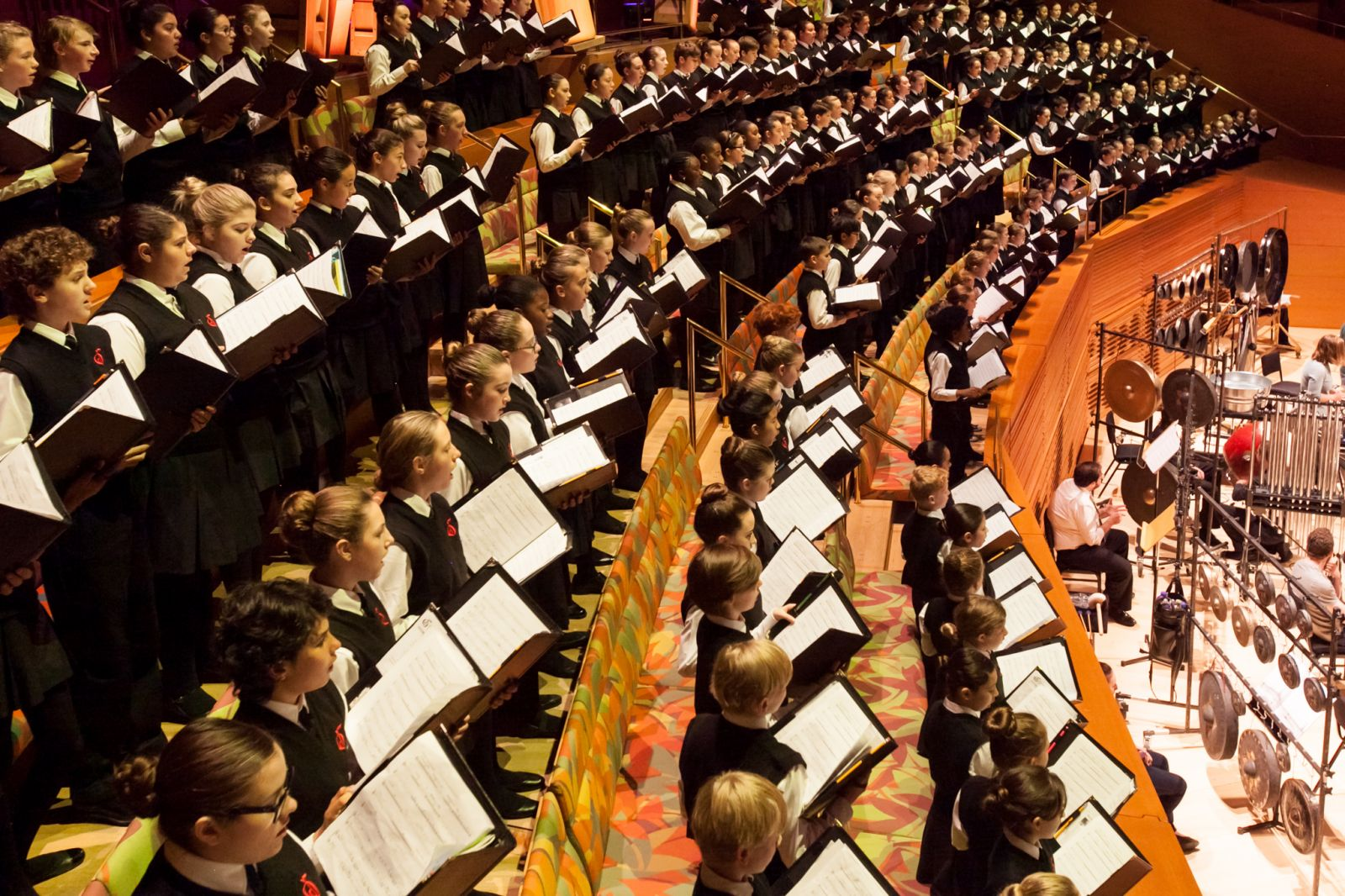
National Children's Chorus at Walt Disney Concert Hall (Los Angeles) in 2016

The National Children's Chorus of the United States of America (NCC) is a private, non-profit youth choral organization under the leadership of Artistic Director Luke McEndarfer and Associate Artistic Director Dr. Pamela Blackstone. It has over 1,400 choristers and its members are between the ages of five and eighteen, and divided into Junior Division (Prelude, Minuet, Sonata, and Concerto Levels) and Senior Division (Debut and Premier Ensembles, and Scholars) across its eight chapter cities – Los Angeles, New York, Washington, D.C., San Francisco, Austin, Dallas, Boston (Newton) and Chicago (Evanston).

The NCC is a GRAMMY® Award-winning ensemble, receiving the honor for Best Choral Performance of Mahler's Symphony No. 8 with Gustavo Dudamel and the Los Angeles Philharmonic. The ensemble has made multiple appearances on NBC's TODAY Show and performs regularly at Lincoln Center, Carnegie Hall, Walt Disney Concert Hall, Hollywood Bowl, and the National Cherry Blossom Festival Parade in Washington D.C. The chorus also holds biannual winter and spring showcases in each of their chapter cities.

== Origins ==
Though now fully secularized, National Children's Chorus traces its lineage back to the Paulist tradition of the late 19th Century.

=== Paulist Choristers ===
In 1904 Father William Finn (1881–1961) founded the Paulist Choristers of Chicago, an a capella, treble choir for boys (ages 5–13), which sang at the Vatican for Pope Pius X in 1912, and toured the United States during World War I to raise money for French refugee relief efforts. In 1918, Father Finn established the first Catholic Choir School in New York, and founded the Paulist Choristers of New York at the Church of St. Paul the Apostle in Manhattan.

In 1925, the New York ensemble began to perform on radio station WLWL, and also on the NBC radio show The Catholic Hour. The choir also gave frequent concerts at the Metropolitan Opera House. In addition to performances, each ensemble maintained separate recording projects with Columbia Records and Victor Records. In 1928, Father Eugene O’Malley, an original Chicago Paulist chorister, succeeded Father Finn as director of the Chicago ensemble. Under his leadership the choir once again traveled across the country, and performed at the White House.

In the 1960s and 1970s, the Chicago and New York groups were disbanded during a liturgical shift towards contemporary sacred music throughout the Catholic Church in the United States. In 1977, despite the reformation in Catholic liturgy, Sister Stella Maria Enright (1933–2017) and Jon Wattenberger (1948–1992), a pupil of Father Finn's teachings, founded the Paulist Choristers of California at St. Paul the Apostle Church and School in Westwood, Los Angeles. The ensemble subsequently performed with the Los Angeles Philharmonic, Hollywood Bowl Orchestra, Los Angeles Master Chorale, and the Joffrey Ballet, in addition to multiple television/movie appearances and international tours to London, Oxford, Venice, Florence, Salzburg, and Paris.

After Wattenberger's death, the ensemble was led, between 1992 and 2004, by conductors Dana Marsh and Sir Martin Neary, who famously conducted music for the funeral of Princess Diana in 1997.

In 2002, the Paulist Choristers were invited to sing music from The Lord of the Rings with the Hollywood Bowl Orchestra, under the baton of maestro John Mauceri. For the first time in Paulist history, girls were inducted into the organization, marking the first-ever co-ed appearance for the group.

=== Transition to National Children's Chorus ===
In 2004, following the exit of Neary from the position, Luke McEndarfer was chosen as the 4th Artistic Director of the Paulist Choristers of California.

In 2009, with the support of Sister Stella, McEndarfer fully secularized the chorus, formally changed the group's name, and co-founded the National Children's Chorus with Cristina Demiany. This organizational change signified the formal separation of the group from the Catholic Church after more than a century. Accompanying this transition, the National Children's Chorus launched a new educational curriculum for its students that includes music theory, Kodaly Musicianship, and private voice lessons.

NCC broadened its programming to create ensembles for children of varying ages and vocal facility, including its first-ever SATB ensemble, and expanded to New York (2011), Washington, D.C. (2014), San Francisco (2019), Austin (2021), Dallas (2022), Boston (2022) and Chicago (2024).

The organization maintains conductor training partnerships with graduate conducting programs at the University of Southern California (2016) and Manhattan School of Music (2017), in addition to partnerships with the San Francisco Conservatory of Music and the University of California, Los Angeles.

In 2021, the NCC introduced its inaugural opera program for young artists, the Vail Opera Camp, which featured students performing Brundibár, a recording of which was released the following year. Additional staged performances in subsequent years include The Odyssey and The Tinker of Tivoli. Starting its transition in 2023, the Vail Opera Camp is now known as the National Youth Opera Academy.

== Major Appearances ==
• 9th NCC International Tour to Australia, including a performance at the Edge in Melbourne (July 2025)

• 8th NCC International Tour to Denmark and Norway, including a performance at the Oslo Opera House with Composer Ola Gjeilo (July 2024)

• Illumine: The Holiday Album album release with the London Symphony Orchestra – recorded at Air Studios and Abbey Road Studios in London (2023)

• 7th NCC International Tour to the United Kingdom, including a performance with Voces8 (July 2023)

• Brundibár: A Children's Tribute to Ukraine album release on all streaming platforms – recorded virtually in dedication to the people of Ukraine (September 2022)

• 6th NCC International Tour to Portugal and Spain, including performances at Madrid's Auditorio Nacional de Música and Barcelona's Basílica de la Sagrada Família (July 2022)

• Ripples of Change at Alice Tully Hall – featuring choristers from all chapter cities (May 2022)

• 5th NCC International Tour (Korean DMZ performance with Lindenbaum Festival Orchestra, Mapo Art Center in Seoul, South Korea, Kyoto Concert Hall, and Tokyo's Suntory Hall, July 2019)

• Walt Disney Hall Premiere of Mahler's "Symphony of a Thousand" with the LA Philharmonic and Gustavo Dudamel (May 2019)

• World Premiere of a Nico Muhly work for chorus and orchestra at Walt Disney Hall with American Youth Symphony (March 2019)

• 4th NCC International Tour (Berlin Wall, Germany, Musikverein and Schönbrunn Palace in Vienna, Prague, Budapest, July 2018)

• World Premiere of Ibrahim Maalouf's Levantine Symphony No.1 at the Kennedy Center (March 2018)

• Live commercial performance of "I'll Stand by You" produced by MassMutual for CNN's New Year's Eve Live with Anderson Cooper and Andy Cohen (December 2017)

• "Winter Dream" at Alice Tully Hall – featuring choristers from all three chapter cities (December 2017)

• Festival of Carols at Walt Disney Hall with the Los Angeles Master Chorale and Eric Whitacre (December 2017)

• 3rd NCC International Tour (St. Mark's Basilica in Venice, St. Peter's Basilica at the Vatican, and St. Cecilia's Music Conservatory in Rome, Italy, July 2017)

• Carmina Burana at Alice Tully Hall with New York Master Chorale (April 2016)

• 2nd NCC International Tour (the Great Wall of China in Beijing and the Ancient City Wall in Xian, China 2016)

• Tan Dun's Symphony 1997 at Walt Disney Concert Hall with American Youth Symphony Orchestra (March 2016)

• Carmina Burana at the Hollywood Bowl with the Los Angeles Philharmonic conducted by Gustavo Dudamel (July 2015)

• 1st NCC International Tour (Sheldonian Theatre in Oxford and St. John's Smith Square in London, England, June 2015)

• Feast of the Divine Shepherd at Carnegie Hall with Yale School of Music (June 2015)
