= Steven Blier =

American pianist

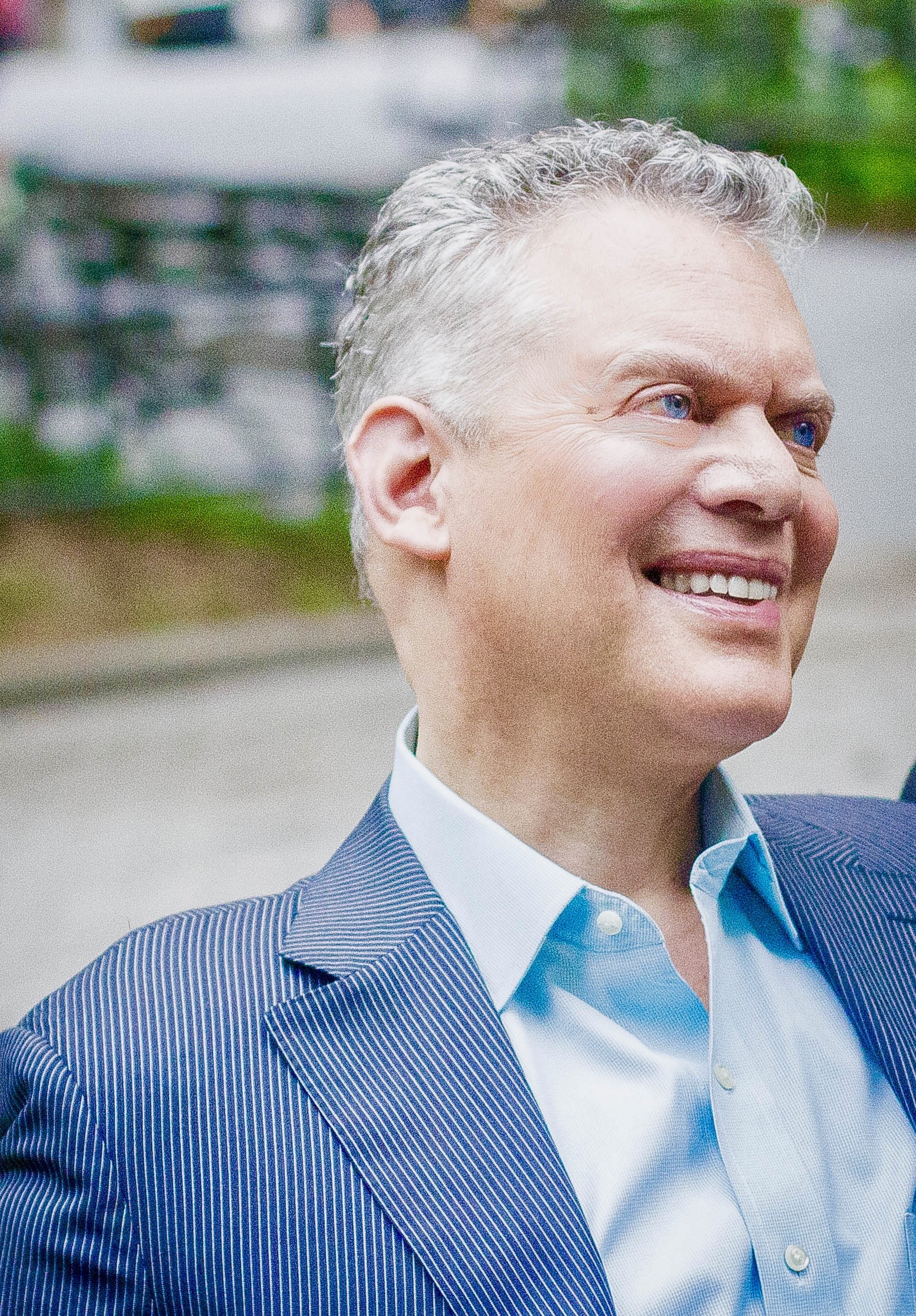
- Musician Steven Blier (Photo: Olivia Wolf)
- Born: November 25, 1951 (age 74); New York City
- Education: Yale
- Occupation: Musician
- Known for: Co-founder NYFOS
- Spouse: James S. Russell

Steven Blier (born November 25, 1951) is an American pianist, recital accompanist, musicologist, and, since 1992, a faculty member in the Department of Vocal Arts at The Juilliard School. in New York City. He is the artistic director and co-founder of the New York Festival of Song (NYFOS) with former Chief Executive and General Director of Caramoor, Michael Barrett. Blier was also a casting adviser at the New York City Opera and a regular performer at Wolf Trap and Caramoor. He has been active in encouraging young recitalists at summer programs, including the Wolf Trap Opera Company, the Steans Music Institute at Ravinia, the Santa Fe Opera, and the San Francisco Opera Center. He has written articles for Opera News and The Yale Review.

The New York Festival of Song was founded in 1988 with the motto "No song is safe from us" and is one of Blier's signature accomplishments; he has produced more than 140 recitals for the nonprofit arts organization. Pulitzer Prize-winning classical music critic Justin Davidson called NYFOS "the oldest permanent floating song party in New York". Blier programs NYFOS concerts "...on the democratic premise that all songs -- from Brahms to Broadway to the Beatles -- are created equal. In place of the formality of the traditional recital, the festival offers groups of good young singers in smart, offbeat programs, each organized around a theme." He is known for his well-researched and literate program notes, translations of lyrics from a variety of languages, and his onstage presence and wit as emcee, raconteur and pianist. He says that "a concert should use music to get you close to something in an emotional and intellectual way.” Blier emphasizes emotional intensity, both in his choice of songs and his coaching of the singers who work with him: “A song is the closest thing I know in waking life to dreaming. It’s a coded version of reality. It’s not like playing a scene from Chekhov, where you’re trying to look like you’re having a tea party or a nervous breakdown. Instead, you’re enacting a coded, ritualized version of that moment, and somehow everyone in the hall is dreaming along with you.”

Blier is a major proponent of contemporary art song and has programmed many new works including those by John Musto, Ned Rorem, Roberto Sierra, and Clarice Assad, among many others. A review of a program of Polish art song entitled "Warsaw Serenade" noted that a "broader existential approach seems to inform the uncommonly eloquent programs assembled and performed by the New York Festival of Song. Art songs here are celebrated for the sensual pleasures they bring but also for the improbably numerous ways in which they open out onto larger worlds of history, poetry, and biography, distant geographic landscapes and the veiled interior regions within...[I]t was Blier whose printed essay and spoken commentary, marbled with playful lines of wit, erudition and anecdote, gave the program its distinctive personal touch."

== Personal life ==
Blier was born November 25, 1951, in New York City. His parents were Josephine Berg Blier and Julius Blier. He received a bachelor's degree with Honors in English Literature at Yale University, where he studied piano with Alexander Farkas. He continued his studies in New York with Matin Isepp, Paul Jacobs, and Janine Reiss.

He is married to James S. Russell, an architecture writer and critic, former professor at the Bernard and Anne Spitzer School of Architecture at City College of New York and frequent contributor to The New York Times, Architectural Record, and The Economist. Russell is the author of the book, The Agile City: Building Well-being and Wealth in an Era of Climate Change

Blier lives with facioscapulohumeral muscular dystrophy and supports fundraisers for the FSHD Society.

== Recordings ==
- Blitzstein: Zipperfly and Other Songs. Karen Holvik, soprano; William Sharp, baritone; Steven Blier, piano. Koch International Classics 3-7050-2
- Bernstein: Arias and Barcarolles (Koch International Classics). Grammy Award (1990) for Best Contemporary Composition
- William Sharp, baritone (New World Records) Songs by Bowles, Thomson, Musto, Hoiby, and others. Grammy Nominee for Best Classical Vocal Soloist Performance
- Rorem: Evidence of Things Not Seen (New World Records) Grammy Nominee
- He Loves and She Loves: Songs by Gershwin (Koch International)
- Blitzstein: Zipperfly and Other Songs (Koch International)
- Unquiet Peace: The Lied Between the Wars (Koch International)
- Lady, Be Good! Gershwin (Nonesuch)
- Bolcom: Lucrezia / Musto: Bastianello (Bridge Records)
- Spanish Love Songs, with Lorraine Hunt Lieberson and Joseph Kaiser (Bridge Records)
- Quiet Please, with Darius de Haas (Bridge Records)
- Canción amorosa, with Corinne Winters (GPR Recordings)

== Reaction ==
The New York Times Op Ed columnist Joe Nocera wrote: "I had never heard anything like a NYFOS concert — still haven’t, really. There are no microphones; Blier believes deeply that unmiked music creates a more intimate experience. At a NYFOS concert, the lyrics matter as much as the music."

Washington Post critic Ronald Broun wrote: "A few words of high praise are utterly inadequate to describe what Steven Blier accomplished Saturday night at the Barns of Wolf Trap. Start with this: Blier knows everything about the mechanics and art of singing, songs and songwriting (he draws no distinction between classical and pop), and piano accompaniment. He is a passionate, indefatigable researcher and scholar who haunts libraries, finds wonderful songs that time has obliterated and gives them new life."
