= Arun Shenoy discography =

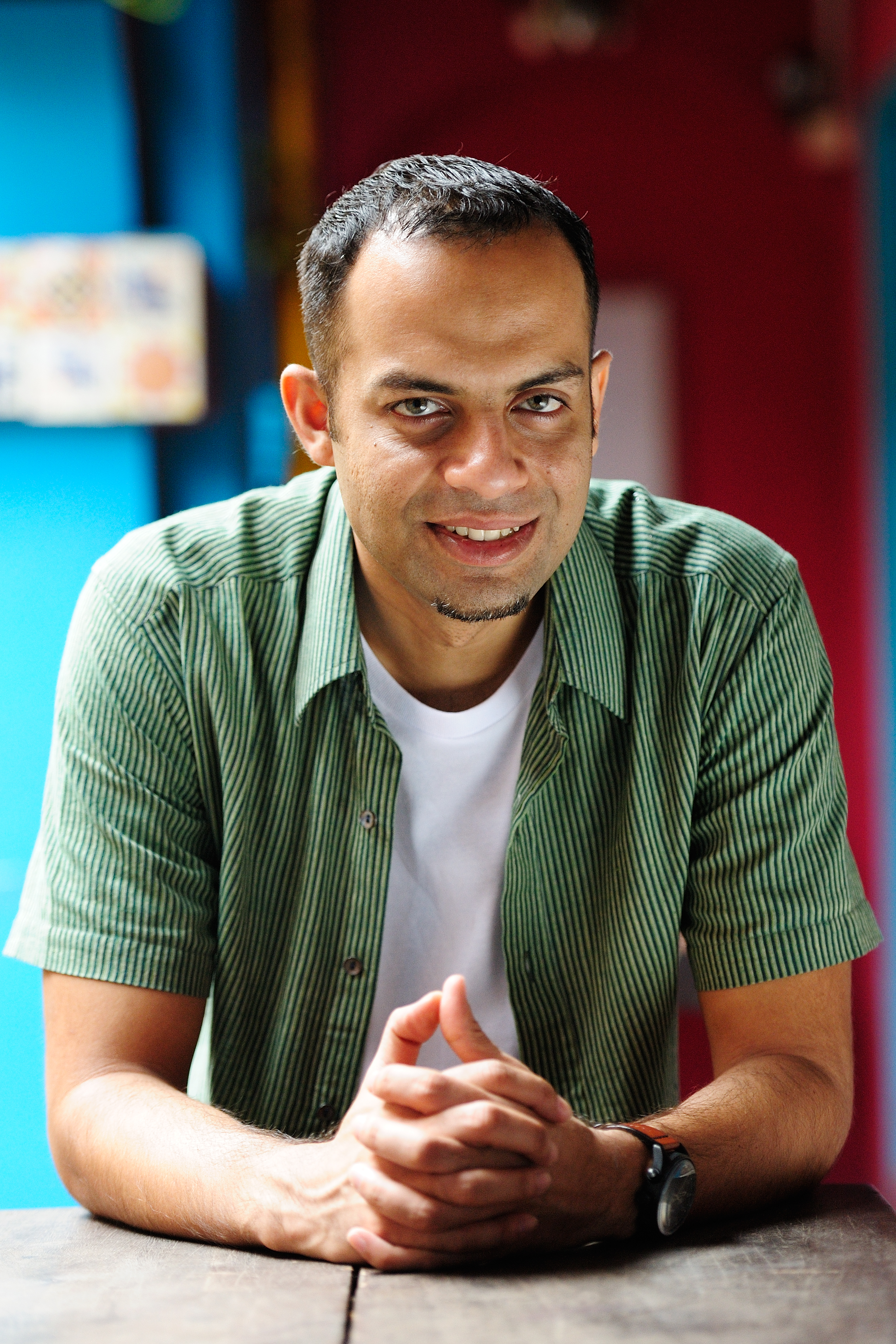
- Studio albums: 2
- EPs: 1
- Singles: 7

The discography of Arun Shenoy, a Singaporean composer and music producer of Indian origin, consists of two studio albums, seven singles and one extended play (EP) release

== Studio albums ==
Title	Album details	Role	Release date	Label
Rumbadoodle	Solo	Primary Artist	August 30, 2012	Arun Shenoy Music Publishing
A Stagey Bank Affair	Collaboration with The Groove Project	Primary Artist	July 1, 2016	Narked Records

== Singles ==
Title	Album details	Role	Release date	Label
Genesis	Collaboration with Matthew Shell	Primary Artist	April 25, 2013	MTS Music/Narked Records
Bliss	Solo	Primary Artist	August 30, 2013	Narked Records
Make Up Your Mind Or Leave it Behind (feat. Lonnie Park)	Collaboration with Sridhar	Primary Artist	May 7, 2014	Narked Records
Illusion	Collaboration with Sridhar	Primary Artist	August 5, 2014	Narked Records
Soul'd	With Soul'd	Group Member	September 5, 2014	Narked Records
Sugar Free (feat. Uziel)	Collaboration with The Groove Project	Primary Artist	June 3, 2016	Narked Records
Mary Go Around	Collaboration with The Groove Project	Primary Artist	March 1, 2017	Narked Records
If I Knew	Collaboration with Elizabeth Butler (musician)	Primary Artist	July 1, 2017	Narked Records

== Extended plays ==
Title	Album details	Role	Release date	Label
Sol	Solo	Primary Artist	October 30, 2010	Arun Shenoy Publishing
