= Conflicted (song) =

Single by Kitt Wakeley

from the album Symphony of Sinners & Saints
- Released: 26 February 2021
- Recorded: Abbey Road Studio
- Length: 3:21
- Label: Studio Seven Media
- Songwriter(s): Kitt Wakeley
- Producer(s): Kitt Wakeley, Tre Nagella

Kitt Wakeley singles chronology
"Conflicted" (2021)	"Forgive Me" (2021)

Music video
- "Conflicted" on YouTube

"Conflicted" is a song by American composer, songwriter, musician, and music producer Kitt Wakeley, from his 2021 album Symphony of Sinners & Saints. The song was produced by Wakeley and Tre Nagella, and features Joe Satriani on guitar. Released in February, 2021, as the lead single from the album, "Conflicted" charted at #18 on Billboard's Hot Hard Rock Chart.

The single was recorded at Abbey Road Studio and features the Royal Philharmonic Orchestra and London Voices, conducted by Cliff Masterson.

When asked by Ultimate Classic Rock about playing on Wakeley's single, Satriani said, "Playing guitar on Kitt's new album has been a fun, exhilarating experience, and a musical challenge, too. Kitt's huge, cinematic sound makes each one of his songs a powerful sonic journey. I'm so happy I was able contribute to this stellar album."

"Conflicted" received favorable reviews, with Metal Talk writing, "An incredibly potent mix of heavy rock rhythms juxtaposed with a classical orchestra and choir, this is cinematic music at its most powerful and thrilling."

== Charts ==
Chart (2021)	Peak position
US Hot Hard Rock Songs (Billboard)	18
US Hard Rock Digital Sales (Billboard)	1
US Rock Digital Song Sales (Billboard)	6

== Personnel ==
=== Musicians ===
- Piano, synthesizer, and conductor - Kitt Wakeley
- Guitar - Joe Satriani
- Orchestra - Royal Philharmonic Orchestra
- Choir - London Voices
- Bass - Ryan Miller
- Drums - Brent Berry

=== Technical ===
- Producers - Kitt Wakeley and Tre Nagella
- Recording engineer - Lewis Jones
- Mixing engineer - Tre Nagella
- Mastering engineer - Kevin Lively
- Recording studio - Abbey Road Studios, London, UK
- Mixing studio - Luminous Studios - Dallas, Texas
- Mastering studio - Lively Mastering - Oklahoma City, Oklahoma
