= An Adoption Story =

Studio album by Kitt Wakeley featuring Starr Parodi
- Released: September 28, 2022
- Studio: Abbey Road Studios; Remote Control Studios; Luminous Sound Studio
- Genre: Symphonic Rock; Classical Crossover
- Length: 23:01
- Label: Studio Seven Media
- Producer: Kitt Wakeley; Tre Nagella; Starr Parodi

An Adoption Story is a Grammy-winning classical compendium album by Kitt Wakeley (featuring Starr Parodi). The album reached No. 5 on the Billboard Classical Crossover Albums chart and features the London Symphony, Joe Satriani, and Wouter Kellerman, among others.

== Background ==
An Adoption Story is an orchestral classical compendium album, inspired by Wakeley's time in the foster care system and as an adoptive parent of three siblings.

The album features Starr Parodi, London Symphony, Joe Satriani, and Wouter Kellerman, among others.

An Adoption Story peaked at No. 5 on the Billboard Classical Crossover Albums chart and was featured on the Tamron Hall Show where he shared in depth about his adoption story.

== Track listing ==
No.	Title	Writer(s)	Producer(s)	Length
1.	"Sacred"	Kitt Wakeley	Kitt Wakeley; Starr Parodi; Tre Nagella	6:01
2.	"The Storm"	Kitt Wakeley	Wakeley; Parodi; Nagella	3:36
3.	"Asa"	Kitt Wakeley	Wakeley; Parodi; Nagella	4:34
4.	"No Apologies"	Kitt Wakeley	Wakeley; Parodi; Nagella	4:04
5.	"St. Christopher's Journey" (featuring Joe Satriani)	Kitt Wakeley	Wakeley; Parodi; Nagella	3:36
6.	"No Apologies"	Kitt Wakeley	Wakeley; Parodi; Nagella	4:01
7.	"Sacred (Reprise)"	Kitt Wakeley	Wakeley; Parodi; Nagella	1:10
Total length:				23:01

== Personnel ==
=== Musicians ===
- Artist, composer, arranger - Kitt Wakeley (all tracks)
- Piano - Starr Parodi (track 1, 3, 4, 5)
- Orchestra - London Symphony (track 1, 2, 3, 5)
- Violin - Isolde Faire (track 1, 4, 5, 6)
- Violin - Patrick Conlon – Violin (track 1)
- Violin - Lili Haydn (track 1)
- Percussion - MB Gordy (all tracks)
- Flute - Wouter Kellerman (track 1, 6)
- Violin - Wenlan Jackson (track 2)
- Cello - Tess Remy-Schumacher (track 4)
- Trumpet - Wayne Bergeron (track 3)
- Guitar - Joe Satriani (tracks 1, 6)
- Additional Keyboards - Vahagn Stepanyan (tracks 4)
- Vocals - Helena Buschema (track 5 )
- Harp - Kirsten Agresta Copely (track 1)
- Ancillary Percussion - Brent Berry (all tracks)
- Bass Strings - Ryan Miller (all tracks)

=== Technical ===
- Mastering engineer - Gavin Lurssen (all tracks)
- Recording engineer - John Barrett (London Orchestra - Abbey Road)
- Recording engineer - Tre Nagella (London Orchestra - Abbey Road)
- Assistant recording engineer - Patrick Conlon (all tracks)
- Assistant recording engineer - Will Jones (all tracks)
- Additional engineering - Vahagn Stepanyan (all tracks)
- Drum tracking engineer - Paige Harwell (all tracks)
