= Seven Seasons =

Studio album by Kitt Wakeley
- Released: August 22, 2025
- Recorded: 2025
- Studio: Abbey Road Studios
- Genres: Classical, Orchestral
- Length: 40:45
- Label: Studio Seven Media
- Producers: Kitt Wakeley, Jeff Eden Fair, Starr Parodi

Seven Seasons (also known as Se7en Seasons) is a studio album by American orchestral composer, multi-instrumentalist, and music producer Kitt Wakeley and features Starr Parodi and Royal Philharmonic Orchestra. The album was recorded at Abbey Road Studios in 2025 and was nominated for a Grammy Award for Best Classical Compendium that same year.

When Wakeley and his wife's son died in 2023, he started interviewing people who had survived tragedies. Each track on the album was inspired by interviews Wakeley conducted with survivors of tragedies including families of victims of the September 11 attacks, natural disasters, and the Oklahoma City bombing.

== Track listing ==
Seven Seasons
No.	Title	Writer(s)	Producer(s)	Length
1.	"Day of Innocence"	Kitt Wakeley	Kitt Wakeley, Starr Parodi, Jeff Eden Fair	3:50
2.	"Day of Tragedy"	Kitt Wakeley	Kitt Wakeley, Starr Parodi, Jeff Eden Fair	4:36
3.	"Day of Disbelief"	Kitt Wakeley	Kitt Wakeley, Starr Parodi, Jeff Eden Fair	2:37
4.	"Day of Confusion"	Kitt Wakeley	Kitt Wakeley, Starr Parodi, Jeff Eden Fair	3:53
5.	"Day of Why"	Kitt Wakeley	Kitt Wakeley, Starr Parodi, Jeff Eden Fair	4:20
6.	"Day of Reflection"	Kitt Wakeley	Kitt Wakeley, Starr Parodi, Jeff Eden Fair	6:04
7.	"Day of Hope"	Kitt Wakeley	Kitt Wakeley, Starr Parodi, Jeff Eden Fair	6:16
8.	"Reprise: Message of Hope"	Kitt Wakeley	Kitt Wakeley, Starr Parodi, Jeff Eden Fair	3:25
Total length:				49:41

== Personnel ==
=== Musicians ===
- Arrangers – Kitt Wakeley (tracks: 1,2,3,4,5,6,7,8), Starr Parodi (tracks: 1,2,3,4,5,6,7,8)
- Solo Vocal – Janai Brugger (tracks: 1,2,3,4,5,6,7,8)
- Vocals – OU Women's Choir (tracks: 1,2,3,4,5,6,7,8)
- Cello – Eru Matsumoto (tracks: 1,2,3,4,5,6,7,8)
- Orchestra – Royal Philharmonic Orchestra (tracks: 1,2,3,4,5,6,7)
- Solo Vocal – Janai Brugger (tracks: 1,2,3,4,5,6,7,8)
- Trumpet – Wayne Bergeron (tracks: 1,2,3,4,5,6,7,8)
- Piano – Starr Parodi (tracks: 1,2,3,4,5,6,7,8)
- Violin – Isolde Fair (tracks: 1,2,3,4,5,6,7)
- Guitar – Jeff Eden Fair (tracks: 1,2,3,4,5,6,7,8)
- Percussion – MB Gordy (tracks: 1,2,3,4,5,6,7)
- Conductor – Nicholas Dodd (tracks: 1,2,3,4,5,6,7)

=== Technical ===
- Producers - Kitt Wakeley, Starr Parodi, Jeff Eden Fair, Melissa Wakeley
- Co-producer - Cortney Brewer, Nikki Haggard
- Engineers – Jeff Eden Fair, Eva Reistad, John Barrett, Alex Milburn, Lyndy Herd, Patrick Conlon, Christina Giacona
- Mastering - Gavin Lurssen
