= Kitt Wakeley =

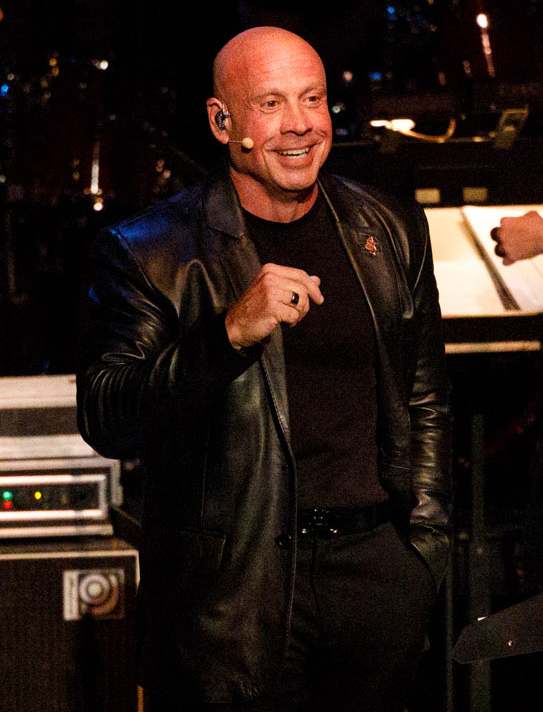
- Wakeley performing at Carnegie Hall in 2022
- Born: Memphis, Tennessee, U.S.
- Other name: AudioKaoz
- Occupations: Composer; songwriter; musician; music producer
- Years active: 1987–present
- Awards: Grammy
- Musical career
- Genres: Rock; EDM; orchestra
- Instruments: Keyboards; guitar; bass; trumpet
- Website: kittwakeley.com

Kitt Wakeley is a Grammy award-winning American composer, producer, orchestrator, arranger, and musician. He has worked with artists Aaron Lazar, Josh Groban, Sting, Royal Philharmonic Orchestra, and others. His solo album, Symphony of Sinners & Saints (featuring Joe Satriani), charted at #1 on Billboard's Classical Crossover and Classical charts as well as yielding two #1 singles. In 2023, he won a Grammy Award for "Best Classical Compendium" for An Adoption Story and was nominated in the same category in 2024 for Mythologies II. He produced Aaron Lazar's album Impossible Dream which was also nominated for a Grammy Award for "Best Traditional Pop Vocal Album" that same year as well as charting at #2 on Billboard's Classical Crossover Album chart. He was honored by the ALS Network with an Essey Spotlight Award for his production work on the album. In 2025, Wakeley won a Grammy Award for producing Alkebulan II, an album by Matt B and Royal Philharmonic Orchestra. In 2025, he was nominated for a Grammy Award for Seven Seasons for Best Classical Compendium for the 68th Annual Grammy Awards in 2026.

== Early life and education ==
Wakeley was born in Memphis, Tennessee and grew up in Holdenville, Oklahoma. He played trumpet in his elementary school band and later began playing the drums, piano, and guitar. During high school Wakeley played in several bands and received scholarship offers from state level music programs but chose to pursue a bachelor's degree in Pre-Law and Sociology and a Masters in Public Administration from East Central University in Ada, Oklahoma, where he was in the Gamma Xi Chapter of Phi Kappa Tau in 1987.

== Music career ==
Wakeley is a composer, songwriter, musician, and music producer whose genres have been classified as rock, hard rock, EDM, and orchestral. His professional career began at age 16 when he was hired to write the intro for one of Oklahoma's top radio DJ's shows. He wrote, produced, and recorded songs for the rock band Mydion. They released one album, Ashes and the Angel.

His first rock and EDM solo album, Cinematic Chaos, was released in 2013 under his pseudonym, AudioKaoz.

His third orchestral rock collection, Midnight in Macedonia (recorded in Skopje, Macedonia), featuring the Macedonian Choir and Macedonian Philharmonic Orchestra, was released in 2015.

Wakeley released his fourth solo studio album, Symphony of Sinners & Saints (featuring Joe Satriani), which was recorded at the Abbey Road Studios in London with the Royal Philharmonic and London Voices. The album peaked at #1 on Billboard's Classical Crossover and Classical charts, and at #18 on Hot Hard Rock Songs. Singles "Conflicted", "Forgive Me", and "Sinners and Saints" all peaked at #1 on Billboard as well as charting in the Top-10 Hot Hard Rock Songs chart.

The album tour included shows at Carnegie Hall, the Civic Center Music Hall in Oklahoma, and South by Southwest.

Throughout his career, Wakeley has received numerous awards for his music. At the 2019 Indie Music Awards he won awards in eight categories, including, Best New Male Artist of the Year, Best Special Live Performance, Best Instrumental Producer, Artist of The Year, and Best Instrumental Songwriter. He won, Song of the Year at the Hollywood Music in Media Awards and two Josie Music Awards in 2020 for, Songwriter of the Year and Producer of the Year. In 2021 he was inducted into the Indie Music Hall of Fame, along with winning Album of the Year for Symphony of Sinners and Saints.

In 2023, Wakeley's album, An Adoption Story, won a Grammy Award for "Best Classical Compendium". The album was recorded at Abbey Road Studios and features the London Symphony Orchestra, and Wouter Kellerman.

Wakeley was nominated for a Grammy Award for Mythologies II for "Best Classical Compendium" in 2024, as well as producing Aaron Lazar's album Impossible Dream which was nominated for "Best Traditional Pop Vocal Album" that same year. He was honored by the ALS Network with an Essey Spotlight Award for his production work on Impossible Dream in 2025 and was included in Spin magazine's "10 Rising Artists to Watch". In 2025, he was nominated for a Grammy Award for Seven Seasons for Best Classical Compendium.

== Solo discography ==
- 2013 - AudioKaoz – Cinematic Chaos
- 2014 - Mydion – Ashes and the Angel
- 2018 - Midnight in Macedonia
- 2021 - Symphony of Sinners & Saints
- 2022 - An Adoption Story
- 2025 - Seven Seasons

== Discography ==
Year	Album	Artist	Credit
2022	Never Get Away	Justine Blazer	Artist
2022	Gimme Love (Dance Remix)	Matt B featuring Eddy Kenzo	Producer, arranger, composer
2023	A Love Song	Noshir Mody	Producer
2023	A New Chapter	Vahagn Stepanyan	Producer
2023	Alkebulan	Matt B	Producer
2023	Lolo, Montana	Chuck Leah	Producer
2024	Alkebulan II	Matt B featuring Royal Philharmonic Orchestra	Producer, arranger, composer
2024	Impossible Dream	Aaron Lazar	Producer, arranger
2024	Echoes of Grace: Choral Music of Patti Drennan	Sterling Ensemble Los Angeles	Producer
2024	Abstractions	Noshir Mody	Producer
2024	Mythologies II	Danaë Xanthe Vlasse	Producer

== Billboard charts ==
Year	Work	Category	
Year	Work	Category	Billboard US
2021	Symphony of Sinners & Saints (album)	Classical Crossover	1
2021	Symphony of Sinners & Saints (album)	Classical	1
2021	Symphony of Sinners & Saints (album)	Hard Rock Albums	12
2021	Kitt Wakeley	2021 Year-End Classical Crossover Albums Artists	10
2021	"Conflicted" (featuring Joe Satriani (single)	Hard Rock Digital Sales	1
2021	"Conflicted" (featuring Joe Satriani (single)	Hot Hard Rock Songs	18
2021	"Forgive Me" (featuring Joe Satriani) (single)	Hard Rock Digital Sales	1
2021	"Sinners and Saints" (single)	Hard Rock Digital Sales	1
2022	An Adoption Story (EP)	Classical Crossover	1

== Awards ==
Year	Nominated work	Category	Award	Result
2025	Seven Seasons	Best Classical Compendium	Grammy Award	Nominated
2025	Alkebulan II	Best Global Music Album	Grammy Award	Won
2025	Impossible Dream	Producer	ALS Essey Spotlight Award	Won
2024	Mythologies II	Best Classical Compendium	Grammy Award	Nominated
2024	Various Works	Best Production/Producer	Josie Music Awards	Won
2024	Let Your Soul Be Your Pilot	Best Production/Producer	Hollywood Independent Music Awards	Nominated
2024	Let Your Soul Be Your Pilot	Best Music Production/Producer	Josie Music Award	Nominated
2023	An Adoption Story	Best Classical Compendium	Grammy Award	Won
2023	Best in Music Genre	Contemporary Classical	Hollywood Independent Music Award	Nominated
2023	An Adoption Story	EP of the Year (Male)	Josie Music Award	Won
2023	The Storm	Best Instrumental Song	Intercontinental Music Award	Won
2023	Stairway to Heaven	Best Rock Song	Intercontinental Music Award	Won
2022	Live and Recorded Sound	Outstanding Musical Ensemble	Josie Music Award	Won
2021	You Gave Me Wings	Best Instrumental Song	Hollywood Music in Media Award	Won
2021	Symphony of Sinners & Saints	Album of the Year	Josie Music Award	Won
2021		Indie Music Hall of Fame inductee	Indie Music Hall of Fame	Won
2021	Forgive Me	Instrumental Song of the Year	Hollywood Music in Media Award	Won
2021		Outstanding Stage Production	Josie Music Award	Won
2020		Musician of the Year	Josie Music Award	Won
2020	You Gave Me Wings	Best Instrumental	Hollywood Music in Media Award	Won
2019	End of my Journey	Best Gospel Song	Hollywood Music in Media Award	Won
2019	Midnight in Macedonia	Album of the Year	ISSA (Independent Singer-Songwriter Awards)	Won
2019	Closure	Best Instrumental Producer	Indie Music Channel Awards	Won
2018	Closure	Best Instrumental Producer	Indie Music Channel Awards	Won
2019	An Evening in Gotham	Best Instrumental Songwriter	Indie Music Channel Awards	Won
2019	Closure	Best Male Instrumental Artist	Indie Music Channel Awards	Won

== Personal life ==
Wakeley is married to Melissa Wakeley. They share four biological children together, and three adoptive children.
