= Genesis (Matthew Shell and Arun Shenoy song) =

- Official artwork

Single by Matthew Shell and Arun Shenoy
- Recorded: 2012–2013
- Genre: Instrumental jazz
- Label: MTS Music / Narked Records
- Songwriter(s): Ian Cameron, Matthew Shell, Arun Shenoy

Music video
- "Genesis" on YouTube

Genesis is an instrumental jazz single released by Matthew Shell and Arun Shenoy on April 25, 2013. It features the Canadian violinist Ian Cameron and guest musicians from around the world. In an interview on Hybrid Jazz by Trish Hennessey, Shenoy talks about The Violin Song (from Shenoy’s album Rumbadoodle) being an inspiration for Shell to reach out to Shenoy, for the song originally written by Shell and based on a funk piano and guitar groove. The accompanying music video was created by Jason Baustin, of Travestee Films by combining footage from the recording sessions in Armenia, India, Germany, and various locations in the U.S.

In 2014, the song was featured on the soundtrack of the documentary The Politics of Fashion: DC Unboxed

== Track listing ==
No.	Title	Writer(s)	Length
1.	"Genesis"	Ian Cameron, Matthew Shell, Arun Shenoy	4:56

== Production and Personnel ==
The following personnel were involved in the recording

- Matthew Shell - Arranger, Composer, Engineer, Mixing, Primary Artist, Producer
- Arun Shenoy - Arranger, Composer, Primary Artist
- Ian Cameron - Composer, Violin
- Vahagn Stepanyan - Keyboards, Piano
- Sebastian Wyrobisch - Drums
- Teo Lee - Bass
- Jonathan Wesley - Arranger, Keyboards, String Arrangements
- Alexander Brusencev - Drum Engineering
- Emily Lazar - Mastering
- Conrad Osipowicz - Engineer
- Jason Baustin - Editing, Video Director

== See also ==
- Arun Shenoy
- Matthew Shell
