= Alkebulan II =

Studio album by Matt B featuring Royal Philharmonic Orchestra
- Released: August 23, 2024
- Recorded: 2024
- Studio: Abbey Road Studios
- Genre: Afro-beat
- Length: 26:26
- Label: Vitae Records
- Producers: Matt B, Angela V. Benson, Kitt Wakeley, Brent Fischer, MB Gordy

Matt B featuring Royal Philharmonic Orchestra chronology
ALKEBULAN (2023)	Alkebulan II (2024)

Alkebulan II (stylized in all caps) is a studio album by American singer, songwriter, and music producer Matt B featuring Royal Philharmonic Orchestra. In 2025, the album won a Grammy Award for Best Global Music Album.

== History ==
Alkebulan II, recorded by Matt B (Matthew Benson) featuring Royal Philharmonic Orchestra, was recorded at Abbey Road Studios in 2024. During his Grammy acceptance speech Benson said, "And, to think that this journey started off from an ancestry DNA test and I found out that I was mostly Nigerian. This album was created as a way of shining a light on Africa and the beautiful culture that we from the diaspora came from." In 2025, Alkebulan II received the GRAMMY Award for Best Global Music Album, marking the first GRAMMY win for artist Matt B. The album also featured the Royal Philharmonic Orchestra, which earned its first GRAMMY Award since its founding in 1946. Additionally, two producers of Ugandan origin were recognized for their work on the album, becoming the first individuals from Uganda and the East African region to receive GRAMMY Awards. The Recording Academy highlighted the album’s recognition as a significant moment for African representation in global music.

The album's single, "NO WAHALA," written by Benson and Buguma Mark, won a Hollywood Music in Media Award for Best Song in a Short Film in 2024.

== Track listing ==
No.	Title	Writer(s)	Length
1.	"Uhambo Olungaziwa" (feat. Nomfundo Khambule)	Matthew Benson, Nomfundo Khambule	1:18
2.	"Wambile"	Matthew Benson, Matte "Tarley" Shahidu	3:41
3.	"Midnight Train"	Matthew Benson, Niwanyanya "Zigi" Johnbosco	3:02
4.	"Renewal" (feat. Nomfundo Khambule)	Matthew Benson, Nomfundo Khambule	1:20
5.	"Kholwani" (feat. Amazwi8 and Wouter Kellerman)	Matthew Benson, Monde Msutwana, Niwanyanya "Zigi" Johnbosco, James Frank,	3:52
6.	"No Wahala"	Matthew Benson, Buguma "Ghost" Mark	4:02
7.	"Intuition" (feat. Nomfundo Khambule)	Matthew Benson, Nomfundo Khambule	1:59
8.	"Lost Drums" (feat. Sekou Andrews)	Matthew Benson, Matte ‘Tarley’ Shahidu, Sekou Andrews	3:36
9.	"Purpose" (feat. Nomfundo Khambule)	Matthew Benson, Nomfundo Khambule	1:03
10.	"The Creator"	Matthew Benson, Buguma "Ghost" Mark, Kagembe "Rulz" Rajab	2:29

=== Notes ===
- All tracks are stylized in all caps.

== Personnel ==
- Matt B - primary artist, vocals, lyrics,
- Royal Philharmonic Orchestra
- Royal Philharmonic executive director - Ian McClay
- Conductor - Nicholas Dodd
- Librarian - Jill Streater
- Recordist - Dan Hayden
- MB Gordy - drums, percussion
- Walter Barnes - bass
- Timothy Muwanguzi - guitar
- James Frank - whistle
- Wouter Kellerman - flute/fife
- Matthew Benson II - piano
- Athena Benson - guitar
- Noah Benson - drums, popcorn snare
- Choir Vocalists - Amanda "Gugu" Mnguni, Babalwa "Backs" Maqungo, Uyanda Sibisi, Theto Rangala, Mpho "Mphossible" Bohloko, Bongani "Bongz" Hlengwa, Makabulele "Maka" Dukada, Lucky "Killar" Khumalo
- Choral Producer - James Frank
- Background Vocalists - Matthew Benson, Phiona Nabanja, Ugaboys, Niwanyanya “Zigi” Johnbosco, Buguma Mark, Matthew Benson II, Athena Benson, Noah Benson, Angela V. Benson, Nilotica Ensemble Troop Band, Nakayiza Evelyn

=== Production ===
- Producers - Matthew Benson, Angela V. Benson, Kitt Wakeley, Brent Fischer, MB Gordy
- Co-producers - Wabwire "B.I.T" Shedrack, Bash Killa
- Score producers - Starr Parodi, Jeff Fair
- Arrangers - Larry Ranch, Starr Parodi, Jeff Fair, Kitt Wakelely
- Orchestrators - Larry Ranch, Starr Parodi, Jeff Fair, Kitt Wakelely
- Copyists - Larry Ranch, Kitt Wakeley
- Librettist - Jill Streater

=== Technical ===
- Recording engineers - Matthew Benson, John Barrett, Lucas Fehring, Matt Brownlie
- Assistant recording engineers - Robin Walsh, Bash Killa, Wabwire "B.I.T" Shedrack, Kgala Kgafe
- Mix engineers - Marc Whitmore, Matthew Benson
- Mastering engineer - Jett Galindo
- Dolby Atmos/immersive audio engineer - Matt Sim

== Release history ==
Region	Date	Format	Label
United States	August 23, 2024	CD, digital download	Vitae Records
