= Noshir Mody =

American musician and composer

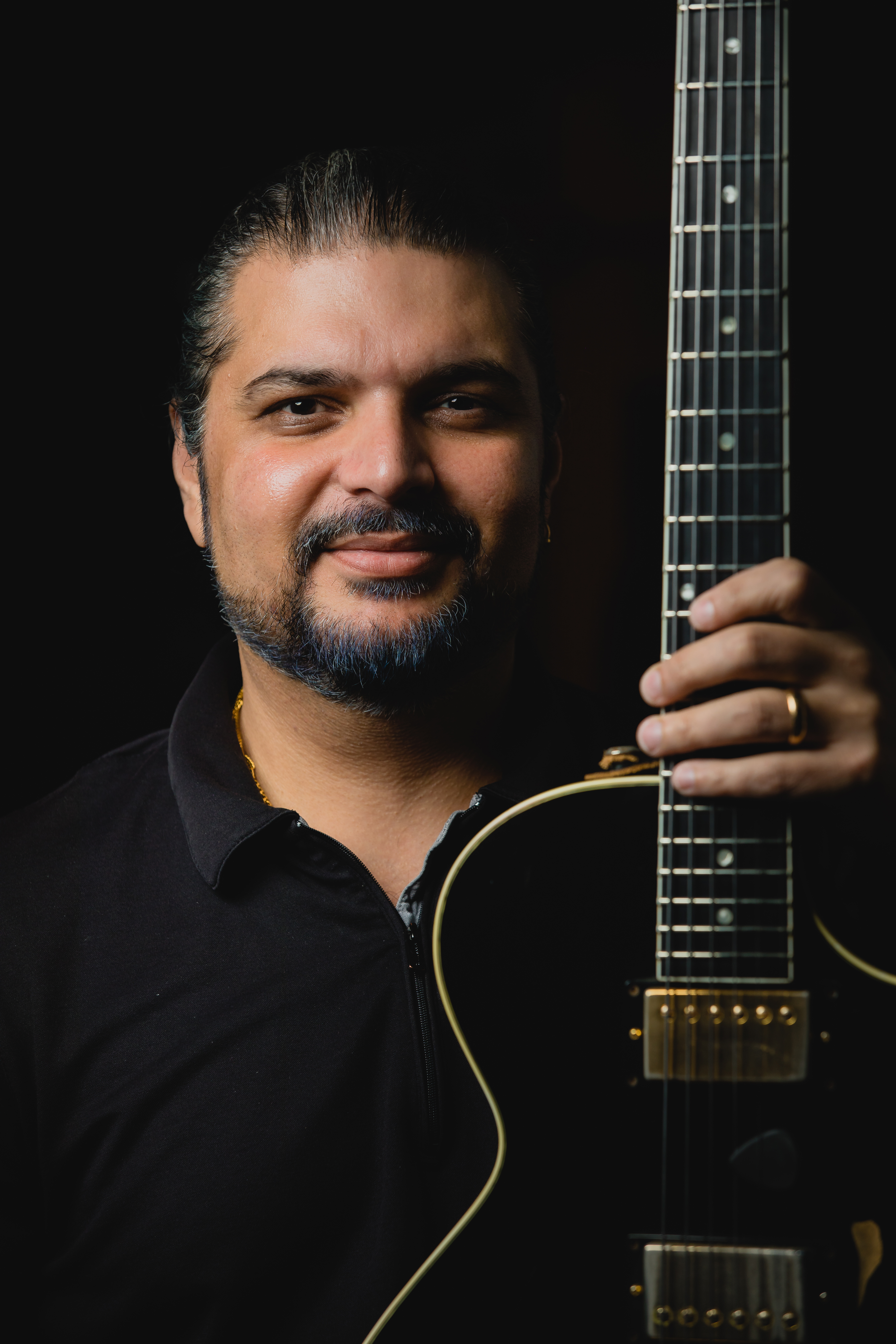
- Mody in 2020

Background information
- Born: Mumbai, India
- Genres: Contemporary jazz; jazz fusion; global music; progressive rock
- Occupations: Composer; musician; record producer
- Instruments: guitar
- Years active: 1998–present
- Website: www.noshirmody.com

Noshir Mody is an Indian American composer, musician, and record producer. His genres have been classified as jazz, progressive rock, and world music. In 2024, he was nominated for a Grammy Award and won an InterContinental Music Award.

== Biography ==
Mody was born in Mumbai, India. His father was a musician, and Noshir is a self-taught guitarist and composer. He cites Al Di Meola, Pat Metheny, Kurt Rosenwinkel, and Keith Jarrett as major influences.

In 1995, Mody moved to New York, where he began playing in small cafes and jazz clubs. Since then, he has released eight studio albums: Escape from Oblivion (2000), In This World With You (2008), Union of Hearts (2011), Stories from the Years of Living Passionately (2014), A Burgeoning Consciousness (2018), An Idealist's Handbook (2020), A Love Song (2023), Abstractions (2024), and Kashira (2024).

In 2022, Mody performed at Carnegie Hall. He has also shared the stage with artists such as Atilla Engin, Masa Takumi, and Charu Suri, as well as recording with producers Kitt Wakeley and Lonnie Park, among others.

In 2023, Mody's blues single "The Yards" was nominated for a Hollywood Independent Music Award in the Best Jazz (Smooth/Cool) category. The following year, the single won the InterContinental Music Award. Also in 2024, Mody was nominated for a Grammy Award for Best Global Music Performance for the single "Kashira" by Masa Takumi, which also featured Ron Korb and Dale Edward Chung.

== Awards ==
- 2024 – "Kashira" (single) – Best Global Music Performance – Grammy Award Nomination
- 2024 – "The Yards" (single) – Blues – InterContinental Music Award – Winner
- 2023 – "The Yards" (single) – Jazz (Smooth/Cool) – Hollywood Independent Music Award – Nomination
- 2020 – "An Idealist's Handbook: Identity, Love and Hope in America 2020" (album) – Composition/Composer, Band, and Listener Impact – Global Music Award – Winner
- 2020 – "Illusions Grow" (single) – Best Jazz Song – World Songwriting Award – Winner
- 2018 – "Forever July" (single) – John Lennon Songwriting Competition

== Discography ==
- Escape from Oblivion (2000)
- In This World With You (2008)
- Union of Hearts (2011)
- Stories from the Years of Living Passionately (2014)
- A Burgeoning Consciousness (2018)
- An Idealist's Handbook:Identity, Love and Hope in America in 2020 (2020)
- A Love Song (2023)
- Abstractions (2024)
- Kashira (2024)
