= Hidden Figures (soundtrack) =

Hidden Figures: The Album

Soundtrack album by Pharrell Williams
- Released: December 21, 2016
- Recorded: 2016
- Genres: Pop; classical; gospel
- Length: 33:07
- Labels: Columbia; i am OTHER; Sony Classical
- Producer: Pharrell Williams

Pharrell Williams chronology
The Amazing Spider-Man 2 (2014)	Hidden Figures (2016)	Despicable Me 3 (2017)

Hidden Figures: The Album is the soundtrack album consisting of 10 original songs, that accompanies the 2016 film Hidden Figures. The songs were written and produced by Pharrell Williams who scored much of the songs in late-2014. The album mostly consisted of gospel music, and featured involvement of various artists, mostly female vocalists performing the tracks, while Williams also featured as the primary artist and also accompanied the female artists in few tracks. The album was released through Williams' i am OTHER label, Columbia Records and Sony Classical Records on December 21, 2016. The album spawned five singles: "I See a Victory", "Runnin'", "Surrender", "Crave" and "Able".

== Background ==
Pharrell Williams acted as the co-producer of the film's soundtrack, and also wrote for most of the songs for the film. All of the songs were inspired from music in the 1960s since the film and its events take place during that period. The tracks were written even before the start of the production, since late-2014. Williams in a Facebook interaction with fans, said "I attempted to put something behind the music, and nothing ever really worked out. I just — nothing worked for it. Then when this project popped up it was like, 'Oh, that's what I was supposed to be doing."

The first track "Runnin'" was composed on time to shoot for the scenes. The song was inspired by the scenes of Katherine Johnson (Taraji P. Henson) having to dash across the Langley Research Center campus to the only bathroom that a black woman could use. Williams said "What must have gone through her mind? They lived in a gender-biased, racially biased matrix where the gravity was much heavier on a woman than it was on a man. So they were pulled down in a different way. But their math, and their ambition, superseded it."

Another track "I See A Victory" consisted of gospel flavor music and also replicated the "classic Southern soul, zydeco sound". Williams stated it as "one of the uplifting tracks in the album", as it served as a "soaring motivational track", but also highlighted "the early '60s with what women are going through to today". Gospel player Kim Burrell was hired to sing the track, after being insisted by singer-songwriter Kirk Franklin as replicate the "jazz inflections" in the track. The album featured prominent artists such as Mary J. Blige, Alicia Keys, Lalah Hathaway and Janelle Monáe, apart from Williams recording some of the solo tracks. Williams' songs were also used to draw in the film's score. Williams stated to Deadline saying "We wanted to make sure there was a different offering, because when you listen to most scores, the chord progressions and the melodic direction usually has a Euro or Anglo basis to it".

== Promotion and release ==
On September 10, 2016, Pharrell Williams performed all the songs at a promotional concert held at the Toronto International Film Festival, where the film's special screening was held. Along with Williams, artists who featured in the original soundtrack also performed the tracks. The same day, the song "I See a Victory" was released as a promotional single from the album. On October 20, 2016, the studio versions of the songs "Runnin'" and "Surrender" was released as the second and third single from the album. It was followed by two more singles, "Crave" and "Able" being released on November 16 and December 9. The full soundtrack was released by Columbia, i am OTHER and Sony Classical on December 21.

A track inspired from the film "Anita" was produced and performed by Smino. It was released through Smino's SoundCloud channel on March 7, 2017.

== Track listing ==
All music is composed by Pharrell Williams.

Hidden Figures: The Album
No.	Title	Writer(s)	Artist(s)	Length
1.	"Runnin'"	Pharrell Williams	Williams	3:35
2.	"Crave"	Williams	Williams	2:53
3.	"Surrender"	Williams	Lalah Hathaway; Williams	3:35
4.	"Mirage"	Williams	Mary J. Blige	3:15
5.	"Able"	Williams	Williams	3:01
6.	"Apple"	Williams; Alicia Keys	Keys; Williams	3:47
7.	"Isn't This The World"	Williams; Chad Hugo	Janelle Monáe	4:12
8.	"Crystal Clear"	Williams	Williams	2:48
9.	"Jalapeño"	Williams	Monáe; Williams	2:50
10.	"I See a Victory"	Williams; Kirk Franklin	Kim Burrell; Williams	3:07

Apart from the original songs, some of the incorporated tracks are featured in the film, while not in the soundtrack. These tracks include:

- "Sticks and Stones" – Ray Charles
- "Don't Take My Whiskey Away From Me" – Wynonie Harris
- "So What" – Miles Davis
- "Have a Good Time" – Ruth Brown
- "You Say You Love Me" – The Hearts
- "Mighty Good Lovin'" – The Miracles

== Reception ==
Bustle's Johnny Brayson said "The women featured in Hidden Figures are finally getting their moment in the sun after having their contributions to the Space Race swept under the rug for decades; and they've got some pretty great music to accompany their big arrival." Andy Kellman of AllMusic had written "Though there are contemporary production touches, everything is based in '60s pop-soul -- an unflaggingly upbeat and positive sound with bobbing horn charts, finger snaps, and gospel-style refrains galore." Litcritcpop stated the album as "worth listening to".

== Controversy ==
Kim Burrell, who worked on the film's soundtrack, was a senior pastor at the Love & Liberty Fellowship Church. She received backlash after her sermon on December 31, 2016, where she condemned homosexuality, calling it "perverted" and an "embarrassment". She further stated homosexuality was a "spirit of delusion and confusion" and "has deceived many men and women, causing a strain on the body of Christ". Her speech was condemned by several members, including Williams, Octavia Spencer, one of the film's main leads and Janelle Monáe, who also contributed two songs to the film's soundtrack.

Williams posted a message in tweet, in response to Burell's speech, saying: "I condemn hate speech of any kind. There is no room in this world for any kind of prejudice. My greatest hope is for inclusion and love for all humanity in 2017 and beyond." At the 74th Golden Globe Awards, Monáe stated:

"I've been very supportive of love, and at the end of the day, I think that no matter where you come from and who you love, you deserve to have a right to the American dream and to also have your story told ... I just think that anybody who is representing hate is a part of the problem and I hope we can learn from each other and be more empathetic of one another, and I hope we can all remember that at the end of the day we all bleed the same color."

The film's promotion at The Ellen DeGeneres Show, was affected as the show host Ellen DeGeneres cancelled Burell's appearance, following her statements, where she was intended to sing a duet on one of the songs. Instead, the show went on with Williams making an appearance.

== Accolades ==
Award/Festival	Date of ceremony	Category	Recipient(s)	Result	Ref.
African-American Film Critics Association	February 8, 2017	Best Song	"I See Victory"	Won	
Black Reel Awards	February 16, 2017	Outstanding Original Song	"Surrender" – Lalah Hathaway and Pharrell Williams	Nominated	
Grammy Awards	January 28, 2018	Best Compilation Soundtrack for Visual Media	Hidden Figures: The Album – Pharrell Williams	Nominated	
Hollywood Music in Media Awards	November 17, 2016	Best Song – Feature Film	"Running" – Pharrell Williams	Nominated	
Houston Film Critics Society	January 6, 2017	Best Original Song	"Running" – Pharrell Williams	Nominated	
NAACP Image Awards	February 11, 2017	Outstanding Song	"I See Victory" – Kim Burrell and Pharrell Williams	Won	
Satellite Awards	February 19, 2017	Best Original Song	"Running" – Pharrell Williams	Nominated	

== Personnel ==
Credits adapted from Allmusic

- Producer – Pharrell Williams
- Music supervisor – Anton Monsted
- Mastering – Tom Coyne
- Mixing – Mick Guzauski
- Music arrangements – Mike Larson
- Music editing – Mike Larson
- Vocal arrangements – Kirk Franklin
- Recording engineers – Ben Sedano, Eric Eylands, Eric Weaver, Esteban Kralj, John Cranfield, Martin Giraldo, Funai Costa, Ward Kuykendall, David Kim, Andrew Coleman, Mike Larson, Tre Nagella, Dustin Higgins, Adam Harr, Eelco Bakker, Jordan Silva, Marcel Walvisch, Mike Ott, Ben Zushi-Rhodes, Ramon Rivas
- Additional vocals – Angel Robinson, Andrea "Munchie" Simmons, Chelsea West, Darian Yancey, Deonis Cook, Michael Bethany, Myron Butler, Niya Cotton, Rhea Dummett, Whitney Jackson, Ai Shimatsu, Ambrya Underwood, Aye Hasegawa, Christina Chandler, Helen Williams, Mette Towley, Aaron Encinas, Alex Isley, Anthony Evans, Asaleana Elliott, Brandon Winbush, Chavonne Stewart, Kenyon Dixon, Missi Hale, Nicole Leonti, Shanika Bereal
- Musicians:
  - Alto Saxophone – Jesse McGinty
  - Electric guitar – Brent Paschke
  - Horns – Arturo Sandoval
- A&R – Mark Williams, Jerry Edouard, Mike Larson
- Coordinator – Joann Orgel
- Executive producer – Pharrell Williams, Mimi Valdés
- Executive in-charge of music – Danielle Diego
- Business affairs – Tom Cavanaugh
- Music clearance – Ellen Ginsburg, Jessie Roberts
- Music management – Johnny Choi
- Executive management – Cynthia "Cactus" Lu*, Hana "Prana" Hollinger*, Jenn Yin
- Artist management – Caron Veazey, Ron Laffitte
- Publicity – Amanda Silverman
- Music production supervisor – Rebecca Morellato
- CCO – Mimi Valdés
- Creative director – Phi Hollinger
- Head of special projects – Loic Villepontoux
- Project manager – Alexandra Depersia
