= Vahagn Stepanyan =

Armenian composer and producer (born 1985)

- Born: Vahagn Stepanyan; July 10, 1985 (age 41)
- Occupations: Music producer; music arranger; songwriter; film/TV composer; musician
- Years active: 2014–present
- Musical career
- Genres: Instrumental; jazz fusion; gospel; pop; funk; R&B
- Website: vahagnstepanyan.com

Vahagn Stepanyan is an Armenian music producer, music arranger, songwriter, film/TV composer, and musician whose genres have been classified as jazz, R&B, funk, fusion, pop, gospel, and film score music. His album A New Chapter charted at #5 on Billboard's Contemporary Jazz Charts and at #19 on Billboard's Jazz Charts. He has shared the stage with artists including Sheila E., and has collaborated with Ricky Kej, Kitt Wakeley, Nathan East, Eric Marienthal, Henrik Linder, Greg Howe, Dave Koz, Mark Lettieri, Arun Shenoy, and Adam Hawley.

== Career ==
Stepanyan is a classically trained keyboard player, songwriter, composer, arranger, and producer. He began playing piano when he was 10 years old. He later performed in jazz clubs and wrote songs for Armenian artists. He relocated to Los Angeles to pursue his music career. His single "Motion" won the Hollywood Independent Music Award in the Jazz (Fusion/Bebop) category, and he was nominated for Musician of the Year by the Josie Music Awards.

Vahagn released his first album, Moonlight, in 2015, which received favorable reviews. His sophomore release, A New Chapter, charted at #5 on Billboard's Contemporary Jazz Charts and at #19 on Billboard's Jazz Charts, and received favorable reviews. The album features Dave Koz and is co-produced by Stepanyan and Kitt Wakeley.

He composed and arranged the music for the Armenian documentaries The Glance of Ararat and The Faces of War, as well as providing additional engineering and keyboards on Kitt Wakeley's Grammy-winning album, An Adoption Story. He was featured on the single "Gravity" with the Groove Project, which includes musicians Arun Shenoy, Lonnie Park, and Matthew Shell.

Stepanyan performed on the Hope Anthology Project, whose proceeds went to the GMA Foundation's Disaster Assistance Fund, which financially aided musicians, stage hands, and crew who were affected by COVID-19. The project featured Mary J. Blige, Maranda Curtis, Fred Hammond, and Percy Bady. In 2023, Stepanyan performed live at the NAMM Show.

== Awards ==
Year	Nominated work	Category	Award	Result
2023	A New Chapter	Best Album/Best Instrumental Album	Global Music Awards	Won
2023	"Motion"	Jazz (Fusion/Bebop)	Hollywood Independent Music Awards	Won
2023	Vahagn Stepanyan	Musician of the Year (Piano/Keys)	Josie Music Awards	Nominated
2021	"Motion"	Silver Medal (Jazz Fusion)	Global Music Awards	Won
