= Elivava =

- Also known as: Elivava The African Gold
- Born: Tina Mensah; February 20, 1976 (age 50); New Baika, Ghana
- Genres: Afro Pop; Afro Rock; Afro Beat; Afro Jazz; Neo Soul
- Occupations: Singer; Song writer
- Years active: 2005–present
- Label: Elivava Productions
- Website: elivava.com

Tina Mensah (born February 20, 1976), better known by her stage name Elivava The African Gold (or Elivava for short), is a Ghanaian singer Performer, songwriter and choreographer. She is a native of New Baika/Old Baika in the Buem District of Oti Region in Ghana, West Africa.

== Background history ==
In her early career, she worked as a backing vocalist with Rocky Dawuni, Kojo Antwi, Samini, VIP, and others. Her first solo performance was at Fête de la Musique, held at Alliance Française – Ghana in 2005. Elivava is managed by her own management recording company, Elivava Productions, and writes her own music.

She sings in several languages including Ewe, Ga and Twi. Others include English, French and German.

== Albums ==
- I Live 4Ever

== Influences ==
Elivava was influenced by the works of vocalist and performer Miriam Makeba and Billie Holiday.
