= Renaissance Youth Center =

Nonprofit in New York City, New York, US

- Industry: Nonprofit
- Founded: 2001
- Headquarters: South Bronx, New York, United States
- Area served: Bronx and New York City
- Key people: Bervin Harris, Darren Quinlan
- Revenue: $1.2 million
- Website: www.renaissanceyouth.org

The Renaissance Youth Center is a Bronx-based nonprofit founded in 2001. Renaissance has more than 30 public schools in New York City. The Renaissance Youth Center offers programs in education, music, sports, and civic engagement.

== History ==
It was founded in 2001 as Renaissance Education, Music, and Sports (Renaissance-EMS).

Renaissance was co-founded by Bervin Harris and Darren Quinlan to serve the Bronx's Morrisania neighborhood. Harris was a former recording artist with Capitol Records, while Quinlan was a former NCAA Division I college basketball player at St. Bonaventure University, as well as a songwriter who won the 1992 Abe Olman Scholarship from the Songwriters Hall of Fame.

== Programs ==
=== Music On Wheels ===
Music On Wheels planned a curriculum for schools that no longer have music programs for more than 30 public schools in New York City. Renaissance holds an annual Music On Wheels Recital.

=== Music With A Message Band ===
The Music With A Message Band is a 25-member performance group, aged 6–21, that write songs about social issues and perform throughout New York City. The band has performed at Good Morning America, Carnegie Hall, the Women in the World Summit at Lincoln Center, the Apollo Theater, the New School, and the City Parks Foundation. In 2016, they opened Mayor Bill de Blasio's 2016 State of the City address at the Lehman Center for the Performing Arts.

In 2018, the band performed with Robin Roberts on Good Morning America, and in 2019, they performed a cover of Lupita Nyong'o's "Sulwe's Song" with Lupita Nyong'o.

=== Renaissance Youth Council ===
In 2014, Renaissance's Youth Council spent eight hours painting Unity Park a pink salmon color. The NYC Parks Department painted over it because the youth group only allowed them to use a gray color. After months of discussions, Renaissance partnered with the Parks Department to repaint the park.

In 2016, the Youth Council set up a petition, gaining 4,700 signatures and support from New York State Assembly member Michael Blake, to force the clean-up of animal carcasses and the odor.

In 2018, Renaissance Youth Council launched Youth Connect: Journey 2 Unity Tour, a five-borough tour. The finale in Mullaly Park drew support from New York City Parks Department Commissioner Mitchell Silver and New York City Council member Vanessa Gibson.

== Awards and recognition ==
- In 2013, the Berklee College of Music included Renaissance in its Berklee City Music Network, grading the Renaissance Music Program at 94/100.
- In 2016, Renaissance co-founder Bervin Harris was honored by the New York City Police Foundation for his work as a community partner with the 42nd Precinct.
- In 2017, Rite Aid awarded Mr. Harris its inaugural KIDCHAMP Award.
- In 2017, Congressman Jose Serrano and New York State Senator Jose Serrano honored Mr. Harris with an award for Black History Month.
