= Matt B =

American musician (born 1989)

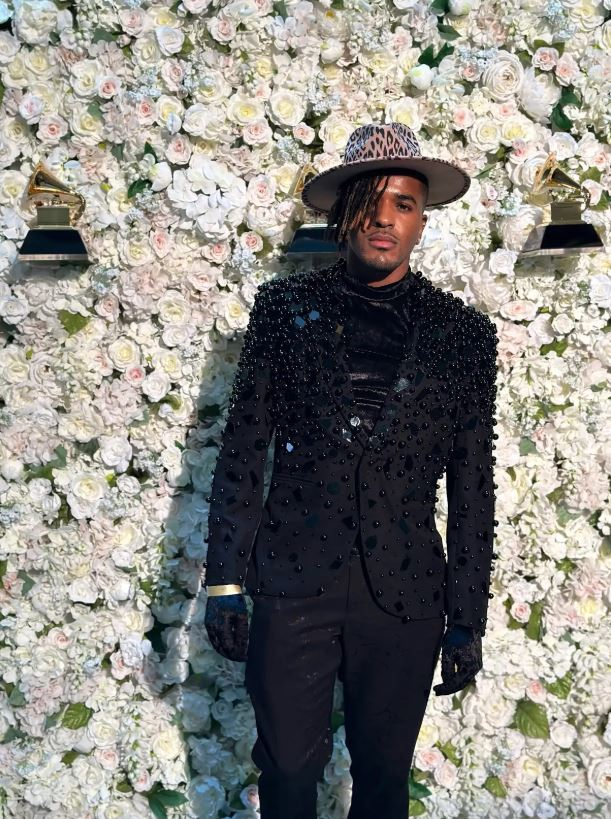
- Born: Matthew David Benson
- Education: University of Illinois at Chicago
- Occupations: Singer; songwriter; record producer
- Years active: 2004–present
- Spouse: Angela Benson (m. 2012)
- Awards: Grammy Award
- Musical career
- Genres: R&B; Hip hop; Afrobeats
- Instruments: Vocals; keyboards
- Labels: Priority Records; StarBase Records; Vitae Records
- Website: mattbworld.com

Matthew David Benson, better known by his stage name Matt B, is an American singer, songwriter, musician, and record producer. In 2022, Benson's, Gimme Love (Matt B featuring Eddy Kenzo), was nominated for a Grammy Award for Best Global Music Performance and charted at Number 36 on Billboard's US Afrobeats Songs chart. In 2025, he won a Grammy Award for "Best Global Music Album" for ALKEBULAN II.

== Music ==
Matt B began his solo career in 2009 and has released six studio albums. His genres have been generally classified as R&B, Hip hop, and Afrobeats. In 2019, Benson performed at the Magnificent Mile Lights Festival, which was nationally televised. In 2022, he was nominated for a Grammy Award for his single, Gimme Love, which features Eddy Kenzo.

Love and War was released and distributed by Tokyo-based, StarBase Records in 2014.

Dive, Benson's self-produced sophomore album was released in 2016. The album charted at #1 on iTunes R&B Chart in Japan.

Benson teamed up with producer, Bryan-Michael Cox and recorded the EP, RISE, which was distributed by Priority Records in 2018. His single, Losing You, earned him Best R&B Male Artist at the Indie Music Channel Awards.

In 2021, Benson released his US debut album, Eden, produced by Bryan-Michael Cox and Tricky Stewart, which received favorable reviews and charted on Billboard's Top 40 R&B Albums. The album's single, Deep received favorable reviews.

- Gimme Love

In 2021, Benson teamed up with Ugandan recording artist Eddy Kenzo and co-wrote and recorded, Gimme Love. In 2022, the single was nominated for a Grammy Award for Best Global Music Performance as well as charting at #36 on Billboard's US Afrobeats Songs chart.

The single's music video won numerous awards at film festivals including winning Best Song at the New York International Film Festival as well as his wife and manager, Angela Valarie Benson winning an award for the single's music video, which she directed. Benson and Kenzo performed, Gimme Love at the Eddy Kenzo Festival at Kololo Airstrip in Uganda to an audience of over 100,000, including Uganda's Prime Minister Robinah Nabbanja.

- ALKEBULAN II

In 2025, Benson received the GRAMMY Award for Best Global Music Album for ALKEBULAN II, marking his first GRAMMY win. The album also featured the Royal Philharmonic Orchestra, which received its first GRAMMY Award since its founding in 1946. The award also recognized two producers of Ugandan origin who contributed to the project, marking the first GRAMMY wins for individuals from Uganda and the East African region. The Recording Academy noted the achievement as a significant moment for African representation in global music. In that same year he was recognized by the Recording Academy in an article titled, "7 Black Creatives Making An Impact At The Recording Academy & Beyond," for advocating to protect the rights of music creators and meeting yearly with members of Congress to discuss current laws and how they impact the music community.

== Awards ==
Year	Nominated work	Category	Award	Result
2026	At The End of the Door	Best Song - Short Film	Hollywood Music in Media Award	Nominated
2025	ALKEBULAN II	Best Global Music Album	Grammy Award	Won
2024	Need Some Wine	Afrobeats/Afropop	Hollywood Independent Music Award	Nominated
2023	Gunjale	Music Video (Independent)	Hollywood Music in Media Awards	Won
2023	Best in Genre	Best Vocal (Male)	Hollywood Independent Music Award	Nominated
2022	Gimme Love	Best Global Music Performance	Grammy Award	Nominated
2022	Losing You	Best Male R&B Artist	Indie Music Channel Award	Won
2022	Gimme Love	Best Special Video	Indie Music Channel Award	Won
2022	Gimme Love	Best Song	Oniros Film Awards	Won
2022	Gimme Love	Best Song	New York International Film Award	Won
2022	Gimme Love	Best Male Vocal, Male Artist, Music Video, Best Song, Best Rhythm & Blues	LIT Talent Award	Won

== Discography ==
- 2011 - Matt B:301B
- 2014 - Love & War
- 2016 -Dive
- 2018 - RISE
- 2019 - Homecoming
- 2021 - Eden
- 2023 - ALKEBULAN
- 2024 - ALKEBULAN II
- 2026 - ALKEBULAN III: The Water Remembers
