= Gimme Love (Matt B and Eddy Kenzo song) =

Single by Matt B featuring Eddy Kenzo
- Released: March 4, 2022
- Recorded: October 2021
- Studio: The Record Ship
- Genre: Afrobeats
- Length: 2:40
- Label: Vitae Records
- Songwriters: Matt B; Eddy Kenzo
- Producers: Angela Benson; Greg Scelsa; Steyn

"Gimme Love" is a Grammy-nominated song written and recorded by Matt B and Ugandan artist, Eddy Kenzo. The single was recorded by Matt B and Kenzo in October 2021 and was issued as a single on March 4, 2022, internationally. The song peaked at number 36 on the Billboard US Afrobeats Songs chart in November 2022. On the Viba Hot 100, Uganda's official singles chart, it peaked at number ten. "Gimme Love" was nominated for a Grammy Award for Best Global Music Performance in 2022.

Matt B and Kenzo performed "Gimme Love" at the Eddy Kenzo Festival at Kololo Airstrip in Uganda to an audience of over 20,000, including Uganda's Prime Minister Robinah Nabbanja.

== Background ==
Matt B wanted to create an Afrobeats EP and reached out to various African artists to collaborate with. Eddy Kenzo was one of the first artists that he contacted. They later met up in the recording studio and wrote and recorded, Gimme Love. The single was produced by Angela Benson, Greg Scelsa, and Steyn. It was recorded in English and Luganda and released on Vitae Records. A dance remix of "Gimme Love" was released in 2022.

== Reception ==
"Gimme Love" received favorable reviews and was nominated for a Grammy Award for Best Global Music Performance in 2022. The nomination was the first for Matt B as well as Kenzo.

The single charted at number 36 on Billboard's Afrobeats chart and number 10 on Uganda's official singles chart. The single's music video won numerous awards at film festivals including Best Song at the New York International Film Festival and Best Music Video. Matt B's wife, producer, and manager, Angela Benson co-directed the video with videographer Steven 'PhillyFlyBoy' Phillip.

== Charts ==
Chart (2022)	Peak position
Uganda Hot 100	10
US Afrobeats	36

== Awards ==
Year	Nominated work	Category	Award	Result
2022	"Gimme Love"	Best Global Music Performance	Grammy Award	Nominated
2022	"Gimme Love"	Best Special Video	Indie Music Channel Award	Won
2022	"Gimme Love"	Best Song	Oniros Film Awards	Won
2022	"Gimme Love"	Best Song, Best Music Video	New York International Film Award	Won
2022	"Gimme Love"	Best Song, Best Rhythm & Blues, Best Male Vocal, Male Artist, Music Video	LIT Talent Award	Won

== Personnel ==
- Matt B – lead vocals
- Eddy Kenzo – lead vocals
- Steyn – all instrumentation
- Angela Valarie Benson – producer
- Greg Scelsa – producer
- Steyn – producer
- Mack Woodward – mix/mastering engineer
- Charles 'Babi' Kouassi – recording engineer
