= Chris Xaver =

Chris Xaver (born Christine Marie Spitzbart on October 14, 1966) is a radio and television personality, best known for her PBS show The Sweet Life with Chris Xaver. Xaver was a professor at Tompkins Cortland Community College.

== Career ==
=== Television and radio ===
Xaver began working in media at 18, when she studied at Tidewater Broadcasting School in Norfolk, Virginia. Chris has worked at a number of radio and television stations. She was a WSTM-TV reporter, a fill-in announcer for WNTQ, and has worked at a variety of other stations including WDDY, NewsCenter 7, and WCNY. These positions included disc jockey, reporter, anchor, and cooking show host.

Xaver’s most significant project is the cooking show The Sweet Life with Chris Xaver. This show airs nationally on participating PBS stations. Xaver’s show focuses transforming traditional recipes into healthier, sugar free recipes for people watching their weight or their blood sugar levels.

=== Academic ===
Xaver is a professor and chair of the Communications and Media Arts programs at Tompkins Cortland Community College in Dryden, New York.

== Personal life ==
Xaver was born in Woodstock, Illinois. Xaver earned a bachelor's degree in Broadcast Journalism from the S. I. Newhouse School of Public Communications at Syracuse University, an M.A. in Political Science from Maxwell School of Citizenship and Public Affairs at Syracuse University, and a PhD in Leadership in Higher Education from Capella University. She is also a StrengthsQuest trainer, which is part of a special training program run by the Gallup Organization.

Xaver was in Thailand in 2004 and injured in the tsunami. She was interviewed for the NY Times, Fox News and The Montel Williams Show regarding her experiences during that disaster. Xaver has one son.
