= Arun Shenoy =

Indian-born Singaporean musician and songwriter (born 1978)

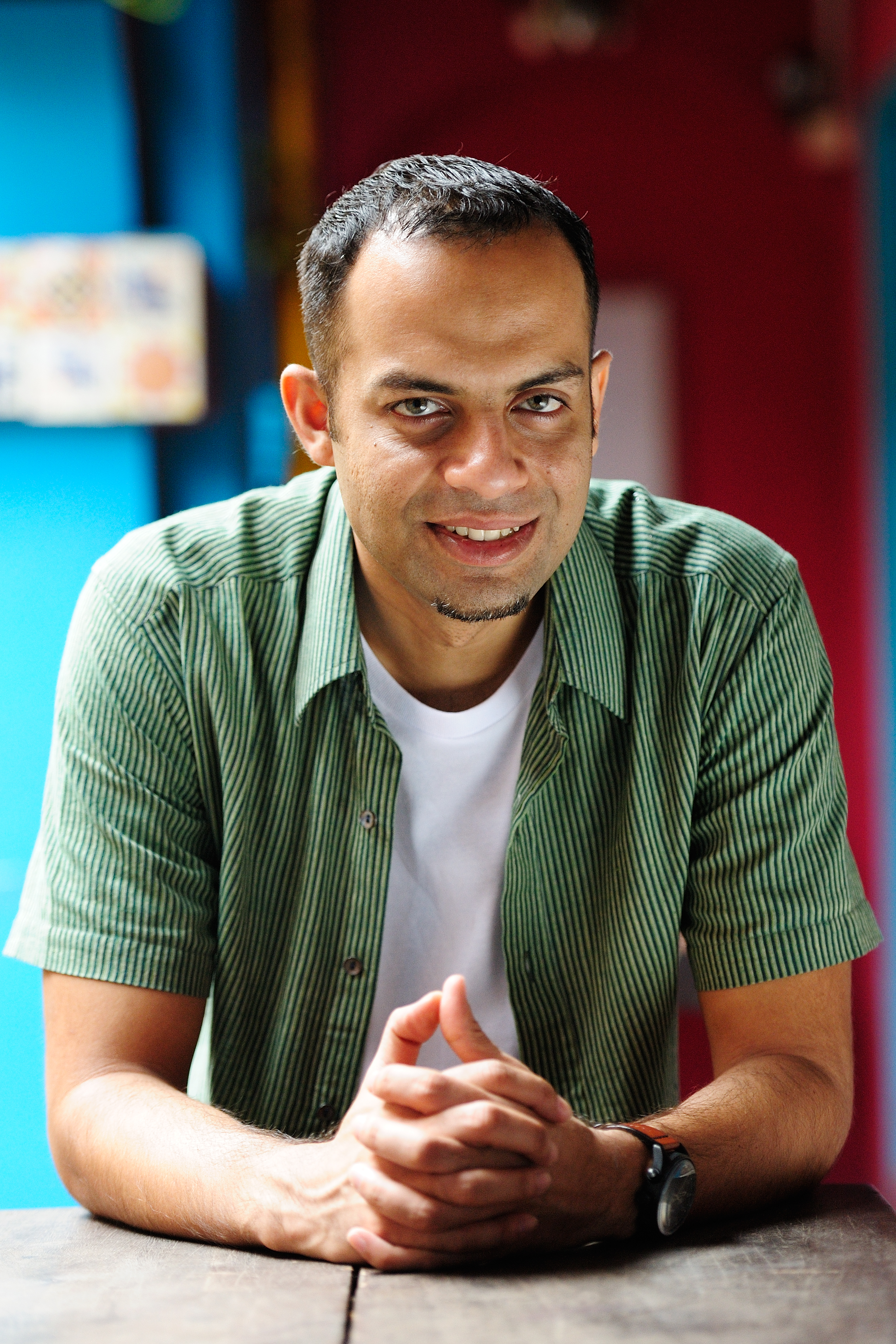
- Born: 30 April 1978 (age 48); Manipal, India
- Citizenship: Singapore
- Occupations: Recording Artist; Producer; Composer; Arranger
- Years active: 2010–present
- Musical career
- Genres: Rock; smooth jazz; jazz funk; world; singer-songwriter
- Instrument: Guitar
- Label: Narked Records
- Website: www.arunshenoy.com

Arun Shenoy (born 30 April 1978) is an Indian-Singaporean musician and songwriter. He is best known for his Grammy Award nomination at the 55th Annual Grammy Awards for his debut full-length studio album Rumbadoodle released in 2012. "Bliss", the first song from his Indian Fusion project released as a single in 2013 was featured on a worldwide Exclusive First Look on Grammy.com. His second album A Stagey Bank Affair, released in 2016 was chosen as the Critics's Pick for Best Album of the Year by Jazziz Magazine. He was conferred the Outstanding Computing Alumni Award by the School of Computing at NUS in 2018 and is also a Distinguished Alumni of MIT, Manipal. He is the founder of record label, Narked Records. Looking back at Shenoy's music over the years, music critic Jonathan Widran has noted that Shenoy's discography may sound a bit scattered, but it's reflective of a brilliant, multi-faceted creative mind, pushed relentlessly by a restless spirit. He has stated that (band) name shifts aside, it's some of the most compelling, heartfelt and life affirming music he has heard. Shenoy has been featured by Zen Magazine in the best dressed couples list at the 56th Annual Grammy Awards red carpet arrivals in 2014; and again by Le Guide Noir at the 57th Annual Grammy Awards red carpet arrivals in 2015.

== Early life ==
Shenoy was born in 1978 at Manipal in coastal Karnataka. He did his schooling at The Frank Anthony Public School, Bangalore from 1982 to 1993 followed by his pre-university education at St Joseph's Arts and Science College, Bangalore, from 1993 to 1995. Shenoy returned to Manipal for his engineering degree at the Manipal Institute of Technology (MIT, Manipal) and graduated in 1999. Shenoy moved to Singapore in 2003 pursue his master's degree by research in Computation Audio from the National University of Singapore (NUS). He became a Singapore citizen in 2008.

== Music career ==
Shenoy has been involved in the local music scene through his university days. His professional music debut as a record producer came when he worked on the production for an EP by the American hard rock artist Tanadra released on 29 April 2010. Later in the same year, Shenoy also released a solo EP on 31 October 2010, which was titled Sol. While attempting to start a career in music, Shenoy said that he worked up to 80 hours a week for 2 years, while producing his debut EP Sol and working with the American artist Tanadra on her solo debut.

Shenoy's full-length debut studio album Rumbadoodle was recorded across the world over two years and was released on 30 August 2012. The album has a flamenco feel with fusion influences drawn from contemporary pop, rock and jazz. Though he hails from a rock music background, Shenoy has said he always loved the Spanish Flamenco for its energy and passion characterized by its flourishes, rhythms and staccato style. Shenoy has cited Yanni as a major inspiration for the album. The album consists of 11 songs, which are individually named by a wide range of styles that are integrated into every song. Shenoy contributes all the proceeds from the album to an education fund for underprivileged people in India. The Art Directors of the album included Roshni Mohapatra, who was also Shenoy's wife. On 5 December 2012, Shenoy was announced as a nominee for a Grammy Award at the 55th Annual Grammy Awards in the category of Best Pop Instrumental Album for the album. He has been noted as a first time nominee alongside other first time nominees in the Pop Field Fun., Carly Rae Jepsen, Gotye and Kimbra, and also among the more than 80 nominees who hail from outside U.S. borders.

"Bliss", Shenoyʼs follow-up single from his Indian World Fusion project was launched by the Recording Academy via a Worldwide Exclusive First Look at Grammy.com in 2013. The project explores the rich lexicon of Indian classical instrumentation conceptually steeped in ancient Hindu scriptures and mythology in what Shenoy describes as a "long journey back to his own cultural roots." The song also features Grammy nominated arranger Don Hart and Indian flautist Ravichandra Kulur. The animated video for the music was scripted by art directors Roshni Mohapatra and Robert Capria and created by Actuality Films in New York.

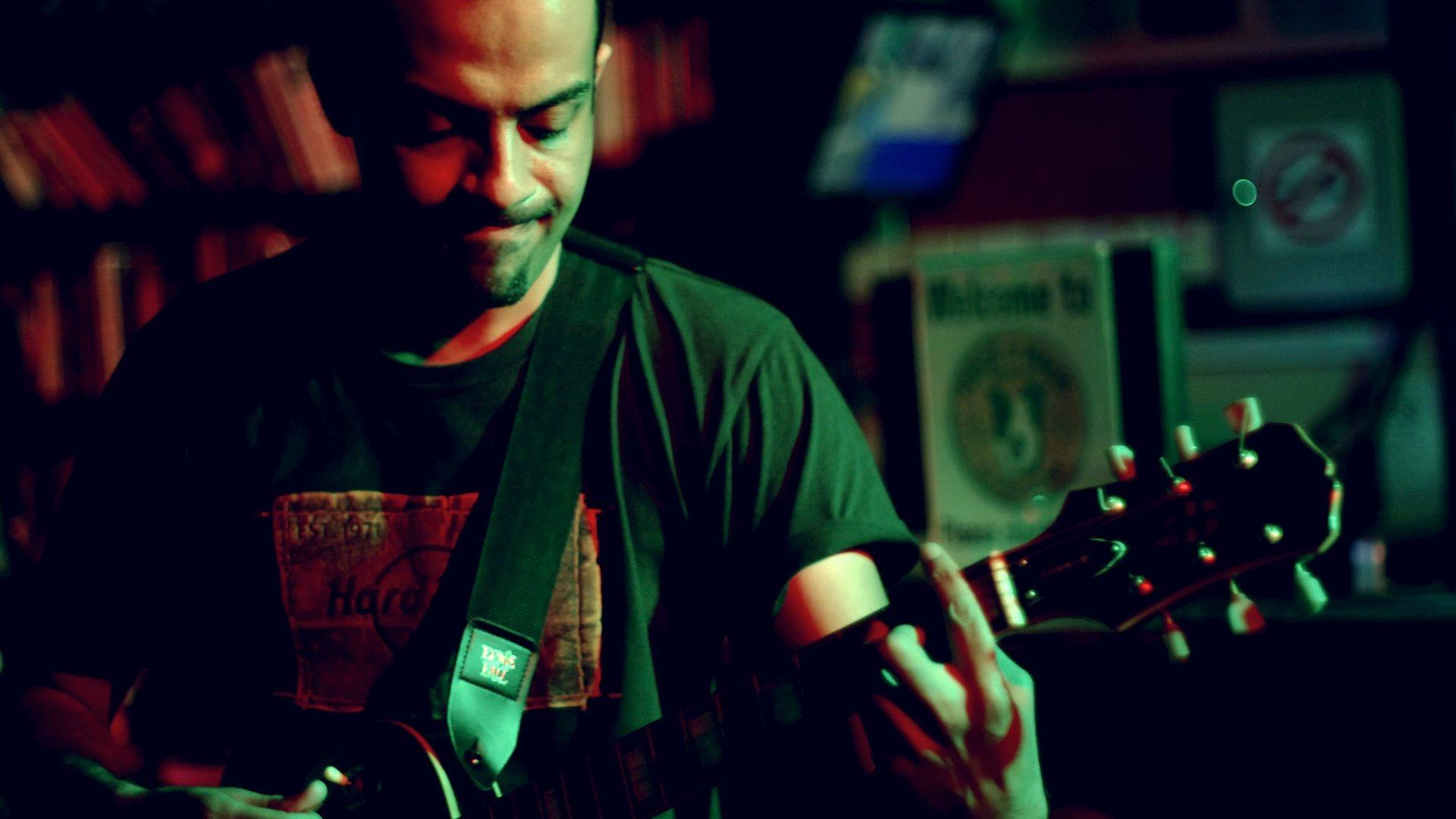
Shenoy performing live with Sridhar at the Prince of Wales, Singapore in April 2011

Shenoy has also collaborated with American producer Matthew Shell on a jazz instrumental single titled "Genesis" in 2013.

In 2014, Shenoy announced a collaboration with Berlin-based producer Sridhar. Branded as Sridhar & Arun Shenoy, the first single by the duo titled "Make Up Your Mind Or Leave It Behind" was released on 7 May 2014 and featured Lonnie Park on guest lead vocals. The follow-up single titled "Illusion" was released on 5 August 2014.

Later in the year, Shenoy announced the formation of a new band Soul'd, a trio of Shenoy on guitar, Ravichandra Kulur on flute and Duke Purisima on bass The band released their first single as a self-titled debut on 5 September 2014. The style of music has been referred to as 'Bansuri Funk'. It has been noted that Kulur's performance on the flute is fast and melodic with influences of jazz, yet rooted in the Indian traditional style.

On 1 July 2016, Shenoy released A Stagey Bank Affair, his second album and his first as a collaboration with The Groove Project, a group that consists of 13 other artists. The album is a concept album in the musical style of 'Bansuri Funk' that in addition to featuring 14 primary musicians in the group, also features a four-person horn section and nine person string section. The most prominent performer on the album is Indian flutist Ravichandra Kulur who provides the emotional core of the songs. There is also a guest appearance by keyboard player, Uziel on the opening track. The performances by Kulur on the flute and Purisima on the bass were two key elements that have served as an inspiration for the music on the album. Most of the songs on the album starting off as jams between Kulur and Shenoy.

The title of the album makes a reference to Stagey Bank Fair, an agricultural based affair held in the early 20th century at Stagshaw Bank in Northern England. As Shenoy explains, legend has it that, over the years, the farming aspect dwindled and the fair became notoriously associated with gambling and drinking. After it was discontinued in the 1920s, the phrase 'Stagey Bank Fair' became a common euphemism for 'mess'. The title is a metaphor for a place that was once a joyous fair, but is now a disheveled, chaotic experience, kind of like adulthood can be.

The mix of contemporary jazz, funky soul and manic world music is complemented by the CD's old-school carnival themed artwork, which serves to reinforce the record's loss of innocence theme. The music and visuals combine to represent the childlike wonder that remains in some adults, despite life's inherent sadness and chaotic nature.

The visual aesthetic used for the fairground concept, presented in the format of vintage poster illustrations, was conceived by art directors Roshni Mohapatra and Robert Capria The album physical package includes a 20-page booklet with 10 retro-styled carnival art panels, a second 24-page booklet with additional artwork and anecdotes, as well as 6 more images on the album package and 2 animated music videos.

Another facet of the album theme is that of the sad clown, where Shenoy counters the lighthearted tunes with the darker track of the same name "Sad Clown" that taps deepest into the loss of innocence theme. Images of the sad clown passed around drunk amid the revelry around him appear several times in the artwork. Shenoy has said that laughter and misery becomes the balance-beam on which our existence is constantly weighed. The album is a journey of the sad clown, who goes through the randomness of being in a colorful fairground, which is life.

2 singles from the album have been released to date. "Sugar Free (feat. Uziel)" on 3 June 2016 and "Mary Go Around" on 1 March 2017 The album was chosen as the Critics's Pick for Best Album of the Year by Jazziz Magazine.

Shenoy collaborated with singer-songwriter, Elizabeth Butler on an American roots song titled "If I Knew" that was released on 1 July 2017.

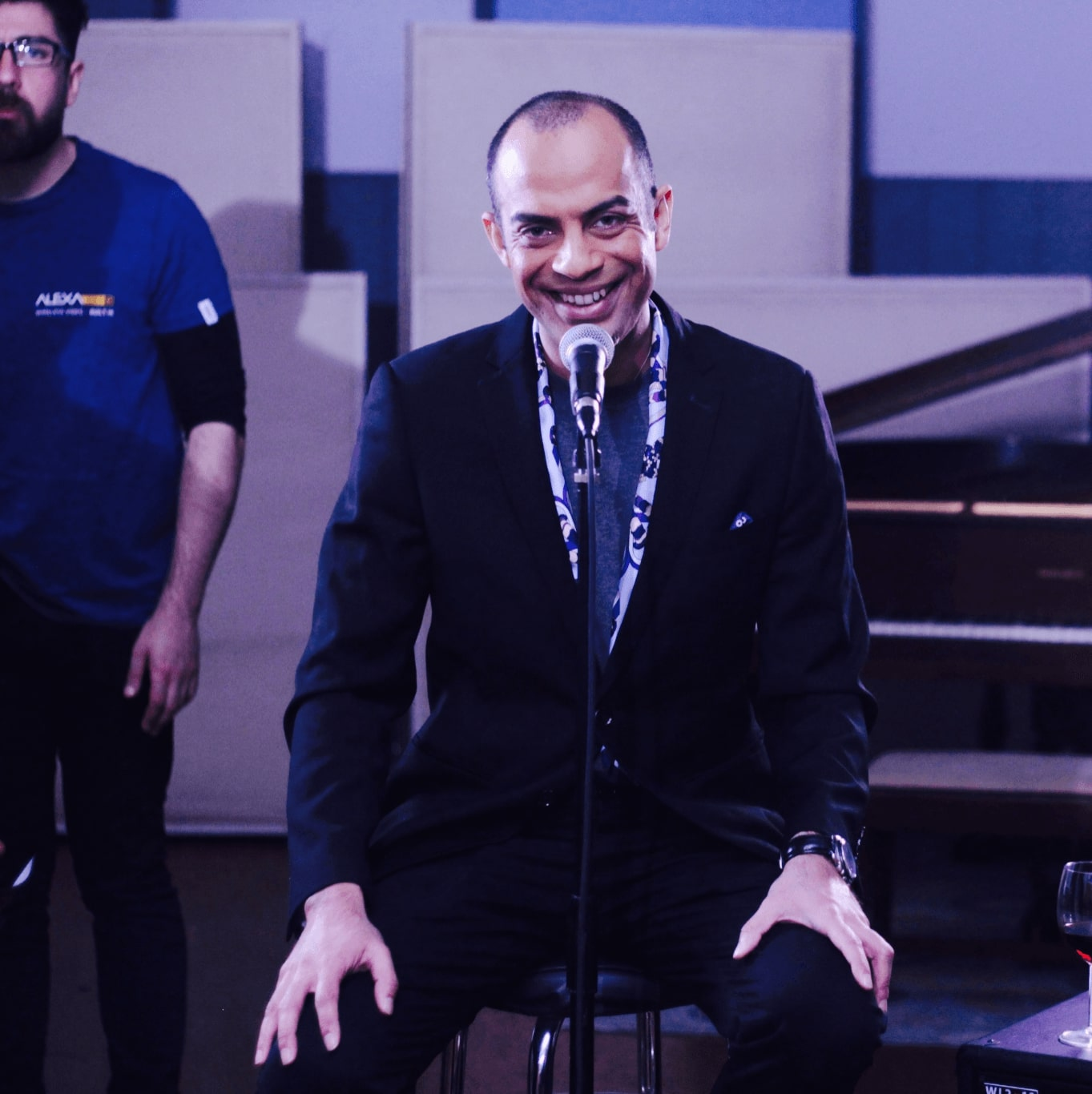
Shenoy on the sets of a music video shoot at Airship Laboratories at Richmond, California in February 2018

On 30 August 2018, Shenoy released a 5 track singer-songwriter acoustic EP titled The Unplugged Songwriter Sessions, as a musical collaboration with the core team from The Groove Project, most notably, the rhythm section of bassist Duke Purisima and drummer Jerry Chua, and the addition of a few former and a few new musical collaborators. In the group named Arun Shenoy & The Maverick Express, Shenoy takes on the duties of vocalist along with Lonnie Park. Shenoy has explained in the liner notes the music was written during an extended phase dealing with difficult personal issues. It has been noted that these tunes showcase a more fragile, vulnerable, softer side of the singer's personality, in great contrast to the muscular intensity of his earlier work; and that the album features the guitarist's lushly melodic melodies, simple yet thoughtful lyrics and surprisingly graceful vocals. With an intimate approach to the music, Shenoy has been credited with being a deft storyteller, incorporating a great amount of detail into the singular whole and that by far the true heart and soul of the collection comes from Arun Shenoy's emotive vocals that nicely ties everything together. Stylistically the group goes for a soothing chamber pop approach, with classical, jazz, and worldly influences woven into a colorful tapestry of sound.

In 2019, Shenoy changed the lineup of The Groove Project into a high energy, groove intensive eight-man lineup recording music produced, co-written and co-arranged by Shenoy with Matthew Shell, and prominently featuring pianist Lonnie Park and saxophonist Marcus Mitchell. The group members are from all around the world – Matthew Shell from Washington DC, USA, Shenoy from Singapore. Saxophonist Marcus Mitchell from Maryland, USA, pianist, vocalist & mixer Lonnie Park from New York City, keyboard player David Joubert from New Jersey, USA, guitarist Samituru from Finland, bass player Hector Ruano from Venezuela and drummer Glenn Welman from South Africa. The group began workion a funk driven smooth jazz-oriented project dedicated to mankind's fascination with flying. In an interview, Shenoy has stated that idea of this concept album is, in part, a posthumous tribute to Roshni Mohapatra (7 Jan 1980 – 13 December 2018), his ex-wife of 16 years who died in 2018. She had envisioned Shenoy's previous project as a multi-sensory experience of music, art, animation and physical packaging. She had cited David Bowie and Pink Floyd as some of her early influences for art direction of musical projects.

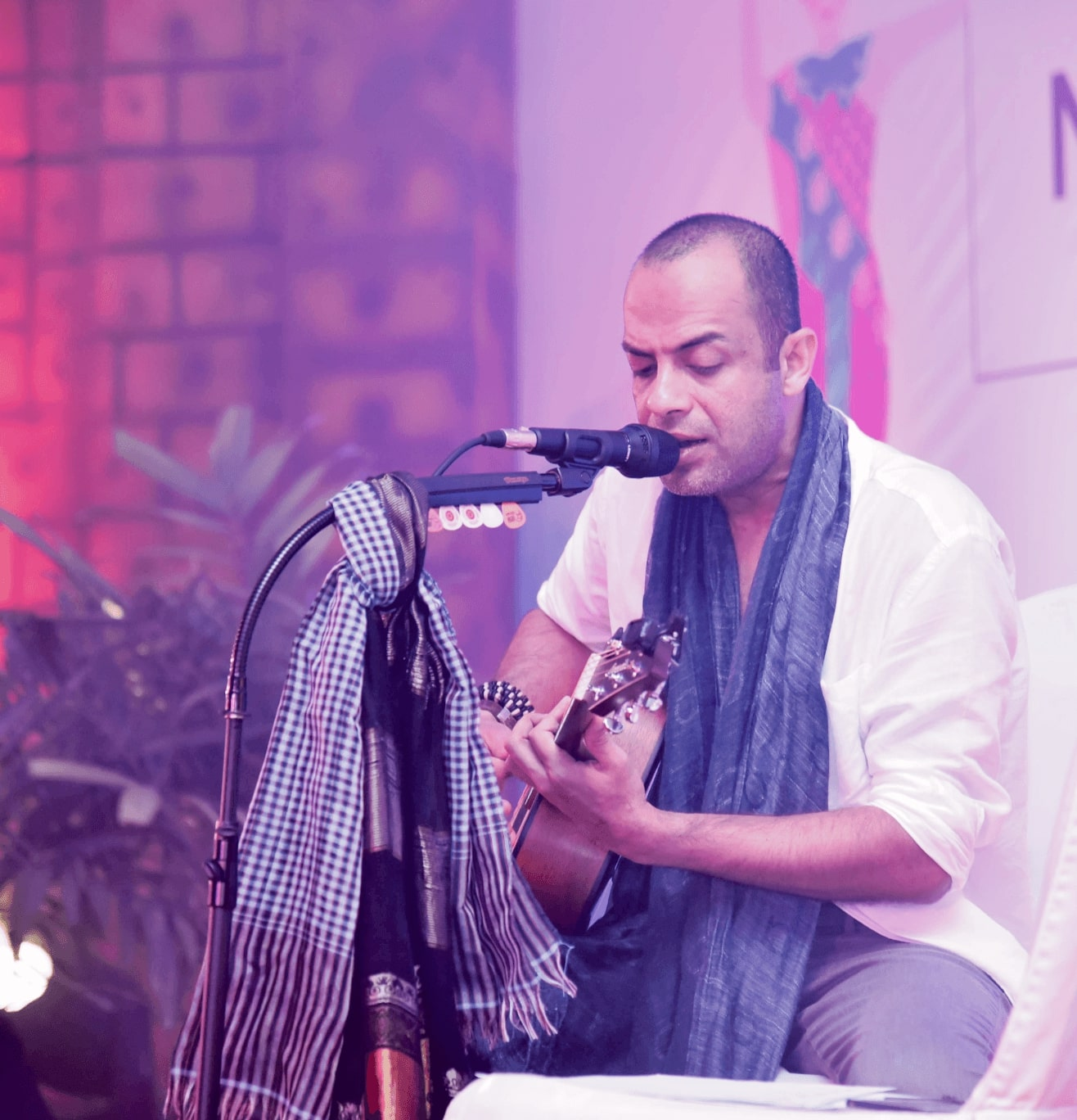
Shenoy performing at Siem Reap, Cambodia in May 2018

The inspiration for the debut single "Pilot" released on 31 July 2019 came from a popular quote by author and speaker Michael Althusser: "The bad news is time flies. The good news is you're the pilot." The second single, "First Flight" released on 30 August 2019 was inspired by the quote from Leonardo da Vinci: "Once you have tasted flight, you will forever walk the earth with your eyes turned skyward, for there you have been, and there you will always long to return." The third single "To Be a Bird" released on 10 October 2019, draws inspiration from the quote by Neil Armstrong: "Gliders, sailplanes, they are wonderful flying machines. It's the closest you can come to being a bird."

The fourth single, the island vibe jazz track titled "Ocean of Air" released on 10 November 2019 was inspired from the quote by L. Welch Pogue – "Unlike the boundaries of the sea by the shorelines, the ocean of air laps at the border of every state, city, town and home throughout the world." The cover art is of the Cliffs of Dover, Shenoy's tribute to Eric Johnson for his song by the same name, that won the Grammy Award for Best Rock Instrumental Performance in 1992, and a big part of Shenoy's musical journey. Like the earlier songs, "Ocean Of Air" is built on a solid foundation of funk. However, this track also picks up the tempo. As a result, the new track finds the band stepping out of the Smooth Jazz arena and a little further into the world of Jazz Fusion. The tune has been compared to a theater play than a music track, with elements of tension, a plot, a rise, and an almost mysterious calming part. The musicians have been referred to as a musical mastermind conglomerate and the tune as the soundtrack of life.

The sixth single, titled "Shadows" released on 1 January 2020 was inspired from the quote by Amelia Earhart – "You haven't seen a tree until you've seen its shadow from the sky." The track adds a classic Soul/ R&B vibe to The Groove Project's guitar and saxophone led, Smooth Jazz groove, reminiscent of George Benson.

"Home in the Sky" is the seventh single in the project released on 20 January 2020. The song was inspired by the Jerry Crawford quote, "To most people, the sky is the limit. To those who love aviation, the sky is home." The new piece leans a little more into the Pop music realm than previous singles. The composition and arrangement follow a funky downbeat groove than takes the band slightly left of center from their previous Smooth Jazz releases. However, the group's signature saxophone and guitar leads ultimately land this track firmly in The Groove Project's Jazzy home. Some of the guitar work has been compared to that of Mike Oldfield

"Leap of Faith" is the eighth single from the project released on 15 February 2020. The song was inspired by the Lauren Oliver quote, "He who leaps for the sky may fall, it's true. But he may also fly." The song has been reviewed as an upbeat and funky number. The first two minutes of the piece follow in the footsteps of the group's previous releases, with Mitchell's saxophone playing sitting front and center. At the halfway point, Park performs a rhythmic and percussive piano solo. The final act features Samituru's Jazz licks.

"Gravity" is the ninth single released by The Groove Project on 29 February 2020, which features Armenian pianist, Vahagn Stepanyan. The music is inspired by a quote by Michael Cunningham –"The secret of flight is this – you have to do it immediately, before your body realizes it is defying the laws." The song has a New Age feel, with the group's signature duo of saxophone and guitar trade bluesy, Smooth Jazz licks. Stephanyan takes center stage for an extended solo at the 4:30 mark.

Looking back at Shenoy's music over the years, music critic Jonathan Widran has noted that Shenoy's discography may sound a bit scattered, but it's reflective of a brilliant, multi-faceted creative mind, pushed relentlessly by a restless spirit. He has stated that (band) name shifts aside, it's some of the most compelling, heartfelt and life affirming music he has heard.

== Accolades ==
His album Rumbadoodle was nominated for the Best Pop Instrumental Album at the 55th Annual Grammy Awards held on 10 February 2013 in Los Angeles. He was nominated along with Larry Carlton, Dave Koz, Gerald Albright and Norman Brown, and the eventual winner Chris Botti. He was the first ever Singapore citizen to be nominated for a Grammy. His follow-up album, A Stagey Bank Affair, was chosen as the Critics's Pick for Best Album of the Year by Jazziz Magazine. He was conferred the Outstanding Computing Alumni Award by the School of Computing at NUS in 2018 and is also a Distinguished Alumni of MIT, Manipal.
