= Tre Nagella =

American music producer

- Genres: R&B; gospel; hip hop; pop; rock; country; jazz
- Occupations: Recording engineer; mixer; record producer
- Years active: 1999–present
- Website: trenagella.com

Tre Nagella is an American audio engineer, mixer, and record producer. He has won four Grammy Awards and worked with artists including Kirk Franklin, Ed Sheeran, Blake Shelton, Lady Gaga, Travis Scott, Brandy, and Monica, among others. He launched the recording studio Luminous Sound Studios in Dallas, Texas in 2019.

== Career ==
Tre Nagella started playing guitar in his teens and was involved with his High School's technical theater department, running the audio for the orchestra, choir, jazz band, musicals, and dance concerts. After graduating from High School, he attended Full Sail Center for the Recording Arts where he won four Directors Awards and was the Valedictorian of his class.

Nagella had a long working relationship with gospel artist Kirk Franklin, winning three Grammy Awards for engineering his albums, Losing My Religion, Hello Fear, and The Fight of My Life. He has also engineered and mixed many of the albums for Franklin's record label including The Walls Group’s Grammy-nominated album, Fast Forward.

He has engineered and mixed albums for artists Ed Sheeran, Travis Scott, Lady Gaga, Blake Shelton, Christina Aguilera, Pimp C, Monica, Alan Parsons, Ledisi, Tamela Mann and others. He co-produced Kitt Wakeley's Symphony of Sinners & Saints album which peaked at #1 on Billboard's Classical Crossover and Classical charts. He has written and produced music used in advertising campaigns for Apple, Samsung, Ford Motor Company and Smirnoff Vodka, among others.

Nagella, along with choral group Verdigris Ensemble and technology company Async Art, created the first programmable music NFT (non-fungible tokens) called Betty's Notebook, a 21-minute programmable piece of music.

Nagella has been a panel and guest speaker at SXSW, The Recording Academy, Full Sail Center for the Recording Arts, The Fine Arts Department at CFBISD (Carrollton-Farmers Branch Independent School District), and the Recording Connection, among others. The Fine Arts Department at CFBISD (Carrollton-Farmers Branch Independent School District) inducted him into the Hall of Fame at the CFBISD Fine Arts State and National Awards Ceremony in 2022.

In 2025, Nagella was announced as one of the remixers for the 2026 FIFA World Cup theme, representing the Dallas area.

== Awards ==
Year	Nominated work	Category		Award	Result
2022	Losing My Religion (Kirk Franklin)	Best Gospel Album	Mixing & Engineering	Grammy Award	Won
2012	Hello Fear (Kirk Franklin)	Best Gospel Album	Mixing & Engineering	Grammy Award	Won
2009	The Fight of My Life (Kirk Franklin)	Best Contemporary R&B Gospel Album	Mixing & Engineering	Grammy Award	Won

== Selected discography ==
Year	Album	Artist	Credit
2021	Symphony of Sinners & Saints	Kitt Wakeley	Co-producer, mixing, engineer
2021	Manifest	Bobby Sessions	Mixing
2019	The Secret	Alan Parsons	Engineer
2019	Antisocial	Ed Sheeran featuring Travis Scott	Vocal engineer
2018	The Hate U Give (film)	Bobby Sessions · Keite Young - Fight the Power	Mixing
2018	Only Human	Calum Scott	Vocal engineer
2018	Midnight in Macedonia	Kitt Wakeley	Vocal engineer
2017	Let Love Rule	Ledisi	Engineer
2017	Greenleaf (TV series) Soundtrack	Various artists	Engineer
2016	Hidden Figures (soundtrack)	Various Artists	Engineer
2015	Reloaded: 20 Number 1 Hits	Blake Shelton	Engineer
2015	Long Live the Pimp	Pimp C	Mixing
2015	Losing My Religion	Kirk Franklin	Mixing, engineer
2015	New Life	Monica	Vocal engineer
2015	7 Summers	Shaun Martin	Engineer
2014	Philthy	Philip Lassiter	Engineer
2014	Here Right Now	Tasha Page-Lockhart	Mixing
2014	Fast Forward	The Walls Group	Mixing
2012	Lotus	Christina Aguilera	Assistant engineer
2012	Joyful Noise Soundtrack	Various artists	Engineer
2012	Best Days	Tamela Mann	Engineer
2011	Hello Fear	Kirk Franklin	Engineer, Guitar, Drum Programming, Digital Editing
2009	Hillbilly Bone	Blake Shelton	Assistant engineer
2009	The Big Picture	Da' T.R.U.T.H.	Engineer
2009	Master Plan	Tamela Mann	Mixing
2008	Crystal Aikin	Crystal Aikin	Engineer
2007	The Fight of My Life	Kirk Franklin	Keyboards
2006	RS2	Rhonda Smith	Vocal Recording
