= Symphony of Sinners & Saints =

Studio album by Kitt Wakeley
- Released: May 21, 2021
- Studio: Abbey Road Studios
- Genre: Rock; EDM; symphonic rock; classical
- Length: 38:02
- Label: Studio Seven Media
- Producer: Kitt Wakeley; Tre Nagella

Kitt Wakeley chronology
Midnight in Macedonia (2018)	Symphony of Sinners & Saints (2021)

Singles from Symphony of Sinners & Saints
- 1. "Conflicted" Released: February 26, 2021; 2. "Sinners & Saints" Released: April 16, 2021; 3. "Forgive Me" Released: May 14, 2021

Symphony of Sinners & Saints is a concept studio album by American orchestral composer, songwriter, pianist/keyboardist, and music producer Kitt Wakeley. The album peaked at #1 on Billboard's Classical Crossover and Classical charts, and at #18 on Hot Hard Rock Songs. It was recorded at Abbey Road Studios in London, UK and released on May 21, 2021, by the Studio Seven Media record label. The album was recorded with an orchestra, several choirs, and a rock band, with elements of rock, EDM, Classical, and symphonic rock. Feature guest appearances include Joe Satriani, Andy Timmons, the Royal Philharmonic Orchestra, the London Voices, and the Dallas Gospel of Light Choir.

The album was supported by three singles, "Conflicted", "Sinners & Saints", and "Forgive Me", which all reached No. 1 on Billboard's Hard Rock Digital Sales chart. It won Album of the Year at the Josie Music Awards, and "You Gave Me Wings" won Best Instrumental Song at the 2021 Hollywood Music in Media Awards. Wakeley charted in the top 10 of 2021's Year-End Classical Crossover Albums Artists.

== Background ==
=== History ===
Symphony of Sinners & Saints was conceived when the COVID-19 pandemic resulted in the cancellation of Wakeley's live shows for 2020. Having an abundance of time away from touring led to the album's creation, production, and guest list. In an interview with American Songwriter magazine, Wakeley said, "There’s a really dark, sinister underlying bed, but then there’s this euphoric stuff over it. That's the concept of the album."

The album was initially recorded at Abbey Road Studios in London, UK, then co-produced, engineered, and mixed by Tre Nagella at Luminous Sound Studios in Dallas, Texas. Due to the pandemic, Wakeley recorded remotely from Oklahoma City, Oklahoma, tapping into the musicians in London in real time to work on each song.

The album was supported by three singles, "Conflicted", "Sinners & Saints", and "Forgive Me", which all peaked at No. 1 on the Billboard Hard Rock Digital Sales chart. Wakeley charted in the top ten of 2021's Year-End Classical Crossover Albums Artists. Symphony of Sinners & Saints won Album of the Year at the Josie Music Awards, and "You Gave Me Wings" won Best Instrumental Song at the 2021 Hollywood Music in Media Awards.

To promote the release of the album, Wakeley performed at venues including Carnegie Hall, and the Civic Center Music Hall in Oklahoma City.

=== Joe Satriani collaboration ===
Joe Satriani played lead guitar on the tracks "Conflicted" and "Forgive Me". When asked about working with Satriani, Wakeley replied, "I emailed very well known artists of Joe's caliber on their respective instruments. Joe being so gracious opened up a whole lot more doors of other artists who wanted to play on my project."

== Critical reception ==
The album received favorable reviews from music critics upon its release:

"The larger-than-life track showcases rock-driven guitar shredding alongside precise and sprawling orchestration, making for a uniquely powerful hybrid of chamber music, heavy metal and rock, and film score." - Glide Magazine

"The album is great on first listen, but repeated plays reveal more and more layers and the listener will find him/herself drawn further in and finding new things to hear with each listen. A stunning piece of creative artistry!" - Andy Hawes, Metal Planet Music

== Charts ==
Chart (2021)	Peak position
US Classical Crossover (Billboard)	1
US Classical (Billboard)	1
US Hard Rock Albums (Billboard)	12

Singles

Year	Title	Chart	Peak position
Year	Title	Chart	Billboard US
2021	"Conflicted" (featuring Joe Satriani)	Hard Rock Digital Sales	1
2021	"Forgive Me" (featuring Joe Satriani)	Hard Rock Digital Sales	1
2021	"Sinners and Saints"	Hard Rock Digital Sales	1

== Track listing ==
Saints & Sinners track listing
No.	Title	Writer(s)	Producer(s)	Length
1.	"Wicked Ways" (featuring Andy Timmons)	Kitt Wakeley	Kitt Wakeley; Tre Nagella	3:23
2.	"Sinners & Saints"	Kitt Wakeley	Kitt Wakeley; Tre Nagella	3:53
3.	"Forgive Me" (featuring Joe Satriani)	Kitt Wakeley	Kitt Wakeley; Tre Nagella	3:47
4.	"Hello Again"	Kitt Wakeley	Kitt Wakeley; Tre Nagella	5:02
5.	"Conflicted" (featuring Joe Satriani)	Kitt Wakeley	Kitt Wakeley; Tre Nagella	2:54
6.	"No Apologies"	Kitt Wakeley	Kitt Wakeley; Tre Nagella	4:01
7.	"Requiem of the Fallen"	Kitt Wakeley	Kitt Wakeley; Tre Nagella	3:26
8.	"End of My Journey"	Kitt Wakeley	Kitt Wakeley; Tre Nagella	4:02
9.	"You Gave Me Wings"	Kitt Wakeley	Kitt Wakeley; Tre Nagella	3:38
10.	"Echoes of Amadeus"	Kitt Wakeley	Kitt Wakeley; Tre Nagella	3:55
Total length:				38:02

== Personnel ==
=== Musicians ===
- Piano and synthesizer - Kitt Wakeley
- Guitar - Andy Timmons (track 1)
- Guitar - Paige Harwell (track 2)
- Guitar - Joe Satriani (tracks 3, 5)
- Guitar - João Miguel (track 6, 10)
- Guitar - Daniel Uribe (tracks 4, 7, 8)
- Guitar - Felipe Sanches (track 7)
- Bass - Ryan Miller (tracks 1–10)
- Drums - Brent Berry (tracks 1–10)
- Orchestra - Royal Philharmonic Orchestra (tracks 1–10)
- Orchestration - Kitt Wakeley (tracks 1–10)
- Conductor - Cliff Masterson (1–10)
- Choir - London Voices (tracks 1–10)

=== Technical ===
- Producers - Kitt Wakeley and Tre Nagella
- Recording engineer - Lewis Jones
- Mixing engineer - Tre Nagella
- Mastering engineer - Kevin Lively
- Recording studio - Abbey Road Studios, London, UK
- Mixing studio - Luminous Studios - Dallas, Texas
- Mastering studio - Lively Mastering - Oklahoma City, Oklahoma

=== Additional personnel ===
- Graphic artist - Kitt Wakeley
- Photography - Teresa Jolie
