= Starr Parodi =

American composer

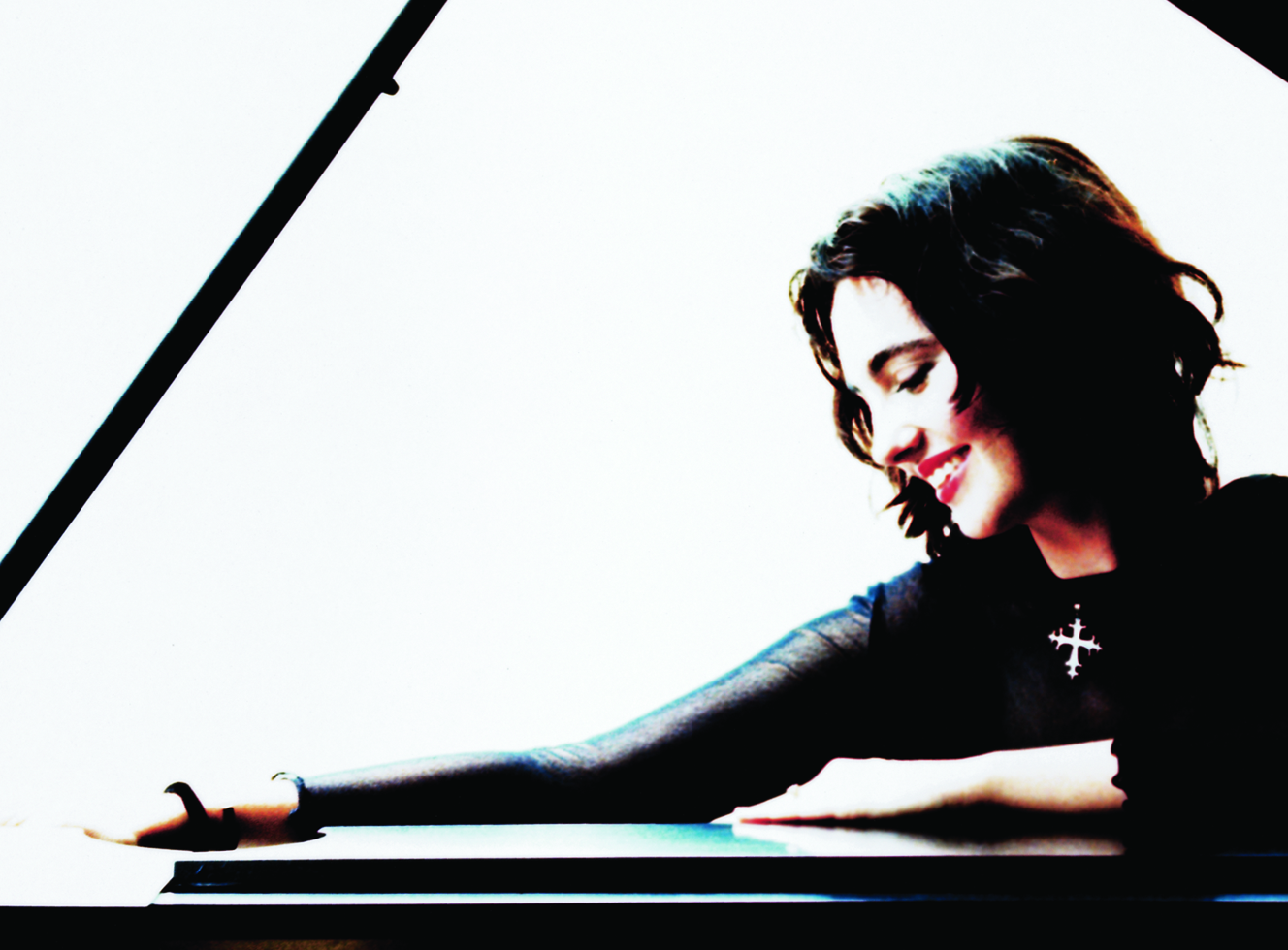
- Parodi with her 1928 Steinway B which was destroyed in the 2025 Los Angeles widfire

Background information
- Origin: Los Angeles, California, U.S.
- Genres: Neoclassical; pop; jazz; experimental; soul
- Occupations: Composer; musician; conductor; record producer
- Instruments: Piano; synthesizer
- Years active: 1988–present
- Label: Sonic Doppler
- Website: starrparodi.com

Starr Parodi is an American pianist, film composer, music producer, arranger, music director, and former president of The Alliance for Women Film Composers. In 2023, Parodi won the Grammy Award for Best Classical Compendium Album as both a producer and featured artist on An Adoption Story (Kitt Wakeley). Parodi was also a featured artist and composer on 2022 Grammy-winning album (Best Classical Compendium), Women Warriors: The Voices Of Change (Amy Andersson). Parodi won the 2021 Hollywood Music In Media Award for Best Contemporary Classical Composition for her piece Joy Of The Waters (with Amy Andersson/Women Warriors: The Voices Of Change). Parodi has won multiple BMI most performed music awards, Key Art and Telly Awards. In May 2017, Parodi's album "The Heart Of Frida", a collection of solo piano works inspired by the late artist Frida Kahlo, was awarded Zone Music Report's "Piano Album Of The Year - Solo" by International Radio Broadcasters and "Solo Piano Album Of The Year - Improvised" by SoloPiano.com. Parodi's solo piano recording "Common Places" was awarded Solo Piano Recording of the Year by solopianoradio.com in 2007 and in 2005 she received an RIAA Gold Record for her recording and updated arrangement of the "James Bond Theme".

== Composer, producer, arranger and conductor ==
Parodi, along with her husband/partner Jeff Eden Fair, has composed/produced both themes and underscore for a wide variety of films, film trailers, and television shows. These projects includes The Storied Life of A. J. Fikry, The Starter Wife - NBC Universal, The Division - Lifetime, G.I. Joe: Renegades - Hasbro, Transformers: Rescue Bots - Hasbro, Bert Stern: Original Madman - Motor Films, The Arsenio Hall Show - Paramount, The Eighteenth Angel - Rysher Films, High Roller: The Stu Ungar Story - New Line Cinema, Maggie - Paramount. Film trailers include Harry Potter and the Deathly Hallows – Part 1 - Warner Bros., The Last Samurai - Warner Bros., War of the Worlds - Paramount, GoldenEye - United Artists, Die Another Day - United Artists, Mission: Impossible 2 - Paramount and many others.

Parodi co-produced with Terry Sanders, Mary Ann Cummins, Jeff Eden Fair, and Isolde Fair's "To All The Little Girls" music video. She also conducted a live performance of "To All The Little Girls" at Lincoln Center for the 2017 New York Times/Tina Brown - Women In The World Summit, performed by Isolde Fair with an orchestra of young women from the Mannes School and the Renaissance Youth Center Choir.

In 2009 Parodi became the first woman composer to have her orchestral work represented nightly at the Pageant of the Masters in Laguna Beach, California. Parodi is currently a featured composer at The Pageant of the Masters.

Parodi also composed the musical theme for the 1990s-era United Artists production logo.

Parodi was selected to study with Jerry Goldsmith in his first BMI-conducting master class. Parodi has since conducted ensembles from 5 to 95 pieces in live orchestral, live television, and studio recording environments.

Parodi is an official Steinway Piano recording and performing artist. She also uses and endorses Korg synthesizers and Steinberg's recording software.

== Performing musician ==
In Los Angeles, Parodi found herself playing piano and keyboards in various rock, jazz, gospel, and soul bands, teaming up with members of Earth, Wind & Fire, The Temptations, Maze and Parliament-Funkadelic.

Comedian Arsenio Hall invited Parodi to play keyboards on his late-night show, The Arsenio Hall Show, in the show's house band The Posse. During Andrew Dice Clay's July 1990 appearance on the show, Parodi refused to perform in the band, citing Clay's vulgar and misogynistic stand-up act. She refused to leave her dressing room during the taping, stating "as a matter of fact, his material offends me."

Parodi was a featured artist along with Bruce Hornsby, George Duke, and Joe Zawinul at Keyboard magazine's 20th-anniversary concert (celebrating 20 of the world's top contemporary keyboardists).

Parodi has performed as a keyboardist alongside such artists as Mariah Carey, Whitney Houston, Stevie Wonder, Carole King, Carlos Santana, Seal, B.B. King, Ray Charles, Madonna, Celine Dion, Al Green, and many others.

== Partial discography ==
- Kitt Wakeley: An Adoption Story - 2023 Grammy® Winner - Best Classical Compendium Album
- Matt B: Alkebulan - 2023 HMMA Winner
- Women Warriors: The Voices of Change - 2022 Grammy® Winner - Best Classical Compendium Album
- The Storied Life of A.J. Fikry - Original Soundtrack
- Carole King: A Holiday Carole - Deluxe Edition - 2013
- Carole King: A Holiday Carole - 2011
  - piano on "Lo, How a Rose E'er Blooming"
- Bert Stern: The Original Mad Man - 2013 (score only album)
- Callaghan: Callaghan - 2018
- Callaghan: Skin on Skin - 2018
- Callaghan: The Other Side - 2017
- Bert Stern: The Original Mad Man - 2013 (soundtrack/score album)
- The Other Side of OK - 2020 (single)
- I Sama Bili - 2020 (single)
- When Doves Cry - 2019 (single) with Louis Price
- Lucciola - 2020 (single)
- Bay of Silence - 2021 (single)

The Heart of Frida - 2016

1. "The Heart of Frida"
2. "When Doves Cry"
3. "The Elephant and the Dove"
4. "Rancho Hamilton"
5. "Hardly Touching"
6. "Overture of Color"
7. "Nights in White Satin"
8. "Don't Be Discouraged"
9. "Sun & Life"
10. "The Lightness of Frida"
11. "Hope"

Common Places: Piano Improvisations - 2006 (SoloPianoRadio.com CD Of The Year 2007)

1. "Common Places"
2. "For What It's Worth"
3. "Albinoni's Adagio"
4. "Kenya"
5. "We Are Here"
6. "Follow Me"
7. "James Bond Theme"
8. "Forgiveness"
9. "Let It Be"
10. "Covenant"

The Best of Bond... James Bond - 2002 (RIAA Gold Record)

1. "James Bond Theme"

Change - 1991

1. "Change" - 4:33
2. "Something of Value" - 5:15
3. "Kenya" - 5:20
4. "Superstition" - 5:37
5. "Serengeti Trail" - 6:27
6. "The Honor System" - 4:41
7. "Forever" - 3:27
8. "Joyful" - 6:09
9. "Covenant" - 6:31
10. "Change" (Reprise) - 1:16

== Personal ==
Parodi is married to Jeff Eden Fair and together they have a daughter, Isolde Maria Parodi Fair. Parodi is the daughter of geothermal energy pioneer Roy Parodi and his wife Marcella Starr Parodi.
