= Lonnie Park =

American record producer and musician

- Occupations: Record producer, songwriter, musician
- Style: Jazz • New-age • children's • world • gospel • country • folk • progressive metal
- Website: lonniepark.com

Lonnie Park is an American record producer, composer and musician based in Freeville, New York. His work has earned three Grammy Awards and four Grammy Nominations, Global Peace Song Award, Global Music Award, multiple SAMMY Awards, and the United Nations Action Award.

== Early and personal life ==
Lonnie Park was born on August 27, 1968, in Ithaca, New York and raised in a devout Christian Church and school of the Village of Freeville. He attended Brooktondale Baptist School from kindergarten to his senior year of high school. In his senior year he attended Dryden High School and graduated in 1986. Park attended college at Tompkins Cortland Community College as a communications major from 1986 to 1987 and dropped out to pursue his career in music. Park later returned to Tompkins Cortland to complete his associate degree. Following his graduation, Park taught recording Engineering as an adjunct professor. Lonnie has two sons; Nick Park born in 1988 and Dorian Park born in 1990. Lonnie is currently married to Jody Park.

== Music career ==
Lonnie Park is a renowned vocalist, instrumentalist, songwriter, engineer, and producer. Park works across all music genres including progressive and symphonic metal, country, hip-hop, world, folk, instrumental pop, and gospel. In addition to being front man for the band Ten Man Push, 'The Official Band of American Motocross', Lonnie collaborates regularly with Grammy Winning artists and activists such as Arun Shenoy, Baaba Maal, Ricky Kej, Wouter Kellerman. Other collaborators include members of Peter Paul and Mary, Trans-Siberian Orchestra, Badlands/Artension/Royal Hunt, Black Sabbath/Whitesnake, Yes, and Halford. Throughout his career Park has also worked with artists like Merle Haggard, Marla Maples, Sandi Patty, and Nashville songwriter Steven Allen Davis. Lonnie Park continues to play live and tour worldwide as an artist, front man, and instrumentalist. Park was recently nominated for the 2020 Independent Music Producer of the Year award. In addition, his collaboration work "My Earth Songs" with Ricky Kej was a 2021 SAMMY nominee. Park was also a 2021 International Songwriting Contest finalist.

== Business career ==
In 1992, Lonnie and business partner Steve Barnes opened "The Ultimate Music Center" in Cortland NY. This business was a large retail music store, professional recording studio, and pro-audio business. During his time as a business owner of "The Ultimate Music Center", Lonnie composed a book titled "Church Sound Systems" which was published by Hal Leonard Publishing. "The Ultimate Music Center" closed after Barnes' passing in 2010. Lonnie then established the company "Ultimate Sound LLC" in Ithaca NY, which continues to design and install industrial sound systems. In 2016 Park established the music production based "Barncastle Studio". Lonnie's current focus is on his production studio and his music career.

== Philanthropy ==
The United Nations nominated Lonnie's work with Ricky Kej and UNICEF for its SDG Action Award in 2019. This nomination was for the educational music initiative they started called "My Earth Songs". "My Earth Songs" was adopted into the education curriculum for over 5 million kids annually in developing nations. The music is in association with the United Nations Sustainable Development Goals program on subjects like race, equality, sustainability, climate and environment. Lonnie is known as a conservationist and activist regarding NPO's such as the Red Cross and American Heart Association. He performs at events and festivals at the international United Nations and WHO headquarters. He has co-created anthems for UNICEF, UNESCO, the UN, and the WHO. Lonnie has also produced music for causes such as Autism Works, Autism Movement, and Puzzle Solvers.

== Discography ==
Blind Phoenix "Truth Or Dare" 2021 – Mix engineer, keyboardist, vocalist

Lonnie Park and Coconut Creek "Wonder Why" 2021 – Producer, vocalist <https://www.coconutcreektheband.com/>

Lonnie Park, Ricky Kej and Konshens The MC "In Your Eyes" 2021 – Artist

Lonnie Park and the Earth Band "My Earth Songs" 2020 – Composer, producer, instrumentalist, vocalist <https://www.myearthsongs.com/>

Shine Your Light Virtual Live Concert 2020 – Artist

Ila Paliwal "Earth Symphony" 2020 – Vocals, multi-instrumentalist

Lonnie Park and Wouter Kellerman "Fragile (Sting)" 2020 – Instrumentalist, vocalist

Lonnie Park, Ricky Kej, Baaba Maal, Ip Singh "Born From The Land" 2019 – Composer, Instrumentalist, vocalist

United Nations General Assembly Week with Ricky Kej 2019 – Artist, speaker

Lonnie Park and The Groove Project "Pilot" 2019 – Instrumentalist, vocalist <https://thegrooveproject.band>

Let Us Live Live Concert on Climate Change 2019 – Artist

The Rods "Brotherhood of Metal" 2019 – Keyboardist engineer

Lonnie Park and Steve Corey "Link of Chain" 2019 – Instrumentalist, vocalist

WHO Conference on Air Pollution and Health "BreatheLife" with Ricky Kej 2018 – Vocalist, composer

Lonnie Park and Peter, Paul, and Mary "Where Are My Rainbows" 2018 – Co-writer, producer instrumentalist, vocalist

Roundglass Music Awards with Ricky Kej, Nathan Horton, Patti Austin, etc. 2018 – Artist

Lonnie Park "Better Than You Found It" 2017 – Composer, producer, vocalist, instrumentalist

Roundglass Samsara Festival 2017 – Artist

Ricky Kej "Shanti Samsara" 2016 – Producer, composer, vocalist, instrumentalist <http://www.allmusic.com/album/shanti-samsara-mw0002981560>

Action Moves People United with Dan Aykroyd, Julian Lennon, etc. (Billboard #8, 2016)- Producer, composer, vocalist, instrumentalist <http://www.actionmovespeopleunited.org>

Lonnie Park "Almost Showtime" 2015 – Artist

Lonnie Park with Bernie Taupin and Mark Paladino – "This American Trail" 2015- Artist, co-writer

Temple Grandin & Friends: Autism Works Now with Temple Grandin, Michael Tolleson, Susan Osborne, etc. 2015 – Composer, vocalist, instrumentalist

Sridhar & Arun Shenoy – "Make Up Your Mind feat. Lonnie Park" 2015 <https://narked.com/artists/sridharandarunshenoy/>

Arun Shenoy "Rumbadoodle" 2013 Grammy Best Pop Instrumental Album Nominee – Piano, composer <https://narked.com/artists/sridharandarunshenoy/>

Wrathchild America "3D", Atlantic Records- Keyboards

John West "Mind Journey", Shrapnel Records- Songwriter

John West "Permanent Mark", Shrapnel Records- Songwriting, Keyboards, Backing Vocals

John West "Earth Maker", Frontiers Records & Yamaha Records- Songwriter, co-Producer, Mix & Mastering Engineer, Backing Vocals, Keyboards

John West "Long Time No sing" Frontiers Records – Songwriter, co-Producer, Mix & Mastering Engineer, Backing Vocals, Keyboards, Guitars, Bass

Artension "Machine", Shrapnel Records- Backing Vocals and Vocal Arrangements, Engineering

Artension "Sacred Pathways", Frontiers Records – Co-Production, Backing Vocals and Vocal Arrangements, Tracking, Mixing, and Mastering Engineering

Artension "Future World"- Backing Vocals and Vocal Arrangements, Engineering

Artension "New Discovery"- Backing Vocals and Vocal Arrangements, Engineering

Feinstein "Third Wish", SPV Records – Vocal Production and Engineering

Feinstein "One Night in the Jungle", Hollywood Island Music- Keyboards, Engineering, co-Production

Cozy Powell "Especially For You", Polydor Records -Songwriting, Keyboards, Backing Vocals

Slave to the Power "The Iron Maiden Tribute" Revolver USA/Meteor City -Recording Engineering and Mixing, All Backing Vocals for "Run to the Hills"

James Murphy "Feeding The Machine", Shrapnel Records -Backing Vocals & Engineering on "The Visitors"

Royal Hunt "Eye Witness"- Recording Engineer/Bonus Track

Chris Caffery "House of Insanity", 2008 Label TBA – Recording engineering, Backing Vocal Arrangement and Backing Vocals, Keyboards

Ten Man Push "Self Titled Debut", Nozenglazzes Records- Lead Vocals, Guitars, Bass, Keyboards, Songwriting, Production, Recording, Mixing, and Mastering Engineer, Backing Vocals

Ten Man Push "Playing in the Dirt", Nozenglazzes Records ( Same credits as debut)

Steve Corey " Your Stinking Love" Full production including most instrumentation as well as mix and master.

Notable Appearances on Independent Releases: Randy McStine "Second Shot" Randy McStine "Shredding Skin" Colleen Kattau "Inhabited Woman" Colleen Kattau "About Time" Tink Bennett & Tailor Made "We're Here Tink Bennett & Tailor Made "It Never Ends" Andrew James "Wildly Alive With Music" Greg Soshinky "Waves Of Time" Travis Rocco "Gone" Many Moons "Many Moons" Destiny "Side By Side" Our Planet Band

Film/TV Works:The American Way TV (Theme and score), Up And Out with Connie Pfeif (Theme), The Sweet Life with Chris Xaver National Cooking show (Theme, score, and post audio)"Waiting On Alphie" White Lightning Productions / Diesel Movie Werks (Soundtrack, Sound Mixer) "Dream House" Chinimble Lore/ Kevin Hicks (Soundtrack, Sound Mixer) Nitro Circus "Thrillbillys" Travis Pastrana (Soundtrack) Versus Network "Racer TV" (Theme Song, 2010–present) "Cayuga Lake Wine Country" Elk Productions (Host and Narrator) "High School Challenge" TC3 Television Production (Theme Song)

Technology Products: "Gorgeous Piano I, Lonnie Park Signature Series" Loop Library, Hark Productions "Gorgeous Piano II, Lonnie Park Signature Series" Loop Library, Hark Productions "Trak Paks" VASST/Hark "Rap Beats" Hark "Studio Tools" Loop Library, Hark Productions

Live Audio: Ricky Kej and United Nations NYC FOH Mix Little Feat Hillary Clinton Dalai Lama (1990) Twila Paris Phil Keaggy Chuck Gerrard Dennis Agajanian YWAM USA Tour

Commercial/Industrial Audio Contributions: Clients Toyota, GE, PepsiCo, Corporate Video Works, Tompkins Library DVD, First National Bank of Dryden, Bruce's Soft Touch, ES&L Bank, Tompkins Cortland Community College

Written Works: "Church Sound Systems" by Lonnie Park, Hal Leonard Publishing – See more at: http://lonniepark.com
