= Rumbadoodle =

Studio album by Arun Shenoy
- Released: August 30, 2012
- Genre: Pop
- Length: 42:52

Rumbadoodle is the debut studio album from Arun Shenoy. It was recorded across the world over the period of two years and was released on August 30, 2012. The album was nominated for a Grammy Award in the Best Instrumental Pop album category in February 2013.

The album consists of 11 songs, which are individually named by a wide range of styles that are integrated into every song. Shenoy contributes all the proceeds from the album to an education fund for underprivileged people in India.

== Composition ==
The album has a flamenco feel with fusion influences drawn from contemporary pop, rock and jazz. While he himself claims to have more of a rock and roll background, he was fascinated by Flamenco from a young age, which drove him to try something unfamiliar. Shenoy has cited Yanni as a major inspiration for the album.

== Track listing ==
No.	Title	Writer(s)	Length
1.	"Rumbadoodle"	Arun Shenoy, Ian Cameron, Glenn Sharp, Jonathan Wesley	3:51
2.	"My Ballad Days"	Arun Shenoy, Ramil Duke Purisima, Glenn Sharp	4:02
3.	"Prance"	Arun Shenoy, Ramil Duke Purisima	3:58
4.	"Rock and Rigmarole"	Arun Shenoy, Owen Gurry, Glenn Sharp, Jonathan Wesley	4:46
5.	"The Violin Song"	Arun Shenoy, Ian Cameron	3:29
6.	"Fireflies"	Arun Shenoy, Ramil Duke Purisima, Glenn Sharp, Jonathan Wesley	4:28
7.	"Blue Sky Happiness Pt. I"	Arun Shenoy, Owen Gurry, Glenn Sharp	3:56
8.	"Blue Sky Happiness Pt. II"	Arun Shenoy, Lonnie Park	5:10
9.	"Sleepy Town"	Arun Shenoy	2:47
10.	"Wanderlust In Keys"	Arun Shenoy, Glenn Sharp, Edward Roth	3:49
11.	"Rhythm of the Sun"	Arun Shenoy, Ramil Duke Purisima, Lonnie Park	2:36

== Production and personnel ==
The Art Directors of the album included Roshni Mohapatra, who is also Shenoy’s wife.

- Arun Shenoy - Album Artist, Arranger, Art Direction, Composer, Engineer, Liner Notes, Producer
- Ian Cameron - Composer, Violin
- Robert Capria - Art Direction, Artwork
- Jerry Chua - Drums, Mixing, Mastering
- Owen Gurry - Composer, Guitar (Electric), String Arrangements
- Shamoon Khatri - Keyboards
- Roshni Mohpatra - Art Direction, Artwork, Liner Notes, Photography
- Lonnie Park - Composer, Keyboards, Piano
- Ramil Duke Purisima - Arranger, Bass, Composer, Engineer, Percussion
- Edward Roth - Composer, Organ, Piano
- Glenn Sharp – Composer, Guitar (Flamenco)
- Jonathan Wesley – Composer, Keyboards, Piano Arrangement, String Arrangements

== Charts ==
Chart (2013)	Peak position
ZMR Charts	4

== See also ==
- Arun Shenoy
