= Tom Busby (musician) =

Australian blues and roots musician (born 1980 or 1981)

- Born: Thomas Busby; 1980 or 1981 (age 45–46)
- Origin: Rockhampton, Queensland
- Occupations: Singer; songwriter; guitarist; musician
- Years active: 2007–present
- Website: tombusby.com.au

Thomas "Tom" Busby (born 1980 or 1981) is an Australian singer, songwriter, guitarist, and musician, best known as one half of blues and roots duo Busby Marou, who formed in Queensland in 2007.

On 20 February 2026, Busby released his debut solo studio album, Rockhampton Hangover, which peaked at number 3 on the ARIA Albums Chart.

== Career ==
=== 2007–present: Busby Marou ===
Busby and Jeremy Marou formed the blues and roots duo Busby Marou in 2007. Together, they have released five studio albums—Busby Marou (2010), Farewell Fitzroy (2013), Postcards from the Shell House (2017), The Great Divide (2019), and Blood Red (2023).

=== 2026: Rockhampton Hangover ===
Busby released his debut solo studio album, Rockhampton Hangover on 20 February 2026. Rockhampton Hangover debuted and peaked at number 3 on ARIA Albums Chart.

== Personal life ==
Busby is married to his wife, Huma. The pair listed their waterfront property in Currumbin Waters, Queensland for sale shortly before his 2025 the Lottery Tour. Busby is a fan of the Australian Football League team the Gold Coast Suns.

== Discography ==
=== Studio albums ===
List of studio albums, with release date, label, release formats, and selected chart positions shown
Title	Details	Peak chart positions
Title	Details	AUS
Rockhampton Hangover	Released: 20 February 2026; Label: Tom Busby (GYR0254543); Formats: CD, LP, digital download, streaming	3

== Awards and nominations ==
=== APRA Awards ===
Year	Nominee / work	Award	Result	Ref.
2012	"Biding My Time": (Thomas Busby; Jeremy Marou)	Blues & Roots Work of the Year	Won	
2014	"Get You out of Here": (Busby; Marou)	Blues & Roots Work of the Year	Nominated	
2014	"Luck": (Busby; Don Walker)	Blues & Roots Work of the Year	Nominated	
2018	"Best Part of Me": (Busby; Marou; Jon Hume)	Blues & Roots Work of the Year	Won	
2018	"Getaway Car": (Busby; Marou; David Ryan Harris)	Blues & Roots Work of the Year	Nominated	
2020	"Sound of Summer": (Busby; Marou; Phil Barton; Lindsay Rimes)	Most Performed Blues & Roots Work of the Year	Nominated	
2021	"Over Drinking Over You": (Busby; Marou; Lindsay Jackson; Hume; Kayla Rae Haywood)	Most Performed Blues & Roots Work	Won	

=== The Triffid - Queensland Album of the Year ===
The Triffid - Queensland Album of the Year is an annual award that is presented to a Queensland band or musical act for the best album of the year. The winner is selected from six nominees and they the spine of their album art painted on the 'Triffid Wall'.

Year	Nominee / work	Award	Result
2026	Rockhampton Hangover	Qld Album of the Year	Won
