= APRA Music Awards of 2012 =

Annual Australian music awards

- Date: 28 May 2012
- Location: Sydney Convention and Exhibition Centre
- Hosted by: Missy Higgins, Jonathan Biggins
- Website: apra-amcos.com.au/2012APRAMusicAwards/index.html

The Australasian Performing Right Association Awards of 2012 (generally known as APRA Awards) are a series of related awards which include the APRA Music Awards, Art Music Awards, and Screen Music Awards. The APRA Music Awards of 2012 was the 30th annual ceremony by the Australasian Performing Right Association (APRA) and the Australasian Mechanical Copyright Owners Society (AMCOS) to award outstanding achievements in contemporary songwriting, composing and publishing. The ceremony was held on 28 May 2012 at the Sydney Convention and Exhibition Centre. The Art Music Awards were introduced in 2011 to replace the Classical Music Awards (last held in 2009) and were distributed on 3 April at the Sydney Opera House. They are sponsored by APRA and the Australian Music Centre (AMC) to "recognise achievement in the composition, performance, education and presentation of Australian music". The Screen Music Awards were issued on 19 November by APRA and Australian Guild of Screen Composers (AGSC), which "acknowledges excellence and innovation in the genre of screen composition".

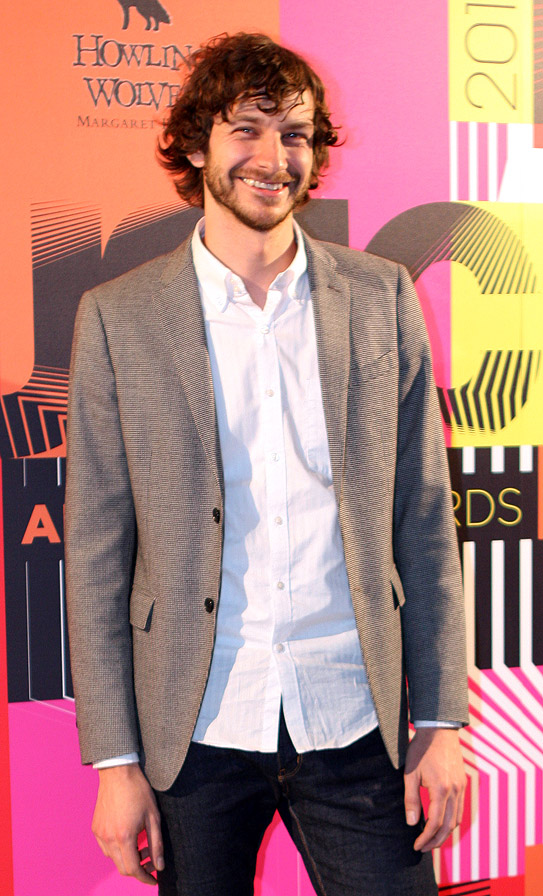
At the 2012 ceremony, Gotye (aka Wally de Backer) won three APRA Music Awards: Songwriter of the Year, Song of the Year and Most Played Australian Work.

On 2 May nominations for the APRA Music Awards were announced on multiple news sources, with Lanie Lane being the most nominated artist. Hosts for the 2012 APRA Music Awards were Missy Higgins and Jonathan Biggins. A total of 12 awards were presented. Sydney-based talent agent, Mary Lopez, was honoured with the Ted Albert Award for Outstanding Services to Australian Music. Gotye (aka Wally de Backer) received the most awards, winning Songwriter of the Year, Song of the Year and Most Played Australian Work. The APRA Music Awards ceremony is due to be broadcast on the MAX network on 12 June 2012.

== Presenters ==
At the APRA Music Awards, aside from the hosts, Missy Higgins and Jonathan Biggins, the presenters were Yusuf Islam, Felicity Urquhart, Philip Mortlock and New South Wales Premier, Barry O'Farrell.

== Performances ==
The APRA Music Awards ceremony showcased performances by:

- Tina Arena featuring Tex Perkins – "Somebody That I Used to Know"
- Kate Miller-Heidke – "You Should Consider Having Sex With a Bearded Man"
- Bob Evans – "I Started a Joke"
- Kram – "Oh Well, That's What You Get For Falling in Love With a Cowboy"
- Russell Morris and PVT – "The Real Thing"
- Sophia Brous – "Cameo Lover"
- Bertie Blackman – "Brother"

== APRA Music Awards ==
=== Blues & Roots Work of the Year ===
Title and/or artist	Writer(s)	Publisher(s)	Result
"Biding My Time" – Busby Marou	Thomas Busby, Jeremy Marou	Sony, ATV Music Publishing Australia Pty Ltd	Won
"Compass" – Saltwater Band	Charlie Yunupingu, David Yunupingu	Sony, ATV Music Publishing Australia Pty Ltd obo SFM Publishing	Nominated
"Falling" – The Waifs	Josh Cunningham, Donna Simpson, Vikki Thorn	Native Tongue Music Publishing Pty Ltd	Nominated
"(Oh Well) That's What You Get (Falling in Love with a Cowboy)" – Lanie Lane	Lanie Lane	Ivy League Music administered by Mushroom Music Pty Ltd	Nominated
"What Do I Do" – Lanie Lane	Lanie Lane	Ivy League Music administered by Mushroom Music Pty Ltd	Nominated

=== Breakthrough Songwriter of the Year ===
Title and/or artist	Writer(s)	Publisher(s)	Result
"Sing It (The Life of Riley)" – Drapht	Daniel Rankine, Paul Ridge (aka Drapht)	Sony, ATV Music Publishing Australia Pty Ltd obo Blue Max Music Publishing, Kobalt Music Publishing Australia Pty Ltd	Nominated
Boy & Bear	Killian Gavin, Jonathon Hart, Timothy Hart, David Hosking, Jacob Tarasenko	Mushroom Music	Won
Kimbra	Kimbra (aka Kimbra Johnson)	Warner/Chappell Music Australia Pty Ltd obo WB Music Corp	Nominated
Lanie Lane	Lanie Lane	Ivy League Music administered by Mushroom Music Pty Ltd	Nominated
Matt Corby	Matt Corby	Mushroom Music Pty Ltd obo Rocky Lane Music LLP	Nominated

=== Country Work of the Year ===
Title and/or artist	Writer(s)	Publisher(s)	Result
"Bad Machines" – Shane Nicholson	Shane Nicholson	Mushroom Music Pty Ltd	Nominated
"Beautiful Mess" – Kasey Chambers	Kasey Chambers	Mushroom Music Pty Ltd	Nominated
"Famous Last Words" – Shane Nicholson	Shane Nicholson	Mushroom Music Pty Ltd	Won
"Meant to Be" – O'Shea	Kim Carnes, Mark O'Shea, Jay Smith	Warner, Chappell Music Australia Pty Ltd, J Albert and Son Pty Ltd	Nominated
"Serves You Right" – Jetty Road	Lee Bowman, Paula Bowman, Chris Burke-Gaffney, Keith MacPherson, Alexander Ross, Julian Sammut	—N/a	Nominated

=== Dance Work of the Year ===
Title and/or artist	Writer(s)	Publisher(s)	Result
"Finally See Our Way" – Art vs. Science	James Finn, Daniel McNamee, Daniel Williams	Kobalt Music Publishing Australia Pty Ltd	Nominated
"From the Music" – The Potbelleez	David Greene, Ilan Kidron, Marisa Lock, Jonathan Murphy, Justin Shave	Universal Music Publishing Pty Ltd obo MCDJ Music, Universal Music Publishing Pty Ltd	Won
"Sunlight" – Bag Raiders	Daniel Black, Jack Glass, Christopher Stracey	Sony, ATV Music Publishing Australia Pty Ltd, Universal Music Publishing Pty Ltd	Nominated
"Titanium" – David Guetta featuring Sia	Sia Furler (aka Sia), David Guetta, Giorgio Tuinfort, Nick Van De Wall	EMI Music Publishing Australia Pty Ltd, J Albert and Son Pty Ltd, Sony, ATV Music Publishing Australia Pty Ltd, Mushroom Music Pty Ltd	Nominated
"We Run the Night" – Havana Brown	Cassie Davis, Sean Mullins (aka Snob Scrilla or Sean Ray)	Universal Music Publishing Pty Ltd	Nominated

=== International Work of the Year ===
Title and/or artist	Writer(s)	Publisher(s)	Result
"Animal" – Neon Trees	Christopher Allen, Branden Campbell, Elaine Doty, Tyler Glenn, Timothy Pagnotta	Mushroom Music Pty Ltd	Nominated
"Moves Like Jagger" – Maroon 5 featuring Christina Aguilera	Adam Levine, Benjamin Levin, Ammar Malik, Johan Schuster	Universal Music Publishing MGB Australia Pty Ltd, Kobalt Music Publishing Australia Pty Ltd	Nominated
"Party Rock Anthem" – LMFAO	Skyler Gordy, Stefan Gordy, David Listenbee, Peter Schroeder	Kobalt Music Publishing Australia Pty Ltd	Won
"Price Tag" – Jessie J featuring B.o.B	Jessie J, Lukasz Gottwald (aka Dr. Luke), Claude Kelly, B.o.B	Sony, ATV Music Publishing Australia Pty Ltd, Kobalt Music Publishing Australia Pty Ltd, Warner, Chappell Music Australia Pty Ltd, Universal/MCA Music Publishing Pty Ltd	Nominated
"Rolling in the Deep" – Adele	Adele Adkins (aka Adele), Paul Epworth	Universal Music Publishing Pty Ltd, EMI Music Publishing Australia Pty Ltd	Nominated

=== Most Played Australian Work ===
Title and/or artist	Writer(s)	Publisher(s)	Result
"From the Music" – The Potbelleez	David Greene, Ilan Kidron, Marisa Lock, Jonathan Murphy, Justin Shave	Universal Music Publishing Pty Ltd obo MCDJ Music, Universal Music Publishing Pty Ltd	Nominated
"Own This Club" – Marvin Priest	Antonio Egizii, David Musumeci, Marvin Priest	EMI Music Publishing Australia Pty Ltd, Universal Music Publishing Pty Ltd	Nominated
"She's Like a Comet" – Jebediah	Christopher Daymond, Brett Mitchell, Kevin Mitchell (aka Bob Evans), Vanessa Thornton	Sony, ATV Music Publishing Australia Pty Ltd	Nominated
"Somebody That I Used to Know" – Gotye featuring Kimbra	Wally de Backer (aka Gotye), Luiz Bonfá	J Albert and Son Pty Ltd, Warner, Chappell Music Australia Pty Ltd	Won
"Wild at Heart" – Birds of Tokyo	Anthony Jackson, Ian Kenny, Adam Spark, Adam Weston	Mushroom Music Pty Ltd	Nominated

=== Rock Work of the Year ===
Title and/or artist	Writer(s)	Publisher(s)	Result
"Heartbreak Made Me a Killer" – Short Stack	Shaun Diviney	Sunday Morning Music administered by Mushroom Music Publishing Pty Ltd	Nominated
"Love Is a Drug" – Eskimo Joe	Stuart MacLeod, Joel Quartermain, Kav Temperley	Mushroom Music Pty Ltd	Nominated
"She's Like a Comet" – Jebediah	Christopher Daymond, Brett Mitchell, Kevin Mitchell, Vanessa Thornton	Sony, ATV Music Publishing Australia Pty Ltd	Nominated
"Switch Me On" – Shannon Noll	Benji Madden, Joel Madden, Shannon Noll, Lindsay Rimes	EMI Music Publishing Australia Pty Ltd	Nominated
"Wild at Heart" – Birds of Tokyo	Anthony Jackson, Ian Kenny, Adam Spark, Adam Weston	Mushroom Music Pty Ltd	Won

=== Song of the Year ===
Title and/or artist	Writer(s)	Publisher(s)	Result
"Brother" – Matt Corby	Matt Corby	Mushroom Music Pty Ltd obo Rocky Lane Music LLP	Nominated
"Cameo Lover" – Kimbra	Kimbra Johnson	Warner, Chappell Music Australia Pty Ltd obo WB Music Corp	Nominated
"(Oh Well) That's What You Get (Falling in Love with a Cowboy)" – Lanie Lane	Lanie Lane	Ivy League Music administered by Mushroom Music Pty Ltd	Nominated
"Somebody That I Used to Know" – Gotye featuring Kimbra	Wally de Backer, Luiz Bonfá	J Albert and Son Pty Ltd, Warner, Chappell Music Australia Pty Ltd	Won
"You Should Consider Having Sex with a Bearded Man" – The Beards	Joel McMillan	—N/a	Nominated

=== Urban Work of the Year ===
Title and/or artist	Writer(s)	Publisher(s)	Result
"Own This Club" – Marvin Priest	Antonio Egizii, David Musumeci, Marvin Priest	EMI Music Publishing Australia Pty Ltd, Universal Music Publishing Pty Ltd	Won
"Reflections" – Bliss n Eso	Noam Dishon, Max MacKinnon, Jonathan Notley	Mushroom Music Pty Ltd	Nominated
"Simple Man" – Diafrix featuring Daniel Merriweather	Khaled Abdulwahab, Kaelyn Behr, Glen Christiansen, Mohamed Komba, Daniel Merriweather	Mushroom Music Pty Ltd, Sony, ATV Music Publishing Australia Pty Ltd, Universal Music Publishing Pty Ltd obo Marlin Publishing Pty Ltd	Nominated
"Sing It (The Life of Riley)" – Drapht	Daniel Rankine, Paul Ridge	Sony, ATV Music Publishing Australia Pty Ltd obo Blue Max Music Publishing, Kobalt Music Publishing Australia Pty Ltd	Nominated
"Throw It Away" – 360 featuring Josh Pyke	Kaelyn Behr, Matthew Colwel	Sony, ATV Music Publishing Australia Pty Ltd, Universal Music Publishing Pty Ltd	Nominated

=== Most Played Australia Work Overseas ===
Title and/or artist	Writer(s)	Publisher(s)	Result
"Highway to Hell" – AC/DC	Angus Young, Malcolm Young, Ronald Scott	J Albert & Son	Won

=== Songwriter of the Year ===
- Gotye

=== Ted Albert Award for Outstanding Services to Australian Music ===
- Mary Lopez

== Art Music Awards ==
=== Work of the Year – Instrumental ===
Title	Composer	Performer	Result
Flesh and Ghost	Anthony Pateras	Speak Percussion	Nominated
...out of Obscurity	Elliott Gyger	Zubin Kanga	Nominated
Qinoth	Paul Stanhope	ACO2, Australian Chamber Orchestra's young artists' training ensemble led by Dale Barltrop	Nominated
Sextet	Brett Dean	Australia Ensemble	Won

=== Work of the Year – Jazz ===
Title	Composer	Performer	Result
Affectations	Andrea Keller	Bennetts Lane Big Band	Won
Dissolve for Two Pianos	Tom O'Halloran	Tom O'Halloran, Graham Wood	Nominated
Unknowness 1	Peter Knight	Peter Knight (trumpet and laptop), Adam Simmons (contra bass clarinet), Frank Di Sario (double bass), Erik Griswold (prepared piano), Vanessa Tomlinson (percussion), Joe Talia (drum kit and electronics)	Nominated
River Meeting Suite	Jeremy Rose	Compass Saxophone Quartet plus Bobby Singh and Sarangan Sriranganthan	Nominated

=== Work of the Year – Orchestral ===
Title	Composer	Performer	Result
Gardener of Time	Barry Conyngham	Melbourne Symphony Orchestra	Nominated
Missa Solis – Requiem for Eli	Nigel Westlake; text: John Weiley, Hannie Rayson & Michael Cathcart	Sydney Symphony Orchestra, Nigel Westlake (conductor)	Won
Spirit Ground	Ross Edwards	West Australian Symphony Orchestra, Margaret Blades (soloist)	Nominated
The Shining Island	Peter Sculthorpe		Nominated

=== Work of the Year – Vocal or Choral ===
Title	Composer / librettist	Performer	Result
Blackwood	Iain Grandage	Sara Macliver (soprano), Allan Meyer (clarinet), Graeme Gilling (piano)	Nominated
Osanna Mass	Clare Maclean	Sydney Chamber Choir, Paul Stanhope (conductor)	Won
Pomegranate Friends	Gerardo Dirie	Fusion Vocal Ensemble	Nominated
Sacred Kingfisher Psalms	Ross Edwards	The Song Company	Nominated

=== Performance of the Year ===
Title	Composer / librettist	Performer	Result
Stille Sprache	Andrew Schultz	Felicitas Fuchs, Qian Zhou, Bernard Lanskey	Nominated
Piano Sonata No 3	Lawrence Whiffin	Michael Kieran Harvey	Nominated
Missa Solis – Requiem for Eli	Nigel Westlake / John Weiley, Hannie Rayson, Michael Cathcart	Sydney Symphony Orchestra, Nigel Westlake (conductor)	Nominated
Two Memorials for Anton Webern and John Lennon	James Ledger	West Australian Symphony Orchestra, Paul Daniel (conductor)	Won

=== Award for Excellence by an Organisation or an Individual ===
Organisation / individual	Work	Result
Arcko Symphonic Project	2011 Concert Series	Nominated
Claire Edwardes	Flash: Marimba Miniatures recording project	Won
Graeme Morton	Services to Australian Music	Nominated
Speak Percussion	2011 Annual Program	Nominated

=== Award for Excellence in Music Education ===
Organisation / individual	Work	Result
Gondwana Choirs	2011 Program	Won
Graeme Morton	Contribution to music education through St Peters Chorale	Nominated
Kirsty Beilharz	Diffuse series of educational concerts in 2011	Nominated
Moorambilla Voices	Education strategy in North Western NSW	Nominated

=== Award for Excellence in a Regional Area ===
Organisation / individual	Work	Result
Creative Regions	The Crushing: A Gothic Opera	Nominated
Gondwana Choirs	Cairns Residency Project	Nominated
Moorambilla Voices	Engagement with local community	Won
Queensland Music Festival	Ailan Kores	Nominated

=== Award for Excellence in Experimental Music ===
Organisation / individual	Work	Result
Daniel Blinkhorn	2011 Composition Activities	Nominated
Decibel	PICA Performance Series	Nominated
Madeleine Flynn, Tim Humphrey	2011 activities	Won
Super Critical Mass	2011 activities	Nominated

=== Award for Excellence in Jazz ===
Organisation / individual	Work	Result
Andrea Keller	Contribution to Australian Jazz	Nominated
Quentin Angus	Composition, performance and international development	Won
Tom O'Halloran	Piano Perspectives concert performance of Dissolve	Nominated
Troy Roberts	Compositions Siarus and Oscar and the Shoe Box	Nominated

=== Distinguished Services to Australian Music ===
Organisation / individual	Result
Peter Sculthorpe	Won

== Screen Music Awards ==
=== International Achievement Award ===
Organisation / individual	Result
Bruce Beresford	Won

=== Feature Film Score of the Year ===
Title	Composer	Result
Burning Man	Lisa Gerrard	Won
Needle	Jamie Blanks	Nominated
Santa's Apprentice	Nerida Tyson-Chew	Nominated
Storms Surfers 3D	Richard Tognetti, Michael Yezerski	Nominated

=== Best Music for an Advertisement ===
Title	Composer	Result
Bundy Rum – "Ain't no Nancy Drink"	Andrew Page, Ramesh Sathiah	Nominated
Levi's – "Levi's X Korea National Ballet"	Rafael May	Nominated
Nutrilon – "Hope"	Haydn Walker	Won
Volkswagen Tiguan – "Cross Country"	Elliott Wheeler	Nominated

=== Best Music for Children's Television ===
Title	Composer	Result
AH	Henrique Dib	Nominated
Gasp!	Ryan Grogan, Hylton Mowday	Won
Hootabelle	Lior	Nominated
My Place – Season 2: Episode 8 – "Sarah 1798"	Roger Mason	Nominated

=== Best Music for a Documentary ===
Title	Composer	Result
Gallipoli from Above	Dale Cornelius	Nominated
Seduction in the City: The Birth of Shopping	Caitlin Yeo	Nominated
The Impossible Lens: The True Story of Dr Jim Frazier	Russell Thornton	Nominated
Tiger Dynasty	Brett Aplin	Won

=== Best Music for a Mini-Series or Telemovie ===
Title	Composer	Result
Beaconsfield	Stephen Rae	Nominated
Dripping in Chocolate	Matteo Zingales	Nominated
Mabo	Antony Partos	Won
The Slap	Antony Partos	Nominated

=== Best Music for a Short Film ===
Title	Composer	Result
Aurora	Christopher Larkin	Nominated
Boston Tommy	Jonathan Dreyfus	Nominated
My Constellation	Bruce Heald	Nominated
This Dog's Life	Roger Mason	Won

=== Best Music for a Television Series or Serial ===
Series or Serial	Episode title	Composer	Result
Miss Fisher's Murder Mysteries		Greg J. Walker	Nominated
Who Do You Think You Are?	"Vince Colosimo"	Ash Gibson Greig	Nominated
Wild Boys		Michael Lira, David McCormack	Nominated
Underbelly: Razor		Burkhard Dallwitz	Won

=== Best Original Song Composed for the Screen ===
Song title	Work	Composer	Result
"Animula Vagula"	Exitus Roma	Leah Curtis	Nominated
"Hey Hootabelle"	Giggle and Hoot	Lior	Won
"Love Finds a Way"	Shopping	Will Kuether, Russell Thornton	Nominated
"The Goodnight Song"	The Disney Channel	Kylie Burtland, Chloe Cassidy	Nominated

=== Best Soundtrack Album ===
Title	Composer	Result
Cloudstreet	Bryony Marks	Nominated
The Slap	Michael Lira, Jono Ma, Antony Partos, Irine Vela	Won
The Straits	David Bridie	Nominated
Underbelly: Razor	Burkhard Dallwitz	Nominated

=== Best Television Theme ===
Title	Composer	Result
Guess How Much I Love You	Ryan Grogan, Hylton Mowday	Nominated
Miss Fisher's Murder Mysteries	Greg J. Walker	Nominated
My Sri Lanka with Peter Kuruvita	Vicki Hansen	Nominated
The Slap	Antony Partos	Won

=== Most Performed Screen Composer – Australia ===
Composer	Result
Adam Gock, Dinesh Wicks	Won
Anthony El Ammar	Nominated
Jay Stewart	Nominated
Neil Sutherland	Nominated

=== Most Performed Screen Composer – Overseas ===
Composer	Result
Alastair Ford	Nominated
David Hirschfelder	Nominated
Neil Sutherland	Won
Ric Formosa, Ricky Edwards	Nominated
