= Pensacola Beach Songwriters Festival =

Music festival in Florida, United States

The Pensacola Beach Songwriters Festival is a music festival held annually in Pensacola Beach, Florida, US.

== History ==
The festival was founded in 2009 by songwriter Jim Pasquale and Reneda Cross Pasquale. Cross Pasquale volunteered with the Frank Brown Songwriters Festival for 15 years before co-founding the Pensacola Beach Songwriters Festival.

The event has grown from a single day event to a larger event featuring more than 150 songwriters and held across several days and at multiple venues at Pensacola Beach, Florida.

Prominent songwriters featured in the schedule of recent festivals include Gary Baker, Bob DiPiero, Anthony Smith, Jeffrey Steele, Wynn Varble, Brian White, and Phillip White. In 2026, the Pensacola Beach Songwriters Festival schedule was cut short by three days due to the impact of Hurricane Isaias.

In 2024, the Pensacola Beach Songwriters Festival introduced a national songwriting competition. Grand Prize winners include Jessey Adams, "When The Drinker Prays" (2024), J.M. Clifford, "Complicated Man" (2025) and Lucie Tiger, "Harvest Moon" (2026).
