= Rockhampton Hangover =

2026 album by Tom Busby

Studio album by Tom Busby
- Released: 20 February 2026
- Recorded: Texas Hill Country
- Studios: Dripping Springs, Texas
- Length: 30:39
- Label: Tom Busby
- Producer: Ben Kweller

Singles from Rockhampton Hangover
- 1. "Waiting for Tomorrow" Released: 5 March 2025; 2. "Someone Strong" Released: 14 April 2025; 3. "Cyclone" Released: 23 May 2025; 4. "Lottery" Released: 1 August 2025; 5. "In the Dark" Released: 3 October 2025; 6. "My Senses" Released: 21 November 2025; 7. "Crazy" Released: 20 February 2026

Rockhampton Hangover is the debut studio album by the Australian musician Tom Busby. The album was mentioned as early as March 2025 but officially announced in October 2025. The album includes the singles "Waiting for Tomorrow", "Someone Strong", "Cyclone", "Lottery", "In the Dark", "My Senses" and "Crazy". It was released on 20 February 2026.

Upon release Busby said, "I'm seriously pumped this record's finally out. Making it with Ben Kweller was a turning point for me as an artist. He challenged me, backed me and helped me dig deeper than I probably would've on my own. These songs were born in Rockhampton, through some of the best days and some pretty tough ones too. To now send a piece of Rocky out into the world… that feels massive." " Busby said the title refers to the "hangover" that "comes after a tough chapter, when the truth hits, and you decide to move forward."

The album debuted at number 3 on the ARIA Charts.

The album won The Triffid 2026 Queensland Album of the Year.

== Background and release ==
In an interview with Noise11 in March 2026, Busby confessed the idea for a solo album predates the formation of Busby Marou with Jeremy Marou in 2007. After Busby Marou's fifth studio album, Blood Red in 2023, Busby finally committed to recording a solo album. The watershed moment came when Busby traveled to Texas, United States to write with Ben Kweller, which was prolific and led to Kweller producing and recording the album at his studio in Dripping Springs. Both families were living on the property during the recording.

== Reception ==
ABC Country said "Rockhampton Hangover displays Tom Busby's raw, authoritative vocals and his gift for telling deeply human stories. It is certain to cement his place as a distinct and compelling voice in country music," and called the album "his most personal and unfiltered work to date."

Paul Cashmere from Noise11 said, "Rockhampton Hangover sharpens Tom's focus, revealing the scars beneath the surface and trusting the songs to carry their own weight. It is a confident, quietly compelling debut that stands comfortably alongside his work with Busby Marou while carving out a space that is unmistakably his own."

== Track listing ==
All lyrics are written by Thomas Busby.

Rockhampton Hangover track listing
No.	Title	Music	Length
1.	"Cyclone"	Busby; Benjamin Kweller	3:20
2.	"Waiting for Tomorrow" (featuring Ben Kweller)	Busby; Kweller	2:12
3.	"Crazy"	Busby; Kweller	2:54
4.	"My Senses"	Busby; Kweller; Ben Abraham	2:18
5.	"Stalemate"	Busby; Kweller; Robert Conley	3:16
6.	"Lottery"	Busby; Kweller; Andy Hopkins	3:22
7.	"In the Dark"	Busby; Kweller; Chris Collins	3:54
8.	"Build Tough"	Busby; Kweller; Jordie Lane; Clare Reynolds	2:47
9.	"Someone Strong"	Busby; Kweller; Evan Jones	3:02
10.	"Nothing Will Ever Be the Same"	Busby; Kweller; Conley	3:34
Total length:			30:39

== Personnel ==
Credits adapted from Tidal.

- Thomas Busby – vocals
- Ben Kweller – production, engineering, vocals on "Waiting for Tomorrow"
- Jackson Baker – engineering
- Steve Mazur – engineering
- Howie Weinberg – mastering
- Evan Jones – engineering on "Someone Strong"

== Charts ==
Chart performance for Rockhampton Hangover
Chart (2026)	Peak position
Australian Albums (ARIA)	3
