= Jetty Road =

Jetty Road may refer to:

- Jetty Road (band)
- Jetty Road, Glenelg
