= Blood Red =

Blood red is a color.

Blood Red may also refer to:

- Blood Red (film), a 1989 American-British Western drama film directed by Peter Masterson
- Blood Red (novel), a fantasy novel written by Mercedes Lackey
- "Blood Red", a song by Slayer on the album Seasons in the Abyss
- Blood Red (album), a 2023 album by Australian duo Busby Marou
- "Blood Red" (Midnight Caller), a 1989 television episode
