= 11th Annual Josie Music Awards =

US music awards ceremony in 2025

- Date: November 2, 2025
- Location: Grand Ole Opry House; Nashville, Tennessee, U.S.
- Hosted by: Josie Passantino-Boone; Tinamarie Passantino
- Website: josiemusicawards.com

The 11th Annual Josie Music Awards ceremony was held on November 2, 2025, at the Grand Ole Opry House (in Nashville, Tennessee, United States), honoring independent music artists, songwriters, and industry professionals. Lorrie Morgan was honored with the Lifetime Career Achievement Award and Steve Dorff was honored with the Songwriter Legend Award.

== Winners ==
Achievement Awards

- Lifetime Career Achievement Award: Lorrie Morgan
- Songwriter Legend Award: Steve Dorff
- Humanitarian Organization of the Year: Wings of Rescue

JMA Award

- JMA Icon Award: EG Daily
- The JMA Tex Ritter Award: The Malpass Brothers

Entertainer of the Year

- Artist: JD Shelburne
- Duo/Group: The Almas

Artist of the Year

- Multi-Genre Male: Chad Johnson
- Rock: Jasmine Cain
- Country Female: EmiSunshine
- Modern/Pop Country Female: McKayla Prew
- Outlaw Country: Josh Davis
- R&B/Soul: Shylah Ray
- Americana/Folk Male: Brian Allison
- Southern Rock/Country Rock Female: Krystal King
- Southern Rock/Country Rock Male: Brooks Herring
- Under 18 Alumni: Tege Holt
- Under 18: Tristan Roberson
- Pop Rock: Tim Ringer
- Americana/Folk Female: Samantha Grimes
- Gospel/Christian/Inspirational: Shellem Cline
- Jazz/Blues: Travis Bowlin
- Multi-Genre Female: Clare Cunningham
- Country Male: Waylon Hanel
- Country Male Alumni: Chad Bushnell
- Modern/Pop Country Male: Jake Bradley
- Traditional/Classic Country: B.J. Jamison
- Pop/Dance/Contemporary: Alyssa Jacey
- World: Love Itoya
- Emergent Artist of the Year: John Eason
- Emergent Artist of the Year – Country Female: Presley Puig
- Emergent Artist of the Year – Country Male: Caden Wilson

Rising Star of the Year

- Rising Star of the Year Female: Robyn Ashley
- Rising Star of the Year Male: Garrett Huffman
- Rising Star of the Year – Modern Country/Pop Country Female: Jacki Daniels
- Rising Star of the Year – Country Female: Ashley Brooks
- Rising Star of the Year – Country Male: Kevin Thomas
- Rising Star of the Year – Country Mix Male: Travis Reigh

Duo/Group of the Year

- Artist/Duo/Group of the Year Children’s: Kathryn the Grape
- Duo of the Year – Americana: Sugarcane Jane
- Duo of the Year – Country: Cliff & Susan
- Group of the Year – Country: Matt Tejeda and The Backwoods Band
- Group of the Year – Multi-Genre: Crooked Eye Tommy
- Group of the Year – Bluegrass: Carolina Bluegrass Style
- Group of the Year – Americana: Andrew Moore and Hooch
- Group of the Year – Hard Rock/Metal: Lost Circus
- Duo of the Year – Multi-Genre: Harmony Holler
- Duo/Group of the Year – Gospel: Riven
- Group of the Year – Country/Rock: The Jess Zimmerman Band
- Group of the Year – Southern Rock: Greye
- Group of the Year – Outlaw Country: Cody Ikerd and the Sidewinders
- Group of the Year – Blues: King Bee & The Stingers
- Group of the Year – Alternative/Indie/Pop Rock: Defeated
- Group of the Year – Rock: 'The Goldy LockS Band

Vocalist/Vocal Event of the Year

- Vocal Event of the Year – Male/Female Collaboration: Kirstie Kraus, Mike Nash "Largo"
- Vocal Event of the Year: Andrew Chappell and Dave Nudo "I’m All In"
- Vocalist of the Year – Multi-Genre Female: Abbie Thomas
- Vocalist of the Year – Multi-Genre Male: Chase Bush
- Vocalist of the Year – R&B/Soul: Teri Tobin
- Vocalist of the Year – Jazz/Blues: Lauren Anderson
- Vocalist of the Year – Americana/Folk Female: Jayna Jennings
- Vocalist of the Year – Americana/Folk Male: Jimmy Bowen
- Vocalist of the Year – Outlaw: Danny Spiro
- Vocalist of the Year – Rock/Metal Male: Chris O’Brien
- Vocalist of the Year – Modern Country Male Alumni: Barefoot Joe
- Vocalist of the Year – Modern Country: Kevin Wolff
- Vocalist of the Year – Country Female Alumni I: Carrie Brockwell
- Vocalist of the Year – Country Male Alumni I: Rob Cole
- Vocalist of the Year – Country Male I: Travis Thamert
- Vocalist of the Year – Under 18 Alumni: Robert Levey II
- Vocalist of the Year – Under 18: Zoey Rae
- Vocalist of the Year – Pop: Jack Austin
- Vocalist of the Year – Pop/Rock: River Gibson
- Vocalist of the Year – Adult Contemporary: Lacy Miller
- Vocalist of the Year – Gospel/Christian/Inspirational Female: Cece Manuela
- Vocalist of the Year – Gospel/Christian/Inspirational Male: Whitlee Casey
- Vocalist of the Year – Bluegrass: Tianna Lefebvre
- Vocalist of the Year – Country Rock/Southern Rock Male: Scott Boyd
- Vocalist of the Year – Country Rock/Southern Rock Female: Tobi Lee
- Vocalist of the Year – Rock/Metal Female: Chelsea Calloway
- Vocalist of the Year – Modern Country Female Alumni: Christine Radlmann
- Vocalist of the Year – Traditional/Classic Country: Eric Diamond
- Vocalist of the Year – Country Female I: Lucie Tiger
- Vocalist of the Year – Country Female II: Audra McLaughlin
- Vocalist of the Year – Country Male II: Cody Glenn Cox
- Vocalist of the Year – Country Female Alumni II: Jenny Grace
- Vocalist of the Year – Country Male Alumni II: Caleb Kelley

Songwriter of the Year

- Songwriter of the Year – Personal Portfolio Female Alumni: Erin Stoll
- Songwriter of the Year – Personal Portfolio Female: Ashley Jordan
- Songwriter of the Year – Personal Portfolio Male Alumni: Andru Jamison
- Songwriter of the Year – Corey Lee Barker
- Songwriter of the Year – Personal & Pitching Portfolio Female: Sheri Swartz
- Songwriter of the Year – Personal Portfolio Male: Aaron Hymes
- Songwriter of the Year – Personal & Pitching Portfolio Male: Brad McKinney

Music Video of the Year

- Story-Enhanced Performance Video of the Year: “If I Sin For You?” Celeste Marie Wilson
- Story-Enhanced Performance Video of the Year Male: “Mama Never Liked The Rodeo,” Eric Lee Beddingfield
- Story Enhanced Performance Video of the Year Duo/Group/Collabs: “I Didn’t Know,” The Goldy LockS Band Feat. Mickie James & The Lacs
- Music Video of the Year Performance Focused Duo/Group: “The Will,” Nu-Blu
- Music Video of the Year Performance Focused Female: “The Bitter End,” Brenda Best
- Music Video of the Year Performance Focused Male: “Damn Good Time,” Jordan Moore
- Social Impact Video of the Year Duo/Group/Collab: “High Heel On The Pedal,” Ashlie Amber Feat. Velvet Rodeo
- Social Impact Video of the Year Male: “I’m Sorry,” Chuck Thomas
- Social Impact Video of the Year Female: “Stardust,” Shy Blossom
- Expressive Verse Video of the Year: “Make Canada Great Again,” Rudy Gunn
- Music Video of the Year Duo/Group/Collab: “Taste The Whiskey, ” Eric Lee Beddingfield with Jesse Keith Whitley
- Music Video of the Year Female: “Gunfire,” Remington Mae
- Music Video of the Year Male: “Wishing Well,” Louie Lee
- Music and Video Projects Children’s: “Baby Ninja,” Kelli Welli
- Music Video of the Year Female Alumni: “Mind Your Own Backyard,” Krystal King
- Music Video of the Year Male Alumni: “White Trash Like Me,” Joey Ferris
- Best Actress in A Music Video: Krystal King, “Mind Your Own Backyard”
- Best Actress in A Music Video: Megan Vanlandingham, “Heaven’s Front Porch”
- Best Actor in A Music Video: Howie Garoutte, “Why Am I Here”
- Best Actor in A Music Video: Country Kid Nikko, “Wishing Well”

Musician of the Year

- Musician of the Year – Banjo: Dustin Terpenning
- Musician of the Year – Brass/Woodwind: Evangelos Carydakis' (Saxophone)
- Musician of the Year – Multi-Instrumentalist: EJ Edward Ouellette
- Musician of the Year – Strings: Kyle Roop (Pedal Steel) * Musician of the Year – Bass: Charlie Frie
- Musician of the Year – Keys: MarQ Andrew Speck
- Musician of the Year – Piano: Dr. Tedrin Blair Lindsay
- Musician of the Year – Piano/Keys Alumni: Ed Bazel
- Musician of the Year – Drums/Percussion: Squeak Melusky
- Musician of the Year – Drums/Percussion Alumni: AJ Newton
- Musician of the Year – Guitar I: David Jones
- Musician of the Year – Guitar II: Terence Young
- Musician of the Year – Guitar III: Damon Mitchell

Song of the Year

- Song of the Year – Social Impact – Female: ”Forever 13,” Khloe Grace
- Song of the Year – Social Impact – Female Alumni: “The Sacrifice,” Alyssa Ruffin
- Song of the Year – Social Impact – Male: “Buy Me A Memory,” Chet Lawrence
- Song of the Year – Social Impact : “Stand,” Kathryn Shipley, Lee Newton, Nita Perez, Dimitris Nezis, Holly Fischer, Frank Fasano, Phil Kanakis
- Song of the Year – Holiday: “Cause It’s Christmas,” Revele and Family
- Song of the Year – Bluegrass: “Light In My Life,” Jackson Hollow
- Song of the Year – Alumni – Christian/Gospel/Inspirational: “Wonderful Work,” Jason Lee McKinney Band
- Song of the Year – Gospel/Christian/Inspirational: “Glory To God,” Woodshed Revival
- Song of the Year – Rock/Alt Rock/Metal: “Walk All Over Me,” Brett Ryder
- Song of the Year – Rock/Alt Rock/Metal Individual Alumni: “Ghost,” Spencer Ezell
- Song of the Year – Rock/Alt Rock/Metal Duo/Group Alumni: “Lifeline,” The Almas
- Song of the Year – Southern Rock/Country Rock Alumni: “Not Ready,” Jake Nelson
- Song of the Year – Southern Rock/Country Rock: “Dead Man Running,” Drifted Harmony
- Song of the Year – Pop/Rock: “Forever,” The Swansons
- Song of the Year – Folk: “Sweet Mountain Music,” Them Lasses
- Song of the Year – Americana Female: “Hercules,” Sam Hatmaker Feat. EmiSunshine
- Song of the Year – Americana Male: “Worth Breaking,” Brian Allison
- Song of the Year – Americana Duo/Group/Collab: “Pretty Lights of Denver,” Weary Ramblers
- Song of the Year – Outlaw: “Time To Say Goodbye,” Blackwood Mojo
- Song of the Year – World/New Age World: “Smile,” Cecy Santana
- Song of the Year – Instrumental: “Tyrone Blues,” D Boone Pittman
- Song of the Year – Multi-Genre: “Heaven’s Front Porch,” Flatline
- Song of the Year – Pop/Adult Contemporary: “When I’m With You,” Faith Lee
- Song of the Year – Pop Alumni I: “Love You More and More,” Kim Kameron, Darick DDS Spears
- Song of the Year – Jazz/Blues: “Just Walk Away,” Derrick Dove & The Peacekeepers
- Song of the Year – R&B/Soul: “Send Me Love,” Markey Blue
- Song of the Year – Hip Hop: “My Heart,” Irene Michaels Feat. Twizm Whyte Piece
- Song of the Year – Traditional/Classic Country Male: “Don’t Forget, Remember Me,” Webb Dalton
- Song of the Year – Traditional/Classic Country Female: “That’s The Way Love Goes,” Paula Buchanan
- Song of the Year – Country Female Alumni: “I told Her For Him,” Rylee Austin
- Song of the Year – Country Female I: “Nashville Don’t Forget Me,” Elisa Smith
- Song of the Year – Country Male Alumni I: “Can’t Be Roped,” Sam Stinson
- Song of the Year – Country Male I: “Sundown In A Small Town,” Shawn Richards
- Song of the Year – Country Male III: “Song On The Radio,” Elliott Booe
- Song of the Year – Country Female II: “Hate To Lie,” Lara Bell
- Song of the Year – Country Male Alumni II: “Sweet Home Tennessee,” Robert Abernathy
- Song of the Year – Country Male II: “Make It To Nashville,” Trey Bryant
- Song of the Year – Country Duo/Group/Collab: “Lives In The Whiskey,” Roseland
- Song of the Year – Modern Country/Pop Country Male: “Don’t Wanna See The Rain,” Clinton Wilkie
- Song of the Year – Modern Country/Pop Country Male Alumni: “Whatcha Gonna Do,” Brandon Lowe
- Song of the Year – Modern Country/Pop Country Female Alumni: “Mr. Wallen,” Ashlyn Greene
- Song of the Year – Modern Country/Pop Country Female: “Forgot Your Name,” McKenna Faith Winters
- Song of the Year – Children’s Music: “It’s Ok To Make Mistakes,” Irene Rose

Album/EP of the Year

- Album of the Year – Rock/Hard Rock/Alt Rock/Metal: “Attitude Is Everything,” Jasmine Cain
- Album of the Year – Pop/Contemporary/Dance: “Unbridled Angel,” Aaron Sidwell
- Album of the Year – Americana/Folk: “Not What I Do,” Laura Sawosko
- Album/EP of the Year – Instrumental: “Christmas Romance Instrumentals,” Corey Lee Barker
- Album/EP of the Year – Holiday: “That’s What Christmas Means To Me,” Robert Bacon
- Album/EP of the Year – Multi-Genre: “Not Gonna Lie,” Abbie Thomas
- Album/EP of the Year – Jazz/Blues: “Live From The Slippery Noodle,” King Bee & The Stingers
- Album/EP of the Year – Traditional/Classic Country: “Homesick,” Lee Newton
- Album/EP of the Year – Christian/Gospel/Inspirational: “Room With A View,” Brandon Hixson
- Album of the Year – Country: “Pushing Borders,” Matt Castillo
- Album of the Year – Country (Mixed Genre Sound): “When It’s All Said And Done,” Danny Terrell
- EP of the Year – Rock: “Obscura,” Brando Vanschoyck
- EP of the Year – Pop/Contemporary: “Elements,” CheraLee
- EP of the Year – Folk/Americana: “Casualties of a Life Well Lived,” Ashley Jordan
- EP of the Year – Country: “Under The Neon,” Dusty Moats

Best Performance

- Best Stage Performance: Mr. Talkbox
- Vocal Competition Winner At “Passantino’s": Gio

Tribute Band of the Year

- Tribute Band of the Year: Blank Space Tribute featuring Olivia Mojica – A Tribute to Taylor Swift
- Tribute Artist of the Year Female: Ashlie Amber Harris – Tribute to Whitney Houston
- Tribute Artist of the Year Male/Country: Keith Ormrod – Tribute to Kenny Chesney
- Tribute Artist of the Year Male: Don Suiters (Kid Kentucky) – Tribute to Kid Rock

Music Industry Professionals

- Record Label of the Year: Clarksville Sound
- PR/Promotion Company: 2911 Media
- Music Venue of the Year: Ranchman’s (Calgary, Canada)
- Magazine of the Year: Cashbox Magazine
- Television Show/Station of the Year: American Country Network
- Podcast/Music Radio Show: Overtones LIVE Presented by Listen Locally
- Studio/Production Company of the Year: TuneDesigner
- Artist Management Company of the Year: Midwest Artist Group
- Solo Artist Representative of the Year: DLS Music
- Live Show Productions of the Year: The Coyote Store
- Photographer of the Year: Janet Reynolds Photography
- Music Business of the Year: Kincaid-Gooch Voice Studio
- Radio Station of the Year: Sterling Country Radio
- Music Producer of the Year: Dr. Ted Olson

Fan's Choice

- Fan’s Choice Female: Macy Tabor
- Fan’s Choice Female: EV Mae
- Fan’s Choice Male: David Krantz
- Fan’s Choice Male: Adam Calvert
- Fan’s Choice Duo/Group: Kentucky Just Us
- Fan’s Choice Duo/Group: Matt Clarkson Band

Songwriter Achievement Winners

- "She Is Talking With Her Eyes" – Paul Overstreet, Rory Feek
- "Midnights" – Thornton Cline, Sassy VeZay, Michael Jay
- "Good To Be Blessed" – Corey Lee Barker, Loretta Jent
- "Bad Chemistry" – Austin McKedy, Tracie McKedy, Mackynsie McKedy
- "Higher" – Danny Kensy
- "Right Mind at the Wrong Time" – Brad Morgan, Royce Johns
- "Fly" – Kelsie Kratins
- "Here's to the Man in Red" – Cara Paige, Justine Blazer, Corey Lee Barker
- "Honky-Tonk Withdrawal" – John Bielecki, Brandon Maddox
- "Enlightenment" – Erin Sliney
