= Marvin Priest =

Australian singer-songwriter (born 1981)

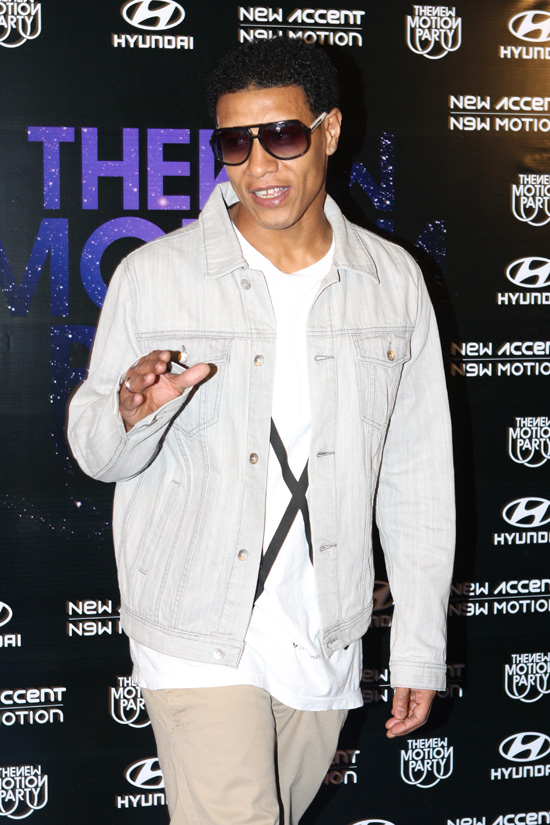
- Marvin Priest, Luna Park Sydney, October 2011

Background information
- Born: Marvin Cornell Elliott; 27 October 1981 (age 44); Lewisham, London, England
- Genres: R&B, pop, reggae fusion
- Occupations: Singer, songwriter
- Instrument: Vocals
- Years active: 2007–present
- Label: Island
- Website: marvinpriest.com.au

Marvin Cornell Elliott (born 27 October 1981), better known by his stage name Marvin Priest, is a British-born, Australian-based singer-songwriter. In November 2011 Priest released his debut studio album, Beats & Blips, in Australia, which spawned the top ten single "Own This Club" on the ARIA Singles Chart, as well as top 100 singles "Take Me Away" and "Feel the Love". "Own This Club" was also a top ten hit in New Zealand. At the APRA Music Awards of 2012 the track, which was co-written by Priest with Antonio Egizii and David Musumeci (of DNA Songs), won an award for Urban Work of the Year and was nominated for Most Played Australian Work.

== Biography ==
=== 1981–2010: Early life and career beginnings ===
Marvin Priest was born as Marvin Cornell Elliott on 27 October 1981 in Lewisham, London, England and is the son of UK reggae singer Maxi Priest (born 10 June 1961). Priest has eight siblings and one of his younger brothers, Ryan Elliott, was in the UK boy band, Ultimate Kaos, which achieved chart success in the 1990s. Priest listened to R&B, hip-hop and reggae music and he travelled the world with his father and family.

In 2007, Priest first toured with UB40, performing as a backing vocalist at the Raggamuffin Music Festival. He has since worked with other artists. Priest co-wrote "Full Hundred" on his father's album 2 the Max (2005) and featured on "Childhood", a track from Maxi's album, Refused (2007). Priest appeared on UB40's album, TwentyFourSeven, co-writing "Slow Down" and featuring in "Dance Until the Morning Light" and a remix of "I Shot the Sheriff". After touring Australia in 2008, Priest set up connections with local club artists, and spent about half a year in the country. In 2010, Priest performed a duet with Ronan Keating for the latter's album, Duet, where they covered Cat Stevens' 1970 single "Wild World".

=== 2011–present: Breakthrough success and Beats & Blips ===
On 25 November 2011, Marvin Priest's debut album, Beats & Blips, was released in Australia on Island Records, but did not chart in Australia. In February that year, he had issued his breakthrough debut single "Own This Club", which peaked at number six on the ARIA Singles Chart and was certified double platinum by ARIA at year's end. It also reached the top ten on the New Zealand Singles Chart, peaking at number seven. The song was written as a collaboration with DNA Songs members Antonio Egizii and David Musumeci. His second single, "Take Me Away" featuring Wynter Gordon, was released on 22 July and peaked at number thirty-two on the ARIA Singles Chart, and was certified gold. "Feel the Love" featuring Fatman Scoop, the third single from Beats & Blips, was released on 25 October and peaked at number sixty in Australia.

=== Football ===
Priest has played semi-professional football, and in 2003 he played in the same team as his father Maxi Priest for non-league Southall FC.

== Discography ==
=== Albums ===
Year	Album details
2011	Beats & Blips: Released: 25 November 2011; Label: Universal; Format: CD, digital download

=== Singles ===
Year	Title	Peak chart positions		Certifications	Album
Year	Title	AUS	NZL	Certifications	Album
2011	"Own This Club"	6	7	AUS: 2× Platinum RMNZ: Gold	Beats & Blips
2011	"Take Me Away" (featuring Wynter Gordon)	32	—	AUS: Gold	Beats & Blips
2011	"Feel the Love" (featuring Fatman Scoop)	60	—	—	Beats & Blips
2020	"Tequila" (featuring Slicker 1)	—	—	—	—

== Awards and nominations ==
=== APRA Music Awards ===
Year	Type	Award	Result
2012	APRA Music Awards	Most Played Australian Work – "Own This Club" (Antonio Egizii, David Musumeci, Marvin Priest)	Nominated
2012	APRA Music Awards	Urban Work of the Year – "Own This Club" (Antonio Egizii, David Musumeci, Marvin Priest)	Won

=== Music Victoria Awards ===
The Music Victoria Awards are an annual awards night celebrating Victorian music. They commenced in 2005.

Year	Nominee / work	Award	Result
2018	himself	Best Reggae or Dance Hall Act	Nominated
2020	himself	Best Reggae or Dance Hall Act	Nominated
2021	himself	Best Reggae or Dance Hall Act	Nominated
