= Farewell Fitzroy =

Studio album by Busby Marou
- Released: 4 October 2013
- Label: Warner Music Australia
- Producer: Brad Jones

Busby Marou chronology
| Busby Marou (2010) | Farewell Fitzroy (2013) | Postcards from the Shell House (2017) |

Singles from Farewell Fitzroy
- 1. "Get You Out of Here" Released: 2013; 2. "Luck" Released: March 2014; 3. "My Second Mistake" Released: May 2014; 4. "Days of Gold" Released: October 2014

Farewell Fitzroy is the second studio album by Australian blues and roots band Busby Marou. The album was released in October 2013 and debuted at number 5 on the ARIA Charts. A "Days of Gold (Deluxe Edition)" was released a year later.

== Reception ==
Professional ratings
Review scores
| Source | Rating |
|---|---|
| The Australian | 4.5/5 stars |

Sarah Elks from The Australian said "Busby Marou neatly sidesteps the sophomore slump with Farewell Fitzroy, a rich, warm and joyful follow-up to their breakthrough debut.".

Good Morning Country said "Mandolins, ukulele and whistles – stories of travels across the globe, and the pull of home. Like catching up with old friends you've been hanging out to hear from, Farewell Fitzroy is Busby Marou's welcome return, the highly anticipated second album from the Queensland duo... Farewell Fitzroy is 12 tracks of folk-pop and country-tinged song craft, distinctly Australian storytelling, and the gifted musicianship of Tom Busby and Jeremy Marou."

== Track listing ==
| No. | Title | Length |
|---|---|---|
| 1. | "My Secret Mistake" | 3:37 |
| 2. | "Get You Out of Here" | 3:51 |
| 3. | "Keep Me" | 3:37 |
| 4. | "Cruel to Be Kind" | 2:35 |
| 5. | "Luck" | 4:00 |
| 6. | "Heard it All Before" | 3:08 |
| 7. | "Widow" | 4:37 |
| 8. | "Over My Dead Body" | 4:16 |
| 9. | "Game Plan" | 3:30 |
| 10. | "Leave it Up to Me" | 3:48 |
| 11. | "Wage a War" | 3:10 |
| 12. | "Waterlogged" | 2:42 |

Farewell Fitzroy — Days of Gold Deluxe edition (bonus tracks)
| No. | Title | Length |
|---|---|---|
| 13. | "Days of Gold" |
| 14. | "Heard it All Before" (acoustic) |
| 15. | "Widow" (acoustic) |
| 16. | "Biding My Time" (featuring Nat Dunn) |
| 17. | "Only You" |

== Charts ==
| Chart (2013) | Peak position |
|---|---|
| Australian Albums (ARIA) | 5 |

== Release history ==
| Region | Date | Format | Label | Catalogue | Edition |
|---|---|---|---|---|---|
| Australia | 4 October 2013 | CD; digital download | Warner Music Australia | 5310595582 | Original release |
| Australia | 17 October 2014 | CD; digital download | Warner Music Australia | 5419637705 | Days of Gold Edition |
