= Micaela Kleinsmith =

South African musician

- Born: 1996 (age 29–30); Cape Town, South Africa
- Genres: Country
- Instruments: vocals, guitar
- Years active: 2016–present
- Labels: Platoon on Apple Music

Micaela Kleinsmith is a country singer from Cape Town, South Africa and the first winner of the Apple TV+ reality competition series My Kind of Country.

== Early life ==
Kleinsmith was consistently bullied as a child, which reduced her confidence. She used music as a way to cope with bullying and to attract friends. She began to write songs at age 14.

== Career ==
In 2016, Kleinsmith competed on season 12 of Idols South Africa.

In 2023, Kleinsmith competed on My Kind of Country, after being scouted by Orville Peck for the opportunity. Kleinsmith was able to grow her confidence and stage presence throughout the show's eight episodes, leading to her winning the show's first season. Her prize was $100,000 and extensive advertising from Apple Music.

=== Influences ===
Kleinsmith has cited Carrie Underwood, Shania Twain, Pink, and Adele as her musical influences.

== Personal life ==
Kleinsmith is queer.

== Discography ==
Extended plays
Title	Year	Source
Butterfly	2023	

Singles
Title	Year	Source
"Over You"	2023	
"If I Die Young"	2023	
"Good Kisser"	2023	
"Summer Love"	2020	
"Will I Ever?"	2019	
