= Busby Marou =

Australian blues and roots duo

- Origin: Rockhampton, Queensland, Australia
- Genres: Blues, roots
- Years active: 2007–present
- Labels: Footstomp Music; Warner Australia
- Members: Thomas Busby; Jeremy Marou
- Website: www.busbymarou.com

Busby Marou (pronounced buz-bee ma-roo) are an Australian musical duo consisting of Thomas Busby and Jeremy Marou, from Rockhampton, Queensland. At the APRA Music Awards of 2012, the duo won "Blues & Roots Work of the Year" category for their single "Biding My Time", and they have gone on to win several other awards.

== Background ==
In 2007, Thomas Busby and Jeremy Marou met in Rockhampton. Jeremy is of Torres Strait Islander heritage, and both performers come from musical families. With similar musical interests, the two combined to perform and write music under the name Busby Marou.

== Career ==
Busby Marou's debut EP, The Blue Road, was recorded at Pete Murray's personal studios in Byron Bay and produced by Anthony Lycenko who had worked with artists such as Murray, David Bowie and Shifter. The EP had a limited release. Busby Marou supported Pete Murray during the Toowoomba leg of his 2008 Australian Tour.

In 2009 saw the duo as one of five successful applicants for "Breakthrough" – A Federal Government initiative supporting emerging indigenous contemporary musicians. The award assisted in the production of the band's debut, self-titled album, which was released in August 2010.

In September 2010 at the Deadly Awards 2010 Busby Marou won the award for "Most Promising New Talent".

Late in 2010, Busby Marou featured on the He Will Have His Way – Finn Brothers Tribute Album. The album went Gold within a month of release. Their contribution was a cover of "Better Be Home Soon". On 12 February 2011, Busby Marou performed at the Rugby League All Stars match at the Gold Coast.

In 2011, Busby Marou were signed to Warner Music Australia's indie imprint, Footstomp Records, and in June 2011, re-released their debut, self-titled album.

In October 2013, Busby Marou released their second studio album, Farewell Fitzroy which debuted at number 5 on the ARIA charts. In May and June 2014, the duo supported James Blunt for the Australian leg of his Moon Landing World Tour. In October 2014, "Days of Gold" became their first charting single, debuting at 82.

In February 2017, Busby Marou released their third studio album, Postcards from the Shell House, which debuted at number 1 on the ARIA Albums Chart.

2019, saw Busby Marou release album The Great Divide. The album featured ambient sounds and traditional music recorded by the duo when they visited Mer Island in the Torres Strait Island region. While there they listed to stories from the community regarding the impacts of climate change on the area and how it's affecting Torres Strait Islanders.

In October 2020, the band performed at the 2020 AFL Grand Final.

In March 2023, Busby Marou announced the forthcoming release of Blood Red. The album was their fifth studio album, and was released in July 2023.

In February 2026, Tom released the solo album Rockhampton Hangover.

== Influences and views ==
Their musical influences include elements of Crowded House, Elvis Presley, Pearl Jam and Willie Nelson. Busby has said that Paul Kelly and John Farnham provided him with inspiration, while Marou says that his love for music stems from his Torres Strait Islander culture, in which "everyone's self-taught and there's three, four, five-piece harmonies everywhere you go". The music of the islands has also played a big part in the development of Busby Marou's style.

The duo have never been overtly political, and do not talk about social issues in their concerts, but have spoken up in favour of the Indigenous Voice to Parliament in the run-up to the referendum on the Voice on 14 October 2023. They performed alongside Bernard Fanning at a Yes campaign rally in Brisbane.

== Discography ==
=== Albums ===
List of studio albums, with selected chart positions and certifications
Title	Album details	Peak chart positions	Certifications
Title	Album details	AUS	Certifications
Busby Marou	Released: August 2010; Label: Busby Marou / Footstomp Music (STOMPER001); Format: CD, digital download	24	ARIA: Gold
Farewell Fitzroy	Released: 4 October 2013; Label: Warner Music Australia (5310595582); Format: CD, digital download	5	
Postcards from the Shell House	Released: 17 February 2017; Label: Warner Music Australia (9760100786); Format: CD, digital download, LP	1	
The Great Divide	Released: 27 September 2019; Label: Warner Music Australia (5419705318); Format: CD, digital download, LP, streaming	5	
Blood Red	Released: 21 July 2023; Label: Sony Music Australia (19658803852); Format: CD, digital download, LP, streaming	14	

=== Extended plays ===
List of extended plays, with selected details
Title	EP details
The Blue Road	Released: 2007; Label: Busby Marou; Format: CD, digital download
What's Yours in Mine	Released: 2011; Label: Footstomp Music (STOMPER002); Format: CD, digital download

=== Singles ===
List of singles
Title	Year	Peak chart positions	Album
Title	Year	AUS	Album
"Underlying Message"	2009	—	The Blue Road
"Biding My Time"	2010	—	Busby Marou
"5 Rocks"	2011	—	Busby Marou
"Save Some for the Others"	2011	—	Busby Marou
"I Still Don't Believe"	2012	—	Busby Marou
"Get You Out of Here"	2013	—	Farewell Fitzroy
"Luck"	2014	—	Farewell Fitzroy
"My Second Mistake"	2014	—	Farewell Fitzroy
"Days of Gold"	2014	82	Farewell Fitzroy
"Getaway Car"	2016	—	Postcards from the Shell House
"Best Part of Me"	2017	—	Postcards from the Shell House
"Paint This Land"	2017	—	Postcards from the Shell House
"Days of Gold" (Borobi Version)	2017	—	Non-album single
"Got Your Back"	2018	—	Postcards from the Shell House
"Full Moon"	2018	—	Postcards from the Shell House
"Sound of Summer"	2018	—	Non-album single
"Over Drinking Over You"	2019	—	The Great Divide
"Naba Norem (The Reef Song)"	2019	—	The Great Divide
"Gone"	2020	—	The Great Divide
"Missing Person"	2020	—	True Colours, New Colours: The Songs of Split Enz
"Everything Is Beautiful"	2022	—	Blood Red
"Where I Wanna Be"	2023	—	Blood Red
"Crazy Like That"	2023	—	Blood Red
"Conversations"	2023	—	Blood Red
"Bloodstream"	2023	—	Blood Red
"People Get Old" (with Brad Butcher)	2023	—	East of Everything

== Awards and nominations ==
=== AIR Awards ===
The Australian Independent Record Awards (commonly known informally as AIR Awards) is an annual awards night to recognise, promote and celebrate the success of Australia's Independent Music sector.

Year	Nominee / work	Award	Result	Ref.
2011	themselves	Breakthrough Independent Artist	Nominated	
2011	Busby Marou	Best Independent Blues and Roots Album	Nominated	

=== APRA Awards ===
The APRA Awards are presented annually from 1982 by the Australasian Performing Right Association (APRA), "honouring composers and songwriters".

Year	Nominee / work	Award	Result	Ref.
2012	"Biding My Time" (Thomas Busby, Jeremy Marou)	Blues & Roots Work of the Year	Won	
2014	"Get You out of Here" (Thomas Busby, Jeremy Marou)	Blues & Roots Work of the Year	Nominated	
2014	"Luck" (Thomas Busby, Don Walker)	Blues & Roots Work of the Year	Nominated	
2018	"Best Part of Me" (Thomas Busby, Jeremy Marou, Jon Hume)	Blues & Roots Work of the Year	Won	
2018	"Getaway Car" (Thomas Busby, Jeremy Marou, David Ryan Harris)	Blues & Roots Work of the Year	Nominated	
2020	"Sound of Summer"	Most Performed Blues & Roots Work of the Year	Nominated	
2021	"Over Drinking Over You"	Most Performed Blues & Roots Work	Won	

=== ARIA Music Awards ===
The ARIA Music Awards is an annual awards ceremony that recognises excellence, innovation, and achievement across all genres of Australian music. Busby Marou have been nominated for three awards.

Year	Nominee / work	Award	Result	Ref.
2014	"My Second Mistake" (directed by Renny Wijeyamohan)	Best Video	Nominated	
2017	Postcards from the Shell House	Best Blues and Roots Album	Nominated	
2020	The Great Divide	Best Blues and Roots Album	Nominated	

=== Country Music Awards of Australia ===
The Country Music Awards of Australia is an annual awards night held in January during the Tamworth Country Music Festival. Celebrating recording excellence in the Australian country music industry. They commenced in 1973.

Year	Nominee / work	Award	Result	Ref.
2020	The Great Divide	Contemporary Country Album of the Year	Nominated	
2020	Busby Marou	Group or Duo of the Year	Nominated	
2024	Blood Red	Alt. Country Album of the Year	Pending	

=== Gold Coast Music Awards ===
The Gold Coast Music Awards are an annual awards ceremony that recognises musicians from the Gold Coast area.

Year	Nominee / work	Award	Result	Ref.
2020	"The Great Divide"	Release of the year	Won	

=== National Indigenous Music Awards ===
The National Indigenous Music Awards recognise excellence, innovation and leadership among Aboriginal and Torres Strait Islander musicians from throughout Australia. They commenced in 2004.

Year	Nominee / work	Award	Result	Ref.
2012	themselves	Artist of the Year	Nominated	
2012	Busby Marou	Album of the Year	Nominated	
2012		Song of the Year	Nominated	
2014	Farewell Fitzroy	Album of the Year	Nominated	
2014	"My Second Mistake"	Song of the Year	Nominated	
2014	"Get You Out of Here"	Song of the Year	Nominated	
2017	Postcards from the Shell House	Album of the Year	Nominated	
2018	"Days of Gold"	Song of the Year	Nominated	

=== Q Song Awards ===
The Queensland Music Awards (previously known as Q Song Awards) are annual awards celebrating Queensland, Australia's brightest emerging artists and established legends. They commenced in 2006.

Year	Nominee / work	Award	Result (wins only)	Ref.
2010	"Paint My Cup"	Indigenous Song of the Year	Won	
2020	"Naba Norem (The Reef Song)"	Blues and Roots Song of the Year	Won	
2024	"Conversation"	Blues and Roots Song of the Year	Won	
