= J.M. Clifford =

J.M. Clifford is an American singer-songwriter, guitarist and music educator based in Brooklyn, New York. His music incorporates elements of bluegrass, folk and Americana. He has released three albums and his songwriting has received recognition in several national competitions, including the Pensacola Beach Songwriters Festival, the Telluride Troubadour Songwriting Contest and the Common Ground on the Hill Acoustic Roots Songwriting Contest.

== Recording career ==
Clifford released his debut album, On a Saturday Night, on 1 October 2021. The ten-track album was developed from songs written during a period of personal loss and was recorded with musicians from Brooklyn's bluegrass community. It received coverage from The Bluegrass Situation and reviews from Bluegrass Today and Holler.

His second album, Trains, Thinkin' and Drinkin', was released in June 2024 through Brooklyn Basement Records. Produced by Ron Pope, the album features musicians including fiddle player Bronwyn Keith-Hynes, guitarist Seth Taylor, dobro player Jeff Partin and bassist Jeff Picker. Bluegrass Today reviewed the album in June 2024, describing Clifford's songwriting and musical approach favorably. His third album, Things That We Can't Change, was released on 16 October 2026. Also produced by Pope, the album features contributions from Wes Corbett, Shaun Richardson, Christian Sedelmyer, Jeff Picker and Justin Moses. Guitarist and singer Chris Eldridge appears on the track "Old Dirt Road".

== Songwriting awards ==
Clifford received second place in the Podunk Songwriting Competition and was a finalist in the 2024 American Songwriter Contest. In 2025, his song "Complicated Man", co-written with Ron Pope, won the grand prize in the Pensacola Beach Songwriters Festival national songwriting competition. He also won the grand prize at the Solarfest songwriting competition and placed third in the Telluride Troubadour Songwriting Contest.

In 2026, his song "Hard Luck Man" won first place in the Acoustic Roots Songwriting Contest organized by Common Ground on the Hill. He was also selected as a finalist in the 2026 Telluride Troubadour Songwriting Contest with "When You Dream". His song "Complicated Man" was included in Ear to the Ground Music’s Top 20 Songs of 2023 list.
