= Camille Parker =

American country singer

Camille Parker is a country singer from Durham, North Carolina.

== Early life and education ==
Parker was raised by her Jamaican grandmother and African American step-grandfather in Durham, North Carolina. She developed a love of music from her grandfather, a trumpet player, who introduced her to the music of The Temptations, Charley Pride, The Pointer Sisters, and Linda Martell. Parker's grandfather regularly brought her to the Hayti Heritage Center and annual jazz festivals.

Parker graduated from a performing arts high school in New York City. While an undergraduate student at George Mason University, Parker professionally recorded demo tracks for R&B songwriters. Parker didn't believe she could pursue a career in country until she heard Rissi Palmer's song, "Country Girl", which inspired her to be a country singer.

== Career ==
Parker was a member of Rissi Palmer's "Color Me Country" Class of 2021 and CMT's 2022 Next Women of Country class. In 2022, Parker performed at the CMA Music Festival. In 2023, she was selected to be a part of CMT's Equal Access Development Program.

Her debut single, "The Flame" ranked in the Top 10 of Apple Music’s country charts in over 17 countries.

In 2023, she was a contestant on My Kind of Country on Apple TV+. Parker performed the solo, “Space Cowboy” by Kacey Musgraves, and a duet of “Youngblood” by 5 Seconds of Summer with the group, Congo Cowboys.

== Influences ==
Parker has cited Dolly Parton, Chris Stapleton, Kacey Musgraves, The Chicks, Rihanna, D'Angelo, and Linda Ronstadt as her primary influences.

== Personal life ==
Parker resides in Northern Virginia with her husband.

== Discography ==
EPs
Title	Year	Source
"After The Whiskey, Pt. 1"	2023	

Singles
Title	Year	Source
"Heartless"	2023	
"Peace"	2023	
"Space Cowboy"	2023	
"The Flame"	2021	
