= My Kind of Country (American TV series) =

American television series

- Genre: Interactive reality game show
- Created by: Reese Witherspoon; Kacey Musgraves
- Directed by: Sam Wrench
- Judges: Mickey Guyton; Jimmie Allen; Orville Peck
- Country of origin: United States
- Original language: English
- No. of seasons: 1
- No. of episodes: 8

Production
- Executive producers: Reese Witherspoon; Sara Rea; Lauren Neustadter; Kacey Musgraves; Jason Owen; Izzie Pick Ibarra
- Production locations: Nashville, Tennessee
- Production company: Hello Sunshine

Original release
- Network: Apple TV+
- Release: March 24 – April 7, 2023

My Kind of Country is an American country music competition television series that features international competitors. It is created by Reese Witherspoon and Kacey Musgraves. My Kind of Country premiered on Apple TV+ on March 24, 2023.

The show is judged by country musicians Mickey Guyton, Jimmie Allen, and Orville Peck. The judges each choose four country artists from around the world to join their team, guide their teams of selected artists through various showcases and workshops, and make decisions as to which musicians advance to the next round, and which are eliminated.

Micaela Kleinsmith from Cape Town, South Africa, is the first winner of My Kind of Country. As her prize, Kleinsmith received $100,000 and extensive advertisement from Apple Music.

== Contestants ==
Name	Coach	Hometown	Result	Source
Micaela Kleinsmith	Orville Peck	Cape Town, South Africa	Winner	
Chuck Adams	Mickey Guyton	Nashville, Tennessee	Finalist	
Dhruv Visvanath	Jimmie Allen	New Delhi, India	Finalist	
Ale Aguirre	Jimmie Allen	Chihuahua, Mexico	Finalist	
Wandile	Mickey Guyton	Johannesburg, South Africa	Eliminated episode 6	
The Betsies	Mickey Guyton	Cape Town, South Africa	Eliminated episode 5	
Congo Cowboys	Orville Peck	Cape Town, South Africa	Eliminated episode 5	
Justin Serrao	Jimmie Allen	Johannesburg, South Africa	Eliminated episode 4	
Camille Parker	Jimmie Allen	Durham, North Carolina	Eliminated episode 4	
Alisha Pais	Orville Peck	Goa, India	Eliminated episode 4	
Ismay Hellman	Orville Peck	Petaluma, California	Eliminated episode 3	
Ashlie Amber	Mickey Guyton	Nashville, Tennessee	Eliminated episode 2	

== Contestant Progress ==
Contestant	1	2	3	4	5	6	7/8
Micaela Kleinsmith			Advanced	Advanced	Advanced	Advanced	Winner
Ale Aguirre	Advanced			Advanced	Advanced	Advanced	Runner-Up
Chuck Adams		Advanced		Advanced	Advanced	Advanced	Runner-Up
Dhruv Visvanath	Advanced			Advanced	Advanced	Advanced	Runner-Up
Wandile		Advanced		Advanced	Advanced	Eliminated	
The Betsies		Advanced		Advanced	Eliminated		
Congo Cowboys			Advanced	Advanced	Eliminated		
Justin Serrao	Advanced			Eliminated			
Camille Parker	Advanced			Eliminated			
Alisha Pais			Advanced	Eliminated			
Ismay Hellman			Eliminated				
Ashlie Amber		Eliminated					

Color key:

Winner
Runner-up
Advanced
Eliminated

== Performances ==
=== Jimmie Allen's Showcase ===
Contestant	Song	Result
Dhruv Visvanath	"Ring of Fire" by Johnny Cash	Advanced
Camille Parker	"Space Cowboy" by Kacey Musgraves	Advanced
Ale Aguirre	"Home" by Phillip Phillips	Advanced
Justin Serrao	"Wild World" by Cat Stevens	Advanced

=== Mickey Guyton's Showcase ===
Contestant	Song	Result
Wandile	"Just the Two of Us" by Bill Withers	Advanced
The Betsies	"Keep Your Heart Young" by Brandi Carlile	Advanced
Ashlie Amber	"Crazy For You" by Madonna	Eliminated
Chuck Adams	"Golden" by Harry Styles	Advanced

=== Orville Peck's Showcase ===
Contestant	Song	Result
Micaela Kleinsmith	"Need You Now" by Lady A	Advanced
Ismay Hellman	"Linger" by The Cranberries	Eliminated
Alisha Pais	"Glitter in the Air" by Pink	Advanced
Congo Cowboys	"Jolene" by Dolly Parton	Advanced

=== Jimmie Allen's Collaboration Workshop ===
Contestant	Song	Result
Camille Parker	"Youngblood" by 5 Seconds of Summer	Eliminated
Congo Cowboys	"Youngblood" by 5 Seconds of Summer	Advanced
Ale Aguirre	"Neon Moon" by Brooks & Dunn	Advanced
Dhruv Visvanath	"Neon Moon" by Brooks & Dunn	Advanced
Justin Serrao	"Somebody That I Used to Know" by Gotye	Eliminated
Micaela Kleinsmith	"Somebody That I Used to Know" by Gotye	Advanced
The Betsies	"The Weight" by The Band	Advanced
Chuck Adams	"The Weight" by The Band	Advanced
Alisha Pais	"Circles" by Post Malone	Eliminated
Wandile	"Circles" by Post Malone	Advanced

=== Mickey Guyton's Performance Workshop ===
Contestant	Song	Result
Micaela Kleinsmith	"Good Kisser" by Lake Street Dive	Advanced
Dhruv Visvananth	"Write" by Dhruv Visvanath	Advanced
Chuck Adams	"Colder Weather" by Zac Brown Band	Advanced
Congo Cowboys	"Ophelia" by The Lumineers	Eliminated
The Betsies	"Drinking Your Kind" by The Betsies	Eliminated
Ale Aguirre	"Stitches" by Shawn Mendes	Advanced
Wandile	"Our Lives Matter" by Wandile	Advanced

=== Orville Peck's Visual Storytelling Workshop ===
Contestant	Song	Result
Chuck Adams	"Take Me As I Am" by Chuck Adams	Advanced
Wandile	"So High" by John Legend	Eliminated
Ale Aguirre	"Distancia" by Ale Aguirre	Advanced
Micaela Kleinsmith	"Butterfly" by Micaela Kleinsmith	Advanced
Dhruv Visvanath	"Bad Guy" by Billie Eilish	Advanced

=== Finale ===
- Group Performance: "Gone Country" by Alan Jackson

Contestant	Song	Result
Dhruv Visvanath	"Style" by Taylor Swift	Runner-Up
Dhruv Visvanath	"Dear Madeline" by Dhruv Visvanath	Runner-Up
Ale Aguirre	"Hacia Ningún Lugar" by Ale Aguirre	Runner-Up
Ale Aguirre	"The Only Exception" by Paramore	Runner-Up
Micaela Kleinsmith	"If I Die Young" by The Band Perry	Winner
Micaela Kleinsmith	"Stupid Love" by Micaela Kleinsmith	Winner
Chuck Adams	"A.P.C.H." by Chuck Adams	Runner-Up
Chuck Adams	"Hold Back the River" by James Bay	Runner-Up

== Episodes ==
No.	Title	Original release date	Prod. code
1	"Jimmie Allen's Showcase"	March 24, 2023	101
2	"Mickey Guyton's Showcase"	March 24, 2023	102
3	"Orville Peck's Showcase"	March 24, 2023	103
4	"Jimmie Allen's Collaboration Workshop"	March 31, 2023	104
5	"Mickey Guyton's Performance Workshop"	March 31, 2023	105
6	"Orville Peck's Visual Storytelling Workshop"	March 31, 2023	106
7	"Finale Part I"	April 7, 2023	107
8	"Finale Part II"	April 7, 2023	108
