= Lucie Tiger =

Australian country music singer

Lucie Tiger (born 19 February) is an Australian country music singer, songwriter, and musician. In 2021, she won Country Blues Song of the Year for "Gasoline" at the Tamworth Songwriters Association Awards, Tamworth Country Music Festival, Australia. In 2025, she won Country Vocalist of the Year at the 11th Annual Josie Music Awards held at the Grand Ole Opry, Nashville.

Born in Sydney, Australia, Lucienne Tiger O'Connor now works in the United States as a professional songwriter, musician, and recording artist. Her songwriting encompasses country music, blues rock, Americana (music), and Bluegrass music.

== Early life and education ==
Lucie studied piano from age 6 with Janet Greenwood at Five Ways Music Studio, Sydney, where she performed regularly, including a performance at the Sydney Opera House, and completed AMEB (Australian Music Examinations Board) Grade 6 for piano. Lucie took up the guitar when she was 10, and formed her first band at age 14.

A creative writer from an early age, Lucie wrote short stories and songs throughout her childhood. She developed an approach to songwriting that is more observational than autobiographical, with storytelling at its core. Lucie's influences stretch beyond country music and she cites Chris Stapleton, Tyler Childers, and Miranda Lambert while also drawing inspiration from The Rolling Stones, blues music and the musical history of the South.

Lucie completed a degree in music at JMC Academy and post-graduate studies in history and literature at the University of Sydney. At JMC Academy, she was the main songwriter and rhythm guitarist in The Still Bandits, which won 3rd place in the Emergenza global band competition. While at university, Lucie was featured on the Channel TVS television program 'Songwriters Across Australia'. In 2019, Lucie Tiger featured in the Americana Showcase at Australian Music Week.

== Career ==
Recorded at Delta King Studios in Sydney and released in September 2019, Tiger's single "Apple Tree" garnered critical acclaim and was featured as the theme music for Good Morning Country, a radio program that is syndicated to 60+ radio stations around Australia.

Lucie Tiger's EP featuring the Award-winning single "Gasoline" was recorded at FAME Studios in Muscle Shoals in October 2019. "Gasoline" won Country Blues Song of the Year at the Tamworth Songwriters Association Awards, Tamworth Country Music Festival. The EP's lead single "Greenwood" prompted a front page newspaper feature article in Greenwood, Mississippi.

In October 2022, Lucie Tiger did a remote recording session in Muscle Shoals while still in Sydney due to Covid travel restrictions. She recorded ten tracks and released the album Alabama Highway in April 2022. Alabama Highway reached #14 on the ARIA Country Albums Chart in Australia, #25 on the ARIA Digital Albums Chart and #10 on the AIR Australian Independent Record Labels Chart.

Lucie Tiger released The Memphis Tapes album in September 2022. Recorded at Sun Studio in Memphis, The Memphis Tapes reached #7 on the AIR Australian Independent Record Labels Chart.

Before relocating to work in the United States in late 2023, Lucie Tiger charted five self-penned singles on the MusicRow Country Breakout Chart: "Found My Home" (#50), "Midnight Goodbye" (#68), "Right Next To You" (#78), "Burn It Down" (#78) and "Home Is Where The Heart Is" (#68).

In September 2023, Lucie left Sydney to work in Muscle Shoals, recording and songwriting. By May 2026, Lucie Tiger had charted additional singles on the MusicRow Country Breakout Chart: "Hummingbird" (#63), "Everybody Knows Your Name" (#53), "Harvest Moon" (#64), and "Cowboy Love Me" (#59), all of which were self-penned except "Cowboy Love Me" (Written by Lucie Tiger, Mark Narmore, Stephanie C. Brown, Maddye Trew) and "Harvest Moon" (Written by Lucie Tiger, Mark Narmore, Stephanie C. Brown). This record of chart recognition on Music Row prompted Lucie Tiger to move to Nashville.

=== Studio albums ===
| Title | Album details and label | Peak chart positions | |
| Title | Album details and label | AUS Indie | AUS Cou. |
|---|---|---|---|
| Alabama Highway | Release date - 15 April 2022; Label - 2120 Music | 10 | 14 |
| The Memphis Tapes | Release date - 23 September 2022; Label - 2120 Music | 7 | — |
| Greetings From Muscle Shoals | Release date - 27 September 2024; Label - 2120 Music | — | — |

=== Awards and nominations ===
| Year | Nominee / work | Award | Organization | Result | Ref. |
|---|---|---|---|---|---|
| 2021 | Lucie Tiger, "Gasoline" | Country Blues Song of the Year | Tamworth Songwriting Awards, Tamworth Country Music Festival | Won | |
| 2025 | Lucie Tiger | Country Vocalist of the Year | Josie Music Awards | Won | |
| 2025 | Lucie Tiger | Artist of the Year (Modern Country) | Josie Music Awards | Nominated | |
| 2026 | Lucie Tiger, "Harvest Moon" | Grand Prize - Songwriting | Pensacola Beach Songwriting Festival | Won | |
| 2026 | Lucie Tiger | Americana/Roots | Hollywood Independent Music Awards | Nominated | |
| 2026 | Lucie Tiger | Country Classic | Hollywood Independent Music Awards | Nominated | |
| 2026 | Lucie Tiger, "Hummingbird" | Country Music (North America) | InterContinental Music Awards | Won | |
| 2026 | Lucie Tiger | Exceptional Vocal Performance | Josie Music Awards | Nominated | |
| 2026 | Lucie Tiger | Songwriters Personal Portfolio | Josie Music Awards | Nominated | |
| 2026 | Lucie Tiger | Music Video of the Year | Josie Music Awards | Nominated | |
