= Sophia Brous =

Australian singer

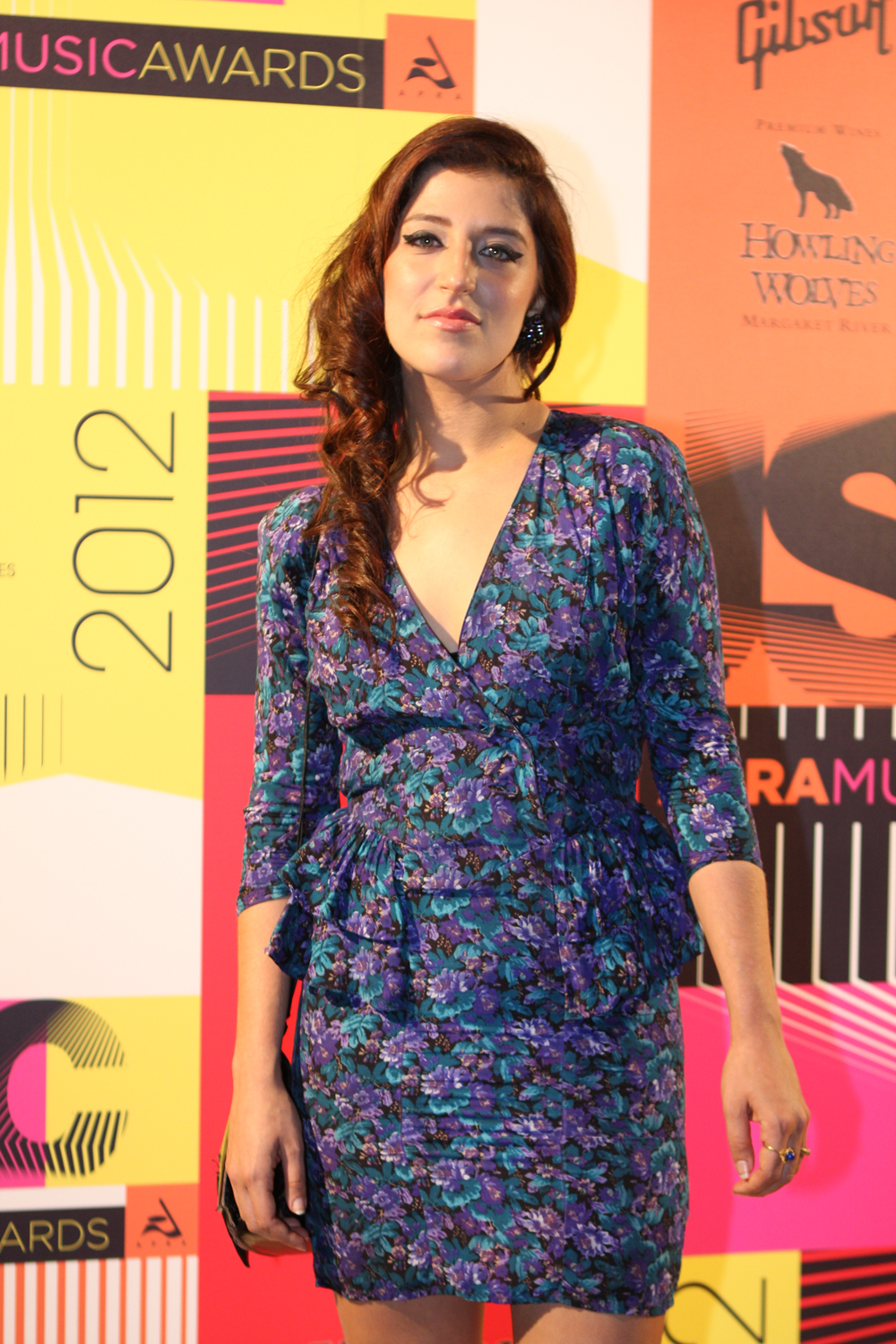
Sophia Brous at 2012 APRA Music Awards

Sophia Brous (born 1985) is an artist, performance-maker, musician and curator based in New York and Melbourne, Australia.

Brous was program director of the Melbourne International Jazz Festival from 2009-2011. She has also worked as a presenter on Triple R radio, and as music curator at the Adelaide Festival of Arts.

In 2011, Brous released her debut EP, Brous. According to Craig Mathieson writing for the Sydney Morning Herald, the tracks range from "gilded 1950 exotica and space-age textures to folk mysticism and spooked electronica".

In 2015, she created Supersense: Festival of the Ecstatic in collaboration with the Art Centre Melbourne.

In 2016, Brous went to New York and was appointed artist-in-residence at National Sawdust. She created "Lullaby Movement", a song cycle with lullabies from 25 different cultures. The same year, she and New Zealand pop singer Kimbra launched the band EXO-TECH, a large ensemble of New York musicians.

In 2018 she created Dream Machine with musician Dave Harrington, a large-scale concert installation for Pioneer Works New York / Red Bull Music Festival, featuring Iggy Pop, Master Musicians of Jajouka, Genesis Breyer P-Orridge, Zeena Parkins, Greg Fox.

In 2020 she was made a resident artist at Brooklyn Academy of Music, New York. In 2021 she was a resident artist at Providenza in Corsica, France.

In 2022, she co-directed The Invisible Opera in collaboration with Lara Thoms, Samara Hersch and Faye Driscoll for RISING festival in Melbourne. Her next project is an adaptation for the stage of the landmark novella Le Mont Analogue (1952) by French writer Réné Daumal that will be premiered at Ultima festival in Oslo in September 2022. This year she became the artistic director of Sophia Club, a program of cultural events in New York, London and Melbourne.

Brous attended King David School, Wesley College and the Victorian College of Arts. She moved to Boston to study at the New England Conservatory and the Berklee College of Music.
