= The Great Divide (Busby Marou album) =

Studio album by Busby Marou
- Released: 27 September 2019
- Length: 41:00
- Label: Warner Music Australia

Busby Marou chronology
Postcards from the Shell House (2017)	The Great Divide (2019)	Blood Red (2023)

Singles from The Great Divide
- 1. "Over Drinking Over You" Released: 12 July 2019; 2. "Naba Norem (The Reef Song)" Released: 20 September 2019; 3. "Gone" Released: 1 May 2020

The Great Divide is the fourth studio album by Australian blues and roots band Busby Marou. It was released on 27 September 2019.

The album draws from many aspects of the duo's personal and professional lives. The band told the National Indigenous Times "We aren't writing about one night stands or little love stories anymore, we're writing about happy families, and dealing with real life. It's really just getting all these conversations started." adding "We have a song called 'The Great Divide' and it's about mental illness and a few of our mates who have struggled. Some of our mates have taken their own lives and we hope this is a way to start talking about it."

== Track listing ==
No.	Title	Length
1.	"Breathing Space"	3:41
2.	"Lucky Stars"	2:46
3.	"Over Drinking Over You"	3:00
4.	"Paper Hearts"	3:09
5.	"Gone"	3:58
6.	"Wildflower"	3:25
7.	"Naba Norem (The Reef Song)"	4:15
8.	"Someday Comes Along"	3:26
9.	"Never Gets Old"	3:14
10.	"Best of Times"	3:11
11.	"One Day At a Time"	2:58
12.	"The Great Divide"	3:57
Total length:		41:00

== Charts ==
Chart (2019)	Peak position
Australian Albums (ARIA)	5

== Release history ==
Region	Date	Format	Label	Catalogue
Australia	27 September 2019	CD; digital download; streaming	Warner Music Australia	5419705318
Australia	27 September 2019	LP	Warner Music Australia	5419705319
