= Postcards from the Shell House =

Studio album by Busby Marou
- Released: 17 February 2017
- Length: 36:21
- Label: Warner Music Australia
- Producer: Jon Hume

Busby Marou chronology
Farewell Fitzroy (2013)	Postcards from the Shell House (2017)	The Great Divide (2019)

Singles from Postcards from the Shell House
- 1. "Getaway Car" Released: October 2016; 2. "Best Part of Me" Released: March 2017; 3. "Paint This Land" Released: April 2017; 4. "Got Your Back" Released: February 2018; 5. "Full Moon" Released: November 2018

Postcards from the Shell House is the third studio album by Australian blues and roots band Busby Marou. The album was released on 17 February 2017 and debuted at number 1 on the ARIA albums chart becoming the band's first number-one album.

Just prior to the album's release Busby Marou said "With this album for us, it's kind of make or break; we've spent so much time and money [on it], we've thrown everything into this one. We needed it to be successful; as much as we love it, it's also our livelihood."

== Reception ==
Hamish Geale from The Examiner called the album "some of their best work to date, on what is a consistent if not systematic collection of songs." adding "The pair have cemented their own sound; showcasing elegant vocal harmonies atop upbeat acoustic guitar work."

== Track listing ==
No.	Title	Writer(s)	Producer(s)	Length
1.	"Best Part of Me"	Thomas Busby; Jeremy Marou; Jon Hume	Jon Hume	3:05
2.	"Got Your Back"	Busby; Marou; Hume	Hume	3:00
3.	"Getaway Car"	Busby; Marou; David Ryan Harris	Hume	3:05
4.	"Drink the World Dry"	Busby; Alex Hope	Hume	3:00
5.	"Paint This Land"	Busby; Lindsay Rimes; Phil Barton	Hume	4:34
6.	"Full Moon"	Busby; Marou; Hope	Hume	3:01
7.	"Every Day in Between"	Busby; Marou; Kav Temperley; Michael Fatkin; Christopher Panousakis	Hume	3:11
8.	"Living in a Town"	Busby	Hume	3:14
9.	"Those Were the Days"	Busby; Marou; Hume	Hume	4:18
10.	"Sleep On It" (featuring Nat Dunn)	Busby; Natalie Dunn; Keelan Kenneth	Hume	3:40
11.	"The Story"	Busby; Steve Ruchleman	Hume	3:17

== Charts ==
=== Weekly charts ===
Chart (2017)	Peak position
Australian Albums (ARIA)	1

=== Year-end charts ===
Chart (2017)	Position
Australian Artist Albums (ARIA)	41

== Release history ==
Region	Date	Format	Label	Catalogue
Australia	17 February 2017	CD; digital download; streaming	Warner Music Australia	9760100786
Australia	21 April 2017	LP	Warner Music Australia	9760100792

== See also ==
- List of number-one albums of 2017 (Australia)
