= Ashlie Amber =

American musical artist

- Born: Ashlie-Amber Harris; Thornton, Colorado, US
- Occupations: Singer; songwriter; actress; author
- Years active: 2009–present
- Musical career
- Genres: Country; R&B; musical theater
- Instruments: Vocals
- Label: Independent
- Website: ashlieamber.com

Ashlie-Amber Harris is an American singer, songwriter, actress, and author. She was a contestant on My Kind of Country and her music has been featured on CMT and in Billboard. She has been nominated for three Henry Awards for best "lead" and "best supporting actress" in musical theater performances in Colorado. Her headline show, "I Will Always Love You" (a tribute to Whitney Houston), earned her a residency on the Celebrity Edge and she has performed the act in over 70 countries. In 2024, Amber released the EP "M.O."

== Early life ==
Ashlie-Amber Harris was born in Thornton, Colorado. She is one four children and has a twin brother. Coached by her father, she was active in volleyball, basketball, softball, and soccer, until he died from a heart attack when she was 11 years old. After his passing, Amber didn't pursue playing sports as she said that it reminded her too much of him and she began pursuing singing as an outlet for her grief.

She was signed to an independent record deal at 19 years old but felt it wasn't a good fit due to differences in the direction of music she wanted to go in. She wrote song hooks for local rappers and sang on their recordings as well as performing live with them occasionally.

== Career ==
Amber is a singer, songwriter, and author based in Nashville, Tennessee. As a singer she won multiple awards for her roles in musical theater, was a headline residency act on the Celebrity Edge with her Whitney Houston tribute show, "I Will Always Love You," and was a contestant on American Idol and My Kind of Country (coached by Mickey Guyton). As a singer/songwriter, her original songs have been featured on CMT and in Billboard, and as an author she wrote, "How Getting Cut From American Idol Changed My Life." Amber cites her musical influences as Shania Twain, Whitney Houston, and Mariah Carey.

In 2006, Amber began pursuing singing and acting in musical theater with her first role being in the musical, "Oscar & Felix" which ran through 2009. In 2010, she was cast in Rent, playing a lead role as Joanne Jefferson. In 2012, Amber was nominated for a Henry Award for "Outstanding Supporting Actress in a Musical" in The Who's Tommy. In 2013, she was cast in The Color Purple playing "Shug Avery," which received positive reviews and earned her a Henry Award nomination for "Outstanding Supporting Actress in a Musical." During the ceremony Amber was joined by fellow cast member SuCh onstage for a performance of the song, "What About Love" which received a standing ovation from the sold-out crowd. In 2013, she received a nomination for a Henry Award for her role in, Hair, as well as winning a True West Award for her role as Shug Avery in the Color Purple. In 2014, she moved to Washington, DC playing lead roles in "The Lady of the Lake" in "Spamalot" where she won a "Watch Award" and "Frank and Dorothy Fannon Award" for "Best Lead actress in a musical".

In 2011, Amber was a contestant on American Idol and in 2019 wrote, an EBook titled "How Getting Cut From American Idol Changed My Life," about her experiences on the show beginning as a senior in high school. In her book she wrote, "American Idol taught me to embrace the word no and accept the challenge."

In 2019, she had a residency on board the Celebrity Edge with her headline act, "I Will Always Love You," a Whitney Houston tribute show. She continued the show on different cruise lines and on one of her cruise performances, Don Ellis Gatlin, came up to Amber to talk about her music aspirations. She told Gatlin that she really wanted to do country music and he thought that was a great idea. In 2019, Gatlin become her manager and Ashlie released her first single, "Almost Love," which received favorable reviews.

In 2021, Amber released one of her first self-penned country singles, "Open," which was featured on CMT. She was also featured as one of "several black women in country music in Nashville" in Billboard magazine. Rissi Palmer spotlighted Amber in her handpicked "Color Me Country" Class of 2021, praising her and saying "there is absolutely no reason why Ashlie Amber shouldn’t be a huge star, period." Ashlie has been featured on Good Morning Nashville performing her Christmas song, "Wishlist" as well as performing with the Song Suffragettes periodically.

In March 2024, she released her single, "Keep You Around," which was featured in Billboard magazine, followed by the release of her debut EP, "M.O." Also in 2024, Amber was a featured artist on CMA's day party for inclusion.

=== Musical Theater ===
- 2009 - Oscar & Felix (The Odd Couple)
- 2010 - Rent - Joanne Jefferson
- 2010 - In Search of Eckstine: A Love Story - Misty
- 2010 - A Christmas Carol - Ghost of Christmas Past
- 2010 - Schoolhouse Rock Live! - Whynona
- 2011 - Hairspray - Judine/Dynamite
- 2011 - Pippin - the leading player
- 2012 - The Who's Tommy - The Gypsy Ensemble
- 2013 - The Color Purple - Shug Avery
- 2013 - Hair - Dionne
- 2014 - Spamalot - the Lady of the Lake
- 2015 - The Music of Andrew Lloyd Weber - Vocalist
