= Own This Club =

2011 single by Marvin Priest

Single by Marvin Priest

from the album Beats & Blips
- Released: 25 February 2011
- Recorded: 2011
- Genre: Dance-pop, R&B
- Length: 3:21
- Label: Universal
- Songwriter(s): Anthony Egizii, Marvin Priest, David Musumeci
- Producer(s): DNA Songs

Marvin Priest singles chronology
"Rockstar" (2010)	"Own This Club" (2011)	"Take Me Away" (2011)

"Own This Club" is a song by British Australian-based singer Marvin Priest, released as the first single from his debut album, Beats & Blips on 25 February 2011. The song peaked at six on the Australian ARIA Singles Chart, being certified double platinum with sales exceeding 140,000 copies. "Own This Club" was written and produced by Australian songwriting team DNA Songs. The song was the seventh most added song to radio on the week commencing 7 March 2011.

== Chart performance ==
"Own This Club" debuted on the ARIA Singles Chart at number 43 on the issue dated 14 March 2011. After falling out of the top 50 two weeks later, it re-entered the chart at number 41 on 11 April 2011 and eventually reached the peak position of six on 23 May 2011, staying at that spot for three consecutive weeks and spending nine weeks in the top 10. The song also charted on the New Zealand Singles Chart, debuting at number 37 on the week dated 25 April 2011 and reached the top 10 five weeks later, peaking at seven. It has since been certified gold by Recording Industry Association of New Zealand (RIANZ), selling an excess of 7,500 copies.

== Music video ==
The music video for "Own This Club" premiered on Marvin Priest's VEVO YouTube channel on 22 February 2011. It was directed by Silo Collective in Sydney and shows scenes with Marvin walking through Kings Cross station and Green Square while the ACE dance group are dancing behind him. The ending of the video shows Marvin Priest and the dancers inside a club with several other people and cuts to scenes with Marvin in front of a pink background in between.

== Track listings ==
Digital download

1. "Own This Club" – 3:21

Digital EP

1. "Own This Club" – 3:21
2. "Own This Club" (Tom Piper Remix) – 5:50
3. "Own This Club" (PK Phoenix Extreme Element Remix) – 4:40

== Charts and certifications ==
=== Weekly charts ===
Chart (2011)	Peak position
Australia (ARIA)	6
New Zealand (Recorded Music NZ)	7

=== Year-end charts ===
Chart (2011)	Position
Australia (ARIA)	45

== Certifications ==
Region	Certification	Certified units/sales
Australia (ARIA)	2× Platinum	140,000^{^}
New Zealand (RMNZ)	Gold	7,500^{*}
^{*} Sales figures based on certification alone.^{^} Shipments figures based on certification alone.
