= Jetty Road (band) =

Australian country music trio

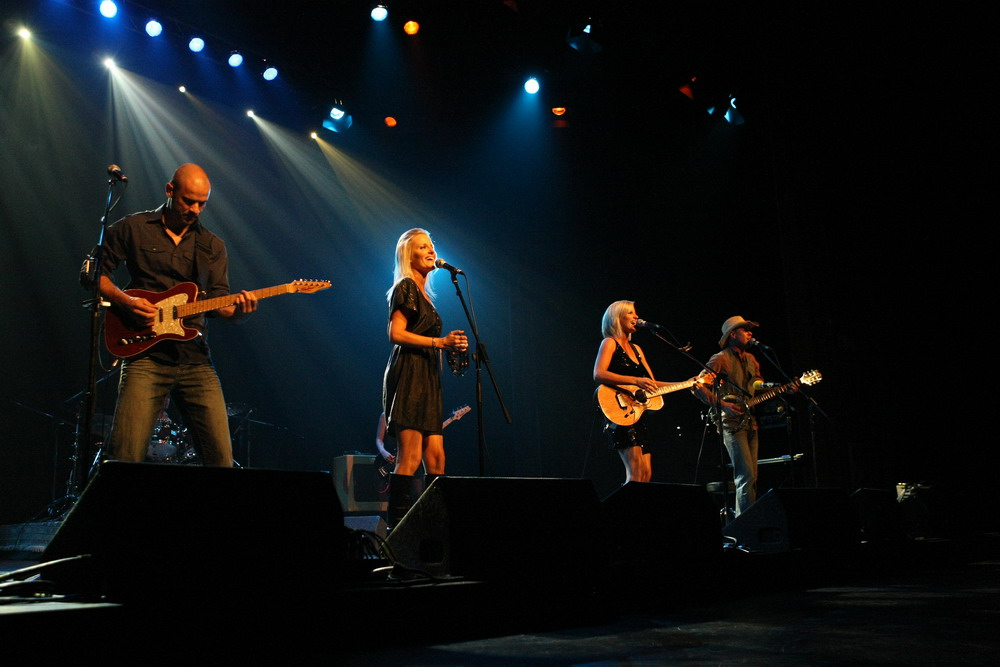
- L to R: Julian Sammut, Paula Bowman, Lee Bowman, Simon Ross; Tamworth Country Music Festival, January 2010

Background information
- Origin: Melbourne, Victoria, Australia
- Genres: Country
- Years active: 2005–present
- Labels: One Stop Entertainment; Compass Bros; WJO/Shock; Sony
- Members: Lee Bowman; Paula Bowman; Julian Sammut
- Past members: Alexander Ross; Ben Cant; Russell Cochrane
- Website: jettyroad.band

Jetty Road are an Australian country music trio comprising identical twin sisters Lee Bowman and Paula Bowman, both on vocals, with Julian Sammut on lead guitar. Founding multi-instrumentalist member, Simon Ross left in 2012. They have released five albums, Full Circle (2005), Dirt Roads City Lights (2007), Life at a Million Miles (2009), Far Away Places (2011) and Hearts on Fire (2015). The group have won two Country Music Awards of Australia Golden Guitar trophies. Hearts on Fire peaked in the top 40 on the ARIA Albums Chart.

== History ==
Jetty Road's founding members are identical twin sisters Lee Bowman, on vocals and acoustic guitar, and Paula Bowman (both born on 30 April 1976) on vocals, with Julian Sammut (born 7 June 1973) on lead guitar and Simon Ross (born 16 June 1976) on guitar, harmonica, mandolin and accordion. The four met during their tertiary educational studies at Box Hill Institute of Music (1995–97). Several years after graduating the quartet began writing and recording music. They were named after the Bowman's childhood home on Nungurner Jetty Road, Nungurner (see Shire of Tambo) and made their debut by busking at the Tamworth Country Music Festival in January 2005. They placed second in the Tamworth Busking Championships.

Jetty Road released their debut album Full Circle on One Stop Entertainment in January 2005. A single, "Run to You", was released in that year, which peaked at #21 on the national Country Tracks Top 30 Chart. The song was selected as the opening track on John Nutting's ABC Saturday Night Country Hottest Hits, Vol. 2. By 2006 the group had added Ben Cant on drums and Russell Cochrane on bass guitar.

At the beginning of 2007 Jetty Road met Australian country musician, James Blundell and spent the next 18 months touring together. Their second album, Dirt Roads City Lights was released in that year.

2008

Jetty Road received their first finalist nomination in the 36th Country Music Awards of Australia (Best Group or Duo). They won the TIARA Award for Best Group; the following month their Dirt Roads City Lights album won Victorian Album of the Year at the Victorian & National Country Music Awards. June 2008 saw the band undertake their first international tour, performing in Nashville, Canada and the UK.

2009

In January 2009 they won Best Group at the Australian Country Music People's Choice Awards. They also won their second consecutive TIARA Award. In March 2009 Jetty Road's third album Life at a Million Miles was released (Compass Bros), produced by band member Julian Sammut and co produced by Nashville-based Australian expat Mark Moffatt. The band undertook their second international tour (June – September) to Canada, the United States, France, Switzerland, Germany, Denmark, Austria and Norway. Upon returning to Australia, they won Group/Duo of the Year, Album of the Year and Artist of the Year at the Australian Independent Country Music Awards in October.

2010

In January 2010, at the 38th Country Music Awards of Australia, the band won their first CMAA (Golden Guitar) Award in the category, Best Group or Duo, for their track, "Million Miles". They scored an additional two finalist nominations that year, for Album of the Year (Life at a Million Miles) and Single of the Year ("Million Miles").

Jetty Road won Best Group and Best Song (Million Miles) awards at the Australian Country Music People's Choice Awards, as well as Best Group (National), Victorian Album of the Year and Victorian Entertainer of the Year at the Victorian & National Country Music Awards. A few months later they won the National Music Oz Award for Best Country Act.
Mid 2011 saw Jetty Road touring extensively throughout Canada and Europe and song writing with Canadian writers/artists including The Road Hammer's Jason McCoy (I'm A Dreamer/Welcome to the Party), The Higgins (Let It Out/Look At Me) and write and sing a duet with George Canyon (Wrong). In October Jetty Road recorded their fourth album Far Away Places in Vancouver at The Factory Studios with Canadian producer Paul Shatto and David Wills.

2011

Far Away Places was released on 6 May 2012 in Australia (WJO). It peaked at number 12 on the ARIA Top 20 Australian Artist Country Albums Chart and remained there for 30 weeks. The debut single release “Serves You Right” achieved #1 on the CMC Top 30 Chart and also radio's national Country Tracks Chart ( #1 for 4 weeks). The album was also signed to Canada's OnRamp Records (EMI). “Let It Out” was released to Canadian Country radio and charted at #49 on the Media Base airplay chart.
Midyear saw their fourth consecutive international tour to Canada and Europe. They returned in October to win the major Professional Development Award ($20,000 prize) at the inaugural Australian Independent Artist Development Awards (AIADA). They were finalists in all three categories (including People's Choice and Video of the Year Awards). A week later Jetty Road went on to win Group/Duo of the Year at the Australian Independent Country Music Awards.

2012

In January 2012 the band won their second CMAA (Golden Guitar) Award at the 40th Country Music Awards of Australia for Best Group or Duo. In February Jetty Road won Best Group (National), Best Independent Release (National), Best Group (VIC), Victorian Album of the Year (VIC) and Victorian Entertainer of the Year at the 2012 Victorian & National Country Music Awards. The same month saw their single I'm A Dreamer reach #1 on the CMC Top 30 Chart and also the national radio Country Tracks Chart (#1 for 7 weeks). In May, Jetty Road was recognized nationally when their song ‘Serves You Right’ was nominated for the APRA 'Country Work of the Year' Award alongside Kasey Chambers, Shane Nicholson and O’Shea. Their third single Sweet Goodbye was released from their Far Away Places album in September, achieving #1 on the CMC Top 30 Chart and the national radio Country Tracks Chart (#1 x 3 weeks).

In October 2012, Jetty Road won their third consecutive Group/Duo of the Year Award at the Australian Independent Country Music Awards. Ross left the group due to "family commitments", the band issued a statement "Simon has expressed the need to devote more time to his 4 yr old son Nico, who lives in Germany and will therefore pursue other projects. This has been a difficult decision for Simon, something he has not taken lightly."

== Discography ==
=== Albums ===
Title	Details	Peak positions AUS
Full Circle	Released: January 2005 (Australia); Label: One Stop Entertainment	—
Dirt Roads City Lights	Release date: 26 February 2007 (Australia); Label: One Stop Entertainment	—
Life at a Million Miles	Release date: 20 April 2009 (Australia); Label: Compass Bros Distribution	—
Far Away Places	Release date: 6 May 2011 (Australia), 28 June 2011 (Canada); Label: WJO Distribution (Australia), OnRamp (Canada)	—
Hearts on Fire	Release date: 29 May 2015 (Australia); Label: Sony	38
Because We Can	Release date: 20 September 2019; Label: Social Family	25

=== Music videos ===
Year	Video	Director
2005	Be With You	Gary Hedegus
2006	Run To You; Till The Day I Die	Steve Hadley
2007	Real Smooth Cowboy; I Wanna Go Home	Ross Wood
2008	City Lights; Good Times	Ross Wood
2009	Million Miles; World Keeps Turning	Ross Wood
2010	Road To Nowhere; I Have Been	Duncan Toombs
2011	Serves You Right; I'm A Dreamer	Mick Jones; Glenn Wilson
2012	Sweet Goodbye; Wrong	Robb Cox; Duncan Toombs
2015	What We Did Last Night; Hearts On Fire; I Turn To You	Josh Favaloro; Josh Favaloro; Peter John
2017	Shakedown; You Need To Run	Jesse Anderson

== Awards and nominations ==
=== Country Music Awards of Australia ===
The Country Music Awards of Australia (CMAA) (also known as the Golden Guitar Awards) is an annual awards night held in January during the Tamworth Country Music Festival, celebrating recording excellence in the Australian country music industry. They have been held annually since 1973.

Year	Award	Detail	Result
2008	Group or Duo of the Year	Real Smooth Cowboy	Nominated
2010	Group or Duo of the Year	Million Miles	Won
2012	Group or Duo of the Year	Serves You Right	Won
2020	Group or Duo of the Year	Because We Can	Nominated

=== APRA Awards ===
Year	Award	Work	Result
2012	Country Work of the Year	"Serves You Right"	Nominated
