= Busby Marou (album) =

- 2011 release

Studio album by Busby Marou
- Released: August 2010
- Label: Busby Marou, Footstomp Records

Busby Marou chronology
The Blue Road (2007)	Busby Marou (2010)	Farewell Fitzroy (2013)

Singles from Busby Marou
- 1. "Biding My Time" Released: 2010; 2. "5 Rocks" Released: June 2011; 3. "Save Some for the Others" Released: February 2012; 4. "I Still Don't Believe" Released: March 2012

Busby Marou is the debut studio album by Australian blues and roots band Busby Marou. The album was originally self-released in August 2010 and was re-released on Warner Music Australia's indie imprint, Footstomp Records in June 2011 with a deluxe edition being released in March 2012.

In December 2010, in an interview with Deadly Vibe Magazine, Thomas Busby said "Most of our songs were written about home, or memories or places that we love and it's all really laidback, folky pop sort of tunes. We asked our producer if we could go back home to Yeppoon to record it because it was a bit difficult living out of a motel room for a couple of weeks recording. So we went back home and it was the best move, it was so relaxed, we were there for a couple of weeks, we already had the songs nutted out so we were just laying tracks down, laying the vocals down, and Jeremy with the guitar and bass work – so great process and great fun, and we got to stay at home as well and catch up with family while we were there."

The album peaked at number 24 on the ARIA Charts and was certified gold in 2014. The album was supported by a national tour across June and July 2011.

== Background and release ==
In 2007, Thomas Busby and Jeremy Marou met and formed the band Busby Marou. The duo released their debut extended play later in 2007. In 2009, Busby Marou was one of five successful applicants for 'Breakthrough' – A Federal Government initiative supporting emerging indigenous contemporary musicians. The award assisted in the production of the band's debut album which was released in August 2010.

== Reception ==
Lauren from Sounds of Oz said "This is really is back to basics music, without frills or gimmicks... It uses elements we know but don't hear enough of these days; simple but beautiful harmonies, the driving force of an acoustic guitar, and honest lyrics that paint moving stories." concluding with "Busby Marou's self-titled album is quite simply one of the best recordings I've heard all year."

== Track listing ==
No.	Title	Writer(s)	Length
1.	"All of You"		2:52
2.	"Biding My Time"	Thomas Busby, Jeremy Marou	4:03
3.	"Banjo"		4:29
4.	"This Moment"		3:12
5.	"Painting My Cup (Early 60s)"		4:10
6.	"Dancing On the Moon"		3:30
7.	"Save Some for the Others"		3:31
8.	"Lhasa"		2:52
9.	"Not Fire Not Ice"		2:00
10.	"Underlying Message"		4:25
11.	"5 Rocks"		3:41
12.	"Konomie"		2:43

Busby Marou — Deluxe edition (bonus tracks)
No.	Title	Writer(s)	Length
13.	"I Still Don't Believe"		3:44
14.	"Girls Just Want to Have Fun"	Robert Hazard	3:33
15.	"If I could Talk I'd Tell You"	Evan Dando, Eugene Kelly	2:57
16.	"Something for Me"		2:51
17.	"Moving On"		3:21

== Charts ==
Chart (2011–12)	Peak position
Australian Albums (ARIA)	24

== Certifications ==
Region	Certification	Certified units/sales
Australia (ARIA)	Gold	35,000^{^}
^{^} Shipments figures based on certification alone.

== Release history ==
Region	Date	Format	Label	Catalogue	Edition
Australia	August 2010	CD; digital download	Busby Marou		Original release
Australia	24 June 2010	CD; digital download	Footstep Music	STOMPER001	Original re-release
Australia	30 March 2012	CD; digital download	Busby Marou	STOMPER003	Deluxe Edition
