= Biding My Time (Busby Marou song) =

Single by Busby Marou

from the album Busby Marou
- Released: 2010
- Length: 3:40
- Label: Busby Marou
- Songwriters: Thomas Busby, Jeremy Marou

Busby Marou singles chronology
"Underlying Message" (2009)	"Biding My Time" (2010)	"5 Rocks" (2011)

Music video
- "Biding My Time" on YouTube

"Biding My Time" is a song written and performed by Australian blues and roots band Busby Marou. The song was released to radio in 2010 and digitally in May 2011 as the lead single from the duo's self-titled debut studio album. The single was digitally re-released in September 2011 and included a cover of Cyndi Lauper's "Girls Just Want to Have Fun" after the duo performed both tracks live on Triple J's Like a Version in July 2011.

Tom Busby said "We used to call this song 'The Chase' which is ironic because it is basically about hanging around the same spot waiting and hoping for a good thing to come into play.. It was the last song written for the album and it was penned in the studio in record time. There was a girl in mind at the time but she hung around for about as long as it took to write. Regardless, it has that certain type of mood and direction we feel our music is heading. We're never in a rush when we're playing together and we feel this track is a fair indication of our style."

At the APRA Music Awards of 2012, the song won the award for "Blues & Roots Work of the Year".

== Music video ==
The music video was released on 12 April 2011.

== Reception ==
Lisa Rockman from The Newcastle Herald called the song "infectious and heartfelt". Country Music Channel Australia called the song "emotive".

== Track listing ==
- Digital download
1. "Biding My Time" – 3:40
- Digital download
1. "Biding My Time" – 3:40
2. "Girls Just Want to Have Fun" – 3:33

== Release history ==
Country	Date	Format	Label	Edition
Australia	2010	Contemporary hit radio	Busby Marou	
Australia	27 May 2011	Digital download	Busby Marou	Single track edition
Australia	29 September 2011	Digital download	Busby Marou	Double track edition
