= Good Morning Country =

Australian country music radio show

- Genre: Country music
- Running time: Weekdays: Four hours (5:00 am – 9:00 am)
- Country of origin: Australia
- Website: goodmorningcountry.com.au

Good Morning Country is a syndicated Australian country music radio show, broadcasting each weekday from 5 am to 9 am. It is presented by the Community Broadcasting Association of Australia and is hosted by Kevin Walsh (4 days a week), with Heather Farrell hosting on Thursdays.
