= Blood Red (album) =

Studio album by Busby Marou
- Released: 21 July 2023
- Length: 38:02
- Label: Sony Music Australia

Busby Marou chronology
The Great Divide (2019)	Blood Red (2023)

Singles from Blood Red
- 1. "Everything Is Beautiful" Released: 29 April 2022; 2. "Where I Wanna Be" Released: 17 February 2023; 3. "Crazy Like That" Released: 5 April 2023; 4. "Conversation" Released: 19 May 2023; 5. "Bloodstream" Released: 7 July 2023

Blood Red is the fifth studio album by Australian blues and roots duo Busby Marou, released on 21 July 2023.

The duo performed the album in its entirety at the Between the Tides on 7 and 8 July 2023. The album was supported by an Australian tour, commencing on 18 August 2023.

At the 2024 Country Music Awards of Australia, the album was nominated for Alt. Country Album of the Year.

== Track listing ==
Blood Red track listing
No.	Title	Length
1.	"Crazy Like That"	3:17
2.	"Bloodstream"	3:24
3.	"Where I Wanna Be"	3:09
4.	"Conversations"	3:15
5.	"Smile from a Stranger"	2:54
6.	"Crying"	3:52
7.	"Long Way Round"	3:07
8.	"Surrender"	3:16
9.	"Someone"	4:30
10.	"Low"	3:25
11.	"Everything Is Beautiful"	3:53
Total length:		38:02

== Charts ==
Chart performance for Blood Red
Chart (2023)	Peak position
Australian Albums (ARIA)	14
